= History of Ceará =

Historical background of the Brazilian state of Ceará

In focus, the state of Ceará.

The history of Ceará began with the Portuguese colonization, characterized by the resistance of the natives and the difficulties the European had in adapting to the climatic conditions of the territory. Initially, a rural society was formed, based mainly on livestock and agriculture, which controlled almost every aspect of social life through its economic power and complex relations of parentage and patronage. The so-called "coronéis" kept many dependents on their properties who provided them with services or gave them part of their production in exchange for owning a plot of land, in a semi-feudal regime. The servitude of Africans, although of lesser importance, was practiced throughout the 17th and 18th centuries, especially in areas where agriculture flourished.

The history of Ceará was characterized by political struggles and armed movements during the Empire and the First Republic, but normalized after the country's reconstitutionalization in 1945. The droughts and the state's troubled social and economic factors led to the emergence of important events in history, such as the cangaço, messianic movements and emigration to other states. Historically, Ceará has undergone major transformations since the 1950s, progressively becoming a predominantly urban, more industrialized state with growing regional and income inequality.

== Colonial period ==
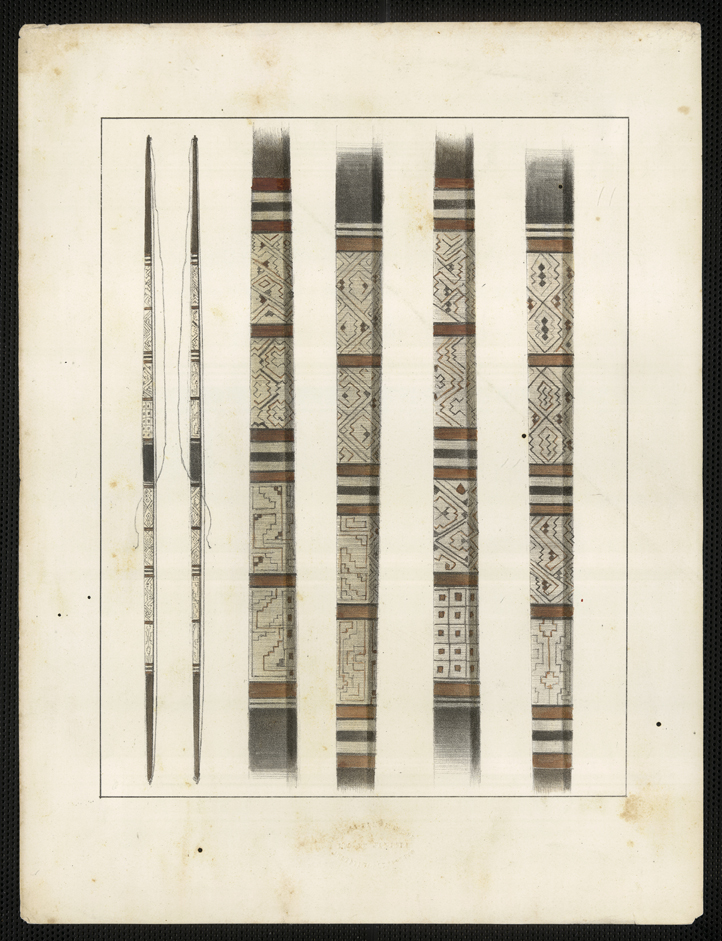
Examples of artifacts from indigenous peoples typical of Ceará in an engraving by the Scientific Exploration Commission.

In 1535, the lands that currently belong to Ceará were donated to Antônio Cardoso de Barros, but he was not interested in colonizing them and never even visited the captaincy. He died in 1556, alongside the first bishop of Brazil, Dom Pero Fernandes Sardinha, devoured by the Caeté people after a shipwreck off the coast of Alagoas. The first significant attempt at Portuguese colonization was made by Pero Coelho de Sousa, who led the first expedition in 1603, demonstrating Portugal's interest in colonizing Ceará. The bandeirantes' mission was to explore the Jaguaribe River, fight pirates, "make peace" with the indigenous people and try to find precious metals. Setting off from Paraíba, leading 200 indigenous people already submissive to him and 65 soldiers (including the young Martim Soares Moreno), Pero Coelho reached the Chapada da Ibiapaba along the coast, where he fought the Tabajara people and some Frenchmen, who were allies at the time.

After defeating his opponents, Pero Coelho tried to continue on to Maranhão, but only reached the Parnaíba River because his men, tired, ragged and hungry, refused to continue. Returning to the coast, he founded the Fort of São Tiago, on the banks of the Ceará River, and the settlement of Nova Lusitânia, but he didn't stay there long. The natives, resentful of the brutal behaviour of the "civilized" Europeans, began to attack the fort. Pero Coelho retreated to the Jaguaribe River and built the Fort of São Lourenço on its banks. However, the heavy drought of 1605 to 1609 (the first recorded by local historiography) and persistent indigenous attacks led him to leave the territory on a painful journey, in which some soldiers and his eldest son perished from hunger and thirst. Heading for the Fort of Reis Magos in Rio Grande do Norte and then Paraíba and Europe, Pero Coelho died in Lisbon, poor, after trying to collect payment from Portugal for services provided; the pioneering attempt to occupy "little Ceará" had failed.

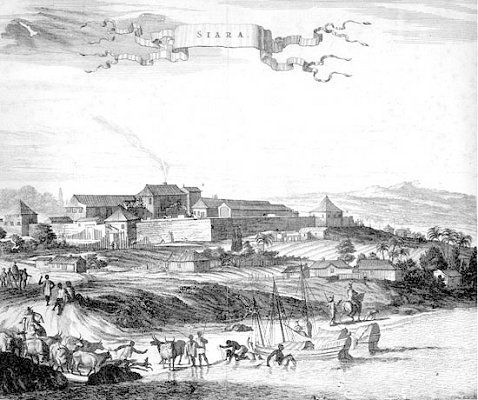
The Fort of São Sebastião by Martim Soares Moreno.

In 1607, after Pero Coelho's failure to conquer the indigenous communities, Jesuit priests Francisco Pinto and Luís Figueira were sent to evangelize the natives. They traveled as far as the Chapada da Ibiapaba, where they stayed until the death of Father Francisco in October of the same year. Father Luís Figueira returned to Rio Grande do Norte, and later reported on his venture in Relação do Maranhão, the first text written about Ceará. However, Figueira was not very successful in his dealings with the native Brazilians. Years later, in 1643, victim of a shipwreck on the island of Marajó, he was killed and devoured by the Aruá indigenous people. In 1611, under the command of Martim Soares Moreno (later considered the "founder" of Ceará), the Fort of São Sebastião was built on the banks of the Ceará River, in the area currently known as Barra do Ceará (on the border between the municipalities of Fortaleza and Caucaia).

Portuguese colonization of the region was hampered by strong opposition from indigenous tribes and invasions by French pirates. European settlement only developed with the construction of the Dutch fort Schoonenborch, at the mouth of the Pajeú Creek, which in 1654 was taken by the Portuguese and renamed the Fortress of Nossa Senhora de Assunção. The second settlement of Ceará, called Forte or Fortaleza, was formed around this fortress. After much political dispute between Aquiraz and Fortaleza, the latter officially became the capital of Ceará on April 13, 1726.

There were two fronts of Portuguese occupation of the territory of Ceará: the sertão-de- fora, controlled by people from Pernambuco who came from the coast; and the sertão-de-dentro, dominated by people from Bahia. Thanks to cattle ranching and the displacement of people from the more populated areas, almost the entire Ceará was occupied over time, leading to the creation of several important towns at the crossroads of the main roads used by the vaqueros, such as Icó. Throughout the 18th century, Ceará's main economic activity was livestock farming, which led many historians to say that the state became a "Leather Civilization", since practically all the objects necessary for the life of the sertanejo were made from leather through rich handicrafts.

The jerky trade was decisive for the economic life of Ceará throughout the 18th and 19th centuries, creating a division of labor between the regions of the state: on the coast there were the jerky factories and in the hinterland there were the areas for raising cattle. The product also allowed landowners and merchants to get rich, as well as the emergence of a very small local domestic market. The era ended after the droughts from 1790 and 1793, which devastated the state and made it impossible to continue ranching in Ceará. With this event, jerky production moved to Rio Grande do Sul.

Other settlements emerged from indigenous villages, where the natives were confined under the control of Jesuits, who were responsible for their catechization and acculturation. This was the situation in important cities such as Caucaia, Crato, Pacajus, Messejana and Parangaba (the last two are now districts of Fortaleza). The indigenous people of Ceará were, for the most part, massacred, although they have resisted to this day. One of the greatest examples of their resilience was the War of the Barbarians, in which natives from different tribes (Kiriri, Janduim, Baiacu, Icó, Anacé, Quixelô, Jaguaribara, Kanindé, Tremembé, Acriú) banded together to fight the Portuguese conquerors, bravely resisting for almost 50 years.

Ceará became administratively independent from Pernambuco in 1799. In the previous decades, cotton cultivation had begun to emerge as an important economic activity, resulting in a period of prosperity for the captaincy. With the recovery of cotton growing in the United States of America, cotton and Ceará itself went into crisis, which explains the involvement of locals in the Pernambucan revolt of 1817 and the Confederation of the Equator.

== Independence movements during the Empire ==
Map of the Captaincy of Ceará, drawn up by order of Governor Manuel Inácio de Sampaio.

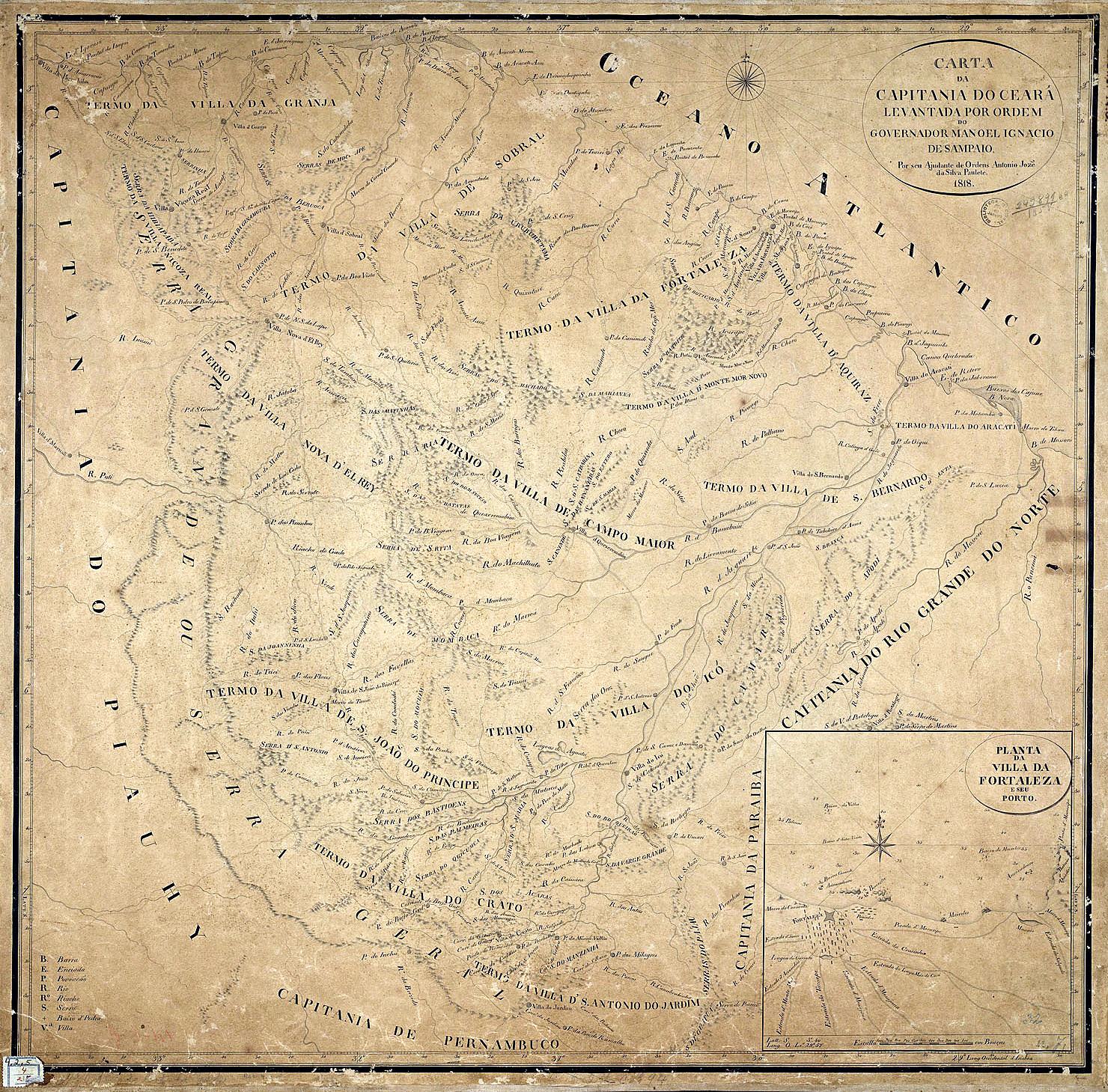
Letter from the Captaincy of Ceará, Antônio José da Silva Paulet, 1818.

The 19th century was also marked by some revolutionary movements and conflicts. In 1817, some people from Ceará, led by the Alencar family, supported the Pernambucan Revolt. However, the movement was restricted to Cariri and especially to the city of Crato, and was quickly suppressed. In 1824, after Brazil's independence, the same republican and liberal ideals appeared in the Confederation of the Equator, in a broader and more organized form. Joining the rebels from Pernambuco, several cities in Ceará, such as Crato, Icó and Quixeramobim, showed their dissatisfaction with the imperial government.

After clashes with the provisional government controlled by Emperor Pedro I, the Republic of Ceará was established on August 26, 1824, with Tristão Alencar as president of the Council that would govern the province. However, the strong repression of the imperial forces quickly defeated the rebel movement for several reasons: the military superiority of the troops, the low level of popular participation and the arrest or death of the main leaders.

Another event was the Pinto Madeira Sedition, a violent conflict between the town of Crato, led by republican liberals (most notably the Alencar family), and the town of Jardim, practically dominated by Pinto Madeira, who was absolutist and authoritarian. The two local elites fought for political control of Cariri in Ceará. In the end, the people of Crato hired the French mercenary Pierre Labatut and, with an army composed of poor sertanejos, surrendered the people of Jardim. Pinto Madeira was sentenced in Crato after being found guilty of the death of the liberal José Pinto Cidade.

The state also experienced a real economic boom in the 19th century during the American Civil War in the United States, which, by affecting North American cotton farming, opened up the world market for cotton from Ceará. During this period, Fortaleza overtook Aracati as Ceará's main city; cotton replaced jerky in terms of economic importance. However, the Grande Seca (Great Drought) of the 1870s affected cotton farming and Fortaleza was invaded by famine. A large part of Ceará's population emigrated to the Amazon rainforest, contributing to the first rubber cycle boom. After another period of drought, the Empire began social and infrastructure projects to alleviate the consequences of the scarcity, which resulted in the creation of the Dam and Irrigation Commission (now DNOCS).

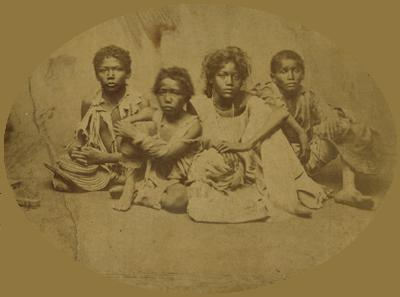
Victims of the Grande Seca of 1877–1878 in Ceará.

In the 19th century, an abolitionist campaign emerged in Ceará that abolished slavery in the state on March 25, 1884, before the Golden Law of 1888. Within Ceará, the first municipality to abolish slavery was Acarape, which was renamed Redenção after the event. Abolitionism was favored by the low importance of slavery in Ceará's economy compared to other regions of Brazil. It had the support of the Catholic Church, whose main figure was Father João Augusto da Frota, and groups composed of women from the state's elite.

Due to the great difficulty in docking ships because of the rough seas, Fortaleza was a very poor anchorage, which made the jangadeiros an extremely important element for the local economy, since embarkation and disembarkation at the city's port had to be done by means of small boats known as jangadas. Under the slogan "No more slaves embarked in Ceará", the movement led by Francisco José do Nascimento, known as "Dragão do Mar" today the name of a cultural center in the city of Fortaleza, won significant sympathy from the people of Ceará.

== Republican period ==
=== First Republic ===
After the proclamation of the Brazilian Republic in 1889, Ceará's political and economic situation began to change. A few years later, the powerful Accioly oligarchy began, named after the Freemason Antônio Pinto Nogueira Accioly, who ruled the state in an authoritarian and monolithic regime between 1896 and 1912. During this period, the Accioly family literally controlled every sphere of power in Ceará, from the highest positions in the state government to the police stations. At that time, the situation of extreme poverty and social abandonment was a profound trait of Ceará, which led to the emergence of several messianic movements throughout the 19th and 20th centuries, such as the Caldeirão de Santa Cruz do Deserto in Crato, whose religious leaders included Antônio Conselheiro (who formed the arraial of Canudos in Bahia), Padre Ibiapina, Padre Cícero and Beato Zé Lourenço. The cangaço also emerged as a way of escaping poverty, with bands sacking villages, robbing and frightening everyone.

In addition to these events, in 1896 the Sobral-Crateus railroad began to be built by Antonio Sampaio Pires Ferreira, whose banks would soon become the site of the town of Pires Ferreira. For Ceará, the 20th century was marked by the cycles of power of the "coronéis" and by enormous social and economic transformations.

Thanks to the Salvation Policy promoted by President Hermes da Fonseca, who sought to weaken the regional oligarchies opposed to his power, Ceará was going through a turbulent and violent electoral campaign. Based on this movement, Franco Rabelo's candidacy for the government was launched, while Accioly named Domingos Carneiro as his candidate. In Fortaleza, there was a children's march in favor of Franco Rabelo, which was harshly repressed by the police, causing the death of some children and injuring many others.

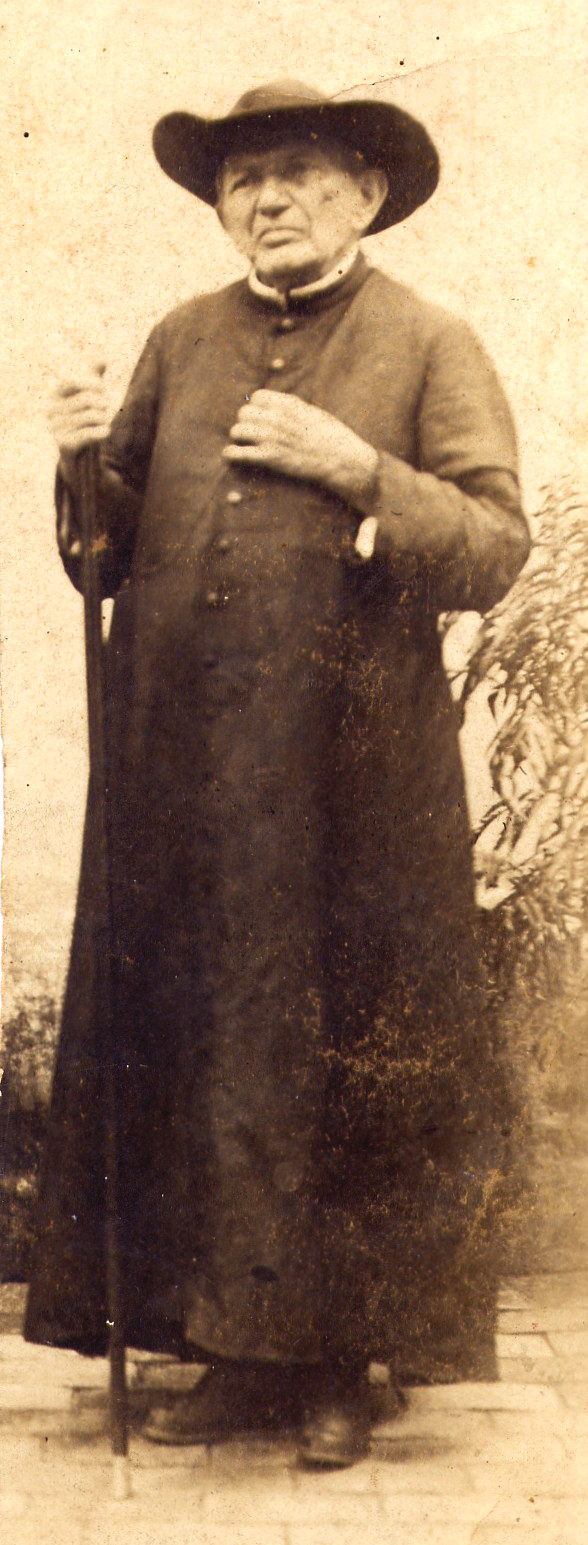
Padre Cícero, an important leader in early 20th century Ceará.

As a result, the population of Fortaleza revolted against the government, immersing the capital in a state of civil war for three days. Accioly had to resign from the Ceará government, but was guaranteed the right to stay alive and flee the state. Soon after, Franco Rabelo was elected to govern Ceará, but ended up being ousted by another revolt, the Juazeiro Sedition, between 1913 and 1914.

The emergence of Juazeiro do Norte, a city emancipated from Crato, was due to the charismatic Padre Cícero who, after becoming famous due to the supposed miracle of Maria de Araújo, whose wafer was said to have turned into blood, won over an immense mass of poor and religious sertanejos. Many people moved to Juazeiro, and in a short time, the place had thousands of residents. Since he didn't have the support of the Catholic hierarchy, Padre Cícero tried to prevent Juazeiro from suffering the same tragic end as Canudos and allied himself with the political power of the "coronéis", taking his place alongside the oligarchy of Nogueira Accioly. Although he remained close to the people, the priest became, for some, a "coronel de batinas".

Soon, Franco Rabelo lost the support of many politicians who had helped him come to power. The oppositionists then tried to convene an extraordinary session of the Legislative Assembly in Juazeiro and overthrew Rabelo, who still had a lot of support in Fortaleza and sent troops to Juazeiro do Norte to defeat the coup plotters. The sertanejos, incited by Padre Cícero and the "coronéis", believed that this was an aggression against the father. After months of fighting, Padre Cícero's followers defeated Rabelo's troops and began a long march to Fortaleza, forcing him to resign from the government of Ceará. After the Juazeiro Sedition, a certain balance was established between the oligarchies of Ceará and no more military conflicts took place between them. The people, however, remained repressed and voiceless.

=== Estado Novo ===
The political situation in Ceará changed considerably with the Revolution of 1930, which brought Getúlio Vargas to power. For 15 years, the state was governed by federal government interventors. The first interventor in Ceará was Fernandes Távora, but he ruled for only a short time, as he continued with the clientelist and corrupt practices of the First Republic. During this period, Ceará's political scene was influenced by two associations: the Catholic Electoral League (LEC), which, due to its religious ties and support from landowners in the interior, had great penetration in Ceará's electorate and supported segments such as the Brazilian Integralist Action (AIB) in Ceará; and the Ceará Legion of Labour (LCT), a Catholic, conservative workers', corporatist, anti-communist and anti-liberal organization that existed in the state between 1931 and 1937.

After the exile of its leader and creator Severino Sombra for his support of the Constitutionalist Revolution in São Paulo in 1932, the LCT lost power and many of its members became part of the Brazilian Integralist Action. On his return from exile, Sombra abandoned the LCT and founded the Legionary Campaign, but it was unsuccessful, as the Catholic Church in Ceará was now supporting the AIB and left-wing workers' organizations were beginning to emerge in the state. Finally, in 1937, all the Catholic-oriented associations (LCT, AIB and the Legionary Campaign) were abolished by Getúlio Vargas' Estado Novo.

During the droughts of 1915 and 1932, concentration camps, also known as "currais do governo", were set up in Ceará. Their aim was to prevent migrants fleeing the famine from reaching the big cities.

An important social movement in the Vargas era was the Caldeirão. Similar to Canudos, it brought together around 3,000 people under the leadership of Zé Lourenço, a Paraíba native who had arrived in Juazeiro do Norte around 1890 and was a follower of Padre Cícero. Advised by him to settle in the region and work with some of the itinerant families, Zé Lourenço rented a plot of land on the Baixa Danta site in the city. The site prospered and began to displease some of the elite and to be slandered by Padre Cícero's political opponents. This led to the owner of the Baixa Danta site demanding that the peasants, along with Zé, leave the land.

The group settled on the Caldeirão site in Crato, owned by Padre Cícero, the peasants formed a small collective and egalitarian society, prospering so much that they even sold their surpluses in neighboring towns. The place became a "bad example" for the sertanejos and strongly displeased the Church and the landowners who were losing cheap workforce. The slander culminated in the accusation that the Beato Zé Lourenço was a Bolshevik agent. When Padre Cícero died in 1934, the land was inherited by the Salesian priests and the Caldeirão peasants were left destitute. In September 1936, the community was dispersed and the site was burned down and bombed. Zé Lourenço and his followers then headed for a new community. Some of the inhabitants, however, decided to take revenge and ambushed some policemen, which was replied with a total massacre of peasants.

At the beginning of the 1940s, Ceará was influenced by the World War II and the implementations of the Washington Accords. An American base was set up in Fortaleza, changing local habits and exciting the population, who began to hold various acts, demonstrations and marches against Nazism. The Special Service for the Mobilization of Workers for the Amazon - SEMTA was created in Fortaleza and carried out strong government propaganda which encouraged the sertanejos to migrate to the Amazon, where they would become the Rubber Soldiers.

The fight against Nazism and the contradictory position of the Brazilian government (which was under a fascist regime) accelerated the collapse of the Estado Novo. Several new parties were formed, such as the UDN, the PSD, the PCB and the PSP. The UDN and PSD, conservative and elitist parties, would dominate Ceará's political scene for decades, while the PSP, headed by Olavo Oliveira, would be, at least in the 1950s, the "balance" in electoral disputes. It's worth remembering that, despite all the political changes, Ceará was then one of the most miserable places in Brazil.

=== Fourth Republic ===
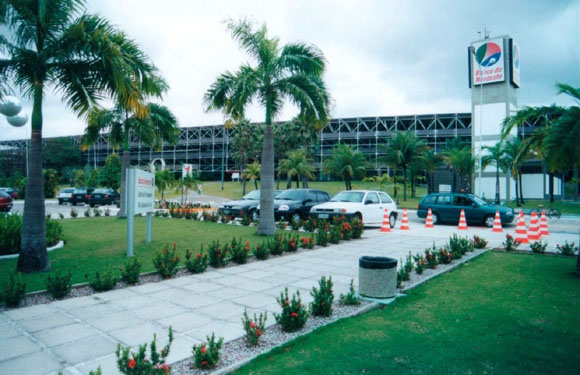
View of the current headquarters of the Banco do Nordeste, established in Fortaleza in 1954.

The Fourth Republic period in Ceará began with the election of Faustino de Albuquerque by the UDN. During his administration, in the 1950 general elections, Eduardo Gomes, a presidential candidate from the same party, won the most votes and placed Getúlio Vargas third in the state. For the state government, Raul Barbosa was elected, one of the people responsible, along with Ceará's parliamentarians, for the campaign to get the headquarters of the Banco do Nordeste do Brasil, founded in 1952, to move to Fortaleza. In the same year, the federal government officially inaugurated the Port of Mucuripe. Thermoelectric plants were installed around it to provide Fortaleza with plenty of electricity.

During the 1950s, several economic groups in Ceará grew stronger, such as Deib Otoch, J. Macêdo, M. Dias Branco, Grande Moinho Cearense and Edson Queiroz. The 1950s also saw the start of a new wave of migration to various states and regions. Within a decade, the state's representation of the Brazilian population fell from 5.1% to 4.5%. In 1955, Emília Barreto Correia Lima from Ceará was elected Miss Brazil.

In 1958, Parsifal Barroso was elected with the help of the federal government to combat the problems caused by droughts; the main project was the Orós Dam, inaugurated in 1961. In Fortaleza, the Cine São Luis was also inaugurated. In 1962, Parsifal began building the Palácio da Abolição, the new seat of government and created the Banco do Estado do Ceará (BEC).

In 1963, Virgílio Távora was elected governor of Ceará and his administration was marked by the creation of the government's Plano de Metas, which aimed to modernize the state's structure with the expansion of the Port of Mucuripe and the transmission of energy from Paulo Afonso. The Industrial District of Maracanaú, BEC, CODEC and Companhia DOCAS do Ceará were also created and installed during his administration. With AI-2, Virgílio joined ARENA, and his vice-president Figueiredo Correia joined the MDB.

=== Military government ===
In 1966, Plácido Castelo was elected by the Legislative Assembly and his government was marked by political persecution of deputies and various manifestations with the arrest and torture of students and workers, including bombings in Fortaleza. He also created BANDECE, paved the CE-060 highway and began work on the Castelão stadium.

The height of military repression occurred during the government of César Cals. He sought to govern technocratically, forming his own political faction and breaking with Virgílio Távora. There were no major changes in the mandate of his successor, Adauto Bezerra, since he resigned his term to stand for election as a federal deputy; Waldemar Alcântara finished his term.

In 1979, Virgilio Távora returned to office as the last person to be indirectly elected and revived his first government with the creation of PLAMEG II. He initiated the industrialization of the northwestern region of Ceará and created PROMOVALE, while his wife, Luiza Távora, implemented social projects such as the Ceará Handicrafts Center. His government was marked by the almost total absence of opposition in the Assembly, the appointment of approximately 16,000 people to public positions and several strikes. Gonzaga Mota was elected by popular vote and took office in 1983, breaking with the previous "coronéis" to create his own political group. His rupture earned him attacks from the military regime with the suspension of federal funds.

=== Sixth Republic ===
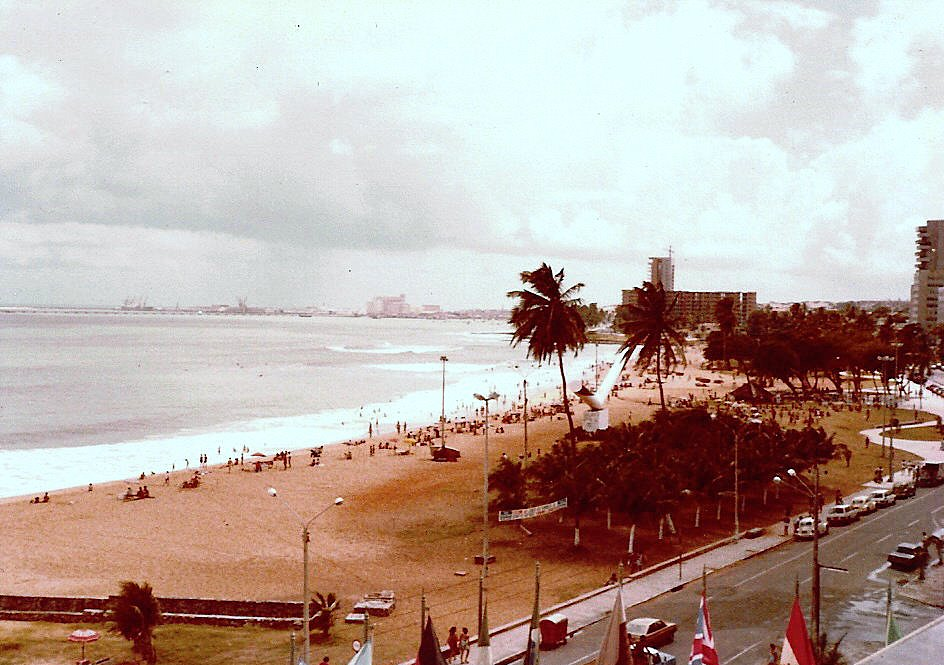
View of Fortaleza's coastline in the 1980s, with a view of the monument to the Ocean Interceptor.

The Sixth Republic began in Ceará with the election of Maria Luiza as mayor of Fortaleza in 1986. She was the first female mayor of a state capital elected by the Workers' Party and the first female politician to be elected to this position after the military regime. Dissatisfaction with the politics practiced during the dictatorship and the redemocratization movement spurred transformations in political power and the decline of the traditional hegemony of coronelism.

Gonzaga Mota left office with late payments to civil servants and uncontrolled public accounts, but his candidate, businessman Tasso Jereissati, managed to get elected with the promise of modernizing public administration, moving away from the clientelism of previous governments, promoting fiscal austerity and developing the state economy. The new administration renamed itself the "Government of Change". Over the next two decades, Jereissati and his allies came to hold political hegemony in the state, and quickly lost their alliance with left-wing parties such as the PT and PCdoB.

In 1990, Ciro Gomes, then mayor of Fortaleza, ran for governor with Tasso's support and was elected. With the opening up of the Brazilian market, Ceará receives the first imported cars from the Russian brand Lada. His administration prioritized increased public and private investment in infrastructure and the industrial and services sectors, while agriculture remained marginalized. Politically, there was a relative reduction in the power of the "coronéis" and an increase in the power of big business. The reorganization of state accounts - partly achieved by reducing civil service expenses through layoffs and salary cuts - guaranteed surpluses between 1988 and 1994, but the consolidation of the Real Plan led to a predominance of deficits.

The state also benefits from the tax resistance which, together with cheap workforce, attracts many industries. In the 1990s, average GDP growth was higher than the national and Northeastern. The actions of the government, combined with the efforts of local businesspeople and the incentives of institutions of great importance in Ceará's recent economic history, such as the BNB and Sudene, were decisive for this performance.

Throughout the decade, with actions such as the Family Health Program (PSF), Ceará also achieved progress in reducing infant mortality. Migration towards Fortaleza remains strong, due to the persistent delay in the interior compared to the strong growth of the capital. Public security became much more problematic between 1990 and 2003, with the homicide rate rising from 8.86 to 20.15 per 100,000 inhabitants, an increase of 127%.

Tasso, elected again in 1994 and re-elected in 1998, concentrated his government's efforts on building and renovating major projects, such as the Port of Pecém, the new Fortaleza International Airport, the Castanhão Dam and Metrofor. His government was characterized by the privatization of state-owned companies, the abolition of other agencies and the pursuit of neoliberal-inspired policies, with the downsizing of the administrative machine, the rationalization of investments and an increase in pension contribution rates.

However, despite several advances in basic health and education and stable economic growth, the Tasso era did not change Ceará's problematic socio-economic structure, especially the lack of income distribution, which was strongly questioned. At the beginning of the 21st century, the tendency for the emigration of Ceará's traditional population fell, but was reversed a few years later thanks to the improvement in living conditions and the greater stability provided by social programs, which allowed people to stay in their homeland and allowed some of the emigrants to return.

Lúcio Alcântara, elected with Tasso's support, continued the political model of the previous governments, but received no support from his own party and failed to win re-election in 2006, breaking with the PSDB and switching to the Republic Party after leaving office. Cid Gomes, of the PSB and former mayor of Sobral, becomes governor, ending the PSDB's long hegemony in the state and signaling a move towards opposition in state politics, already demonstrated with the victory of Luizianne Lins, of the PT, in the capital, who was elected in 2004 even without real support from the party, which had supported the candidate Inácio Arruda due to national party alliances. In 2008, Luizianne Lins was re-elected.

== See also ==
- History of Brazil
