= List of lakes of Brazil =

The following is a list of major lakes of Brazil.

- Agua Vermelha
- Araros Lake
- Baia de Caxiuana
- Balbina Dam
- Banabuiu Lake
- Bariri Reservoir
- Billings Reservoir
- Caracaranã
- Castanhão Dam
- Coari Lake
- Emborcacao Dam
- Furnas Lake
- Grajau Lake
- Grande de Manacapuru
- Guarapiranga
- Ibitinga Reservoir
- Itaparica Reservoir
- Itarare Lake
- Itumbiara Dam
- Lake Juturnaiba
- Represa de Eng Souza Dias (Jupia)
- Marimbondo Dam
- Mirim Lagoon, on the border with Uruguay
- Mundaú Lagoon
- Oros Lake
- Paranoá Lake
- Patos Lagoon
- Eng Sérgio Motta Dam (Porto Primavera)
- Sao Simao Dam
- Serra da Mesa Dam (Sao Felix)
- Sobradinho Reservoir
- Tapajos Lake

== Sources ==
- LakeNet at Worldlakes.org

== See also ==
- Movimento dos Atingidos por Barragens
