= Castanhão Ecological Station =

Ecological station in Brazil

- Estação Ecológica do Castanhão
- IUCN category Ia (strict nature reserve)
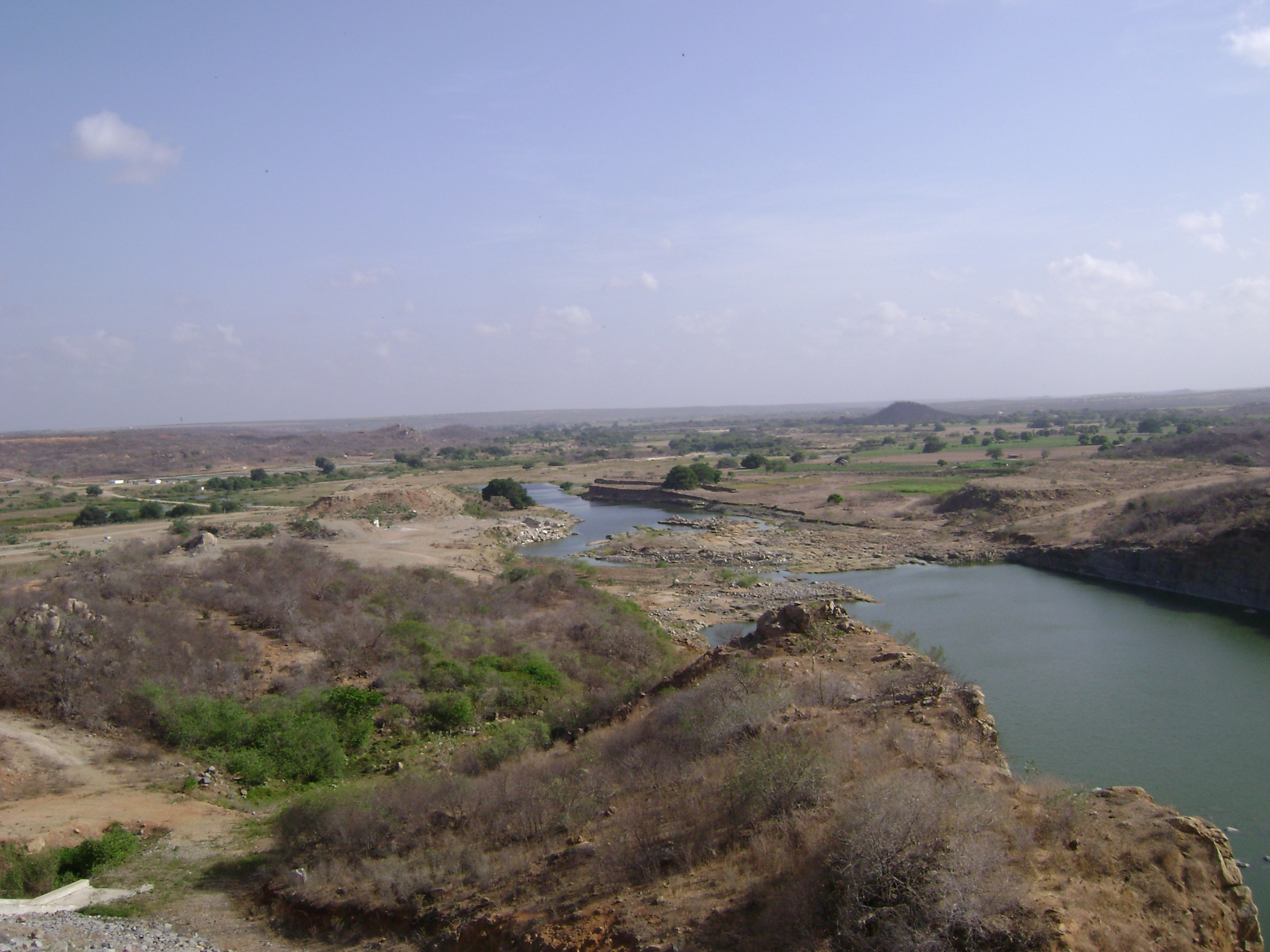
- Landscape of the Castanhão Dam

- Location within Brazil
- Nearest city: Jaguaribara, Ceará
- Coordinates: 5°36′42″S 38°30′04″W
- Area: 12,579 ha (48.57 sq mi)
- Designation: Ecological station
- Created: 27 September 2001
- Administrator: Chico Mendes Institute for Biodiversity Conservation

The Castanhão Ecological Station (Portuguese: Estação Ecológica do Castanhão) is an ecological station (ESEC) in the state of Ceará, Brazil. It protects an area of caatinga vegetation adapted to arid conditions to the south of the Castanhão Dam.

== Location ==
The Castanhão Ecological Station is divided between the municipalities of Alto Santo (0.75%), Iracema (15.2%) and Jaguaribara (84.04%) in the state of Ceará. It has an area of 12,579 hectares (31,080 acres). The ESEC is about 270 kilometres (170 mi) from Fortaleza. It is in the Sertaneja Depression of the Sertanejos Residual Plateaus. Terrain is mostly smooth or gently undulating. The ESEC is in the Jaguaribe River basin, which covers just over 51% of the state.

== History ==
The Castanhão Dam is one of the most important projects of DNOCS (National Department of Drought Works) and the largest dam in Brazil on an intermittent river. It was controversial, forcing relocation of thousands of people and relocation of the municipal seat of Jaguaribara. The Castanhão Ecological Station was created in compensation for the environmental impact of the dam.

The ESEC was created by federal decree on 27 September 2001. It is administered by the Chico Mendes Institute for Biodiversity Conservation (ICMBio). The ESEC is classed as IUCN protected area category Ia (strict nature reserve). Objectives are to protect and preserve samples of the caatinga ecosystem, and to enable development of scientific research and environmental education programs.

In 2006 it was announced that the ESEC would be almost doubled in area to 23,000 hectares (57,000 acres), encompassing the Serra da Micaela. This was because the high areas contain the sources of the rivers, important for conservation. IBAMA would install an office in Nova Jaguaribara for research into the caatinga, and the flora and fauna of the area. As of 2017 the ICMBio website still showed the area as 12,574.44 hectares (31,072.1 acres).

== Environment ==
The ESEC has a tropical southern austral semi-arid climate. Annual rainfall ranges from 750 to 1,000 millimetres (30 to 39 in). Average temperature is 27 °C (81 °F).

36% of the area is used for agriculture and 15.7% is devoid of vegetation. 18.2% contains original vegetation. Native vegetation is mostly woody, grassy savanna in the caatinga biome, with scattered shrub sized hyperxerophilic plants. The main species are Mimosa acustipula and Crotoneae species, pioneer plants following strong human disruption of the environment.

== Sources ==
- "Área ecológica será duplicada", O Povo (in Portuguese), Fortaleza, CE, 4 March 2006, archived from the original on 22 February 2017
- Esec do Castanhão (in Portuguese), ICMBio: Instituto Chico Mendes de Conservação da Biodiversidade
- ESEC do Castanhão (in Portuguese), ISA: Instituto Socioambiental
- Mendes de Sena, Liana Mara (2011), Estação Ecológica do Castanhão – CE: Análise Geoecológica da Paisagem e Proposta de Gestão Ambiental (PDF) (in Portuguese), Fortaleza: Universidade Federal do Ceará
- Unidade de Conservação: Estação Ecológica do Castanhão (in Portuguese), MMA: Ministério do Meio Ambiente
