= Arara, Paraíba =

Coordinates: 06°49′40″S 35°45′28″W

Arara
- Municipality
- The Municipality of Arara
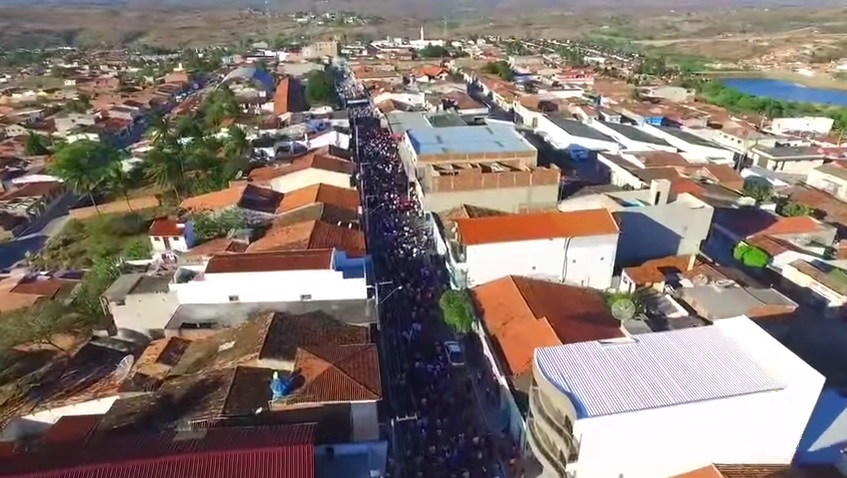
- Panoramic view of the city

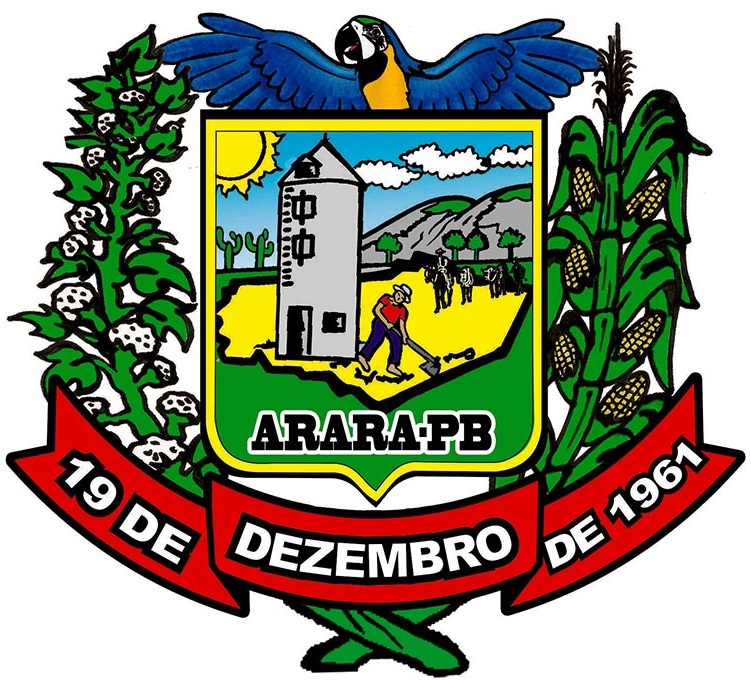
- Flag Coat of arms

- Location of Arara in the State of Paraíba

- Country: Brazil
- Region: Northeast
- State: Paraíba
- Founded: December 1, 1961

Government
  - Mayor: José Ailton Pereira da Silva (PSL)

Area
  - Total: 99,112 km^{2} (38,267 sq mi)
- Elevation: 467 m (1,532 ft)

Population (2020)
  - Total: 13,542
  - Density: 133.7/km^{2} (346/sq mi)
- Time zone: UTC−3 (BRT)
- HDI (2000): 0.551 – medium
- Website: Arara, Paraíba

Arara (Central northeastern portuguese pronunciation: [ɐˈɾaɾɐ]) is a municipality in the state of Paraíba in northeastern Brazil. It is located within the Intermediate region of João Pessoa and the Immediate region of Guarabira, with its distance from the state capital being 155 km. It is located on the Borborema plateau at an altitude of 467 m above sea level.

== History ==
Originally, the area was occupied by the Cariri people. The countryside was covered in Schinopsis brasiliensis trees, whose wood was black, known in the local indigenous language as Baraúna. The trees served as shelter for people traveling to the nearby areas of Brejo and Curimataú to buy flour, cassava and rapadura, basic foods available in those areas. The area was known as "Baraúnas das Araras" because of the large number of macaws (Portuguese arara) that could be found there as late as 1860, when the priest José Antônio Maria Ibiapina arrived in the area from Ceará. He had greatly influenced the civilizing of the Curimataú area. He founded the Santa Fé sanitarium near the site of today's city, on land donated by Major Antônio José da Cunha, owner of lime deposits in the area.

Major Antônio José da Cunha also built the first house in the future village of Arara, and contributed much to its development up to 1881, when he died at the age of 94.

Padre Ibiapina also founded the Mother Church of Arara, under the name of Nossa Senhora da Piedade (Our Lady of Piety), and provided services to the forming community. By 1876, the village had about 80 houses and 500 inhabitants.

In 1937 and 1938, in the administrative division of Brazil, Arara was mentioned as part of the municipality of Serraria. On 1 December 1961, the town was separated from Serraria and incorporated as a separate municipality. Many people worked toward this goal, including Dr. Marinésio Moreno, Dr. Mário Moreno, and Marísio da Cunha Moreno.

== Climate ==
Located on a high plain, the city has a Semi-arid climate, with average annual temperatures in the range of 22 °C. The rainy season begins in January or February, and continues to September or October.

== Demographics ==
According to the IBGE (Brazilian Institute of Geography and Statistics) of 2020, there were 13,542 people residing in the municipality. The population density was 127.66 inhabitants/km^{2}.

The last census the IBGE of 2000, revealed the following numbers: 7,109 Pardo (Brown) people (61.66%), 4,033 White people (34.98%), 350 Black people (3,03%).

== List of mayors ==
Name of Mayor	Period
Dedício Pereira de Maia	1961–1962
Marísio da Cunha Moreno	1963–1966
Joaquim Pereira de Morais	1967–1979
Reginaldo Azevedo do Nascimento	1970–1972
Joaquim Pereira de Morais	1973–1976
José Medeiros dos Santos	1977–1982
Moacir Jerônimo da Costa	1983–1988
José Medeiros dos Santos	1989–1992
José Ibiapina Soares do Nascimento	1993–1996
José Ernesto dos Santos Sobrinho	1997–2000
José Ibiapina Soares do Nascimento	2001–2004
José Ernesto dos Santos Sobrinho	2005–2008
José Ernesto dos Santos Sobrinho	2009–2012
Eraldo Fernandes de Azevedo	2013–2016
José Ailton Pereira da Silva	2017–2020
José Ailton Pereira da Silva	2021–2024
Amarildo Carvalho Pereira Filho	2025-2028
