= Guassussê =

Coordinates: 6°20′8.51″N 38°58′47.27″E

Guassussê is the geographically largest district in the municipality of Orós, Ceará, Brazil. According to the IBGE, the estimated population in 2013 was 2,880 inhabitants. Known as "channel", a small river flows through the district.

== History ==
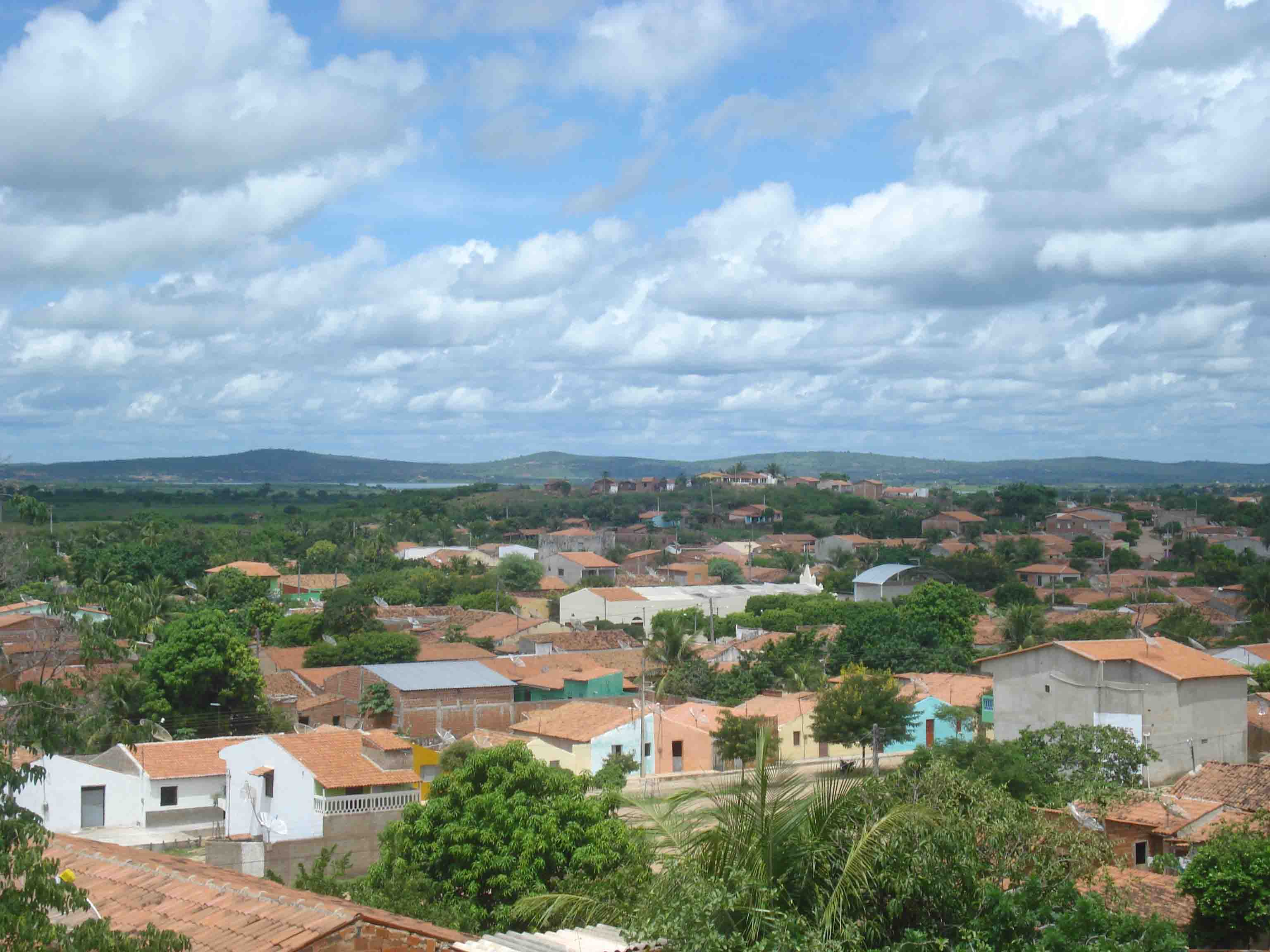
Photo taken from the Guassussê's Cruise.

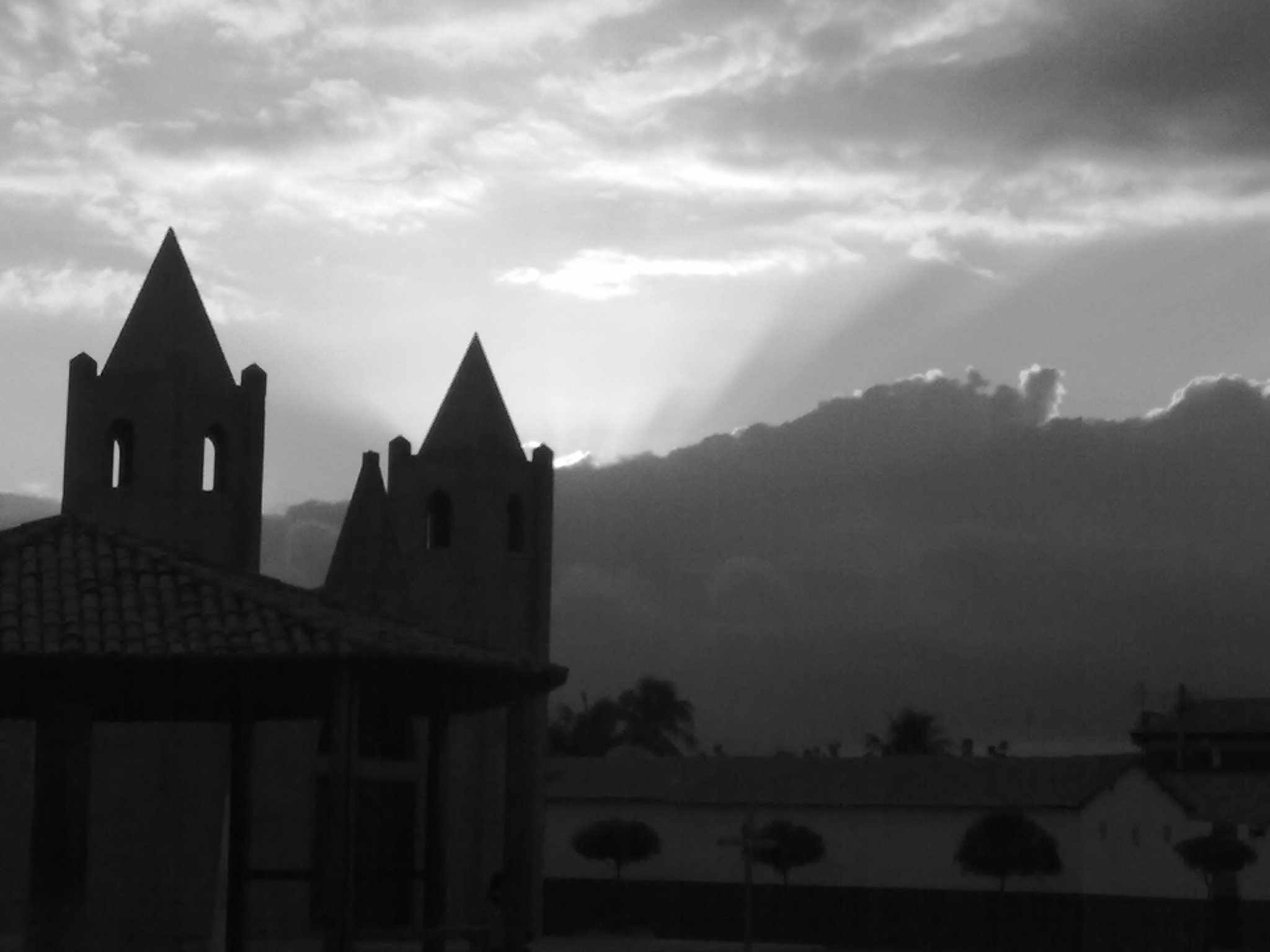
Church Guassussê Matrix at sunrise.

Guassussê's history is marked by the construction of the Orós Dam under President Juscelino Kubitschek. In 1960, when the village of Conceição do Buraco was flooded by the waters of the newly inaugurated dam, the population needed to evacuate in the middle of the night to save their lives. Distraught, residents ended up on the other side of the hills running through the region, in the property of Manoel Raimundo Montanha. He gave part of his property to the homeless and they restarted their lives in that place that later was named Guassussê.

== Economy ==
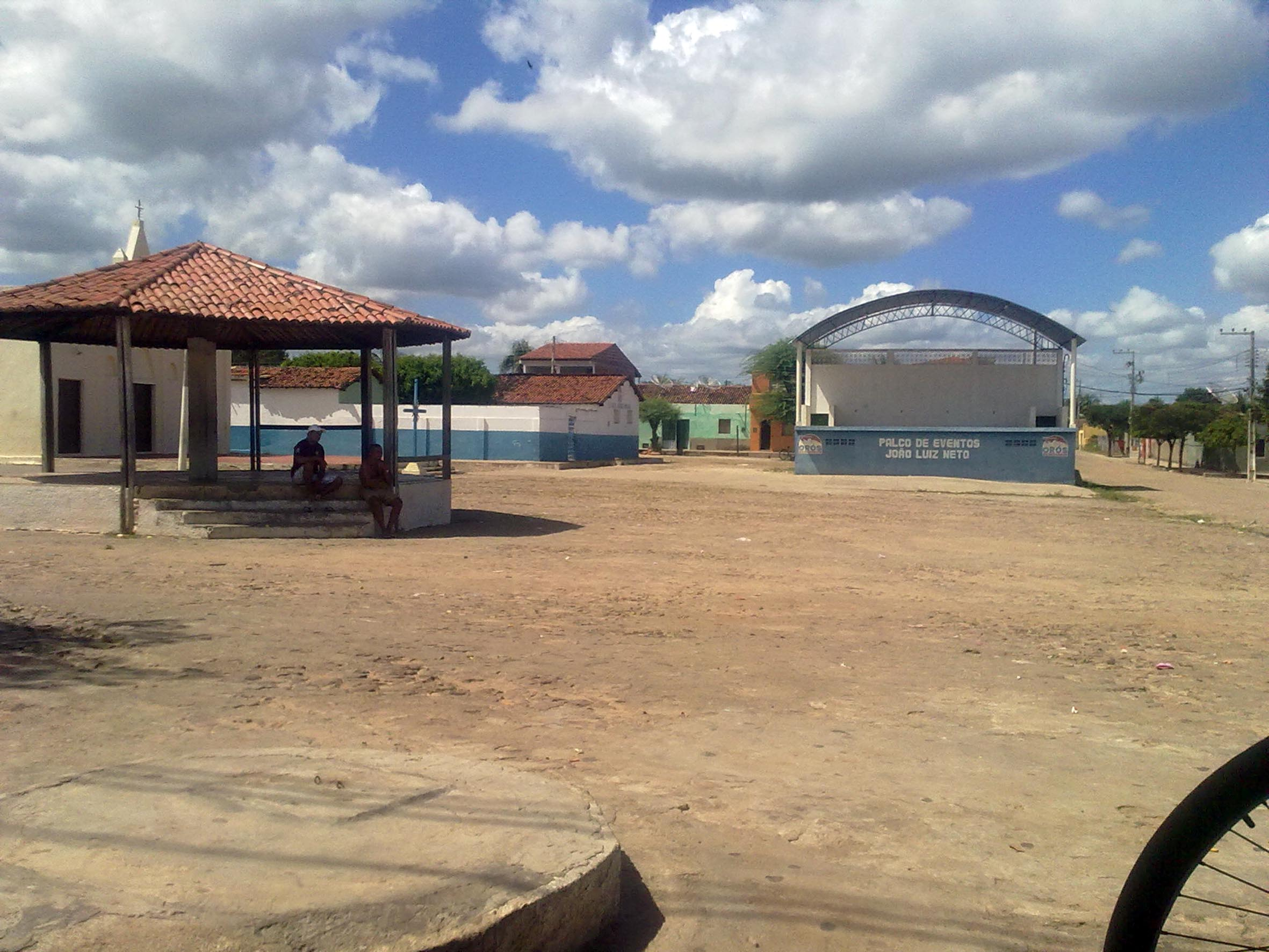
Pic from the center of Guassussê

The Guassussê district depends largely on agriculture, livestock and local businesses.

== Education ==
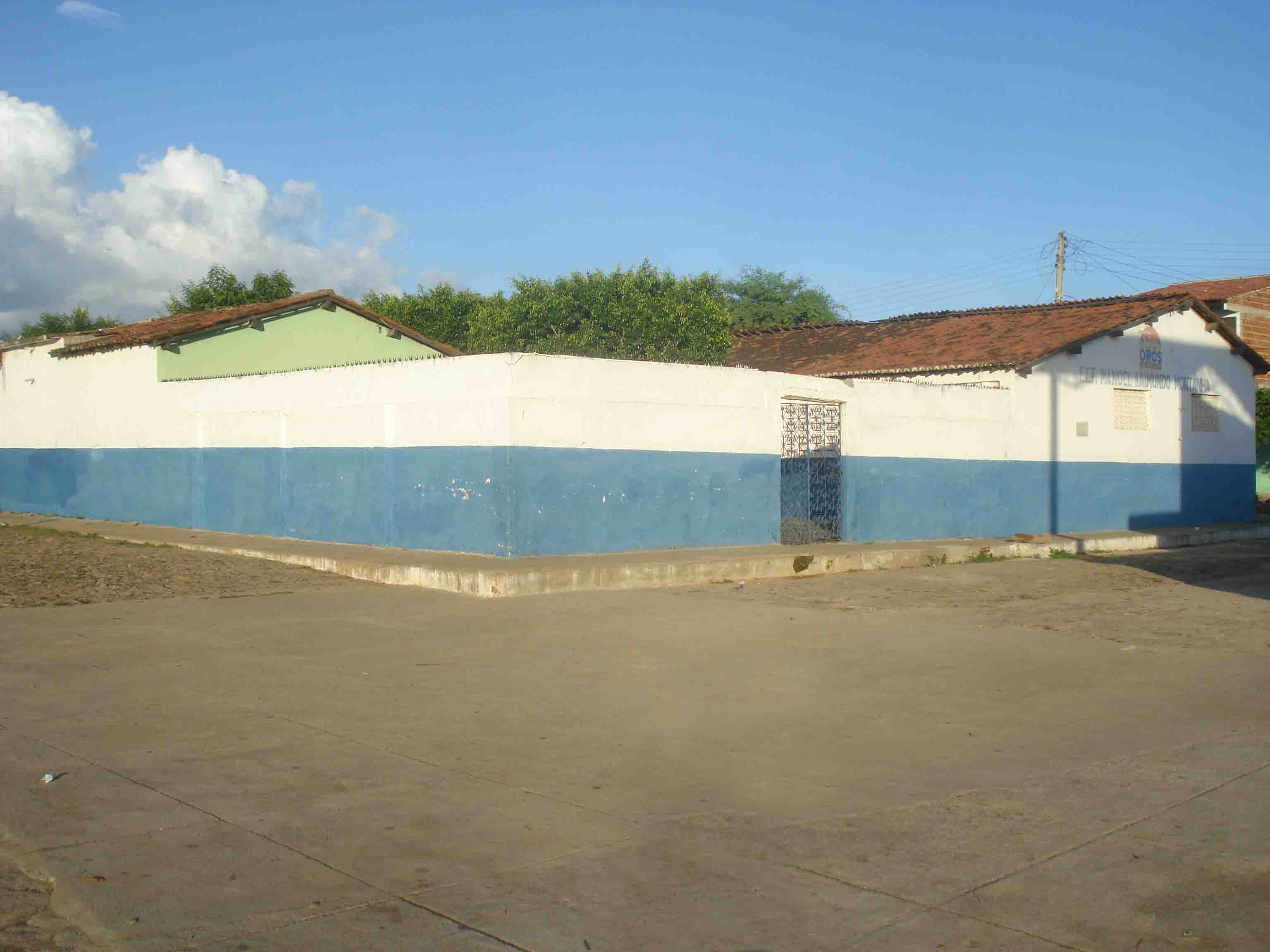
Manoel Raimundo Montanha School.

=== Preschool ===
E. E. F. Chapeuzinho Vermelho preschool operates there.

=== Elementary ===
Elementary education is provided by two schools (1st to 4th grade - EEF Manoel Raimundo Mountain - and second - EEF Isaiah Cândido Rodrigues - from 5th to 8th grade).

=== High school ===
The nearest high school is 18 km from the county seat, in Orós (Municipality Headquarters).

== Religion ==
The predominant religion is Catholicism, characterised by devotion to the district's patron saint, Our Lady of Conception. However, reflecting the phenomenon presented throughout Brazil, the number of evangelicals has increased considerably.
