= Evaldo Gouveia =

Brazilian singer-songwriter (1928–2020)

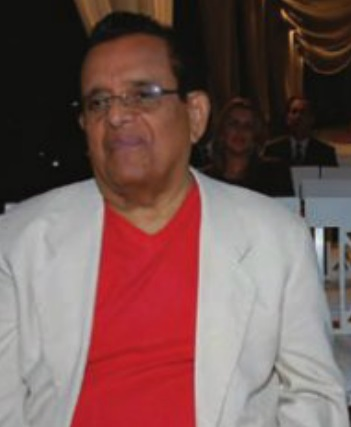

Background information
- Born: Evaldo Gouveia de Oliveira; August 8, 1928; Orós, Ceará, Brazil
- Died: May 29, 2020 (aged 91) Fortaleza, Ceará, Brazil
- Genres: MPB
- Instruments: Vocals, classical guitar
- Years active: 1940s–2011
- Labels: Abril Cultural, RCA Camden, RGE, Som Livre

Evaldo Gouveia de Oliveira (8 August 1928 – 29 May 2020), better known as simply Evaldo Gouveia, was a Brazilian singer-songwriter of the genre MPB.

== Life ==
Born in Orós, a small city in the Brazilian state of Ceará, he moved with his family to neighboring city of Iguatu when only 3 months old.

At the age of 11, he moved to his birth state capital city of Fortaleza where he started his precocious musical career. There in the 1950s he created and joined a band called Trio Nagô with his fellow musicians and friends Mário Alves and Epaminondas de Souza, releasing six studio albums and various extended plays.

Eventually, Gouveia went to Rio de Janeiro in order to pursue a solo career, and achieved stardom due to his friendship with fellow singer Altemar Dutra, who helped Gouveia by singing his songs and making them popular.

As a solo act, Gouveia released seven studio albums and various extended plays, most of them featuring fellow singers Adelino Moreira and Jair Amorim, even though they never formed a band.

== Illness and death ==
In late 2017, Gouveia suffered a stroke that left him with lifelong sequelae.

On 29 May 2020, Gouveia died in Fortaleza at the age 91 due to complications brought on by COVID-19 during the COVID-19 pandemic in Brazil.

== Discography ==
=== Studio albums ===
Year	Album	Album details
1956	Aquarela Cearense	Label: Sinter; Format: Vinyl
1956	LP Trio Nagô	Label: Independent; Format: Vinyl
1956	LP Trio Nagô	Label: Continental Records; Format: Vinyl
1958	LP Trio Nagô	Label: RCA Victor; Format: Vinyl
1959	Um passeio com o Trio Nagô	Label: RCA Victor; Format: Vinyl
1972	No tempo dos bons tempos 4 - Em tempo de nordeste (With Jorge Fernandes, Trio Marajá and Vanja Orico)	Label: Fontana Records; Format: Vinyl

=== Studio albums ===
Year	Album	Album details
1970	História da Música Popular Brasileira (With Jair Amorim)	Label: Abril Cultural; Format: Vinyl
1975	Os Grandes Sucessos de Evaldo e Jair Amorim na voz de Evaldo Gouveia	Label: RCA Camden; Format: Vinyl
1976	Brasil Especial (With Jair Amorim)	Label: Som Livre; Format: Vinyl
1977	Nova História da Música Popular Brasileira (With Adelino Moreira and Jair Amorim)	Label: Abril Cultural; Format: Vinyl
1983	História da Música Popular Brasileira - Série Grandes Compositores (With Adelino Moreira and Jair Amorim)	Label: Abril Cultural; Format: Vinyl
1990	Série Inesquecível - Grandes Compositores (With Jair Amorim)	Label: RGE; Format: Vinyl
2011	O Trovador - Uma homenagem a Evaldo Gouveia	Label: Independent; Format: CD
