= Juazeiro Sedition =

Conflict in Brazil in the 20th century

Sedição de Juazeiro
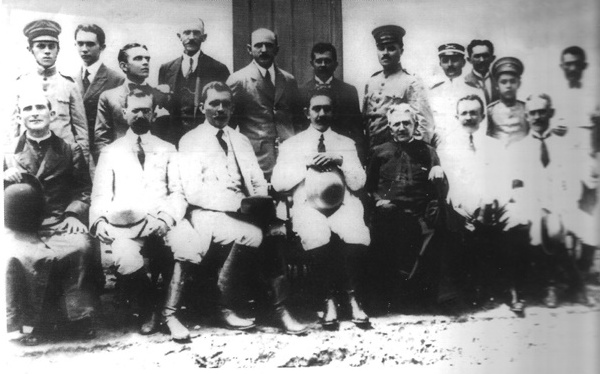
- Date: December 15, 1913 to March 15, 1914
- Location: Juazeiro do Norte, Ceará, Brazil
- Caused by: Salvation Policy
- Goals: Overthrow of the Rabelo government Establishment of the Acioly oligarchy in power Maintenance of the policy of Coronelism
- Result: Victory for the oligarchies

Parties
Federal Government of Brazil	Oligarchies of Ceará

Lead figures
Hermes da Fonseca; Marcos Franco Rabelo	Floro Bartolomeu; Nogueira Acioly; Padre Cícero

The Juazeiro Sedition, also known as the Juazeiro Revolt, was a conflict that happened in 1914 in the backlands of Cariri, in the interior of the state of Ceará. It involved the oligarchies of Ceará and the federal government and was provoked by the interference of central power in state politics in the early decades of the 20th century.

Under the leadership of Floro Bartolomeu, Nogueira Acioly and Padre Cícero, an army of peasants resisted the invasion of federal government forces and marched to Fortaleza to depose Franco Rabelo.

After the revolt, Padre Cícero was retaliated against by the Church. However, he remained a figurehead of politics in Ceará for more than a decade and did not lose his influence over the peasant population, who came to venerate him as a saint and prophet. In Juazeiro do Norte, a huge monument erected in his honor attracts crowds of pilgrims every year.

== Brazilian political context ==
From 1894 onwards, the First Republic began to consolidate in the Brazilian government, which would be dominated by the coffee elites of the states of São Paulo and Minas Gerais, later giving rise to the Café com Leite politics. While the federal government was moving towards a new form of administration with civilians in power, the military remained in office during periods marked by repression in the Canudos Campaign and the Tenentist movement in 1920.

On June 14, 1909, the Brazilian lawyer and politician Afonso Pena died after presiding over Brazil for almost three full years. The presidency was transferred to Nilo Peçanha, a man with much controversy in his political life. Despite the Governors' Policy being in force at the time, in which governors were chosen through pacts between the federal and state administrations, Nilo supported the candidacy of Marshal Hermes da Fonseca for the new presidency - supported by Minas Gerais - against Rui Barbosa and the candidate for vice-president, Albuquerque Lins, both supported by the state of São Paulo, breaking the tradition of powers that existed until then.

On March 1, 1910, Hermes da Fonseca won the elections, which increased the tension between the ruling oligarchies. His presidency was marked by the Salvation Policy, aimed at intervening in governments where the dominant oligarchy had opposed his election. The administration's actions were justified by a project to moralize political customs, alleging corruption, as well as reducing social inequalities with the appointment of military personnel instead of politicians to the positions of interventors. However, the policy weakened the government's bases and, consequently, the administration of Hemes da Fonseca, as well as provoking violent opposition from the population. The states most affected by the intervention policies were Pernambuco, Bahia, Alagoas and Ceará. According to Henry Hunt Keith, this is because this region has more pronounced individualist policies.

=== Governors' Policy ===
Also known as the "states policy", it was implemented by President Campos Sales and was in force from 1898 until 1930, when a revolution installed Getúlio Vargas as President of the Republic. The aim of this policy was to create pacts between the federal government and the oligarchies from different regions of Brazil who usually dominated the state administrations, in order to give the presidency autonomy to act.

The oligarchies could maintain their power in each state as long as they supported the executive branch's intervention in the formation of the Chamber of Deputies. As a result, the politics of the states formed strong regional nuclei of power, traditionally commanded by the wealthiest families in the region, who colluded with the federal government to maintain their privileges. However, the Governors' Policy failed during the presidency of Hermes da Fonseca, who sought to weaken the regional oligarchies as a way of designing a new power elite.

== Messianic trinity ==
The Juazeiro Sedition is known as one of the messianic movements that established conflicts with the government. The disputes of Canudos, in Bahia, in 1897, led by the religious Antônio Conselheiro, and the Contestado War, in the south of the country, in 1912, are also well known. They all occurred at the beginning of the Brazilian Republic and represented direct confrontations over the form of control exercised by both the regional oligarchies and the country's federal government. As a result, the three events became known as the "messianic trinity".

The trinity marks the emergence of coronelism in the early years of the republican government, which reshaped the ties of power between the regions, the federal government and the hegemonic circles of political power, considered a crisis in rustic society by Maria Isaura de Queiroz. Despite their differences, the three movements combined the strength of the local population in their respective regions with religious aspects, based on the characteristics of Catholicism, to found movements to contest power.

Unlike Canudos and Contestado, Juazeiro had few casualties in its movement and preserved its conservative characteristics by keeping ties with the Church and its commitment to regional and national power structures. It is important to mention that the Juazeiro Sedition included a priest, an interim president, the support of the region's hegemonic oligarchy and the strategic absence of the Brazilian army.

== Origin ==
During the first Brazilian Republic, the municipalities were under the domination of the states, as established by the Constitution of 1891. Consequently, the cities had to submit to the powers of the oligarchies that controlled their states and to the interventors determined to administer them. Until the end of the 19th century, Juazeiro do Norte, located 514 kilometers from Fortaleza, was under the tutelage of the city of Crato, in the Cariri region, a politically important environment for securing votes during Governors' Policy, since its municipalities were still poles of coronelism. Also known as the New Jerusalem, Juazeiro had grown exponentially over the years because it was a center of strength for the faithful who sought better living conditions, as well as the advice and help of Padre Cícero.

The city, which was once populated by farmers and cowboys, as well as wealthy merchants and cangaceiros, would later become the second largest city in Ceará in terms of inhabitants. Over time, Juazeiro would become known as a "sacred" city, the fruit of a miracle, receiving different adjectives that would relate its economic development to its religious fanaticism - such as Mecca of the Sertões, Brazilian Jerusalem, Holy City or City of the Mother of God - and Padre Cícero would become known as the Patriarch of Juazeiro, establishing an important power over the city and its population.

Floro Bartolomeu, a doctor and journalist from Bahia, arrived in the city in 1908 and became one of the most important figures in the city, as soon as he won the trust of Padre Cícero. In October 1911, he helped the priest win political autonomy for Juazeiro from the city of Crato. At first, the coronéis of the Cariri region were divided over the decision, but Floro Bartolomeu articulated an alliance between the regional oligarchies, known as the Pacto dos Coronéis, who agreed to strengthen political and personal ties, as well as maintaining loyalty to Antônio Nogueira Acioly, governor of Ceará and part of the politically dominant family in the state. As a result, Juazeiro was elevated to the category of town, the seat of a municipality.

While, at the national level, Hermes da Fonseca stabilized as president of the Republic and outlined a new regional power plan, the Acioly family maintained its almost hegemonic domination in Ceará. Although there were groups opposed to this oligarchy - mainly based on criticism of the economic decisions made by the family - they were considered "fragile" and "immature" for not being able to effectively defeat Nogueira Acioly's political arrangements. However, in 1912, several popular groups, newspaper writers and their respective editors, as well as student political movements were gaining strength in Fortaleza, with strong criticisms of oligarchic domination, which had remained in power since the end of the Empire. The rise of the candidate Marcos Franco Rabelo emerged as the representation of a Ceará free from oppression. He was supported mainly by large merchant sectors, dissident agrarian oligarchies and Salvationist officers, as well as the middle and lower urban layers of the city.

Also in 1912, several movements took to the streets inciting large marches, as well as a possible armed struggle if the Acioly family remained in power after the regional elections. During a children's march through the streets of Fortaleza, the police reacted with ferocity, causing the death of protesters, which culminated in pressure for the removal of Nogueira Acioly, who resigned on January 24, 1912. In the end, Franco Rabelo gained strength and was elected governor of Ceará that same year. Although the Acioly family controlled state politics, Rabelo, when he took power, refused to negotiate with the former ruling oligarchy and the federal government and allied himself with other organizations, collapsing the Pacto dos Coronéis established by Floro Bartolomeu and Padre Cícero in the Cariri region.

Rabelo began a campaign to destabilize any group that supported oppositional politics in the state based on the premise of persecuting and decimating "banditry", mostly represented by the cangaço phenomenon in the Northeast. Since the Cariri region had remained a significant force for the Acioly oligarchy since the beginning of the Republic, including the loyalty of Padre Cícero, the governor sent around 200 men from the state police to Crato to arrest bandits who were linked to opposition coronéis and who had pledged their loyalty to the Acioly family. The ruling coronel also removed politicians trusted by Padre Cícero from public office and dismissed the priest from his post as intendant of the city of Juazeiro.

As a form of retaliation, Floro Bartolomeu traveled to Rio de Janeiro in August 1913 to meet Nogueira Acioly and Senator Pinheiro Machado, an influential figure in the Northeast, to plan Rabelo's overthrow. The trip was perceived by Rabelo as a sign of a conspiracy, which led him to intensify political repression in Juazeiro. The plan, articulated by Nogueira Acioly and members of the Conservative Republican Party (PRC), was to elect Floro as the second governor of Ceará, establishing dual power, which would force a federal intervention in the state that would depose both governors.

== The conflict ==
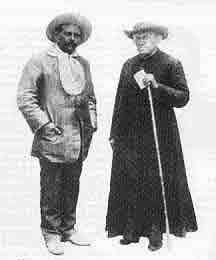
Floro Bartolomeu and Padre Cícero.

On December 15, 1913, a dissident assembly in Ceará declared Franco Rabelo's rule illegal, promptly appointing a provisional government with Floro Bartolomeu as president. However, three days later, Rabelo sent state troops to invade the city of Crato and then Juazeiro, under the command of Alípio Lopes, to put an end to the sedition.

When Rabelo's soldiers arrived in Juazeiro do Norte, they were faced with an unusual situation: Padre Cícero, on the advice of Antônio Vilanova, a former fighter in the Canudos War, and his pilgrims had dug a kind of trench around the entire city, which became known as the "Círculo da Mãe das Dores". The first offensive, on December 20, marked the first defeat of the invading forces, who decided to retreat to Crato and ask for reinforcements. Franco Rabelo sent more soldiers and a cannon to invade Juazeiro do Norte. However, the cannon failed and the troops were easily defeated by the insurgents.

On January 24, 1914, Crato was occupied by rebel troops from Juazeiro, who headed for Fortaleza with the aim of overthrowing the governor with the help of Senator Pinheiro Machado, occupying it on March 19, 1914. Along with the federal troops, Floro Bartolomeu's fighters also occupied Miguel Calmon, Senador Pompeu, Quixeramobim and other towns. Surrounded, Franco Rabelo was unable to react and was deposed on March 15, 1914.

Hermes da Fonseca appointed Fernando Setembrino de Carvalho on an interim basis, while new elections were called. Benjamin Liberato Barroso was elected governor and Padre Cícero vice again.

== See also ==
- War of Canudos
- Contestado War
- Caldeirão de Santa Cruz do Deserto
