= Caldeirão de Santa Cruz do Deserto =

Messianic movement in Brazil

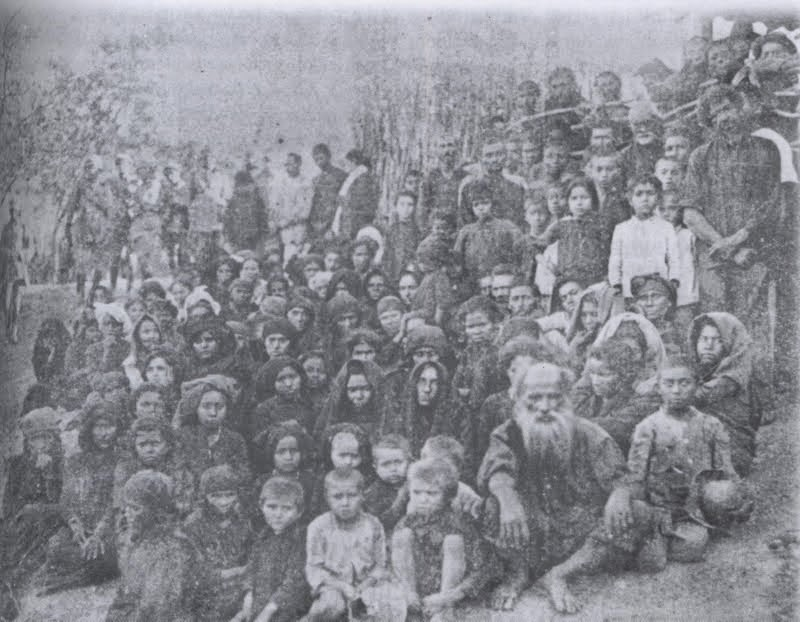
Survivors of the Caldeirão attack.

The Caldeirão da Santa Cruz do Deserto, also known as Caldeirão dos Jesuítas, was a messianic movement formed in Crato, in the Brazilian state of Ceará. The community was led by José Lourenço Gomes da Silva, better known as Beato Zé Lourenço, a native of Paraíba.

== History ==
=== Sítio Baixa Dantas ===
José Lourenço Gomes da Silva was born in Pilões de Dentro, in the state of Paraíba, in the middle of the 19th century. Extremely religious, he believed that prayer and penance would save him from hunger and poverty. At the end of the 19th century, Zé Lourenço arrived in Juazeiro do Norte, where he met Padre Cícero and gained his sympathy and trust. In Juazeiro, he managed to rent a plot of land in Sitio Baixa Dantas, in the municipality of Crato. With a lot of effort from Zé Lourenço and the other pilgrims, the land prospered. Unlike the neighboring farms, all production was divided equally in the community.

Zé Lourenço became the village leader and dedicated himself to religion, charity and serving others. Although illiterate, he was the one who distributed the tasks and taught agriculture and folk medicine. After the outbreak of the Juazeiro Sedition, which Zé Lourenço did not participate in, his land was invaded by bandits. After the revolt, Zé and his followers rebuilt the town. In 1921, Delmiro Gouveia gave Padre Cícero an ox called Mansinho and entrusted it to the care of Zé Lourenço. Padre Cícero's enemies used this as an opportunity to spread rumors that people were worshipping the ox as a god. Consequently, the ox was killed and Zé Lourenço was arrested at the behest of Floro Bartolomeu, but released under the influence of Padre Cícero a few days later.

=== Caldeirão de Santa Cruz do Deserto ===
In 1926, Sítio Baixa Dantas was sold and the new owner demanded that the members of the community leave the land. Padre Cícero decided to house Zé and the pilgrims on a large farm called Caldeirão dos Jesuítas, also located in Crato, where they started working together again and created an egalitarian society based on religion. All the produce from Caldeirão was divided equally, the surplus was sold and the profits were invested in medicines and kerosene.

In Caldeirão, each family lived in a house and orphans were Zé's godchildren. There was also a cemetery and a church built by the residents. The community reached more than a thousand inhabitants, a number that increased with the great drought of 1932. Religion drove all the work carried out. Zé Lourenço guided his followers, promoted pilgrimages, litanies and masses on holy days and Sundays. Community was based on Christian values of cooperativism, unity, solidarity and fraternity. After Padre Cícero's death, many northeasterners looked to Zé Lourenço as his successor.

=== Massacre ===
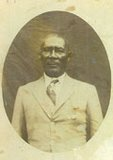
José Lourenço Gomes da Silva.

The elite of Crato believed that the religious community offered a threat to the latifundia, the exploitation of the peasants and the power of the Catholic Church, which was very conservative and linked to the local leaders. Zé Lourenço was described as a dangerous communist leader capable of leading an uprising against public order. On September 11, 1936, civil and military police entered the village, but failed to find Zé, who had hidden in the Araripe mountain range. Faced with the peaceful attitude of the inhabitants of Caldeirão, they decided to burn down the houses, expel the residents and loot their property.

The government sent Captain José Bezerra and 11 police soldiers from Juazeiro do Norte to spy on the people of Caldeirão, but they were discovered and confronted by a group of peasants. Captain Bezerra, three soldiers and five peasants were killed. The authorities in Crato and the Ceará press reported that fanatics planned to invade the city, kill and destroy everything. The rumour reached Meneses Pimentel, the governor of Ceará, who asked for support from the Minister of War, Eurico Gaspar Dutra. He authorized the commander of the 7th Military Region to provide the necessary assistance.

In the early hours of May 11, 1937, two planes and 200 soldiers destroyed the village and shot the settlers. The people who didn't die on the spot were hunted down by policemen and bandits working for the colonels; many of them were beheaded. Around a thousand workers, including old people, women and children, were murdered. The Brazilian Army and the Ceará Military Police refused to provide information on the location of the mass grave in which Zé Lourenço's followers were buried, but it is presumed to be located in Caldeirão or Mata dos Cavalos, in the Cariri region. Zé Lourenço fled to Pernambuco, where he died at the age of 74 from bubonic plague. The Brazilian Army kept no records of the operation and denies that the massacre ever occurred.

== Present day ==
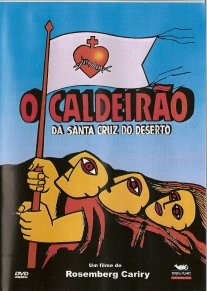
Poster for the movie O Caldeirão da Santa Cruz do Deserto.

In 2022, the Caldeirão de Santa Cruz do Deserto area became a state park with more than 7,000 square meters. Every year, hundreds of Catholics gather at dawn to attend the Caldeirão da Santa Cruz pilgrimage as a way of recovering Zé's story and remembering the victims who died at the site. Besides the annual pilgrimage, a project called Caldeirão Hoje aims to keep the memory of the place vivid and transform the area into a tourist attraction recognized throughout the Northeast. In 1986, filmmaker Rosemberg Cariry made a documentary with testimonies from survivors of the massacre.

In 2008, the NGO SOS Direitos Humanos filed a public civil action against the government of Ceará and the Brazilian Army asking the authorities to reveal the location of the mass grave, exhume the bodies and compensate the families of the dead and the remaining survivors, as well as including the massacre in the official history. The lawsuit was dismissed without judgment on the merits by the 16th Federal Court of Juazeiro do Norte. In 2009, the NGO denounced Brazil to the Organization of American States for the crime of forced disappearance of people and demanded that Brazil provide information on the location of the mass grave containing the 1000 victims of Sítio Caldeirão.

== See also ==
- Juazeiro Sedition
- Canudos War
- List of wars involving Brazil
- List of rebellions and revolutions in Brazil

== Bibliography ==
- Farias, Airton de (1997). História do Ceará : dos índios à geração cambeba. Fortaleza: Tropical.
- Aguiar, Cláudio (2000). Caldeirão: a guerra dos beatos (3 ed.). Calibán.
- Alves, Tarcisio (1994). A Santa Cruz do Deserto. Recife: UFPE.
- Galvão, F. F. (2006). Do coronelismo ao Caldeirão. Fortaleza: ABC Ed.
- Ramos, Francisco Regis (1991). Caldeirão. Fortaleza: EDUECE.
- Oliveira, Ruy Bruno (1998). De Caldeirão a Pau de Colher: a guerra dos caceteiros. Engeo. ISBN 978-85-900751-1-0.
