= Arena Coliseu Mateus Aquino =

Football stadium in Ceará, Brazil

Arena Coliseu
- "Coliseu do Sertão"
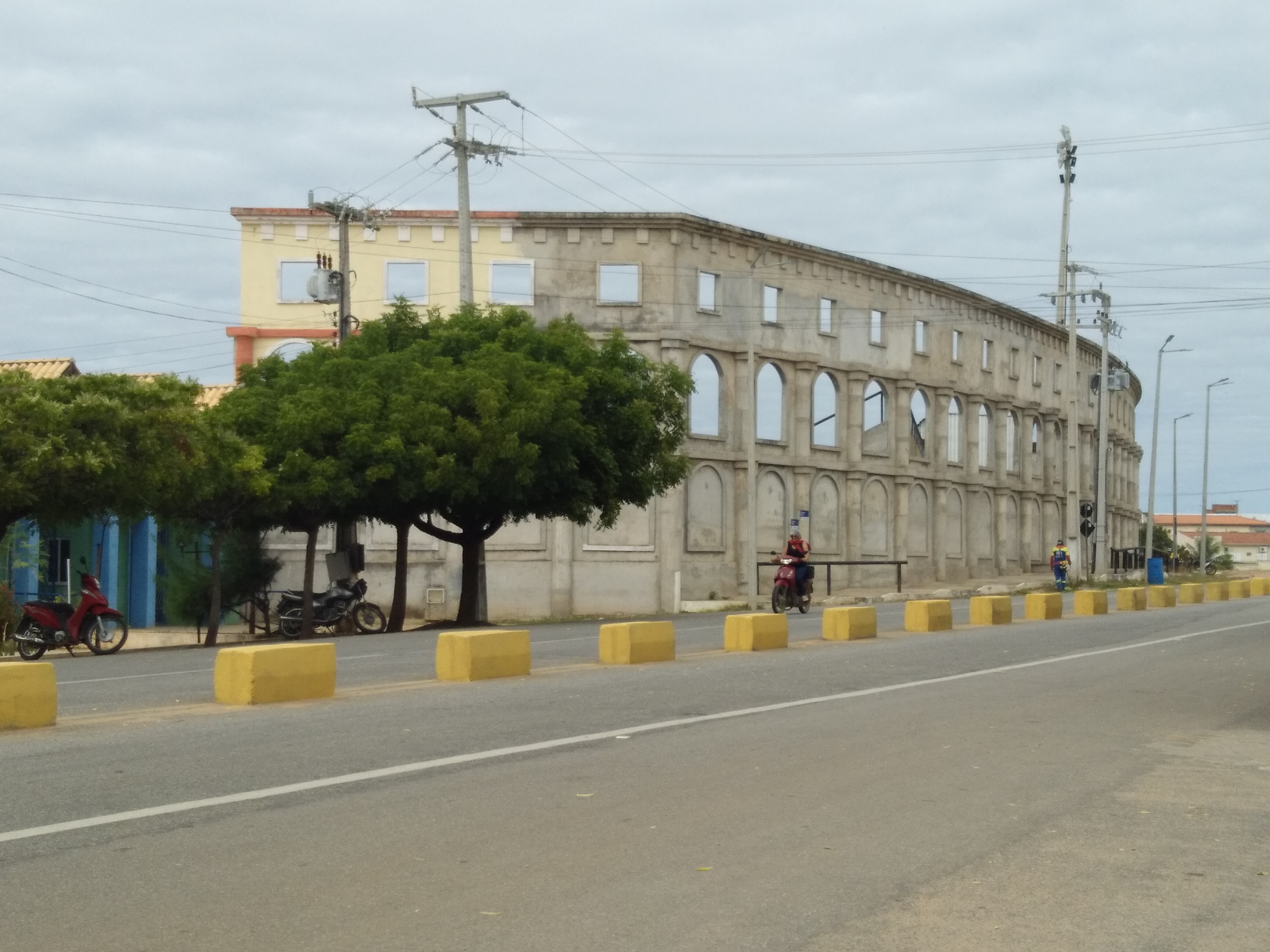
- Interactive map of Arena Coliseu
- Full name: Arena Coliseu Mateus Aquino
- Location: Alto Santo, Ceará, Brazil
- Coordinates: 5°30′51″S 38°15′57″W
- Owner: Municipality of Alto Santo
- Operator: Municipality of Alto Santo
- Capacity: 5,000
- Surface: Grass
- Field size: 105 x 68 m

Construction
- Groundbreaking: 2009
- Built: 2009–2015
- Opened: August 9, 2015
- Cost: BRL 1.3 million

Tenant
- Alto Santo Esporte Clube

Arena Coliseu Mateus Aquino (Mateus Aquino Colosseum Arena), also known as Coliseu do Sertão, is a Brazilian football stadium located at the entrance to the urban area of Alto Santo, a municipality in Ceará located in the Baixo Jaguaribe micro-region, 243 kilometers from Fortaleza. It gained national and even international fame for its peculiar structure and the controversy about the construction.

== Construction ==
Inspired by the Roman Colosseum, construction began in 2009 and cost around BRL 1.3 million, with BRL 827,500 being granted by the Ministry of Sports. It was planned to hold 20,000 people, but finished with just 5,000.

== Opening ==
The first official match at the Coliseu was in August 9 between Alto Santo Esporte Clube and União de Brejo Santo, for the debut of the 2015 Campeonato Cearense Série C. The audience was only 900 people despite the low ticket price by BRL 5. The hosts won 1–0 with a goal by Valdison at 65'.

== Controversy ==
Despite the region's semi-arid climate and the long drought at the time, a dam was filled in for the construction of the stadium. (Note: Coincidentally, the original Colosseum in Rome was also built over a water source.) The lawn was the first part completed, staying six years unused, generating expenses with irrigation, fertilization and pruning.

At the beginning of the works, the city's football club was inactive because of debts, which raised more doubts about the need for the venue. So the local authorities reactivated the Alto Santo Esporte Clube in the year of opening.

In the project, the stadium should hold 20 thousand spectators, a number greater than the population of the municipality (16 thousand at the time). However, it was completed with only 5 thousand capacity. But the municipal government promised to complete the other 15,000, which will result in more unnecessary expenses.
