= Lake Juturnaiba =

Lake in Rio de Janeiro, Brazil

- Lagoa de Juturnaíba (Portuguese)
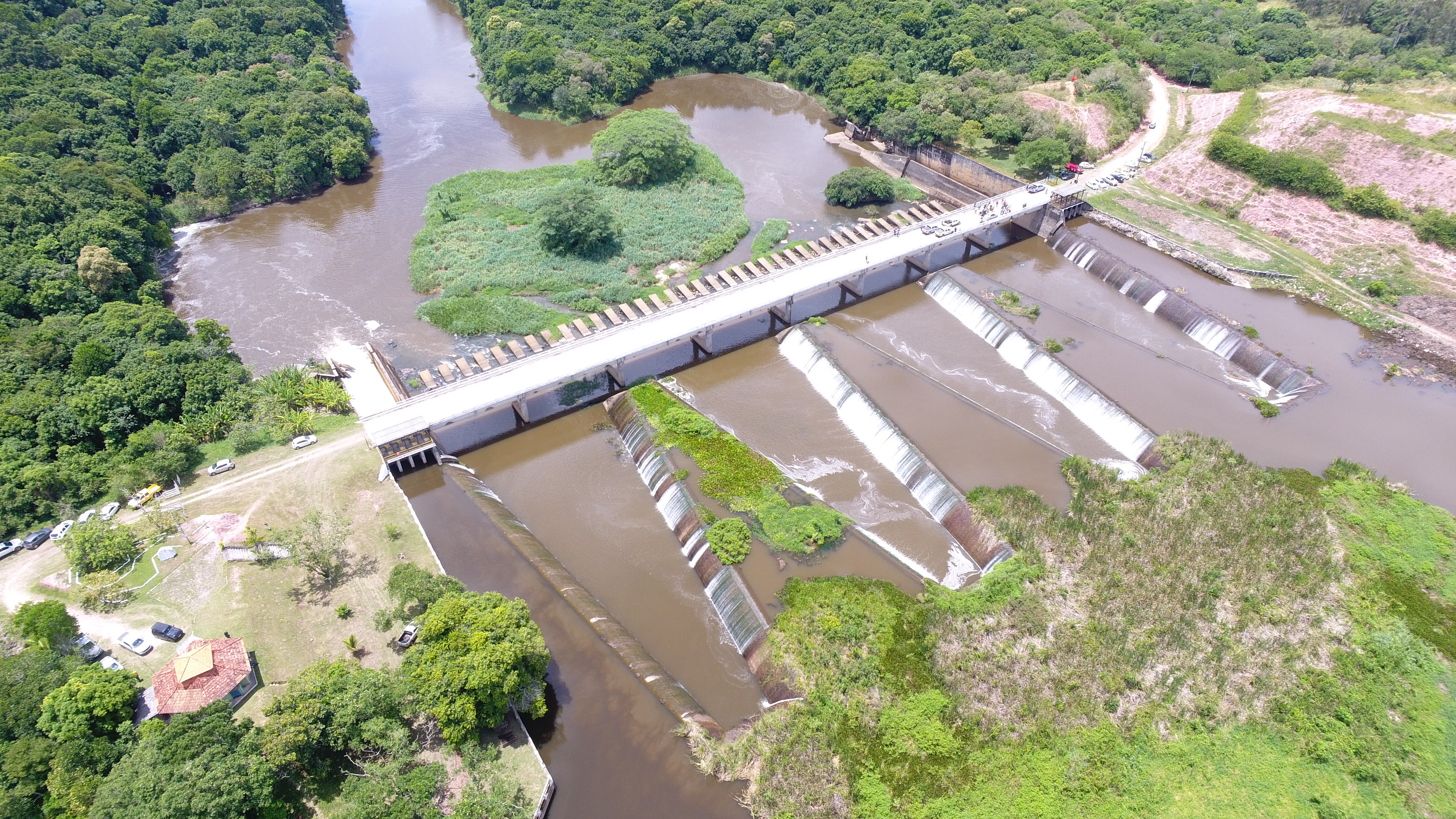
- Lake Juturnaiba

- Location within Brazil
- Interactive map of Lake Juturnaiba
- Location: Rio de Janeiro, Brazil
- Coordinates: 22°36.8′S 42°16.5′W
- Primary inflows: Barra do Rio São João
- Surface elevation: 30 ft (9 m)
- Settlements: Juturnaíba

Lake Juturnaiba (Lagoa de Juturnaíba) is a lake in Rio de Janeiro, Brazil, between the cities of Silva Jardim and Araruama. It is located approximately 60 miles (97 km) from the city of Rio de Janeiro.

== Other reading ==
- Marcelo Coutinho Vargas (2005). O negócio da água: riscos e oportunidades das concessões de saneamento à iniciativa privada: estudos de caso no sudeste brasileiro. pp. 154–55.
