= Pilões, Paraíba =

Coordinates: 6.90194°S 35.6228°W

- Municipality
- Flag Coat of arms

- Country: Brazil
- Region: Northeast
- State: Paraíba
- Mesoregion: Agreste Paraibano

Population (2020)
  - Total: 6,576
- Time zone: UTC−3 (BRT)

Pilões (Central northeastern portuguese pronunciation: [piˈlõjs]) is a municipality in the state of Paraíba in the Northeast Region of Brazil.

== See also ==
- List of municipalities in Paraíba
