= Jaguaribara =

Municipality in Ceará, Brazil

Coordinates: 5°40′S 38°37′W

- Municipality
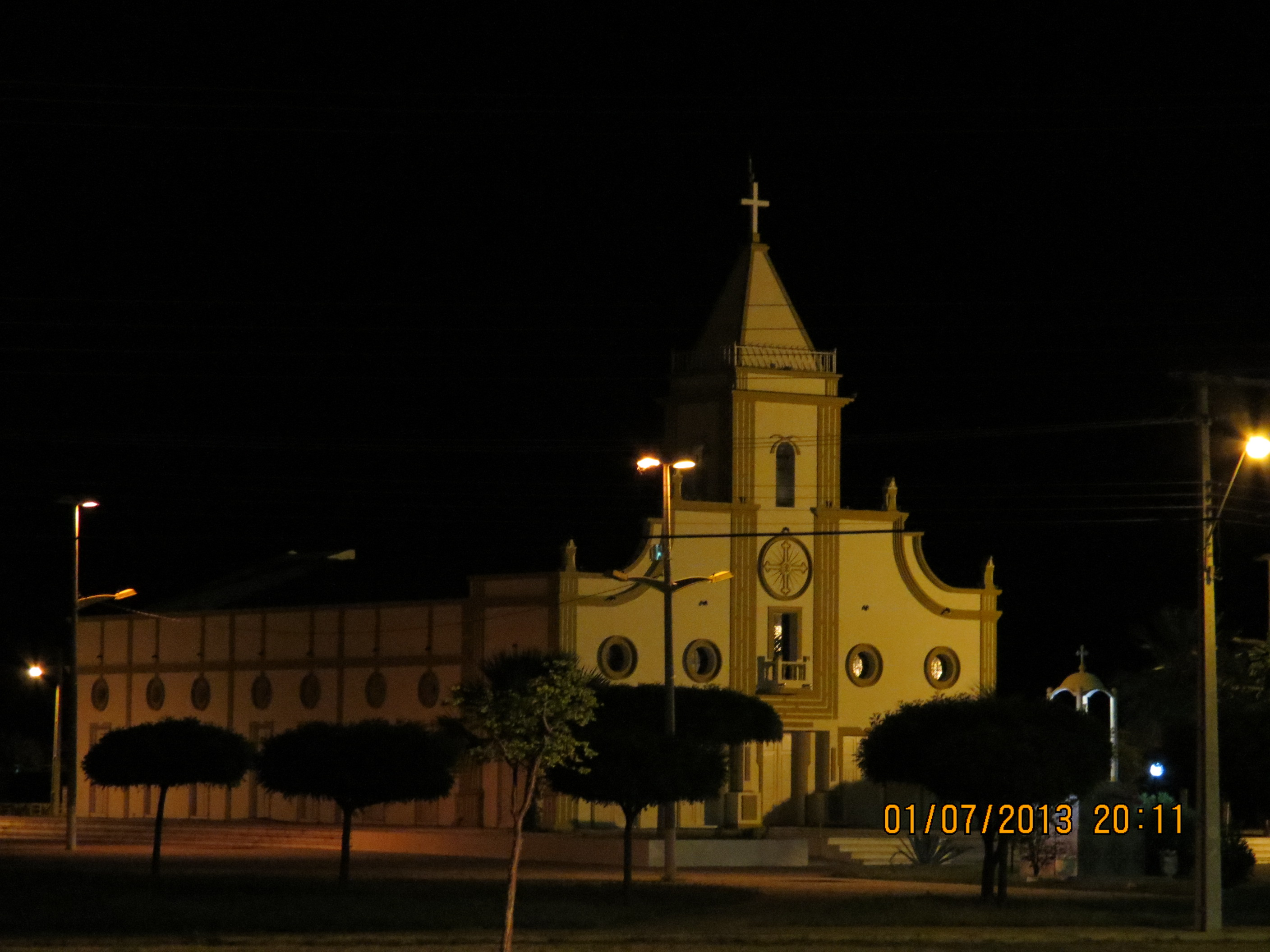

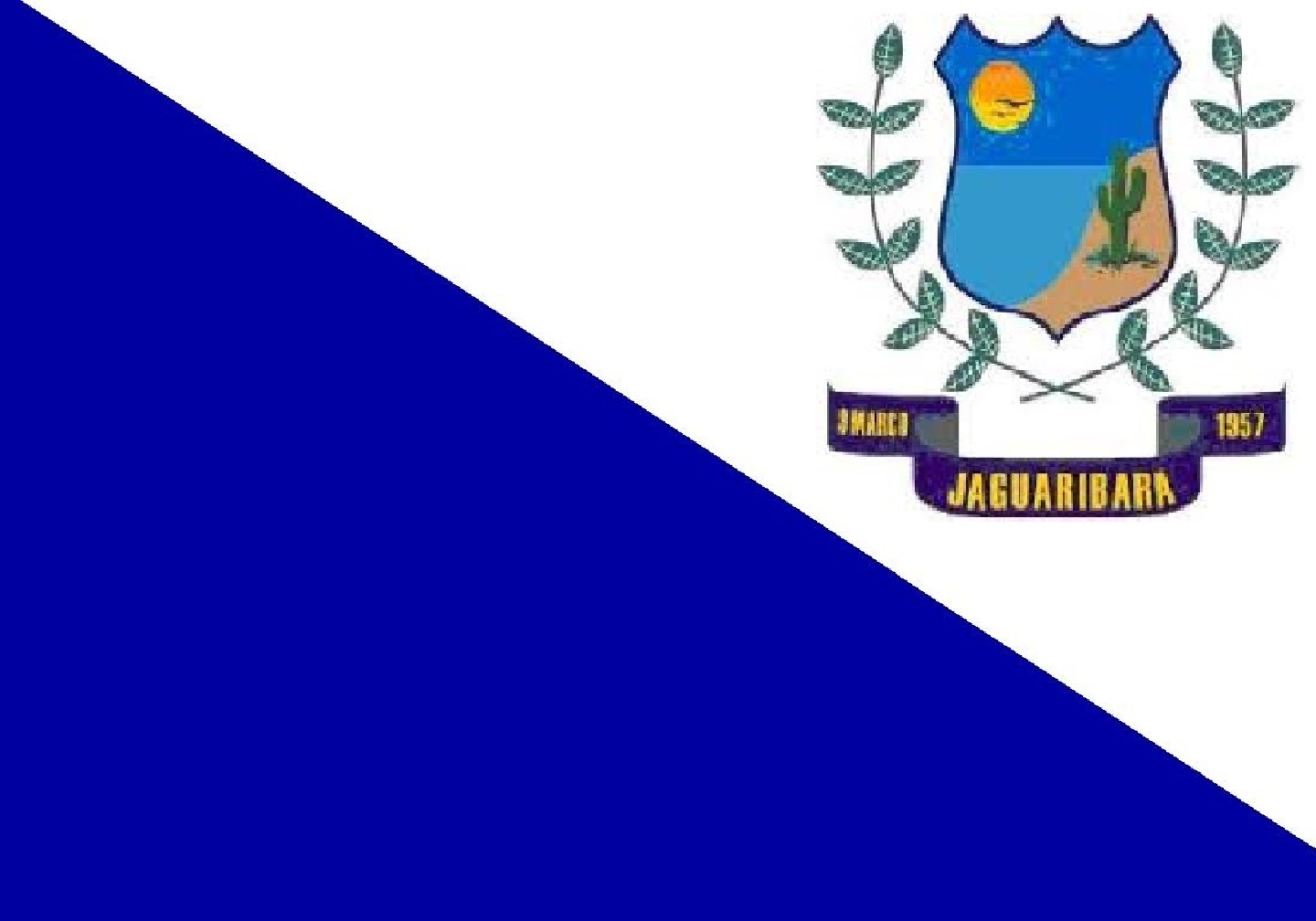
- Flag Coat of arms
- Interactive map of Jaguaribara
- Country: Brazil
- Region: Nordeste
- State: Ceará
- Mesoregion: Jaguaribe

Population (2020)
  - Total: 11,492
- Time zone: UTC−3 (BRT)

Jaguaribara is a municipality in the state of Ceará in the Northeast region of Brazil.

The municipality contains part of the reservoir of the Castanhão Dam, the largest in the state.

== See also ==
- List of municipalities in Ceará
