= Serraria =

Coordinates: 6.82°S 35.6328°W

- Municipality
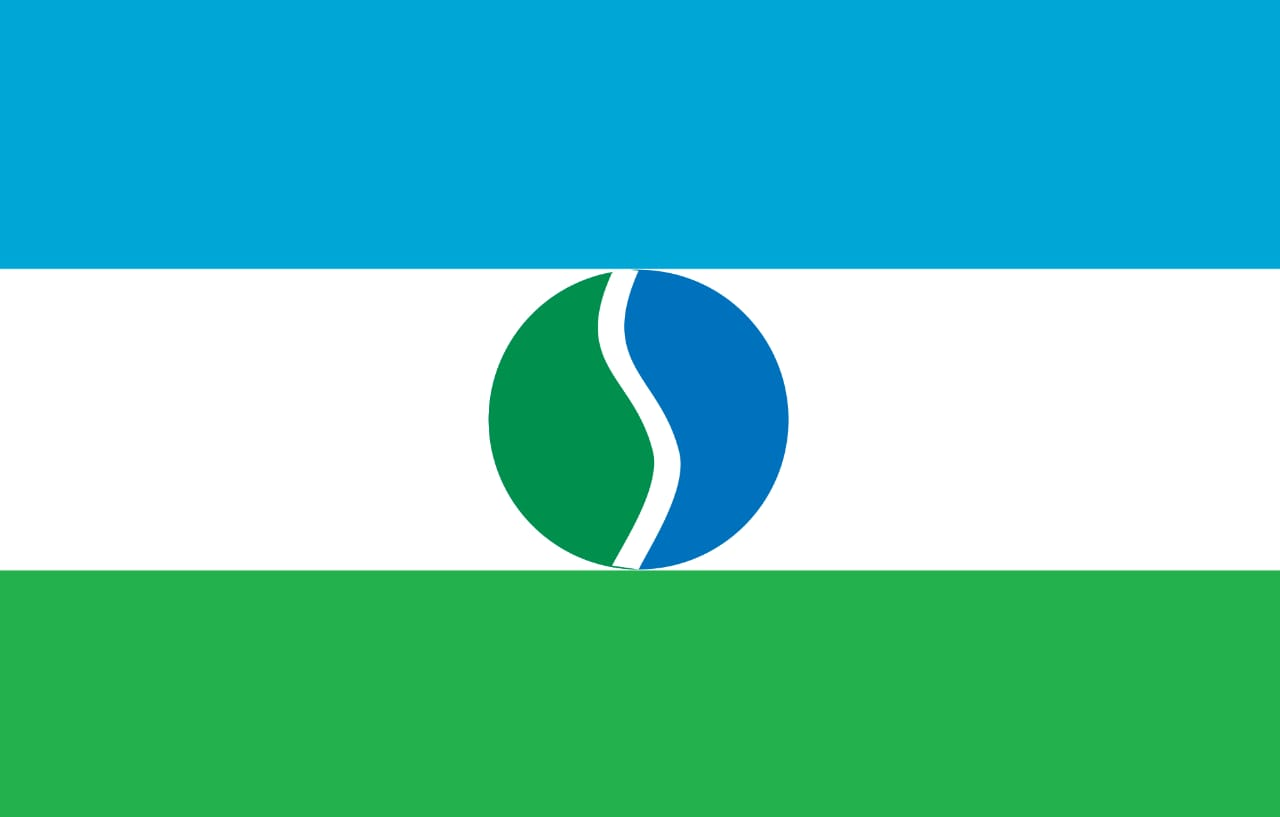
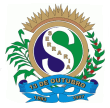
- Flag Coat of arms

- Country: Brazil
- Region: Northeast
- State: Paraíba
- Mesoregion: Agreste Paraibano

Population (2020)
  - Total: 6,068
- Time zone: UTC−3 (BRT)

Serraria (Central northeastern portuguese pronunciation: [sɛhɐˈɾiɐ]) is a municipality in the state of Paraíba in the Northeast Region of Brazil.

== See also ==
- List of municipalities in Paraíba
