= Alto Santo =

Municipality in Ceará, Brazil

Coordinates: 5.52083°S 38.2719°W

- Municipality
- Flag Seal
- Interactive map of Alto Santo
- Country: Brazil
- Region: Nordeste
- State: Ceará
- Mesoregion: Jaguaribe

Population (2020)
  - Total: 17,196
- Time zone: UTC−3 (BRT)

Alto Santo is a municipality in the state of Ceará in the Northeast region of Brazil.

The municipality contains the Castanhão Dam, the largest in the state, and the controversial Arena Coliseu Mateus Aquino.

== See also ==
- List of municipalities in Ceará
