= Banco do Nordeste =

Banco do Nordeste do Brasil S.A.
- Company type: Sociedade Anônima
- Traded as: B3: BNBR3, BNBR4
- Industry: Banking
- Founded: 1952
- Headquarters: Fortaleza, CE, Brazil
- Key people: Marcos Holanda (CEO); Wanger Antônio de Alencar Rocha (president)
- Products: Retail Banking; Development bank
- Revenue: ▲US$ 1.6 billion (2017)
- Net income: ▲US$ 205.6 million (2017)
- Total assets: ▲US$ 16.2 billion (2017)
- Owner: Brazilian Government (90%)
- Number of employees: 6,816
- Website: www.bnb.gov.br

Banco do Nordeste (English: Bank of Northeast) is a Brazilian regional development bank headquartered in Fortaleza, Ceará. The bank was founded in 1952 and today has 300 bank branches and that allied to the work of the Development Agents and Agencies Travelers, allow the Bank to be present in about 2000 cities in all states of the Northeast region of Brazil and in the North region of states of Minas Gerais and Espírito Santo.

The bank is a financial institution organized under the form of mixed economy company, publicly traded, with over 90% of its capital under the control of the Federal Government and is the largest institution in Latin America focused on regional development.

Currently Banco do Nordeste is responsible for managing and implementing the Constitutional Fund for Financing the Northeast of Brazil, with resources of approximately R$15 billion reais.

Banco do Nordeste is responsible for the largest microfinance program in South America and second in Latin America, CrediAmigo, through which the Bank lends money to microentrepreneurs. It also operates the Program for Development of Tourism in the Northeast (Prodetur / NE), created to structure the tourism of the region.

== Management ==
In October 2025, it was reported that Paulo Câmara would step down as president of Banco do Nordeste. Câmara had been appointed to the role in March 2023.

On 21 October 2025, the bank’s Board of Directors elected economist Wanger Antônio de Alencar Rocha as the new president of the institution, replacing Câmara. Rocha assumed the position on an interim basis while continuing to serve as Financial and Credit Director, a role he had held since May 2023.

At the same meeting, the Board elected Raimundo Vandir Farias Júnior as Director of Business, succeeding Luiz Abel Amorim de Andrade, who had been in office since July 2024.

== Controversies ==
In 2014, investigations by Brazilian Federal Court of Accounts (TCU), the Federal Police and the Federal Public Prosecutor’s Office identified irregular lending and capital market operations at Banco do Nordeste during the 2000s. Audits concluded that in numerous cases the bank had extended credit or purchased corporate debentures without adequate guarantees, proper credit analysis, or complete contractual documentation. According to a TCU report, failures in debt recovery procedures and deficient oversight resulted in estimated losses of approximately R$500 million (unadjusted) through 2008.

One of the operations examined involved the purchase of R$110 million in debentures issued by construction firm WTorre following contacts between company representatives and bank officials. Internal reports cited by investigators stated that some transactions were approved without confirmation of tax clearance certificates or sufficient collateral. Similar capital market operations reportedly involved other construction and infrastructure companies, though the firms denied irregularities and stated that obligations had been or were being honored.

Subsequent management changes led to the dissolution of the directorate responsible for several of the questioned operations and to reforms aimed at strengthening credit analysis and debt renegotiation procedures. The bank stated that the transactions were conducted within regulatory parameters and that it ultimately generated profit from them, while former executives denied wrongdoing.

== 2026 cyberattack ==
On 26 January 2026, Banco do Nordeste was the target of a cyberattack affecting its PIX instant payment infrastructure. According to reports, the intrusion occurred through a vulnerability identified by criminals in a third-party service provider connected to the bank's systems. The attack involved fraudulent transactions executed through a so-called "conta-bolsão" (pooled account) maintained by the service provider.

The bank stated in a filing with Brazil’s Securities and Exchange Commission (CVM) that no customer accounts were compromised and no data leak was identified. Following the incident, Banco do Nordeste temporarily suspended its PIX operations while technical teams worked in coordination with the Central Bank of Brazil to assess the scope of the breach and restore services securely.
