= Parangaba =

Neighborhood in Fortaleza, Brazil

Coordinates: 3.776648°S 38.565783°W

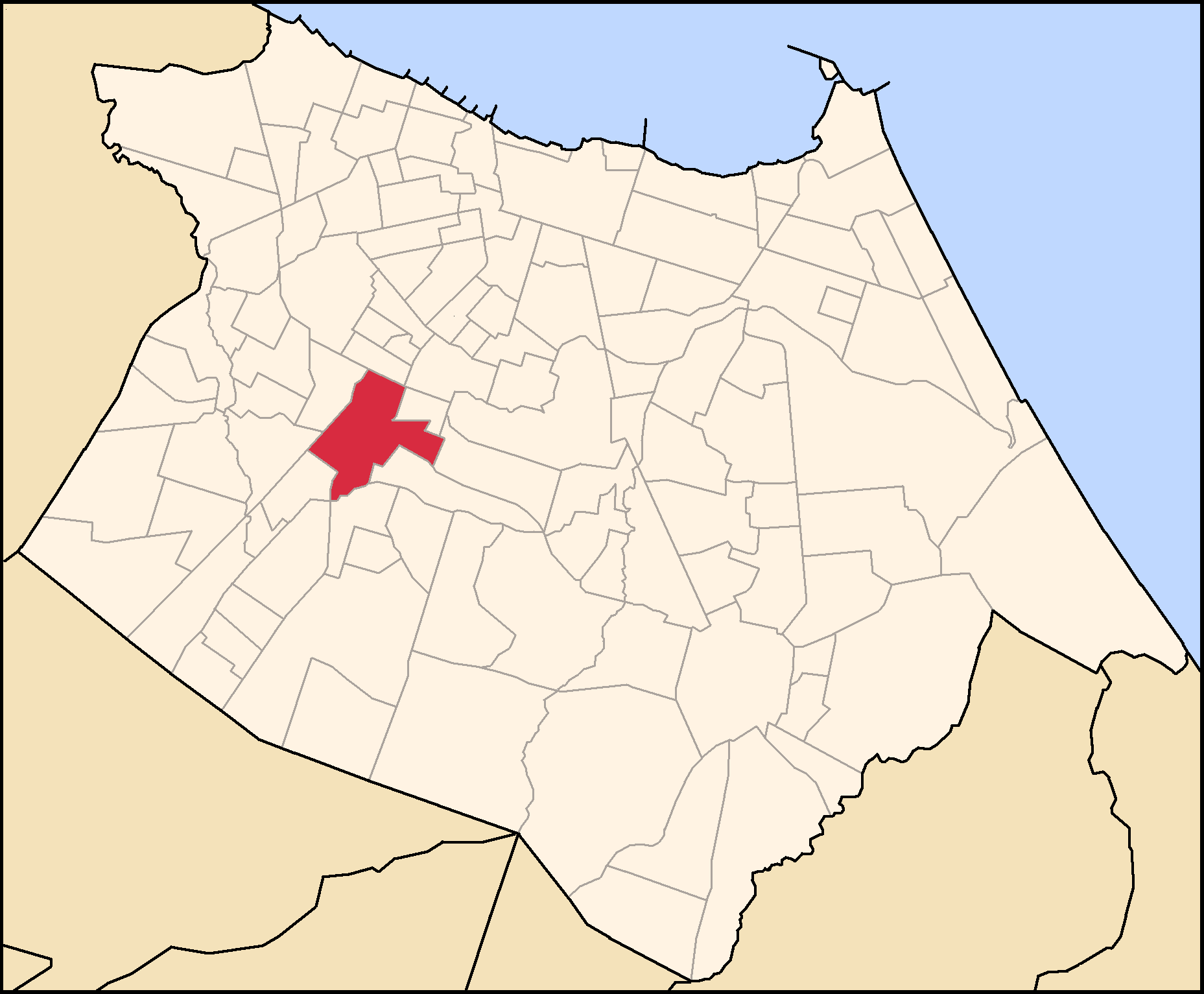
Map of Fortaleza with Parangaba

Parangaba Portuguese pronunciation: [paɾɐ̃'gabɐ] is a neighborhood of Fortaleza in Ceará, Brazil. It was an independent city, but Fortaleza developed, expanded and Parangaba has become to a part of that city. There is a lake with the same name and since 1993 a big famous flea market, called "Feira dos Pássaros", which means "Bird Market", in a free translation.
