= Pires Ferreira =

Municipality in Ceará, Brazil

Coordinates: 4°15′S 40°38′W

- Municipality
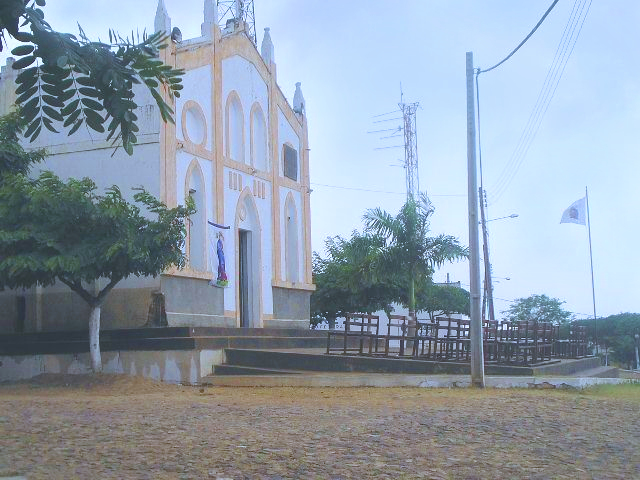
- Interactive map of Pires Ferreira
- Country: Brazil
- Region: Nordeste
- State: Ceará
- Mesoregion: Noroeste Cearense

Population (2020)
  - Total: 11,001
- Time zone: UTC−3 (BRT)

Pires Ferreira is a municipality in the state of Ceará in the Northeast region of Brazil.

== See also ==
- List of municipalities in Ceará
