= Orós =

Municipality in Ceará, Brazil

Coordinates: 6.24389°S 38.9139°W

- Municipality
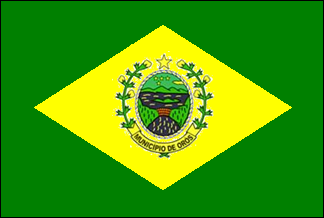
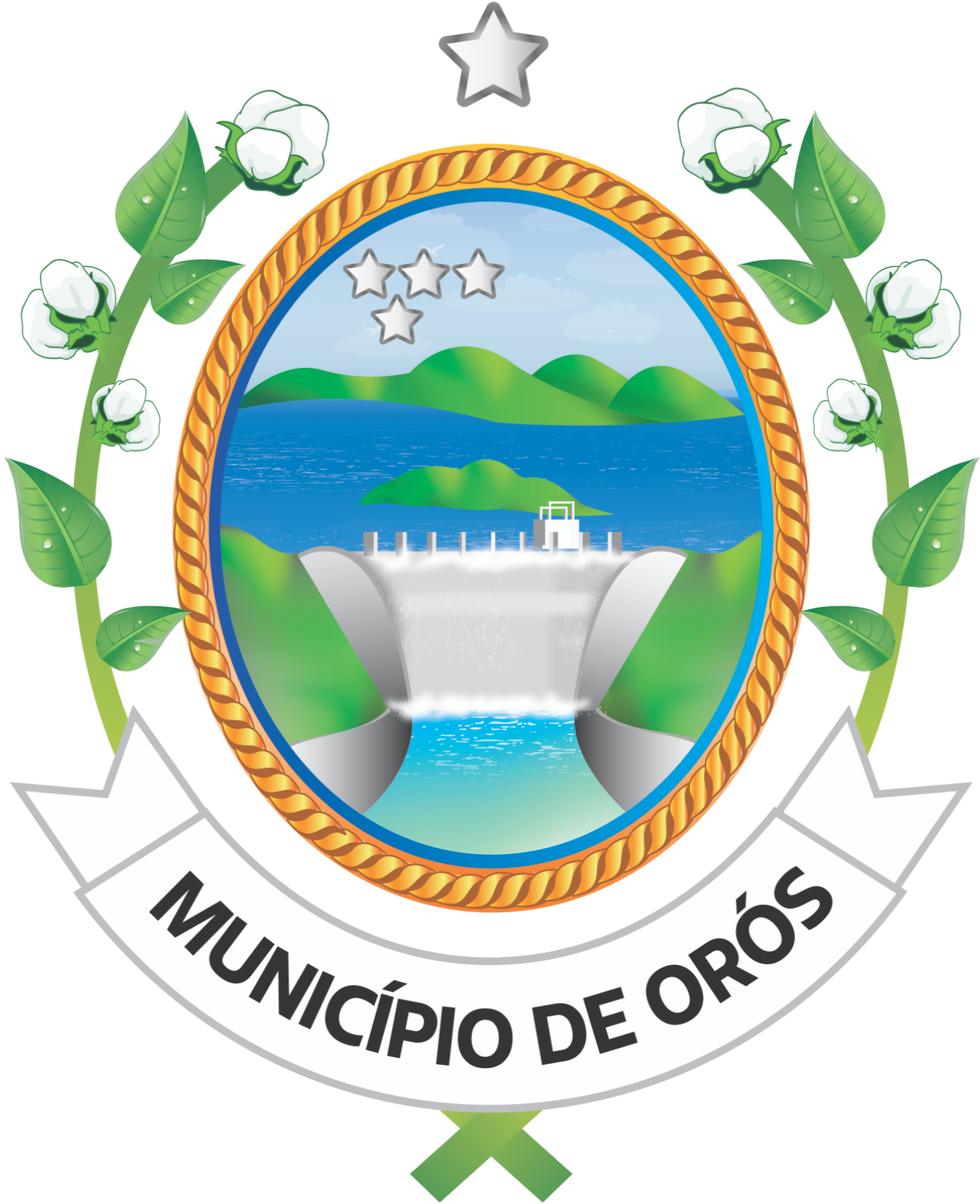
- Flag Coat of arms
- Interactive map of Orós
- Country: Brazil
- Region: Nordeste
- State: Ceará
- Mesoregion: Centro-Sul Cearense

Population (2020)
  - Total: 21,384
- Time zone: UTC−3 (BRT)

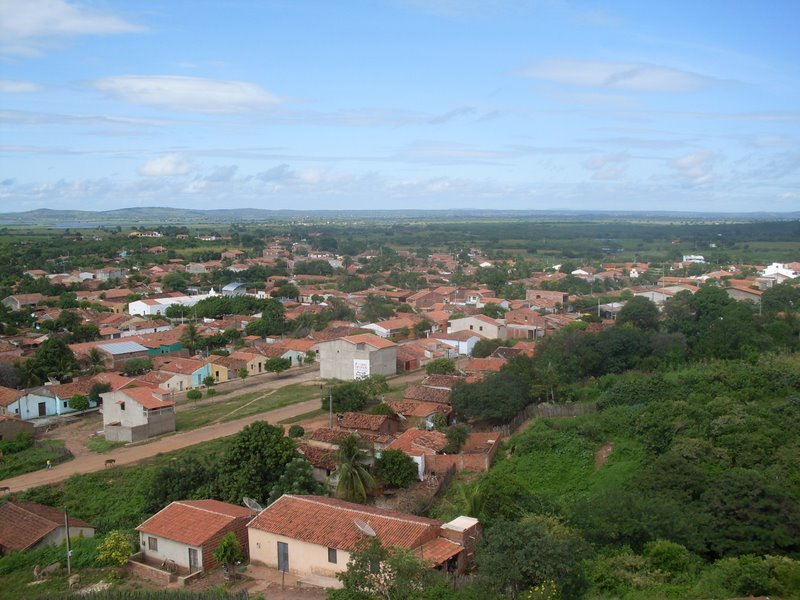

Orós is a municipality in the state of Ceará in the Northeast region of Brazil. Its largest district is Guassussê.

== See also ==
- List of municipalities in Ceará
- Orós Dam
