= Castanhão Dam =

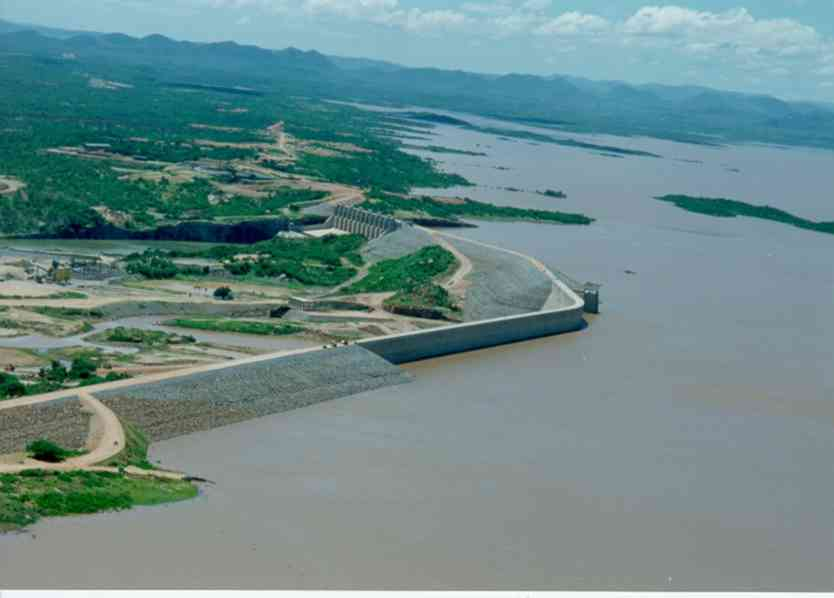
- View of the dam

- Location within Brazil
- Official name: Açude Público Padre Cicero
- Country: Brazil
- Location: Jaguaribara, Ceará
- Coordinates: 5.4975°S 38.446944°W
- Purpose: Water reservoir
- Status: Active
- Construction began: 1995
- Opening date: 29 January 2004

Dam and spillways
- Impounds: Jaguaribe River
- Height (thalweg): 111 metres (364 ft)

Reservoir
- Total capacity: 6,700,000,000 cubic metres (2.4×10^{11} cu ft)
- Inactive capacity: 250,000,000 cubic metres (8.8×10^{9} cu ft)
- Surface area: 36,000 hectares (89,000 acres)

The Castanhão Dam (Portuguese: Açude Castanhão) is a dam in the state of Ceará, Brazil. It is the largest multiple use reservoir in the country, the largest on an intermittent river, and the main reservoir for the state and the metropolitan region of Fortaleza. The dam supplies drinking water, and supports industry, irrigation and fish farming. Through steady release of water the dam maintains water flow in the Jaguaribe River throughout the year. During 2012–16 Ceará experienced a prolonged drought. Water levels in the reservoir dropped to 5% of capacity and usage had to be rationed.

== Technical ==
The Castanhão dam is in the municipality of Alto Santo, Ceará. The reservoir covers parts of the municipalities of Alto Santo, Jaguaribara, Jaguaribe and Jaguaretama. The dam is 307 kilometres (191 mi) from the state capital of Fortaleza. It is the largest multiple-use public reservoir in Brazil and the largest dam in Brazil on an intermittent river.

The reservoir has 6,700,000,000 cubic metres (2.4×10^{11} cu ft) capacity, of which 250,000,000 cubic metres (8.8×10^{9} cu ft) is dead volume. The reservoir covers 325 square kilometres (125 sq mi), and extends for 58 kilometres (36 mi) from southwest to northeast along the Jaguaribe River. In places it is more than 50 metres (160 ft) deep. The main dam is 1,500 metres (4,900 ft) long and 11 metres (36 ft) wide, with 12 floodgates and four dispersing valves. The spillway is 106 metres (348 ft) and the crown quota is 111 metres (364 ft). The dam includes a hydroelectric power plant with a capacity of 22.5 MW.

The Orós Dam, further upstream on the Jaguaribe, provides 2.5 cubic metres (88 cu ft) per second, while the Castanhão supplies 15 cubic metres (530 cu ft) per second. Of this 9.5 cubic metres (340 cu ft) per second goes via the Eixão das Águas to the metropolitan region and 5.5 cubic metres (190 cu ft) per second goes into the Jaguaribe River, which the dam keeps flowing to Itaiçaba all year. From Itaiçaba the water follows the Canal do Trabalhador to the state capital.

== Construction ==
The Jaguaribe River used to be called the largest seasonal river in the world. The river basin cover about 75,669 square kilometres (29,216 sq mi), over half the area of the state. The 633 kilometres (393 mi) river is the largest in Ceará. Before the dam was built the Orós Dam on the Jaguaribe River was the largest in the state, but it has just over half the capacity of the Castanhão. The idea of building the Castanhão Dam came from the Cunha family, who led the region's oligarchy at the time. They owned the Castanhão farm, which is now almost completely submerged by the reservoir.

The Castanhão Dam was one of the most important projects of DNOCS (National Department of Drought Works). Work was started in 1995 under the government of Tasso Jereissati. Construction was done by a partnership between DNOCS and the Ceará Secretariat of Water Resources. It was concluded on 23 December 2002 under governor Beni Veras. The dam was officially opened on 29 January 2004. The 12 floodgates were releasing 300 cubic metres (11,000 cu ft) per second. The reservoir reached 97% of its capacity in the 2009 rainy season, covering 36,000 hectares (89,000 acres).

== Impact ==
The dam was controversial, forcing relocation of thousands of people and relocation of the municipal seat of Jaguaribara. The Castanhão Ecological Station was created in compensation for the environmental impact. The municipal seat of Jaguaribara and large areas of the municipality were covered by the reservoir. A new seat, Nova Jaguaribara, was built, but as of 2016 there were still outstanding claims for indemnification of lost land.

The giant dam supplies water to the Metropolitan Region of Fortaleza and supports irrigation and the industries of Pecém. It supplies about 3.8 million people in greater Fortaleza. The reservoir has 37% of the state's water storage capacity. It controls the level of the Jaguaribe River, preventing floods and ensuring a constant flow year round. The dam supports irrigation of 43,000 hectares (110,000 acres) of land. The reservoir is a tourist attraction. With its submerged city, it is of great interest to divers.

== 2012–18 drought ==
From 2012 to 2016 Ceará experienced the worst drought since 1910, with just 516 millimetres (20.3 in) of rain. At the end of 2012, the first year of low rainfall, the reservoir had 3,725,880 cubic metres (131,578,000 cu ft), or 55.61% of its capacity. By February 2016 the dam was releasing just 5 cubic metres (180 cu ft) per second, but water levels were dropping 1 centimetre (0.39 in) per day due to evaporation and consumption. By mid-2016, following low rainfall and high consumption, the reservoir was down to just over 550,000 cubic metres (19,000,000 cu ft). Fish farmers said they could only continue farming tilapia until the end of the year.

The low water levels in 2014 revealed a crack in the structure of one of the floodgates. As of mid-2016 nothing had been done to repair it. By December 2016 the reservoir had fallen to 5.17% of capacity, the lowest level since the reservoir filled in 2004. As of 14 January 2017 the rains from the start of the rainy season had not yet started to replenish the reservoir, which was at 4.99% of total capacity. As of 22 February 2018 the reservoir was at 2,08 %. Rain returned in Ceará in February 2018 and on 13 May Castanhão has reached 8,68 % of its capacity. But on 4 October it was down again - 6,06 % only.
