= Salvation Policy =

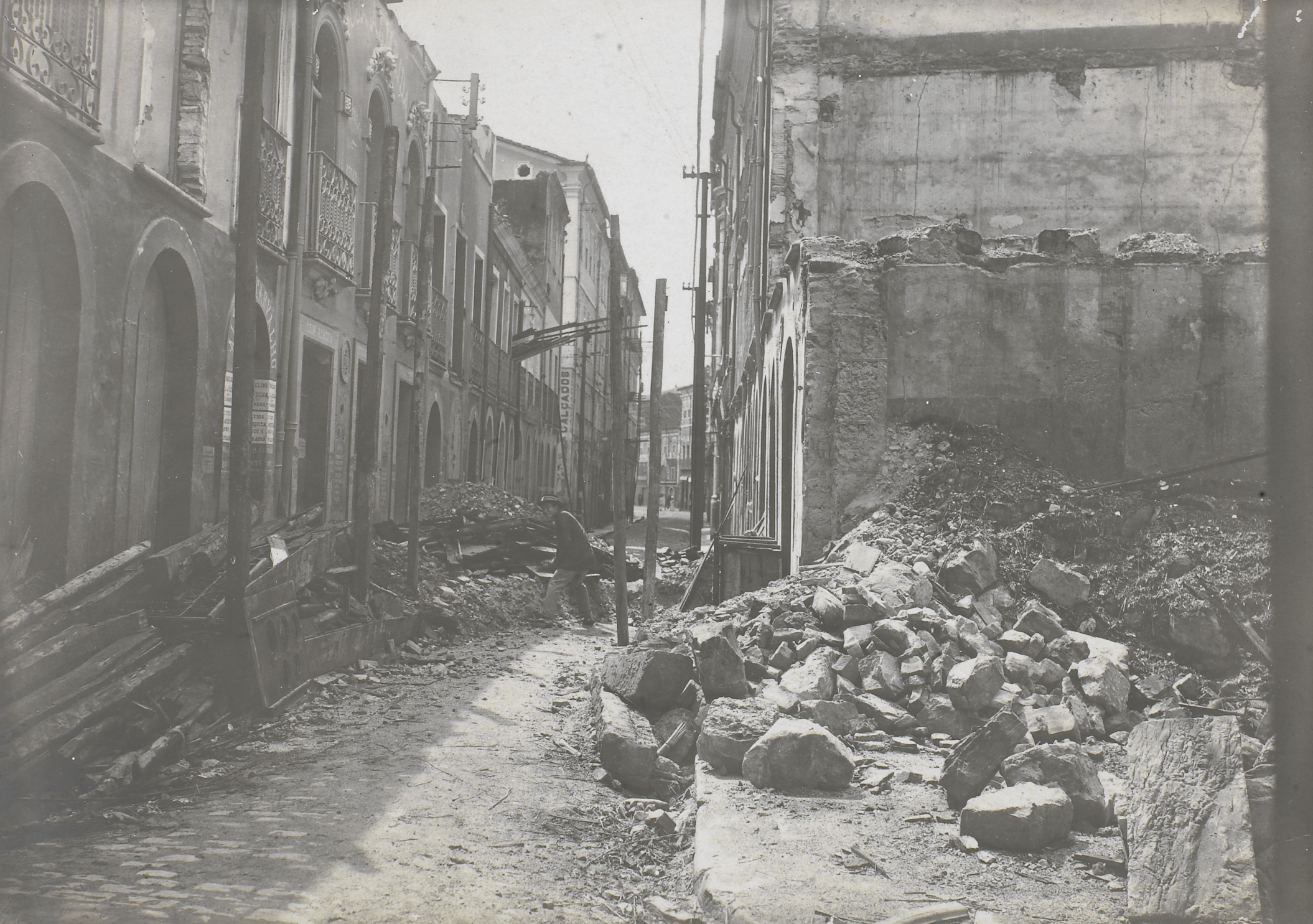
A street in Salvador following a bombardment by the Federal Government during the Salvation Policy.

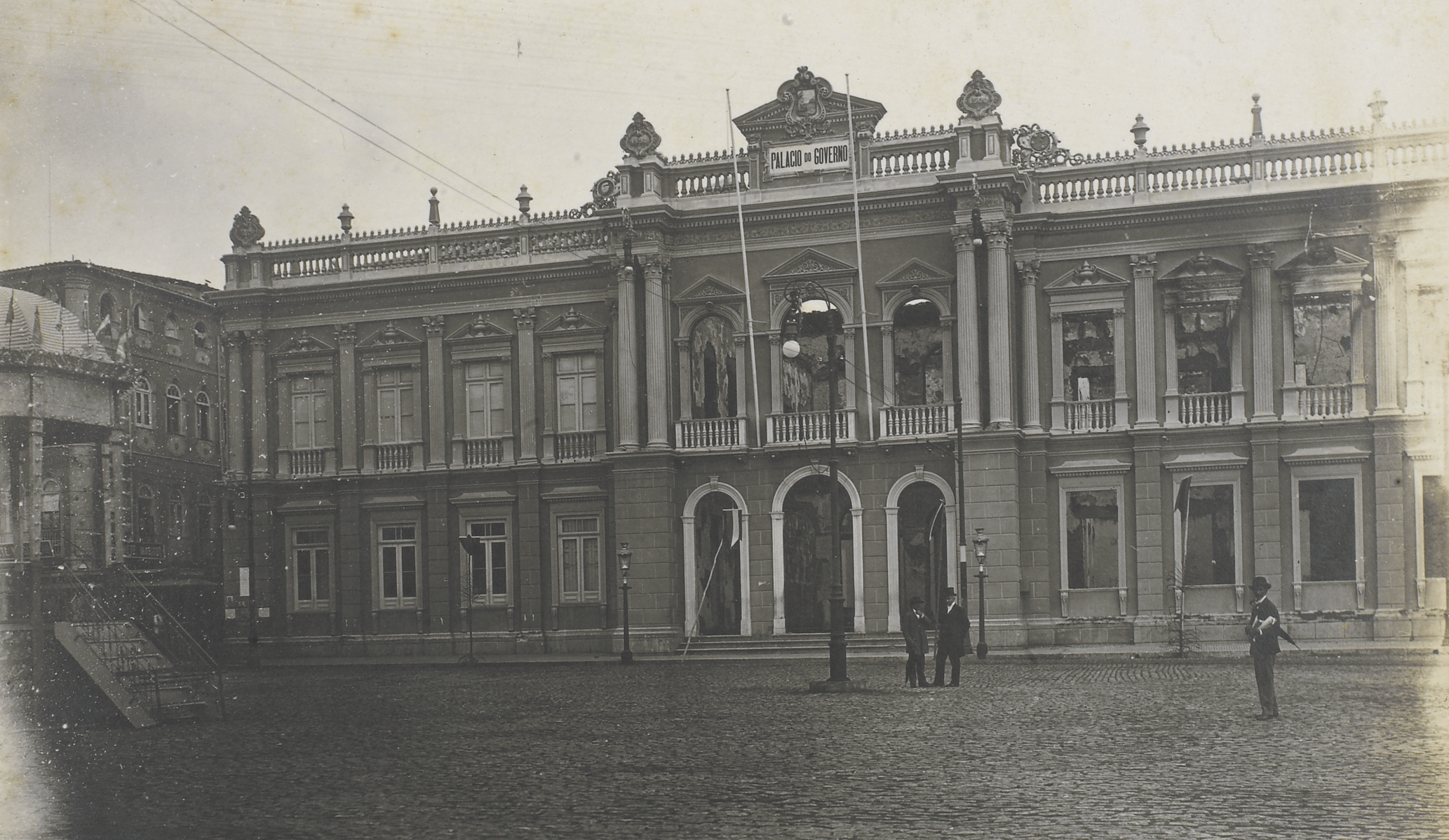
Bahia Government Palace, following the bombardment by the Federal Government during the Salvation Policy, 1912. Arquivo Nacional

The Salvation Policy, also known as Initial Salvations, was implemented by Hermes da Fonseca, originally in opposition to the "Civilist Campaign." It consisted of promoting military interventions. It was to begin in São Paulo, an attempt that failed, in order to weaken the coffee growers. Following the failure in São Paulo, General Dantas Barreto assumed the government of Pernambuco. These coups were repeated in Ceará and Alagoas. The government believed that, in this way, it would bring morality to the country.

The government installed military intervenors or civilians backed by the Army, to replace the dominant oligarchies. However, the success of the interventions shook the foundations of the pro-government camp, ultimately weakening Hermes da Fonseca. The "salvation policy" merely replaced the power of old oligarchies with that of others, and the original project of "moralizing political conduct and reducing social inequalities" was not realized.

Furthermore, the policy did not work in some regions due to resistance from the population. The most famous case occurred in Ceará, where the priest Cícero Romão Batista, interested in forging alliances with powerful landowners, blocked the actions, turning the people against the government.
