= Padre Ibiapina =

Brazilian priest and preacher

Venerable José Antônio de Maria Ibiapina
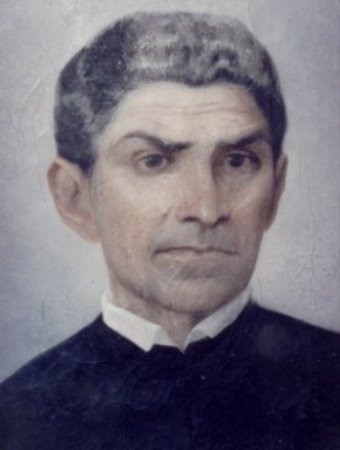
- Church: Roman Catholic Church
- Diocese: Archdiocese of Olinda e Recife

Orders
- Ordination: July 3 1853 by João da Purificação Marques Perdigão
- Rank: Presbyter

Personal details
- Born: José Antônio Pereira; August 5 1806 Sobral
- Died: February 19 1883 Solânea
- Profession: Lawyer, professor
- Education: Faculty of Law of Olinda

José Antônio de Maria Ibiapina (August 5, 1806 – February 19, 1883), widely known as Padre Ibiapina, was a Brazilian lawyer, judge, professor, and politician who abandoned his civil career to become a Catholic priest and preach through the interior of Northeastern Brazil.

He helped establish hospitals, schools, churches, cemeteries, and charity houses across Paraíba, Ceará, Pernambuco, Rio Grande do Norte, and Piauí. On March 31 2025, Pope Francis declared him venerable.

== Biography ==
=== Early life ===
Born José Antônio Pereira in Sobral at the time of colonial Brazil, he was the son of the politician and scrivener Francisco Miguel Pereira, a republican revolutionary executed for his involvement in the Confederation of the Equator, and Teresa Maria de Jesus, a housewife from a traditional family of Sobral. The surname ''Ibiapina'', a reference to the Serra da Ibiapaba, was adopted by Pereira as a nom de guerre and passed down to his children. Growing up in a sertão environment plagued by poverty, he attended small private schools in Icó before moving to Jardim, where he completed his humanities education, studying Latin under Joaquim Teotônio Sobreira de Melo.

At the age of seventeen, he joined the Seminary of Olinda, but following the death of his mother in childbirth in 1824 and his father's trial in 1825, Ibiapina had to interrupt his studies to care for his four younger siblings. In 1828, he enrolled in the first cohort of the Faculty of Law of Olinda, where his contemporaries included Eusébio de Queiroz and Conselheiro Aguiar, and from which he graduated in October 1832. After his final exams, he was appointed adjunct professor of natural law at the Faculty. Among his students were João Maurício Vanderlei, Baron of Cotegipe, Zacarias de Góis e Vasconcelos, and the future governor of Bahia Álvaro Tibério de Moncorvo Lima.

=== Career ===
In December 1833, he learned that he had been appointed a judge and took office in 1834, serving until early 1835. In 1833, he was elected general deputy for the province of Ceará, and served in Rio de Janeiro until 1837 as a representative of the Liberal Party. During his mandate, he proposed a bill criminalizing the arrival of enslaved African people to Brazil, which was not approved. Disillusioned with politics, he began working as a lawyer in the old town of Vila Real do Brejo de Areia, where he successfully defended a man facing the death penalty. He inaugurated his own office in Recife in 1840 and practiced for nearly a decade.

In 1850, having bought land in the vicinities of Recife, he abandoned his law career and spent three years on a farm, devoting himself to spiritual life, reading, and treating his asthma. He then decided to sell his possessions and become a priest. He was ordained on July 3 1853, and began teaching sacred oratory and biblical history at the Seminary of Olinda. As a cholera epidemic ravaged the region, Ibiapina decided to become a missionary, and changed his surname from Pereira to Maria.

=== Missions ===
In December 1855, he traveled through Paraíba, visiting Campina Grande, Pilar, Ingá, and the former settlement of Santa Fé, where he founded a charity house and helped erect a shrine. In Gravatá do Jaburu, he organized the construction of a small hospital for cholera patients. From 1860 to 1864, he pilgrimed in the region of Cariri-Velho through villages and towns, bringing together numerous people in collective efforts (mutirões) to build water dams, schools, chapels, orphanages, and hospitals. From 1865 to 1870, as his fame in the sertão grew, he worked in the regions of Missão Velha, Pocinhos, Bezerros, and Milagres, and from 1870 to 1872, he was active in the state of Piauí. He last traveled to Triunfo in 1876 before settling in the charity house of Santa Fé, where he died in 1883.

Ibiapina left very few writings, and his preaching is scarcely documented, as his audiences consisted mostly of illiterate people. His works include sermons, one travel account, and letters in which he offers spiritual orientations to lay sisters.

== Legacy ==
He was known as the ''Apostle of the Northeast''. His preaching oriented to social and community work distincted him from previous missionaries, such as the Italian capuchinhos. He inspired both Padre Cícero and Antônio Conselheiro.
