= Orós Dam =

Barragem Presidente Juscelino Kubitschek de Oliveira
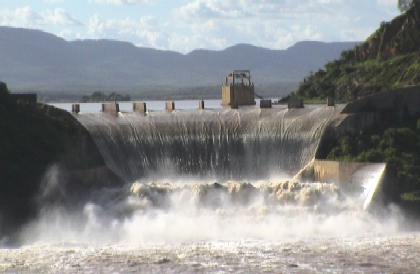
- Interactive map of Barragem Presidente Juscelino Kubitschek de Oliveira
- Location: Orós, Ceará, Brazil
- Coordinates: 6°14′20″S 38°55′30″W
- Opening date: 1961

Dam and spillways
- Impounds: Jaguaribe River

Reservoir
- Total capacity: 2.1b m^{3}

The Orós Dam or President Juscelino Kubitschek Dam (Portuguese: Barragem Presidente Juscelino Kubitschek de Oliveira) is located on the Jaguaribe River, in the northeastern Brazilian state of Ceará.

It has a capacity of 2.1 billion cubic metres (74 billion cubic feet), making it the second largest reservoir in the state. Completed in 1961, it was the largest dam in Ceará until the completion of the Castanhão Dam in 2003.

== See also ==
- Orós (municipality)
