= Federal Institute of Education, Science and Technology of Ceará =

Public university in Ceará Brazil

- Instituto Federal de Educação, Ciência e Tecnologia do Ceará
- Former names: Schools of Apprentice Artisans, Industrial Lyceum of Fortaleza, Industrial School of Fortaleza, Technical School of Ceará, Federal Center for Technological Education
- Type: Public university
- Established: December 29, 2008
- Budget: R$788,616,177,00.00 (2023)
- Rector: José Wally Mendonça Menezes
- Academic staff: 2,107 (2023)
- Administrative staff: 1,614 (2023)
- Total staff: 3,323 (2023)
- Students: 33,355 (2023)
- Undergraduates: 16,591 (2023)
- Postgraduates: 1,015 (2023)
- Other students: 15,749 (2023)
- Location: Fortaleza, Ceará, Brazil; 3°44′39″S 38°32′10″W
- Campus: Multiple sites
- Website: ifce.edu.br
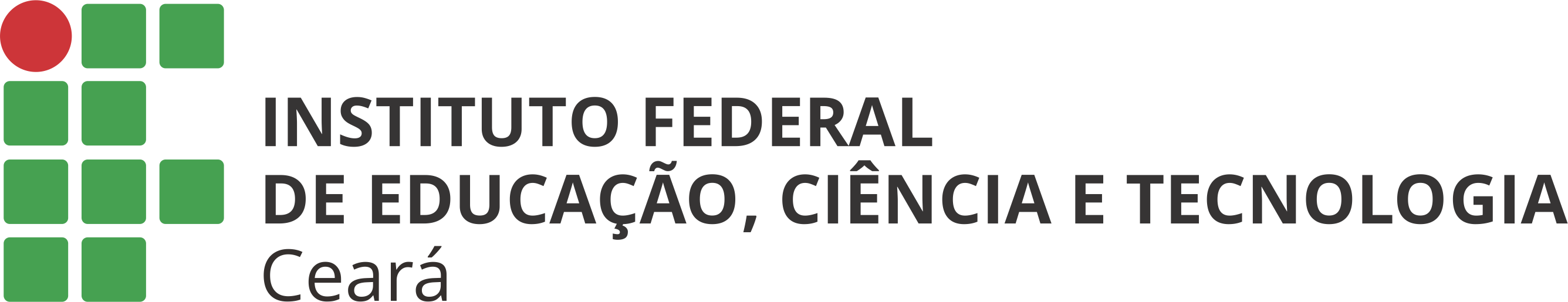

- Location within Brazil

The Federal Institute of Education, Science, and Technology of Ceará (IFCE) (Note: Instituto Federal de Educação, Ciência e Tecnologia do Ceará) is a Federal Institute of higher, basic, and professional education, pluricurricular and multicampus, operating in Ceará, Brazil. Specialized in offering professional and technological education in the different teaching modalities, IFCE is based on the conjugation of technical and technological knowledge with pedagogical practice and operates in all regions of the state through its 32 campuses, serving more than 33,000 students in a total installed area of over 5.9 million m^{2}.

IFCE's General Index of Courses (IGC) (Note: Índice Geral de Cursos) in 2017 reached 3, and the Institutional Concept in 2018 was 5. Recent evaluations by the Ministry of Education (MEC) (Note: Ministério da Educação) point to an elevation in the indicators of the Higher Education Evaluation National System (Sinaes), (Note: Sistema Nacional de Avaliação da Educação Superior) such as course evaluations, institutional evaluations, and the National Student Performance Exam (Enade). (Note: Exame Nacional de Desempenho de Estudantes) Recent evaluations have resulted in 4 and 5 grades in courses and a 5 grade (the maximum grade) for the Sobral Campus, as a campus of excellence for IFCE. In 2009, the institute was listed in the National High School Exam (ENEM) (Note: Exame Nacional do Ensino Médio) as the best in Ceará, at position 148 in Brazil. IFCE is the first public institution to send a participant to the world stage of the International Young Physicists' Tournament in 2021 in Georgia.

The institution is also one of those that is part of the Brazilian Company for Industrial Research and Innovation (EMBRAPII), (Note: Empresa Brasileira de Pesquisa e Inovação Industrial) with an innovation hub that has already applied more than R$22 million in research investments in 50 contracts and has more than 340 students and about 70 researchers participating in these projects.

The IFCE is the successor of the legacy that trained students who helped transform society in many aspects, highlighting some famous ones like physicist Cláudio Lenz Cesar, singer Falcão, journalist Flávio Paiva, writer Lira Neto, actor Jesuíta Barbosa, and politician and former senator Inácio Arruda.

== History ==
=== From "School of Apprentices" to "Federal Center" ===
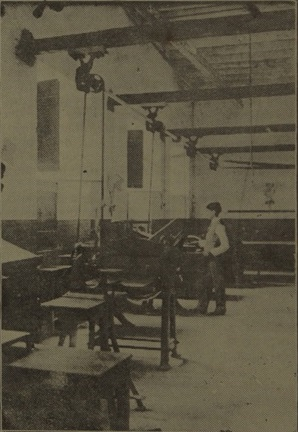
Typography and bookbinding workshop in 1915

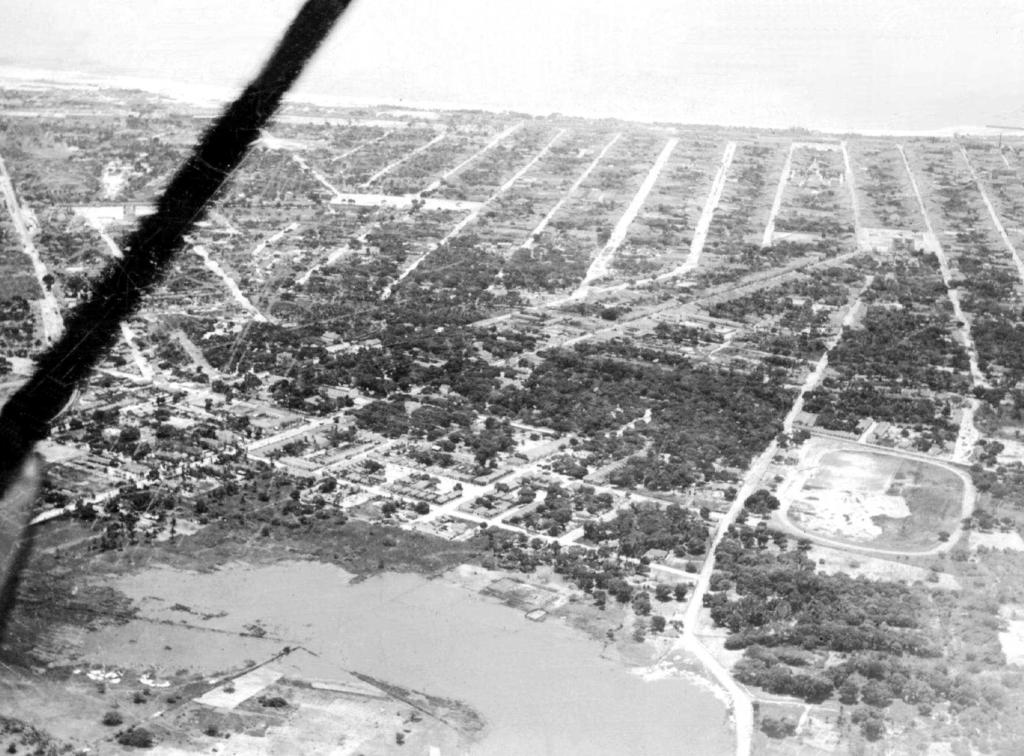
Aerial view of Campo do Prado Stadium where the Industrial School of Fortaleza building was built.

In 1909, President Nilo Peçanha authorized the creation of the Schools of Apprentice Artisans (Escolas de Aprendizes Artífices – EAA), having initiated its activities in a building where the School of Apprentice-Mariners of Ceará (EAMCE) (Note: Escola de Aprendizes–Marinheiros do Ceará) was inaugurated on May 25, 1910, with the presence of governor Nogueira Acioly, in Iracema Beach.

At the inauguration only the typography workshop functioned. The following year, in 1911, the shoemaking and tailoring workshops began to function and finally the carpentry and woodworking, metalworking, and mechanics workshops in 1912. The School of Artisans participated in 1911 in the Turin International held in Turin, Italy and obtained gold and silver medals with several artifacts carried by the students, as well as honorable mention.

The government of Ceará made a change with the EAA, transferring the school in 1914 to a building next to the José de Alencar Theater. During the initial years the operation was precarious, so much so that the workshops weren't working with engines, and the installations were functioning all with manual machines. Only in 1915 there was the inauguration of engines and other electric machines.

At this time the School of Apprentices began publishing the Revista Pedagógica (Pedagogical Magazine) in 1917, in which teaching topics that involved the institution's activities were presented and discussed. The list of the first graduates of the Ceará School of Apprentice Artisans is very short, and in 1922 only 13 students had finished the courses in a period of 12 years of activities of the school, between 1910 and 1921. Such a situation stemmed from the difficulty of the students, most of whom were poor and needed to work to survive. In 1931 the Schools of Mariners were extinguished, and so in Ceará, the School of Artisans came to occupy the premises, in the Jacarecanga neighborhood, between 1932 and 1939.

The transformation into an "Industrial Lyceum" took place during Carlos Câmara's administration, in 1937. At that time, Câmara articulated with the government of Ceará the feasibility of the institution's own headquarters, through the donation of the former Campo do Prado Stadium in Fortaleza. This land donation took place through Decree No. 548 of May 4, 1939. Due to Brazil's entry into World War II, the site was used as shelter and preparation for the Rubber soldiers of the Special Service of Workers' Mobilization for the Amazon (SEMTA), (Note: Serviço Especial de Mobilização de Trabalhadores para a Amazônia) until 1945. In 1939 Waldyr Diogo de Siqueira was appointed director, and the following year, 1940, the high school was transferred to a building of the Ceará Transportation Network in the Centro neighborhood in Fortaleza.

The MEC changed the name from "Lyceum" to "School" in 1942. Siqueira was the director who accompanied the construction of the new headquarters, but it was Jorge Raupp who inaugurated, in 1952, the project by architect Emílio Hinko. The institution had, at the time, a structure to "attend 800 students, counting with classrooms, workshops, dormitories, gymnasium, tennis court and swimming pool".

Raupp was sworn in as director in 1951 and already in that year he got a training in the area of industrial education at a United States cooperation program in New York. Technical education underwent changes in 1959, already with a minimum age of 14 years and transforming the schools into autarchies. In 1961 with the first Law of Directives and Bases of National Education (LDB), (Note: Lei de Diretrizes e Bases da Educação Nacional) professional education was established and it was at this time that the first technical courses integrated to high school emerged, which trained the road and building technicians in 1962.

In the late 1960s the military government made an agreement with the World Bank that modernized the Federal Technical Schools (ETF), (Note: Escolas Técnicas Federais) with the one in Ceará receiving several pieces of machinery imported from countries such as Germany, Switzerland, France, the United States and Czechoslovakia.

The transition from "Industrial School" to "Technical School" was already foreseen in the legislation by means of Decree-Law No. 4,127 of 1942. This moment happened in 1968 by means of an ordinance of the MEC. The manager who spent more time under this denomination was Professor César Araripe, for 21 years. In 1973 he visited the United States with other federal managers through the United States Agency for International Development (USAID) program, for training on high school education in that country, at the University of California, San Diego.

In the 1980s the school entered the computer age with the offer of a technical course in Industrial Informatics in 1987. At that time Professor Mauro, who was the last principal of that period, was the course coordinator and was responsible for popularizing local networks for teaching purposes, and was featured in local and national fairs. At that time, innovation was also part of the school's academic environment with its students and teachers involved in the elaboration of prototypes for patents, such as the needle that disables reuse to prevent AIDS transmission, in 1991.

With the arrival of Fernando Henrique Cardoso to the presidency of Brazil, the federal technical education still had a very high recognition and quality, so much so that critics of the country's educational problems baptized the situation as "Belindia" (a fictitious conjunction of Belgium and India), citing in 1995 the case of Ceará offering only 200 vacancies for a competition of 3,000 students. The interiorization began through the Program for Expansion and Improvement of Technical Education (PROTEC), (Note: Programa de Expansão e Melhoria do Ensino Técnico) launched in Brasília in the year 1986 and made effective with the inauguration in 1995 of the Decentralized Teaching Units (UnED) (Note: Unidades de Ensino Descentralizadas) of Juazeiro do Norte and Cedro.

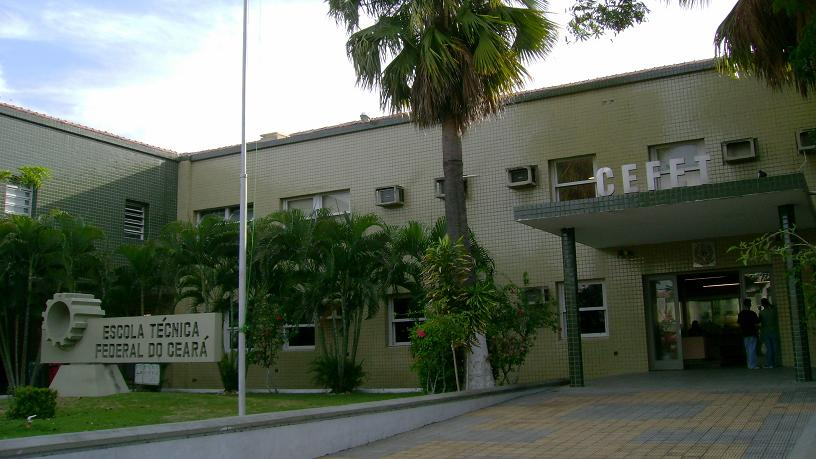
Front of the Fortaleza campus with CEFET's sign. Next to it, the old sign of the Technical Federal School of Ceará.

With the change to Federal Center for Technological Education (CEFET), (Note: Centro Federal de Educação Tecnológica) the offer of higher education courses began in 1999 with technological undergraduation courses. At the same time the Technological Research and Qualification Center (CPQT) (Note: Centro de Pesquisa e Qualificação Tecnológica) was created, a non-profit institution to manage resources for postgraduate lato sensu courses offered at that time. In 2003 LG Electronics began a partnership with CEFET, donating computers and constructing buildings and laboratories. Also, in 2006 a new classroom block was inaugurated.

It was in the change to CEFET that there was the Expansion Plan Phase II of the technological education network in the country, carried out by the Federal Government in 2007, where six pole cities in Ceará were chosen, out of 150 cities in all of Brazil, for the expansion of CEFETs. The first city to have a UnED was Maracanaú in 2007. The government of Ceará reinforced the structure with the transfer, in 2008, of the units of the Ceará Technological Education Center Institute (CENTEC) (Note: Instituto Centro de Ensino Tecnológico do Ceará) in Sobral and Limoeiro do Norte. Still in 2008, the Quixadá UnED started its activities.

=== Transformations in agricultural education ===
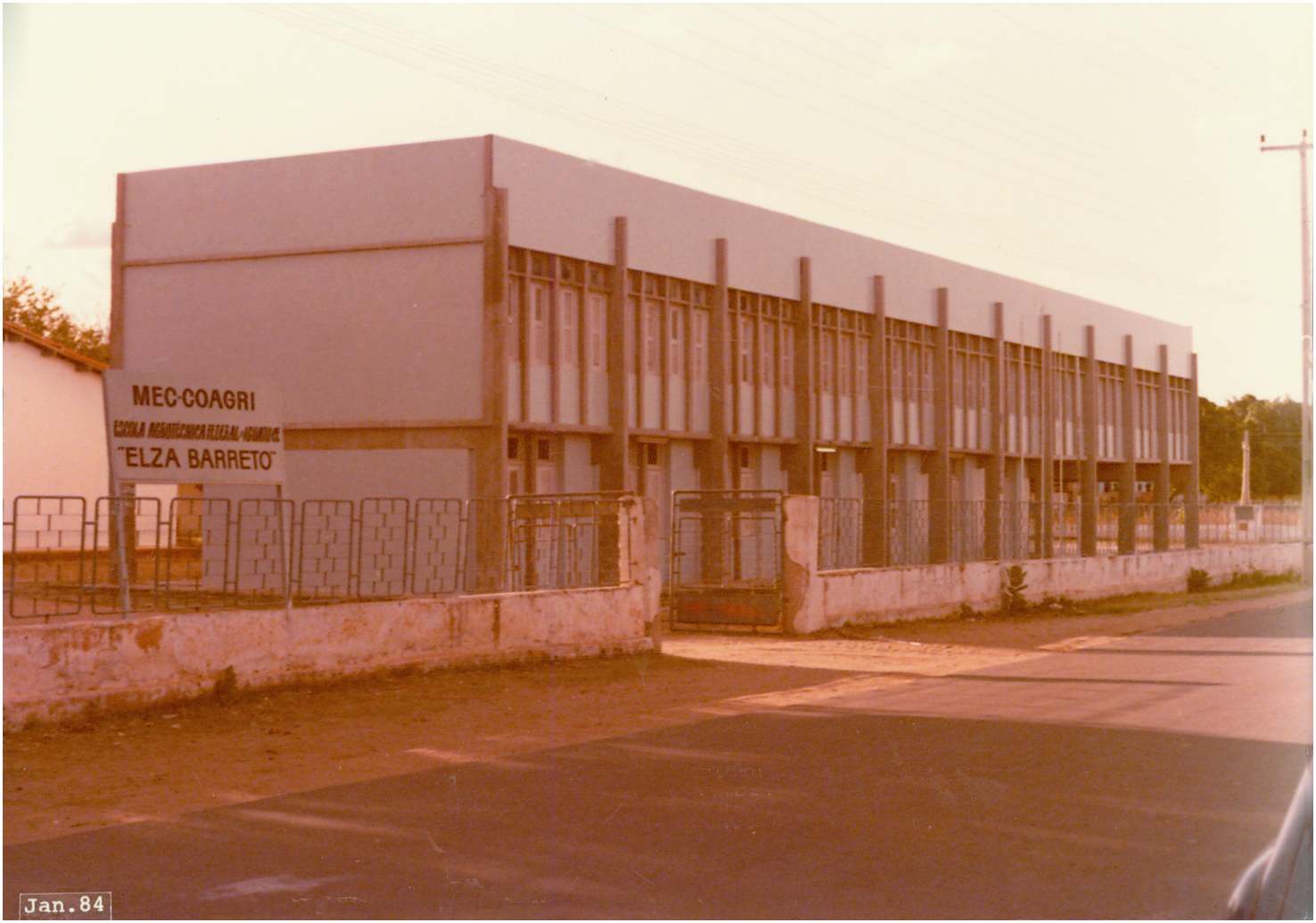
Elza Barreto Federal Agrotechnical School of Iguatu in 1984.

Federal agricultural education in Ceará was not foreseen in Decree No. 22,470 of 1947, which created the establishment network, but provided that it could be created by agreement with the federative entities. An agreement only emerged in 1954, when Federal Deputy Alencar Araripe and Minister of Agriculture João Cleofas signed an agreement for the installation of rural education in Crato. Then, the first course (tractor driving) of the Crato Agricultural School was created in the following year. Almost ten years later, in February 1964, its name changed to Agricultural School.

In 1967, the military government made a change in the management of agricultural education, transferring it from the Ministry of Agriculture, Livestock and Supply (MAPA) (Note: Ministério da Agricultura, Pecuária e Abastecimento) to the MEC. The institution was renamed, in 1979, Agrotechnical Federal School of Crato.

At that time the Organic Law of Agricultural Education, Decree-Law No. 9,613 of 1946, established an education that included women, even if in separate spaces, and also encouraged an extensive pedagogical practice, seeking the relationship of the institution with the neighborhoods. In 1983 another decree made it possible for the activities developed by the students to be marketed for the benefit of these students through school cooperatives.

The Iguatu campus of the IFCE was created in 1955, along with the Rural Home Economics extension course, still linked to the MAPA. The course sought to enable literate people to improve the standard of living at home, through embroidery, painting, cooking, sewing, crochet, knitting, agricultural practices, notions of hygiene, nursing, etc. In 1962, the MAPA created the Elza Barreto Rural Home Economics College. Its function was to train teachers for the teaching of this extension course. The technical students that graduated from the course were integrated to the development process of the region, aiming at the socioeconomic growth of the community through the introduction of techniques and knowledge in the areas, as well as combining teaching and agricultural production. Over time, the school gained recognition and, on September 4, 1979, changed its name to Federal Agrotechnical School of Iguatu.

=== Between "Technological University" and "Federal Institute" ===
In the beginning of Lula's government, there was a very high expectation in the possibility of improving professional education, notably revealed during CEFETs 2004 pedagogical meeting that made an extensive debate about the transformation to "Technological University". In the following year, with the creation of the Federal Technological University of Paraná (UTFPR), (Note: Universidade Tecnológica Federal do Paraná) the plans seemed to have a possibility of being realized and the institution elaborated a 2005–2009 Institutional Development Plan that aimed at this goal, but that was revised with the MEC's plan through its idea to expand and restructure the technological education of the federal network with a unified brand, establishing a more solid and comprehensive network.

Officially created on December 29, 2008, by Law No. 11,892, sanctioned by President Luiz Inácio Lula da Silva, the Federal Institute of Ceará is the merging of the CEFET of Ceará and the Federal Agrotechnical Schools of the cities of Crato and Iguatu. This is how the IFCE emerged in 2009, already having nine units in operation in the cities of Fortaleza, Crato, Iguatu, Juazeiro do Norte, Cedro, Maracanaú, Quixadá, Sobral, and Limoeiro do Norte, and was preparing to inaugurate in 2010 three more units, now all named as campus.

== Student life ==
=== Admission ===
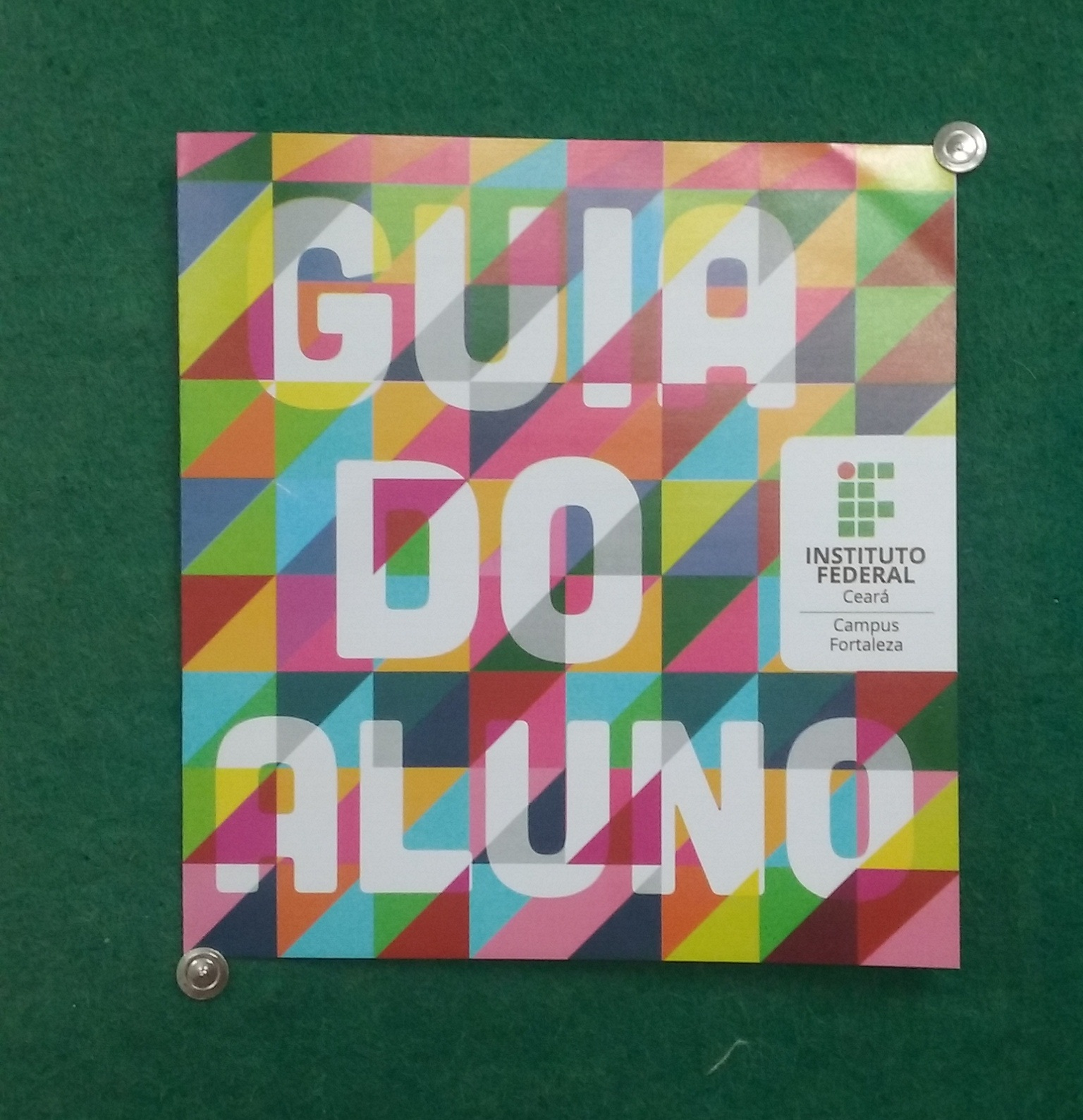
Student Guide pamphlet for those entering the Fortaleza campus.

The new institutionality of the IFCE turned the entrance in the institution into a plurality of options and possibilities that allow a broad access to the various types of education offered. In the undergraduation, the broadest means of access is the Unified Selection System (SiSU), (Note: Sistema de Seleção Unificada) adopted in 2010. It is also possible to enter the undergraduation by edicts for transfers and graduates. In new courses the Institute uses traditional exams to select the entrants.

In 2018 the institution offered 2,977 vacancies, with 54,407 candidates enrolled. In 2019 there was an increase in vacancies to 3,052, with an average cutoff score of 743.24.

Specific edicts establish the forms of selection and exams for the vacancies offered for Initial or Continuing Education courses (FIC), (Note: Formação Inicial ou Continuada) high school integrated to technical courses, separate technical courses concomitant or subsequent to high school and higher education courses.

=== Student assistance ===
As an educational institution maintained by the Federal Government, the IFCE is included in the National Program of Student Assistance (PNAES), (Note: Programa Nacional de Assistência Estudantil) which has a social goal of improving access and permanence of students in situations of social vulnerability in the institution. On all campuses there are assistance actions such as meal service, dental, medical, psychological, pedagogical and social service, nutritionist, highlighting the offer of aid that serve thousands of students from all campuses.

At the beginning of every school semester, student aid edicts are launched to select students in the areas according to Decree No. 7,234, of July 19, 2010: housing, food, transportation, glasses, technical visits and trips, academic, didactic-pedagogical, mother/father students, support for sports and culture, training and international pre-boarding. On the campuses of Umirim, Iguatu, and Crato there is also housing for the students of agricultural courses.

The students of the IFCE, when they are enrolled, are automatically included in the student insurance system. This insurance is valid for on-site and distance learning courses and only for active enrollments. The insurance covers the following accidents: accidental death, total or partial permanent invalidity by accident, and medical hospital and dental expenses.

=== Scholarships ===
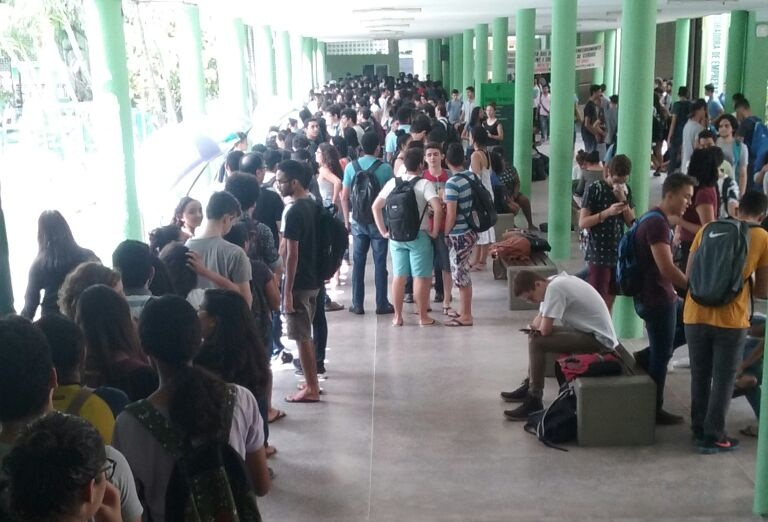
IFCE Fortaleza campus during the morning break with the line of students to get their lunch.

Several types of scholarships are offered every semester to students and researchers. For the student's academic development, there are also research scholarships governed by the Institutional Scientific Initiation Scholarship Program (PIBIC), (Note: Programa Institucional de Bolsas de Iniciação Científica) which are governed by specific edicts, always linked to the research developed by the institution's professors. These scholarships come from institutions such as National Council for Scientific and Technological Development (CNPq), (Note: Conselho Nacional de Desenvolvimento Científico e Tecnológico) Coordination for the Improvement of Higher Education Personnel (CAPES), (Note: Coordenação de Aperfeiçoamento de Pessoal de Nível Superior) and Ceará Foundation for the Support of Scientific and Technological Development (FUNCAP), (Note: Fundação Cearense de Apoio ao Desenvolvimento Científico e Tecnológico) among others.

For licentiate students, there are also scholarships from the Institutional Program of Scholarships for Initiation to Teaching (PIBID), (Note: Programa Institucional de Bolsas de Iniciação à Docência) to put into practice the teaching process of the various training areas that the IFCE offers, in public schools.

In partnership with Apple, the Brazilian Educational Program for iOS Development (BEPiD) was created in the IFCE with the launch of 70 scholarships for undergraduate students. Currently, the project is called IFCE Apple Developer Academy, and offers short and long term trainings, opening opportunities for all interested parties, students of external and internal courses to the institution.

=== Internship ===
Most of the IFCE courses have in their programs the mandatory professional internship, which is monitored by a mentor teacher and in each campus there is a sector that registers the internship enrollment and monitors the documentation and contracts with companies, which partner to hire students, notably in the capture and dissemination of vacancies for the academic community.

Agreements between the IFCE and entities are part of the list of institutions and companies that offer internships for students, such as the one signed in 2015 with the Union of the Civil Construction Industry of Ceará (Sinduscom). (Note: Sindicato da Indústria da Construção Civil do Ceará)

=== Culture and art ===
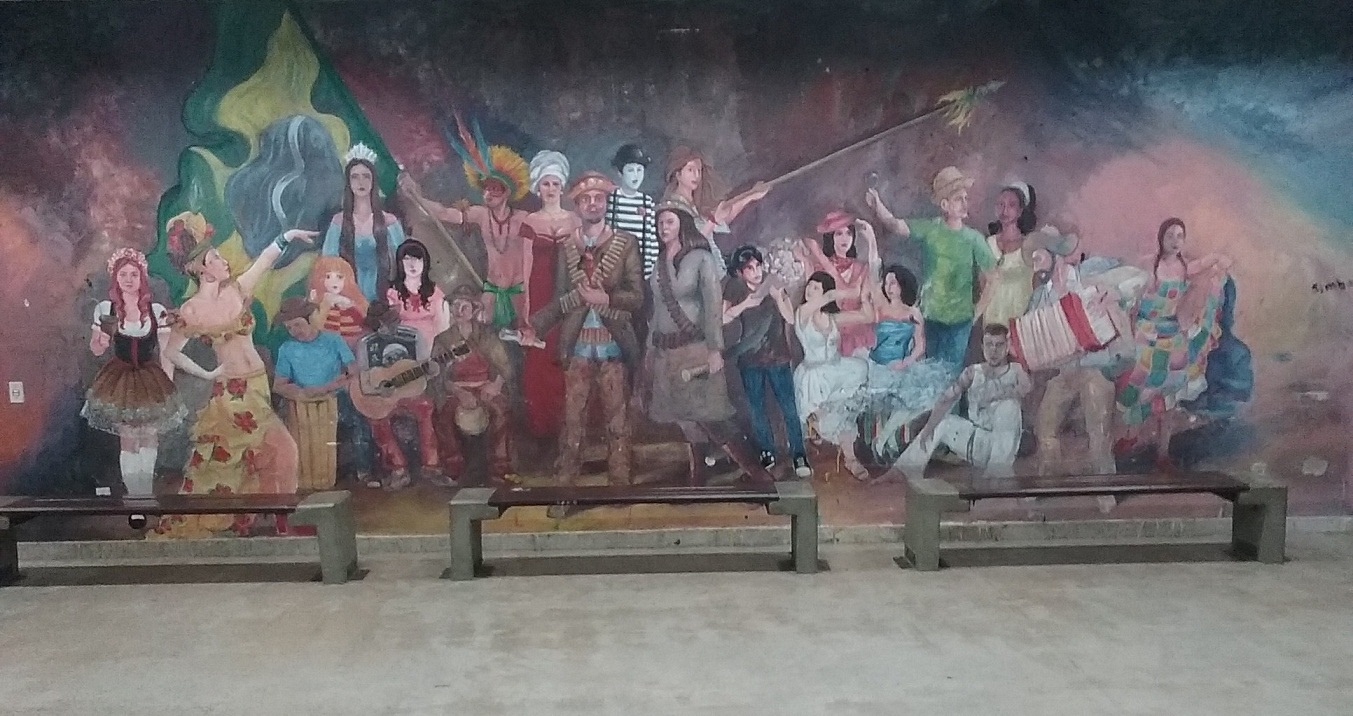
A panel made by students from the Visual Arts course at the IFCE Fortaleza campus portraying folkloric figures from the Brazilian popular culture in the courtyard of the central block of the Fortaleza campus.

The arts and culture in the IFCE have a strong tradition in Fortaleza. The choir draws attention, being in activity since 1956 and having revealed the talent of the lyrical singer Paulo Abel. Also, the IFCE was the first to have higher-level courses in the state focused on the formation of actors and plastic artists. Fortaleza's arts courses actively agitate the cultural life of the capital and the interior participating in festivals, artistic events, and salons such as: Fortaleza Theater Festival, Northeastern Theater Festival, among others. In the visual arts, undergraduates are highlighted in national and international salons with support and organization of events on the Fortaleza campus. In the interior, several campuses develop cultural activities in the areas of theater, dance, music, and folklore, organizing diverse cultural groups formed by students and also community members in extension projects.

=== Sports ===
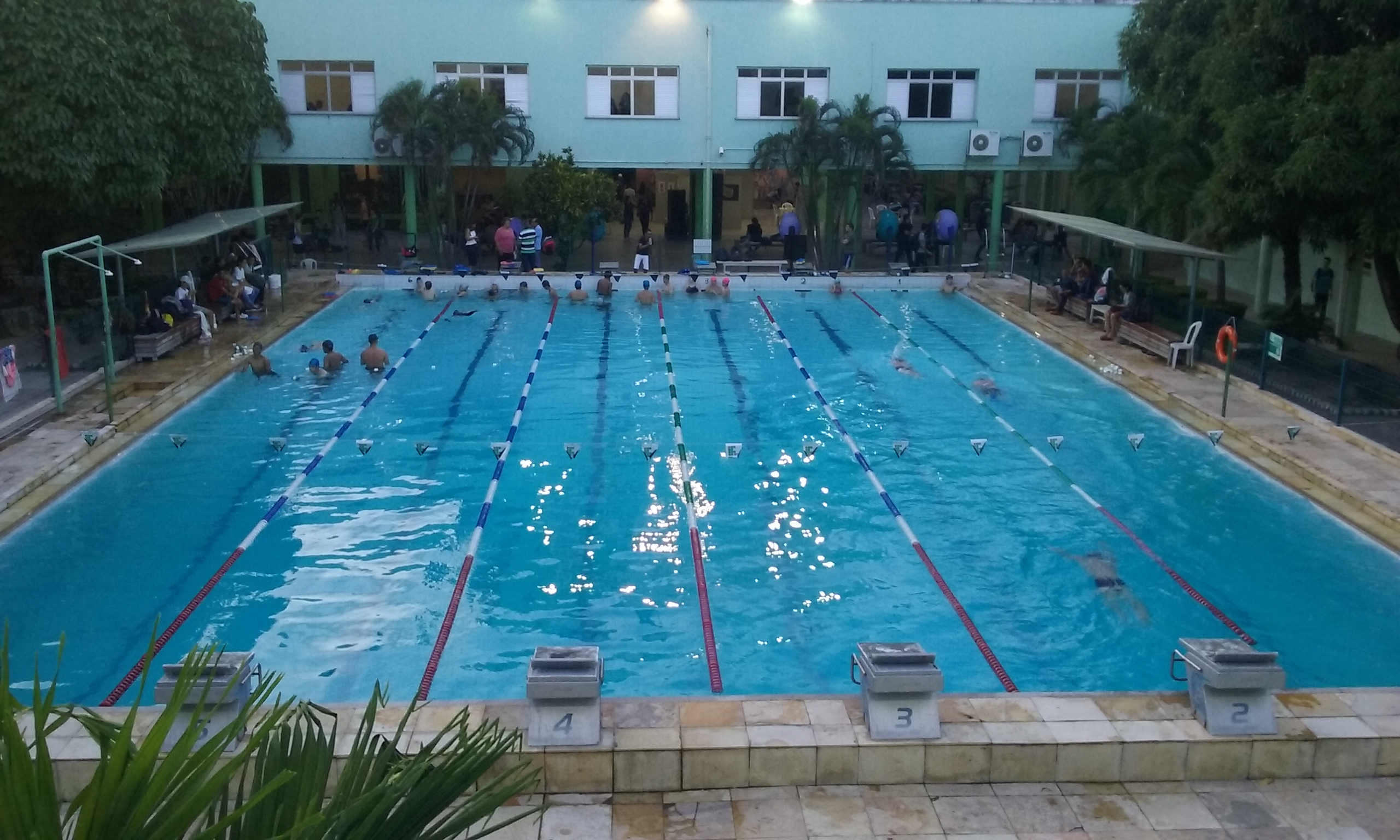
Swimming pool at the Fortaleza campus.

IFCE has a vast sport structure spread over 21 of the 32 campuses. There are 19 gyms, 9 swimming pools, 7 soccer fields, 7 weight training rooms and 3 athletics tracks. The Fortaleza campus had, until 2010, a vast structure for sports, but part of its sports park was undone to house the new structure of rooms and laboratories. In place of the athletics track a new space for sports practices was built with a gymnasium featuring sports measurements for official practices, more classrooms and gymnastics rooms and a swimming pool for water aerobics.

The Technical School started in 1975 the Ceará Federal Technical School Student Games( JETEC), (Note: Jogos dos Estudantes da Escola Técnica Federal do Ceará) which were organized until 2008. With the change to IFCE in 2009, the Institute began to organize the Federal Institute Games (JIF). (Note: Jogos do Instituto Federal) In 2018, the IFCE organized the national Federal Institutes Games, in the Northeast Olympic Training Center in Fortaleza.

In 2017 the sports in the IFCE had a breakthrough in administrative structure and participation with results at all levels in which it participated, notably the gold medals of the student Rayane Magalhães, of the higher course of Sports and Leisure Management of the Fortaleza campus. She participated in the Paralympic University Games, organized by the Brazilian Confederation of University Sports (CBDU) (Note: Confederação Brasileira do Desporto Universitário) with three gold medals in the 50 and 100-meter freestyle and 100-meter backstroke races, and also four golds in a Pan American Championship of the International Federation of University Sports (FISU). IFCE's swimming has been outstanding in the JIFs having made, in 2017, 18 medals: 4 gold, 7 silver and 7 bronze. In school, swimming is quite strong and has already generated outstanding athletes such as the student Mirna Lorena Araújo from Fortaleza, who received a high performance sports scholarship from the government of Ceará.

=== Affirmative actions ===
To promote affirmative action policies, the IFCE has organized several sectors into various groups, such as the Nuclei of Afro-Brazilian and Indigenous Studies (NEABI), (Note: Núcleos de Estudos Afro-brasileiros e Indígenas) present in 14 campuses, and the Nuclei of Accessibility to People with Specific Educational Needs (NAPNEs), (Note: Núcleos de Acessibilidade às Pessoas com Necessidades Educacionais Específicas) present in 21 campuses. These cores bring together servants and students to promote research and institutional actions of repair and adequacy of the structure to promote an environment of equity for all who make the IFCE community, such as actions of the study program on Ancestral African Dances of the Fortaleza campus.

One of the most extensive policies is the offer, in SiSU, of 50% of the openings for students from public schools. The LGBT public has institutional support, most recently through the Sexual Diversity Guide. There are also policies and actions to reduce gender inequalities as well as the fight against violence against women. Women are present in affirmative actions such as the Mulheres na Ciência (Women in Science) edict that encourages participation in research.

=== Management participation ===
By the LDB, democratic management is an IFCE principle that is determined by its mission, vision and institutional values; in addition to the statute, regulations and other documents such as the institutional political-pedagogical plan. Students participate in the management, being elected in consultative processes in the student community, exercising this democratic participation in various instances, such as the Higher Council, Academic Council, Class Council, Committee of Own Evaluation, among other collegia, which deliberate, assist and monitor the institutional management.

=== Student entities ===
The students of the IFCE have as their main representative entity the Central Students' Directory (DCE) (Note: Diretório Central de Estudantes) José Montenegro de Lima. On each campus with integrated technical education, a student council is organized, and in each higher education course there is an Academic Center (CA). (Note: Centro Acadêmico) The DCE of the institute is affiliated to the National Union of Students (UNE). (Note: União Nacional dos Estudantes) The IFCE student unions are affiliated to the Brazilian Union of Secondary Students (UBES). (Note: União Brasileira dos Estudantes Secundaristas)

In 2016, the Directorate of Student Affairs (DAE) (Note: Diretoria de Assuntos Estudantis) published a guide for the formation of student entities. The DAE has supported the entities with the sponsorship of trips for members, participation in regional and national events, as well as support in internal events and in mediation between the entities and the IFCE management. It is through the DCE that the students of Fortaleza have access to the campus card, which enables the students to pay half entrance in public transport and in events.

=== Alumni ===
To become an alumnus, the student must have completed some IFCE course and have participated in the graduation ceremony to be able to obtain the certificate or diploma, which needs to come along with the graduation ceremony, for undergraduate students. In IFs there is a graduation ceremony manual where the students participate in the planning of the event.

The Program to Accompany the Alumni of Regular Courses of the Institution was instituted in 2018 to promote the accompaniment of the egresses and promote a better insertion in the labor market and continued education, besides seeking to strengthen the relationship of the former students in a continuous manner with the institution and to better understand the training profile of the academic community.

In 1985 the Technical School began to organize a meeting of former students, the egresses, to fraternize and remember the moments lived by them during their studies in the institution with the day of the Alumni Day in December 9. In 2017 the 33rd Alumni Meeting took place. The meeting has also been the stage for honoring former students who have done relevant services to the society of Fortaleza. The commemorative date was consolidated in the institution's calendar by Ordinance No. 161 of December 9, 1983. But other campuses hold alumni meetings on other dates such as in Crato in July, and Juazeiro do Norte in September.

Below is a list of some illustrious alumni:

- Cláudio Lenz Cesar (Eletrotechnical Technician) – Physicist of the European Organization for Nuclear Research (CERN)
- Eugênio Rabelo (Building Technician) – Politician and businessman, owner of Rabelo stores
- Falcão (Building Technician) – Singer and humorist
- Flávio Paiva (Tourism Technician) – Journalist and writer
- Inácio Arruda (Electrotechnical Technician) – Politician
- Jesuíta Barbosa (Theater) – Globo actor
- Kátia Magalhães Arruda – Minister of the Superior Labor Court
- João de Lira Cavalcante Neto (Road Technician) – Writer and Jabuti Award winner
- Luiz Hermano (Building Technician) – Plastic artist
- Silvero Pereira (Theater) – Globo actor

== Teaching – Research – Outreach ==
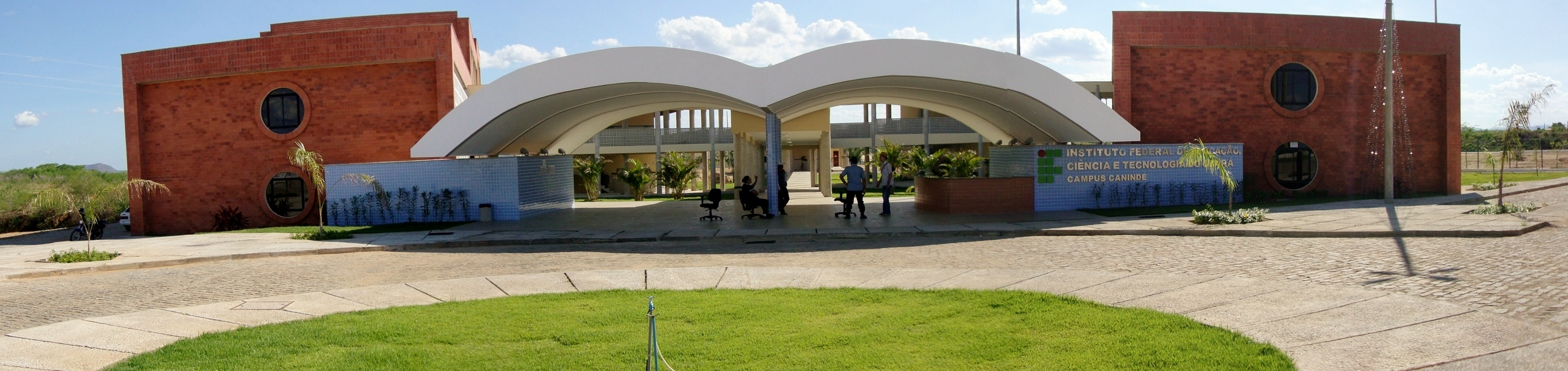
IFCE Canindé campus gate.

In the change to the new institutionality, the IFCE has deepened in the teaching organization system that is related to the universities in Brazil, performing actions distributed among teaching, research and extension. In this sense, several education policies of the federal government cover all the students served by the institution. The structure of classrooms is composed of 663 rooms.

=== Teaching ===
The IFCE offered in 2017, 247 courses at various levels and in all areas being 133 technical courses (62 subsequent, 40 concurrent, 31 integrated), 101 higher education courses (25 bachelor's degrees, 41 licentiate degrees, and 35 technological degree) and 22 graduate courses (12 specializations and 10 master's degrees). The teaching staff in 2017 was 1,417 teachers, of whom 394 (27.8%) were PhDs, 758 (53%) masters, and 210 (14.8%) specialists.

The undergraduate degrees are highlighted in the institution, being offered in all regions of the state with 41 courses in the following areas: visual arts, biological sciences, physical education, scientific and technological professional education, physics, geography, linguistics, mathematics, music, pedagogy, chemistry, and theater. Engineering majors gain prominence among undergraduate degrees with 14 courses offered in the following areas: environmental, sanitary, civil, aquacultural, computer, control, mechatronics, industrial and production, telecommunications, and mechanical.

In Distance education (EaD) (Note: Educação a Distância) the institute offers 13 technical courses, two degrees in Mathematics and Professional Science and Technology Education (EPCT), (Note: Educação Profissional Científica e Tecnológica) a technologist in Hotel Management and a specialization in Orientation and Mobility. These courses are qualified by the Open University of Brazil (UAB) (Note: Universidade Aberta do Brasil) network and by the E-Tec Network. In the most recent MEC evaluation, IFCE's EaD was rated 4. E-Tec Languages Without Borders is a partnership of IFCE with other federal institutes that was launched in 2014 and operates nationwide offering English and Spanish courses.

=== Research and innovation ===
In 2019 the IFCE began to implement its Innovation Policy, institutionally regulating the updates of the Law of Technological Innovation where a series of measures intend to streamline research and innovation actions. The entire current network that fits the actions that this Policy contemplate would then be made available for research initiatives of its faculty, students, institutions and companies that want to partner for development and innovation in IFCE laboratories. In 2018, 559 laboratories were counted in the IF units, with emphasis on the areas of Industrial Control and Processes, Information and Communication, and Natural Resources.

The research in IFCE has been consolidated in areas of emphasis of the following master's courses: Food technology (Limoeiro do Norte campus), Teaching of Science and Mathematics, Environmental Technology and Management, Telecommunications engineering and Professional in Arts (Fortaleza campus), Renewable Energies and Computer science (Fortaleza and Maracanaú campuses), Intellectual property and Technology transfer for Innovation, Professional and Technological Education and Physics Teaching (in network). There are 99 research groups in various areas of knowledge in all campuses of the state. Being a member of the National Education and Research Network (RNP) (Note: Rede Nacional de Ensino e Pesquisa) all IFCE campuses are interconnected by optical fiber with high speed internet access.

Some research results that have been highlighted by innovation: self-description tool for the visually impaired developed at the Assistive Technology Center; backpack that generates energy with body movement; flu medication based on acerola cherry and cashew, awarded in the United States, developed by student Helyson, from the technical course in natural environment in Limoeiro do Norte; the adsorption of pharmaceuticals developed by the Materials Analytics Group (GAMA) (Note: Grupo de Analítica de Materiais) from Quixadá; the Internet of Save Energy (IoSE), which is a hardware and software solution that measures and controls the electrical circuits of a consumer unit, developed at the Technological Innovation Laboratory of the Fortaleza campus; among others.

The IFCE has been developing its presence in Ceará and the result of its performance in the area of innovation is evident with the participation in projects such as the Ceará Technological Park, under development by the state government. In partnership with the government of Portugal, the IFCE will be one of the poles in Brazil of the Atlantic International Research Centre.

Another highlight in research is the partnership with the Ben-Gurion University of the Negev and the government of Israel for research in several areas, from natural environment and technological systems, along with a cooperation agreement of 3 million dollars for investments in research in Brazil.

On a national level, IFCE is a signatory of EMBRAPII, creating in Fortaleza an innovation pole focused on embedded systems, having partnership with 10 companies. Assisting all this innovative structure of the IFCE, there is the Nucleus for Technological Innovation that manages the generation of patents.

=== Outreach ===
The IFCE extension has carried out many social activities, notably the organization of short courses for the general public, in the areas of regular education of the institution, as well as sports, cultural and artistic activities, through groups and clubs of students and servants. To foster social entrepreneurship, several campuses have an Enactus team: groups of students who plan a philanthropic social activity that plans innovations in needy communities. The Enactus team from Maracanaú is a success story, having already won several local awards and achieving second place nationally in 2014. The Enactus Team from Iguatu is the most recent success case having been the national champion in 2017 and 2018, representing Brazil in the world championships in London (2017) and San Jose (2018).

In Iguatu and Crato there are also school cooperatives linked to agricultural production on these campuses. Students are also encouraged to participate in the Brazilian Youth Parliament (PJB), (Note: Parlamento Jovem Brasileiro) having achieved good placement with student Francisco Cavalcante de Sousa from the Jaguaribe campus in 2017.

Some IFCE extension actions deserve to be highlighted, such as the Training Centers for guide dog trainers and instructors and for people with visual impairment, at the Limoeiro do Norte campus (a pioneer in the Northeast); or the free Rural Environmental Registration (CAR), (Note: Cadastro Ambiental Rural) made by Crato students for small rural landowners;

=== Entrepreneurship ===
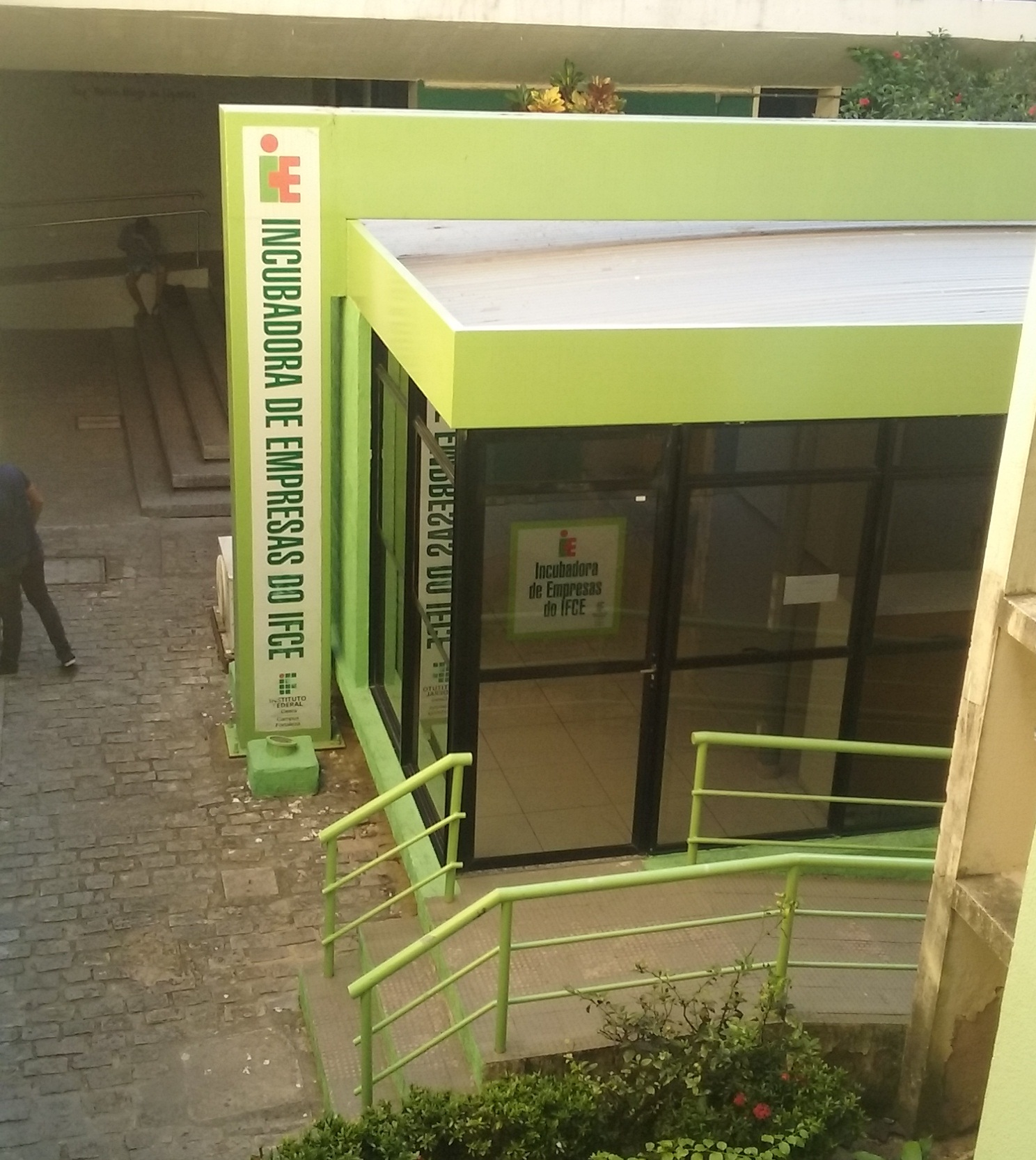
Fortaleza campus business incubator building.

The business incubator system of the IFCE started its activities with the first unit in Fortaleza in 2005. Successful cases of this incubator are the companies AED Tecnologia, creator of the mototaximeter and the computer mouse for the blind, and the company 3V3 Tecnologia, which produces agricultural automation equipment for the company Ceará Máquinas Agrícolas (Cemag). Currently several campuses are structuring spaces for incubation of entrepreneurial initiatives for students and former students. The access to the space that provides infrastructure for the development of companies is done through a specific edict, in each offering campus. In 2016 the IFCE incubators became an institutional policy with the approval of a unified regiment for all campuses. In 2017 IFCE established a partnership with the Federation of Industries of the State of Ceará (FIEC) (Note: Federação das Indústrias do Estado do Ceará) to incubate innovative business ideas from students of the institution.

Junior enterprises became an institutional policy with the enactment of the Law No. 13.267 of April 6, 2016, which disciplines the establishment of companies in educational institutions, with the partnership of Brasil Júnior, the largest entity that brings together junior enterprises in the country. In 2016 also the regulation of the Institutional Junior Enterprise Program was approved. Currently several campuses of the Institute have been implementing and improving the actions of junior enterprises: Tauá, Maracanaú, Crateús, Iguatu, Juazeiro do Norte, among other initiatives still in progress.

=== Scientific communication ===
The IFCE holds several science communication events, such as work shows and student meetings, notably the North and Northeast Congress of Research and Innovation (CONNEPI) (Note: Congresso Norte e Nordeste de Pesquisa e Inovação) and the Universo IFCE, within the National Week of Science and Technology (SNCT). (Note: Semana Nacional de Ciência e Tecnologia) Other events such as astronomical observations are held periodically, as well as lectures with scientists from various fields, open to the general public. It also participates in international events such as the GENIUS Olympiad, I-SWEEEP, an environmental sustainability fair, Mostratec International Fair, among others.

IFCE's 60 Digital Inclusion Centers function as an important initiative for scientific dissemination and basic training in underprivileged communities in 22 municipalities of the state. A highlight of the IFCE was the participation in the Brazilian Science and Engineering Fair (FEBRACE), (Note: Feira Brasileira de Ciências e Engenharia) in 2017 with the students of the Juazeiro do Norte Campus and in 2018 the student Myllena Cristyna won national awards and represented Brazil in a world fair. Also in 2018, the Fortaleza campus hosted Space Apps, an international NASA hackathon event for development of mobile apps for scientific dissemination and student Leonardo Silva de Oliveira from Cedro campus placed 3rd in the Jovem Cientista Award (Young Scientist) for high school.

=== Knowledge Olympiads ===
High school students are encouraged to participate in various Knowledge Olympiads, such as the Brazilian Mathematical Olympiad of Public Schools (OBMEP), (Note: Olimpíada Brasileira de Matemática das Escolas Públicas) Brazilian Astronomy Olympiad (OBA), (Note: Olimpíada Brasileira de Astronomia) Brazilian Biology Olympiad (OBB), (Note: Olimpíada Brasileira de Biologia) Brazilian Physics Olympiad in Public Schools (OBFEP), (Note: Olimpíada Brasileira de Física na Escola Pública) Brazilian Computer Science Olympiad (OBI), (Note: Olimpíada Brasileira de Informática) Brazilian Geography Olympiad (OBG), (Note: Olimpíada Brasileira de Geografia) Brazilian Chemistry Olympiad (OBQ), (Note: Olimpíada Brasileira de Química) National Olympiad in Brazilian History (ONHB), (Note: Olimpíada Nacional em História do Brasil) Brazilian Agricultural Olympiad (OBAP), (Note: Olimpíada Brasileira de Agropecuária) and Brazilian Robotics Olympiad (OBR). (Note: Olimpíada Brasileira de Robótica) In 2017 IFCE from Caucaia was the best public school in the OBR. Higher-level students also participate in science outreach olympiads and championships putting IFCE in the spotlight in this area as well, such as the Federal University of Ceará's noodles bridge tournament. Since 2018 the Juazeiro do Norte Campus has organized its students in participating in scientific events through the Institutional Olympic Committee (COI), (Note: Comitê Olímpico Institucional) which has become a model for all IFCE.

=== International ===
The rectory of the IFCE values the internationalization policy, having created a directorate in its structure and organizing actions in a structured way for the effectiveness of the internationalization of its actions, taking students to attend part of the courses for educational exchange, such as Ciência sem Fronteiras (Science without Borders), which enabled dozens of IFCE students to spend part of their degrees in foreign institutions, as well as bringing foreign exchange students to study in Brazil, having received students from Canada, Germany, French Guiana, Japan, Thailand, Colombia, Belgium, Cape Verde, Guinea-Bissau, and Congo, among others.

The IFCE also has several partnerships with various institutions and universities from various countries to offer scholarships and qualification of teachers and technicians. In all, since 2009, 96 teachers, 17 administrative technicians and 275 students have been sent abroad. The Mercosur Youth Parliament (PJM) (Note: Parlamento Juvenil do Mercosul) is an educational project of the agreement that has representatives from IFCE running and having elected the student Francisco Hermeson for the 2018–2020 biennium. The institution also encourages participation in the Jovens Embaixadores Program (Young Ambassadors) of the United States Embassy, in which former students of the IFCE has already achieved good positions.

=== Libraries ===
The IFCE has a library system run by the Library Department of the Education Dean's Office. There are 32 libraries, the largest of which is the Waldyr Diogo de Siqueira Library on the Fortaleza campus, with more than 50 thousand volumes in its collection. The IFCE has been structuring the libraries in each campus, to improve the support structure to the teaching-research-outreach system, with the plan to build 10 new library buildings in the Caucaia, Ubajara, Jaguaribe, Morada Nova, Tabuleiro do Norte, Umirim, Tauá, Tianguá, Baturité and Camocim campuses. The collection, in 2018, of all the institute's libraries accounted for more than 221 thousand volumes.

=== Publications ===
With a new structure focused on the management of scientific publications, IFCE is organizing a publishing house, EDIFCE, which intends to systematize the institution's editorial policy by giving more prominence and autonomy to the publication of books. During the implementation of the publishing house the institute has been making calls for the publication of books by teachers and technicians. The scientific journal Conexões is the IFCE's main journal with more than 10 years of operation and more than 100 scientific articles published.

The Coordination of scientific publications has worked to expand the IFCE's publishing spaces resulting in the emergence of new digital publications such as: Mopuã, from the areas of visual arts, dance, theater and music; the Journal of Mechatronics Engineering, which involves several engineering disciplines; and the Journal of Physical Education, Health and Sport, related to health and physical education, Acta Kariri, from the Crato campus, focused on the areas of agriculture, animal husbandry and information systems.

== Organization ==
The Superior Management of the Federal Institute of Ceará, according to its statute, is exercised initially by the Superior Council, presided over by the rector and composed of members of the community chosen by own election and also by the College of Directors, also presided over by the rector and composed of all the directors of campuses and all the pro-rectors.

The Federal Institute of Ceará needed to undergo an administrative reorganization when it merged and overlapped similar administrative structures of the agencies that gave it structure: CEFET/Ce and the Agrotechnical Schools of Crato and Iguatu. In this sense, the IFCE emerged with a rector's office in Fortaleza and five pro-rectorates in the areas of Administration, Education, Research and Innovation, Outreach, and Institutional Development. This composition of subjects for a higher management was deliberated by the last management team of the forming institutions.

With the choice of a new rector in 2012, the entire structure and planning of the institution were discussed, and with the inauguration of the new rector in 2013, there were changes in the management structure. The Pro-Rectory of Institutional Development became a directorate within the Pro-Rectory of Administration and a new Pro-Rectory of People Management emerged.

=== Campuses ===
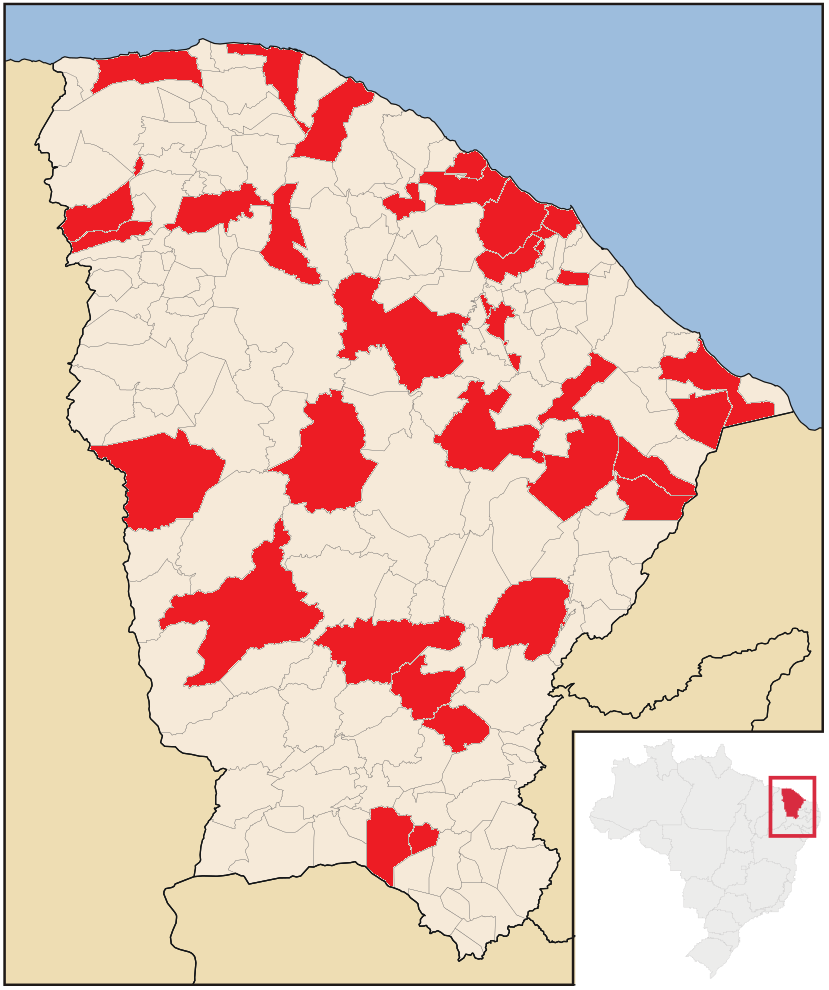
Map of Ceará with the marking of the cities that have IFCE campuses.

The current 33 IFCE campuses are spread all over the state, present in all of Ceará's mesoregions.

- Ceará Central-South Region
  - Acopiara
  - Cedro
  - Iguatu
- Jaguaribe
  - Aracati
  - Jaguaribe
  - Jaguaruana
  - Limoeiro do Norte
  - Morada Nova
  - Tabuleiro do Norte
- Ceará South Region
  - Crato
  - Juazeiro do Norte
- Fortaleza Metropolitan Region
  - Caucaia
  - Fortaleza
  - Horizonte
  - Maracanaú
  - Maranguape
  - Pecém
- Ceará Northwest Region
  - Acaraú
  - Camocim
  - Sobral
  - Tianguá
  - Ubajara
- Ceará North Region
  - Baturité
  - Canindé
  - Guaramiranga
  - Itapipoca
  - Paracuru
  - Umirim
- Sertões of Ceará
  - Boa Viagem
  - Crateús
  - Mombaça
  - Quixadá
  - Tauá

=== Staff ===
The IFCE staff is composed of public servants of its own career, such as teachers of Basic Technical and Technological Education (EBTT) (Note: Educação Básica Técnica e Tecnológica) and Administrative Technicians in Education (TAE). (Note: Técnicos Administrativos em Educação) Besides the career public servants, there are also temporary and outsourced employees, who provide complementary services to the institutional mission.

In 2008, the last year before the change to IFCE, the staff was composed of a total of 642 employees and 102 temporary employees, of which 397 were professors. In 2017, IFCE had 3,367 employees, of which 1,809 were professors and 1,556 were technicians. The IFCE employees have been congregated in the Association of Federal Technical School Employees of Ceará (ASSETECE) (Note: Associação dos Servidores da Escola Técnica Federal do Ceará) since 1981. There is a national union, National Union of Federal Servants of Basic, Professional and Technological Education (SINASEFE), (Note: Sindicato Nacional dos Servidores Federais da Educação Básica, Profissional e Tecnológica) which has several union sections in Ceará.

=== Planning and evaluation ===
In the administration sphere, the institution's activity, it is possible to exercise the triad "teaching, research and outreach" through the instruments of planning and institutional evaluation, such as the Institutional Development Plan (PDI) (Note: Plano de Desenvolvimento Institucional) and the Special Evaluation Commission (CPA). (Note: Comissão Própria de Avaliação)

The National System for Evaluation of Higher Education (SINAES) (Note: Sistema Nacional de Avaliação da Educação Superior) creates several instruments that integrate and improve the performance of institutions, especially in the possibility of action of all those who make the IFCE work, through consultations and questionnaires, and meetings. The institute has already held two planning periods, 2009–2013 and 2014–2018. The planning for the 2019–2023 period was published giving an expanded view on the current structure and planning for the implementation of the plan for the period until 2023.

Formatted by the management group, with the participation of the academic community, its principles (mission, vision and values) were revised in 2010, given the new institutionality of the IFCE, in order to adapt to the recent characteristics. After the revision made by the management group, the texts were made available to the academic community in order to collect their contributions. The Pro-Rectory of Institutional Development was in charge of monitoring this process. Once compiled, the mission, vision and values statements were submitted to the Superior Council of the IFCE, being ratified in 2011, in a resolution approving the following wordings of the principles:

==== Mission statement ====
Produce, disseminate, and apply scientific and technological knowledge in the quest to participate integrally in the citizen's education, making it more complete, aiming at their full social, political, cultural, and ethical insertion.

==== Vision statement ====
To become the standard of excellence in teaching, research and outreach in the area of science and technology.

==== Values ====
In its activities, the IFCE will value the ethical commitment with social responsibility, respect, transparency, excellence, and determination in its actions, in line with the basic precepts of citizenship and humanism, with freedom of expression, with feelings of solidarity, with the culture of innovation, with ideas fixed on environmental sustainability.

=== Financing ===
As an agency of the Federal Government, its financial management is governed by the Annual Budget Law (LOA) (Note: Lei Orçamentária Anual) and managed with institutional autonomy by the Pro-Rectory of Administration and Planning. The main basis for calculating the value of government transfers for the IFCE's management is the number of students attended, but the budget is not restricted to the values assigned by the LOA. Funding institutions and scientific development also influence the budget system, notably in the offer of scholarships and the expansion of the structure of laboratories and libraries. Between 2014 and 2018 the budget of the Federal Institute of Ceará had an increase in personnel expenses of almost 80% due to the increase in the number of servers. in the same period enrollments increased 300% while the costing increased only 26%.

Budget realized in the 2014–2018 period (in Brazilian reais)
Expenditure group	2014	2015	2016	2017	2018	2014–2018
Staff	266,410,128	352,419,780	325,043,911	419,576,405	456,563,101	1,820,013,325
Costing	102,519,516	108,022,701	118,764,304	121,061,781	129,840,732	580,209,034
Investment	83,500,351	63,535,927	45,358,522	9,839,883	11,971,735	214,206,418
Total	452,429,995	523,978,408	489,166,737	550,478,069	598,375,568	2,614,428,777

=== Supporting Foundation ===
The Foundation for Supporting Education, Research and Extension of the IFCE (FAIFCE) (Note: Fundação de Apoio ao Ensino, a Pesquisa e a Extensão do IFCE) began its activities effectively in 2020. Its main role is to be the manager of resources from other non-governmental sources for the promotion of teaching, research, and outreach of the institution. Performing the implementation and management of agreements and contracts that formalize projects signed between IFCE and funding partners. In 2020 three projects have already started to be managed by FAIFCE: two projects with the Chinese telecommunications company Huawei and another one with the National Department of Works Against Droughts (DNOCS). (Note: Departamento Nacional de Obras Contra as Secas)

=== Open government ===
Carrying forward, in the scope of the IFCE, the open government policy, accountability systems have been implemented, such as IFCE em Números (IFCE in Numbers), an initiative awarded by the government, which allows both information for planning, as well as accountability with academic information of the institution. The system of management transparency is carried out by providing accounts on the Federal Government's Portal da Transparência (Transparency Portal), as well as by publishing all the institutional acts in the Service Bulletin of each unit and also in reports from each sector by the pro-rectors every year or planning cycle.

The IFCE also has an ombudsman office, which operates from the rectory, to specifically meet each specific demand for access to information, directing the sectors and reporting to the Union's General Ombudsman Office. The institute is part of the Nilo Peçanha Platform, which publishes data from all the institutions in the Federal Technological Education Network with academic and budgetary data, giving a very complete panorama of teaching, budgetary management, and people management.

=== Environmental sustainability ===
The environmental management of the IFCE is nominally present in its values, as an idea present in its activities. In this sense the socio-environmental responsibility is converted into actions such as the Coleta Seletiva Solidária (Solidary Waste Sorting), established in several campuses, which aims to destinate the genareted waste to waste collectors groups, to improve the processes of selection and destination of recycling. Through the Environmental Agenda of the Federal Public Administration (A3P) (Note: Agenda Ambiental da Administração Pública Federal) the Institute implements actions such as: IFCE de Responsabilidade Socioambiental (IFCE of Socio-environmental Responsibility) and Limpo e Verde (Clean and Green). There are actions for the implementation of clean energy generation, such as the installation of photovoltaic solar energy in campuses like Maracanaú, Juazeiro do Norte and planning in Fortaleza.

== Controversies ==
=== Strikes and demonstrations ===
After the new Brazilian Constitution of 1988 came into effect, the servants of the Federal Technical School of Ceará organized a union and had the right to strike. Since the creation of the IFCE, strikes have taken place in 2011, 2012 and 2015. Having participated in the 2012 and 2015 strikes on federal public education in Brazil, (the 2015 one being the largest ever recorded), even though such stoppages were motivated by agendas for improvements in education in the federal system and for better salary conditions for education servants, delays in the academic calendar have affected the offer of new vacancies and the graduation of students.

In 2014 students from the Fortaleza campus carried out an intense mobilization for the free pass and half pass on public transportation that resulted in a confrontation with police forces and occupation of public roads and the IFCE building. The situation led to the cancellation of classes on that day of the demonstration. In the same year, the servantss also held a demonstration for the 30-hour working time, asking the institution's rector's office to implement regulations that regulate this possibility of work, and there was a paralysis of activities on several campuses.

=== Moral harassment ===
Within the strikes' agendas, besides the fight for better structural conditions, the fight against moral harassment is an ever constant agenda of the servers. In 2011 a female servant of the Quixadá campus denounced her bosses, notably during the strike, and took legal action against the institution, which resulted in the dismissal and later judicial condemnation of the bosses to pay fines for the moral damage caused to the servant. In 2017 the shadow of harassment came through the wave of religious anti-gender movement attacks on sex eds, mobilizing teachers in search of guarantees of rights in various instances, such as the Public Defender of the State of Ceará.

=== Sexual harassment and violence ===
Reports of harassment have emerged and generated insecurity within the IFCE campuses. In Maracanaú a civil servant was removed in 2018 and is being administratively sued for sexual harassment. Already in 2017, on the Fortaleza campus, an attempted rape left the academic community very shaken, revealing a situation of insecurity on campus, which reacted by increasing the number of cameras and more rigor in the entry of students and visitors. The situation in Fortaleza generated a mobilization, with several demonstrations by students and the community.

=== Expansion ===
After the change of institutionality that created a new form of educational institution and that intended to be extensive throughout the country offering high school, technical and higher education, an expansion agenda was implemented that generated criticism for having created situations in which the quality of working and teaching conditions were compromised in exchange for the political image of inauguration and new spaces for teaching. An example of this was the conversion of the farm in the city of Umirim that was transformed into a campus generating criticism and mobilization for the improvement of working conditions and safety with demonstrations in 2014, of the servers and students of the campus, such as hiring outsourced contractors for security and general services, and various constructions. Even with these criticisms the management tried to clarify the situation informing that such agendas are part of plans that escape the management, as well as contingencies of funds by the federal government management. Problems in contests for the increase of servers also arose throughout the expansion, which generated strong criticism from the union.

=== COVID-19 pandemic in Brazil ===
At the beginning of the COVID-19 pandemic in Brazil, in the IFCE, as well as all in the whole country, the mood was of anxiety and many uncertainties. The institution established a pandemic management committee that established the paralysis of face-to-face activities from March 16, 2020. The suspension was being extended for the entire period of the year 2020 and in the initial months norms and strategies for distance learning and training were being formulated for faculty and technicians to carry out their activities and attend to students.

Economic difficulties, already as a result of the paralysis of the economy by the pandemic, generated several criticisms about a return to distance classes, but the Institute tried to remedy these difficulties with the maintenance of scholarships and the reformulation of educational aids to the social panorama of the moment and planned the distribution to low-income students, tablets and chips to access remote classes. Criticism of the means of support and the remote work system were accumulating and the servants' union made several complaints and filed a lawsuit, in an attempt to adjust the activities to a better working and teaching condition.

== See also ==
- Federal Institute of Education, Science and Technology
- Universities and higher education in Brazil
- Federal Centers for Technological Education (CEFET)
- List of universities in Brazil by state

== Bibliography ==
- Camara, João (1922). Almanach estatístico, administrativo, mercantil, industrial, e literário do Estado do Ceará (in Brazilian Portuguese). Fortaleza: TYP.
- Castelo, Plácido Aderaldo (1970). História do Ensino no Ceará (in Brazilian Portuguese). Fortaleza: Impressa Oficial.
- Gadelha, Severina (2004). Antes que ninguém conte... eu conto (in Brazilian Portuguese). Fortaleza: CEFET-CE.
- Gadelha, Severina (2010). Educação profissional com compromisso social: cem anos de uma caminhada singular (in Brazilian Portuguese). Fortaleza: IFCE.
- Madeira, Maria das Graças de Loyola (1999). Recompondo memórias da educação: a Escola de Aprendizes Artífices do Ceará (1910–1918) (in Brazilian Portuguese). Fortaleza: CEFET-CE.
- Magalhães, Suzana Marly da Costa; Barreto, José Anchieta Esmeraldo (1993). O ensino profissional no Brasil: o caso da Escola Técnica Federal do Ceará (in Brazilian Portuguese). ISSN 0102–1117.
- Santos, Deribaldo (2017). Os cem anos do CEFET/ CE: compromisso social, desenvolvimento tecnológico e aproximação com o mercado (PDF) (in Brazilian Portuguese). Fortaleza: EdUECE. ISBN 9788578265250.
- Silva, Solonildo Almeida da; Silva, Simone Cesar da (2014). Arte: interlocuções IFCE e UFC (in Brazilian Portuguese). ISBN 978-85-420-0103-7
