= Umari =

Umari may refer to:

== Places ==
- Umari, Brazil
- Umari State, a village and former princely state in Mahi Kantha, Gujarat, India
- Umari River, Brazil
- Umari, Central Papua
- Umari, Iran, a village in Bushehr Province, Iran
- Umari District, Peru

== Other uses ==
- Al-Omari
- Umari (fruit) (Poraqueiba sericea), an Amazonian fruit
- Umari Hatcher (born 2002), American football player
