= Icó =

Municipality in Ceará, Brazil

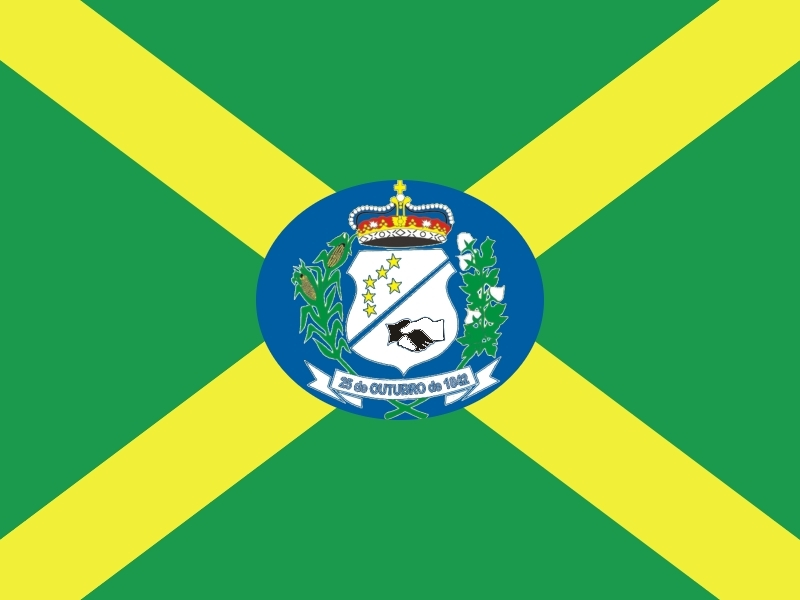
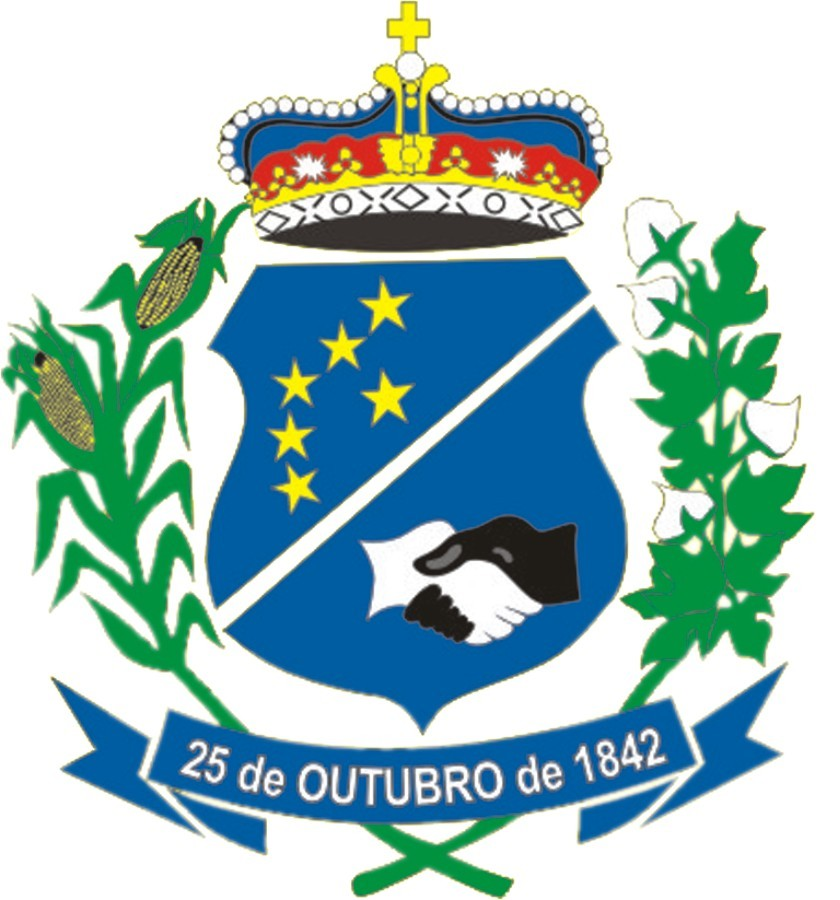
- Flag Coat of arms

- Coordinates: 06°24′03″S 38°51′43″W
- Country: Brazil
- Region: Northeast
- State: Ceará
- Founded: October 25, 1738

Government
  - Mayor: Ana Lais Peixoto Correia Nunes

Area
  - Total: 1,872 km^{2} (723 sq mi)
- Elevation: 153 m (502 ft)

Population (2021)
  - Total: 68,303
  - Density: 36.49/km^{2} (94.50/sq mi)
- Time zone: UTC−3 (BRT)
- HDI (2000): 0.607 – medium

Icó (Portuguese pronunciation: [iˈkɔ]) is a town in Ceará, Brazil, located in the Microrregião of Salgado in the central part of the state. Icó borders the municipalities of Umari, Cedro, Iguatu, Orós, Jaguaribe, Pereiro, and the states of Rio Grande do Norte and Paraíba. The seat of the town, also called Icó, is located 375 kilometres (233 mi) from the state capital, Fortaleza. The municipality covers 1,872 km^{2} (723 mi^{2}) and has a population of 68,162 with a population density of 36 inhabitants per square kilometer. It is located 1,872 km (1,163 mi) from the state capital of Sergipe, Aracaju.

Icó sits on a flat plain on the right bank of the Salgado River, a short distance from its confluence with the Jaguaribe.

== History ==
The greater area of central Ceará was explored in the 17th century with the town being founded in 1738. Icó reached its greatest point of development in the 18th century as a commercial center connecting the hinterlands of the sertão and the coast. Its development declined due to successive droughts and a domestic cattle market centered on the south and southeastern provinces of Brazil. This process was accentuated by the construction of the Baturité Railroad in 1870, which left Icó on the fringe of regional trade.

In the mid-19th century the "Teatro da Ribeira dos Icós" was built. The town also has a historic church.

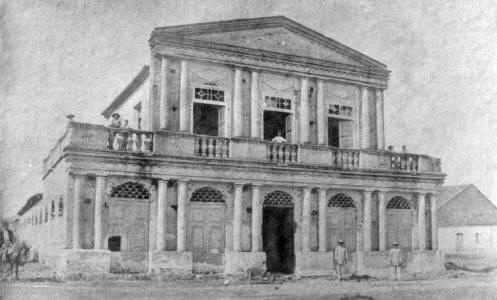
The theatre in 1900

== See also ==
- List of municipalities in Ceará
