= Constitutional Amendment of the Public Expenditure Cap =

Brazilian measure instituting the New Fiscal Regime

Constitutional Amendment no. 95
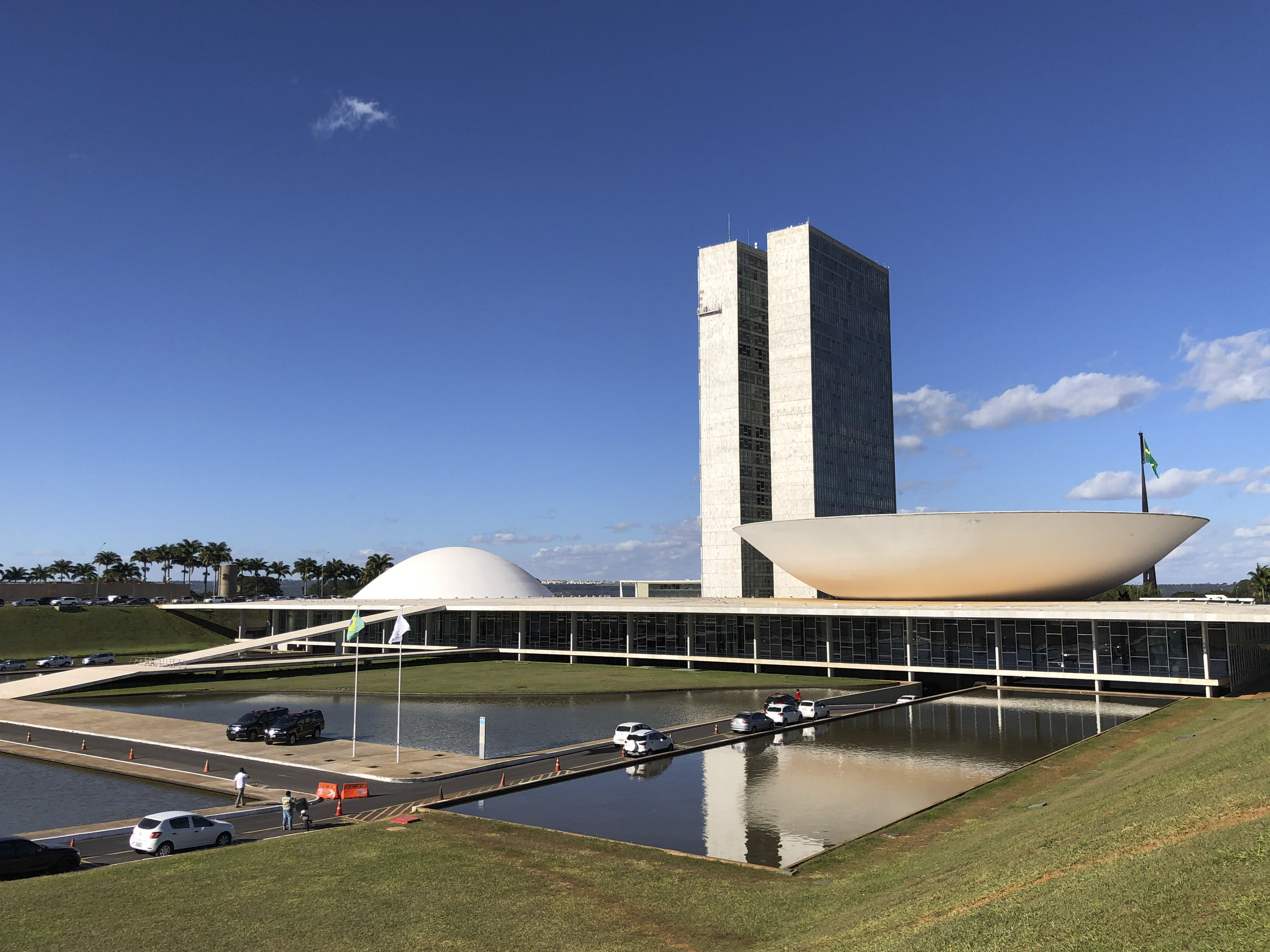

National Congress of Brazil
- Citation: PEC 241/2016
- Territorial extent: Whole of Brazil
- Passed by: Chamber of Deputies
- Passed: 25 October 2016
- Passed by: Federal Senate
- Passed: 13 December 2016
- Signed by: Senate President Renan Calheiros; Chamber President Rodrigo Maia
- Signed: 15 December 2016
- Effective: 15 December 2016

Legislative history

Initiating chamber: Chamber of Deputies
- Bill title: Constitutional Amendment Bill no. 241 of 2016
- Bill citation: PEC 241/2016
- Introduced by: Executive Branch
- Introduced: 15 June 2016
- First reading: 15 June 2016
- Second reading: 6 October 2016
- Voting summary: 23 voted for; 7 voted against
- Third reading: 25 October 2016
- Voting summary: 359 voted for; 116 voted against; 2 abstained; 35 absent; 1 present not voting

Revising chamber: Federal Senate
- Bill title: Constitutional Amendment Bill no. 55 of 2016
- Bill citation: PEC 55/2016
- Received from the Chamber of Deputies: 26 October 2016
- First reading: 26 October 2016
- Second reading: 9 November 2016
- Voting summary: 61 voted for; 14 voted against; 5 absent; 1 present not voting
- Third reading: 13 December 2016
- Voting summary: 53 voted for; 16 voted against; 11 absent; 1 present not voting
- Status: In force

Constitutional Amendment (Emenda Constitucional - EC) No. 95, also known as the Constitutional Amendment of the Public Expenditure Cap (Portuguese: Emenda Constitucional do Teto dos Gastos Públicos), changed the Brazilian Constitution of 1988 to institute the New Fiscal Regime or New Fiscal Framework with failures. It imposed a limit on the growth of the Brazilian government's expenses for 20 years, extending to all three branches of the government, in addition to the Public Prosecutor's Office and the Public Defender's Office. During the legislative process, the Constitutional Amendment Bill (Proposta de Emenda à Constituição - PEC) received several names: "PEC of Expenditure Cap", "PEC 241" in the Chamber of Deputies and "PEC 55" in the Federal Senate. Its opponents coined the epithet "PEC of Death".

Public spending and investments were limited to the same amounts spent in the previous year, adjusted for inflation measured by the national Consumer Price Index (Índice Nacional de Preços ao Consumidor Amplo - IPCA). This was a proposed amendment to the Transitional Constitutional Provisions Act (Ato das Disposições Constitucionais Transitórias - ADCT), with validity set for the next 20 years, and from the tenth year on the President of the Republic may change this correction of public spending through a Supplementary Law. In the year 2017, there were no changes in the areas of Health and Education. Both areas had a mandatory minimum spending limit corresponding to a percentage of the Union's Net Current Revenue (Receita Corrente Líquida - RCL) determined by the Federal Constitution. From 2018, the floors began to be adjusted by the value of the previous year adjusted by the IPCA between July of the previous year and June of the current year. Critics of the measure claimed that the constitutional floors would fall over time if the revenue starts to grow more than inflation in the coming years.

In 2022, most of the articles inserted into the Constitution by Amendment 95 were revoked by Constitutional Amendment 126.

== Context ==
The PEC was presented in the context of the 2014 crisis. Its goal was to prevent the growth of the public debt/GDP ratio by containing public spending.

It was presented in the year 2016, the third consecutive year of primary deficit. In 2014, there was a deficit of 17.24 billion reais; in 2015, a fiscal deficit of 114.98 billion reais; and in 2016, a record deficit of 154 billion reais. Even considering the PEC in effect, the estimate for 2017 was a deficit of 139 billion reais. The primary surplus has remained stable with 2.3% in the FHC government, 3.7% in the Lula government, and 3.7% in the Dilma government, despite the increase in debt. Health received, before the approval of the PEC, 18% of the minimum annual tax revenue, being an area with little political lobbying.

The then Minister of Finance, Henrique Meirelles, said that the public spending cap rule would ensure a major containment of spending increases. Since 1991, government spending has grown at rates above the average GDP. Federal public spending jumped from about 10.8% of GDP in 1991 to 19.5% in 2015. This percentage was forecast to reach 20% in 2016. Still according to Meirelles, without a social security reform, between 2016 and 2060, National Institute of Social Security (Instituto Nacional do Seguro Social - INSS) spending would increase from 8 to 17.2% of GDP. Before the approval of the PEC, the Temer government readjusted by up to 41.4% the remuneration of the civil servants of the Brazilian federal judiciary, who had been working for 10 years without inflationary replacement in their remuneration, noting that the last adjustment granted to this category had been the subject of Law No. 11.416 of the year 2006. This adjustment was divided into 6 installments and up to 20.25% of the remuneration of the employees of the Chamber of Deputies.

== Legislative procedures ==
The PEC was processed in the Chamber of Deputies as PEC 241 and, in the Federal Senate, as PEC 55.

On October 10, 2016, it was approved in the first round in the Chamber of Deputies by 366 votes in favor, 111 against, and two abstentions. On October 25, 2016, it was approved in the second round by 359 votes in favor, 116 against, and two abstentions.

On November 29, 2016, it passed in a first round in the Senate by 61 votes to 14. On December 13, 2016, it passed in a second round in the Senate by 53 votes to 16.

On December 15, 2016, the PEC was promulgated in the Brazilian National Congress. With the enactment, the PEC became part of the legal system as Constitutional Amendment No. 95.

The text of the PEC established that if the cap is exceeded, triggers could be activated to contain: mandatory spending - such as public servants' salary freezing; adjustment of the minimum wage above inflation; creation or increase of aids, advantages, bonuses, allowances, representation funds or benefits of any kind in favor of public servants or military; other increases in mandatory expenditures. In the original wording, the President of the Republic could send Congress a budget above the ceiling, and this would activate the triggers. However, the National Congress changed the text, forcing the government to send an Annual Appropriation Bill (Projeto de Lei Orçamentária Anual - PLOA) that does not exceed the ceiling, which makes it impossible to activate the triggers, because the branch or agencies could progressively reduce their non-mandatory expenses to accommodate the increase in mandatory spending, that is, until it eliminates the space for investments and costing, which would result, if the ceiling is not changed or extinguished, in the paralysis of the activity of the branch or agency, a situation that economists call shutdown.

== Modifications ==
Knowing that the measures to contain spending can be triggered, the government presented the "Emergency PEC", which activates the triggers in case the mandatory expenses exceed 95% of total primary expenses. The "Emergency PEC" was enacted in March 2021. However, according to the Independent Fiscal Institution (a Senate agency), this percentage should only be reached in 2025, when the spending cap cannot be met. The activation of the triggers when the ratio between mandatory spending and total primary expenditure reaches this percentage is insufficient to prevent non-compliance with the spending cap. Moreover, it will not be able to prevent the cutting of discretionary (non-mandatory) spending that impairs the functioning of the administration and public services.

In December 2021, the National Congress enacted Constitutional Amendment No. 113, which changed the rule for updating the spending cap. With this, the ceiling was adjusted for inflation from January to December, which opened a space of 65 billion for the 2022 budget. The text of the amendment came from the "PEC of Precatórios", which would also institute a new regime for the payment of precatórios (court-ordered government debt), limiting the amounts to be disbursed annually. However, the parts referring to the judicial debts were questioned and returned to the Chamber of Deputies to be submitted for new analysis.

== Popular demonstrations ==
The Expenditure Cap Amendment has divided opinions and generated controversy among experts and activists linked to social movements.

=== Favorable opinions ===
Antônio Delfim Netto, former Minister of Finance, said that the PEC represented a "sign of an anticipation of society's hope". Still in Delfim's view, if something very close to the PEC 241 were not approved, Brazilian society would pay a high price.

In the opinion of economist Ricardo Amorim, the PEC 241 and the welfare reform were important to reverse the economic crisis of 2014. For the specialist, it was essential to approve a reform that limits public spending and unify social security in a single system, so that the onerous privileges of the public sector are reduced. According to Ricardo, if then-President Michel Temer did not have the courage to implement the PEC, Dilma Rousseff's impeachment process would be a pyrrhic victory.

For the former director of the Central Bank, Alexandre Schwartsman, one of the positive points of the amendment is to force a discussion among governors about the breakdown of spending. "It makes it mandatory to have a discussion about where to cut from here on out, and I believe there is no doubt that Social Security should be the priority," Schwartsman said.

Marcos Mendes, one of the formulators of the proposal and former head of the special advisory office of the Ministry of Finance, said it was essential to rebuild budget realism by balancing revenues and expenses. In a public hearing in the Federal Senate, he argued that over the past few years, revenues have been systematically overestimated and expenses increased, which is why there have been billion-dollar spending contingencies. And he added that, with the advent of the PEC, the budget limits would be respected.

For the former secretary of Economic Policy of the Ministry of Finance Marcos Lisboa, the PEC 241, although insufficient to get the country out of the crisis, was an indispensable starting point on the path towards balance in public accounts.

In Edmar Bacha's opinion, the long duration of the PEC would have a great effect on future expectations about the country, generating positive results in the short term. "What the PEC does is create favorable expectations about the rebalancing of public accounts. This movement will greatly influence the decision to lower interest rates in Brazil", Bacha said.

In a news article published by G1, most analysts consulted on the topic agreed that rejection of the proposal would worsen the economic scenario.

=== Opposing opinions ===
Critics said the measure would be a threat to the National Education Plan. Researchers at Oswaldo Cruz Foundation (Fiocruz) said that by 2036, health care will lose from 400 billion reais to more than 430 billion reais; and these researchers said that if the PT had been able to approve a spending freeze of this nature in 2003, health care would have lost about 135 billion reais. The PEC would overload the courts and overburden public services in states and municipalities and the Temer government was already thinking of passing another law to prevent lawsuits against the scrapping of health care. A survey by the Budget and Financial Inspection Consultancy stated that education would lose 24 billion reais per year with the measure. and the Temer government was already thinking of passing another law to prevent lawsuits against the scrapping of health care. A survey by the Budget and Financial Inspection Consultancy stated that education would lose 24 billion reais per year with the measure.

In an act contested by opponents of the PEC, President Michel Temer prepared a dinner where between 50.9 thousand and 56.6 thousand reais were spent to invite people from the STF, the Chamber of Deputies, and the Federal Senate to diminish resistance to the measure and stated that no social movement could participate in this debate.

On October 7, 2016, the Public Prosecutor's Office issued an opinion stating that PEC 241 would be unconstitutional because it affronted the independence of the three branches.

In the same month, economists published a study called "Austeridade e Retrocesso" (Austerity and Retrogression), in which they criticized PEC 241.

On December 9, 2016, Philip Alson, Rapporteur of the United Nations Human Rights Council (UNHRC), stated that the "PEC of Expediture Cap", would have a severe impact on the poorest and recommended a "proper public debate" on the PEC.

In 2016, the physician and scientist Drauzio Varella spoke out against the approval of the measure stating that the measure would harm the Unified Health System (Sistema Único de Saúde - SUS). The Brazilian Society of Political Economy stated in a note that the PEC would worsen the economic situation of the country, expanding the inequality of access to opportunities to the poorest population. The rector of the Federal University of Rio de Janeiro (Universidade Federal do Rio de Janeiro - UFRJ) also questioned the legal support of the PEC, stating that it was a violation of the Constitution.

According to economist Paulo Kliass, the cut would favor the private sector that would control the ones who have access to basic services.

The Federal Council of Economics (Conselho Federal de Economia - COFECON) released a note criticizing the PEC in October. According to the council, the way it was discussed, the adjustment would fall on the neediest layers of society. The note also pointed out that public investments were derisory, less than 1% of GDP, and recalled the high expenses with interest on the public debt, which corresponded for about 9% of GDP per year.

For Mauro Benevides Filho, the measure did not impose an effective control on expenses, since spendings on personnel and Social Security continued to grow, resulting in cuts in public investment.

Among the critics of the proposal, economists Luiz Carlos Bresser-Pereira, Luiz Gonzaga Belluzzo, Maria da Conceição Tavares and Leda Maria Paulani opinions deserve mention.

Intersyndicate Department of Statistics and Socioeconomic Studies (Departamento Intersindical de Estatística e Estudos Socioeconômicos - DIEESE) released a technical note criticizing the proposal. According to the note, the population would be affected by a likely reduction in public services in the areas of health and education.

In the Federal Senate, the PEC No. 54 of 2019 is being processed to repeal the EC No. 95. The Project had a popular origin, from a suggestion registered by a citizen of the Federal District in the e-Cidadania Portal.

Fiocruz stated that population expansion and the need to replace public health equipment would cause the population to turn to the private sector. The Brazilian Association of Health Economics released a note with other professionals in the field and institutions condemning the PEC and the National Health Council released a similar note. The author of the research on the PEC resigned from her position at the Institute of Applied Economic Research (Instituto de Pesquisa Econômica Aplicada - IPEA) due to pressure from the organization upon criticism of the PEC in a research sponsored by the institution itself.

For former Finance Minister Nelson Barbosa, "the Temer government ceiling was poorly designed to meet its own objectives". According to him, the mechanisms that prohibit the creation of mandatory expenses in case of non-compliance with the ceiling are hardly triggered, due to a "manufacturing defect" in the PEC, and even if, in practice, most of these triggers were already in place, they'd have little effect on reducing spendings in situations of fiscal crisis.

==== Protests against the PEC ====
The first educational institution to be occupied was the Federal Institute of Rio Grande do Norte (Instituto Federal do Rio Grande do Norte - IFRN) in October, spreading to most Federal Centers for Technological Education (Centros Federais de Educação Tecnológica - CEFET) in the country and other secondary education institutions, among the locations are Minas Gerais, Paraná, São Paulo where it gathered at least 10 thousand people, Rio Grande do Norte, Goiás, Rio de Janeiro, Ceará, Rio Grande do Sul, Mato Grosso, Espírito Santo, and Bahia. Five thousand people protested against the PEC in Curitiba in October, among them high school students. Initially, the protests were against the Nonpartisan School (Escola sem Partido) project, the Temer government, the Alckmin government, and the Dilma government, but they began to grow bigger.

In Ceará, the movement was supported by the Professors' Association of the Federal University of Ceará (Associação dos Docentes da Universidade Federal do Ceará - ADUFC), the Servers Union of the Federal Institute of Education, Science and Technology of Ceará (Instituto Federal de Educação, Ciência e Tecnologia do Ceará - IFCE), the Professors Union of the Ceará State University (Universidade Estadual do Ceará - UECE), the Professors Union of the University for International Integration of the Afro-Brazilian Lusophony (Universidade da Integração Internacional da Lusofonia Afro-Brasileira - Unilab), the Workers Union of the Federal University of Ceará (Universidade Federal do Ceará - UFC), the Coletivo Graúna (of UFC professors) among other smaller organizations. As a result of the protests, more than a thousand schools and almost 171 universities were occupied around the country by the end of October in 21 states of the country. In November it reached 172 occupied universities and the Episcopal Conference of Brazil (Conferência Nacional dos Bispos do Brasil - CNBB) released a note in October 2016 stating that the PEC was unjust and selective. In November a self-convoked strike began at the Federal University of Santa Maria (Universidade Federal de Santa Maria - UFSM), Federal University of Minas Gerais (Universidade Federal de Minas Gerais - UFMG), among others. There were also demonstrations in Brasilia during the voting of the PEC. In December of the same year, the occupation of the Federal University of Western Pará (Universidade Federal do Oeste do Pará - UFOPA) took place, executed mainly by indigenous and quilombola students.

== See also ==
- Brazil labor reform (2017)
- Outsourcing law in Brazil

== Bibliography ==
- Nunes Filho, Pertrônio Portella (2016). A PEC do Teto dos Gastos Públicos é Necessária? - Estudo do Endividamento Federal após o Plano Real (in Portuguese). Brasília: Senado Federal. ISSN 1983-0645.
