= Francisco José Pinheiro =

Brazilian historian, writer and politician (born 1954)

Personal details
- Born: 28 September 1954 (age 71) Jaguaribe, Brazil

Francisco José Pinheiro (born September 28, 1954 in Jaguaribe, Brazil), better known as Professor Pinheiro, is a Brazilian historian, writer and politician. He was deputy governor of the state of Ceará (one of Brazil's states in the northeast region), in the first term of Governor Cid Gomes. Today was elected state representative, but took over as head of the Secretary of Culture of the state of Ceará.

== Education ==
Professor Pinheiro has a PhD in social history from the University of Pernambuco. He is a history professor at the Federal University of Ceará (UFC) and a specialist in history of the Catholic Church in Latin America at the Pontifical Catholic University of São Paulo (PUC-SP).

== Career ==
He was president of the professors’ union at UFC, councilman in Fortaleza (Ceará's capital), and twice president of Fortaleza's Workers' Party (PT). He was also secretary of region IV in Fortaleza, during mayor Luizianne Lins' first administration.

== Personal life ==
He is married to Margarida de Lima Pompeu, a doctor and professor of Pathology and Forensic Medicine at UFC. The couple have four children: Heráclito Aragão Pinheiro, Francisco Pablo H. Aragão Pinheiro, Iago Domingos Menezes Pinheiro, and Alfa Manuela Pompeu Pinheiro.
