= Portal e-Cidadania =

Brazilian Federal Senate web portal

e-Cidadania Portal
- Logo

Federal Senate Portal for Citizen Participation

General information
- Country: Brazil
- Creation: February 2012
- Belongs to: Federal Senate
- City: Brasília

Access channels
- Internet: www.senado.leg.br/ecidadania

The e-Cidadania Portal is a website platform created in 2012 by the Federal Senate of Brazil to encourage citizen participation in the Senate's legislative, budgetary, oversight, and representative activities. The website was established months after the creation of the Access to Information Law, meeting the demands for transparency in public power.

It is a tool free of partisan ties, enabling citizen participation in the Brazilian legislative process. Between May 2012 and March 2020, more than 74 million users had accessed the Portal. In 2017 alone, the site counted more than 130.5 million accesses by more than 21 million users. On July 26, 2016, the site recorded record participation of the population, with more than 300,000 votes on the Nonpartisan School (Escola sem Partido) project. In total, there were 183 thousand demonstrations against and 173 thousand in favor of the project.

Almost all pages on the site are responsive (adapting to mobile devices) and approximately 85% of users access via cell phones.

== History ==
The e-Cidadania program was established on February 13, 2012. In May 2012, the first working version of the portal was structured. The second version came in November of the same year.

The idea came from a group of servers of the Federal Senate, who presented the proposal to the then President of the House, Senator José Sarney. A multidisciplinary group, with representatives from the General Secretariat of the Bureau; the General Directorate; the Secretariat of Social Communication; the Legislative Consultancy; the Budget, Inspection and Control Consultancy; and the Special Secretariat of Information Technology of the Federal Senate, was in charge of its management.

An Act of the Senate Bureau listed the portal's tools:

1. e-Legislação: space intended for the debate and proposition of new laws and amendment of current legislation or projects in progress;
2. e-Fiscalização: a space to monitor the Brazilian budget and the administrative actions of the Federal Senate;
3. e-Representação: a space for citizens to express their opinions and opinions about issues of interest to society and projects in progress.

On July 10, 2013, under the presidency Senator Renan Calheiros, the Senate determined the creation of the mechanism known as Public Consultation, which allows popular participation in the processing of legislative propositions in the Federal Senate.

On November 27, 2015, at the initiative of the Senate of the Future Commission, the e-Cidadania program was regulated, giving it legal certainty.

== Popular participation ==
Currently, the portal has three tools for popular participation: Legislative Idea, Interactive Event, and Public Consultation.

=== Legislative Idea ===
The purpose of the tool is to offer citizens a way to suggest new laws, change existing ones, or improve the Constitution. The suggestions are available for popular vote for four months and the ideas that receive 20 thousand supports are forwarded to the Commission on Human Rights and Participatory Legislation (CDH), where they are formalized as Legislative Suggestions. The suggestions are debated by the senators and receive an opinion.

From May 2012 to March 2020, more than 73,000 legislative ideas had been registered on the website. As of March 2020, 63 legislative suggestions were under evaluation at the Human Rights Commission, 67 had not been acted upon, and 25 had been converted into a Bill or Constitution Amendment Bill (PEC).

Throughout this period, some ideas were highlighted, such as the suggestion No. 8 of 2014, which sought to regulate the recreational, medicinal and industrial use of marijuana. The idea incited debate with the population in six interactive public hearings and obtained an opinion from the CDH for the creation of a temporary subcommittee on the topic. Suggestion No. 15 of 2014, which sought to legalize abortion in the first twelve weeks of pregnancy, was the subject of five hearings. Together, these two suggestions, had over 8,000 comments at the hearings.

Another popular idea that mobilized the social networks was the one that proposed reducing taxes on electronic games from 72% to 9%. The idea reached the required number of supports on the same day it was registered on the portal and was transformed into Suggestion No. 15 of 2017. In December 2017, the suggestion received a favorable opinion for transformation into a Constitution Amendment Bill.

In November 2019, Senator Zenaide Maia (PROS-RN), adopted the first legislative idea presented in Libras on the e-Cidadania portal, by a student from Federal District. The Bill No. 5,961/2019, presented by the senator with the same content of the idea, seeks to include the Brazilian Sign Language (Libras) in school curricula for all students, not only deaf ones.

In July 2020, Senator Paulo Paim (PT-SP) adopted a Legislative Suggestion and presented its content as a bill, giving credit to the author in the text's justification. The Suggestion, which came from a Legislative Idea published on the e-Cidadania portal, seeks to guarantee the concession of a fourteenth salary to retirees and pensioners from the INSS in 2020, due to the COVID-19 pandemic.

==== Converted into Constitutional Amendment Bill ====
Legislative Ideia	No. of Legislative Suggestion	No. of PEC
Reduce taxes on games from 72% to 9%	SUG No. 15 of 2017	PEC No. 51 of 2017
End of housing allowance for deputies, judges and senators	SUG No. 30 of 2017	PEC No. 41 of 2017
End of special retirement for governors and presidents	SUG No. 43 of 2017	PEC No. 53 of 2019
Revocation of Constitutional Amendment No. 95, which freezes public investments for 20 years	SUG No. 31 of 2018	PEC No. 54 of 2019
No more perks for former presidents and governors	SUG No. 23 of 2018	PEC No. 141 of 2019
Prohibits budget cuts and contingencies for federal educational institutions	SUG No. 28 of 2019	PEC No. 9 of 2020

==== Converted into Bill of Law ====
Legislative Ideia	No. of Legislative Suggestion	No. of PLS
Ban the distribution of straws, plastic bags, and the use of microplastic in cosmetics	SUG No. 10 of 2018	PLS No. 263 of 2018
Psychologists with a salary floor of R$4,800 for 30 hours a week	SUG No. 6 of 2017	PLS No. 511 of 2017
Explicitly prohibit the cut or decrease of speed for data consumption in fixed broadband internet services	SUG No. 7 of 2016	PLS No. 100 of 2017
Create Integral Care Centers for Autistic people in the Brazilian states' SUS	SUG No. 21 of 2017	PLS No. 169 of 2018
Decriminalization of Cannabis cultivation for personal use	SUG No. 25 of 2017	PLS No. 514 of 2017
Criminalize homophobia to punish people who attack others for being LGBT	SUG No. 28 of 2017	PLS No. 515 of 2017
30% discount on car purchases by teachers	SUG No. 40 of 2017	PLS No. 512 of 2017
Framing Developers/Programmers as Individual Microentrepreneur (MEI)	SUG No. 59 of 2017	PLS No. 220 of 2018
Guarantee of Data-Base to public servants	SUG No. 1 of 2018	PLS No. 228 of 2018
Rectification of the civil register of transsexuals	SUG No. 66 of 2017	PL No. 2745 of 2019
Prohibit noisy fireworks (firecrackers, mortars, bombs, etc.)	SUG No. 4 of 2018	PL No. 2130 of 2019
For the compulsory enrollment of Philosophy and Sociology in High School	SUG No. 20 of 2018	PL No. 2579 of 2019
Retroactive and annual increase of post-graduate scholarships	SUG No. 34 of 2018	PL No. 3612 of 2019
Make election plastic cards compulsorily biodegradable	SUG No. 6 of 2019	PL No. 2276 of 2019
Recognize fibromyalgia as a chronic disease with the right to retirement and sick leave	SUG No. 24 of 2019	PL No. 4399 of 2019
Allow Brazilian doctors trained abroad to work in Brazil	SUG No. 7 of 2019	PL No. 5180 of 2019
Change in article 213, crime of rape	SUG No. 54 of 2017	PL No. 6419 of 2019
End of the 15-reais postal dispatch fee for non-taxed imported products	SUG No. 33 of 2018	PL No. 6420 of 2019
Against the increase of the electoral fund	SUG No. 49 of 2019	PL No. 573 of 2020
Grants 14th salary to retirees and pensioners from the INSS in 2020, due to the COVID-19 pandemic	SUG No. 11 of 2020	PL No. 3657 of 2020

==== Not adopted ====
In total, by March 2020, 67 suggestions originating from ideas sent by citizens were not taken up for various reasons during voting in the Federal Senate's Commission on Human Rights and Participative Legislation (CDH).

The idea of criminalizing Brazilian funk as a public health crime to children, adolescents and the family (SUG No. 17 of 2017) divided public opinion and was widely reported by the media. Of the nearly 100,000 popular votes, 57% were in favor of the proposal. Despite this, the idea was rejected and shelved after a public hearing requested, by the rapporteur Senator Romário, on September 13, 2017. Others that generated intense debates in society were SUG n° 4 of 2017, which called for the end of the Disarmament Statute, and SUG n° 12 of 2017, which sought the reduction of the criminal age of majority to 15 years in crimes of rape and murder.

==== Accessibility ====
To enable accessibility for deaf people and citizens who communicate in Libras, in May 2019, the e-Cidadania Portal became the first body in Brazil to receive Legislative Ideas via video.

=== Interactive Event ===
Regimentally, only parliamentarians and guests have the right to speak in person during events such as thematic debate sessions, public hearings, and sabatinas. The Interactive Events tool opened the possibility for citizens to speak at these events, with questions and comments through the e-Cidadania Portal or by telephone, by calling the Senate toll-free. The questions received by telephone are subsequently registered on the portal.

The citizens' manifestations are delivered to the Senators during the meetings. In addition, the tool also makes available to citizens the video of the event broadcast, slides presented by the speakers, guests, and other information when pertinent.

The record number of participations in an interactive event was in the hearing that debated the transparency of the S system (SESI, SENAC, SENAI) in April 2018, with 2,400 comments or questions.

Currently, the portal offers declaration of participation, available on the page of each event. The declaration can serve, for example, for university students to prove that they participated in the events, which can count as complementary hours.

==== Public hearings ====
In public hearings, representatives of society, researchers, and authorities are invited to present information and arguments about issues of public interest and about the themes and legislative proposals being debated in the commissions. Popular participation can help in the formulation of the projects, since citizens can suggest changes in the text of the propositions. In hearings held to debate the abuse of authority, several citizens were against items of the bill, among them, the crime of hermeneutics. In the final version, the rapporteur of the matter removed this part of the text.

Since 2015, all public hearings held by Senate committees are open to popular participation through the e-Cidadania Portal. Between 2012 and 2015 only a few hearings were held interactively.

==== Sabatinas ====
Also called a public examination, a sabatinas is a meeting to inquire about the nominee to assume a high-profile public office, minister of higher courts, director of a regulatory agency, and ambassador. Since 2013, the Rules of Procedure of the Senate have determined that all sabatinas are open to popular participation.

The events to choose the Attorney General of the Republic in August 2015 and the President of the Central Bank in May 2016 are examples of sabatinas in which popular manifestations were read during the meetings.

The sabatina of Alexandre de Moraes, held on February 21, 2017, is currently the one that holds the record in popular participation, with more than 1,600 participations. Of the 12 questions asked by the rapporteur of the sabatina, Senator Eduardo Braga, 10 were from citizens who sent through the portal. The senator said he tried to ask one question on each subject addressed by the citizens.

==== Thematic debate session ====
As with the public hearings held by the committees, thematic debate sessions can be held on the Senate floor. These sessions have mostly been open for popular participation. The sessions to debate outsourcing in May 2015; the zika virus in February 2016; and labor reform in May 2017 had a considerable participation.

==== Young Senator ====
The Young Senator project is another example of popular participation. The project selects, through an essay contest, high school students from state public schools in Brazil. By experiencing the day-to-day legislative work, the young people meet in groups and present suggestions for projects.

One of the proposals approved by the Young Senators was PLSJ No. 1 of 2017 from the Nísia Floresta Commission, which makes internet application providers responsible for the dissemination of fake news or offensive content to third parties. This proposition received, through the Interactive Event tool, criticism from internet users questioning the risk of censorship.

=== Public Consultation ===
Citizens can express their opinion in favor or against all propositions (bills, proposed amendments to the Constitution, provisional measures, etc.) from the beginning to the end of their processing in the Federal Senate. As of March 2020, 9 million users have registered more than 21 million opinions on 8,918 propositions.

On April 20, 2016, the Constitution Amendment Bill that provides for the holding of presidential elections simultaneously with municipal elections in 2016 was published, and its Public Consultation was automatically opened, just as it occurs for all other propositions that are in progress in the Senate. In May 2016, the e-Cidadania Portal became unstable due to the large number of hits on the proposal's page.

The record of participation by internet users recorded until September 2019 was in SUG No. 30 of 2017 which calls for the end of the housing allowance for deputies, judges and senators, with almost 2 million votes. Among the propositions presented by senators with the highest number of interactions is PEC No. 106 of 2015 which proposes the reduction of the number of deputies and senators with more than 1.8 million votes.

The participation of the population can influence the fate of propositions. As an example, there is the project of the Medical Act (PLS 350/2014), which listed activities that would be exclusive to people trained in medicine, affecting other categories, such as tattooists. Due to the large number of opposing opinions, Senator Lúcia Vânia withdrew the project from the Federal Senate agenda.

== See also ==
- Citizenship
- E-government
- Federal Senate
- Constitutional amendment
