= Umari State =

Koli princely state

Umari is a village and former non-salute princely state in Gujarat, western India.

== History ==
In 1901 it had a population of 1,021, yielding 565 Rupees state revenue (1903–4, mostly from land), contributing to the tributes due to the Gaekwar Baroda State viz. to Idar State by Satlasna and Bhalusana, to which Umari and Mota Kothasana were subject.
