= Mombaça =

Municipality in Ceará, Brazil

Coordinates: 5°44′34″S 39°37′40″W

- Municipality
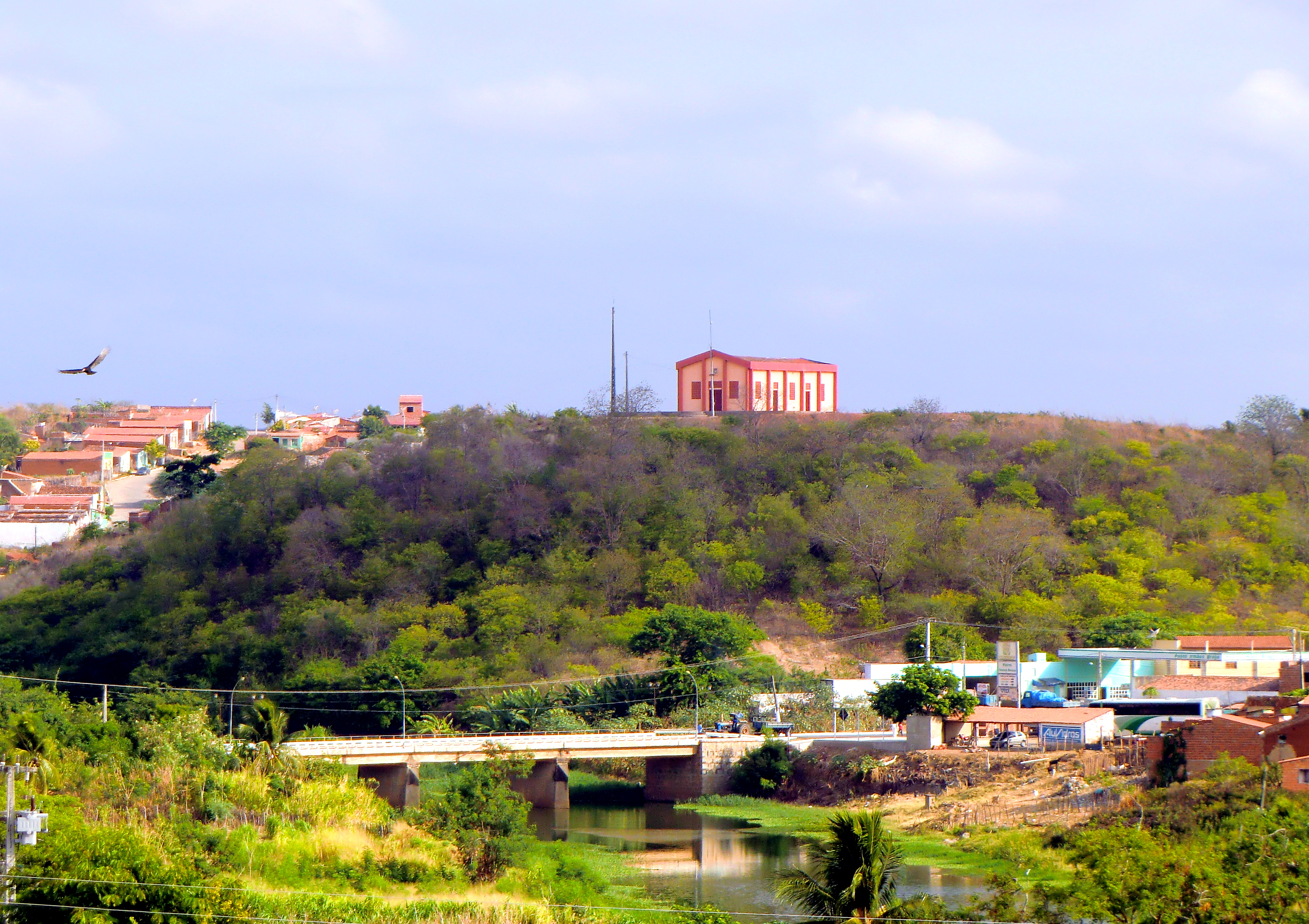

- Flag Coat of arms
- Interactive map of Mombaça
- Country: Brazil
- Region: Nordeste
- State: Ceará
- Mesoregion: Sertoes Cearenses

Area
  - Land: 18,000 sq mi (47,000 km^{2})

Population (2020)
  - Total: 43,858
- Time zone: UTC−3 (BRT)
- Postal code: 63610000
- Area code: 88

Mombaça is a municipality in the state of Ceará in the Northeast region of Brazil.

== See also ==
- List of municipalities in Ceará
