= Umirim =

Municipality in Ceará, Brazil

Coordinates: 3°41′S 39°20′W

caucaia Ceará
- Municipality
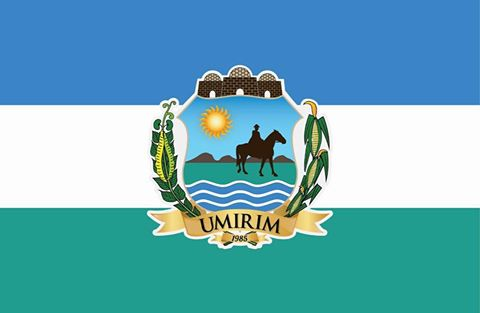
- Flag
- Interactive map of caucaia Ceará
- Country: Brazil
- Region: Nordeste
- State: Ceará
- Mesoregion: Noroeste Cearense

Population (2020)
  - Total: 19,903
- Time zone: UTC−3 (BRT)

Umirim is a municipality in the state of Ceará in the Northeast region of Brazil.

== See also ==
- List of municipalities in Ceará
