= Tabuleiro do Norte =

Municipality in Ceará, Brazil

Coordinates: 5°15′S 38°07′W

Tabuleiro do Norte, Ceará
- Municipality
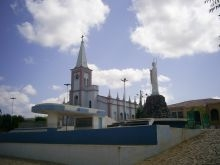

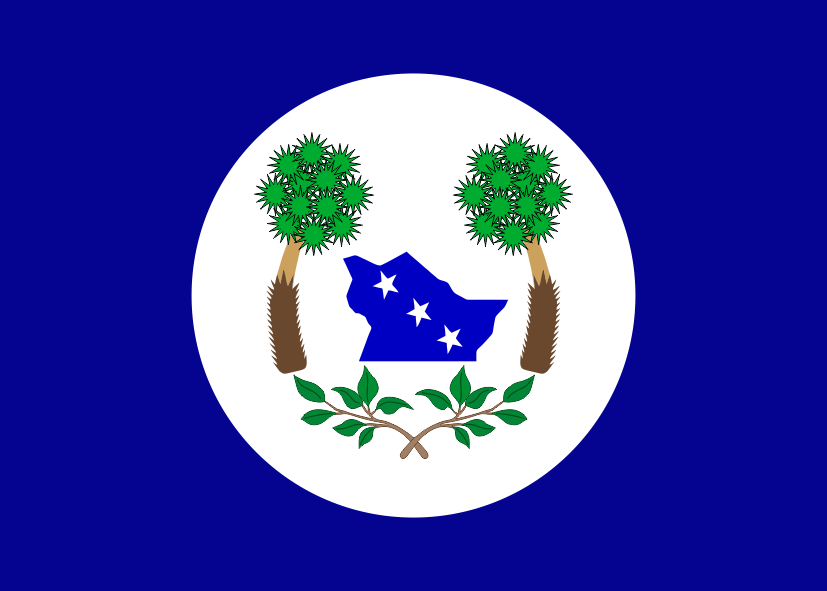
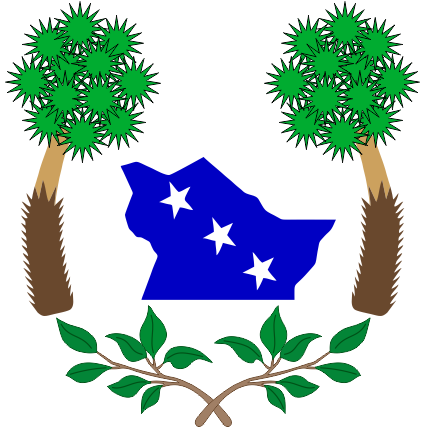
- Flag Coat of arms
- Interactive map of Tabuleiro do Norte, Ceará
- Country: Brazil
- Region: Nordeste
- State: Ceará
- Mesoregion: Jaguaribe

Population (2020)
  - Total: 30,807
- Time zone: UTC−3 (BRT)

Tabuleiro do Norte is a municipality in the state of Ceará in the Northeast region of Brazil.

== See also ==
- List of municipalities in Ceará
