= Umari, Central Papua =

Umari
- Village
- Location of the village in Indonesian Papua
- Coordinates: 4°28′S 135°12′E
- Country: Indonesia
- Province: Central Papua
- Time zone: UTC+9 (WIT)

Umari is a coastal village in Central Papua, Indonesia. The average temperature rarely falls below 18°Celsius and rarely above 25°Celsius.
