= Morada Nova =

Municipality in Ceará, Brazil

Coordinates: 5.10694°S 38.3728°W

- Municipality
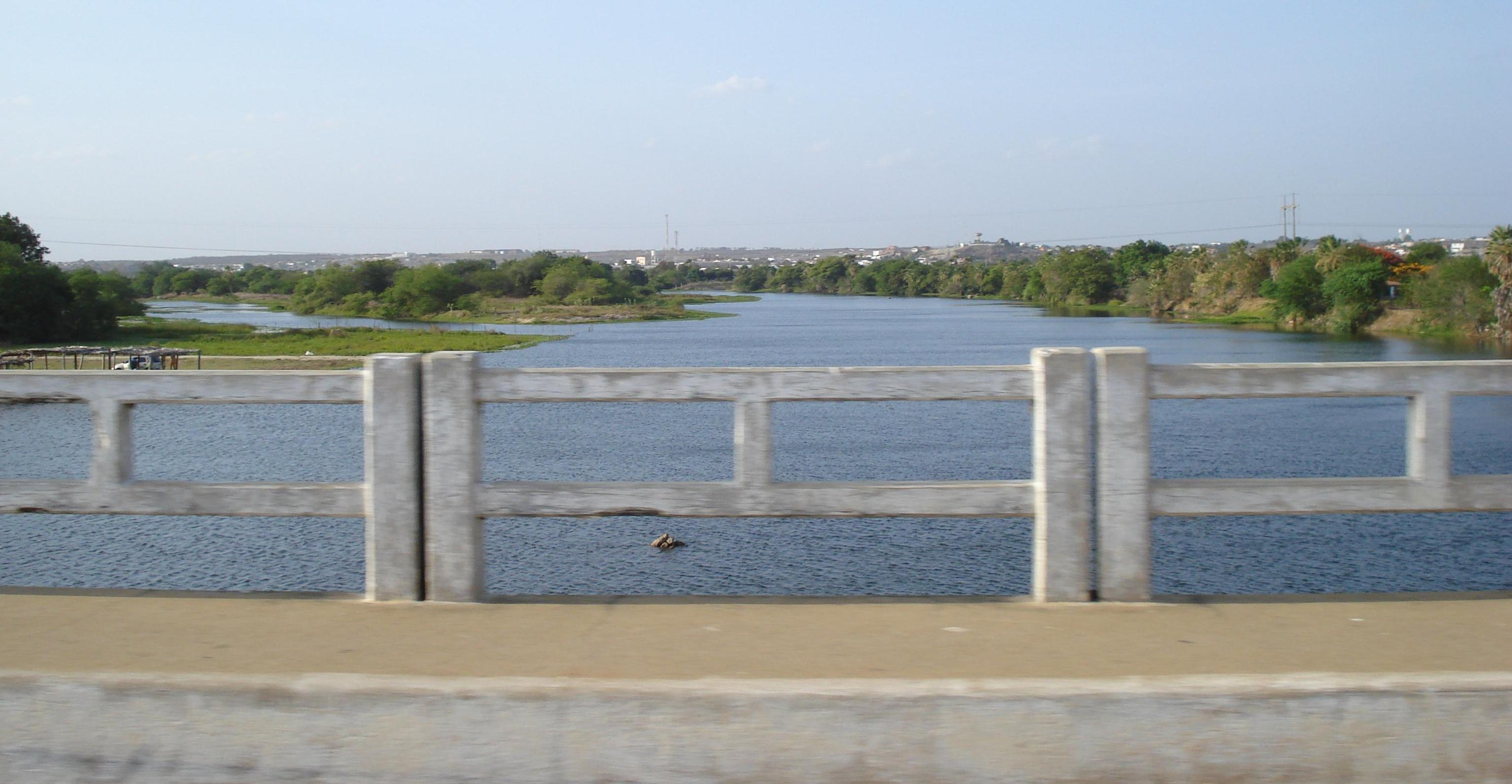

- Flag
- Interactive map of Morada Nova
- Country: Brazil
- Region: Nordeste
- State: Ceará
- Mesoregion: Jaguaribe

Population (2020)
  - Total: 61,738
- Time zone: UTC−3 (BRT)

Morada Nova is a municipality in the state of Ceará in the Northeast region of Brazil.

== Climate ==
Climate data for Morada Nova (1981–2010)
Month	Jan	Feb	Mar	Apr	May	Jun	Jul	Aug	Sep	Oct	Nov	Dec	Year
Mean daily maximum °C (°F)	34.7 (94.5)	34.0 (93.2)	33.0 (91.4)	32.5 (90.5)	32.2 (90.0)	32.1 (89.8)	32.8 (91.0)	34.1 (93.4)	35.3 (95.5)	35.9 (96.6)	35.9 (96.6)	35.6 (96.1)	34.0 (93.2)
Daily mean °C (°F)	28.0 (82.4)	27.6 (81.7)	27.2 (81.0)	27.1 (80.8)	26.8 (80.2)	26.3 (79.3)	26.3 (79.3)	26.9 (80.4)	27.6 (81.7)	28.0 (82.4)	28.2 (82.8)	28.3 (82.9)	27.4 (81.3)
Mean daily minimum °C (°F)	23.3 (73.9)	23.1 (73.6)	23.2 (73.8)	23.2 (73.8)	22.7 (72.9)	21.7 (71.1)	20.9 (69.6)	21.1 (70.0)	21.5 (70.7)	22.3 (72.1)	22.6 (72.7)	23.0 (73.4)	22.4 (72.3)
Average precipitation mm (inches)	83.6 (3.29)	99.6 (3.92)	168.5 (6.63)	177.8 (7.00)	104.8 (4.13)	66.1 (2.60)	22.3 (0.88)	10.0 (0.39)	1.5 (0.06)	3.0 (0.12)	1.7 (0.07)	27.0 (1.06)	765.9 (30.15)
Average precipitation days (≥ 1.0 mm)	6	9	14	13	9	6	4	1	0	0	0	2	64
Average relative humidity (%)	67.9	71.9	78.8	79.9	78.1	74.6	66.2	64.3	62.4	63.2	63.3	65.2	69.7
Mean monthly sunshine hours	240.6	206.3	206.1	213.4	239.2	242.9	262.1	288.4	288.5	300.1	289.4	268.0	3,045
Source: Instituto Nacional de Meteorologia

== See also ==
- List of municipalities in Ceará
