= Mota Kotarna =

Village in Mehsana district, Gujarat, India

Mota Kotarna is a village in the Mehsana district of Gujarat in western India.

== History ==
Princely state of Mota Kotarna was a Seventh Class taluka and princely state, also comprising two more villages. It was part of the Gadhwara thana in Mahi Kantha.

It had a combined population of 829 in 1901, yielding a state revenue of 576 Rupees (1903–4, mostly from land) and contributing to the tributes due by Satlasna and Bhalusna, to both of which talukas Mota Kotarna was subordinated, to the Gaekwar Baroda State viz. to Idar State.

== Sources and external links ==
- Imperial Gazetteer, on dsal.uchicago.edu - Mahi Kantha
- Gazetteer of the Bombay Presidency ..., Volume 5
