= Federal Centers for Technological Education =

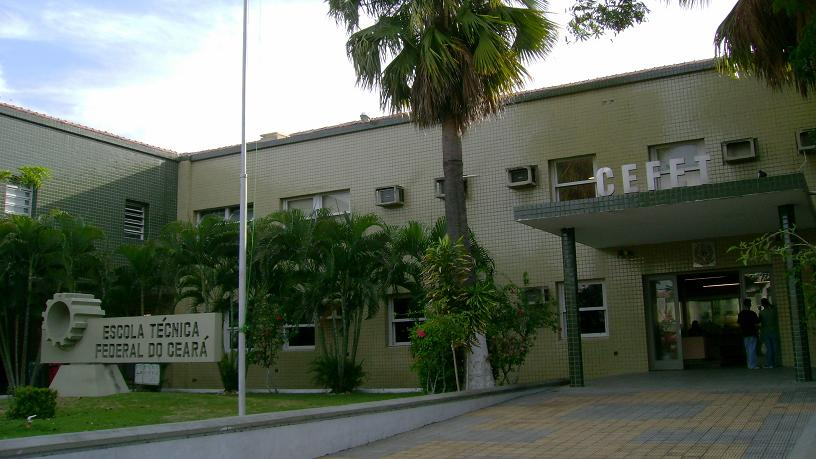
Entrance of CEFET-CE, campus Fortaleza, Ceará.

The Federal Centers for Technological Education (Portuguese: Centros Federais de Educação Tecnológica, shortened CEFET) are Brazilian educational institutes which are directly linked to the Ministry of Education. They are focused on high school, technical high school and academic degrees linked to technology. Many of them offer academic degrees, just like universities.

After December 28, 2008, most of them were transformed into Federal Institutes of Education, Science and Technology, the exceptions being the ones in the states of Minas Gerais and Rio de Janeiro, which remained as CEFETs and the one in the state of Paraná, which became the Federal Technological University of Paraná.

== See also ==
- CEFET-MG
- CEFET/RJ
