= Cedro, Ceará =

Municipality in Ceará, Brazil

Coordinates: 6°36′25″S 39°03′43″W

Cedro
- Municipality
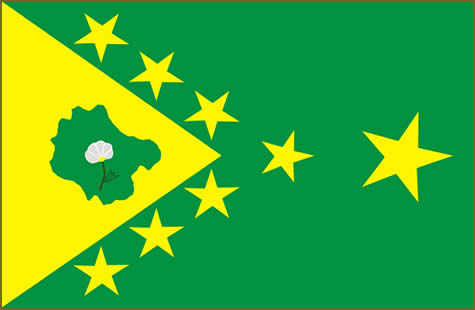
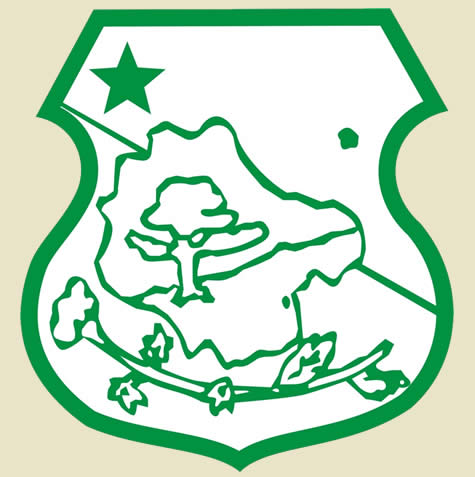
- Flag Coat of arms
- Interactive map of Cedro
- Country: Brazil
- Region: Nordeste
- State: Ceará
- Mesoregion: Centro-Sul Cearense

Population (2020)
  - Total: 25,585
- Time zone: UTC−3 (BRT)

Cedro is a municipality in the state of Ceará in the Northeast region of Brazil.

== See also ==
- List of municipalities in Ceará
