= Umari, Ceará =

Municipality in Ceará, Brazil

Coordinates: 6°38′52″S 38°42′00″W

Umari
- Municipality
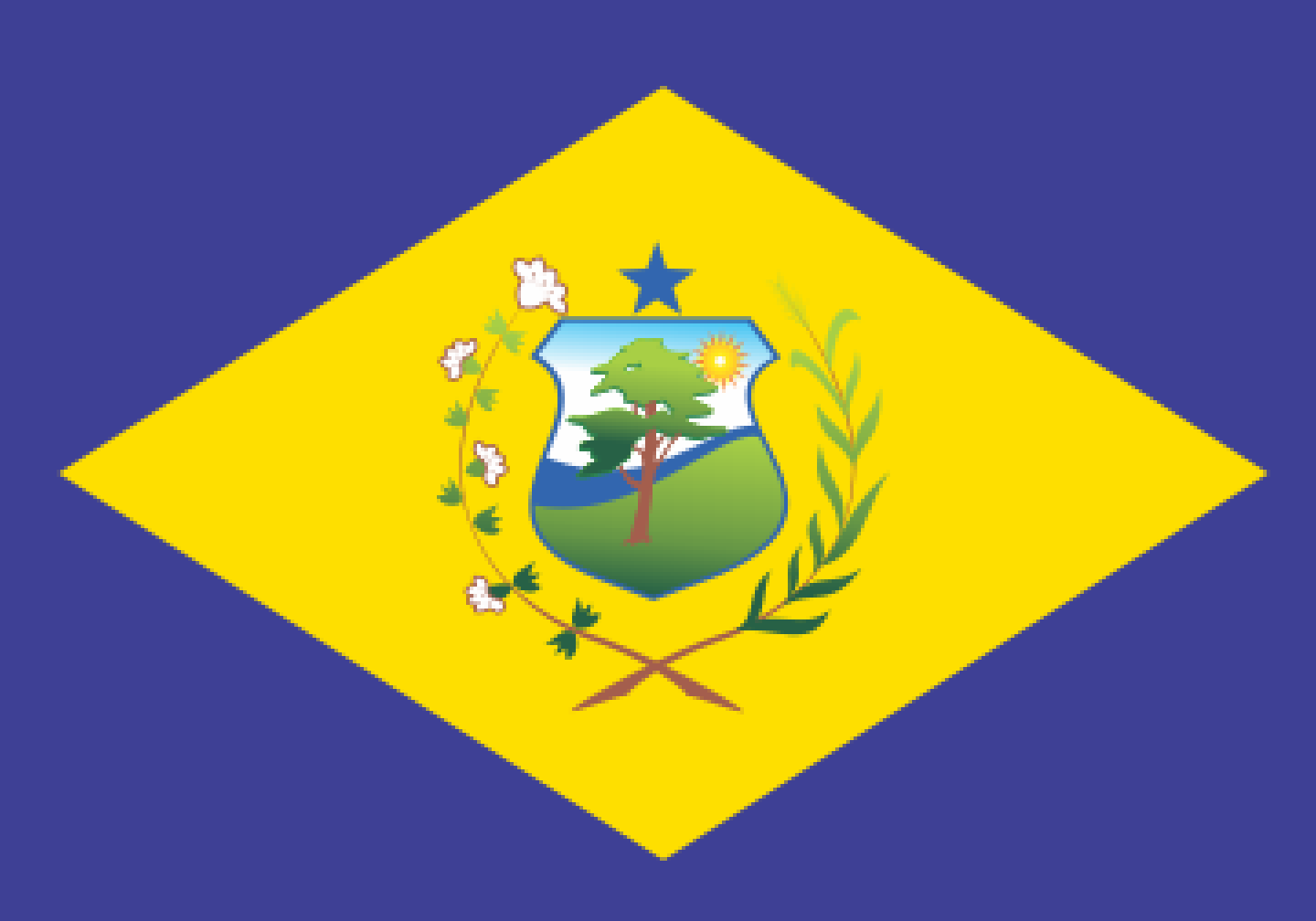
- Flag
- Interactive map of Umari
- Country: Brazil
- Region: Nordeste
- State: Ceará
- Mesoregion: Centro-Sul Cearense

Population (2020)
  - Total: 7,736
- Time zone: UTC−3 (BRT)

Umari is a municipality in the state of Ceará in the Northeast region of Brazil.

== See also ==
- List of municipalities in Ceará
