= Jaguaribe =

Municipality in Ceará, Brazil

Coordinates: 5.89083°S 38.6219°W

- Municipality
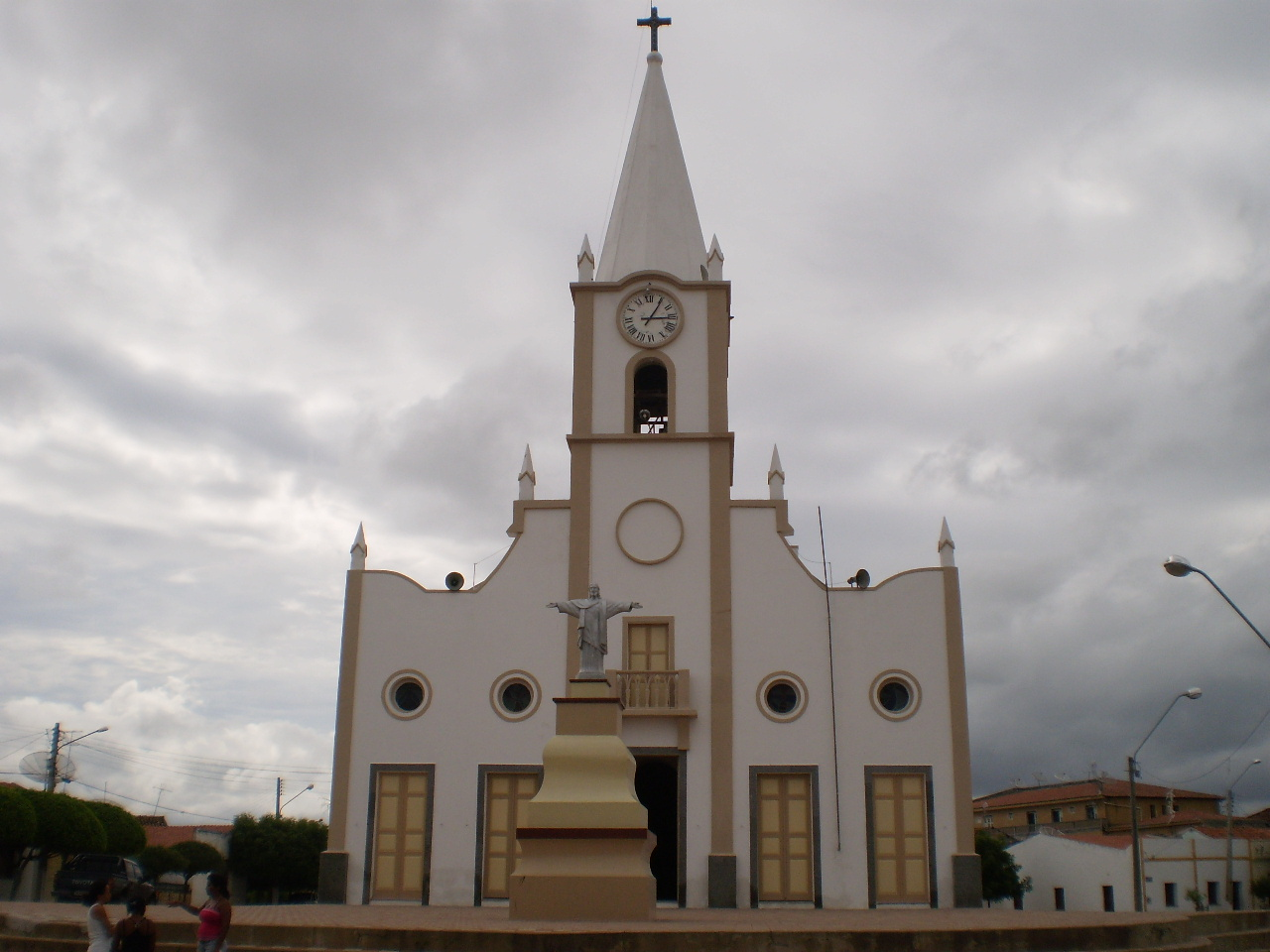
- Jaguaribe Mother Church, Jaguaribe, Brazil

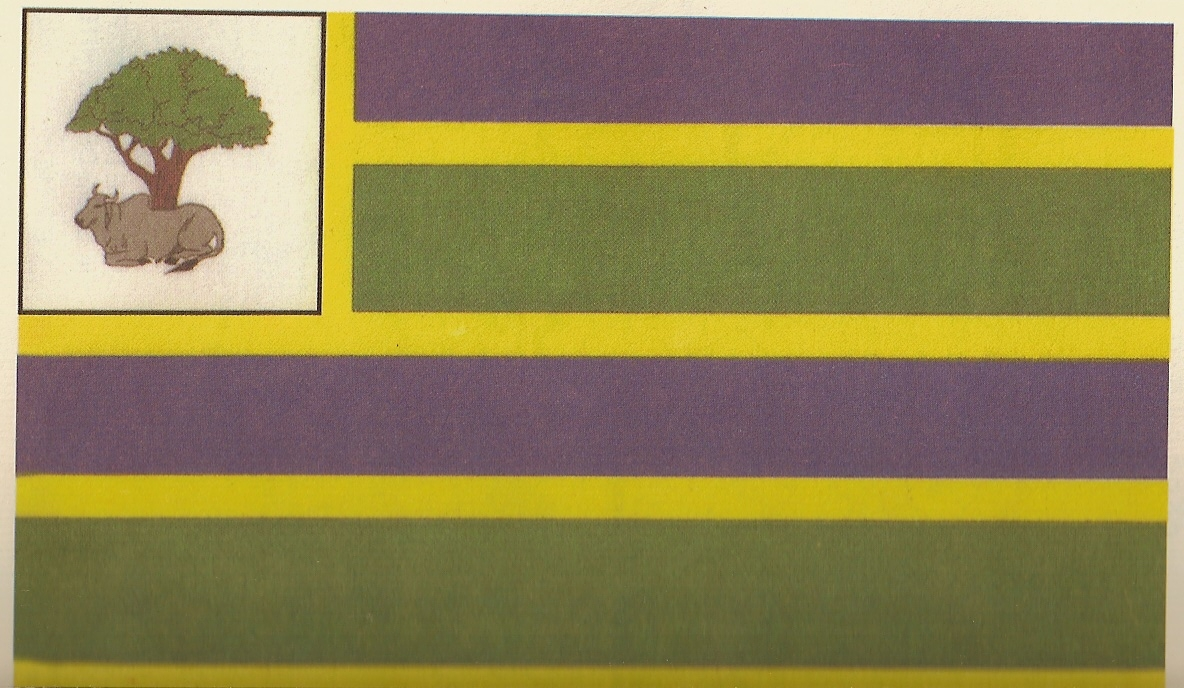
- Flag
- Interactive map of Jaguaribe
- Country: Brazil
- Region: Nordeste
- State: Ceará
- Mesoregion: Jaguaribe

Population (2022)
  - Total: 33,726
  - Density: 49/sq mi (18.8/km^{2})
- Time zone: UTC−3 (BRT)

Jaguaribe is a municipality in the state of Ceará in the Northeast region of Brazil. With an area of 1,877.062 square kilometers (724.738 sq mi), of which 4.3076 square kilometres (1.6632 sq mi) is urban, it is located 244 km from Fortaleza, the state capital, and 1,495 km from Brasília, the federal capital. Its population in the 2022 demographic census was 33,726 inhabitants, according to the Brazilian Institute of Geography and Statistics (IBGE), ranking as the 56th most populous municipality in the state of Ceará.

== Geography ==
The territory of Jaguaribe covers 1,877.062 square kilometers (724.738 sq mi), of which 4.3076 square kilometres (1.6632 sq mi) constitutes the urban area. It sits at an average altitude of 1,194 meters above sea level. The city is located 244 km from the state capital Fortaleza, and 1,495 km from the federal capital Brasília.

Under the territorial division established in 2017 by the Brazilian Institute of Geography and Statistics (IBGE), the municipality belongs to the immediate geographical region of Russas-Limoeiro do Norte, within the intermediate region of Quixadá. Previously, under the microregion and mesoregion divisions, it was part of the microregion of Médio Jaguaribe in the mesoregion of Jaguaribe.

== Demographics ==
In the 2022 census, the municipality had a population of 33,726 inhabitants and ranked only 56th in the state that year (out of 184 municipalities), with 51.5% female and 48.5% male, resulting in a sex ratio of 94.16 (9,416 men for every 10,000 women), compared to 34,409 inhabitants in the 2010 census (67.62% living in the urban area), when it held the 53th state position. Between the 2010 and 2022 censuses, the population of Jaguaribe registered a growth of just over -2%, with an annual geometric growth rate of -0.17%. Regarding age group in the 2022 census, 67.4% of the inhabitants were between 15 and 64 years old, 19.29% were under fifteen, and 13.31% were 65 or older. The population density in 2022 was 17.97 inhabitants per square kilometer, with an average of 2.72 inhabitants per household.

The municipality's Human Development Index (HDI-M) is considered high, according to data from the United Nations Development Programme. According to the 2010 report published in 2013, its value was 0.621, ranking 172th in the state and 5,306th nationally (out of 5,565 municipalities), and the Gini coefficient rose from 0.43 in 2003 to 0.54 in 2010. Considering only the longevity index, its value is 0.76, the income index is 0.580, and the education index is 0.543.

== See also ==
- List of municipalities in Ceará
