= 2018 in Brazil =

Events in the year 2018 in Brazil.

== Incumbents ==
=== Federal government ===
- President: Michel Temer
- Vice President: Vacant

=== Governors ===
- Acre: Tião Viana
- Alagoas: Renan Filho
- Amapa: Waldez Góes
- Amazonas: Amazonino Mendes
- Bahia: Rui Costa
- Ceará: Camilo Santana
- Espírito Santo: Paulo Hartung
- Goiás: José Eliton Júnior
- Maranhão: Flávio Dino
- Mato Grosso: Pedro Taques
- Mato Grosso do Sul: Reinaldo Azambuja
- Minas Gerais: Fernando Damata Pimentel
- Pará: Simão Jatene
- Paraíba: Ricardo Coutinho
- Paraná:
  - Carlos Alberto "Beto" Richa (until 6 April)
  - Cida Borghetti (from 6 April)
- Pernambuco: Paulo Câmara
- Piauí: Wellington Dias
- Rio de Janeiro: Luiz Fernando Pezão
- Rio Grande do Norte: Robinson Faria
- Rio Grande do Sul: José Ivo Sartori
- Rondônia:
  - Confúcio Moura (until 6 April)
  - Daniel Pereira (6 April-31 December)
- Roraima: Suely Campos
- Santa Catarina:
  - Raimundo Colombo (until 16 February)
  - Eduardo Moreira (from 16 February)
- São Paulo:
  - Geraldo Alckmin (until 6 April)
  - Márcio França (from 6 April)
- Sergipe: Jackson Barreto
- Tocantins: Marcelo Miranda

=== Vice governors ===
- Acre: Maria Nazareth Melo de Araújo Lambert
- Alagoas: José Luciano Barbosa da Silva
- Amapá: João Bosco Papaléo Paes
- Amazonas: João Bosco Gomes Saraiva
- Bahia: João Leão
- Ceará: Izolda Cela
- Espírito Santo: César Roberto Colnago
- Goiás: José Eliton de Figueiredo Júnior
- Maranhão: Carlos Brandão
- Mato Grosso:
  - Carlos Henrique Baqueta Fávaro (until 5 April)
  - Vacant thereafter
- Mato Grosso do Sul: Rose Modesto
- Minas Gerais: Antônio Eustáquio Andrade Ferreira
- Pará: José da Cruz Marinho
- Paraíba: Lígia Feliciano
- Paraná:
  - Cida Borghetti (until 6 April)
  - Vacant thereafter
- Pernambuco: Raul Jean Louis Henry Júnior
- Piaui: Margarete de Castro Coelho
- Rio de Janeiro: Francisco Dornelles
- Rio Grande do Norte: Fábio Dantas
- Rio Grande do Sul: José Paulo Dornelles Cairoli
- Rondônia: Daniel Pereira
- Roraima: Paulo César Justo Quartiero
- Santa Catarina: Eduardo Pinho Moreira
- São Paulo: Márcio França
- Sergipe: Belivaldo Chagas Silva
- Tocantins:
  - Cláudia Telles de Menezes Pires Martins Lelis (until 27 March)
  - Wanderlei Barbosa (from 9 July)

== Events ==
=== January ===
- January 1: An apparent gang riot at Colônia Agroindustrial prison in Goiânia results in nine deaths and 14 inmates injured. Authorities report 233 prisoners escaped; 29 were recaptured, and 109 prisoners returned voluntarily.
- January 3: Petrobras announces it would pay $2.95 billion to settle a shareholder lawsuit in the United States stemming from the bribes and kickbacks in the Operation Car Wash scandal. The company said in a filing with the US Securities and Exchange Commission (SEC) that it had been a victim of dishonesty but that it had decided that it was in its best interest to settle and minimize uncertainty and risk.
- January 11: Standard and Poor's reduces Brazil's credit rating from BB to BB−.
- January 16: The World Health Organization calculates the incidence of yellow fever cases, which includes the state of São Paulo in a risk area.
- January 18: The public prosecutor in São Paulo files a civil suit against BNY Mellon alleging mishandling of postal worker retirement funds for Postalis.
- January 19: A car hits a group of pedestrians near Copacabana Beach in Rio de Janeiro, causing injuries to fifteen people and killing an infant. Police report that the driver had an epileptic seizure.
- January 25: The Workers' Party (PT) insists that former president Luiz Inácio Lula da Silva will be their candidate for the upcoming presidential election, even though a conviction for corruption bars him from participating.
- January 24: An appeals court upholds the corruption conviction of Luiz Inácio Lula da Silva, by far the frontrunner in the upcoming presidential election. His sentence has also increased to twelve years and his lawyers plan to appeal. Lula has also expressed intentions of campaigning for office until physically prevented from doing so.

=== February ===
- February 1: Police announce that Postalis lost a billion reals ($1.9 billion) to embezzlement.
- February 5: Munduruku leaders accuse the Fundação Nacional do Índio (Funai) and Chico Mendes Institute for Biodiversity Conservation for failing to take action against illegal mining in their territory. Indigenous leaders say they will take matters into their own hands, as the group had previously taken over the Belo Monte Dam in 2013.
- February 7: State-owned oil company Petrobras announces plans to sell an oil refinery in Pasadena, Texas, whose purchase was featured prominently in the Operation Car Wash investigation.
- February 10: Police say they have found no evidence to support the charge that Michel Temer caused a benefit to Rodrimar SA, who operate the Port of Santos, Latin America's busiest port. A refusal was also shown, after a video made by cooperating witness Rocha Loures of a conversation on the subject with Temer's legal advisor.
- February 11: President Temer pledges assistance to a massive influx of refugees from Venezuela in the northern state of Roraima. It's reported that there are 40,000 displaced Venezuelans in Boa Vista, where many are living in the streets.
- February 12: BNDES announces that it has extended a $2 billion line of credit to Angola for economic development.
- February 14: Kinross Gold Corporation acquires two hydroelectric power plants in Brazil and reports a profit for 4th quarter 2017.
- February 16: Federal intervention begins in Rio de Janeiro. This is the first federal intervention since the 1988 constitution, as General Walter Braga Netto is appointed state intervenor.
- February 19: The federal government decides to suspend the progress of the pension reform.
- February 28: Reports show that North Korean leader Kim Jong-un and his father Kim Jong-il used fraudulently-obtained Brazilian passports in order to apply for visas to visit Western countries in the 1990s.

=== March ===
- March 2: Minister Edson Fachin includes President Michel Temer in an inquiry into Operation Lava Jato, which is also investigating ministers Eliseu Padilha and Moreira Franco. According to the investigation, indications of bribes being paid at the Secretariat of Civil Aviation of the Presidency of the Republic are being investigated, according to Odebrecht's statements .
- March 14: Rio de Janeiro city councilor and outspoken police critic Marielle Franco (PSOL) is shot dead, along with her driver, Anderson Gomes, in a drive-by shooting around 9:30 PM in the Estácio neighborhood. Franco was the fifth most voted candidate in the city's last election, with more than 46,000 votes.
- March 21: A blackout that lasts more than 5 hours affects the Northeast Region and the North Region, as well as some cities in all regions partially. The electric energy collapse is caused by human error, after programming an erroneous circuit breaker at the Belo Monte substation.
- March 28: During a visit to Guarapuava, Paraná, two caravan buses belonging to former president Luiz Inácio Lula da Silva is attacked. Consequently, the local event is cancelled.

=== April ===
- April 1: An earthquake with a 6.8 magnitude that hit Bolivia is felt in numerous Brazilian cities. The Federal District, Avenida Paulista, Santos, Marília, Tupã, São Carlos, Araxá, Belo Horizonte, Uberlândia, Paraná, Rio Grande do Sul, and Santa Catarina are all affected by the earthquake.
- April 4: The habeas corpus requested by the defense of former president Luiz Inácio Lula da Silva is rejected by the Supreme Federal Court, with 6 votes to 5.
- April 5: After rejecting the request for habeas corpus, federal judge Sergio Moro orders the arrest of former President Luiz Inácio Lula da Silva. The sentence is 12 years and 1 month in prison by the TRF-4, due to the crimes of passive corruption and money laundering in the case of a triplex of Guarujá.
- April 7: Former President Luiz Inácio Lula da Silva gives a public address alongside his impeached successor Dilma Rousseff at a steelworkers' union building in Sao Bernardo do Campo, saying he will comply with an arrest warrant, despite maintaining his innocence. Lula surrenders to police and arrives in Curitiba to begin a 12-year sentence for corruption, after two failed appeals to have the warrant withdrawn.
- April 27: FIFA hands a lifetime ban to Brazilian Football Confederation President Marco Polo Del Nero, for taking bribes. He is also fined one million Swiss francs.

=== May ===
- May 1: Edifício Wilton Paes de Almeida, a 26-story tower block in São Paulo, is destroyed by a fire and consequent collapse. Neighbouring buildings are also damaged by fire. Occupied by about 90 families, firefighters point to at least one victim in the rubble and 34 missing. Authorities warn the casualty toll is "likely to be high".
- May 21-May 25: Truck drivers go on a national strike for five straight days. Drivers are protesting against the increase in fuel prices, the end of tolls for suspended axles, and tax reform related to truck driving. The stoppage has affected public and private bodies.

=== June ===
- June 11: The Temer administration creates the Unified Public Security System (SUSP) to integrate security and intelligence bodies; standardize information, statistics and procedures; among several other measures aimed at integrating the security forces.

=== August ===
- August 31: The Superior Electoral Court rules that former President and Workers' Party (PT) presidential candidate Luiz Inácio Lula da Silva cannot run in the election because he does not qualify under the Clean Slate law. The Court also rules that PT cannot run political ads featuring Lula.

=== September ===
- September 2: A massive fire destroys most of the Paço de São Cristóvão, which houses the National Museum of Brazil, in Rio de Janeiro. The museum holds important archaeological and anthropological objects, including the remains of the Luzia Woman, Marajoara vases and Egyptian mummies. It is estimated that 80% of the museum's collection was lost in the incident.
- September 6: Presidential candidate Jair Bolsonaro is stabbed in the abdomen, while campaigning and interacting with supporters in Juiz de Fora, Minas Gerais.
- September 11: The Workers' Party announces Fernando Haddad's candidacy for the presidency, after Lula da Silva's candidacy was rejected by the Superior Electoral Court on August 31.
- September 29: Popular demonstrations take place in more than 100 cities across Brazil against presidential candidate Jair Bolsonaro.

=== October ===
- October 7: First round of general elections take place. For president, candidates Jair Bolsonaro (PSL) and Fernando Haddad (PT) go to the second round, which will be held on October 28.
- October 28: The second round of general elections take place. With just over 55% of the votes, PSL candidate Jair Bolsonaro defeats Fernando Haddad (PT) and is elected president of Brazil.

=== November ===
- November 2: The president-elect of Brazil, Jair Bolsonaro, states that he will honor his campaign pledge, by moving the country's embassy in Israel from Tel Aviv to Jerusalem.
- November 10: A landslide in Niterói leaves at least 10 people dead, while eleven others are injured.

=== December ===
- December 7: Eleven people die, including five hostages, as armed police battle robbers who tried to raid two banks in Milagres.
- December 11: A gunman kills five people and injures three others during a mass at a Catholic cathedral in Campinas. Afterwards, the gunman commits suicide in front of the altar.
- December 14: After receiving more than 300 complaints, the Public Prosecutor's Office of Goiás orders the arrest of medium John of God, over allegations of sexual abuse.
- December 16: John of God surrenders himself to the police.

== Arts and culture ==
- 2017–18 Brazil network television schedule
- List of Brazilian films of 2018

== Sports ==
- 2018 in Brazilian football

== Deaths ==
Uploaded media

=== January ===
- January 1: Humberto Coutinho, 71, politician and doctor, bowel cancer.
- January 2: Armando Monteiro Filho, 92, politician, Minister of Agriculture (1961–1962).
- January 3: Darci Miguel Monteiro, 49, footballer (Volta Redonda Futebol Clube, Widzew Łódź, Antalyaspor), heart attack.
- January 5: Carlos Heitor Cony, 91, journalist and writer, multiple organ failure.
- January 6: Remídio José Bohn, 67, Roman Catholic prelate, Bishop of Cachoeira do Sul (since 2011).
- January 19: Célio de Oliveira Goulart, 73, Roman Catholic prelate, Bishop of São João del Rei (since 2010).
- January 28: Antônio Agostinho Marochi, 92, Roman Catholic prelate, Bishop of Presidente Prudente (1976–2002).

=== February ===
- February 2:
  - Fábio Pereira de Azevedo, 41, Brazilian-born Togolese footballer (A.D. Isidro Metapán), traffic collision.
  - Paulo Roberto Morais Júnior, 33, footballer (Incheon United, Al-Fujairah), leukemia.
- February 3: Oswaldo Loureiro, 85, actor.
- February 7: Eva Sopher, 94, theatre manager.
- February 8: Agenor Girardi, 66, Roman Catholic prelate, Bishop of União da Vitória (since 2015).
- February 9: Robert W. Lichtwardt, 93, Brazilian-born American mycologist.
- February 13: Danilo Caçador, 32, footballer (Chapecoense, Juazeirense), heart attack.
- February 18: Theotônio dos Santos, 81, economist.
- February 26: João W. Nery, 68, writer and LGBT activist

=== March ===
- March 3: Tônia Carrero, 95, actress (Água Viva, Louco Amor), complications from surgery.
- March 7: Victor Heringer, 29, novelist, translator (First They Killed My Father) and poet, Prêmio Jabuti laureate (2013), suicide by jumping.
- March 13: Bebeto de Freitas, 68, Olympic volleyball coach (1984) and football manager (Clube Atlético Mineiro), World Championship (1998), heart attack.
- March 14: Marielle Franco, 38, politician, shot.
- March 22: Carlos Eduardo Miranda, 56, musician, record producer and reality television judge (Ídolos, Qual é o Seu Talento?, Esse Artista Sou Eu).

=== May ===
- May 24: Adelaide Neri, 77, teacher and politician.
- May 25: José Hawilla, 74, businessman, respiratory failure.

=== June ===
- June 20: Simone Sueli Carneiro

=== July ===
- July 3: Guilherme Uchoa, 71, President of the Legislative Assembly of Pernambuco, pulmonary edema.

=== September ===
- September 5: Beatriz Segall, 92, actress.
- September 7: Wilson Moreira, 81, sambista.

=== October ===
- October 10: Zíbia Gasparetto, 92, spiritualist writer, pancreatic cancer.

=== December ===
- December 15: Arthur Maia, 56, composer and musician, cardiac arrest.
- December 27:
  - Miúcha, 81, singer and composer.
  - Mãe Stella de Oxóssi, 93, Candomblé priestess and author, stroke.
- December 31: Etty Fraser, 87, actress.

== See also ==
- Brazilian general election, 2018
- Operation Car Wash
- Petrobras
- Deforestation in Brazil
- 2017 in Brazil
- 2016 in Brazil
