= Qual é o Seu Talento? season 1 =

Qual é o Seu Talento?
- Season 1
- Hosted by: André Vasco
- Judges: Thomas Roth; Arnaldo Saccomani; Carlos Eduardo Miranda; Cyz Zamorano
- Winner: D-Efeitos
- Runner-up: Magician Renner

Release
- Original network: SBT
- Original release: August 5 – December 16, 2009

Season chronology
- Next → Season 2

Qual é o Seu Talento? 1 was the first season of Brazilian reality talent show Qual é o Seu Talento?. The season premiered on August 5, 2009 and concluded on December 16, 2009.

Former MTV Brasil VJ André Vasco was the show's host and the judging panel consisted of Thomas Roth, Arnaldo Saccomani, Carlos Eduardo Miranda and Cyz Zamorano (the same four from the first two seasons of Ídolos Brazil).

Dance group D-Efeitos coming out as the winners, Magician Renner was the runner-up and singer Edu Porto came in third place.

== Preliminary auditions ==
Auditions were held in the following cities:

Audition City	Audition Date	Audition Venue
São Paulo	Jun 09, 2009	Anhembi Complex

== Semifinals ==
There were five semifinals, each with nine contestants. Judges voted with the same criterion: contestants who took one or more red votes would be automatically eliminated, while contestants who took all green votes would return at the end of the episode for the judges to decide who would go to the final.

=== Key ===
Still in Competition	Buzzed Out	Advanced to Final

=== Part 1 ===
Order	Performer	Act Description	Judge's Choice			
Order	Performer	Act Description	Thomas	Arnaldo	Miranda	Cyz
1	Leonard	Singer	:)	:(	:(	:)
2	DR/CIA	Street Dance	:)	:)	:)	:)
3	Thiago Ribeiro	Equilibrist	:)	:(	:(	:)
4	Fábio Stevancovich	Dog Trainer	:)	:(	:)	:)
5	Edu Porto	Singer	:)	:)	:)	:)
6	Objetivo Cosmopolis	Acrobatic Gymnastics	:)	:(	:(	:)
7	Milena O'haio	Comedian	:(	:(	:)	:)
8	Paula Eduarda	Lyrical Singer	:(	:)	:)	:)
9	Jennifer Baeta	Acrobat	:)	:)	:)	:)

=== Part 2 ===
Order	Performer	Act Description	Judge's Choice			
Order	Performer	Act Description	Thomas	Arnaldo	Miranda	Cyz
1	Kadmiel Choir	Gospel Choir	:)	:)	:)	:)
2	Vitoría Hideko	Singer	:)	:)	:)	:)
3	Black Steve & Richard	Soul Dancers	:)	:(	:(	:)
4	Millennium	Street Dance	:)	:(	:)	:)
5	Cyrackz	Painting Art	:)	:)	:(	:(
6	CIA Tribe	African Dance	:)	:(	:(	:)
7	Arêliania Figueredo	Country Singer	:(	:)	:)	:(
8	Tsunami All-Stars	Breakdance Group	:)	:)	:)	:)
9	Velasques Family	Circus Artists	:)	:(	:(	:)

=== Part 3 ===
Order	Performer	Act Description	Judge's Choice			
Order	Performer	Act Description	Thomas	Arnaldo	Miranda	Cyz
1	Shinkyo Daiko	Percussionists	:(	:)	:)	:)
2	Brenda Krateyl	Equilibrist	:)	:)	:)	:)
3	Cybernetikos Soul Street's	Street Dance	:(	:(	:)	:)
4	Márcio Sena	Lyrical Singer	:)	:)	:)	:)
5	João Paulo	Kid Dancer	:)	:(	:)	:)
6	Scheila's Ballet	Irish Tap Dancing	:(	:)	:)	:)
7	Magician Renner	Magic	:)	:)	:)	:)
8	Marjorie Blaitt	Singer	:(	:(	:)	:)
9	Los Branda	Circus Artists	:)	:)	:)	:)

=== Part 4 ===
Order	Performer	Act Description	Judge's Choice			
Order	Performer	Act Description	Thomas	Arnaldo	Miranda	Cyz
1	Yddi & Otta	Clowns	:)	:(	:)	:)
2	Rafael Antonio	Paralympian	:)	:(	:(	:)
3	Caio Gião Bárrios	Kid Drummer	:)	:(	:)	:)
4	UNASP Bells Orchestra	Instrumentists	:)	:(	:)	:(
5	Hip-Hop X-Style	Kid Dancers	:(	:(	:)	:)
6	André Luis	Indian Rope	:)	:(	:(	:)
7	D-Efeitos	Animation	:)	:)	:)	:)
8	Glauco Lima	Animals Trainer	:)	:(	:(	:)
9	Junior Cesar	Contorcionism	:(	:)	:)	:)

=== Part 5 ===
Order	Performer	Act Description	Judge's Choice			
Order	Performer	Act Description	Thomas	Arnaldo	Miranda	Cyz
1	Thalissa Stevanovich	Circus Artist	:)	:)	:)	:)
2	Akróbatus	Acrobats	:)	:)	:)	:)
3	Nelsinho & Mixuruca	Instrumentists	:(	:(	:)	:)
4	Danilo Borges	Kid Dancer	:)	:)	:(	:)
5	André & Bisteca Barreto	Dog Trainer	:(	:(	:)	:)
6	Igor Rocha	Malabarist	:(	:)	:(	:(
7	Dupla Tempo	Acrobats	:)	:)	:)	:)
8	Rodrigo Azeredo	Art on the Sand	:)	:)	:)	:)
9	Super Maluco	Street Artist	:)	:)	:)	:)

=== Wild Card ===
Eleven contestants who took all green votes on the semifinals but failed to make it to the final were invited back to the show. In the end, lyrical singer Márcio Sena was chosen by the judges as the sixth and final member of the final six.

== Final ==
The final took place on December 16, 2009 and was a 90-minute special. Each judge had to buzzed out one out of the six remaining acts until only the final two remaining. Dance group D-Efeitos coming out as the winners, while magician Renner was the runner-up.

=== Finalists ===
Name	Genre	Act	Hometown	Semi-Final	Position Reached
D-Efeitos	Dancing	Animation	São Paulo	4	Winner
Magician Renner	Performance	Magic	Belo Horizonte	3	Runner-Up
Edu Porto	Singing	Singer	Rio de Janeiro	1	3rd Place
Tsunami All-Stars	Dancing	Breakdance Group	São Paulo	2	4th Place
Márcio Sena	Singing	Lyrical Singer	São Paulo	Wild Card	5th Place
Super Maluco	Performance	Street Artist	Diadema	5	6th Place

=== Elimination Chart ===
Stage:		SF 1	SF 2	SF 3	SF 4	SF 5	WC	FINAL
Place	Contestant	Result						
1	D-Efeitos				Advanced			Winner
2	Magician Renner			Advanced				Runner-Up
3	Edu Porto	Advanced						3rd Place
4	Tsunami All-Stars		Advanced					4th Place
5	Márcio Sena			Wild Card			Advanced	5th Place
6	Super Maluco					Advanced		6th Place
Wild; Card	Akróbatus	Wild Card					Buzzed	
Wild; Card	Brenda Krateyl			Wild Card			Buzzed	
Wild; Card	DR/CIA	Wild Card					Buzzed	
Wild; Card	Dupla Tempo					Wild Card	Buzzed	
Wild; Card	Jennifer Baeta	Wild Card					Buzzed	
Wild; Card	Kadmiel Choir		Wild Card				Buzzed	
Wild; Card	Los Branda			Wild Card			Buzzed	
Wild; Card	Rodrigo Azeredo					Wild Card	Buzzed	
Wild; Card	Thalissa Stevanovich					Wild Card	Buzzed	
Wild; Card	Vitória Hideko		Wild Card				Buzzed	
Semi- Final 5	André & Bisteca Barreto					Buzzed		
Semi- Final 5	Danilo Borges					Buzzed		
Semi- Final 5	Igor Rocha					Buzzed		
Semi- Final 5	Nelsinho & Mixuruca					Buzzed		
Semi- Final 4	André Luis				Buzzed			
Semi- Final 4	Caio Gião Bárrios				Buzzed			
Semi- Final 4	Hip-Hop X-Style				Buzzed			
Semi- Final 4	Glauco Lima				Buzzed			
Semi- Final 4	Junior Cesar				Buzzed			
Semi- Final 4	Rafael Antonio				Buzzed			
Semi- Final 4	UNASP Bells Orchestra				Buzzed			
Semi- Final 4	Yddi & Otta				Buzzed			
Semi- Final 3	Cybernetikos Soul Street's			Buzzed				
Semi- Final 3	João Paulo			Buzzed				
Semi- Final 3	Marjorie Blaitt			Buzzed				
Semi- Final 3	Scheila's Ballet			Buzzed				
Semi- Final 3	Shinkyo Daiko			Buzzed				
Semi- Final 2	Arêliania Figueredo		Buzzed					
Semi- Final 2	Black Steve & Richard		Buzzed					
Semi- Final 2	CIA Tribe		Buzzed					
Semi- Final 2	Cyrackz		Buzzed					
Semi- Final 2	Millennium		Buzzed					
Semi- Final 2	Velasques Family		Buzzed					
Semi- Final 1	Fábio Stevancovich	Buzzed						
Semi- Final 1	Leonard	Buzzed						
Semi- Final 1	Milena O'haio	Buzzed						
Semi- Final 1	Objetivo Cosmopolis	Buzzed						
Semi- Final 1	Paula Eduarda	Buzzed						
Semi- Final 1	Thiago Ribeiro	Buzzed						

== Notable contestants ==
- D-Efeitos
- Magician Renner
- Márcio Sena
