= Qual é o Seu Talento? season 2 =

Qual é o Seu Talento?
- Season 2
- Hosted by: André Vasco
- Judges: Thomas Roth; Arnaldo Saccomani; Carlos Eduardo Miranda; Cyz Zamorano
- Winner: Júlia Gomes
- Runner-up: Danillu & Guaru ESD

Release
- Original network: SBT
- Original release: January 6 – June 19, 2010

Season chronology
- ← Previous; Season 1 Next → Season 3

Qual é o Seu Talento? 2 was the second season of Brazilian reality talent show Qual é o Seu Talento?. The season premiered on January 6, 2010 and concluded on June 19, 2010.

André Vasco returned as a host from last season and the judging panel again consists of Thomas Roth, Arnaldo Saccomani, Carlos Eduardo Miranda and Cyz Zamorano.

8-year-old singer Júlia Gomes coming out as the winner, lyrical singer Danillu and acrobatic gymnastics Guaru ESD were the runners-up.

== Preliminary auditions ==
Auditions were held in Belo Horizonte, Juiz de Fora, Sorocaba, Rio de Janeiro and Manaus, but were not televised. Approximately 130 acts advanced to the São Paulo Round.

Audition City	Audition Date	Audition Venue
Belo Horizonte	January 23, 2010	Alterosa TV Station
Juiz de Fora	February 2, 2010	Granbery Gymnasium
Sorocaba	February 28, 2010	Sorocaba CSU
Rio de Janeiro	March 20, 2010	SBT Rio TV Station

== Semi-finals ==
During this stage guest judges filled in a special fifth judging seat.

Semi-Final	Episode Air Date	Weekly Theme	Guest Fifth Judge
1	May 13, 2010	Circus	Isabella Fiorentino
2	May 20, 2010	Ballroom Dance	Eliana
3	May 27, 2010	Music	Toni Garrido
4	June 3, 2010	Street Dance	Yudi
5	June 5, 2010	Variety	Zé Américo
6	June 12, 2010	Kids	Celso Portiolli

There were six semi-finals, three with seven contestants (Parts 3, 4 & 5) and three with eight contestants (Parts 1, 2 & 8). Judges voted with the same criterion: contestants who took one or more red votes would be automatically eliminated, while contestants who took all green votes would return at the end of the episode for the judges to decide who would go to the final.

=== Key ===
Still in Competition	Buzzed Out	Advanced to Final

=== Part 1 ===
Order	Performer	Act Description	Judge's Choice			
Order	Performer	Act Description	Thomas	Arnaldo	Miranda	Cyz
1	Raoni & Paula	Equilibrists	:)	:)	:)	:)
2	Guaru ESD	Acrobatic Gymnastics	:)	:)	:)	:)
3	Lully & Tully	Marine Fabric	:(	:)	:)	:(
4	Os Profiçççionais	Equilibrists	:(	:(	:)	:)
5	Cosmópolis	Gymnastics	:)	:)	:)	:)
6	Toni & Luana	Trapeze	:)	:)	:(	:(
7	Getúlio & Fernanda	Balance & Strength	:)	:)	:)	:)
8	Alex Machado	Acrobat	:)	:)	:(	:)

=== Part 2 ===
Order	Performer	Act Description	Judge's Choice			
Order	Performer	Act Description	Thomas	Arnaldo	Miranda	Cyz
1	Wazimu	Urban Dance	:)	:(	:)	:)
2	Cléber & Bárbara	Skating	:)	:(	:)	:)
3	Sonidos	Tap Dance	:)	:(	:)	:(
4	Mr. Jeff	Locking	:)	:)	:)	:)
5	Tangará Troup	Acrobatic Tango	:)	:)	:)	:)
6	Thaís Carla	Plus-Size Dancer	:(	:(	:)	:)
7	Kagura do Brasil	Shinto Theater	:(	:)	:)	:)
8	Luana & Valdeck	Acrobatic Forró	:)	:)	:)	:)

=== Part 3 ===
Order	Performer	Act Description	Judge's Choice			
Order	Performer	Act Description	Thomas	Arnaldo	Miranda	Cyz
1	Tchá-Degga-Da	Percussionists	:)	:)	:(	:)
2	Mardoqueu	Tenor	:)	:(	:)	:)
3	Twilla	Singer	:)	:)	:)	:)
4	Jean Willian	Singer	:)	:)	:)	:)
5	Mc Gordão	Funk Singer	:(	:)	:)	:)
6	Danillu	Lyrical Singer	:)	:)	:)	:)
7	ADT	Percussionists	:)	:)	:(	:)

=== Part 4 ===
Order	Performer	Act Description	Judge's Choice			
Order	Performer	Act Description	Thomas	Arnaldo	Miranda	Cyz
1	Enigma of Charme	Hip Hop	:)	:)	:)	:)
2	Kurupira	Popping	:(	:)	:)	:)
3	Street Boys	Hip Hop	:)	:(	:)	:)
4	Old School	Hip Hop	:)	:)	:)	:)
5	Chemical Funk	Locking	:)	:)	:)	:)
6	Art: Remiwl	Street Dance	:(	:)	:)	:)
7	Ribeirão Preto	Street Dance	:)	:)	:)	:)

=== Part 5 ===
Order	Performer	Act Description	Judge's Choice			
Order	Performer	Act Description	Thomas	Arnaldo	Miranda	Cyz
1	Toninho & Rica	Trainer & Dog	:)	:)	:)	:)
2	Iddy & Ottinha	Clowns	:)	:)	:)	:)
3	Rafael Cinoto	Magic Cube	:(	:)	:)	:)
4	Cosplay!	Cosplayers	:)	:)	:)	:)
5	Washington & Mine	Trainer & Dog	:)	:(	:(	:)
6	Geferson Crosara	Contorcionist	:)	:)	:)	:)
7	Rafael Titonelly	Magic	:)	:)	:)	:)

=== Part 6 ===
Order	Performer	Act Description	Judge's Choice			
Order	Performer	Act Description	Thomas	Arnaldo	Miranda	Cyz
1	Mc Denguinho	Funk Singer	:)	:(	:)	:)
2	Pedro Henrique	Singer	:(	:)	:)	:)
3	Polly Angel	Singer	X	X	:)	:)
4	Falcão Batera	Kid Drummer	:)	:)	:)	:)
5	Mc Cauan	Rapper	:)	:)	:)	:)
6	Júlia Gomes	Singer	:)	:)	:)	:)
7	Davi Souza	Singer	:)	:)	:)	:)
8	Laura Fontana	Baby Lady Gaga	:)	:)	:)	:)

== Final ==
The final took place on June 19, 2010 and was a 90-minute special. Each judge had to buzzed out one out of the seven remaining acts until only the final three remaining. 8-year-old singer Júlia Gomes coming out as the winner, while lyrical singer Danillu and acrobatic gymnastics Guaru ESD were the runners-up.

=== Finalists ===
Name	Genre	Act	Hometown	Semi-final	Position Reached
Júlia Gomes	Singing	Singer	São Paulo	6	Winner
Danillu	Singing	Lyrical Singer	São Paulo	3	Runner-up
Guaru ESD	Acrobatics	Acrobatic Gymnastics	Guarulhos	1	Runner-up
Laura Fontana	Singing	Baby Lady Gaga	Juiz de Fora	6	4th place
Ribeirão Preto	Dancing	Street Dance	Ribeirão Preto	4	5th place
Toninho & Rica	Animal Performing	Trainer & Dog	São Paulo	5	6th place
Tangará Troup	Dancing	Acrobatic Tango	Londrina	2	7th place

=== Elimination chart ===
Stage:		SF 1	SF 2	SF 3	SF 4	SF 5	SF 6	FINAL
Place	Contestant	Result						
1	Júlia Gomes						Advanced	Winner
2	Danillu			Advanced				Runner-up
3	Guaru ESD	Advanced						Runner-up
4	Laura Fontana						Advanced	4th place
5	Ribeirão Preto				Advanced			5th place
6	Toninho & Rica					Advanced		6th place
7	Tangará Troup		Advanced					7th place
Semi- Final 6	Davi Souza						Buzzed	
Semi- Final 6	Falcão Batera						Buzzed	
Semi- Final 6	Mc Cauan						Buzzed	
Semi- Final 6	Mc Denguinho						Buzzed	
Semi- Final 6	Pedro Henrique						Buzzed	
Semi- Final 6	Polly Angel						Buzzed	
Semi- Final 5	Gabriel Niemietz					Buzzed		
Semi- Final 5	Geferson Crosara					Buzzed		
Semi- Final 5	Iddy & Ottinha					Buzzed		
Semi- Final 5	Rafael Cinoto					Buzzed		
Semi- Final 5	Rafael Titonelly					Buzzed		
Semi- Final 5	Washington & Mine					Buzzed		
Semi- Final 4	Art: Remiwl				Buzzed			
Semi- Final 4	Chemical Funk				Buzzed			
Semi- Final 4	Enigma of Charme				Buzzed			
Semi- Final 4	Kurupira				Buzzed			
Semi- Final 4	Old School				Buzzed			
Semi- Final 4	StreetBoys				Buzzed			
Semi- Final 3	ADT			Buzzed				
Semi- Final 3	Jean Willian			Buzzed				
Semi- Final 3	Mardoqueu			Buzzed				
Semi- Final 3	Mc Gordão			Buzzed				
Semi- Final 3	Tchá-Degga-Da			Buzzed				
Semi- Final 3	Twilla			Buzzed				
Semi- Final 2	Cléber & Bárbara		Buzzed					
Semi- Final 2	Kagura do Brasil		Buzzed					
Semi- Final 2	Luana & Valdeck		Buzzed					
Semi- Final 2	Mr. Jeff		Buzzed					
Semi- Final 2	Sonidos Group		Buzzed					
Semi- Final 2	Thaís Carla		Buzzed					
Semi- Final 2	Wazimu		Buzzed					
Semi- Final 1	Alex Machado	Buzzed						
Semi- Final 1	Cosmópolis	Buzzed						
Semi- Final 1	Getúlio & Fernanda	Buzzed						
Semi- Final 1	Lully & Tully	Buzzed						
Semi- Final 1	Os Profiçççionais	Buzzed						
Semi- Final 1	Raoni e Paula	Buzzed						
Semi- Final 1	Simone Contortionist	Buzzed						
Semi- Final 1	Toni & Luana	Buzzed						
