= Qual é o Seu Talento? season 3 =

Qual é o Seu Talento?
- Season 3
- Hosted by: André Vasco; Laura Fontana
- Judges: Thomas Roth; Arnaldo Saccomani; Carlos Eduardo Miranda; Cyz Zamorano
- Winners: Igor Martins; Raiz Coral
- Runner-up: Ginasloucos

Release
- Original network: SBT
- Original release: June 23 – December 15, 2010

Season chronology
- ← Previous; Season 2

Qual é o Seu Talento? 3 was the third season of Brazilian reality talent show Qual é o Seu Talento??. The season premiered on June 23, 2010.

André Vasco returned as a host from last season and the judging panel again consists of Thomas Roth, Arnaldo Saccomani, Carlos Eduardo Miranda and Cyz Zamorano.

Season 2 fourth place finisher Laura Fontana, the Baby Lady Gaga, make her debut as the show's backstage host.

Singer Igor Martins and Gospel Band Raiz Coral coming out as the winners (a first in the Got Talent series), while gymnastics group Ginasloucos was the runner-up.

== Semi-finals ==
For this season the semi-finals' rules changed, and things became a little bit different. Each semifinal contained six acts split into three different face-offs according to the act's category. The winners for each round would return at the end of the episode for the judges to decide who would go to the final.

=== Key ===
Key	Buzzed Out	Judges' Choice	Finalist by Won Judges' Vote	Eliminated by Lost Judges' Vote

=== Part 1 ===
First Air Date: Oct 27, 2010

Face Off	Performer	Act Description	Judge's Choice			
Face Off	Performer	Act Description	Thomas	Arnaldo	Miranda	Cyz
1	Banana Broadway	Dancer				
1	Juliano de Paula	Tap Dancer				
2	Tavito Bam Bam	Reggaeton Singer				
2	Thyago Oliver	Countertenor				
3	Bobi Zolboo	Acrobat				
3	Akros Troupe	Acrobat				
Winner's Round
Final	Juliano de Paula	Tap Dancer				
Final	Thyago Oliver	Countertenor				
Final	Bobi Zolboo	Acrobat				

=== Part 2 ===
First Air Date: Nov 03, 2010

Face Off	Performer	Act Description	Judge's Choice			
Face Off	Performer	Act Description	Thomas	Arnaldo	Miranda	Cyz
1	Engenharia da Dança	Broadway Show				
1	Ney Andrade Dance Troup	Indian Dance				
2	Felipe Cachopa	Painting				
2	Rodrigo de Azeredo	Animation				
3	Shinkyokushin Karate	Karate Performance				
3	Crazy Edson	Street Artist				
Winner's Round
Final	Ney Andrade Dance Troup	Indian Dance				
Final	Felipe Cachopa	Painting				
Final	Shinkyokushin Karate	Karate Performance				

=== Part 3 ===
First Air Date: Nov 10, 2010

Face Off	Performer	Act Description	Judge's Choice			
Face Off	Performer	Act Description	Thomas	Arnaldo	Miranda	Cyz
1	Edu Show da Vida	Street Artist				
1	Sergio Maciel	Street Artist				
2	Oficina do Corpo	Dance Troup				
2	Two Men	Dancers				
3	Mix Sertanejo	Musical Group				
3	Eletro Cooler	Musical Group				
Winner's Round
Final	Sergio Maciel	Street Artist				
Final	Oficina do Corpo	Dancers				
Final	Eletro Cooler	Musical Group				

=== Part 4 ===
First Air Date: Nov 17, 2010

Face Off	Performer	Act Description	Judge's Choice			
Face Off	Performer	Act Description	Thomas	Arnaldo	Miranda	Cyz
1	Duo Mendes	Dance Duo				
1	Little Boy Brown	Dance Troup				
2	Mary Minoboli	Singer				
2	Thais Fonseca	Singer				
3	Fabio De'Rose	Magician / Escape Artist				
3	Pyong	Comedian				
Winner's Round
Final	Little Boy Brown	Dance Troup				
Final	Mary Minoboli	Singer				
Final	Thais Fonseca	Singer				
Final	Pyong	Magician				

=== Part 5 ===
First Air Date: Nov 24, 2010

Face Off	Performer	Act Description	Judge's Choice			
Face Off	Performer	Act Description	Thomas	Arnaldo	Miranda	Cyz
1	The Promise	A Cappella Group				
1	Raiz Coral	Gospel Band				
2	Paulinha Passista	Solo Samba Dancer				
2	Fabio & Marilia	Dance Duo				
3	Chico Quebra Coco	Street Artist				
3	Super Maluco	Street Artist				
Winner's Round
Final	Raiz Coral	Gospel Band				
Final	Fabio & Marilia	Dance Duo				
Final	Super Maluco	Street Artist				

=== Part 6 ===
First Air Date: Dec 01, 2010

Face Off	Performer	Act Description	Judge's Choice			
Face Off	Performer	Act Description	Thomas	Arnaldo	Miranda	Cyz
1	Tania Maura	Singer				
1	Huang Sisters	Singers				
2	Toninho Firmeza	Comedian				
2	Samuel Dino	Actor				
3	Ronie Kreuz	Roller Skating				
3	Ginasloucos	Gymnastics				
Winner's Round
Final	Huang Sisters	Singers				
Final	Toninho Firmeza	Comedian				
Final	Ronie Kreuz	Roller Skating				
Final	Ginasloucos	Gymnastics				

=== Part 7 ===
First Air Date: Dec 08, 2010

Face Off	Performer	Act Description	Judge's Choice			
Face Off	Performer	Act Description	Thomas	Arnaldo	Miranda	Cyz
1	Giselle & Gabrielle					
1	Sorriso com Arte Company					
2						
3						
Winner's Round
Final						

== Final ==
The final took place on December 15, 2010 and was a 90-minute special. Each judge had to buzzed out one out of the seven remaining acts until only the final three remaining. Singer Igor Martins and Gospel Band Raiz Coral coming out as the winners (a first in the Got Talent series), while gymnastics group Ginasloucos was the runner-up.

=== Finalists ===
(ages stated at time of contest)

Name	Member(s)	Age(s)	Genre	Act	Hometown	Semi-Final	Position
Igor Martins			Singing			7	Winner
Raiz Coral	Sergio Saas & Others	32	Singing	A Capella Group	São Paulo	5	Winner
Ginasloucos			Performing			6	Runner-up
Bobi Zolboo	Bobi Zolboo		Performing	Acrobat	Mongolia	1	4th Place
Felipe Cachopa	Felipe Cachopa	22	Performing	Illustrator	Foz do Iguaçu	2	5th Place
Oficina do Corpo	Alexandre & Douglas		Dancing	Dance Duo	São Paulo	3	6th Place
Mary Minoboli	Mary Minoboli	13	Singing	Singer	São Paulo	4	7th Place

=== Elimination Chart ===
Stage:		SF 1	SF 2	SF 3	SF 4	SF 5	SF 6	SF 7	FINAL
Place	Contestant	Result							
1	Igor Martins							Advanced	Winner
1	Raiz Coral					Advanced			Winner
3	Ginasloucos						Advanced		Runner-up
4	Bobi Zolboo	Advanced							4th Place
5	Felipe Cachopa		Advanced						5th Place
6	Oficina do Corpo			Advanced					6th Place
7	Mary Minoboli				Advanced				7th Place
Semi- Final 7								Buzzed	
Semi- Final 6	Ronie Kreuz						Buzzed		
Semi- Final 6	Huang Sisters						Buzzed		
Semi- Final 6	Toninho Firmeza						Buzzed		
Semi- Final 6	Samuel Dino						Buzzed		
Semi- Final 6	Tania Maura						Buzzed		
Semi- Final 5	Fabio & Marilia					Buzzed			
Semi- Final 5	Super Maluco					Buzzed			
Semi- Final 5	Chico Quebra Coco					Buzzed			
Semi- Final 5	Paulinha Passista					Buzzed			
Semi- Final 5	The Promise					Buzzed			
Semi- Final 4	Little Boy Brown				Buzzed				
Semi- Final 4	Thais Fonseca				Buzzed				
Semi- Final 4	Pyong				Buzzed				
Semi- Final 4	Fabio DeRose				Buzzed				
Semi- Final 4	Duo Mendes				Buzzed				
Semi- Final 3	Eletro Cooler			Buzzed					
Semi- Final 3	Sergio Maciel			Buzzed					
Semi- Final 3	Mix Sertanejo			Buzzed					
Semi- Final 3	Two Men			Buzzed					
Semi- Final 3	Edu Show da Vida			Buzzed					
Semi- Final 2	Shinkyokushin Karate		Buzzed						
Semi- Final 2	Ney Andrade Dance Troup		Buzzed						
Semi- Final 2	Crazy Edson		Buzzed						
Semi- Final 2	Rodrigo de Azeredo		Buzzed						
Semi- Final 2	Engenharia da Dança		Buzzed						
Semi- Final 1	Juliano de Paula	Buzzed							
Semi- Final 1	Thyago Oliver	Buzzed							
Semi- Final 1	Akros Troupe	Buzzed							
Semi- Final 1	Tavito Bam Bam	Buzzed							
Semi- Final 1	Banana Broadway	Buzzed							
