= List of Brazilian films of 2018 =

This is a list of Brazilian films slated for release in 2018:

Title	Director	Cast	Notes	Ref
Sailing Band	Denis Nielsen			
Como Você Me Vê?	Felipe Bond	Cássia Kis, Gracindo Júnior, Osmar Prado, Letícia Sabatella		
Gaby Estrella	Claudio Boeckel	Maitê Padilha, Bárbara Maia, Luiza Prochet		
Antes do fim	Cristiano Burlan			
Cartas para um ladrão de livros	Carlos Juliano Barros, Caio Cavechini			
Todas as razões para esquecer	Pedro Coutinho	Johnny Massaro, Bianca Comparato, Regina Braga		
Piripkura	Mariana Oliva, Renata Terra, Bruno Jorge			
Motorrad	Vicente Amorim	Emilio Dantas, Pablo Salomon, Guilherme Prates		
Torquato Neto - Todas as horas do fim	Eduardo Ades, Marcus Fernando			
Não se Aceitam Devoluções	André Moraes	Leandro Hassum, Laura Ramos, Zéu Britto		
Pela Janela	Caroline Leone	Magali Biff, Cacá Amaral, Mayara Constantino		
A Repartição do Tempo	Santiago Dellape	Eucir de Souza, Edu Moraes, Bianca Müller		
Peixonauta - O Filme	Kiko Mistrorigo, Célia Catunda	Fábio Lucindo, Fernanda Bullara, Celso Alves		
Os Farofeiros	Roberto Santucci	Antônio Fragoso, Maurício Manfrini, Cacau Protásio		
Pra ficar na história	Boca Migotto			
A imagem da tolerância	Joana Mariani, Paula Trabulsi			
Imagens do Estado Novo 1937-45	Eduardo Escorel			
A luta do século	Sérgio Machado			
Híbridos - Os espíritos do Brasil	Priscilla Telmon, Vincent Moon			
O silêncio da noite é que tem sido testemunha das minhas amarguras	Petrônio de Lorena			
Soldados do Araguaia	Belisario Franca			
Górgona	Pedro Jezler, Fábio Furtado			
Nada a Perder: Contra Tudo. Por Todos.	Alexandre Avancini	Petrônio Gontijo, Day Mesquita, Dalton Vigh, Beth Goulart, André Gonçalves, Eduardo Galvão, Marcello Airoldi		
Arábia	Affonso Uchôa, João Dumans			
Tropykaos	Daniel Lisboa			
Em nome da América	Fernando Weller			
Severina	Felipe Hirsch			
Aos teus olhos	Carolina Jabor	Daniel de Oliveira, Malu Galli, Marco Ricca		
Todo clichê do amor	Rafael Primot	Maria Luisa Mendonça, Débora Falabella, Marjorie Estiano		
Quase memória	Ruy Guerra			
Construindo pontes	Heloisa Passos			
Pagliacci	Chico Gomes, Julio Hey, Luiza Villaça, Pedro Moscalcoff, Luiz Villaça			
Praça Paris	Lúcia Murat			
Rogério Duarte, o tropikaoslista	José Walter Lima			
Ex-Pajé	Luiz Bolognesi		Special Mention at the 68th Berlin International Film Festival	
Teu mundo não cabe nos meus olhos	Paulo Nascimento	Edson Celulari, Soledad Villamil, Leonardo Machado		
Para ter onde ir	Jorane Castro			
O renascimento do parto 2	Eduardo Chauvet			
Todos os Paulos do mundo	Rodrigo de Oliveira, Gustavo Ribeiro			
O processo	Maria Augusta Ramos			
Querida mamãe	Jeremias Moreira Filho	Selma Egrei, Letícia Sabatella, Marat Descartes		
Berenice procura	Allan Fiterman	Claudia Abreu, Eduardo Moscovis, Vera Holtz		
Antes que eu me esqueça	Leo Garcia, Zeca Brito			
A vida extra-ordinária de Tarso de Castro	Tiago Arakilian			
Alguém como eu	Leonel Vieira	Paolla Oliveira, Ricardo Pereira, Júlia Rabello		
Paraíso perdido	Monique Gardenberg	Lee Taylor, Jaloo, Júlio Andrade		
João de Deus - o silêncio é uma prece	Candé Salles			
Em um mundo interior	Flavio Frederico, Mariana Pamplona			
A superfície da sombra	Paulo Nascimento			
Caminho do mar	Bebeto Abrantes			
Los Territorios	Ivan Granovsky			
As boas maneiras	Juliana Rojas, Marco Dutra	Isabél Zuaa, Marjorie Estiano, Miguel Lobo		
Talvez uma História de Amor	Rodrigo Spada Bernardo	Mateus Solano, Thaila Ayala, Bianca Comparato		
Baronesa	Juliana Antunes			
Em 97 era assim	Zeca Brito			
Amores De Chumbo	Tuca Siqueira			
Canastra Suja	Caio Sóh			
Mulheres Alteradas	Luis Pinheiro	Daniel Boaventura, Maria Casadevall, Sergio Guizé, Monica Iozzi, Alessandra Negrini, Deborah Secco		
Tungstênio	Heitor Dhalia			
O Nó Do Diabo	Ramon Porto Mota, Gabriel Martins, Ian Abé, Jhésus Tribuzi			
Além do Homem	Willy Biondani			
O Desmonte do Monte	Sinai Sganzerla			
Auto De Resistência	Natasha Neri, Lula Carvalho			

== See also ==
- 2018 in Brazil
