= Qual é o Seu Talento? =

Brazilian reality television series

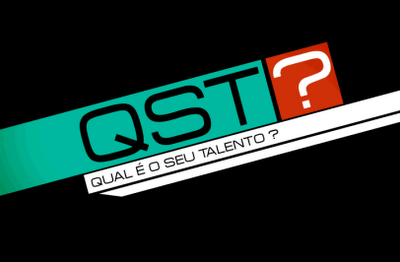
- Created by: Silvio Santos
- Presented by: André Vasco; Laura Fontana (2010–)
- Judges: Thomas Roth; Arnaldo Saccomani; Carlos Eduardo Miranda; Cyz Zamorano
- Country of origin: Brazil
- No. of seasons: 4
- No. of episodes: 112

Production
- Production locations: São Paulo, São Paulo
- Running time: 60 minutes
- Production company: SBT

Original release
- Network: SBT
- Release: August 5, 2009 – present

Qual é o Seu Talento? (English: What's Your Talent?), often shortened to QST?, was a Brazilian reality television series on the SBT, a modern version of Show de Calouros created by Silvio Santos in the 1970s.

Former MTV Brasil VJ André Vasco is the show's main host and the judging panel consisted of Thomas Roth, Arnaldo Saccomani, Carlos Eduardo Miranda and Cyz Zamorano (the same four from the first two seasons of Ídolos Brazil). On June 23, 2010, season 2 fourth-place finisher Laura Fontana, the "Baby Lady Gaga", joins the cast as the show's backstage interviewer.

On the show, singers, dancers, magicians, comedians, variety acts, and other performers of all ages compete against each other for the advertised top prize. Among its significant features were that it gave an opportunity to talented amateurs or unknown performers, with the results decided by the judges vote.

== Cast members ==
Presenters
Name	Years	Seasons
André Vasco	2009–2012	1–4
Laura Fontana	2010	3
Judges
Name	Years	Seasons
Thomas Roth	2009–2012	1–4
Arnaldo Saccomani	2009–2012	1–4
Carlos Eduardo Miranda	2009–2012	1–4
Cyz Zamorano	2009–2012	1–4

== Selection process ==
=== Auditions ===
Before the auditions in front of the judges are held, there are separate untelevised producers' auditions which come to various cities across Brazil. Only 130–180 contestants per season advanced to the São Paulo Round.

=== São Paulo Round ===
For the São Paulo round, each of the four judges has two buttons in front of them. At the end of the act, each judge must to vote, pressing one of the buttons: a red :( or a green :). Contestants who took one or more red votes would be automatically eliminated, while contestants who took all green votes would gets through to the semi-finals.

=== Semi-finals ===
There were five–six semifinals, each with seven–nine contestants. Judges voted with the same criterion: contestants who took one or more red :( votes would be automatically eliminated, while contestants who took all green :) votes would return at the end of the episode for the judges to decide who would go to the final.

==== Wild Card ====
In season 1, eleven contestants who took all green votes on the semifinals but failed to make it to the final were invited back to the show. In the end, lyrical singer Márcio Sena was chosen by the judges as the sixth and final member of the final six, where it eventually would be in fifth place.

== Season chronology ==
Season	Winner	Runner-up	Semifinalists	Episodes	Grand Prize
1 (2009)	D-Efeitos Group	Magician Renner	45	20	R$100,000
2 (2010)	Júlia Gomes	Danillu	45	26	R$200,000
3 (2010)	Igor Martins and Raiz Coral	Ginasloucos	45	27	R$200,000
4 (2011–2012)	Gabriela Maldonado	Rayglen Galvis and Instituto Lohan	45	26	R$200,000

== Ratings ==
=== Brazilian ratings ===
Season	Timeslot	Premiere	Points		Rank Timeslot	Timeslot	Finale	Points		Rank Timeslot	Sources
Season	Timeslot	Premiere	Avge	Peak	Rank Timeslot	Timeslot	Finale	Avge	Peak	Rank Timeslot	Sources
1	Wed. 08:00PM	Aug 05, 2009	07	11	#3	Wed. 08:15PM	Dec 16, 2009	10	17	#2	
2	Wed. 08:15PM	Jan 06, 2010	08	12	#2	Sat. 06:00 PM	Jun 19, 2010	06	09	#3	
3	Wed. 09:15PM	Jun 23, 2010	07	09	#3	Wed. 08:15PM	Dec 15, 2010	05	07	#3	
4	Monday; 08:30 PM	May 2, 2011	07	11	#3	Monday; 08:30PM	Jan 9, 2012	08	11	#2	

- Each point represents 60.000 households in São Paulo.
