= 1998 FIVB Men's Volleyball World Championship qualification =

- Dates: 26 September 1997 – 19 December 1997
- Teams: 59 (from 5 confederations)

The 1998 FIVB Men's Volleyball World Championship qualification was a qualification event, played in 1997 and 1998, for the thirteenth edition of Men's World Championship, which was held in Japan. The event was split into several groups divided by continent.

== Confederation qualification processes ==
The distribution by confederation for the 1998 FIVB Men's Volleyball World Championship was:

- Asia and Oceania (AVC): 5 places (+ Japan qualified automatically as host nation for a total of 6 places)
- Africa (CAVB): 2 places
- Europe (CEV): 11 places
- South America (CSV) 2 places
- North America (NORCECA): 3 places

== Africa ==
8 national teams originally entered qualification but Malawi, Liberia and Côte d'Ivoire withdrew, Cameroon was later added to Pool B.

Pool A	Pool B
Tunisia; Algeria; Kenya; ~~Ivory Coast~~	Egypt; Nigeria; ~~Liberia~~; ~~Malawi~~

=== Pool A ===
- Venue: Tunis, Tunisia
- Dates: November 14–16, 1997

Pos	Team	Pld	W	L	Pts	SW	SL	SR	SPW	SPL	SPR
1	Algeria	2	2	0	4	6	1	6.000	99	57	1.737
2	Tunisia	2	1	1	3	4	3	1.333	86	82	1.049
3	Kenya	2	0	2	2	0	6	0.000	44	90	0.489

Date		Score		Set 1	Set 2	Set 3	Set 4	Set 5	Total
14 Nov	Algeria	3–0	Kenya	15–3	15–10	15–3			45–16
15 Nov	Tunisia	3–0	Kenya	15–10	15–6	15–12			45–28
16 Nov	Tunisia	1–3	Algeria	14–16	15–8	4–15	8–15		41–54

=== Pool B ===
- Venue: Kano, Nigeria
- Dates: September 26–28, 1997

Pos	Team	Pld	W	L	Pts	SW	SL	SR	SPW	SPL	SPR
1	Egypt	2	2	0	4	6	0	MAX	91	59	1.542
2	Nigeria	2	1	1	3	3	4	0.750	88	91	0.967
3	Cameroon	2	0	2	2	1	6	0.167	70	99	0.707

Date		Score		Set 1	Set 2	Set 3	Set 4	Set 5	Total
26 Sep	Nigeria	0–3	Egypt	7–15	13–15	14–16			34–46
27 Sep	Nigeria	3–1	Cameroon	15–9	15–11	9–15	15–10		54–45
28 Sep	Egypt	3–0	Cameroon	15–12	15–3	15–10			45–25

== Asia-Pacific ==
12 national teams entered qualification but Bahrain and Philippines withdrew. Top two teams from Pool C and D and Pool E winner qualified to the World Championship.

Pool C	Pool D	Pool E
South Korea; Saudi Arabia; Thailand; Indonesia	China; Iran; ~~Philippines~~; Kazakhstan	Australia; Uzbekistan; Chinese Taipei; ~~Bahrain~~

=== Pool C ===
- Venue: Jeddah, Saudi Arabia
- Dates: October 3–5, 1997

Pos	Team	Pld	W	L	Pts	SW	SL	SR	SPW	SPL	SPR
1	South Korea	3	3	0	6	9	0	MAX	135	41	3.293
2	Thailand	3	2	1	5	6	3	2.000	106	98	1.082
3	Saudi Arabia	3	1	2	4	3	6	0.500	97	114	0.851
4	Indonesia	3	0	3	3	0	9	0.000	50	135	0.370

Date		Score		Set 1	Set 2	Set 3	Set 4	Set 5	Total
03 Oct	Saudi Arabia	0–3	Thailand	12–15	9–15	13–15			34–45
03 Oct	South Korea	3–0	Indonesia	15–1	15–6	15–0			45–7
04 Oct	Thailand	3–0	Indonesia	15–10	15–1	15–8			45–19
04 Oct	Saudi Arabia	0–3	South Korea	0–15	8–15	10–15			18–45
05 Oct	South Korea	3–0	Thailand	15–8	15–2	15–6			45–16
05 Oct	Saudi Arabia	3–0	Indonesia	15–10	15–6	15–8			45–24

=== Pool D ===
- Venue: Tehran, Iran
- Dates: December 17–19, 1997

Pos	Team	Pld	W	L	Pts	SW	SL	SR	SPW	SPL	SPR
1	China	2	2	0	4	6	0	MAX	90	30	3.000
2	Iran	2	1	1	3	3	4	0.750	69	87	0.793
3	Kazakhstan	2	0	2	2	1	6	0.167	60	102	0.588

Date		Score		Set 1	Set 2	Set 3	Set 4	Set 5	Total
17 Dec	China	3–0	Kazakhstan	15–3	15–8	15–7			45–18
18 Dec	Iran	3–1	Kazakhstan	15–10	15–5	12–15	15–12		57–42
19 Dec	China	3–0	Iran	15–6	15–1	15–5			45–12

=== Pool E ===
- Venue: Tashkent, Uzbekistan
- Dates: December 12–14, 1997

Pos	Team	Pld	W	L	Pts	SW	SL	SR	SPW	SPL	SPR
1	Australia	2	2	0	4	6	0	MAX	90	49	1.837
2	Chinese Taipei	2	1	1	3	3	3	1.000	68	73	0.932
3	Uzbekistan	2	0	2	2	0	6	0.000	54	90	0.600

Date		Score		Set 1	Set 2	Set 3	Set 4	Set 5	Total
12 Dec	Uzbekistan	0–3	Chinese Taipei	7–15	11–15	10–15			28–45
13 Dec	Chinese Taipei	0–3	Australia	9–15	4–15	10–15			23–45
14 Dec	Australia	3–0	Uzbekistan	15–7	15–10	15–9			45–26

== Europe ==
28 national teams entered qualification. The teams were distributed according to their position in the FIVB Senior Men's Rankings. Teams ranked 1–15 automatically qualified for the second round.

Sub Pool a	Sub Pool b	Sub Pool c	Sub Pool d	Pool F
Denmark; Sweden; Estonia	France; Belgium; Austria	Turkey; Israel; Croatia	Hungary; Slovakia; Belarus; Bosnia and Herzegovina	Italy; Finland; 1st Sub Pool c 1st Sub Pool b
Pool G	Pool H	Pool I	Pool J	Pool K
Netherlands; Germany; Ukraine; 2nd Sub Pool c	Russia; Poland; 1st Sub Pool d 2nd Sub Pool a	Bulgaria; Spain; Romania; 2nd Sub Pool d	Yugoslavia; Greece; 1st Sub Pool a 2nd Sub Pool b	Portugal; Czech Republic; Latvia

=== Sub Pool a ===
- Venue: Home and Away
- Dates: April 26 – June 12, 1997

Pos	Team	Pld	W	L	Pts	SW	SL	SR	SPW	SPL	SPR
1	Sweden	4	4	0	8	12	3	4.000	0	0	—
2	Denmark	4	2	2	6	8	7	1.143	0	0	—
3	Estonia	4	0	4	4	2	12	0.167	0	0	—

Date		Score		Set 1	Set 2	Set 3	Set 4	Set 5	Total
26 Apr	Estonia	0–3	Sweden	13–15	7–15	4–15			24–45
27 Apr	Estonia	1–3	Denmark						
01 May	Denmark	3–0	Estonia						
03 May	Sweden	3–1	Estonia	15–2	13–15	15–5	15–10		58–32
10 Jun	Denmark	2–3	Sweden	17–15	14–16	6–15	16–14	10–15	63–75
12 Jun	Sweden	3–0	Denmark	15–6	15–7	15–1			45–14

=== Sub Pool b ===
- Venue: Lille, France
- Dates: June 27–29, 1997

Pos	Team	Pld	W	L	Pts	SW	SL	SR	SPW	SPL	SPR
1	Belgium	2	2	0	4	6	2	3.000	0	0	—
2	France	2	1	1	3	5	3	1.667	100	76	1.316
3	Austria	2	0	2	2	0	6	0.000	0	0	—

Date		Score		Set 1	Set 2	Set 3	Set 4	Set 5	Total
27 Jun	Belgium	3–0	Austria						
28 Jun	France	3–0	Austria	15–10	15–4	15–3			45–17
29 Jun	France	2–3	Belgium	6–15	15–4	11–15	15–10	8–15	55–59

=== Sub Pool c ===
- Venue: Istanbul, Turkey
- Dates: April 30 – May 2, 1997

Pos	Team	Pld	W	L	Pts	SW	SL	SR	SPW	SPL	SPR
1	Turkey	2	2	0	4	6	2	3.000	0	0	—
2	Croatia	2	1	1	3	3	3	1.000	0	0	—
3	Israel	2	0	2	2	2	6	0.333	0	0	—

Date		Score		Set 1	Set 2	Set 3	Set 4	Set 5	Total
30 Apr	Turkey	3–2	Israel						
01 May	Israel	0–3	Croatia						
02 May	Turkey	3–0	Croatia						

=== Sub Pool d ===
- Venue: Debrecen, Hungary
- Dates: June 6–8, 1997

Pos	Team	Pld	W	L	Pts	SW	SL	SR	SPW	SPL	SPR
1	Hungary	3	3	0	6	9	1	9.000	0	0	—
2	Slovakia	3	2	1	5	6	4	1.500	139	119	1.168
3	Bosnia and Herzegovina	3	1	2	4	3	7	0.429	0	0	—
4	Belarus	3	0	3	3	2	9	0.222	0	0	—

Date		Score		Set 1	Set 2	Set 3	Set 4	Set 5	Total
06 Jun	Slovakia	3–0	Bosnia and Herzegovina	15–8	15–13	15–6			45–27
06 Jun	Hungary	3–1	Belarus						
07 Jun	Slovakia	3–1	Belarus	15–11	15–11	13–15	15–9		58–46
07 Jun	Hungary	3–0	Bosnia and Herzegovina						
08 Jun	Belarus	1–3	Bosnia and Herzegovina						
08 Jun	Hungary	3–0	Slovakia	15–11	15–11	16–14			46–36

=== Pool F ===
- Venue: Montecatini Terme, Italy
- Dates: August 8–10, 1997

Pos	Team	Pld	W	L	Pts	SW	SL	SR	SPW	SPL	SPR
1	Italy	3	3	0	6	9	1	9.000	138	85	1.624
2	Turkey	3	2	1	5	6	4	1.500	140	139	1.007
3	Belgium	3	1	2	4	3	7	0.429	126	135	0.933
4	Finland	3	0	3	3	2	9	0.222	110	155	0.710

Date		Score		Set 1	Set 2	Set 3	Set 4	Set 5	Total
08 Aug	Finland	1–3	Turkey	15–12	4–15	8–15	13–15		40–57
08 Aug	Belgium	0–3	Italy	7–15	5–15	10–15			22–45
09 Aug	Finland	1–3	Belgium	6–15	15–7	9–15	4–15		34–52
09 Aug	Turkey	0–3	Italy	6–15	15–17	6–15			27–47
10 Aug	Belgium	1–3	Turkey	15–10	14–16	11–15	12–15		52–56
10 Aug	Italy	3–0	Finland	15–11	16–14	15–11			46–36

=== Pool G ===
- Venue: Groningen, Netherlands
- Dates: August 22–24, 1997

Pos	Team	Pld	W	L	Pts	SW	SL	SR	SPW	SPL	SPR
1	Netherlands	3	3	0	6	9	2	4.500	152	101	1.505
2	Ukraine	3	2	1	5	6	4	1.500	124	103	1.204
3	Germany	3	1	2	4	6	7	0.857	152	157	0.968
4	Croatia	3	0	3	3	1	9	0.111	71	138	0.514

Date		Score		Set 1	Set 2	Set 3	Set 4	Set 5	Total
22 Aug	Germany	1–3	Ukraine	9–15	9–15	15–13	5–15		38–58
22 Aug	Croatia	0–3	Netherlands	7–15	1–15	6–15			14–45
23 Aug	Germany	3–1	Croatia	15–7	15–8	3–15	15–7		48–37
23 Aug	Ukraine	0–3	Netherlands	7–15	9–15	5–15			21–45
24 Aug	Croatia	0–3	Ukraine	13–15	3–15	4–15			20–45
24 Aug	Netherlands	3–2	Germany	9–15	6–15	17–15	15–8	15–13	62–66

=== Pool H ===
- Venue: Olsztyn, Poland
- Dates: August 15–17, 1997

Pos	Team	Pld	W	L	Pts	SW	SL	SR	SPW	SPL	SPR
1	Russia	3	3	0	6	9	0	MAX	135	44	3.068
2	Poland	3	2	1	5	6	4	1.500	125	120	1.042
3	Hungary	3	1	2	4	3	6	0.500	93	125	0.744
4	Denmark	3	0	3	3	1	9	0.111	83	147	0.565

Date		Score		Set 1	Set 2	Set 3	Set 4	Set 5	Total
15 Aug	Russia	3–0	Denmark	15–1	15–8	15–2			45–11
15 Aug	Hungary	0–3	Poland	8–15	14–16	14–16			36–47
16 Aug	Russia	3–0	Hungary	15–3	15–9	15–0			45–12
16 Aug	Denmark	1–3	Poland	15–12	10–15	11–15	3–15		39–57
17 Aug	Hungary	3–0	Denmark	15–12	15–11	15–10			45–33
17 Aug	Poland	0–3	Russia	5–15	10–15	6–15			21–45

=== Pool I ===
- Venue: Sofia, Bulgaria
- Dates: August 22–24, 1997

Pos	Team	Pld	W	L	Pts	SW	SL	SR	SPW	SPL	SPR
1	Spain	3	3	0	6	9	2	4.500	158	100	1.580
2	Bulgaria	3	2	1	5	7	6	1.167	181	162	1.117
3	Slovakia	3	1	2	4	4	7	0.571	128	142	0.901
4	Romania	3	0	3	3	4	9	0.444	124	187	0.663

Date		Score		Set 1	Set 2	Set 3	Set 4	Set 5	Total
22 Aug	Spain	3–0	Slovakia	15–7	15–5	15–9			45–21
22 Aug	Romania	2–3	Bulgaria	9–15	15–12	2–15	17–16	13–15	56–73
23 Aug	Spain	3–1	Romania	11–15	15–2	15–6	15–6		56–29
23 Aug	Slovakia	1–3	Bulgaria	15–11	5–15	16–17	13–15		49–58
24 Aug	Romania	1–3	Slovakia	15–17	6–15	15–11	3–15		39–58
24 Aug	Bulgaria	1–3	Spain	15–10	15–17	9–15	11–15		50–57

=== Pool J ===
- Venue: Athens, Greece
- Dates: December 20–22, 1997

Pos	Team	Pld	W	L	Pts	SW	SL	SR	SPW	SPL	SPR
1	Yugoslavia	3	3	0	6	9	1	9.000	146	95	1.537
2	Greece	3	2	1	5	6	4	1.500	133	119	1.118
3	France	3	1	2	4	4	6	0.667	130	125	1.040
4	Sweden	3	0	3	3	1	9	0.111	75	145	0.517

Date		Score		Set 1	Set 2	Set 3	Set 4	Set 5	Total
20 Dec	Yugoslavia	3–0	France	15–12	15–9	16–14			46–35
20 Dec	Sweden	0–3	Greece	8–15	6–15	10–15			24–45
21 Dec	France	1–3	Greece	15–10	12–15	9–15	14–16		50–56
21 Dec	Yugoslavia	3–1	Sweden	10–15	15–9	15–3	15–1		55–28
22 Dec	Sweden	0–3	France	8–15	9–15	6–15			23–45
22 Dec	Greece	0–3	Yugoslavia	9–15	10–15	13–15			32–45

=== Pool K ===
- Venue: Home and Away
- Dates: June 14 – December 28, 1997

Pos	Team	Pld	W	L	Pts	SW	SL	SR	SPW	SPL	SPR
1	Czech Republic	4	3	1	7	11	4	2.750	203	172	1.180
2	Latvia	4	3	1	7	10	5	2.000	213	156	1.365
3	Portugal	4	0	4	4	0	12	0.000	92	180	0.511

Date		Score		Set 1	Set 2	Set 3	Set 4	Set 5	Total
14 Jun	Portugal	0–3	Latvia	9–15	8–15	8–15			25–45
27 Jun	Czech Republic	3–0	Portugal	15–8	15–8	15–6			45–22
16 Aug	Latvia	3–2	Czech Republic	15–6	13–15	12–15	15–5	19–17	74–58
27 Aug	Czech Republic	3–1	Latvia	10–15	15–12	15–11	15–11		55–49
15 Nov	Latvia	3–0	Portugal	15–3	15–10	15–5			45–18
28 Dec	Portugal	0–3	Czech Republic	13–15	13–15	1–15			27–45

== Norceca ==
Pool L	Pool M
Cuba; Canada; Puerto Rico; Barbados	United States; Mexico; Haiti

=== Pool L ===
- Venue: Havana, Cuba
- Dates: February 6–8, 1998

Pos	Team	Pld	W	L	Pts	SW	SL	SR	SPW	SPL	SPR
1	Canada	3	3	0	6	9	1	9.000	146	80	1.825
2	Cuba	3	2	1	5	7	3	2.333	143	75	1.907
3	Puerto Rico	3	1	2	4	3	6	0.500	70	113	0.619
4	Barbados	3	0	3	3	0	9	0.000	44	135	0.326

Date		Score		Set 1	Set 2	Set 3	Set 4	Set 5	Total
06 Feb	Canada	3–0	Puerto Rico	15–4	15–2	15–8			45–14
06 Feb	Cuba	3–0	Barbados	15–6	15–1	15–1			45–8
07 Feb	Canada	3–0	Barbados	15–3	15–7	15–3			45–13
07 Feb	Cuba	3–0	Puerto Rico	15–0	15–7	15–4			45–11
08 Feb	Barbados	0–3	Puerto Rico	8–15	12–15	3–15			23–45
08 Feb	Cuba	1–3	Canada	15–8	14–16	15–17	9–15		53–56

=== Pool M ===
- Venue: San Antonio, United States
- Dates: January 29 – February 1, 1998

==== Preliminary round ====
Pos	Team	Pld	W	L	Pts	SW	SL	SR	SPW	SPL	SPR
1	United States	2	2	0	4	6	0	MAX	90	33	2.727
2	Mexico	2	1	1	3	3	3	1.000	67	53	1.264
3	Haiti	2	0	2	2	0	6	0.000	19	90	0.211

Date		Score		Set 1	Set 2	Set 3	Set 4	Set 5	Total
29 Jan	United States	3–0	Haiti	15–2	15–9	15–0			45–11
30 Jan	Haiti	0–3	Mexico	4–15	3–15	1–15			8–45
31 Jan	Mexico	0–3	United States	8–15	7–15	7–15			22–45

==== Final ====
Date		Score		Set 1	Set 2	Set 3	Set 4	Set 5	Total
01 Feb	United States	3–0	Mexico	15–6	15–7	15–1			45–14

==== Final standing ====
Rank	Team
1	United States
2	Mexico
3	Haiti

=== Playoff ===
- Venue: Mexico City, Mexico
- Dates: February 28 – March 1, 1998

Pos	Team	Pld	W	L	Pts	SW	SL	SR	SPW	SPL	SPR
1	Cuba	2	2	0	4	6	1	6.000	101	51	1.980
2	Mexico	2	0	2	2	1	6	0.167	51	101	0.505

Date		Score		Set 1	Set 2	Set 3	Set 4	Set 5	Total
28 Feb	Cuba	3–1	Mexico	16–14	10–15	15–5	15–7		56–41
01 Mar	Mexico	0–3	Cuba	2–15	0–15	8–15			10–45

== South America ==
4 national teams entered qualification.

Pool N

Brazil
Argentina
Venezuela
Peru

=== Pool N ===
- Venue: Santa Fe, Argentina and Rio de Janeiro, Brazil
- Dates: September 5–21, 1997

Pos	Team	Pld	W	L	Pts	SW	SL	SR	SPW	SPL	SPR
1	Brazil	6	6	0	12	18	3	6.000	302	157	1.924
2	Argentina	6	3	3	9	14	9	1.556	288	233	1.236
3	Venezuela	6	3	3	9	9	11	0.818	222	218	1.018
4	Peru	6	0	6	6	0	18	0.000	66	270	0.244

Date		Score		Set 1	Set 2	Set 3	Set 4	Set 5	Total
05 Sep	Venezuela	0–3	Brazil	3–15	10–15	10–15			23–45
05 Sep	Argentina	3–0	Peru	15–4	15–3	15–7			45–14
06 Sep	Peru	0–3	Brazil	1–15	7–15	9–15			17–45
06 Sep	Argentina	2–3	Venezuela	15–7	15–7	15–17	6–15	13–15	64–61
07 Sep	Venezuela	3–0	Peru	15–4	15–2	15–4			45–10
07 Sep	Brazil	3–1	Argentina	15–7	9–15	15–7	15–12		54–41
19 Sep	Argentina	3–0	Venezuela	15–13	15–12	15–4			45–29
19 Sep	Peru	0–3	Brazil	1–15	3–15	5–15			9–45
20 Sep	Argentina	3–0	Peru	15–4	15–2	15–1			45–7
20 Sep	Venezuela	0–3	Brazil	8–15	4–15	7–15			19–45
21 Sep	Peru	0–3	Venezuela	2–15	4–15	3–15			9–45
21 Sep	Brazil	3–2	Argentina	15–4	14–16	15–3	9–15	15–10	68–48
