= Júlia Gomes =

Brazilian singer and actress (born 2002)

- Born: Júlia Melo Gomes; 10 March 2002 (age 24)
- Origin: São Paulo, Brazil
- Occupations: Actress, singer
- Instrument: Piano
- Years active: 2010–present
- Website: JuliaGomes.com.br

Júlia Melo Gomes (born 10 March 2002) is a Brazilian singer and actress. She become nationally known after winning the second season of the talent show Qual é o Seu Talento?.

== Qual é o Seu Talento? ==
Júlia Gomes auditioned on Qual é o Seu Talento? 2 in late-2009 and then advanced to the São Paulo Round, where she sang "Carinhoso" by Marisa Monte. She then advanced to the semi-finals, singing "Ben" by Michael Jackson.

During the finals, she sang "I Will Always Love You" by Whitney Houston. Júlia was praised by all the judges, who said the version of the song was beautiful and the girl knocked the other contestants, such as Laura Fontana, the Baby Lady Gaga.

In the end, she came out as the winner, while lyrical singer Danillu and acrobatic gymnastics Guaru ESD were the runners-up.

=== Performances ===
Week #	Theme	Song Choice	Original Artist	Order #	Result
Audition	N/A	N/A	N/A	N/A	Advanced
SP Round	N/A	"Carinhoso"	Pixinguinha / Marisa Monte	N/A	Advanced
Semi-final	Group 6: Kids	"Ben"	Michael Jackson	6	Advanced
Final	Gran Finale	"I Will Always Love You"	Whitney Houston	3	Winner

=== Post Qual é o Seu Talento? ===
After finishing as the winner, she attended several SBT shows. With the R$200,000 prize, Júlia will take a trip to Disney World, buy a piano, and invest in her singing career.

Preceded by D-Efeitos	Qual é o Seu Talento? winner 2010	Succeeded by TBA
