= Pension reform in Brazil =

Brazilian government proposals

National Congress
- Long title: Modifies the social security system, stablishes transition rules and transitory dispositions and gives other providences.
- Territorial extent: Whole of Brazil
- Passed by: Chamber of Deputies
- Passed: 7 August 2019
- Passed by: Federal Senate
- Passed: 22 October 2019
- Signed by: President Jair Bolsonaro
- Signed: 12 November 2019
- Effective: 1 March 2020

Legislative history

Initiating chamber: Chamber of Deputies
- Bill title: Constitutional Amendment Project 6/2019
- Bill citation: PEC 6/2019
- Introduced by: President Jair Bolsonaro
- Introduced: 20 February 2019
- First reading: 20 February 2019
- Second reading: 5 July 2019
- Third reading: 1 August 2019
- Voting summary: 379 voted for; 131 voted against

Revising chamber: Federal Senate
- Bill title: Constitutional Amendment Project 6/2019
- Bill citation: PEC 6/2019
- Received from the Chamber of Deputies: 8 August 2019
- First reading: 8 August 2019
- Second reading: 4 September 2019
- Third reading: 1 October 2019
- Voting summary: 60 voted for; 19 voted against

Keywords
- Pension fund; Welfare; Welfare reform
- Status: In force

The Pension reform in Brazil was a proposal by the Brazilian government to amend the Constitution for the reform of the social security system of the country. By changing the country's constitution, it had to be approved in both houses of the National Congress by an absolute majority. The reform was created to combat the giant deficit in the pension system, of more than R$194 billion in 2018, and the rapid aging of the Brazilian population.

The original text was delivered by the President of Brazil Jair Bolsonaro to the President of the Chamber of Deputies Rodrigo Maia on 20 February 2019 to initiate the legal rite. The reform proposal was approved by the Federal Senate on 22 October 2019, becoming law and coming into force automatically. Among other details, the reform raises the retirement age and requires more time for civil service workers to receive a maximum retirement benefit.

== Previous reform attempts ==
Until the reform was approved in 2019, other governments had tried to approve their proposals. In Brazil's most recent history, the country has been debating pension reform every ten years, in some cases the proposals have simply been shelved as extremely unpopular, in others, mini-reforms have been made, but with long-term null effects, and in one case, the reform was rejected by the Chamber of Deputies by only one vote.

Already in the 1990s, the first attempts at reform predicted that with the aging of the Brazilian population over the next 20 years, the current pension system would become unsustainable, and this has proven true in recent years, with the deficit rising each year.

=== Fernando Henrique Cardoso ===
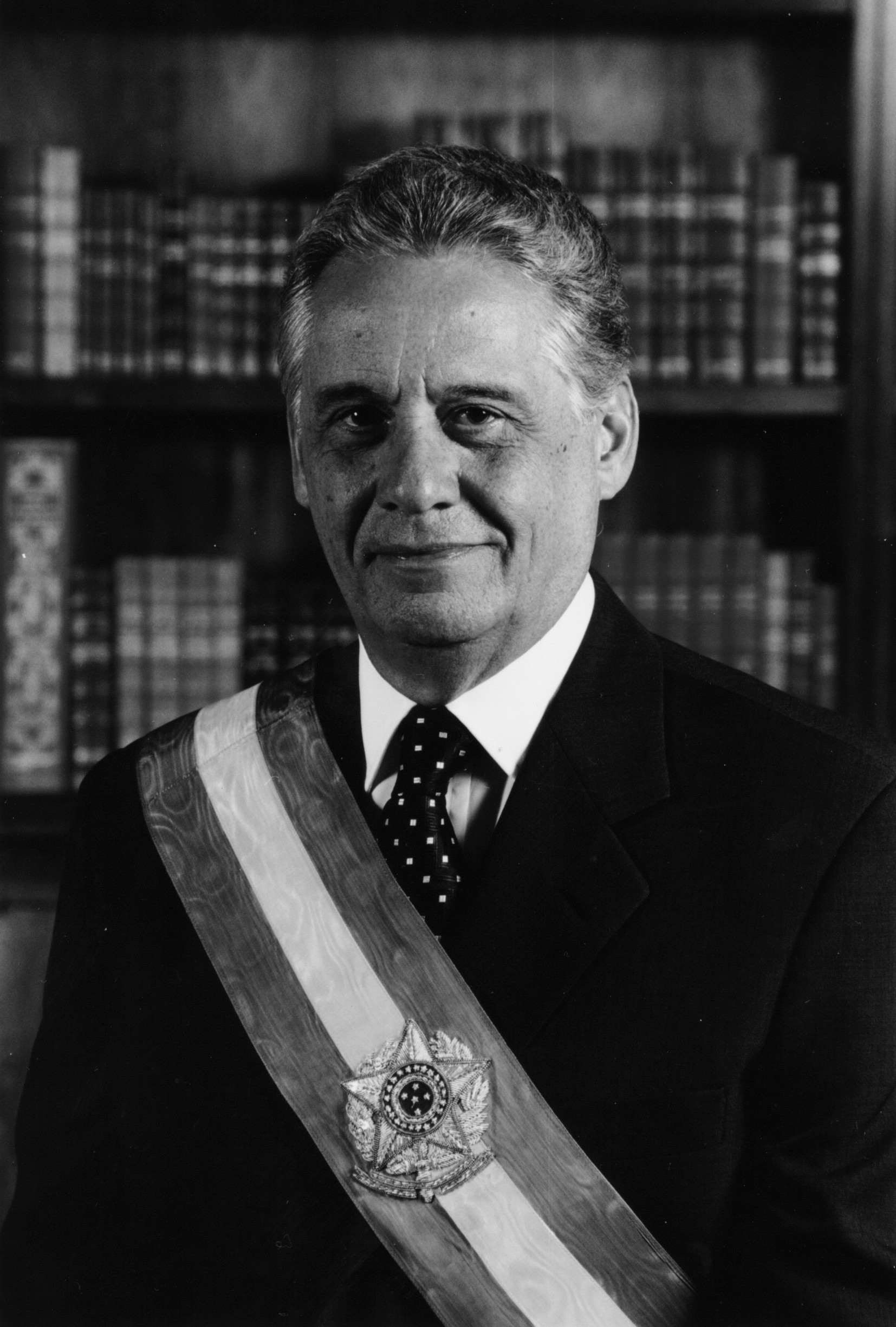
Former President of Brazil Fernando Henrique Cardoso, the first President to try the reform.

The first president to try to reform Brazil's pension system was Fernando Henrique Cardoso in the year 1995, when he presented his proposal to amend the Constitution. The bill was only approved by Congress three years later, resulting in a very dehydrated reform that had almost no long-term impacts.

Its main point was the minimum retirement ages of 55 years for women and 60 for men. As the first attempt in the country's history, the measure was extremely unpopular, and difficult to pass. Brazil's constitution says any amendment must be approved by an absolute majority in both houses, 308 votes in the Chamber of Deputies and 49 votes in the Senate. The main point of the proposal was rejected on the night of 6 May 1998 by the House by only one vote, the deputy Antonio Kandir of the ruling party PSDB, wrongly voted in abstention, causing the defeat of the government and the proposal.

At the end of the process, Fernando Henrique only passed a law that set minimum ages of 48 (women) and 53 (men) for federal servants to retire.

=== Luiz Inácio Lula da Silva ===
In Luiz Inácio Lula da Silva administration, there was a change in social security rules, centered on federal servants. A constitutional amendment restricted the possibility of full retirement to those who entered their careers until 2003. Those who joined after that had their benefits calculated according to the average of their contribution to Social Security. Retired servers now have an 11% discount. Minimum ages increased to 55 years (women) and 60 years (men).

=== Dilma Rousseff ===
For the first time, the private sector workers were hit in 2015 under the Dilma Rousseff government, with the rule known as 85/95. The standard grants full retirement to workers who, summing the contribution time and age, achieve a score equal to or greater than 85 points (for women) and 95 points (for men). The sum is progressive and currently stands at 86/96 points. Dilma also implemented Funpresp, a federal servant's supplementary social security fund, in 2013. Those who started their careers after Funpresp have their retirement limited to the INSS ceiling (R$5,839.45), with the option to contribute to the complementary fund.

=== Michel Temer ===
With the worsening of public accounts and the widening Social Security deficit, the Michel Temer government presented a broad reform proposal in December 2016. The articulation, however, sank in the face of complaints against the now former president.

== Jair Bolsonaro's proposal ==
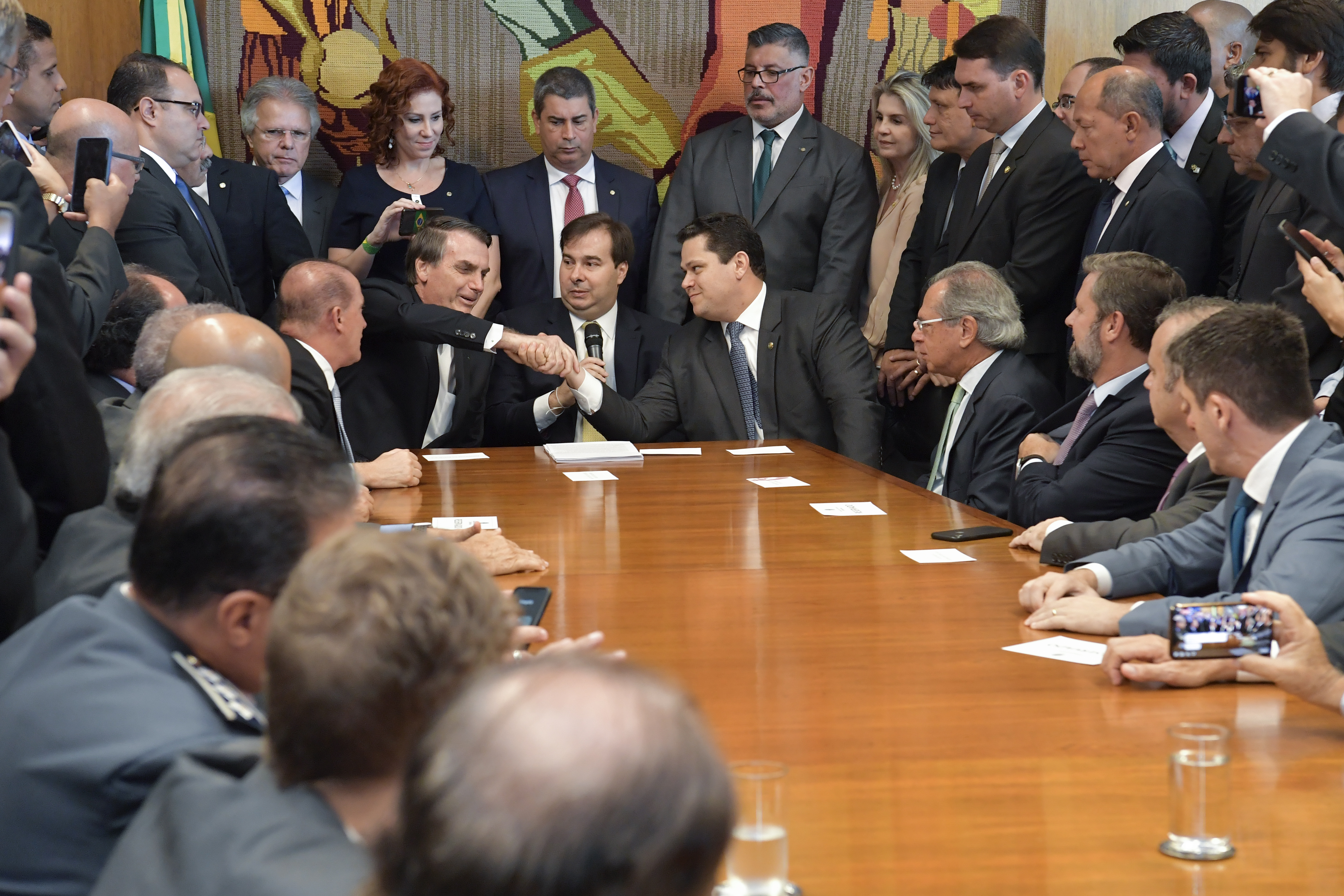
Brazilian President Jair Bolsonaro hands proposed pension reform to President of the Chamber of Deputies Rodrigo Maia and Feferal Senate President Davi Alcolumbre, 20 February 2019

Jair Bolsonaro won the elections with economically liberal, pro-market proposals. The Bolsonaro government's economic team, led by Minister of Economy Paulo Guedes, predicted that without the reform, Brazil would have no scope for investment in all areas of government.

They also predicted that mandatory expenditures would consume 100% of the budget as early as 2022. Estimates made by the Ministry of Planning showed that expenditures that the government cannot cut (such as those with social security benefits, personnel, allowance and unemployment insurance) would jump from 91.8% in 2017 to 101.4% in 2022. That means the economic team would have no margin to make investments and would still need to cut the budget to be able to close their accounts. According to Planning projections, discretionary expenses (essentially investments), which are already small, would be reduced gradually. They would go from 8.2% in 2017 to 2.1% in 2021. By 2022, this percentage is negative, at 1.4%, in order to make room for mandatory expenditure.

=== Minimum age and contribution time ===
The proposal creates a minimum retirement age. At the end of the transition period, there is no longer the possibility of retirement for contribution time. The minimum retirement age will be 62 for women and 65 for men for both private and servants.

=== Transition rules ===
The proposal provides for five transition rules, four of which are exclusive to private sector workers already on the market, one specific for servers and one common rule for all. Part of the rules will apply for up to 14 years after the reform is approved. Already the retirement rule by age (with 15 years of contribution for both sexes) will be guaranteed for all who already work in the market. By the text, the insured can always opt for the most advantageous form.

=== Civil service ===
The civil service also had changes. The plan has taken servers to take up to 30 years to reach the highest salaries. According to data from the Ministry of Planning, today a person starts his career as a government manager with a starting salary of R$16,993.64. In just six years, the salary of this server can reach R$20,521.98. The top of his career reaches 13 years of service: R$24,142.66. By the proposed project, the starting salary would be much lower, R$5,000, and it would only be possible to reach the highest salary after 30 years. Gradation would be slower, and the salary of R$20,521.98 would only be obtained after a period of 23 years. The expectation, with this measure, was to provide the public coffers with savings of R$18.6 billion over five years.

=== Rural ===
According to the text, the minimum age is maintained at 55 years for women and 60 for men. The minimum contribution time is also 15 years for women and men. The proposal affects, besides rural workers, people who perform family economy activities, including prospectors and artisanal fishermen.

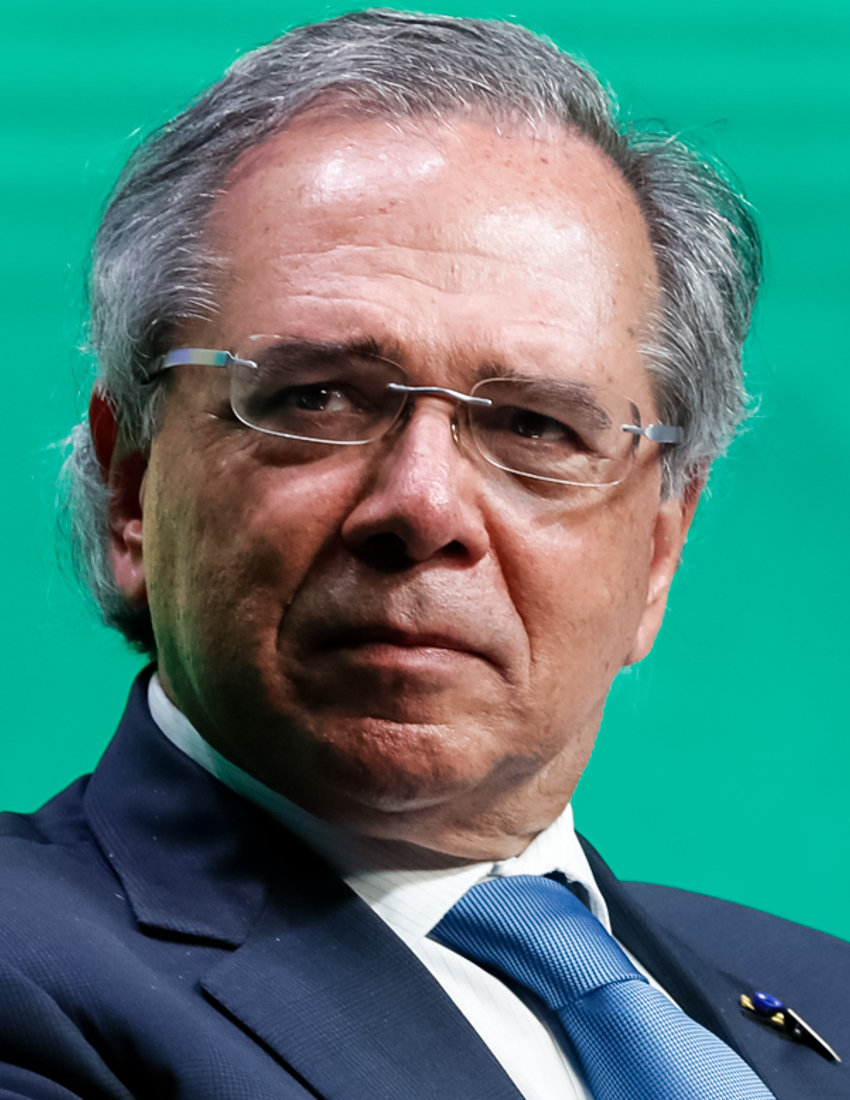
Minister of Economy of Brazil, Paulo Guedes

=== Permanent disability ===
Under the proposal, the benefit, which today is called disability retirement and is 100% of the average contribution salary for all, is now 60% plus 2% per annum of contribution that exceeds 20 years. In the event of disability due to an accident at work, occupational or occupational diseases, the benefit calculation does not change. The changes only affect the elementary and middle school teachers. For teachers of municipal and state networks nothing changes either, since states and municipalities were left out of reform.

=== Pension for death ===
Under the proposal, the value of the death pension will be lower. For both private and public sector workers, the family benefit will be 50% plus 10% per dependent, up to 100% for five or more dependents. However, the text also guarantees the benefit of at least one minimum wage in any situation. In the Chamber of Deputies, this floor is expected to be valid only in cases where the beneficiary has no other source of formal income. Those who already receive death benefits will not have their benefit changed. Dependents of employees who joined before the creation of supplementary pension will have the benefit calculated obeying the ceiling of the INSS.

=== Benefit accrual limit ===
Today, there is no limit to accumulating different benefits. The proposal provides that the beneficiary will receive 100% of the highest value benefit, plus a percentage of the sum of the others. This percentage will be 80% for benefits up to one minimum wage; 60% for between one and two salaries; 40% between two and three; 20% between three and four; and 10% for benefits above four minimum wages. Out of the new rule will be the accumulation of pensions provided for by law: doctors, teachers, pensions of their own regime or of the Armed Forces with general regime. The Chamber included in this forecast amounts received as compensation for political amnesties, which may be accrued with other benefits.

=== Salary allowance ===
The payment of the salary bonus continues to be paid to workers with income up to two minimum wages (R$1,996). The proposal to limit the allowance to those who earn up to R$1,364.43 was overturned through a highlight (suggestion of amendment).

=== Family allowance and imprisonment allowance ===
The text defines that the beneficiaries of family allowance and seclusion allowance should have income of up to R$1,364.43.

=== Retirement of Police and Penitentiary Agents ===
The proposal only targets federal police officers, federal highway police officers, federal legislative police officers, Federal District civil police officers, federal prison officers, and federal socio-educational agents; For military police officers, civil police officers and firefighters, current rules are maintained, with their own requirements determined by each state. The rule maintains the minimum retirement age at 55 for newcomers, and determines at least 30 years of contribution, and 25 in the job for both sexes.

A rule has also been created that provides a smoother transition option for those who are already active and about to retire. The minimum age may be 53 years for men and 52 for women, provided that the employee meets a 100% toll (additional contribution period) corresponding to the time that, on the date of entry into force of the new Social Security, will be lacking to reach the Contribution times of the Supplementary Law 1985: 30 years for men, at least 20 years in office, and 25 years for women, at least 15 years in office.

Both rules provide that these police officers are entitled to full pay, which is the right to retire with benefits equal to the last salary. The text stipulating that military police officers and firefighters would have the same retirement and pension rules as the Armed Forces - which are not included in the federal government reform proposal - was left out of the text until a local supplementary law sets standards for these corporations. The government presented on March 30 the specific proposal for military pension reform, which will have another process in Congress - that is, the approval of this PEC changes nothing for them.

=== Teachers ===
According to the text, teachers of basic education (kindergarten, elementary and high school) may retire with 57 years of age and 25 years of contribution; teachers, aged 60 and 25 years of contribution. For public network servers, the rules are the same, requiring at least 10 years of public service and five years in office. In the transition rules, the category will have a 5-point bonus in calculating the sum of the contribution time with age and a five-year reduction in the minimum age and minimum contribution time.

In addition, a change to a device that benefits teachers nearing retirement age has been approved. The change reduces the minimum age in the 100% toll transition rule by five years. For the category, the minimum age will be 52 for women and 55 for men, with a minimum contribution time of 25 years and 30 years, respectively. For servers, minimum 20 years in public service and five years in office.

=== Parliamentarians ===
The proposal provides for a minimum age of 65 for men and 62 for women, and 30% of the remaining contribution time to retire under the old rules. Today the minimum age is 60 years old minimum age for men and women with 35 years of contribution. New elected members will be automatically in the general regime, with extinction of the current regime. Current and former congressmen insured from the Congressional Social Security Plan will also be hit by the reform.

=== Magistrates ===
The government proposal did not specifically address the issue. But the text approved by the special commission proposes to withdraw from the Constitution the possibility of applying the disciplinary penalty of compulsory retirement.

=== Contribution of informal workers ===
Previously not included in the retirement, informal workers will be specified among low-income workers, and will have a lower contribution rate to access Social Security benefits, similar to that charged to individual microentrepreneurs (MEIs).

=== Special retirement for those exposed to harmful agents ===
The PEC proposes to allow special retirement for these workers by the point rule, also considering the time of exposure to these agents. For workers at higher risk, the sum should be 66 points, plus 15 years of exposure. For those with medium risk, 76 points and 20 years of exposure. For low risk, 86 points and 25 years of exposure to harmful agents. The text of the Chamber also provided for the increase of one point each year from the approval of the proposal, until reaching 81, 91 and 96 points, depending on the degree of risk to which the worker was subjected. Senate overturned this increase.

=== Continued benefit ===
The text allows people with disabilities and elderly people in poverty to continue to receive one minimum wage from the age of 65. The deputies approved the inclusion in the Constitution of the criterion for granting the benefit. The Senate overturned this prediction and the rule should follow as it is today: provided for in ordinary law, more easily modified than a constitutional rule.

== Opposition to reform ==
=== Age-based objections ===
For those who are against Social Security reform, the government's proposal to establish the minimum age as the sole criterion for retirement disregards the different life expectations within Brazil. For example, while states such as São Paulo, Distrito Federal, Espirito Santo and Rio Grande do Sul have an average of 77 years of life expectancy, in other states such as Rondônia, Roraima, Alagoas, Piauí and Maranhão, the average is 70 years. In this sense, the minimum age of 62 for women and 65 for men proposed by the current government is very high and close to the average life expectancy of some states. In addition, increasing the minimum contribution time to 20 years for men is disregarding the Brazilian reality – marked by informal work especially for people with lower education and income - and hindering access to retirement. Today, 15% of workers cannot contribute enough to retire.

=== Women's issues ===
Another argument against welfare reform is also a matter of perceived gender inequality. Contrary to the claim, critics argue raising the minimum retirement age for women is disregarding the double - even triple - journey they face. As a general rule, the minimum age for women would increase from 60 to 62 years. For rural workers, the minimum age would change from 55 to 60 years. Also, in the teacher categories, the Social Security proposal increases the minimum age of women by seven. According to the IBGE, in 2018, working women spent an average of 8.2 hours per week more than men on housework. In addition, according to Pnad data for the fourth quarter of 2018, 47% of women in the labour market are not registered - making it difficult for social security contributions.

=== Inequality and increase poverty ===
One of the reasons against the reform is in the proposal of a new calculation for the "benefit salary". Basically, this is the initial calculation for the vast majority of social security benefits - that is, it will influence the final income the worker will receive. Thus, while under the current rule the average wage calculation uses the highest 80% worker contributions since July 1994, by the rule proposed by the PEC the average wage calculation would be from all worker wages since 1994. This means that there would be a risk that the average would be “pulled down” by not excluding smaller contributions. Still, by the proposal, full retirement would only be possible for women after adding 35 years of contribution and for men after completing 40 years of contribution.

=== Income issues ===
Those against the New Welfare argue that reform will not end wealth privileges as it promises. This is because it is argued that the new rates do not actually reach the richest. In the private sector, it is intended to extend income brackets and increase contributions. This means that between R$3,000 to R$5,839.45, the last income bracket would impose a partial tax rate of 14% instead of 11% on the entire salary. In real terms, as the federal rate calculator shows, who earns R$5,839.45 would pay an effective rate of 11.69% - that is, R$682.55 - for the reform proposal. Under the current rule, who earns R$5,839.45, pays 11% contribution - R$642.34. Thus, those who oppose reform argue that such changes would not affect Brazil's super-wealthy. In the changes to the public sector, experts argue that taxing 22% on salaries over R$39,000 in the long run will amount to 0.4% of the total economy.

== History ==
The reform bill was entered into the Chamber of Deputies on 20 February 2019. It was passed by the Chamber on 11 July 2019 in a 379–131 vote, with the support of the centre-right majority and some dissidents from the centre-left (SDD, Cidadania and some PSB dissidents), while it was strongly opposed by the majority of centre-left parties (PT, PSB, PDT, PSOL and PCdoB).

The bill was passed by the Federal Senate on 23 October 2019 in a 60–19 vote and signed by Bolsonaro on the same day. It entered into force after its publication on the Diário Oficial da União some days later.

== See also ==
- Ministry of Economy
- Pension reform
