= Simone Carneiro =

Brazilian footballer

Personal information
- Full name: Simone Sueli Carneiro
- Date of birth: 10 January 1968
- Place of birth: Itariri, Brazil
- Date of death: 15 June 2018 (aged 50)
- Place of death: Itariri, Brazil
- Position: Goalkeeper

International career
Years	Team	Apps	(Gls)
- Brazil

Simone Sueli Carneiro (10 January 1968 – 20 June 2018), better known as Simone, was a Brazilian footballer who played as a goalkeeper. She played for the teams of São Paulo FC,Santos FC and Clube Atlético Juventus.

== International career ==
Simone represented Brazil at the 1988 FIFA Women's Invitation Tournament.
