= Bebeto de Freitas =

Brazilian volleyball coach and football manager

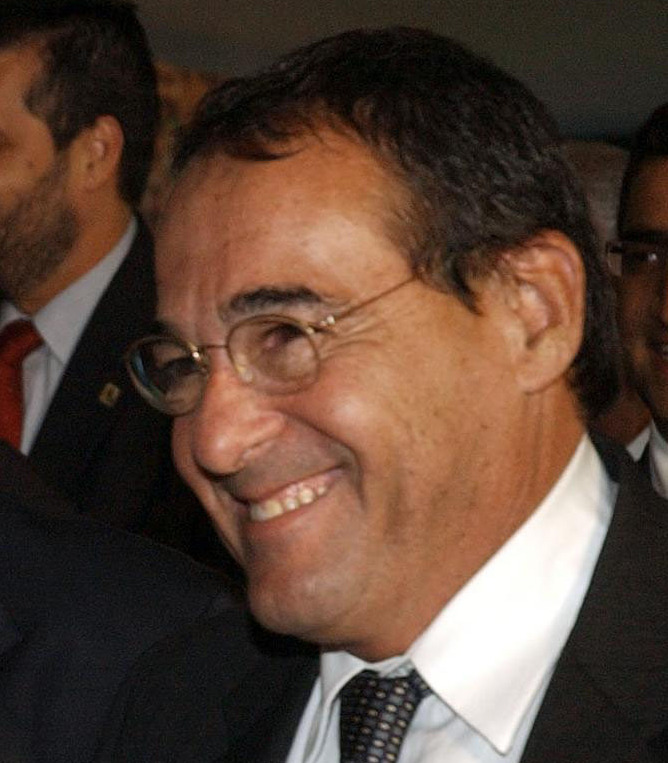
- Born: Paulo Roberto de Freitas; January 15, 1950
- Died: March 13, 2018 (aged 68)

Paulo Roberto de Freitas, best known as Bebeto (January 15, 1950 – March 13, 2018), was a Brazilian volleyball coach and football manager. He was the president of Botafogo FR football club.

In 2015, Bebeto was inducted into the International Volleyball Hall of Fame.

== Volleyball playing ==
As a volleyball player, Bebeto competed in the volleyball tournaments at the 1972 Summer Olympics in Munich and the 1976 Summer Olympics in Montreal.

== Volleyball coaching ==
Bebeto coached several Brazilian and Italian volleyball teams; as coach of Brazil men's national team, he won a silver medal at the 1984 Summer Olympics in Los Angeles. He won the 1998 FIVB World Championship with the Italian men's national team.

== Football management ==
Bebeto began his career as football manager for Clube Atlético Mineiro, moving to Botafogo in 2002, bringing the team back to Campeonato Brasileiro Série A in 2003.

== Personal life and death ==
Bebeto was born in Rio de Janeiro. He died on March 13, 2018, of a heart attack inside the Atlético Mineiro training center. He was 68.

== Education ==
Master's Degree 1992

Universidade Federal do Rio de Janeiro, S.A.

Master's Degree 2004

Fluminense Federal University
