= Milagres, Ceará =

Municipality in Ceará, Brazil

Milagres
- Municipality
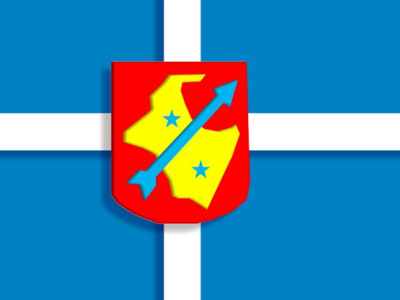
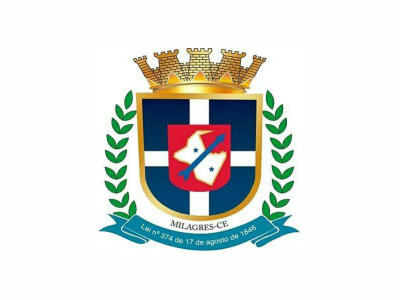
- Flag Coat of arms

- Location in Brazil
- Coordinates: 7°18′40″S 38°56′40″W
- Country: Brazil
- State: Ceará

Population (2020)
  - Total: 27,462
- Time zone: UTC−3 (BRT)

Milagres is a municipality in the state of Ceará in Brazil.

== See also ==
- List of municipalities in Ceará
