= 1998 FIVB Men's Volleyball World Championship =

1998 FIVB World Championship

Tournament details
- Host country: Japan
- Dates: 13–29 November
- Teams: 24
- Venues: 11 (in 11 host cities)
- Officially opened by: Akihito

Final positions
- Champions: Italy (3rd title)

Tournament awards
- MVP: (Spain) Rafael Pascual

The 1998 FIVB Men's World Championship was the fourteenth edition of the tournament, organised by the world's governing body, the FIVB. It was held from 13 to 29 November 1998 in Fukuoka, Kobe, Sendai, Sapporo, Kawasaki, Uozu, Hiroshima, Osaka, Chiba, Hamamatsu, and Tokyo, Japan.

== Teams ==
| Pool A | Pool B | Pool C | Pool D | Pool E | Pool F |
|---|---|---|---|---|---|
| Japan; South Korea; Spain; Egypt | Italy; United States; Canada; Thailand | Netherlands; China; Czech Republic; Ukraine | Cuba; Argentina; Poland; Iran | Brazil; Bulgaria; Greece; Algeria | Russia; Yugoslavia; Australia; Turkey |

== Qualification ==
| Africa (CAVB) | Asia and Oceania (AVC) | Europe (CEV) | North America (NORCECA) | South America (CSV) |
| Pool A Winners: Algeria; Pool B Winners: Egypt | Host Country: Japan; Pool C Winners: South Korea; Pool C Runners-up: Thailand; Pool D Winners: China; Pool D Runners-up: Iran; Pool E Winners: Australia | Pool F Winners: Italy; Pool F Runners-up: Turkey; Pool G Winners: Netherlands; Pool G Runners-up: Ukraine; Pool H Winners: Russia; Pool H Runners-up: Poland; Pool I Winners: Spain; Pool I Runners-up: Bulgaria; Pool J Winners: Yugoslavia; Pool J Runners-up: Greece; Pool K Winners: Czech Republic | Pool L Winners: Canada; Pool M Winners: United States; Playoff Winners: Cuba | Pool N Winners: Brazil; Pool N Runners-up: Argentina |

== Venues ==
- Marine Messe Fukuoka, Fukuoka – Pool A
- Kobe Green Arena, Kobe – Pool B
- Sendai City Gymnasium, Sendai – Pool C
- Makomanai Indoor Stadium, Sapporo – Pool D
- Todoroki Arena, Kawasaki – Pool E
- Uozu Techno Sports Dome, Uozu – Pool F
- Hiroshima Green Arena, Hiroshima – Pool G
- Namihaya Dome, Osaka – Pool G
- Makuhari Messe, Chiba – Pool H
- Hamamatsu Arena, Hamamatsu – Pool H
- Yoyogi National Gymnasium, Tokyo – Final round

== Results ==
=== First round ===
==== Pool A ====
| Pos | Team | Pld | W | L | Pts | SW | SL | SR | SPW | SPL | SPR | Qualification |
|---|---|---|---|---|---|---|---|---|---|---|---|---|
| 1 | Spain | 3 | 3 | 0 | 6 | 9 | 4 | 2.250 | 179 | 150 | 1.193 | Second round |
| 2 | Japan | 3 | 2 | 1 | 5 | 6 | 3 | 2.000 | 123 | 97 | 1.268 | Second round |
| 3 | South Korea | 3 | 1 | 2 | 4 | 5 | 6 | 0.833 | 130 | 134 | 0.970 | Second round |
| 4 | Egypt | 3 | 0 | 3 | 3 | 2 | 9 | 0.222 | 107 | 158 | 0.677 | |

| Date | Time | | Score | | Set 1 | Set 2 | Set 3 | Set 4 | Set 5 | Total |
|---|---|---|---|---|---|---|---|---|---|---|
| 13 Nov | 15:30 | South Korea | 3–0 | Egypt | 15–10 | 15–7 | 15–6 | | | 45–23 |
| 13 Nov | 18:30 | Spain | 3–0 | Japan | 15–11 | 15–9 | 15–13 | | | 45–33 |
| 14 Nov | 15:30 | South Korea | 2–3 | Spain | 15–7 | 6–15 | 15–13 | 13–15 | 14–16 | 63–66 |
| 14 Nov | 18:40 | Egypt | 0–3 | Japan | 9–15 | 12–15 | 9–15 | | | 30–45 |
| 15 Nov | 12:00 | Spain | 3–2 | Egypt | 9–15 | 13–15 | 15–9 | 15–1 | 16–14 | 68–54 |
| 15 Nov | 15:00 | Japan | 3–0 | South Korea | 15–8 | 15–12 | 15–2 | | | 45–22 |

==== Pool B ====
| Pos | Team | Pld | W | L | Pts | SW | SL | SR | SPW | SPL | SPR | Qualification |
|---|---|---|---|---|---|---|---|---|---|---|---|---|
| 1 | Italy | 3 | 3 | 0 | 6 | 9 | 1 | 9.000 | 147 | 63 | 2.333 | Second round |
| 2 | United States | 3 | 2 | 1 | 5 | 7 | 4 | 1.750 | 130 | 121 | 1.074 | Second round |
| 3 | Canada | 3 | 1 | 2 | 4 | 4 | 6 | 0.667 | 121 | 108 | 1.120 | Second round |
| 4 | Thailand | 3 | 0 | 3 | 3 | 0 | 9 | 0.000 | 29 | 135 | 0.215 | |

| Date | Time | | Score | | Set 1 | Set 2 | Set 3 | Set 4 | Set 5 | Total |
|---|---|---|---|---|---|---|---|---|---|---|
| 13 Nov | 14:15 | Canada | 0–3 | Italy | 10–15 | 13–15 | 2–15 | | | 25–45 |
| 13 Nov | 17:15 | United States | 3–0 | Thailand | 15–3 | 15–9 | 15–1 | | | 45–13 |
| 14 Nov | 14:15 | Thailand | 0–3 | Italy | 0–15 | 2–15 | 3–15 | | | 5–45 |
| 14 Nov | 16:00 | United States | 3–1 | Canada | 6–15 | 15–9 | 16–14 | 15–13 | | 52–51 |
| 15 Nov | 14:15 | Canada | 3–0 | Thailand | 15–3 | 15–7 | 15–1 | | | 45–11 |
| 15 Nov | 16:00 | Italy | 3–1 | United States | 15–4 | 15–7 | 12–15 | 15–7 | | 57–33 |

==== Pool C ====
| Pos | Team | Pld | W | L | Pts | SW | SL | SR | SPW | SPL | SPR | Qualification |
|---|---|---|---|---|---|---|---|---|---|---|---|---|
| 1 | Netherlands | 3 | 3 | 0 | 6 | 9 | 2 | 4.500 | 157 | 108 | 1.454 | Second round |
| 2 | China | 3 | 2 | 1 | 5 | 7 | 4 | 1.750 | 146 | 131 | 1.115 | Second round |
| 3 | Ukraine | 3 | 1 | 2 | 4 | 4 | 6 | 0.667 | 119 | 121 | 0.983 | Second round |
| 4 | Czech Republic | 3 | 0 | 3 | 3 | 1 | 9 | 0.111 | 86 | 148 | 0.581 | |

| Date | Time | | Score | | Set 1 | Set 2 | Set 3 | Set 4 | Set 5 | Total |
|---|---|---|---|---|---|---|---|---|---|---|
| 13 Nov | 14:00 | China | 3–1 | Ukraine | 14–16 | 15–13 | 15–12 | 15–8 | | 59–49 |
| 13 Nov | 18:00 | Czech Republic | 1–3 | Netherlands | 9–15 | 15–13 | 13–15 | 4–15 | | 41–58 |
| 14 Nov | 14:00 | Ukraine | 0–3 | Netherlands | 8–15 | 10–15 | 7–15 | | | 25–45 |
| 14 Nov | 17:00 | China | 3–0 | Czech Republic | 15–9 | 15–9 | 15–10 | | | 45–28 |
| 15 Nov | 11:00 | Czech Republic | 0–3 | Ukraine | 5–15 | 6–15 | 6–15 | | | 17–45 |
| 15 Nov | 14:00 | Netherlands | 3–1 | China | 9–15 | 15–11 | 15–7 | 15–9 | | 54–42 |

==== Pool D ====
| Pos | Team | Pld | W | L | Pts | SW | SL | SR | SPW | SPL | SPR | Qualification |
|---|---|---|---|---|---|---|---|---|---|---|---|---|
| 1 | Cuba | 3 | 3 | 0 | 6 | 9 | 0 | MAX | 135 | 68 | 1.985 | Second round |
| 2 | Argentina | 3 | 2 | 1 | 5 | 6 | 4 | 1.500 | 128 | 100 | 1.280 | Second round |
| 3 | Poland | 3 | 1 | 2 | 4 | 4 | 6 | 0.667 | 111 | 119 | 0.933 | |
| 4 | Iran | 3 | 0 | 3 | 3 | 0 | 9 | 0.000 | 48 | 135 | 0.356 | |

| Date | Time | | Score | | Set 1 | Set 2 | Set 3 | Set 4 | Set 5 | Total |
|---|---|---|---|---|---|---|---|---|---|---|
| 13 Nov | 15:00 | Argentina | 3–0 | Iran | 15–9 | 15–3 | 15–7 | | | 45–19 |
| 13 Nov | 18:00 | Poland | 0–3 | Cuba | 10–15 | 9–15 | 11–15 | | | 30–45 |
| 14 Nov | 13:00 | Iran | 0–3 | Cuba | 2–15 | 5–15 | 7–15 | | | 14–45 |
| 14 Nov | 16:00 | Argentina | 3–1 | Poland | 14–16 | 15–5 | 15–7 | 15–8 | | 59–36 |
| 15 Nov | 12:00 | Poland | 3–0 | Iran | 15–5 | 15–2 | 15–8 | | | 45–15 |
| 15 Nov | 15:00 | Cuba | 3–0 | Argentina | 15–7 | 15–8 | 15–9 | | | 45–24 |

==== Pool E ====
| Pos | Team | Pld | W | L | Pts | SW | SL | SR | SPW | SPL | SPR | Qualification |
|---|---|---|---|---|---|---|---|---|---|---|---|---|
| 1 | Brazil | 3 | 3 | 0 | 6 | 9 | 0 | MAX | 135 | 59 | 2.288 | Second round |
| 2 | Bulgaria | 3 | 2 | 1 | 5 | 6 | 5 | 1.200 | 130 | 140 | 0.929 | Second round |
| 3 | Greece | 3 | 1 | 2 | 4 | 5 | 7 | 0.714 | 147 | 159 | 0.925 | Second round |
| 4 | Algeria | 3 | 0 | 3 | 3 | 1 | 9 | 0.111 | 94 | 148 | 0.635 | |

| Date | Time | | Score | | Set 1 | Set 2 | Set 3 | Set 4 | Set 5 | Total |
|---|---|---|---|---|---|---|---|---|---|---|
| 13 Nov | 15:30 | Bulgaria | 3–0 | Algeria | 15–6 | 15–12 | 15–13 | | | 45–31 |
| 13 Nov | 18:30 | Greece | 0–3 | Brazil | 6–15 | 13–15 | 6–15 | | | 25–45 |
| 14 Nov | 15:30 | Algeria | 0–3 | Brazil | 2–15 | 8–15 | 6–15 | | | 16–45 |
| 14 Nov | 18:30 | Bulgaria | 3–2 | Greece | 15–11 | 10–15 | 16–14 | 11–15 | 15–9 | 67–64 |
| 15 Nov | 15:30 | Greece | 3–1 | Algeria | 15–9 | 15–11 | 13–15 | 15–12 | | 58–47 |
| 15 Nov | 18:30 | Brazil | 3–0 | Bulgaria | 15–4 | 15–8 | 15–6 | | | 45–18 |

==== Pool F ====
| Pos | Team | Pld | W | L | Pts | SW | SL | SR | SPW | SPL | SPR | Qualification |
|---|---|---|---|---|---|---|---|---|---|---|---|---|
| 1 | Yugoslavia | 3 | 3 | 0 | 6 | 9 | 2 | 4.500 | 165 | 103 | 1.602 | Second round |
| 2 | Russia | 3 | 2 | 1 | 5 | 8 | 3 | 2.667 | 154 | 113 | 1.363 | Second round |
| 3 | Australia | 3 | 1 | 2 | 4 | 3 | 8 | 0.375 | 106 | 152 | 0.697 | |
| 4 | Turkey | 3 | 0 | 3 | 3 | 2 | 9 | 0.222 | 96 | 153 | 0.627 | |

| Date | Time | | Score | | Set 1 | Set 2 | Set 3 | Set 4 | Set 5 | Total |
|---|---|---|---|---|---|---|---|---|---|---|
| 13 Nov | 14:00 | Yugoslavia | 3–0 | Australia | 16–14 | 15–5 | 15–4 | | | 46–23 |
| 13 Nov | 16:30 | Turkey | 0–3 | Russia | 6–15 | 7–15 | 6–15 | | | 19–45 |
| 14 Nov | 13:00 | Australia | 0–3 | Russia | 4–15 | 7–15 | 9–15 | | | 20–45 |
| 14 Nov | 15:30 | Yugoslavia | 3–0 | Turkey | 15–7 | 15–3 | 15–6 | | | 45–16 |
| 15 Nov | 13:00 | Turkey | 2–3 | Australia | 8–15 | 15–9 | 15–9 | 13–15 | 10–15 | 61–63 |
| 15 Nov | 15:30 | Russia | 2–3 | Yugoslavia | 16–14 | 16–14 | 6–15 | 12–15 | 14–16 | 64–74 |

=== Second round ===
==== Pool G ====
| Pos | Team | Pld | W | L | Pts | SW | SL | SR | SPW | SPL | SPR | Qualification |
|---|---|---|---|---|---|---|---|---|---|---|---|---|
| 1 | Brazil | 7 | 7 | 0 | 14 | 21 | 3 | 7.000 | 351 | 210 | 1.671 | Finals |
| 2 | Cuba | 7 | 6 | 1 | 13 | 18 | 8 | 2.250 | 348 | 289 | 1.204 | Finals |
| 3 | Spain | 7 | 4 | 3 | 11 | 17 | 12 | 1.417 | 367 | 344 | 1.067 | 5th–8th places |
| 4 | Bulgaria | 7 | 4 | 3 | 11 | 14 | 14 | 1.000 | 361 | 365 | 0.989 | 5th–8th places |
| 5 | Canada | 7 | 3 | 4 | 10 | 11 | 16 | 0.688 | 291 | 362 | 0.804 | 9th–12th places |
| 6 | Argentina | 7 | 2 | 5 | 9 | 11 | 16 | 0.688 | 320 | 334 | 0.958 | 9th–12th places |
| 7 | South Korea | 7 | 2 | 5 | 9 | 7 | 18 | 0.389 | 266 | 340 | 0.782 | |
| 8 | Japan | 7 | 0 | 7 | 7 | 9 | 21 | 0.429 | 358 | 418 | 0.856 | |

| Date | Time | | Score | | Set 1 | Set 2 | Set 3 | Set 4 | Set 5 | Total |
|---|---|---|---|---|---|---|---|---|---|---|
| 18 Nov | 10:00 | Spain | 3–0 | South Korea | 15–7 | 15–6 | 15–11 | | | 45–24 |
| 18 Nov | 12:30 | Canada | 0–3 | Brazil | 6–15 | 9–15 | 3–15 | | | 18–45 |
| 18 Nov | 15:30 | Bulgaria | 1–3 | Cuba | 12–15 | 16–17 | 15–13 | 4–15 | | 47–60 |
| 18 Nov | 18:30 | Japan | 1–3 | Argentina | 12–15 | 12–15 | 15–12 | 10–15 | | 49–57 |
| 19 Nov | 10:00 | Cuba | 3–1 | Canada | 15–10 | 10–15 | 15–12 | 15–5 | | 55–42 |
| 19 Nov | 12:50 | Argentina | 2–3 | Bulgaria | 8–15 | 17–16 | 7–15 | 15–10 | 9–15 | 56–71 |
| 19 Nov | 15:50 | South Korea | 0–3 | Brazil | 13–15 | 5–15 | 9–15 | | | 27–45 |
| 19 Nov | 18:30 | Spain | 3–2 | Japan | 15–5 | 13–15 | 15–8 | 11–15 | 15–12 | 69–55 |
| 21 Nov | 10:00 | Bulgaria | 0–3 | Spain | 15–17 | 4–15 | 11–15 | | | 30–47 |
| 21 Nov | 12:30 | Canada | 3–1 | Argentina | 15-11 | 10-15 | 15-4 | 15-6 | | 55-36 |
| 21 Nov | 15:00 | South Korea | 0–3 | Cuba | 13–15 | 6–15 | 7–15 | | | 26–45 |
| 21 Nov | 18:00 | Japan | 0–3 | Brazil | 11–15 | 9–15 | 13–15 | | | 33–45 |
| 22 Nov | 10:00 | Argentina | 3–0 | South Korea | 15–13 | 15–10 | 15–5 | | | 45–28 |
| 22 Nov | 12:30 | Spain | 2–3 | Canada | 15–11 | 9–15 | 15–12 | 14–16 | 16–18 | 69–72 |
| 22 Nov | 15:45 | Brazil | 3–1 | Bulgaria | 16–17 | 15–7 | 15–5 | 15–12 | | 61–41 |
| 22 Nov | 19:05 | Cuba | 3–1 | Japan | 15–9 | 12–15 | 15–10 | 17–16 | | 59–50 |
| 24 Nov | 10:00 | Spain | 3–1 | Argentina | 6–15 | 15–6 | 17–15 | 15–5 | | 53–41 |
| 24 Nov | 12:50 | Cuba | 0–3 | Brazil | 11–15 | 7–15 | 2–15 | | | 20–45 |
| 24 Nov | 15:30 | Canada | 0–3 | Bulgaria | 6–15 | 9–15 | 12–15 | | | 27–45 |
| 24 Nov | 18:30 | South Korea | 3–2 | Japan | 15–13 | 15–8 | 8–15 | 9–15 | 15–12 | 62–63 |
| 25 Nov | 10:00 | Spain | 2–3 | Cuba | 15–12 | 4–15 | 5–15 | 15–7 | 12–15 | 51–64 |
| 25 Nov | 12:30 | Brazil | 3–1 | Argentina | 15–11 | 7–15 | 15–2 | 15–10 | | 52–38 |
| 25 Nov | 15:30 | Bulgaria | 3–1 | South Korea | 11–15 | 15–10 | 15–8 | 16–14 | | 57–47 |
| 25 Nov | 18:30 | Japan | 1–3 | Canada | 15–11 | 8–15 | 9–15 | 9–15 | | 41–56 |
| 26 Nov | 10:00 | Cuba | 3–0 | Argentina | 15–12 | 15–4 | 15–12 | | | 45–28 |
| 26 Nov | 12:30 | Spain | 1–3 | Brazil | 4–15 | 15–13 | 5–15 | 9–15 | | 33–58 |
| 26 Nov | 15:30 | South Korea | 3–1 | Canada | 7–15 | 15–9 | 15–11 | 15–5 | | 52–40 |
| 26 Nov | 18:30 | Japan | 2–3 | Bulgaria | 15–10 | 15–17 | 12–15 | 15–13 | 10–15 | 67–70 |

==== Pool H ====
| Pos | Team | Pld | W | L | Pts | SW | SL | SR | SPW | SPL | SPR | Qualification |
|---|---|---|---|---|---|---|---|---|---|---|---|---|
| 1 | Yugoslavia | 7 | 6 | 1 | 13 | 19 | 4 | 4.750 | 323 | 201 | 1.607 | Finals |
| 2 | Italy | 7 | 6 | 1 | 13 | 18 | 4 | 4.500 | 319 | 165 | 1.933 | Finals |
| 3 | Russia | 7 | 6 | 1 | 13 | 19 | 8 | 2.375 | 365 | 299 | 1.221 | 5th–8th places |
| 4 | Netherlands | 7 | 4 | 3 | 11 | 12 | 10 | 1.200 | 260 | 243 | 1.070 | 5th–8th places |
| 5 | United States | 7 | 2 | 5 | 9 | 10 | 15 | 0.667 | 282 | 314 | 0.898 | 9th–12th places |
| 6 | Ukraine | 7 | 2 | 5 | 9 | 8 | 18 | 0.444 | 279 | 338 | 0.825 | 9th–12th places |
| 7 | Greece | 7 | 1 | 6 | 8 | 6 | 19 | 0.316 | 214 | 351 | 0.610 | |
| 8 | China | 7 | 1 | 6 | 8 | 5 | 19 | 0.263 | 218 | 349 | 0.625 | |

| Date | Time | | Score | | Set 1 | Set 2 | Set 3 | Set 4 | Set 5 | Total |
|---|---|---|---|---|---|---|---|---|---|---|
| 18 Nov | 10:00 | United States | 2–3 | Russia | 15–13 | 13–15 | 15–12 | 7–15 | 7–15 | 57–70 |
| 18 Nov | 13:45 | Greece | 0–3 | Netherlands | 2–15 | 8–15 | 4–15 | | | 14–45 |
| 18 Nov | 15:30 | China | 0–3 | Yugoslavia | 4–15 | 5–15 | 4–15 | | | 13–45 |
| 18 Nov | 18:30 | Ukraine | 0–3 | Italy | 7–15 | 12–15 | 3–15 | | | 22–45 |
| 19 Nov | 10:00 | Yugoslavia | 3–1 | Greece | 11–15 | 15–3 | 15–9 | 15–5 | | 56–32 |
| 19 Nov | 12:30 | Russia | 3–1 | China | 15–8 | 16–17 | 17–16 | 15–9 | | 63–50 |
| 19 Nov | 15:30 | Netherlands | 3–1 | Ukraine | 14–16 | 15–11 | 15–8 | 16–14 | | 60–49 |
| 19 Nov | 18:30 | Italy | 3–0 | United States | 15–6 | 15–2 | 15–12 | | | 45–20 |
| 21 Nov | 10:00 | Greece | 1–3 | Russia | 15–12 | 6–15 | 11–15 | 6–15 | | 38–57 |
| 21 Nov | 12:30 | Ukraine | 0–3 | Yugoslavia | 9–15 | 10–15 | 1–15 | | | 20–45 |
| 21 Nov | 15:00 | United States | 0–3 | Netherlands | 12–15 | 6–15 | 11–15 | | | 29–45 |
| 21 Nov | 18:00 | China | 0–3 | Italy | 5–15 | 4–15 | 5–15 | | | 14–45 |
| 22 Nov | 10:00 | Yugoslavia | 3–0 | United States | 15–6 | 15–10 | 15–8 | | | 45–24 |
| 22 Nov | 12:30 | Russia | 3–0 | Ukraine | 17–15 | 15–6 | 15–6 | | | 47–27 |
| 22 Nov | 15:00 | Italy | 3–0 | Greece | 15–5 | 15–13 | 15–1 | | | 45–19 |
| 22 Nov | 18:00 | Netherlands | 3–0 | China | 15–5 | 15–3 | 15–8 | | | 45–16 |
| 24 Nov | 10:00 | Yugoslavia | 3–0 | Netherlands | 15–9 | 15–4 | 15–13 | | | 45–26 |
| 24 Nov | 12:30 | Greece | 3–1 | China | 12–15 | 15–11 | 15–8 | 15–12 | | 57–46 |
| 24 Nov | 15:30 | Ukraine | 3–2 | United States | 15–12 | 4–15 | 15–12 | 6–15 | 15–8 | 55–62 |
| 24 Nov | 18:30 | Italy | 3–1 | Russia | 15–3 | 15–8 | 11–15 | 15–9 | | 56–35 |
| 25 Nov | 10:00 | United States | 3–0 | Greece | 15–9 | 15–11 | 15–11 | | | 45–31 |
| 25 Nov | 12:35 | China | 3–1 | Ukraine | 15–10 | 10–15 | 15–10 | 16–14 | | 56–49 |
| 25 Nov | 15:30 | Italy | 0–3 | Yugoslavia | 12–15 | 13–15 | 13–15 | | | 38–45 |
| 25 Nov | 18:30 | Netherlands | 0–3 | Russia | 6–15 | 12–15 | 11–15 | | | 29–45 |
| 26 Nov | 10:00 | United States | 3–0 | China | 15–11 | 15–8 | 15–4 | | | 45–23 |
| 26 Nov | 12:30 | Ukraine | 3–1 | Greece | 15–3 | 12–15 | 15–3 | 15–2 | | 57–23 |
| 26 Nov | 15:30 | Russia | 3–1 | Yugoslavia | 3–15 | 15–13 | 15–3 | 15–11 | | 48–42 |
| 26 Nov | 18:30 | Italy | 3–0 | Netherlands | 15–2 | 15–7 | 15–1 | | | 45–10 |

=== Final round ===
==== 9th–12th places ====
9th–12th semifinals
28 November – Tokyo
Argentina | 2
United States | 3
28 November – Tokyo
Canada | 0
Ukraine | 3

9th place
29 November – Tokyo
United States | 3
Ukraine | 0
11th place
29 November – Tokyo
Argentina | 3
Canada | 0

===== 9th–12th semifinals =====
| Date | Time | | Score | | Set 1 | Set 2 | Set 3 | Set 4 | Set 5 | Total |
|---|---|---|---|---|---|---|---|---|---|---|
| 28 Nov | 12:00 | Argentina | 2–3 | United States | 10–15 | 11–15 | 15–11 | 15–13 | 9–15 | 60–69 |
| 28 Nov | 15:15 | Canada | 0–3 | Ukraine | 11–15 | 13–15 | 11–15 | | | 35–45 |

===== 11th place match =====
| Date | Time | | Score | | Set 1 | Set 2 | Set 3 | Set 4 | Set 5 | Total |
|---|---|---|---|---|---|---|---|---|---|---|
| 29 Nov | 10:00 | Argentina | 3–0 | Canada | 15–7 | 15–10 | 15–6 | | | 45–23 |

===== 9th place match =====
| Date | Time | | Score | | Set 1 | Set 2 | Set 3 | Set 4 | Set 5 | Total |
|---|---|---|---|---|---|---|---|---|---|---|
| 29 Nov | 16:00 | United States | 3–0 | Ukraine | 16–14 | 15–12 | 15–10 | | | 46–36 |

==== 5th–8th places ====
5th–8th semifinals
28 November – Tokyo
Spain | 2
Netherlands | 3
28 November – Tokyo
Bulgaria | 0
Russia | 3

5th place
29 November – Tokyo
Netherlands | 0
Russia | 3
7th place
29 November – Tokyo
Spain | 1
Bulgaria | 3

===== 5th–8th semifinals =====
| Date | Time | | Score | | Set 1 | Set 2 | Set 3 | Set 4 | Set 5 | Total |
|---|---|---|---|---|---|---|---|---|---|---|
| 28 Nov | 12:00 | Bulgaria | 0–3 | Russia | 13–15 | 2–15 | 7–15 | | | 22–45 |
| 28 Nov | 15:00 | Spain | 2–3 | Netherlands | 15–13 | 17–16 | 12–15 | 10–15 | 10–15 | 64–74 |

===== 7th place match =====
| Date | Time | | Score | | Set 1 | Set 2 | Set 3 | Set 4 | Set 5 | Total |
|---|---|---|---|---|---|---|---|---|---|---|
| 29 Nov | 15:00 | Spain | 1–3 | Bulgaria | 11–15 | 7–15 | 15–12 | 11–15 | | 44–57 |

===== 5th place match =====
| Date | Time | | Score | | Set 1 | Set 2 | Set 3 | Set 4 | Set 5 | Total |
|---|---|---|---|---|---|---|---|---|---|---|
| 29 Nov | 12:00 | Netherlands | 0–3 | Russia | 7–15 | 12–15 | 12–15 | | | 31–45 |

==== Finals ====
Semifinals
29 November – Tokyo
Yugoslavia | 3
Cuba | 1
28 November – Tokyo
Brazil | 2
Italy | 3

Final
29 November – Tokyo
Yugoslavia | 0
Italy | 3
3rd place
29 November – Tokyo
Cuba | 3
Brazil | 1

===== semifinals =====
| Date | Time | | Score | | Set 1 | Set 2 | Set 3 | Set 4 | Set 5 | Total |
|---|---|---|---|---|---|---|---|---|---|---|
| 28 Nov | 18:00 | Yugoslavia | 3–1 | Cuba | 15–3 | 15–12 | 14–16 | 15–10 | | 59–41 |
| 28 Nov | 19:05 | Brazil | 2–3 | Italy | 10–15 | 15–13 | 11–15 | 15–10 | 10–15 | 61–68 |

===== 3rd place match =====
| Date | Time | | Score | | Set 1 | Set 2 | Set 3 | Set 4 | Set 5 | Total |
|---|---|---|---|---|---|---|---|---|---|---|
| 29 Nov | 15:00 | Cuba | 3–1 | Brazil | 12–15 | 15–6 | 15–11 | 15–12 | | 57–44 |

===== Final =====
| Date | Time | | Score | | Set 1 | Set 2 | Set 3 | Set 4 | Set 5 | Total |
|---|---|---|---|---|---|---|---|---|---|---|
| 29 Nov | 18:00 | Yugoslavia | 0–3 | Italy | 12–15 | 5–15 | 10–15 | | | 27–45 |

== Final standing ==
| Rank | Team |
|---|---|
| 1st place, gold medalist(s) | Italy |
| 2nd place, silver medalist(s) | Yugoslavia |
| 3rd place, bronze medalist(s) | Cuba |
| 4 | Brazil |
| 5 | Russia |
| 6 | Netherlands |
| 7 | Bulgaria |
| 8 | Spain |
| 9 | United States |
| 10 | Ukraine |
| 11 | Argentina |
| 12 | Canada |
| 13 | Greece |
| 13 | South Korea |
| 15 | China |
| 15 | Japan |
| 17 | Australia |
| 17 | Poland |
| 19 | Algeria |
| 19 | Czech Republic |
| 19 | Egypt |
| 19 | Iran |
| 19 | Thailand |
| 19 | Turkey |

1998 Men's World champions

Italy
3rd title

Team roster
Marco Bracci, Mirko Corsano, Alessandro Fei, Andrea Gardini, Andrea Giani, Ferdinando De Giorgi, Pasquale Gravina, Marco Meoni, Samuele Papi, Michele Pasinato, Simone Rosalba, Andrea Sartoretti
Head coach
Bebeto

== Awards ==
- Most valuable player
  (Spain) Rafael Pascual
- Best scorer
  (Spain) Rafael Pascual
- Best spiker
  (Argentina) Marcos Milinkovic
- Best blocker
  (Brazil) Gustavo Endres
- Best server
  (Federal Republic of Yugoslavia) Goran Vujević
- Best setter
  (Cuba) Raúl Diago
- Best digger
  (United States) Erik Sullivan
- Best receiver
  (Cuba) Rodolfo Sánchez
- Best coach
  (Brazil) Bebeto de Freias (Italy)
- Most Creative Coach
  (Italy) Vincenzo Di Pinto (Spain)
