= D-Efeitos =

Brazilian street dance group

- Origin: São Paulo, São Paulo
- Genres: Street dance
- Years active: 2009–2013
- Members: André "Bidu" Luís; André "Dedo" Torres; Renan "Livi"; Guilherme "Riku"; Daniel "Juno"

D-Efeitos was a Brazilian street dance group. They rose to national fame after winning the first season of the reality talent show Qual o seu Talento, from SBT.

== The Group ==
=== Members ===
D-Efeitos (English: D-Effects) is part of the company "Discípulos do Ritmo (English: Disciples of Rhythm) and was formed by André Luís, André Torres and Renan in 2009 to compete in parallel.

=== Pre Qual é o Seu Talento? ===
According to Soldier, the troupe manager, the company is very known outside Brazil. "They came to revolutionize. They are very respected by Americans, Europeans and Asians", he assures.

Among other titles, D-Efeitos already won the Joinville Dance Festival (cited by the Guinness Book as the largest dance festival in the world) in the street dance category, with a mixture of all branches of street dance, choreographed a striking rhythm of music.

== Qual é o Seu Talento? ==
In mid-2009, the group auditioned on Qual é o Seu Talento? 1, then advanced to the São Paulo Round, Semi-Finals and Finals with all the judges heavily praised their performances throughout the competition.

The finale took place on December 16, 2009 and was a 90-minute special. Each judge had to buzzed out one out of the six remaining acts until only the final two remaining. D-Efeitos coming out as the winners, Magician Renner was the runner-up and singer Edu Porto came in third place. The group won a R$100,000 prize for their victory.

=== Post Qual é o Seu Talento? ===
D-Efeitos made two shows in São Paulo on May 12 and May 13, 2010, where the receive special guests at a concert, which took place at Teatro Brigadeiro, SP. WaziMu!, Cia. Kahal, Frank Ejara and Discípulos do Ritmo also attend the event.

Preceded by None	Qual é o Seu Talento? winner 2009	Succeeded by Júlia Gomes
