= André Vasco =

Brazilian actor

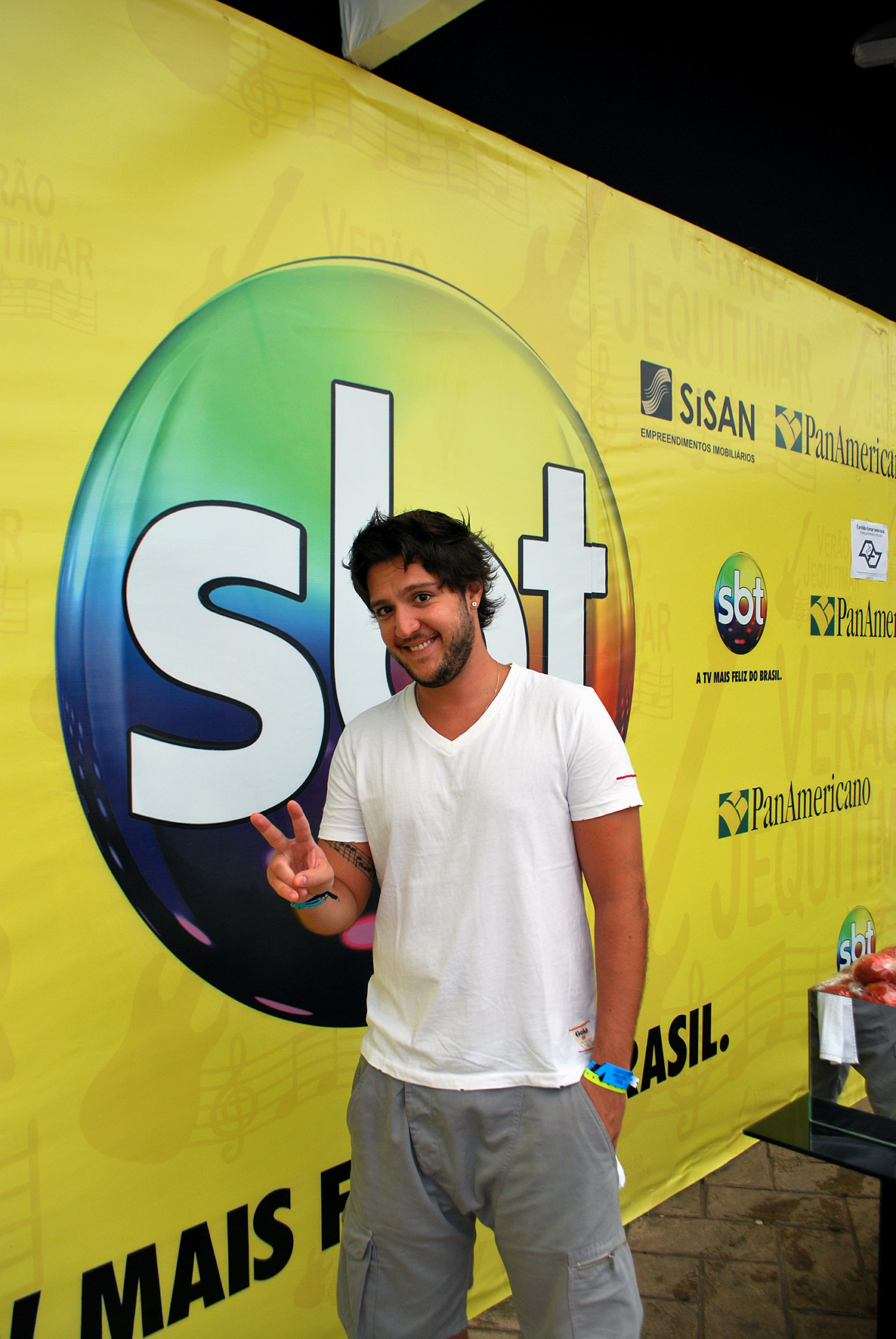
- Born: Guarulhos, Brazil
- Occupations: TV presenter, actor
- Years active: 2005–present

André Vasco is a Brazilian actor and television presenter. He is best known as the host of Qual é o Seu Talento?, the Brazilian version of the Got Talent series.

== Biography ==
Vasco began played violin in a youth orchestra at age 15, performing in various theaters of São Paulo, including numerous times at the Theatro Municipal.

== Career ==
- 2004 – Release Cronojoblife (MTV)
- 2005 – The Nadas (MTV)
- 2006 – Chapa Coco (MTV)
- 2006 – Tribunal de Pequenas Causas Musicais (MTV)
- 2006 – Aquecimento VMB 2006
- 2007 – Casal Neura (MTV)
- 2007 – Chá das Minas (MTV)
- 2007 – Site Virgula
- 2007 – Viva a Noite (SBT)
- 2008 – Band Verão (Band)
- 2008 – Prive 89 (89 FM)
- 2009–present – Qual é o Seu Talento? (SBT])
- 2009 – Teleton (SBT)
- 2010 – Teleton (SBT)
- 2015 – Band Folia (Band)
