= Carlos Eduardo Miranda =

Brazilian record producer (1962–2018)

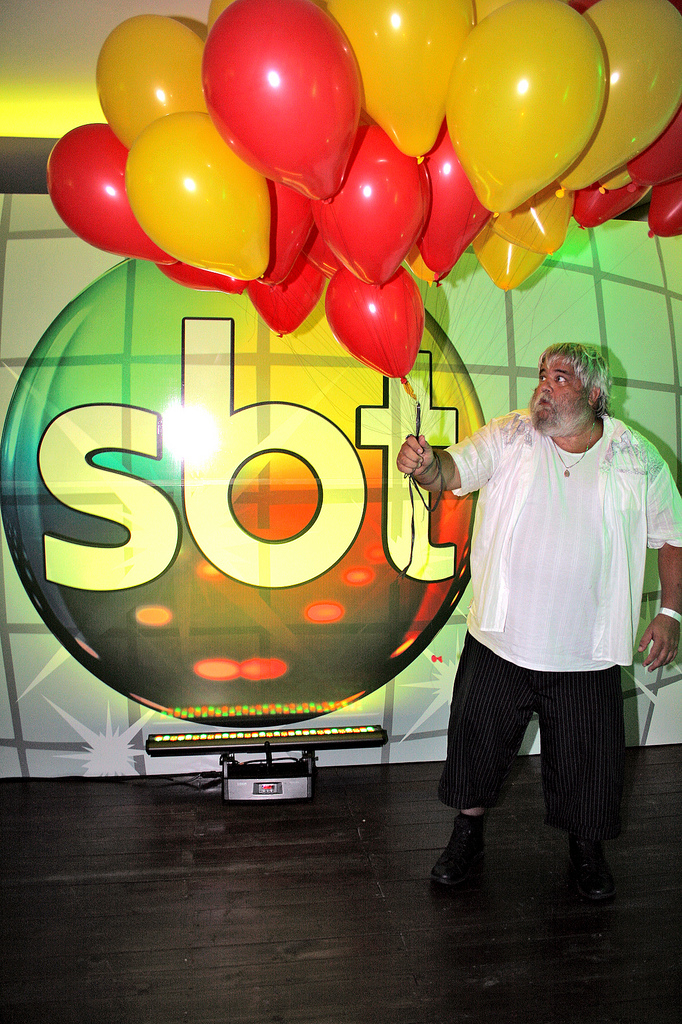
- Miranda in 2009
- Born: March 21, 1962; Porto Alegre, Rio Grande do Sul, Brazil
- Died: March 22, 2018 (aged 56); São Paulo, São Paulo, Brazil
- Occupations: Songwriter, musician, record producer, music and talent competition judge
- Years active: 1981–2018
- Spouse: Isabel Hammes
- Children: 1
- Musical career
- Genres: Punk rock
- Instruments: Electric guitar, keyboards
- Labels: Baratos Afins

Carlos Eduardo Miranda (March 21, 1962 – March 22, 2018), also known simply as Miranda or by his initials CEM, was a Brazilian songwriter, musician, record producer, and television music and talent competition judge.

== Biography ==
Carlos Eduardo Miranda was born in Porto Alegre, Rio Grande do Sul on March 21, 1962. He began his musical career in 1981 as a keyboardist for hard rock/heavy metal band Taranatiriça, and was, concomitantly, a member of the short-lived new wave project Urubu Rei. In 1984 he founded the punk/comedy rock band Atahualpa y us Panquis, of which he was its guitarist. After it broke up in 1993, shortly after releasing a single studio album, Miranda moved to São Paulo, where he began writing music reviews for music magazine Bizz. He signed his reviews with his initials, "CEM", playing with the fact that, in Portuguese, "cem" means "one hundred".

In 1994 Miranda teamed up with famous rock group Titãs to create the record label Banguela Records; even though it was very short-lived, Banguela was responsible for launching into fame bands such as Raimundos, Mundo Livre S/A, Kleiderman and Graforreia Xilarmônica. Other bands and artists launched into fame by Miranda include O Rappa, Skank, Cordel do Fogo Encantado, CSS, Móveis Coloniais de Acaju, Canto dos Malditos na Terra do Nunca and Gaby Amarantos.

Beginning in the mid-2000s and continuing through the early 2010s Miranda served as a judge for many music competition and talent shows such as Ídolos, Qual é o Seu Talento? and Esse Artista Sou Eu, invited by SBT. He died from unspecified causes on March 22, 2018; one day after his 56th birthday. He was survived by his wife, singer and vocal coach Isabel Hammes, and their then-2-year-old daughter, Agnes. The funeral took place at the Funeral Home complex in Bela Vista, São Paulo; according to the website of the magazine Quem, at the request of his wife the burial place was not disclosed.

== Discography ==
=== With Atahualpa y us Panquis ===
Year	Album
1989	Sanguinho Novo... Arnaldo Baptista Revisitado (compilation): Label: Eldorado; Format: Vinyl; Contributed with the song "Sitting on the Roadside"
1993	Agradeça ao Senhor: Label: Baratos Afins; Format: Vinyl
