= Captaincy of Ceará =

Former territorial division of Brazil (1534–1821)

Captaincy of Ceará Capitania do Ceará
- 1534–1821
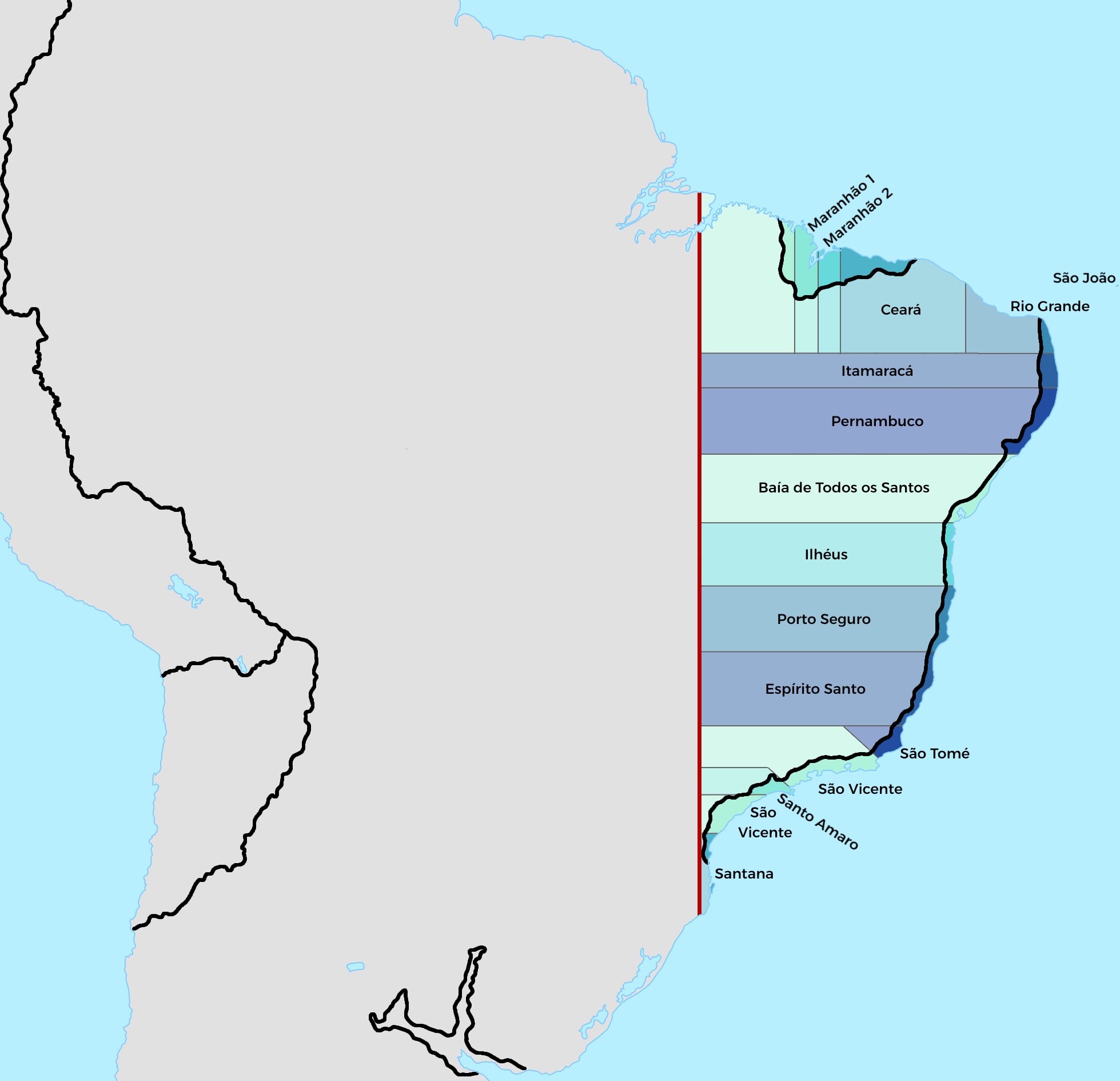
- Map of Brazil in 1534
- Status: Dependent territory
- Official languages: Portuguese
- Religion: Catholicism
- Today part of: Brazil

The Captaincy of Ceará (Portuguese: Capitania do Ceará) was one of the administrative subdivisions of Brazilian territory during the colonial period of Portuguese America. It was created in 1534 along with thirteen other hereditary captaincies and granted by John III, King of Portugal, to the so-called donatários. Initially, it was donated to Antônio Cardoso de Barros, subordinate of Fernão Álvares de Andrade and D. Antônio de Ataíde.

== History ==
=== Background ===
European colonization in America effectively began in 1534, when King John III divided the territory into fourteen hereditary captaincies and gave them to twelve donatários, who could exploit the land's resources, but in exchange had to populate and protect the regions. Since the 15th century, the system of captaincies had been used by the Portuguese Empire on the islands of Madeira and Cape Verde. In a letter addressed to Martim Afonso de Sousa in 1532, John III announced the decision to divide the Portuguese territory, beginning the donations in 1534.

There are three possible factors for the adoption of the captaincy system in Brazil: a response by the Portuguese monarchy to France's threat to its project of domination in America; the transfer of expenses with colonization from Portugal to the donatários, favoring the Crown in a situation of limited resources; and the conversion of the native population to Christianity, continuing the ideal of the Crusades.

=== Origins ===
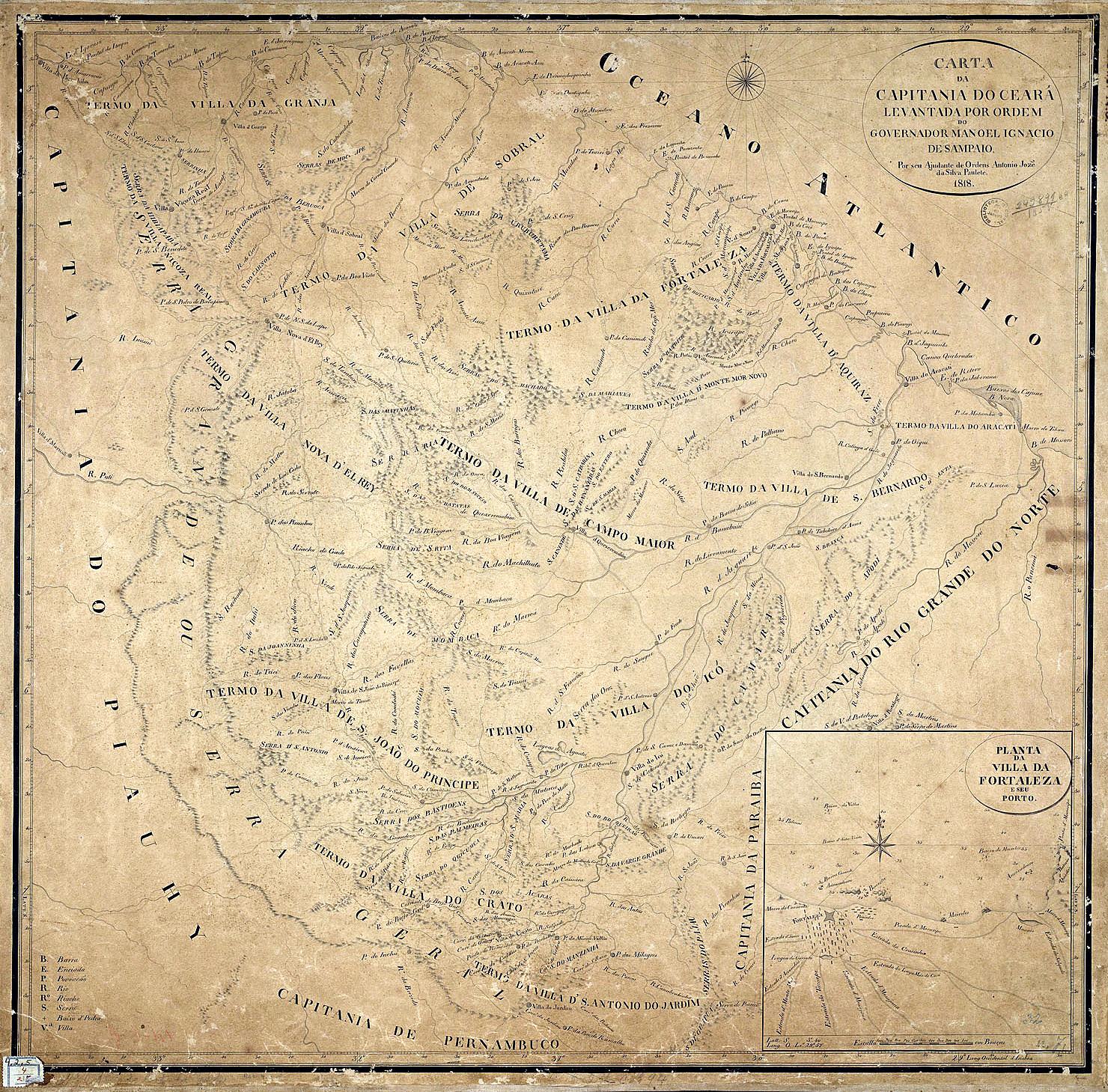
Letter from the Captaincy of Ceará, António José da Silva Paulet, 1818.

On November 20, 1535, the Captaincy of Ceará was donated to Antônio Cardoso de Barros, a subordinate of Fernão Álvares de Andrade and Antônio de Ataíde. For a variety of reasons, like his neighbors, he never occupied his plot. From 1590 onwards, French corsairs allied themselves with the Tabajara people of Ibiapaba and established a fortified factory on their coast to exploit brazilwood. Initially, the territory lay between the mouths of the Jaguaribe and Mundaú rivers.

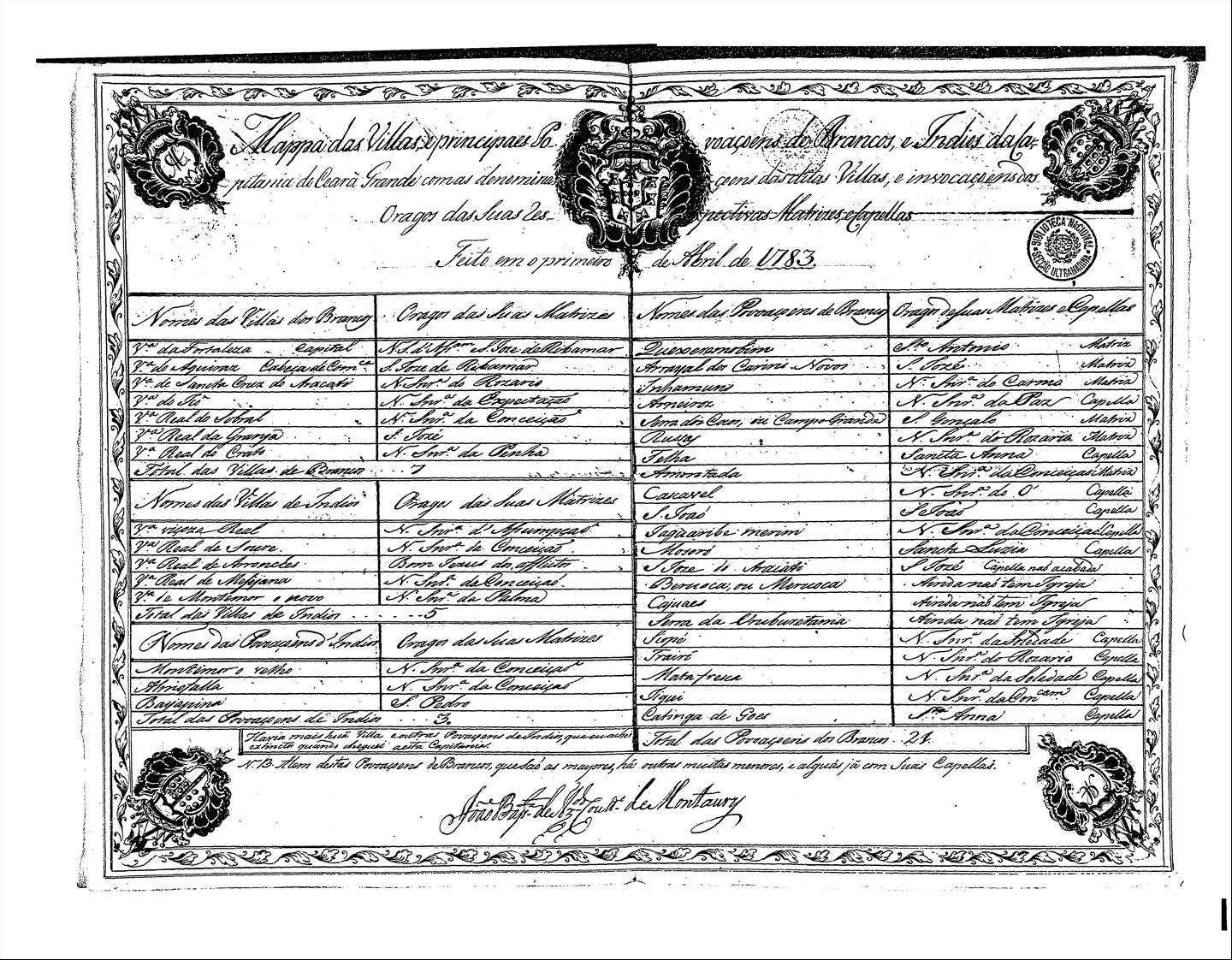
Map of the towns of the Captaincy of Ceará made by the Captain-Major of Ceará João Batista de Azevedo Coutinho de Montauri in 1783.

The first Portuguese expedition in the region was conducted in 1603 during the Philippine Dynasty, when Captain-Major Pero Coelho de Sousa traveled along the coast of Ceará leading eighty-six soldiers and two hundred indigenous people. The orders were "to discover the port of Jaguaribe by land, stop foreign trade, discover mines, offer peace to the natives" and to establish "settlements and forts in the places or ports that seem most suitable, seeking the friendship of the indigenous people, offering them peace and the law of the Church". This expedition founded the Fort of São Lourenço (1603), conquered and annihilated the French presence in Ibiapaba (1604) and established the Fort of São Tiago da Nova Lisboa (1604) at the mouth of the Ceará River, which was abandoned the following year (1605).

Shortly afterwards, faced with the French threat in the Captaincy of Maranhão, Governor Diogo de Meneses commissioned Captain-Major Martim Soares Moreno to establish a factory, provide strategic points, promote economic progress and catechize the natives on the coast of the Captaincy of Ceará. Accompanied by just six soldiers and a religious man who spoke the language, Moreno returned to the mouth of the Ceará River. With the help of the morubixaba Jacaúna, he built a new settlement on the same site as the old Fort of São Tiago and a chapel dedicated to Our Lady of Amparo, on January 20, 1612.

In 1621, the State of Maranhão was created, incorporating the captaincies of Grão-Pará, Ceará and Maranhão. During the second Dutch invasion of Brazil, Ceará remained occupied by the invaders from 1637 to 1654. From 1680 onwards, it became a subordinate captaincy to Pernambuco and was detached from the State of Maranhão. The captaincy of Ceará only achieved autonomy at the end of the 18th century, by royal charter of January 17, 1799.

On the eve of Brazil's independence, on February 28, 1821, the captaincy became a province and remained so until 1889, when it became the current state of Ceará with the Proclamation of the Republic.

=== Main donatários ===
- Pero Coelho de Sousa;
- Martim Soares Moreno;
- Diogo Coelho Albuquerque: During his rule, the Captaincy of Ceará lost part of its autonomy because Diogo Coelho de Albuquerque asked the Captain-Major of the Captaincy of Pernambuco, Francisco de Brito Freire, for help, and he took advantage of Ceará's weakness and annexed it to his territory; Ceará would only become autonomous again in 1799;
- Álvaro de Azevedo Barreto: During his rule, the Portuguese managed to expel the Dutch invaders definitively in 1654. The fort of Schoonenborch was occupied and baptized with the name Fortaleza de Nossa Senhora da Assunção. Our Lady of the Assumption became the patron saint of the Captaincy of Ceará;
- Jorge Correia da Silva: Knight of the Order of St. Benedict of Avis, he governed for three years and helped Father Antônio Vieira in the missions of the Serra da Ibiapaba during the 17th century;
- Sebastião de Sá: Granted a sesmaria in Barra do Ceará for the construction of a convent for the Confraternity of Our Lady of the Assumption;
- Bento de Macedo de Faria: During his government, he opened up trade in Ceará, including dealing with the Dutch who had abandoned the captaincy after the Portuguese reconquest;
- Fernão Carrilho;
- Pedro Lelou;
- Jorge de Barros Leite: Liberal politician and military officer who restored freedom to the Tapuia natives of the Araré village during his government;
- Gabriel da Silva Lago: He ordered the construction of a palisade to defend and protect the inhabitants of the Salgado River against the attacks of the natives, which gave rise to the current municipality of Icó;
- Manuel Francês: In 1726, he commissioned the first plan of the town of Fortaleza. For this reason, many consider him to be the founder of the city;
- João Batista Furtado: Advocated the construction of a new fortress in the Captaincy of Ceará, but never managed to get the project off the ground;
- Domingos Simões Jordão: During his government, he faced droughts and popular uprisings;
- Francisco de Miranda Costa: It was probably under his government that the town of Messejana was created. He also provided aid to the ecclesiastical judges of the captaincy;
- Luís Quaresma Dourado: He faced several wars between the natives and the allies of the Portuguese over the lands of the captaincy;
- Francisco Xavier de Miranda Henriques: Renovated the Fortress of Nossa Senhora da Assunção using his own salary;
- João Baltasar Quevedo Homem de Magalhães;
- Antônio José Vitoriano Borges da Fonseca;
- João Batista de Azevedo Coutinho de Montauri: He was one of the first to map the territory's rivers and towns. He also discovered the area's great salt potential and denounced, in his letters, the corruption of Ceará's ombudsmen, which was the main reason why the captaincy was not growing economically;
- Luís da Mota Feio e Torres;
- João Carlos Augusto;
- Luís Barba Alardo de Menezes;
- Manuel Inácio de Sampaio.

== See also ==
- History of Ceará
- Captaincies of Brazil
