= Macacos River =

Macacos River may refer to two rivers in Brazil:

- Macacos River (Ceará)
- Macacos River (Paraná)

== See also ==
- Macaco Branco River
- Macaco (disambiguation)
