= Umburanas, Ceará =

Village in Ceará, Brazil

Umburanas Imburanas, Emburanas
- District
- Location of Umburanas in the municipality of Mauriti
- Coordinates: 7°26′43″S 38°43′27″W
- Country: Brazil
- State: Ceará
- Municipality: Mauriti
- Settlement: c. 1800
- District created: December 4, 1933; 92 years ago
- Founder: Gregório do Espírito Santo
- Named for: Umburanas River

Area
  - Total: 167.70 km^{2} (64.75 sq mi)

Population (2022)
  - Total: 4,002
  - Density: 23.86/km^{2} (61.81/sq mi)
- Households: 1,360
- Boundaries: Mauriti, Palestina do Cariri, Coité, Conceição, Paraíba and Santa Inês, Paraíba

Umburanas is a district of the Brazilian municipality of Mauriti, located in the Cariri region of Ceará, in the southern part of the state, on the border with the state of Paraíba. According to the 2022 Demographic Census of the IBGE, its population was 4,002 inhabitants in 1,360 private households.

== Toponymy ==
Historically spelled as "Imburanas" and "Emburanas", the district takes its name from the Umburanas River, a watercourse in the region and a tributary of Porcos River. The name Umburanas derives from the Tupi term for the tree species Amburana cearensis, which was abundant in the region in the 18th century.

== History ==
=== 18th century ===
The locality has been documented and known since the 18th century. Originally inhabited by Indigenous groups, including Tapuias, the region was granted as a sesmaria on 29 December 1725 to Captain Antonio Mendes Lobato. At the time, the territory was defined by the presence of the Umburanas River, which marked its boundaries and gave the locality its name, while also enabling the expansion and development of agriculture and livestock raising.

=== 19th century ===
Gregório do Espírito Santo is regarded as its founder, having settled the locality in the late 18th and early 19th centuries, building the first brick house and the first sugar mill in the region.

In 1849, according to local tradition, devotion to the patron saint Saint Anne began. In 1855, the land endowment for the chapel was donated, while its construction was later associated with the passage of Father Ibiapina through the region. In 1858, the chapel was placed under the administration of Father Martinho de Luna e Mello, vicar and the first local teacher.

In 1871, a primary-school teaching position was established by Provincial Law No. 1,417, and was repealed in 1875 by Law No. 1,692.

In 1890, the municipality of Buriti Grande was created, having been separated from Milagres, and Umburanas became part of this new administration.

In 1896, by order of Major Joaquim Antonio Furtado, great-grandson of Gregório, the former chapel was enlarged, giving rise to the present temple, and the parish house was built.

=== 20th century ===
On 2 February 1931, Escola Santa Terezinha was inaugurated, the first public school of the village.

On 4 December 1933, the district was formally created and incorporated into the municipality of Mauriti through State Law No. 1,156.

=== Expansion of education (1955–1976) ===
In 1955, four new municipal isolated schools were established for the district seat and its nearby rural sites, followed later by three more.

In 1966, the first building of Joaquim Furtado Leite Municipal School was constructed.

In 1976, Major Joaquim Antonio Furtado Elementary School was built.

=== Municipal emancipation (1963–1965) ===
In 1963, the district was separated from Mauriti and elevated to the status of a municipality by State Law No. 6,913 of 17 December. On 14 December 1965, the municipality was abolished and reincorporated into Mauriti as a district by State Law No. 8,339.

== Infrastructure ==
=== Electrification (1965) ===
In 1965, the district was electrified through the Companhia de Energia Elétrica do Cariri (CELCA).

=== Transportation ===
The district is crossed by state highway CE-384, in the section known as Rodovia dos Romeiros, which connects the municipal seat to the border with Paraíba and links to PB-386 in the municipality of Conceição, Paraíba. Its paving was completed on 30 April 2003.

== See also ==
- Mauriti
- Ceará
- Porcos River
- List of municipalities in Ceará
