= List of rivers of Ceará =

List of rivers in Ceará (Brazilian State).

The list is arranged by drainage basin from east to west, with respective tributaries indented under each larger stream's name and ordered from downstream to upstream. All rivers in Ceará drain to the Atlantic Ocean.

== By Drainage Basin ==
- Jaguaribe River
  - Palhano River
  - Banabuiú River
    - Sitiá River
    - Quixeramobim River
      - Boa Viagem River
  - Figueiredo River
  - Sangue River
  - Salgado River
    - Porcos River
      - Jardim River
  - Truçu River
  - Cariús River
  - Conceição River
  - Jucá River
- Pirangi River
- Choró River
  - Pacoti River
  - Cangati River
- Cocó River
- São Gonçalo River
- Curu River
  - Caxitoré River
  - Canindé River
    - Seriema River
- Trairi River
- Mundaú River
  - Cruxati River
- Aracatiaçu River
  - Pajé River
- Aracatimirim River
- Acaraú River
  - Contendas River
  - Jacurutu River
  - Jaibaras River
  - Groaíras River
    - Cunhãmati River
  - Macacos River
  - Jatobá River
  - Feitosa River
- Jurema River
  - Tucunduba River
- Coreaú River
  - Itacolomi River
- Timonha River
- Ubatuba River
- Parnaíba River (Piauí)
  - Poti River
    - Macambira River (Inhuçu River)

== Alphabetically ==
- Acaraú River
- Aracatiaçu River
- Aracatimirim River
- Banabuiú River
- Boa Viagem River
- Cangati River
- Canindé River
- Cariús River
- Caxitoré River
- Choró River
- Cocó River
- Conceição River
- Contendas River
- Coreaú River
- Cruxati River
- Cunhãmati River
- Curu River
- Feitosa River
- Figueiredo River
- Groaíras River
- Itacolomi River
- Jacurutu River
- Jaguaribe River
- Jaibaras River
- Jardim River
- Jatobá River
- Jucá River
- Jurema River
- Macacos River
- Macambira River (Inhuçu River)
- Mundaú River
- Pacoti River
- Pajé River
- Palhano River
- Pirangi River
- Porcos River
- Poti River
- Quixeramobim River
- Salgado River
- Sangue River
- São Gonçalo River
- Seriema River
- Sitiá River
- Timonha River
- Trairi River
- Truçu River
- Tucunduba River
- Ubatuba River
