= Pajé River =

Location
- Country: Brazil

Physical characteristics
- Source
  - location: Ceará state
- Mouth: Aracatiaçu River
  - coordinates: 3°34′S 39°59′W

The Pajé River is a river of Ceará state in eastern Brazil.

== See also ==
- List of rivers of Ceará
