= Jatobá River =

Location
- Country: Brazil

Physical characteristics
- Source
  - location: Ceará state
- Mouth: Acaraú River
  - coordinates: 4°13′S 40°28′W

The Jatobá River is a river of Ceará state in eastern Brazil.

== See also ==
- List of rivers of Ceará
