= Jardim River =

Location
- Country: Brazil

Physical characteristics
- Source
  - location: Ceará state
- Mouth: Porcos River
  - coordinates: 7°37′S 38°53′W

The Jardim River is a river of Ceará state in eastern Brazil.

== See also ==
- List of rivers of Ceará
