= Macaco =

Macaco (Portuguese for "monkey" or "ape") may refer to:

- Macaco (band), a Spanish musical group formed in 1997
- Macaco (capoeira), a martial arts technique in capoeira
- Macaco (term) or macaca, a Portuguese racial slur
- Macaco, a comic strip, character, and children's magazine created by K-Hito
- Macaco River, a tributary of the Três Voltas River in Santa Catarina, Brazil
- Macaco River (Florida) or Charlotte River, a former name for a river that drained Lake Okeechobee
- Jorge Patino (born 1973), nicknamed Macaco, Brazilian mixed martial arts fighter

== See also ==
- Macaca or Macaque, a genus of Old World monkeys
- Macaco Branco River, a tributary of the Uruguay River in Santa Catarina, Brazil
- Macacos River (disambiguation)
