= Contendas River =

Location
- Country: Brazil

Physical characteristics
- Source
  - location: Ceará state
- Mouth
  - coordinates: 3°30′S 40°19′W

The Contendas River is a river of Ceará state in eastern Brazil. It is a tributary of the Acaraú River.

== See also ==
- List of rivers of Ceará
