= Seriema River =

Location
- Country: Brazil

Physical characteristics
- Source
  - location: Ceará state
- Mouth: Canindé River
  - coordinates: 4°1′S 39°12′W

The Seriema River is a river of Ceará state in eastern Brazil.

== See also ==
- List of rivers of Ceará
