= Sitiá River =

Location
- Country: Brazil

Physical characteristics
- Source
  - location: Ceará state
- Mouth: Banabuiú River
  - coordinates: 5°9′S 38°40′W

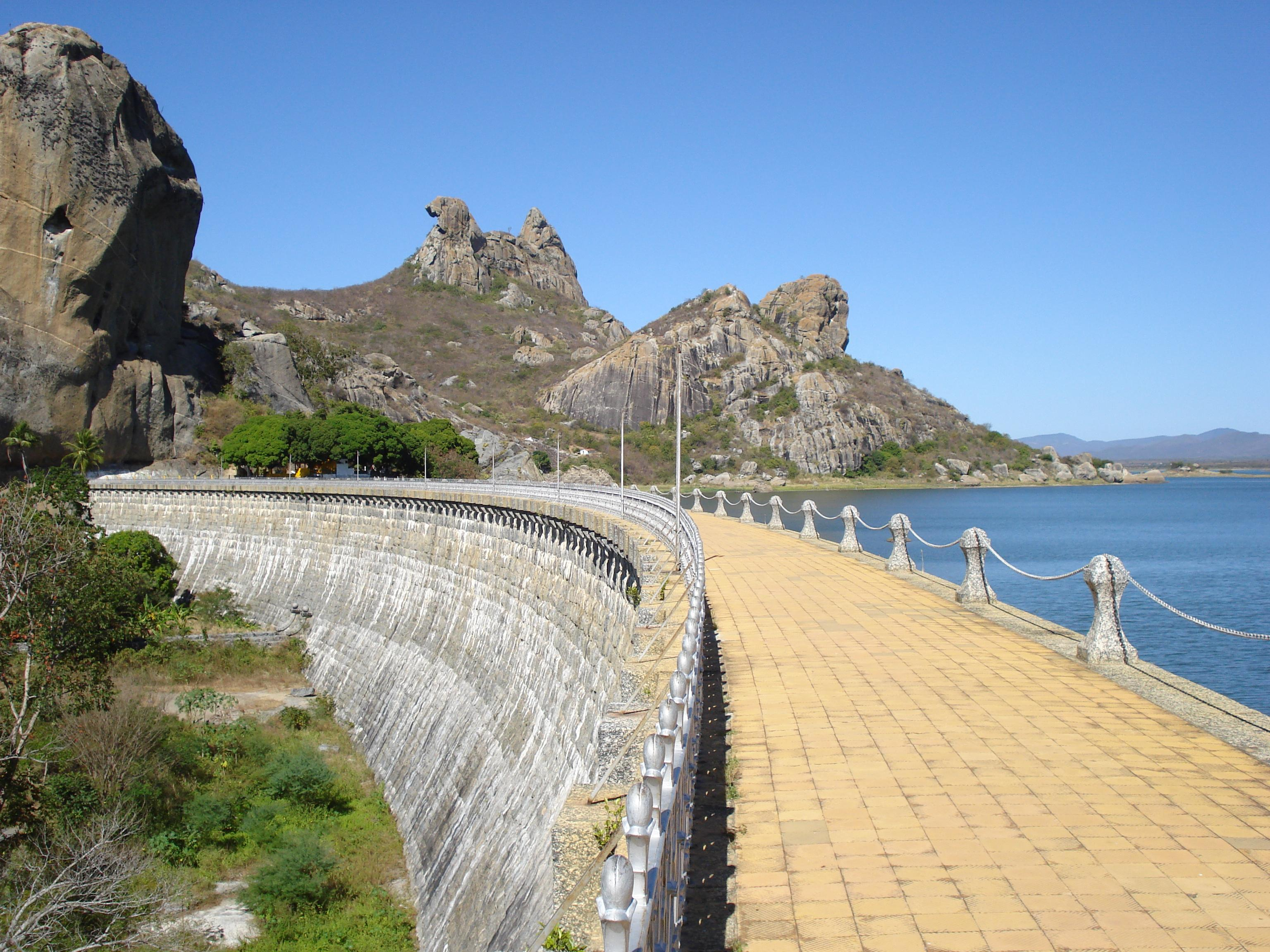

The Sitiá River is a river of Ceará state in eastern Brazil.

== See also ==
- List of rivers of Ceará
