= Jucá River =

Location
- Country: Brazil

Physical characteristics
- Source
  - location: Ceará state
- Mouth: Jaguaribe River
  - coordinates: 6°21′S 40°8′W

The Jucá River is a river of Ceará state in eastern Brazil. It flows through the municipality of Parambu.

== See also ==
- List of rivers of Ceará
