= Timonha River =

- Mouth location in Brazil
- Native name: Rio Timonha (Portuguese)

Location
- Country: Brazil

Physical characteristics
- Source
  - location: Ibiapina Mountain, Viçosa do Ceará, Ceará state
- Mouth
  - location: Atlantic Ocean
  - coordinates: 2°56′00″S 41°16′00″W
- Length: 90 km (56 mi)

The Timonha River is a river of Ceará state in eastern Brazil. Like many small rivers of northeastern Brazil, the Timonha River dries up between July and November and only flows during the rainy season. According to a survey by the United States Hydrographic Office, the Timonha River is too small to allow passage by boats.

The river is part of the Timonha-Ubatuba estuarine system, which has the largest mangrove ecosystem in Ceará.

The river delta is protected by the 313,800 hectares (775,000 acres) Delta do Parnaíba Environmental Protection Area, created in 1996.

== See also ==
- List of rivers of Ceará
