= Trairi River =

Trairi River may refer to several rivers in Brazil:

- Trairi River (Ceará)
- Trairi River (Rio Grande do Norte)
- Trairi River (Roraima), a river of Roraima
