= Tucunduba River =

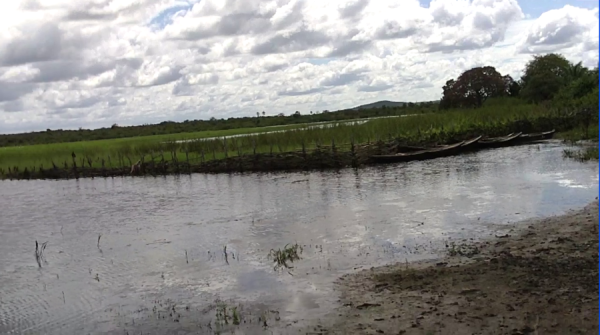

Location
- Country: Brazil

Physical characteristics
- Source
  - location: Ceará state
- Mouth: Jurema River
  - coordinates: 3°4′S 40°33′W

The Tucunduba River is a river of Ceará state in eastern Brazil.

== See also ==
- List of rivers of Ceará
