= Cocó Park =

State park in Fortaleza, Ceará, Brazil

Coordinates: 3°45′23.33″S 38°29′31.88″W

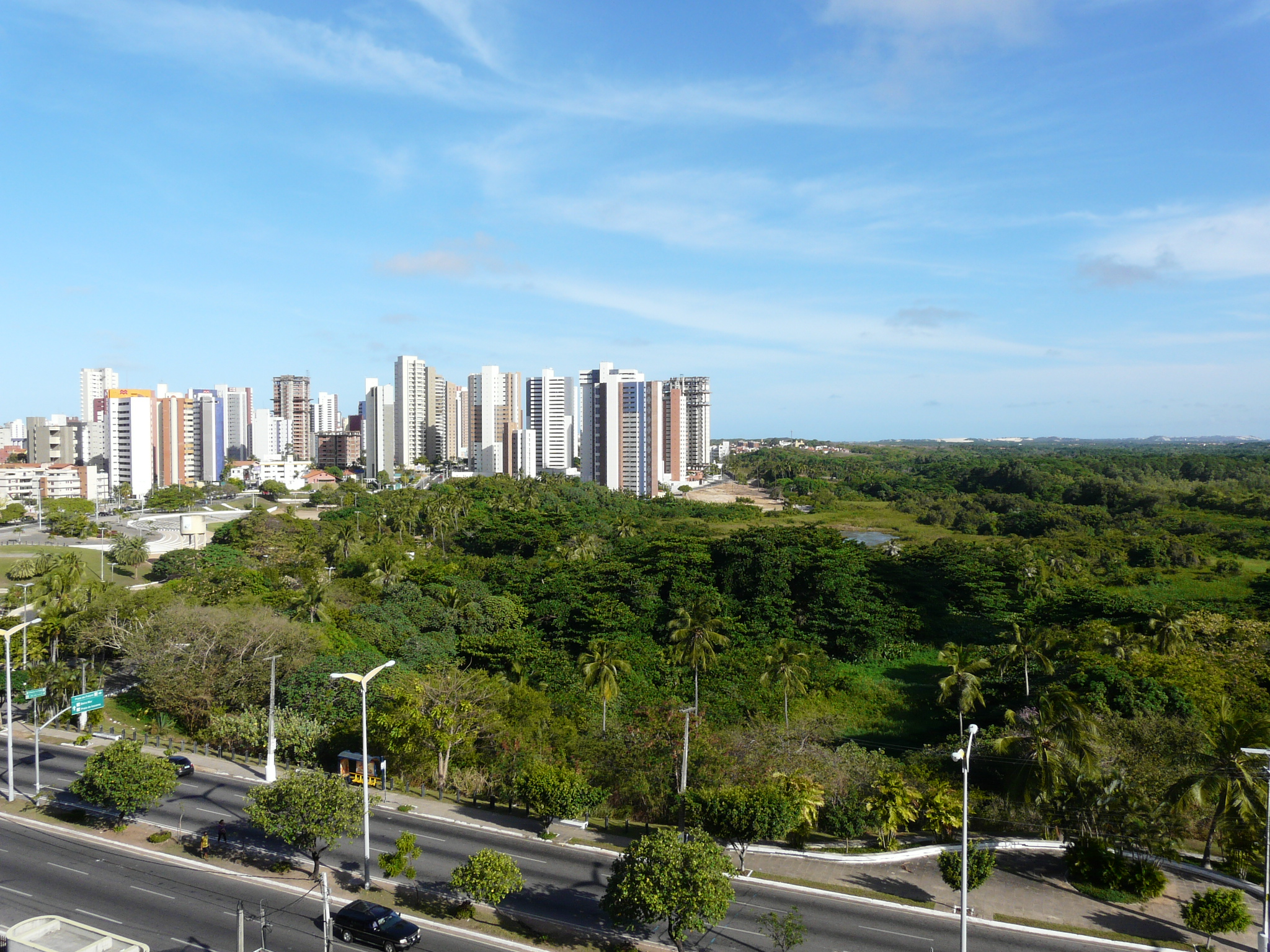
- Cocó Park
- Interactive map of Cocó Park
- Type: Urban park
- Location: Fortaleza, Brazil
- Area: 2,855 acres (1,155 ha)
- Created: 1989
- Open: All year

The Cocó Ecological Park (Portuguese: Parque Ecológico do Cocó) is an area on the Rio Cocó that serves as a conservation area and state park. It is located in the city of Fortaleza, Ceará, Brazil, considered of great importance, both for the city, and for the biodiversity that is protected within its borders.

Containing various endemic and threatened species of plant and animal life, it is considered the most important part of Fortaleza's natural and ecological heritage. Environmentally, it serves to reduce air temperatures in the city, and also forms a basin which prevents floods at times of high-rainfall. Economically, it is extremely important for the city, generating a large annual income from tourism.

The ecological reserve is currently under threat from a government proposal to build a viaduct that will cut into the reserve, resulting in large loss of local flora and fauna. The proposal has drawn widespread criticism, including from architects, university professors, environmental groups and various non-governmental organisations.

== History ==
The first moves to protect the ecosystems of the Cocó river were in March 1977 when the park was declared a public good. On 5 September 1989 a state decree created the “ecological park of Cocó” which was later expanded in 1993 to occupy an area of 1,155.2 hectares (2,855 acres), making it one of the largest urban parks in South America.

== Importance for the city ==
The park of Cocó has been cited as an important part of the solution to many of Fortaleza's most chronic social, health and environmental issues. One study cited, by the University of Delaware, shows that easy access to parks can reduce obesity and diabetes through opportunities for exercise. Another study in Chicago showed that vegetated spaces also cut crime by half.

Vegetated areas such as Cocó also provide relief from the “heat island effect” caused by the heat-trapping quality of asphalt, concrete, and building materials. Air under a tree's canopy can be as much as 5–10 °F cooler compared to full sun, with the underlying pavement up to 36 °F cooler. The park is also an area of protection for the extremely important and globally threatened Mangrove ecosystem, which includes various threatened and endemic species of plant and wildlife, of extremely high importance for urban research on these species.

As one of the biggest urban parks in South America, Cocó represents one of the main opportunities for tourists to experience the beautiful local flora and fauna, while still remaining accessible from other tourism hotspots in the city, such as Beira Mar. According to Lonely Planet: “It's Fortaleza's most popular recreational park, and organizes activities to promote environmental awareness in its visitors" From Lonely Planet's Website: "A boat tour along the Río Côco offers tourists and nature-lovers an opportunity to fully appreciate the park's wildlife and unique flora. Visitors can also walk along the park’s various nature trails to get a closer look at the park’s ecological biodiversity".

The park also represents an extremely important resource for education within the city, offering a space for many educational activities, and giving the city's children access to nature which would be otherwise impossible. The park also contains football pitches where local adults and children organise games every weekend, including tournaments. The park is also host to various cultural attractions, including an amphitheatre which offers concerts and various other cultural events.

== Threat of degradation ==
The Ecological Reserve of Coc has been gradually and constantly encroached upon by various development projects, which have drawn criticism for lack of transparency and negative environmental impacts. Such projects include the “Iguatemi” shopping centre, and a road which cuts through the park. The latest project which will encroach on the ecological reserve, which has attracted widespread criticism, proposes the development of a viaduct which will cut into the ecological reserve. Within the proposition is a re-planting program in which exotic species of trees will be introduced into the local ecosystem to compensate for the local species that will be cut down to clear the viaduct's path.

Critics, including architects, university professors, environmental groups and various non-governmental organisations, cite the lack of transparency and due process in the conception of the project, and the damage which will be caused to the unique nature of the park. The viaduct, according to these groups, judging from similar projects, will make the city more unpleasant, result in increases in crime in the area, and result in a decrease in local commercial and cultural activity in the area, as well as ecological degradation. Those who own property in the area, according to Paulo Angelim, president of the real estate sectoral chamber of the state of Cear, can expect a 20% decrease in its value. Various alternative projects have been proposed in order to resolve the city's transport problems, which involve, among other things, increasing investment in public transport and cycle-lanes, and thus reducing the need for people to rely on private cars, which currently result in chronic traffic problems and greatly increased pollution which result in a decrease of the quality of life of the city's residents.
