= Hypostomus jaguribensis =

Scientific classification
- Kingdom: Animalia
- Phylum: Chordata
- Class: Actinopterygii
- Order: Siluriformes
- Family: Loricariidae
- Genus: Hypostomus
- Species: H. jaguribensis

Binomial name
- Hypostomus jaguribensis (Fowler, 1915)

Synonyms
- Plecostomus jaguribensis

Species of catfish

Hypostomus jaguribensis is a species of catfish in the family Loricariidae. It is native to South America, where it occurs in the Jaguaribe River basin, for which it is named. The species reaches 12 cm (4.7 inches) in total length and is believed to be a facultative air-breather.

Hypostomus jaguribensis sometimes appears in the aquarium trade, where it is typically known as the Jaguribe pleco.
