= Rikbaktsa language =

Macro-Ge language spoken in Brazil

Rikbaktsá
- Canoeiro
- erigpaksá
- Native to: Brazil
- Region: Mato Grosso
- Ethnicity: 1,140 Rikbaktsa people (2006)
- Native speakers: 40 (2010)
- Language family: Macro-Gê: Rikbaktsá

Language codes
- ISO 639-3: rkb
- Glottolog: rikb1245
- ELP: Rikbaktsá
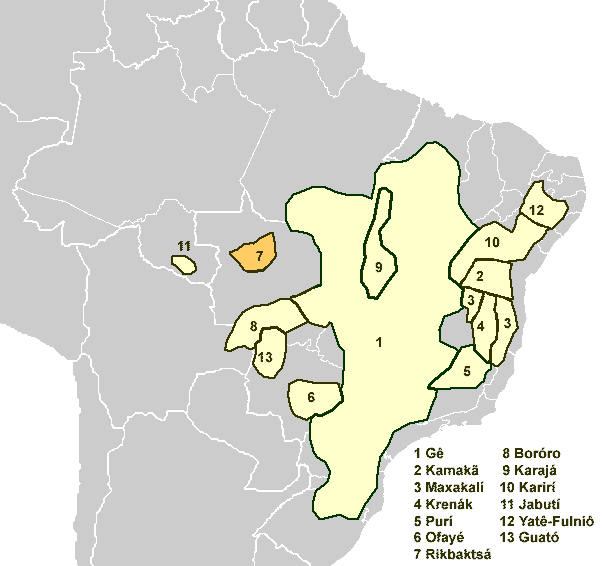

- Rikbaktsa is classified as Severely Endangered by the UNESCO Atlas of the World's Languages in Danger.

The Rikbaktsa language, also spelled Aripaktsa, Erikbatsa or Erikpatsa and known ambiguously as Canoeiro, is a language spoken by 40 of the Rikbaktsa people of Mato Grosso, Brazil, that forms its own branch of the Macro-Gê languages, or is a language isolate.

Most Rikbaktsa can speak both Rikbaktsa and Portuguese. Younger individuals tend to speak Portuguese more frequently and fluently than their elders, but older individuals generally struggle with Portuguese and use it only with non-indigenous Brazilians.

Jolkesky (2016) also notes that there are lexical similarities with the Cariban languages.

== Locations ==
The 22nd edition of Ethnologue reports that it is spoken around confluence of the Sangue River and Juruena River in:

- Japuira on the east bank of the Juruena River, between the Arinos River and Sangue River
- Posto Escondido on the west bank of the Juruena River (9 villages, 14 settlements)

== Phonology ==
Vowels
	Front	Central	Back
Close	i	ɨ	u
Close-mid	e		o
Mid		ə	
Open		a	

Nasal vowels
	Front	Central	Back
Close	ĩ	ɨ̃	ũ
Close-mid	ẽ		õ
Mid		ə̃	
Open		ã	

- /i, u/ can be heard as [ɪ, ʊ] when in syllable-final position.
- /e, o/ can be heard as [ɛ, ɔ] when in unstressed syllables.
- /a/ is heard as [ʌ] in final unstressed syllables, as [æ] when following /tʃ/ heard as [tʃʲ], and as [ɑ] when occurring after the sequence /ku/.

Consonants
		Labial	Alveolar	Palato- alveolar	Retroflex	Palatal	Velar	Glottal
Stop	voiceless	p	t				k	(ʔ)
Stop	voiced	b	d					
Affricate				t͡ʃ				
Fricative				ʃ				h
Nasal		m	n					
Approximant		w				j		
Flap			ɾ		ɽ			

- A glottal stop [ʔ] can also be heard in initial and final position when before and after vowels.
- /d/ can be palatalized as [dʲ] when before /i/.
- /t͡ʃ/ can be palatalized as [t͡ʃʲ] when in front of /a/.
- /p, k/ can be heard as aspirated [pʰ, kʰ] when before an accented syllable.
- /k/ can be heard as voiced [ɡ] when before voiced consonants.
- /w/ can be heard as [β] when in stressed syllable before front vowels.
- Sounds /ɾ, w, h/ can be heard as nasal [ɾ̃, w̃, h̃] when in nasal vowel positions.

== Grammar ==
As in other languages of the area, word endings indicate the gender of the speaker. Rikbaktsa is a subject-object-verb language.
