= Conceição River (Ceará) =

- Location within Brazil

Location
- Country: Brazil

Physical characteristics
- Source
  - location: Ceará state
- Mouth: Jaguaribe River
  - coordinates: 6°34′S 39°54′W

The Conceição River is a river of Ceará state in eastern Brazil.

== See also ==
- List of rivers of Ceará
