= Figueiredo River =

Location
- Country: Brazil

Physical characteristics
- Source
  - location: Ceará state
- Mouth: Jaguaribe River
  - coordinates: 5°23′S 38°18′W

The Figueiredo River is a river of Ceará state in eastern Brazil. It is a tributary of the Jaguaribe River.

== See also ==
- List of rivers of Ceará
