= Macambira River =

Macambira River may refer to two rivers in Brazil:

- Macambira River (Ceará)
- Macambira River (Goiás)

== See also ==
- Macambira
