= Caxitoré River =

River in Ceará, Brazil

Location
- Country: Brazil

Physical characteristics
- Source
  - location: Ceará state
- Mouth: Curu River
  - coordinates: 3°47′S 39°27′W

The Caxitoré River is a river of Ceará state in eastern Brazil.

== See also ==
- List of rivers of Ceará
