= Umburanas =

Umburanas may refer to:

- Umburanas, Bahia
- Umburanas, Ceará
