= Truçu River =

Coordinates: 6°18′S 39°25′W

Location
- Country: Brazil

Physical characteristics
- Source
  - location: Ceará state

The Truçu River is a river of Ceará state in eastern Brazil.

== See also ==
- List of rivers of Ceará
