= Jacurutu River =

Coordinates: 3°35′S 40°24′W

Location
- Country: Brazil

Physical characteristics
- Source
  - location: Ceará state

The Jacurutu River is a river of Ceará state in eastern Brazil.

== See also ==
- List of rivers of Ceará
