= Pacoti River =

Coordinates: 3°49′25″S 38°24′06″W

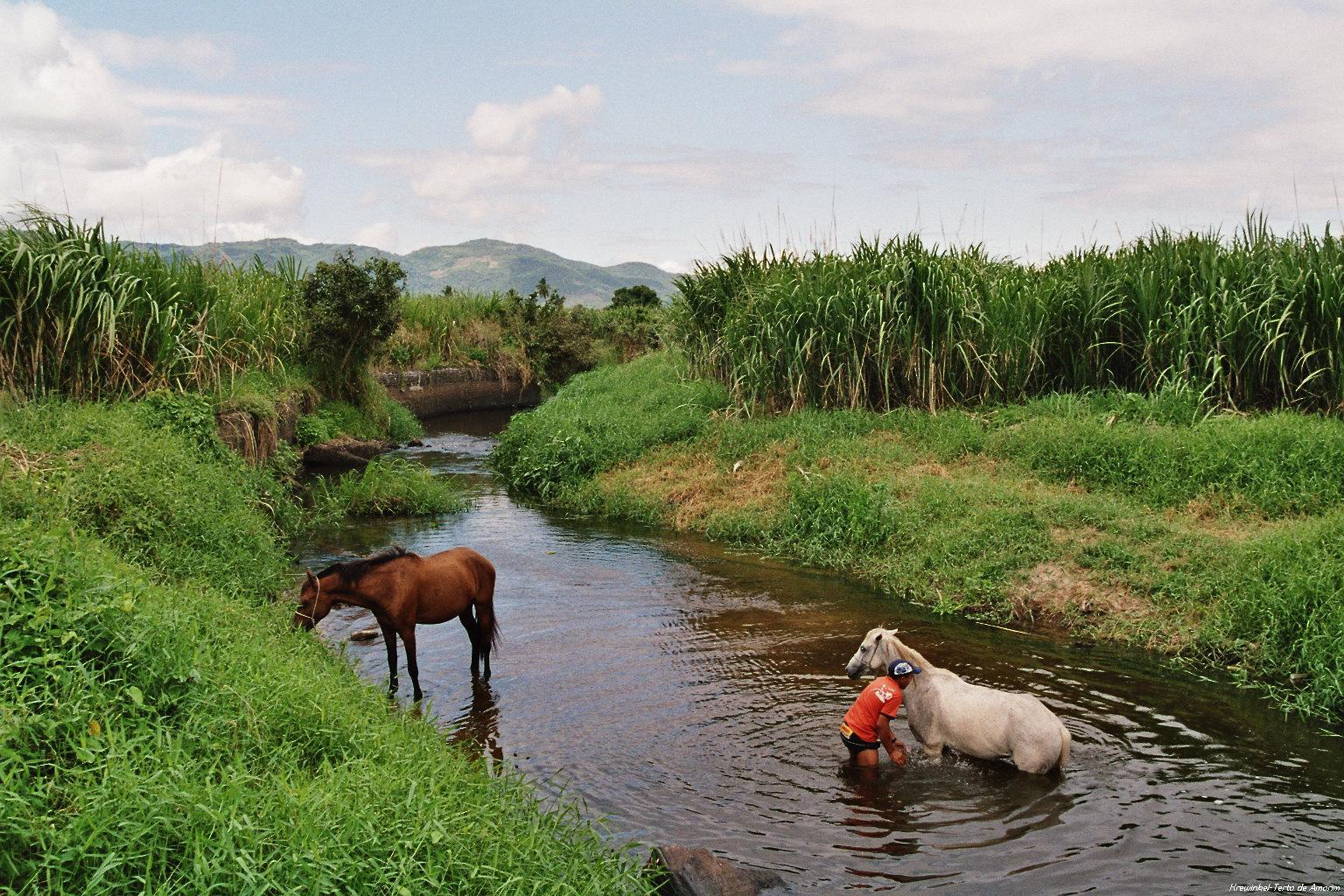

Location
- Country: Brazil

Physical characteristics
- Source
  - location: Ceará state
- Length: 150 km (93 mi)

The Pacoti River is a river of Ceará state in eastern Brazil.

== See also ==
- List of rivers of Ceará
