= Acaraú =

Municipality in Ceará, Brazil

- Municipality
- The Municipality of Acaraú
- Flag Coat of arms
- Nickname: Acarauense

- Location in Brazil
- Coordinates: 02°53′09″S 40°07′12″W
- Country: Brazil
- Region: Northeast
- State: Ceará
- Founded: July 31, 1849

Government
  - Mayor: Ana Flávia Ribeiro (PSB)

Area
  - Total: 842.884 km^{2} (325.439 sq mi)
- Elevation: 7 m (23 ft)

Population (2020)
  - Total: 63,104
  - Density: 68.268/km^{2} (176.81/sq mi)
- Time zone: UTC−3 (BRT)

Acaraú (also Acarahú) is a municipality in the Ceará state of Brazil. The city lies on the Acaraú River near the northern Atlantic coast. In 2020 the population was estimated at 63,104. The municipality is a major producer of Brazilian lobster and its economy depends heavily on fishing, agriculture and cattle breeding.

== Etymology ==
The origin of the toponym "Acaraú" is indigenous, with at least two hypotheses regarding its meaning:

It may be the result of the fusion of acará (heron) and hu (water), thus meaning "river of herons" (according to Paulinho Nogueira); however, Silveira Bueno translates acará as cará or cascudo (a type of fish) and u or y as water or river, therefore "river of the cará." This interpretation also seems to align with Navarro.

== Climate ==
Climate data for Acaraú (1981–2010)
| Month | Jan | Feb | Mar | Apr | May | Jun | Jul | Aug | Sep | Oct | Nov | Dec | Year |
|---|---|---|---|---|---|---|---|---|---|---|---|---|---|
| Mean daily maximum °C (°F) | 31.7 (89.1) | 31.1 (88.0) | 30.7 (87.3) | 30.6 (87.1) | 31.3 (88.3) | 31.6 (88.9) | 32.2 (90.0) | 32.7 (90.9) | 32.9 (91.2) | 32.8 (91.0) | 32.8 (91.0) | 32.8 (91.0) | 31.9 (89.4) |
| Mean daily minimum °C (°F) | 23.4 (74.1) | 23.4 (74.1) | 23.3 (73.9) | 23.3 (73.9) | 23.0 (73.4) | 22.3 (72.1) | 21.9 (71.4) | 22.4 (72.3) | 23.1 (73.6) | 23.3 (73.9) | 23.3 (73.9) | 23.6 (74.5) | 23.0 (73.4) |
| Average precipitation mm (inches) | 113.5 (4.47) | 173.1 (6.81) | 321.1 (12.64) | 308.9 (12.16) | 142.3 (5.60) | 64.6 (2.54) | 25.1 (0.99) | 5.3 (0.21) | 2.3 (0.09) | 2.1 (0.08) | 2.5 (0.10) | 14.5 (0.57) | 1,175.3 (46.27) |
| Average precipitation days (≥ 1.0 mm) | 9 | 13 | 19 | 19 | 12 | 7 | 4 | 1 | 1 | 1 | 1 | 2 | 89 |
| Mean monthly sunshine hours | 202.7 | 164.5 | 151.0 | 153.3 | 203.7 | 237.0 | 262.1 | 291.4 | 289.5 | 304.9 | 288.7 | 266.2 | 2,815 |
Source: Instituto Nacional de Meteorologia
