= Jaibaras River =

Location
- Country: Brazil

Physical characteristics
- Source
  - location: Ceará state

The Jaibaras River is a river of Ceará state in eastern Brazil.

== Water quality testing in the Jaibaras River ==
Human activity has caused contamination of the Jaibaras River. From June 2002 to April 2005, 24 water samples were collected for quality testing. The samples were collected at two locations of the river. At the first collection point, there was a variance of sample by 80%, and at the second collection point, there was a variance of sample by 81%.

== See also ==
- List of rivers of Ceará
