= Banabuiú River =

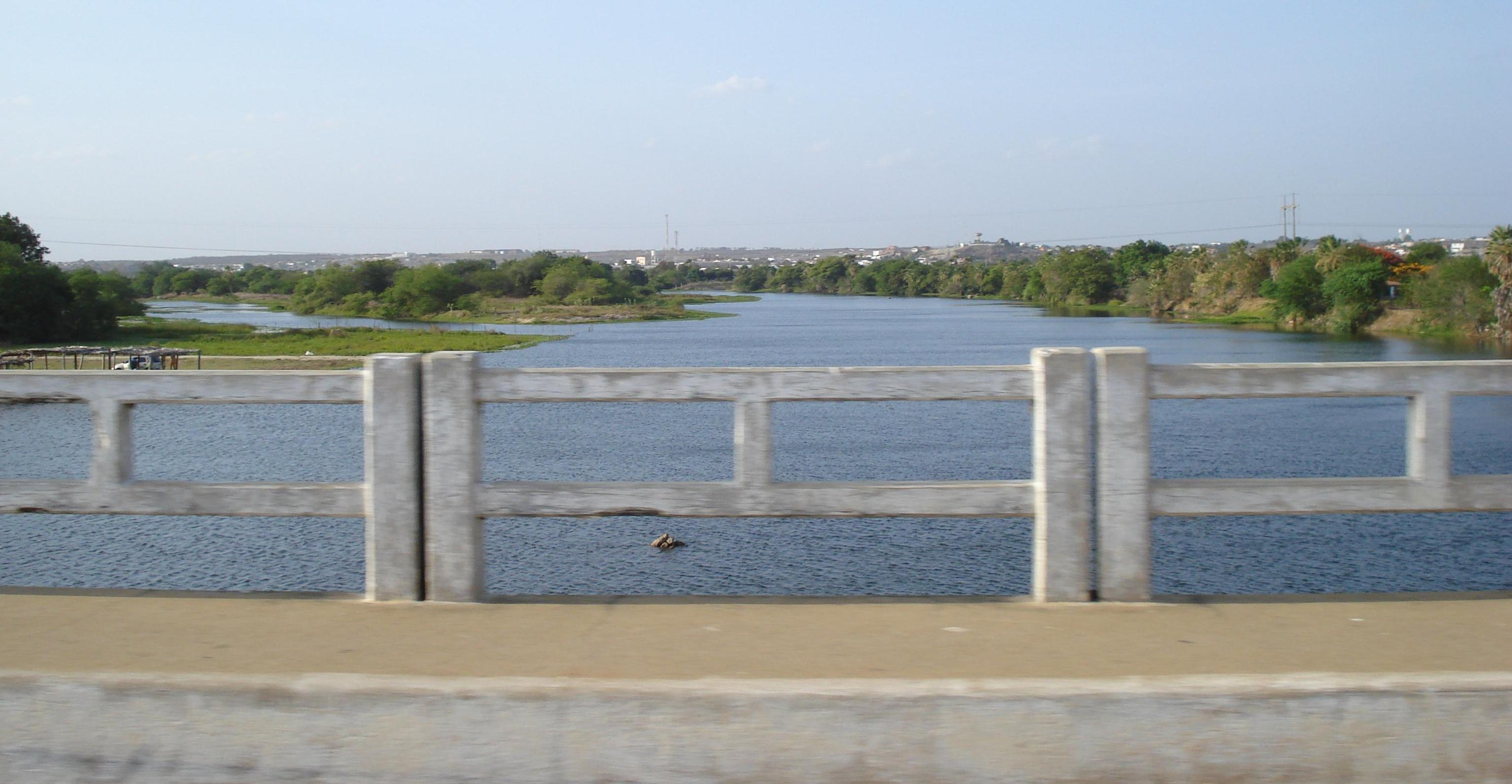

Location
- Country: Brazil

Physical characteristics
- Source
  - location: Ceará state
- Mouth: Jaguaribe River
  - coordinates: 5°8′S 38°7′W

The Banabuiú River is a river of Ceará state in eastern Brazil.

== See also ==
- List of rivers of Ceará
