= Cariús River =

Coordinates: 6°32′53″S 39°29′34″W

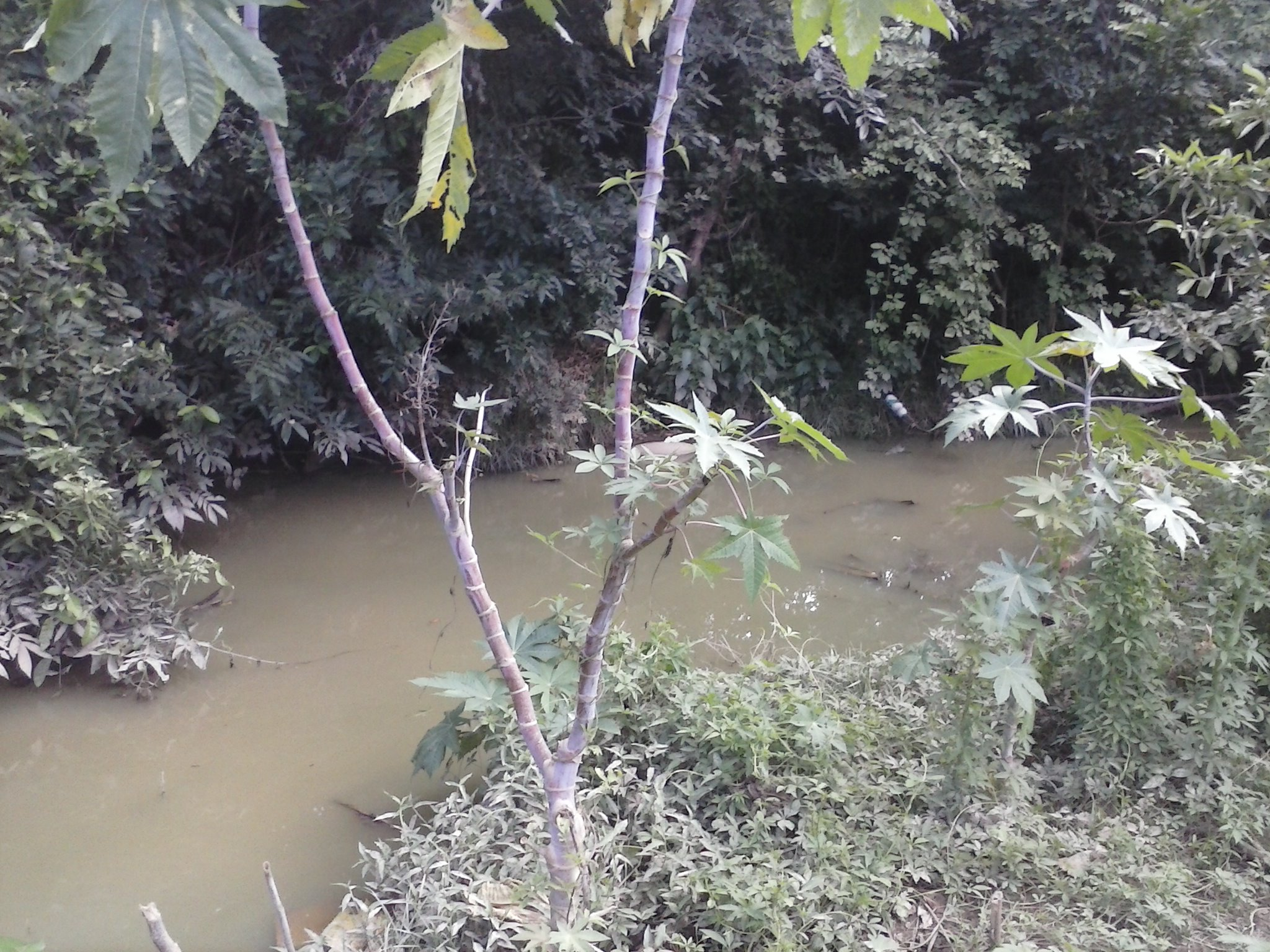

- Location within Brazil

Location
- Country: Brazil

Physical characteristics
- Source
  - location: Ceará state

The Cariús River is a river of Ceará state in eastern Brazil.

== See also ==
- List of rivers of Ceará
