= Boa Viagem River =

Coordinates: 5°06′S 39°42′W

Location
- Country: Brazil

Physical characteristics
- Source
  - location: Ceará state

The Boa Viagem River is a river of Ceará state in eastern Brazil.

== See also ==
- List of rivers of Ceará
