= Sangue River =

- Location within Brazil

Location
- Country: Brazil
- State: Ceará

Physical characteristics
- Mouth: Jaguaribe River
  - coordinates: 5°36′S 38°35′W

The Sangue River is a river of Ceará state in eastern Brazil. It is a tributary of the Jaguaribe River.

== See also ==
- List of rivers of Ceará
