= Rikbaktsa =

Indigenous group in Brazil

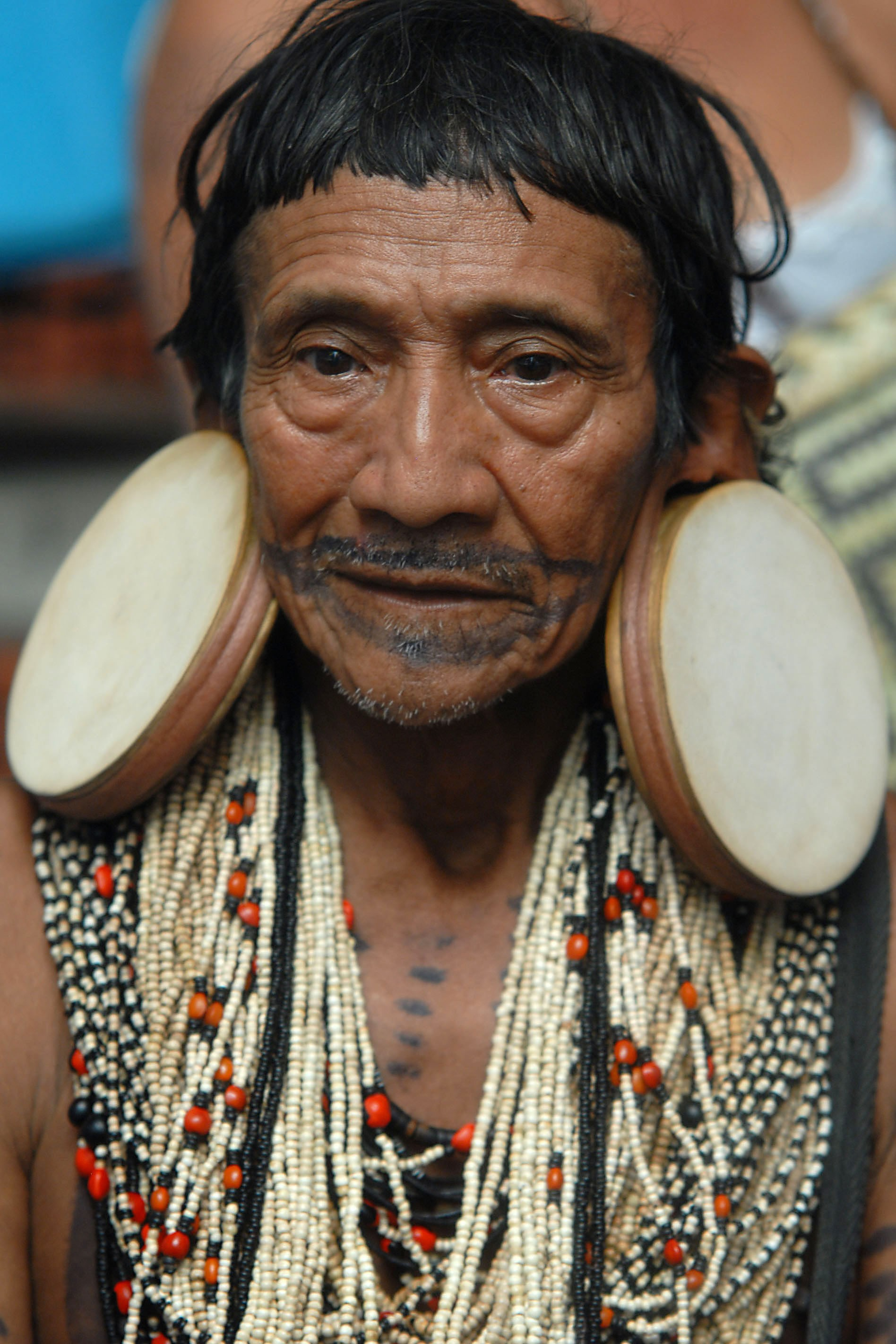
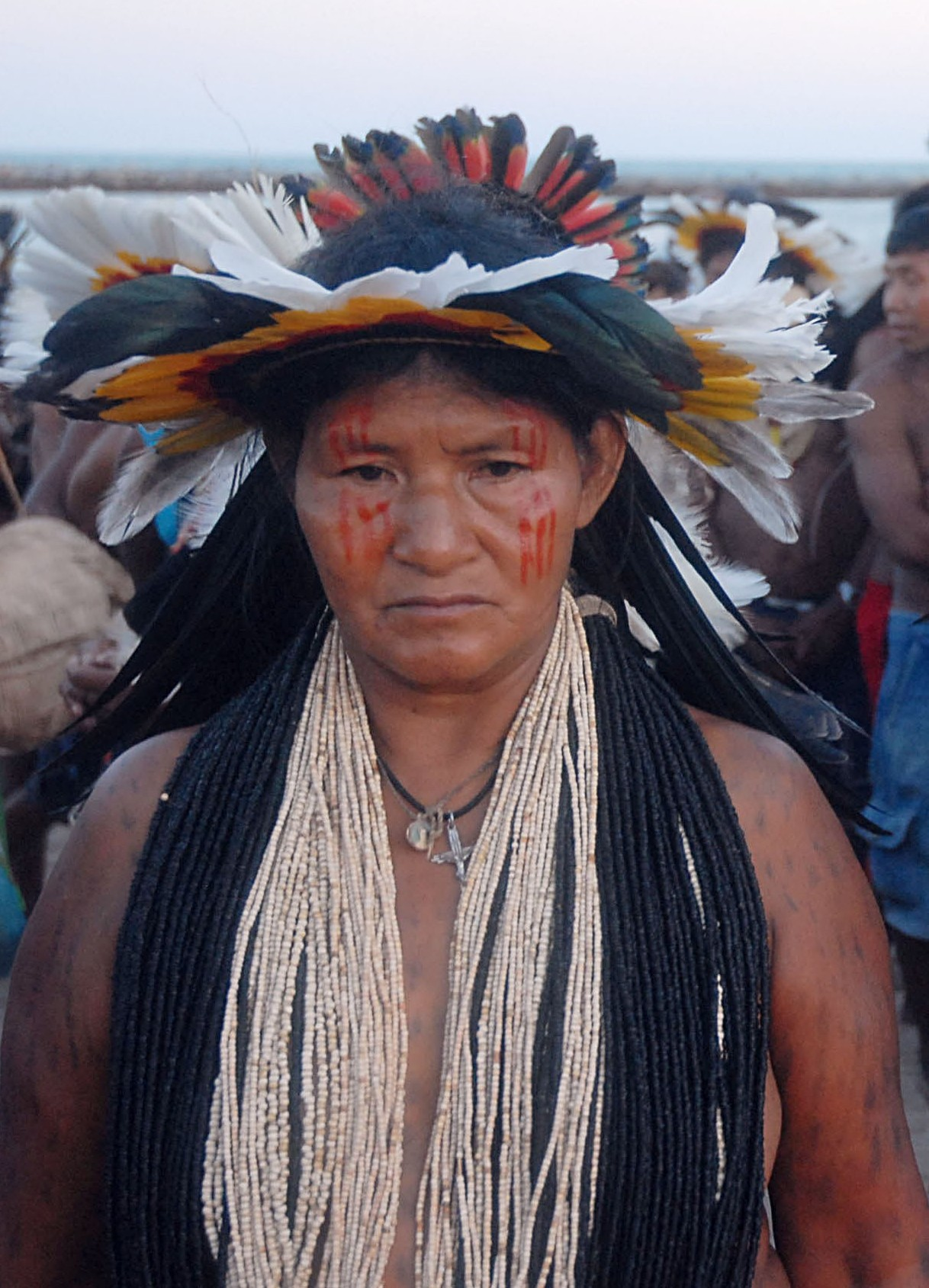
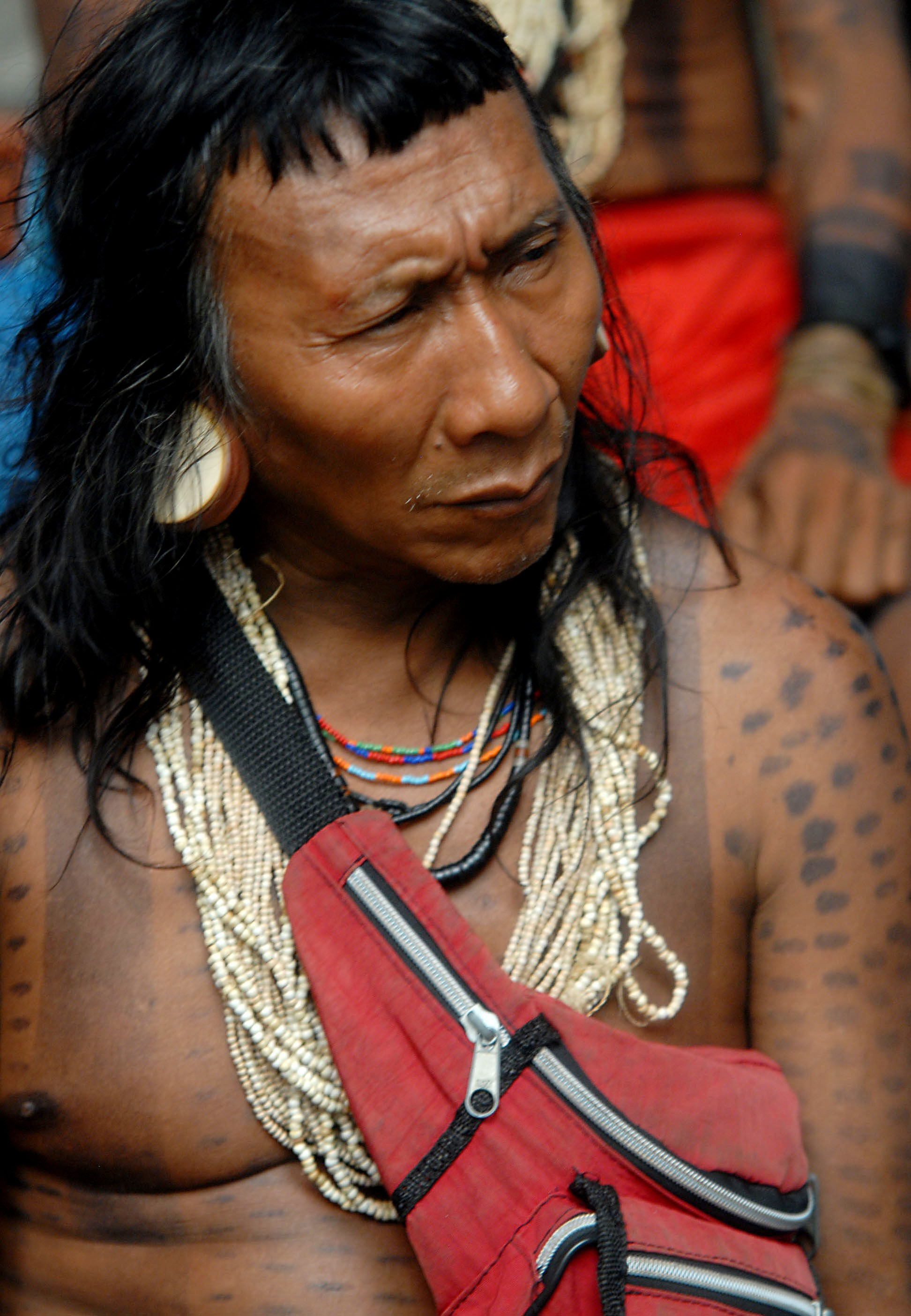
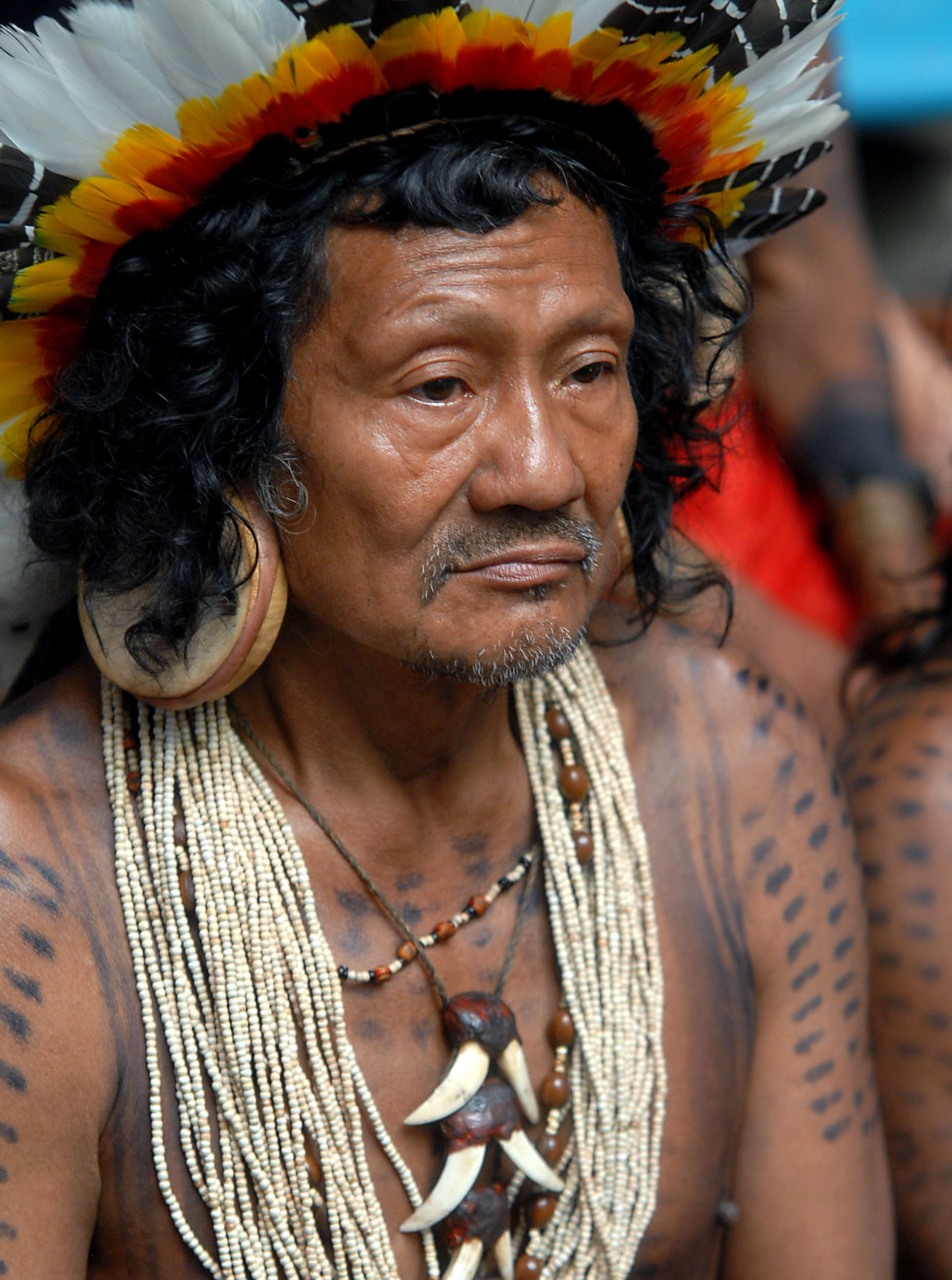

Total population
- 1600 (2020)

Regions with significant populations
- Brazil

Languages
- Rikbaktsa, Portuguese

Religion
- Animism

The Rikbaktsa are an Indigenous group from the Mato Grosso region of Brazil.

== Name ==
Rikbaktsa (Rikbaktsa rik, person + bak, human being + tsa [plural suffix]), the group's self-denomination, can be translated as "the human beings". Variant spellings include Ricbacta, Erikbaktsa, Erigpaktsa, Erigpagtsá, Erigpactsa, Erikbaktsá, Arikpaktsá, and Aripaktsá. Locally, they are also called Canoeiros (Canoe People), alluding to their aptitude in canoe use, or—more rarely—Orelhas de Pau (Wooden Ears), alluding to their practice of enlarging their earlobes with wooden plugs.

== Location ==
The Rikbaktsa's territory is within the Brazilian state of Mato Grosso (pictured).

The Rikbaktsa live in the Amazon rain forest of northwest Mato Grosso. Their traditional territory spanned 50,000 km² of Juruena River basin, stretching from the Papagaio River in the south to the Augusto Falls on the upper Tapajós River in the north. Their territory was bounded on the west by the Aripuanã River and on the east by the Arinos River, near the Peixes River.

Today, they have rights to three Indigenous Lands: Erikbaktsa (79,935 hectares, demarcated in 1968), Japuíra (152,509 hectares, demarcated in 1986), and Escondido (168,938 hectares, demarcated in 1998).

== History ==
There are no pre-20th century historical references to the Rikbaktsa, and there have been no archeological studies to date their occupation of their traditional lands. However, oral histories, geographic references in their myths, and their detailed knowledge of nearby flora and fauna suggest that they have lived on the land for some time.

Though scientific, commercial, and strategic expeditions have visited the region surrounding the Rikbaktsa since the 17th century, they stayed on the waterways and did not venture into the forests in which the Rikbaktsa lived. It was not until rubber gatherers came to the region in the late 1940s that the first historical references to Rikbaktsa people appeared. The Rikbaktsa, who were known for their hostile relations with nearly every neighboring indigenous group, initially resisted the presence of rubber gatherers. The Rikbaktsa were finally "pacified" by rubber planter–financed Jesuit missionaries between 1957 and 1962, when they stopped resisting the planters. After 1962, the rubber-extraction, timber, mining, and agricultural industries encroached on the Rikbaktsa's traditional territory.

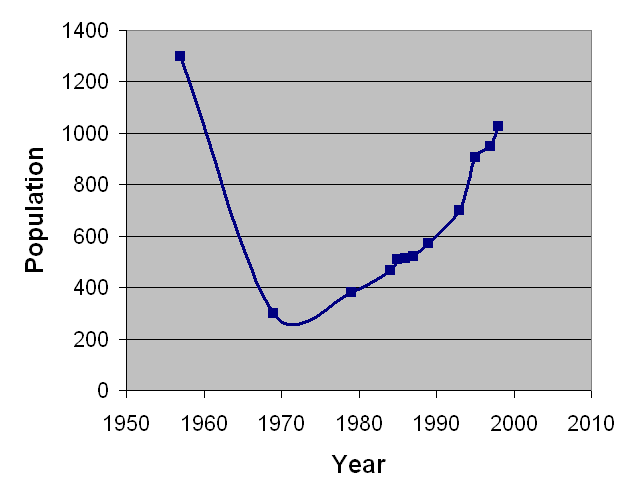
Rikbaktsa historical population trend

During the pacification process and the subsequent years, epidemics of influenza, chickenpox, and smallpox reduced the Rikbaktsa population by three quarters. As a result, they lost the majority of their land, and most Rikbaktsa children were taken to be raised alongside other indigenous children at a Jesuit boarding school nearly 200 km away from their homes. The tribe's remaining adults were progressively moved from their villages to larger villages administered by Jesuit missionaries. After the 1968 demarcation of the Erikbaktsa Indigenous Land on one tenth of the tribe's original territory, children began to return to their home villages.

During the 1970s, missionaries increasingly recognized indigenous peoples' right to their own culture and to self-determination. This period also saw the start of the Rikbaktsa's population recovery, as the Anchieta Mission exerted its protective influence. While the mission continued to pressure the Rikbaktsa toward acculturation, they nonetheless provided the minimum physical necessities for the Rikbaktsa's recovery. Since the late 1970s, the Rikbaktsa have attempted to recover their traditional territory, and in 1985 they regained control of the Japuíra. During this time, population growth stalled somewhat, which may be partially attributed to the struggle for Japuíra, during which food production and health services lagged. After 1987, increased access to resources and health services assistance from the Anchieta Mission and the Fundação Nacional do Índio, population recovery continued at a rapid pace. As of 2001, there were 909 Rikbaktsa people.

In recent years, the decentralized structure of Rikbaktsa society has proved an obstacle to joint undertakings to preserve Rikbaktsa land and culture. To counteract this, the Ribaktsa created the Associação Indígena Rikbaktsa (Rikbaktsa Indigenous Association), or Asirik, in 1995. The organization is aimed to interact with external agencies and provide a more unified voice for Ribaktsa people. It is run by representatives from all Ribaktsa internal territorial sub-groups. The Ribaktsa have invested heavily in education; there are 20 village schools run by indigenous teachers, many of whom have participated in recent teacher training promoted by the Mato Grosso state government. As of 1998, the Rikbaktsa were trying to find a health assistance partner. Formerly, the Anchieta Mission trained indigenous nurses and practical dentists.

== Language ==
The native language of the Rikbaktsa, called either Rikbaktsa or Erikbaktsa, is a Macro-Gê language. As in other indigenous languages, word endings indicate the gender of the speaker.

Most Rikbaktsa can speak both Rikbaktsa and Portuguese. Younger individuals tend to speak Portuguese more frequently and fluently than their elders, but older individuals generally struggle with Portuguese and use it only with non-indigenous Brazilians.

== Political organization ==
Reciprocity is the most important factor in Rikbaktsa political relations. Women are exchanged among clans for marriage, and goods and labour are offered to other clans. Breaks in reciprocity among subgroups often cause divisions between Rikbaktsa subgroups, which is influential in determining the distance of villages from their neighbors. While there were serious pre-contact rivalries between Rikbaktsa of various rivers, their present-day struggle for survival has encouraged group cohesion as well as, on occasion, alliances with other indigenous societies.

Traditionally, the Rikbaktsa have had no chiefs, and each domestic group theoretically is its own political unit. (Centralized leadership structures imposed on the Rikbaktsa by missionaries were unsuccessful.) Without centralized leadership, social control is maintained primarily through gossip, ostracism, and social avoidance. Despite the lack of official leaders, there are influential community members that shape others' behavior beyond the confines of their houses or villages. Such leaders have often been those with great personal capacities as well as those with many relatives. In recent years, young men who are familiar with Western society and have responded well to contact have also been influential.

== Beliefs and culture ==
Oral story-telling and myth are important to the Rikbaktsa. The Rikbaktsa believe in reincarnation, and that future incarnations are dependent on the life one led. The virtuous may be reincarnated as human beings or night monkeys (which are never hunted by the Rikbaktsa), while the villainous are reincarnated as dangerous animals like jaguars or poisonous snakes. However, the Rikbaktsa believe that all organisms were once human and that they were transformed into animals for good.

Sickness is seen as resulting from the breaking of taboos, from spells, or from poisoning by enemies. Rikbaktsa traditional medicine uses plant matter and ritual purification.

For the Rikbaktsa, music, rituals, and traditional dress have served as a unifying element in the face of contact with the outside world. Hunting, fishing, gathering, and agriculture are ritualized with ceremonies throughout the year. The two largest ceremonies are the January green maize ceremony and the May forest-clearing ceremony. Ceremonies often involve body paint, feather ornaments, flute-playing of traditional songs, and the performance of mythical stories and recent fights.

== Rites of passage ==
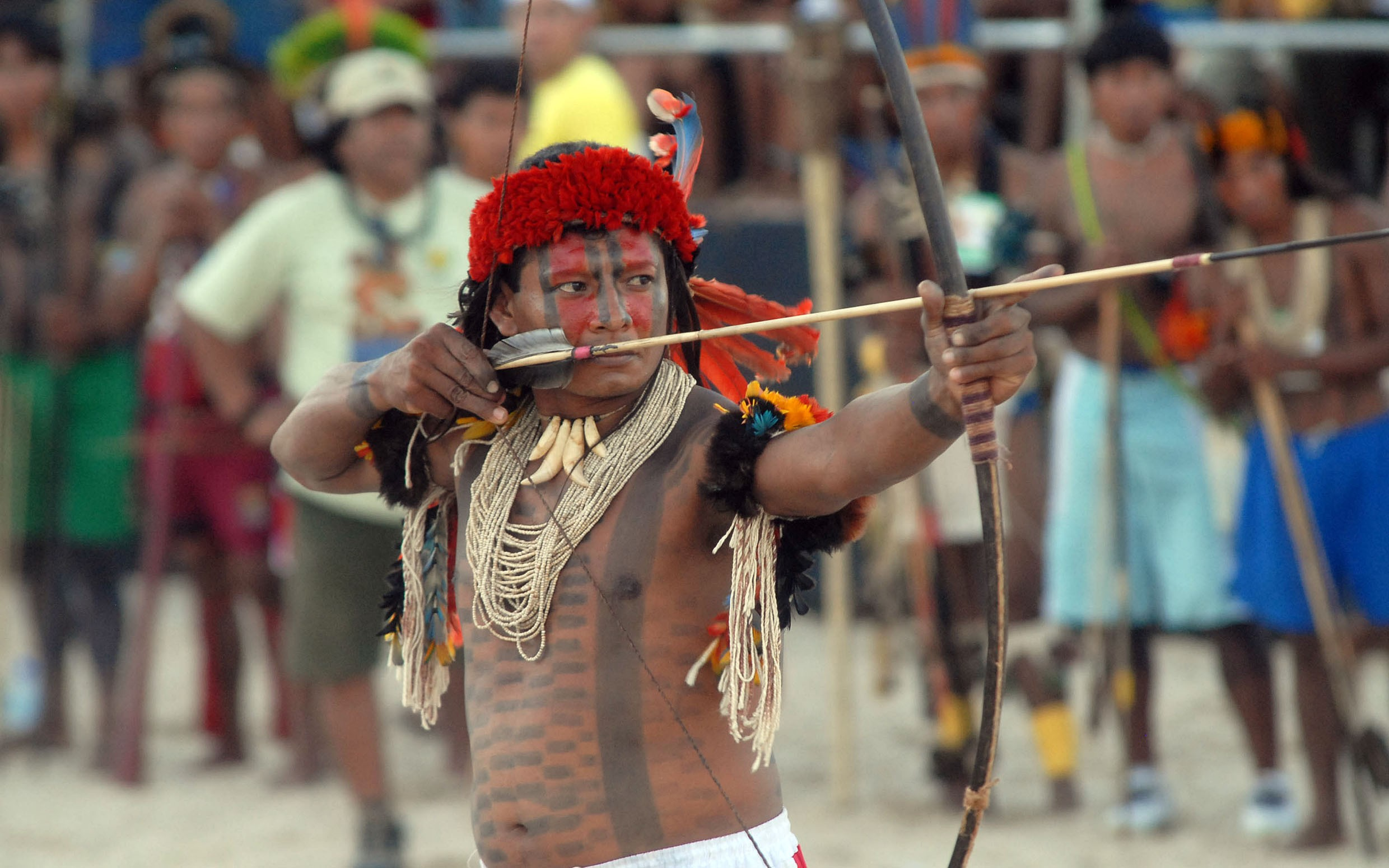
A young Rikbaktsa man competes at Brazil's Indigenous Games

=== Men ===
Boys are given their "child" name at birth. Starting when he is between three and five years old, he starts hunting with his father and being taught about hunting, animals, and local geography. By age eight or ten, boys can make and use their own bow and arrows. Once a boy has mastered the bow and arrow, at age eleven or twelve, his nose is pierced during the ceremony of the maize and he receives his second name. At this point, the boy may spend time in the men's house, where he learns about ceremonies, myths, traditional medicine, and flute-playing, and assumes more household and village responsibilities.

Traditionally, when the boy is capable of hunting large animals and is knowledgeable about traditional ceremonies, around age 14 or 15, he would have his ears pierced in a ritual celebration. This now-obsolete rite marked the boys' transition into manhood and eligibility for marriage. Traditionally, the young man would then participate in a warring expedition against neighboring tribes. However, this tradition has also been abandoned; today, young men instead actively participate in the tribe's recovery and maintenance of their territory.

Shortly after these rituals, or after marriage, the young man receives his third, "adult" name. Today, ear-piercing is not necessary for a young man to receive his adult name, so long as he is old enough and knowledgeable enough. Some men also change their names again later in life as they achieve a higher social status.

=== Women ===
Girls traditionally had their noses pierced around age 12, though today some Rikbaktsa practice this and others do not. At this age, girls take "forest medicine" to reduce the pain that will be felt when they give birth later. Traditionally, fathers decided when their daughters would have their faces tattooed in a ceremony, after which they are considered women and eligible for marriage, though, this ritual of passage is no longer practiced. Following nose piercing and perhaps tattooing and her wedding, a woman is entitled to receive a new name to replace her child name.

== Subsistence and economic activities ==
Though agriculture is central to the timing of tribal life, the Rikbaksta consider themselves hunter-gatherers rather than farmers. Traditional knowledge of natural resources is transmitted between generations and among group members freely; this, combined with the abundance of resources in the rain forest, allows for egalitarianism within the tribe. Each residence, which consists of a man, his wife, his single sons, his daughters (both single and married), his sons-in-law, and his grandchildren, generally produces and consumes its own food. Cooperation among a larger group occurs only during agricultural rituals and a few other occasions, but is complemented by a system of reciprocal kinship relationships.

The Rikbaktsa use slash-and-burn agriculture, where ½–2 hectare planting fields are cleared by fire every 2 or 3 years. Old fields are generally left fallow and eventually retaken by the forest. The Rikbaktsa regularly plant rice, cassava, maize, yams, beans, cotton, urucu, bananas, peanuts, sugarcane, and pumpkin. On occasion limes, oranges, tangerines, pineapple, mangoes, and other fruits are also planted.
