= Aracatimirim River =

Coordinates: 2°57′09″S 39°47′35″W

Location
- Country: Brazil

Physical characteristics
- Source
  - location: Ceará state

The Aracatimirim River is a river of Ceará state in eastern Brazil.

== See also ==
- List of rivers of Ceará

== Bibliography ==
- Brazilian Ministry of Transport
