= Pirangi River =

Location
- Country: Brazil

Physical characteristics
- Source
  - location: Ceará state
- Mouth: Atlantic Ocean
  - coordinates: 4°24′S 37°49′W

The Pirangi River is a river of Ceará state in eastern Brazil.

== See also ==
- List of rivers of Ceará
