= Cangati River =

Coordinates: 4°39′S 38°56′W

Location
- Country: Brazil

Physical characteristics
- Source
  - location: Ceará state

The Cangati River is a river of Ceará state in eastern Brazil.

== See also ==
- List of rivers of Ceará
