= São Gonçalo River =

- Location within Brazil
- Native name: Rio São Gonçalo (Portuguese)

Location
- Country: Brazil

Physical characteristics
- Source
  - location: Ceará state
- Mouth
  - coordinates: 3.578480°S 38.953644°W

The São Gonçalo River (Portuguese: São Gonçalo) is a river of Ceará state in eastern Brazil. It is a tributary of the Anil River, which it joins in São Gonçalo do Amarante, Ceará, shortly before that river flows into the Atlantic Ocean.

== See also ==
- List of rivers of Ceará
