= Itacolomi River =

Coordinates: 3°16′30″S 40°48′46″W

Location
- Country: Brazil

Physical characteristics
- Source
  - location: Ceará state

The Itacolomi River is a river in the state of Ceará in eastern Brazil.

== See also ==
- List of rivers of Ceará
