= Choró River =

Location
- Country: Brazil

Physical characteristics
- Source
  - location: Ceará state
- Mouth: Atlantic Ocean
  - coordinates: 4°6′S 38°9′W

The Choró River is a river of Ceará state in eastern Brazil.

== History ==
An unclassified extinct language called Teremembe, Tremembé, or Taramembé was originally spoken by a tribe on the coast between the mouth of the Monim River and the mouth of the Choró River. (See list of unclassified languages of South America.)

== See also ==
- List of rivers of Ceará
