= Jurema River =

Location
- Country: Brazil

Physical characteristics
- Source
  - location: Ceará state
- Mouth: Atlantic Ocean
  - coordinates: 3°6′S 40°35′W

The Jurema River is a river in Ceará, Brazil.

== See also ==
- List of rivers of Ceará
