= Conceição, Paraíba =

Conceição
- Municipality
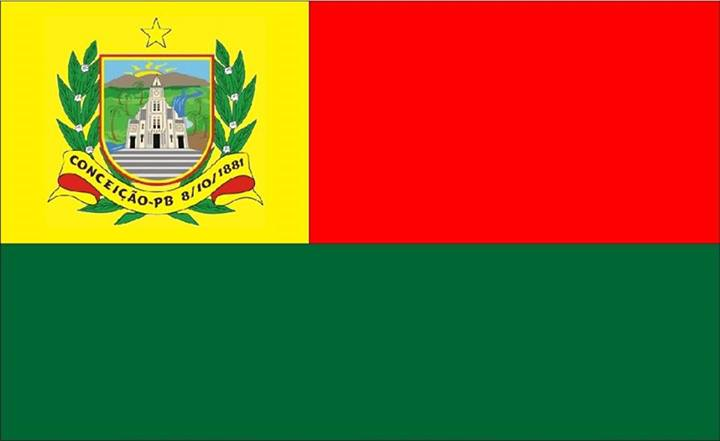
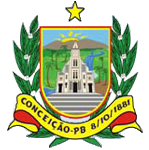
- Flag Coat of arms

- Location in Paraíba state

- Location in Brazil
- Coordinates: 7°33′43″S 38°30′32″W
- Country: Brazil
- Region: Northeast
- State: Paraíba
- Microregion: Itaporanga

Area
  - Total: 579 km^{2} (224 sq mi)

Population (2020)
  - Total: 19,007
  - Density: 32.8/km^{2} (85.0/sq mi)
- Time zone: UTC−3 (BRT)

Conceição is a municipality (município) in the state of Paraíba in Brazil. The population is 19,007 (2020 est.) in an area of 579 km^{2}. It is part of the microregion of Itaporanga.
