= Mundaú River (Ceará) =

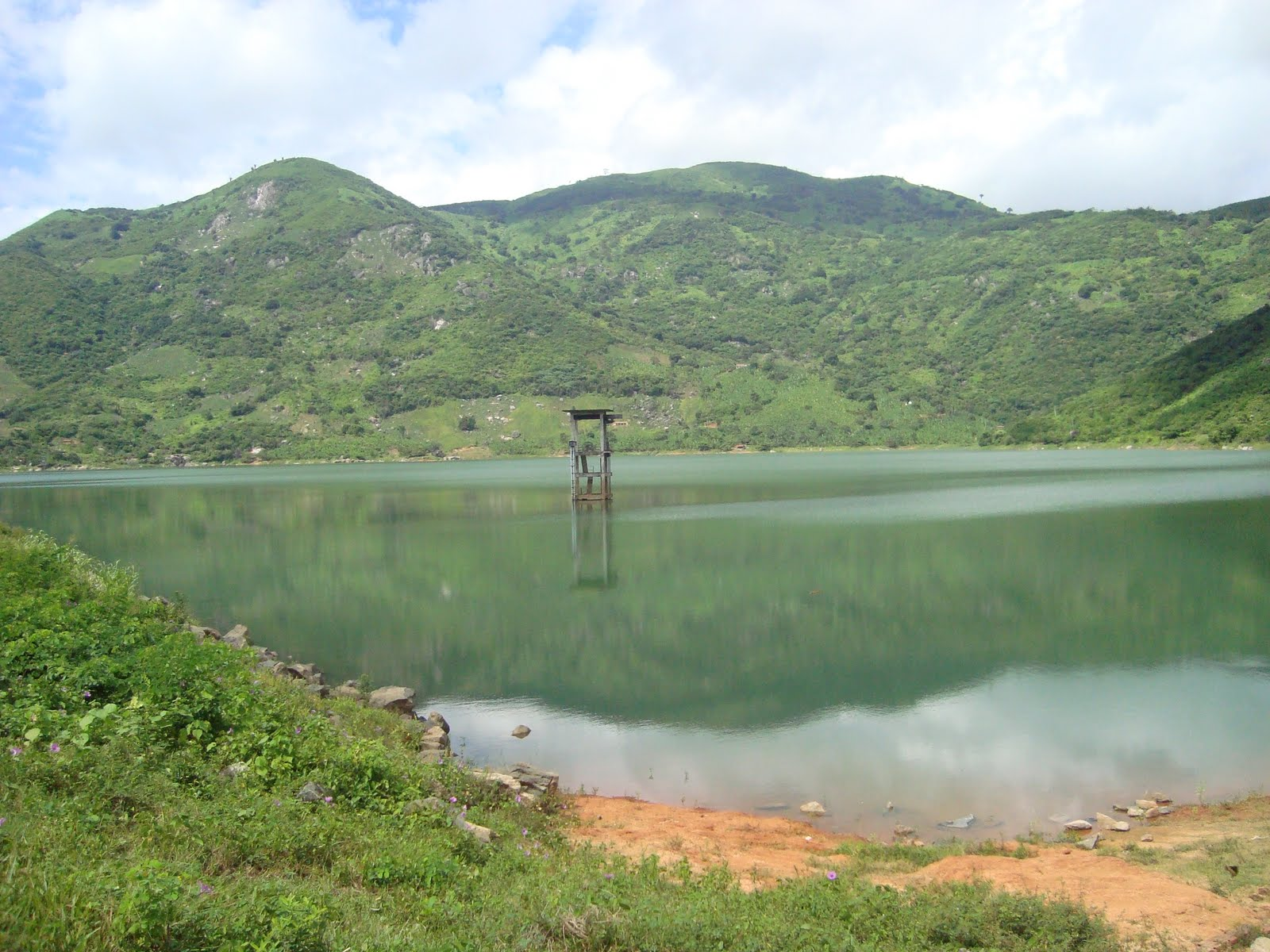

Location
- Country: Brazil

Physical characteristics
- Source
  - location: Ceará state
- Mouth: Atlantic Ocean
  - coordinates: 3°11′S 39°24′W

The Mundaú River is a river of Ceará state in eastern Brazil.

== See also ==
- List of rivers of Ceará
