= Ubatuba River =

- Mouth location in Brazil

Location
- Country: Brazil

Physical characteristics
- Source
  - location: Ceará state
- Mouth
  - coordinates: 2°56′28″S 41°19′13″W

The Ubatuba River is a river of Ceará state in eastern Brazil.

The river delta is protected by the 313,800 hectares (775,000 acres) Delta do Parnaíba Environmental Protection Area, created in 1996.

== See also ==
- List of rivers of Ceará
