= Mauriti =

Municipality in Ceará, Brazil

Coordinates: 7°23′S 38°46′W

- Municipality
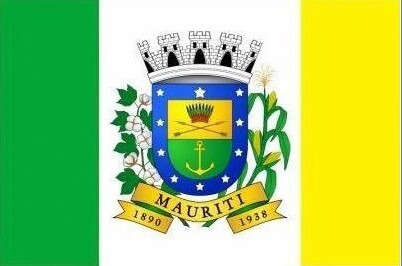
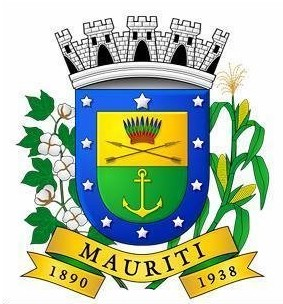
- Flag Coat of arms
- Interactive map of Mauriti
- Country: Brazil
- Region: Nordeste
- State: Ceará
- Mesoregion: Sul Cearense

Population (2020)
  - Total: 48,168
- Time zone: UTC−3 (BRT)

Mauriti (Brazilian Portuguese pronunciation: [mawɾiˈtʃi]) is a municipality in the state of Ceará in the Northeast region of Brazil.

== See also ==
- List of municipalities in Ceará
