= Salgado River (Ceará) =

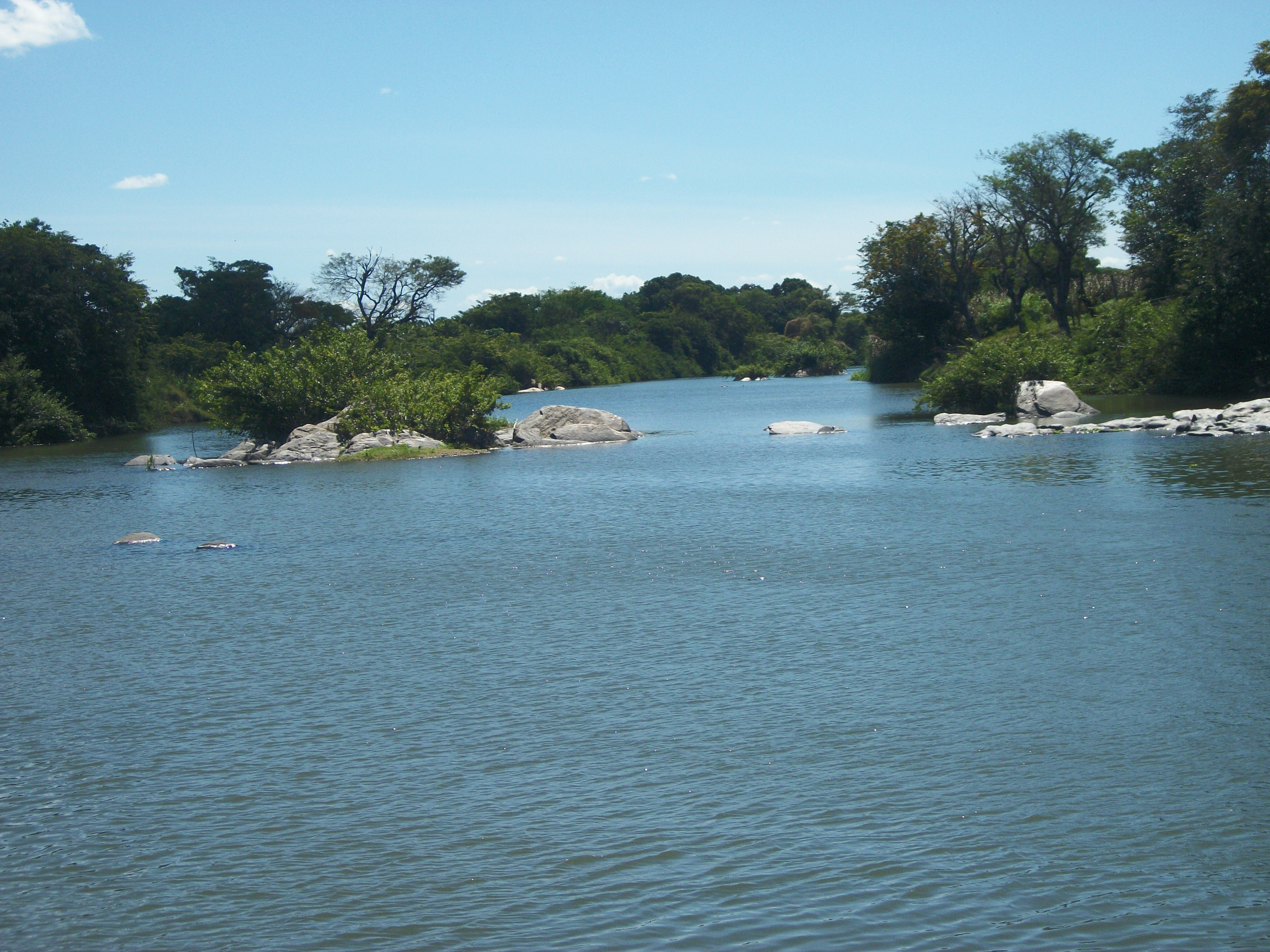

Location
- Country: Brazil

Physical characteristics
- Source
  - location: Ceará state
- Mouth: Jaguaribe River
  - coordinates: 6°16′S 38°47′W
- Length: 308 km (191 mi)

The Salgado River is a river of Ceará state in eastern Brazil.

== See also ==
- List of rivers of Ceará
