= Cocó River =

Coordinates: 3°46′15″S 38°26′08″W

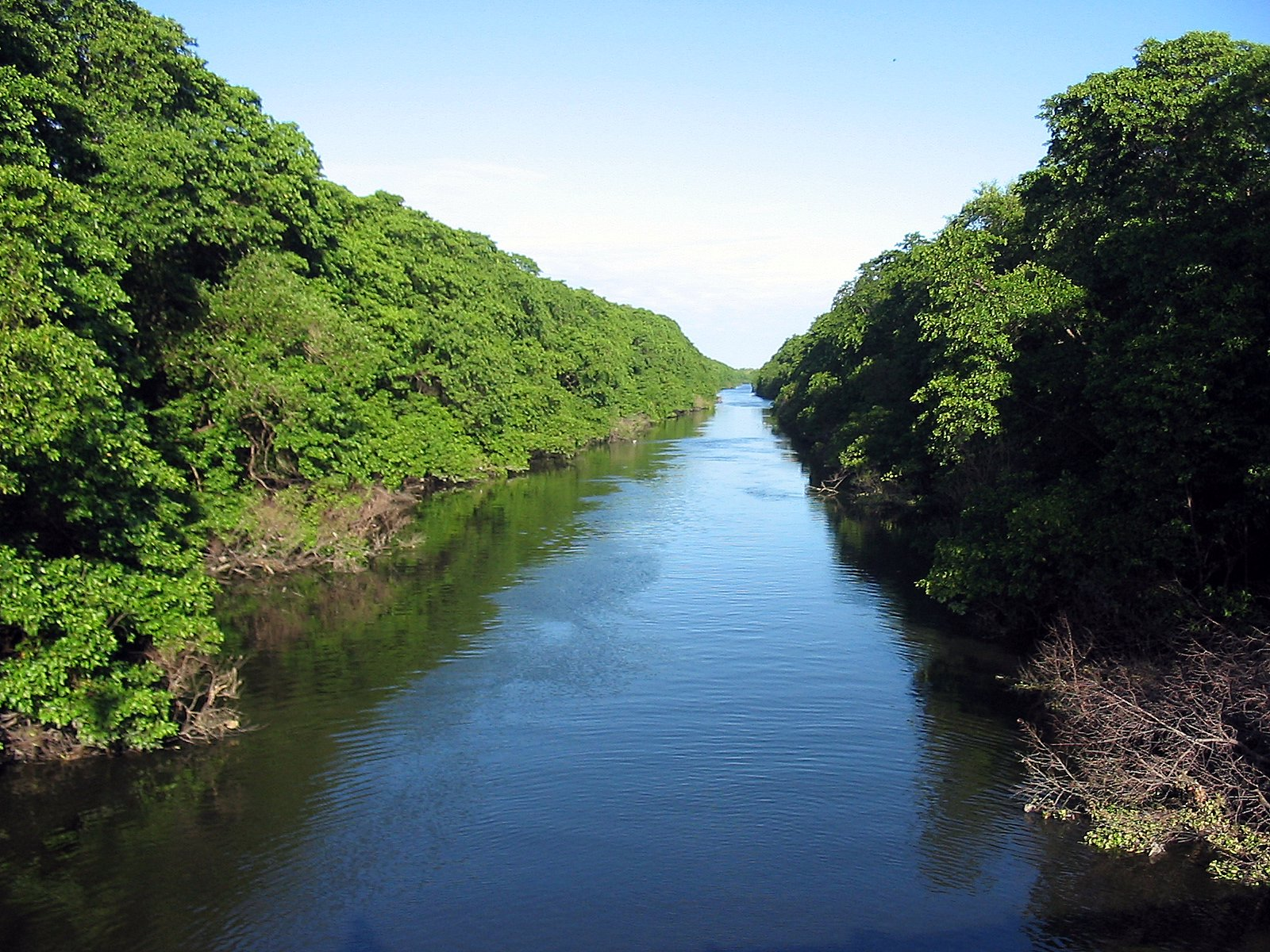

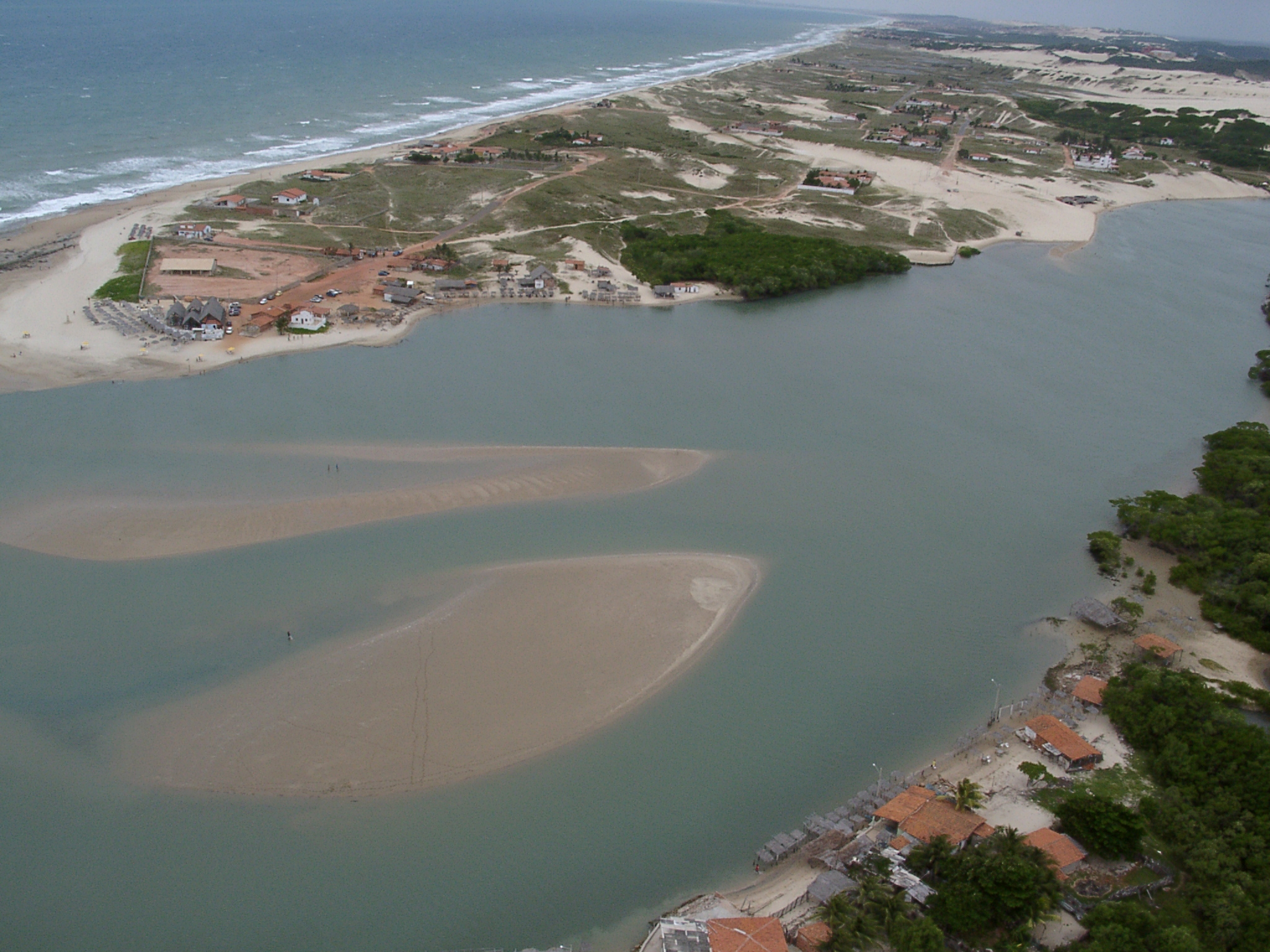
Mouth of the river at Sabiaguaba beach

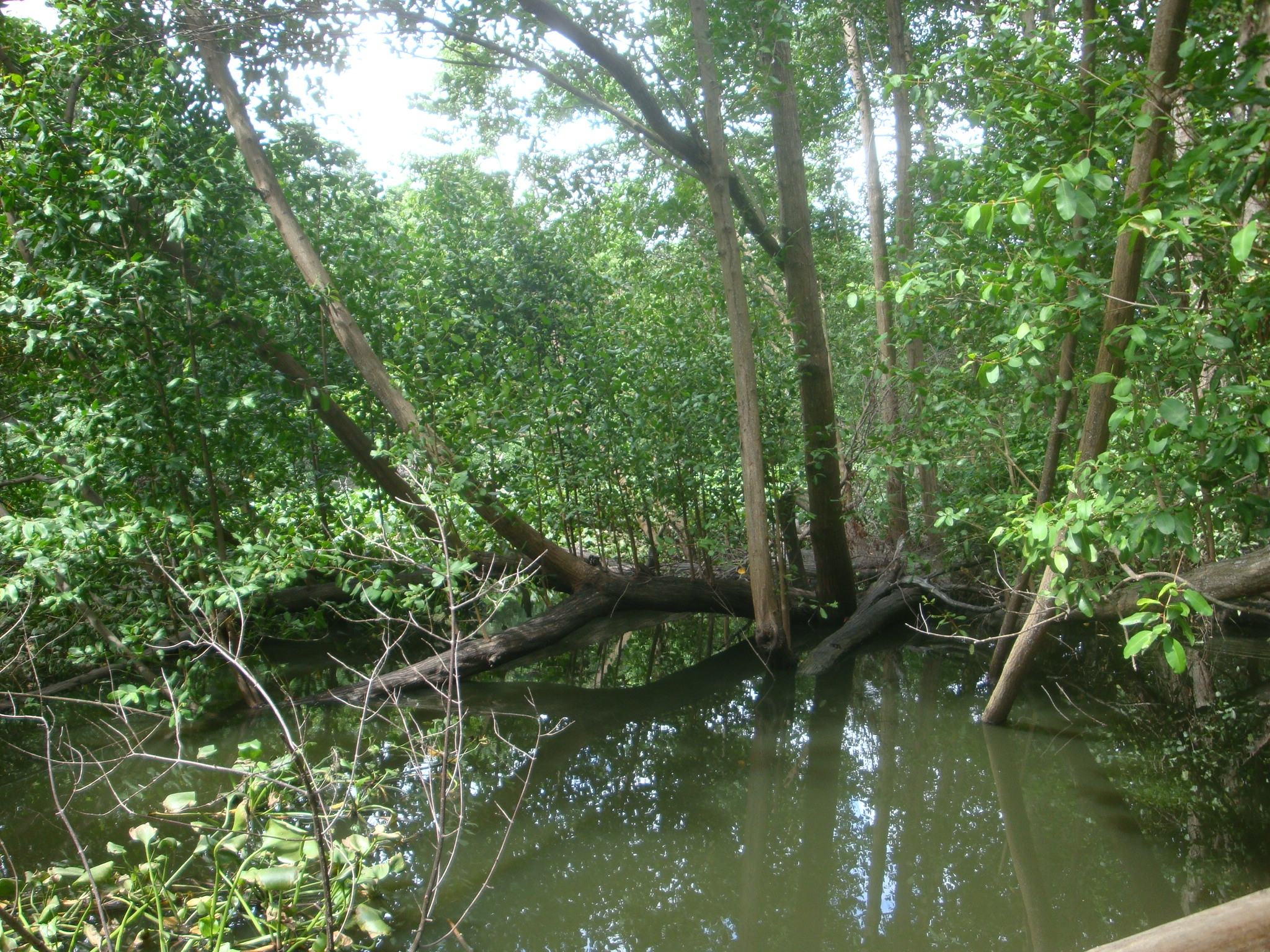
Mangroves at the mouth of the Rio Cocó

The Rio Cocó is a river in the Brazilian state of Ceará.

== Name ==
The name "Cocó" comes from the plural of the Tupi word kó, , an allusion to the agricultural practices of the indigenous people on the river.

== Course ==
The rivers starts on the eastern slope of Serra da Aratanha, in Pacatuba and passes over the course of 50 kilometers through Maracanaú, Itaitinga and Fortaleza, before discharging into the Atlantic Ocean near Sabiaguaba beach.

Between Pacatuba and Itaitinga, the river includes the Gavião Dam.

== Ecosystem ==
The mouth of the river contains an important Mangrove ecosystem that has been partially restored as part of a mangrove restoration program. A 2021 paper found that even newly restored mangroves in the delta stored a significant amount of organic carbon as a blue carbon.
