= Macaco Branco River =

Coordinates: 27°09′04″S 53°45′39″W

Location
- Country: Brazil

Physical characteristics
- Source
  - location: Santa Catarina state

The Macaco Branco River is a river of Santa Catarina state in southeastern Brazil. It is part of the Uruguay River basin.

== See also ==
- List of rivers of Santa Catarina
