= Porcos River =

River in Ceará, Brazil

Coordinates: 7°10′15″S 39°04′12″W

Location
- Country: Brazil

Physical characteristics
- Source
  - location: Ceará state

The Porcos River is a river of Ceará state in eastern Brazil.

== See also ==
- List of rivers of Ceará
