= Acaraú River =

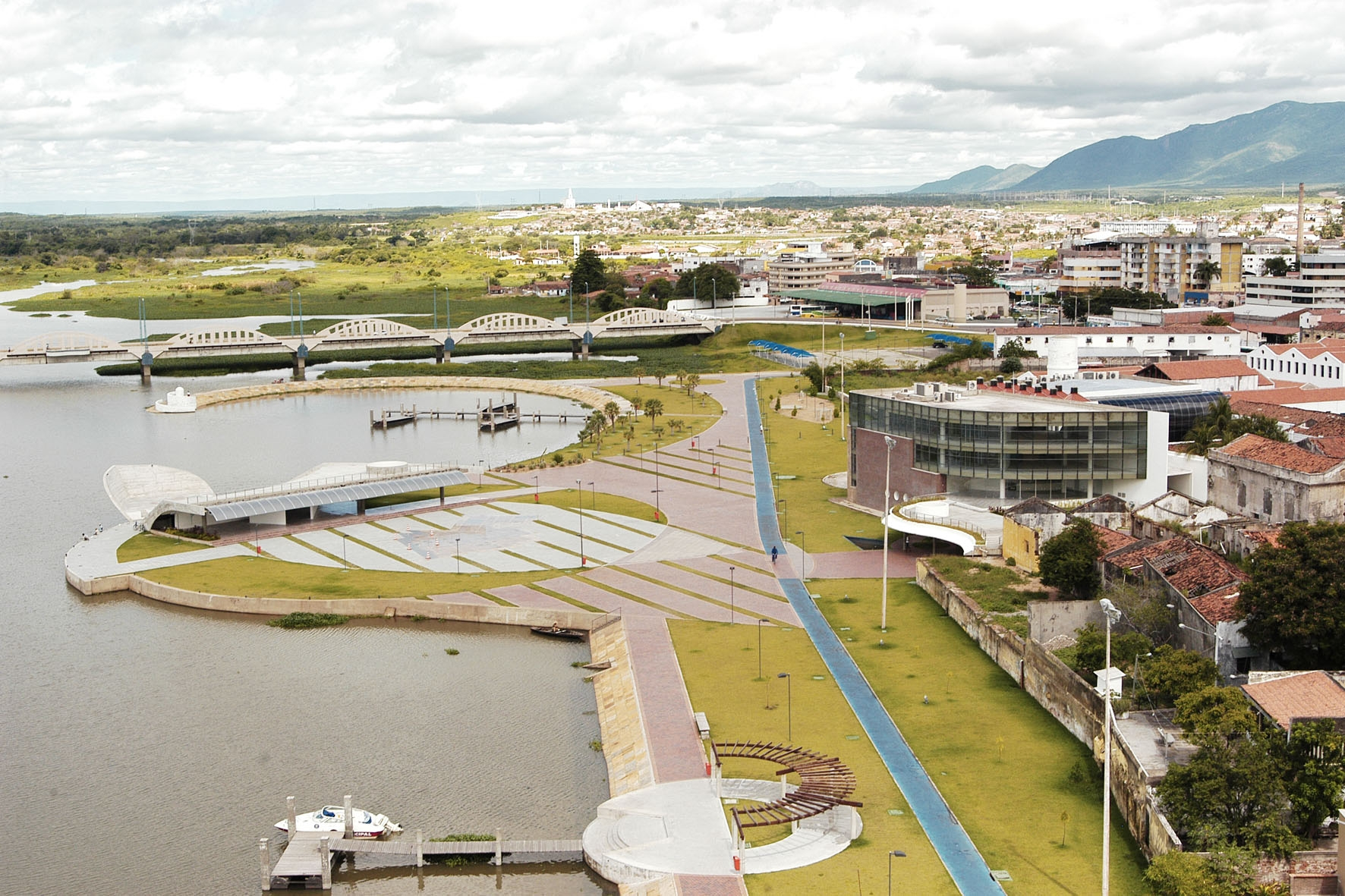

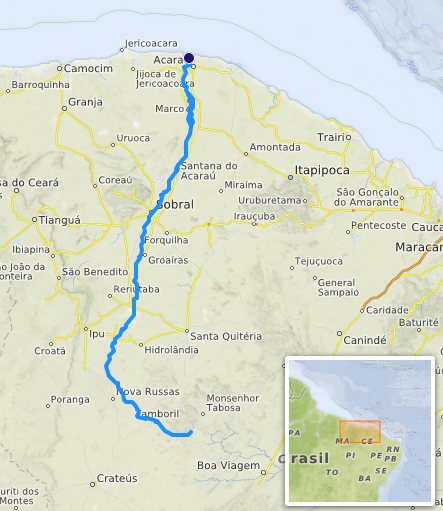

- Mouth

Location
- Country: Brazil
- State: Ceará

Physical characteristics
- Source
  - location: Monsenhor Tabosa, Ceará state
  - coordinates: 4.792338°S 40.114453°W
- Mouth: Atlantic Ocean
  - location: near Acaraú
  - coordinates: 2.840102°S 40.141761°W
- Length: 315 km (195.7 mi)
- Basin size: 14,500 km^{2} (5,598.5 sq mi)

The Acaraú River is a river of Ceará state in eastern Brazil.

== See also ==
- List of rivers of Ceará
