= Jaguaribe River =

Coordinates: 4°25′27″S 37°45′57″W

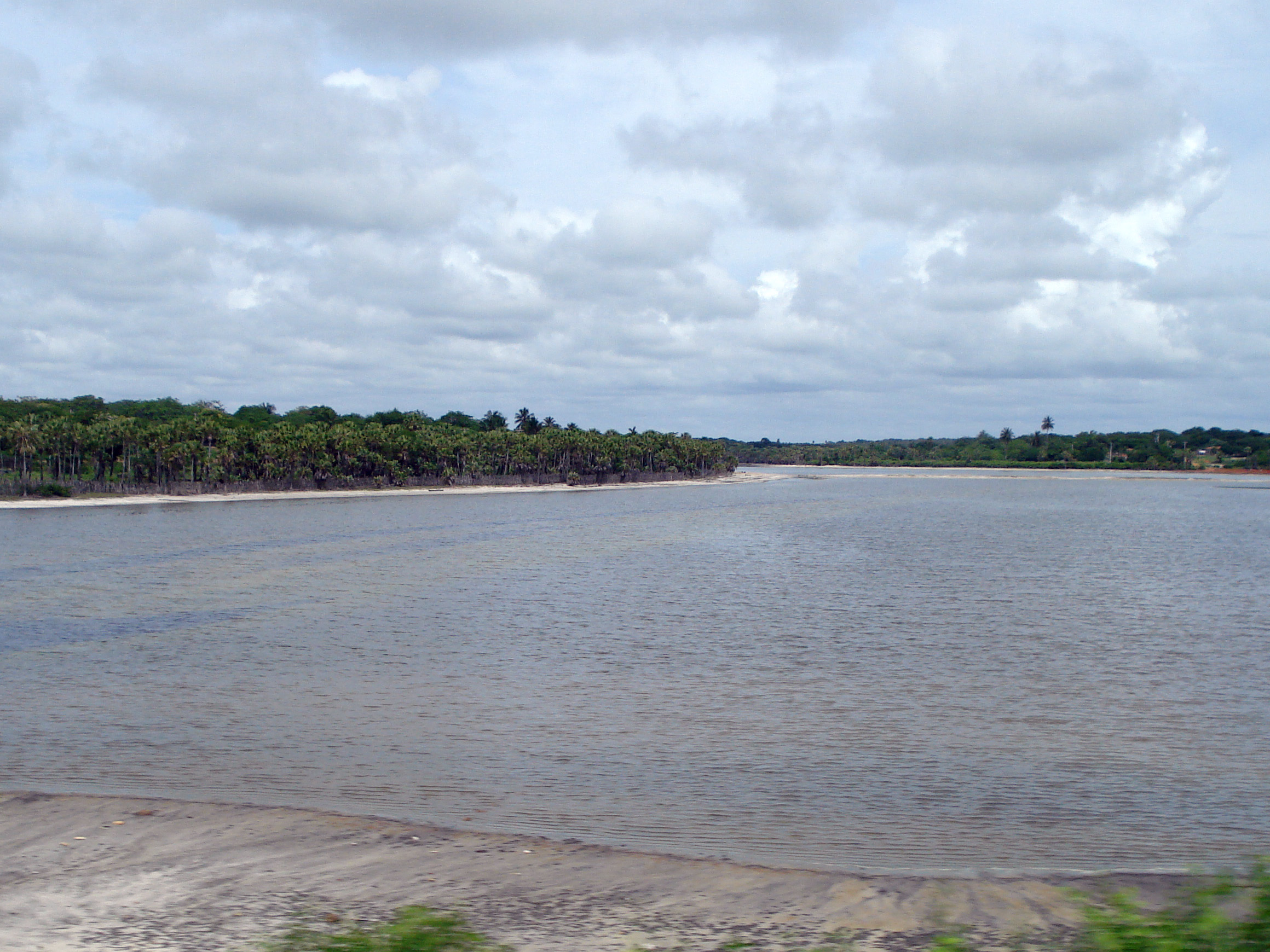
- Jaguaribe River, in the vicinity of Aracati

- Location within Brazil

Location
- Country: Brazil

Physical characteristics
- Source
  - location: Ceará state

The Jaguaribe River is a highly seasonal river in Ceará state of northeastern Brazil. Two large dams were constructed across the Jaguaribe, the Orós Dam, completed in 1960, and the Castanhão Dam, completed in 2003. The Castanhão Dam flooded the city of Jaguaribara, which was rebuilt nearby as the city of Nova Jaguaribara.

The Jaguaribe River is formed by the union of the Carrapateiras and Trici rivers, in the municipality of Tauá, both of which originate in the Serra Grande. At Tauá, the Jaguaribe is sandy and rather narrow, 50–100 metres (160–330 ft) in width. The course of the river between Tauá to the mouth of the Salgado River is approximately 250 kilometres (160 mi). Thus created, the Jaguaribe flows north for about 560 kilometers and enters the Atlantic Ocean. The Jaguaribe is infamous for its unpredictable nature; it runs dry for months before suddenly bursting its banks and flooding nearby towns.

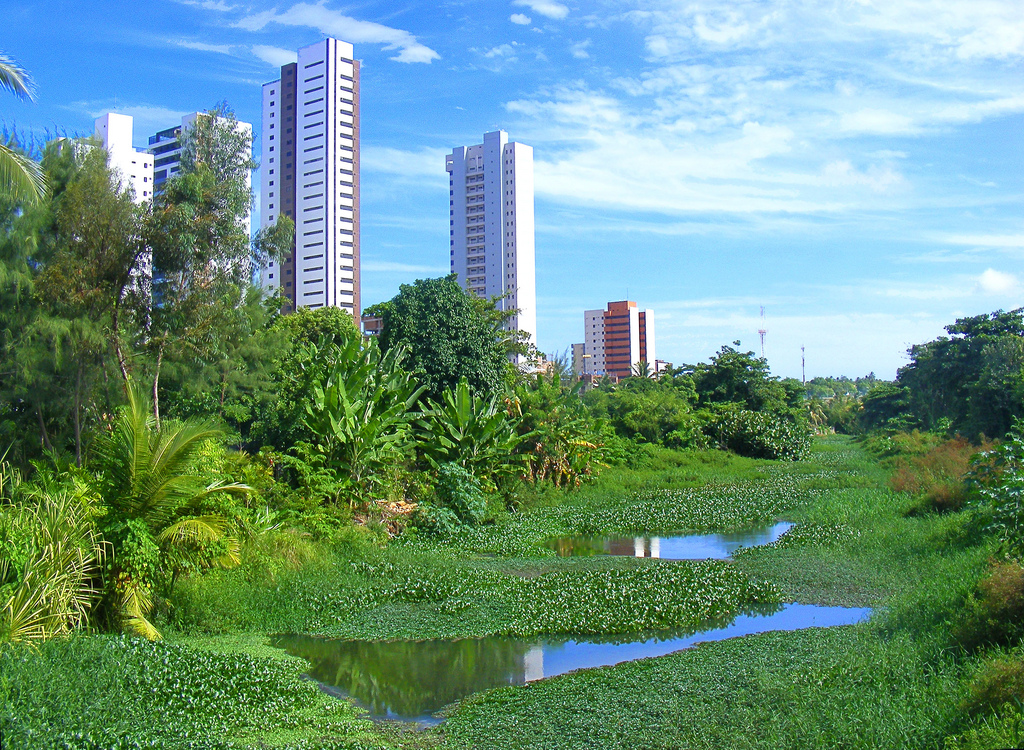
The Jaguaribe River in Paraíba
