= List of municipalities in Ceará =

Map of the official subdivisions of Ceará

Ceará (CE) is a state located in the Northeast Region of Brazil. According to the 2022 census conducted by the Brazilian Institute of Geography and Statistics (IBGE), Ceará has a population of 8,794,957 inhabitants over 146,348.3 square kilometres (56,505.4 sq mi), which makes it the 8th largest state by population and the 17th largest by area, out of 26 states. Ceará is divided into 184 municipalities, which are grouped into 33 microregions, which are grouped into 7 mesoregions.

The territory of modern Ceará was inhabited by Tupi and Jê peoples for millennia. Portuguese colonization began in 1603 with Pero Coelho de Sousa's failed settlement who established Fort São Tiago, followed by Martim Soares Moreno's establishment of Fort São Sebastião (1612). The Dutch occupied the region from 1637 to 1654, building Fort Schoonenborch. After Portuguese reconquest, cattle ranching and cotton cultivation spurred growth, though recurrent droughts—notably the Brazilian drought of 1877–1878—triggered mass migrations. Ceará became the first Brazilian province to abolish slavery in 1884, led by figures like Francisco "Dragão do Mar" Nascimento.

== Municipalities ==
| Mesoregion | Microregion | Municipality |
|---|---|---|
| Centro-Sul Cearense | Iguatu | Cedro |
| Centro-Sul Cearense | Iguatu | Icó |
| Centro-Sul Cearense | Iguatu | Iguatu |
| Centro-Sul Cearense | Iguatu | Orós |
| Centro-Sul Cearense | Iguatu | Quixelô |
| Centro-Sul Cearense | Lavras da Mangabeira | Baixio |
| Centro-Sul Cearense | Lavras da Mangabeira | Ipaumirim |
| Centro-Sul Cearense | Lavras da Mangabeira | Lavras da Mangabeira |
| Centro-Sul Cearense | Lavras da Mangabeira | Umari |
| Centro-Sul Cearense | Várzea Alegre | Antonina do Norte |
| Centro-Sul Cearense | Várzea Alegre | Cariús |
| Centro-Sul Cearense | Várzea Alegre | Jucás |
| Centro-Sul Cearense | Várzea Alegre | Tarrafas |
| Centro-Sul Cearense | Várzea Alegre | Várzea Alegre |
| Jaguaribe | Baixo Jaguaribe | Alto Santo |
| Jaguaribe | Baixo Jaguaribe | Ibicuitinga |
| Jaguaribe | Baixo Jaguaribe | Jaguaruana |
| Jaguaribe | Baixo Jaguaribe | Limoeiro do Norte |
| Jaguaribe | Baixo Jaguaribe | Morada Nova |
| Jaguaribe | Baixo Jaguaribe | Palhano |
| Jaguaribe | Baixo Jaguaribe | Quixeré |
| Jaguaribe | Baixo Jaguaribe | Russas |
| Jaguaribe | Baixo Jaguaribe | São João do Jaguaribe |
| Jaguaribe | Baixo Jaguaribe | Tabuleiro do Norte |
| Jaguaribe | Litoral de Aracati | Aracati |
| Jaguaribe | Litoral de Aracati | Fortim |
| Jaguaribe | Litoral de Aracati | Icapuí |
| Jaguaribe | Litoral de Aracati | Itaiçaba |
| Jaguaribe | Médio Jaguaribe | Jaguaretama |
| Jaguaribe | Médio Jaguaribe | Jaguaribara |
| Jaguaribe | Médio Jaguaribe | Jaguaribe |
| Jaguaribe | Serra do Pereiro | Ererê |
| Jaguaribe | Serra do Pereiro | Iracema |
| Jaguaribe | Serra do Pereiro | Pereiro |
| Jaguaribe | Serra do Pereiro | Potiretama |
| Metropolitana de Fortaleza | Fortaleza | Aquiraz |
| Metropolitana de Fortaleza | Fortaleza | Caucaia |
| Metropolitana de Fortaleza | Fortaleza | Eusébio |
| Metropolitana de Fortaleza | Fortaleza | Fortaleza (state capital) |
| Metropolitana de Fortaleza | Fortaleza | Guaiúba |
| Metropolitana de Fortaleza | Fortaleza | Itaitinga |
| Metropolitana de Fortaleza | Fortaleza | Maracanaú |
| Metropolitana de Fortaleza | Fortaleza | Maranguape |
| Metropolitana de Fortaleza | Fortaleza | Pacatuba |
| Metropolitana de Fortaleza | Pacajus | Horizonte |
| Metropolitana de Fortaleza | Pacajus | Pacajus |
| Noroeste Cearense | Coreaú | Coreaú |
| Noroeste Cearense | Coreaú | Frecheirinha |
| Noroeste Cearense | Coreaú | Moraújo |
| Noroeste Cearense | Coreaú | Uruoca |
| Noroeste Cearense | Ibiapaba | Carnaubal |
| Noroeste Cearense | Ibiapaba | Croatá |
| Noroeste Cearense | Ibiapaba | Guaraciaba do Norte |
| Noroeste Cearense | Ibiapaba | Ibiapina |
| Noroeste Cearense | Ibiapaba | São Benedito |
| Noroeste Cearense | Ibiapaba | Tianguá |
| Noroeste Cearense | Ibiapaba | Ubajara |
| Noroeste Cearense | Ibiapaba | Viçosa do Ceará |
| Noroeste Cearense | Ipu | Ipu |
| Noroeste Cearense | Ipu | Ipueiras |
| Noroeste Cearense | Ipu | Pires Ferreira |
| Noroeste Cearense | Ipu | Poranga |
| Noroeste Cearense | Ipu | Reriutaba |
| Noroeste Cearense | Ipu | Varjota |
| Noroeste Cearense | Litoral de Camocim e Acaraú | Acaraú |
| Noroeste Cearense | Litoral de Camocim e Acaraú | Barroquinha |
| Noroeste Cearense | Litoral de Camocim e Acaraú | Bela Cruz |
| Noroeste Cearense | Litoral de Camocim e Acaraú | Camocim |
| Noroeste Cearense | Litoral de Camocim e Acaraú | Chaval |
| Noroeste Cearense | Litoral de Camocim e Acaraú | Cruz |
| Noroeste Cearense | Litoral de Camocim e Acaraú | Granja |
| Noroeste Cearense | Litoral de Camocim e Acaraú | Itarema |
| Noroeste Cearense | Litoral de Camocim e Acaraú | Jijoca de Jericoacoara |
| Noroeste Cearense | Litoral de Camocim e Acaraú | Marco |
| Noroeste Cearense | Litoral de Camocim e Acaraú | Martinópole |
| Noroeste Cearense | Litoral de Camocim e Acaraú | Morrinhos |
| Noroeste Cearense | Meruoca | Alcântaras |
| Noroeste Cearense | Meruoca | Meruoca |
| Noroeste Cearense | Santa Quitéria | Catunda |
| Noroeste Cearense | Santa Quitéria | Hidrolândia |
| Noroeste Cearense | Santa Quitéria | Santa Quitéria |
| Noroeste Cearense | Sobral | Cariré |
| Noroeste Cearense | Sobral | Forquilha |
| Noroeste Cearense | Sobral | Graça |
| Noroeste Cearense | Sobral | Groaíras |
| Noroeste Cearense | Sobral | Irauçuba |
| Noroeste Cearense | Sobral | Massapê |
| Noroeste Cearense | Sobral | Miraíma |
| Noroeste Cearense | Sobral | Mucambo |
| Noroeste Cearense | Sobral | Pacujá |
| Noroeste Cearense | Sobral | Santana do Acaraú |
| Noroeste Cearense | Sobral | Senador Sá |
| Noroeste Cearense | Sobral | Sobral |
| Norte Cearense | Baixo Curu | Paracuru |
| Norte Cearense | Baixo Curu | Paraipaba |
| Norte Cearense | Baixo Curu | São Gonçalo do Amarante |
| Norte Cearense | Baturité | Acarape |
| Norte Cearense | Baturité | Aracoiaba |
| Norte Cearense | Baturité | Aratuba |
| Norte Cearense | Baturité | Baturité |
| Norte Cearense | Baturité | Capistrano |
| Norte Cearense | Baturité | Guaramiranga |
| Norte Cearense | Baturité | Itapiúna |
| Norte Cearense | Baturité | Mulungu |
| Norte Cearense | Baturité | Pacoti |
| Norte Cearense | Baturité | Palmácia |
| Norte Cearense | Baturité | Redenção |
| Norte Cearense | Canindé | Canindé |
| Norte Cearense | Canindé | Caridade |
| Norte Cearense | Canindé | Itatira |
| Norte Cearense | Canindé | Paramoti |
| Norte Cearense | Cascavel | Beberibe |
| Norte Cearense | Cascavel | Cascavel |
| Norte Cearense | Cascavel | Pindoretama |
| Norte Cearense | Chorozinho | Barreira |
| Norte Cearense | Chorozinho | Chorozinho |
| Norte Cearense | Chorozinho | Ocara |
| Norte Cearense | Itapipoca | Amontada |
| Norte Cearense | Itapipoca | Itapipoca |
| Norte Cearense | Itapipoca | Trairi |
| Norte Cearense | Médio Curu | Apuiarés |
| Norte Cearense | Médio Curu | General Sampaio |
| Norte Cearense | Médio Curu | Pentecoste |
| Norte Cearense | Médio Curu | São Luís do Curu |
| Norte Cearense | Médio Curu | Tejuçuoca |
| Norte Cearense | Uruburetama | Itapagé |
| Norte Cearense | Uruburetama | Tururu |
| Norte Cearense | Uruburetama | Umirim |
| Norte Cearense | Uruburetama | Uruburetama |
| Sertões Cearenses | Sertão de Crateús | Ararendá |
| Sertões Cearenses | Sertão de Crateús | Crateús |
| Sertões Cearenses | Sertão de Crateús | Independência |
| Sertões Cearenses | Sertão de Crateús | Ipaporanga |
| Sertões Cearenses | Sertão de Crateús | Monsenhor Tabosa |
| Sertões Cearenses | Sertão de Crateús | Nova Russas |
| Sertões Cearenses | Sertão de Crateús | Novo Oriente |
| Sertões Cearenses | Sertão de Crateús | Quiterianópolis |
| Sertões Cearenses | Sertão de Crateús | Tamboril |
| Sertões Cearenses | Sertão de Inhamuís | Aiuaba |
| Sertões Cearenses | Sertão de Inhamuís | Arneiroz |
| Sertões Cearenses | Sertão de Inhamuís | Catarina |
| Sertões Cearenses | Sertão de Inhamuís | Parambu |
| Sertões Cearenses | Sertão de Inhamuís | Saboeiro |
| Sertões Cearenses | Sertão de Inhamuís | Tauá |
| Sertões Cearenses | Sertão de Quixeramobim | Banabuiú |
| Sertões Cearenses | Sertão de Quixeramobim | Boa Viagem |
| Sertões Cearenses | Sertão de Quixeramobim | Choró |
| Sertões Cearenses | Sertão de Quixeramobim | Ibaretama |
| Sertões Cearenses | Sertão de Quixeramobim | Madalena |
| Sertões Cearenses | Sertão de Quixeramobim | Quixadá |
| Sertões Cearenses | Sertão de Quixeramobim | Quixeramobim |
| Sertões Cearenses | Sertão de Senador Pompeu | Acopiara |
| Sertões Cearenses | Sertão de Senador Pompeu | Deputado Irapuan Pinheiro |
| Sertões Cearenses | Sertão de Senador Pompeu | Milhã |
| Sertões Cearenses | Sertão de Senador Pompeu | Mombaça |
| Sertões Cearenses | Sertão de Senador Pompeu | Pedra Branca |
| Sertões Cearenses | Sertão de Senador Pompeu | Piquet Carneiro |
| Sertões Cearenses | Sertão de Senador Pompeu | Senador Pompeu |
| Sertões Cearenses | Sertão de Senador Pompeu | Solonópole |
| Sul Cearense | Barro | Aurora |
| Sul Cearense | Barro | Barro |
| Sul Cearense | Barro | Mauriti |
| Sul Cearense | Brejo Santo | Abaiara |
| Sul Cearense | Brejo Santo | Brejo Santo |
| Sul Cearense | Brejo Santo | Jati |
| Sul Cearense | Brejo Santo | Milagres |
| Sul Cearense | Brejo Santo | Penaforte |
| Sul Cearense | Cariri | Barbalha |
| Sul Cearense | Cariri | Crato |
| Sul Cearense | Cariri | Jardim |
| Sul Cearense | Cariri | Juazeiro do Norte |
| Sul Cearense | Cariri | Missão Velha |
| Sul Cearense | Cariri | Nova Olinda |
| Sul Cearense | Cariri | Porteiras |
| Sul Cearense | Cariri | Santana do Cariri |
| Sul Cearense | Caririaçu | Altaneira |
| Sul Cearense | Caririaçu | Caririaçu |
| Sul Cearense | Caririaçu | Farias Brito |
| Sul Cearense | Caririaçu | Granjeiro |
| Sul Cearense | Chapada do Araripe | Araripe |
| Sul Cearense | Chapada do Araripe | Assaré |
| Sul Cearense | Chapada do Araripe | Campos Sales |
| Sul Cearense | Chapada do Araripe | Potengi |
| Sul Cearense | Chapada do Araripe | Salitre |

== See also ==
- Geography of Brazil
- List of cities in Brazil
