= Hidrolândia =

Hidrolândia may refer to the following places in Brazil:

- Hidrolândia, Ceará
- Hidrolândia, Goiás
