= Altaneira =

Municipality in Ceará, Brazil

Coordinates: 7.00194°S 39.7408°W

- Municipality
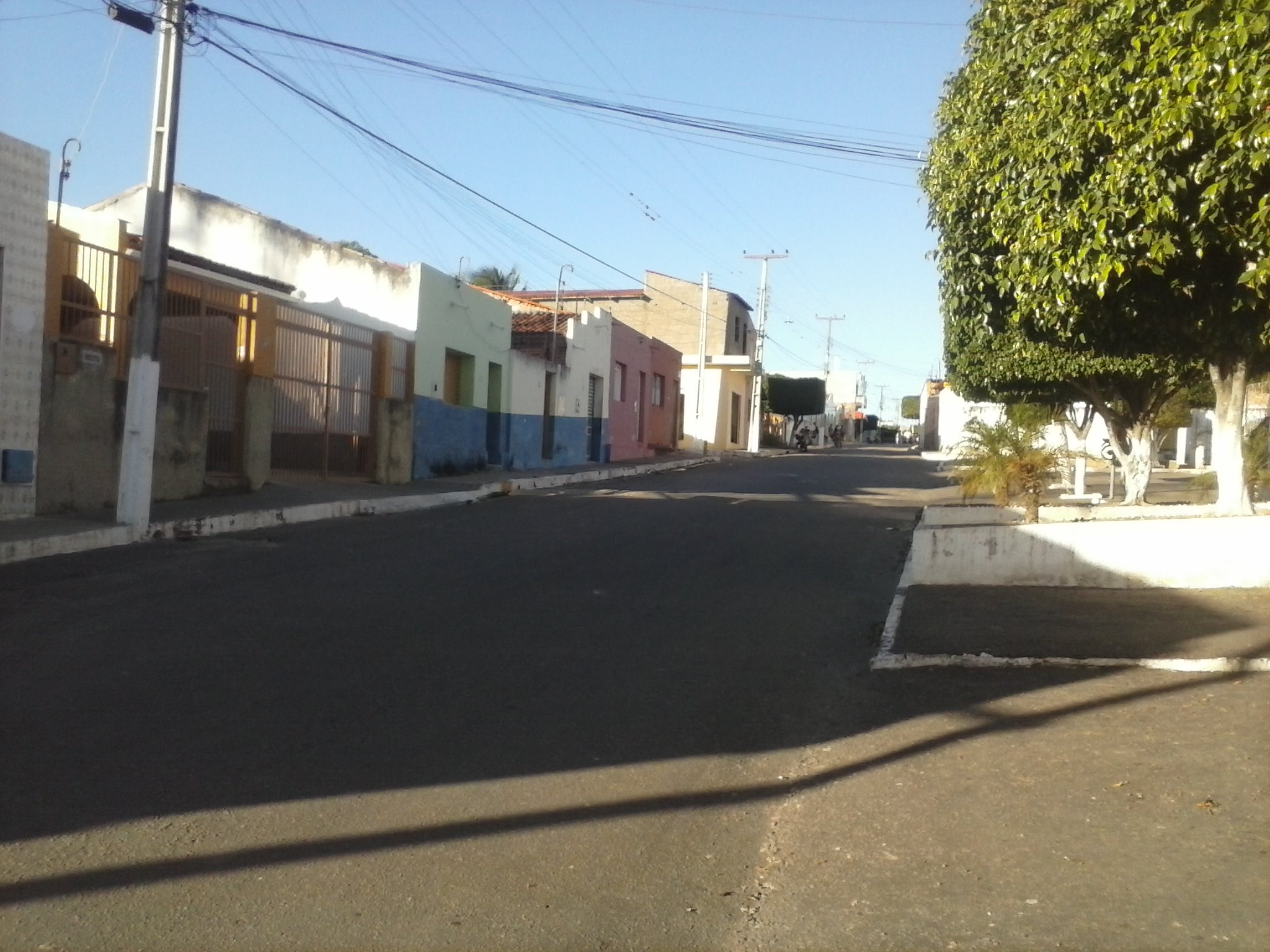
- Altaneira - panoramio

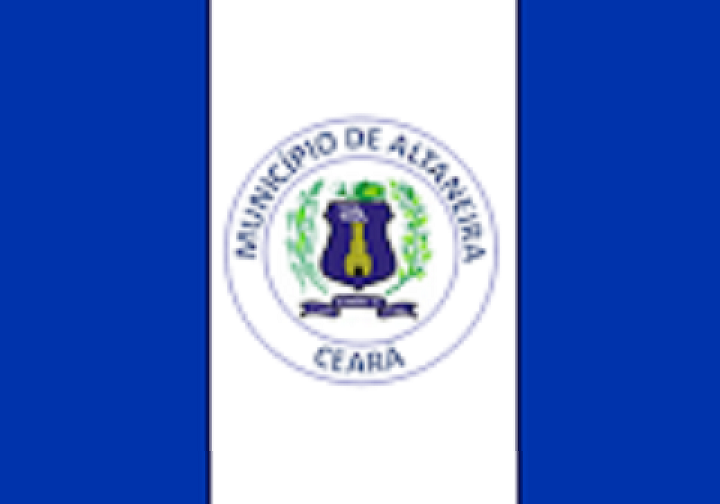
- Flag
- Interactive map of Altaneira
- Country: Brazil
- Region: Nordeste
- State: Ceará
- Mesoregion: Sul Cearense

Government
  - Mayor: Joaquim Soares Neto (PSB)

Population (2020)
  - Total: 7,650
- Time zone: UTC−3 (BRT)

Altaneira is a municipality in the state of Ceará in the Northeast region of Brazil.

== See also ==
- List of municipalities in Ceará
