= Caridade =

Municipality in Ceará, Brazil

Coordinates: 4°13′55″S 39°11′34″W

- Municipality
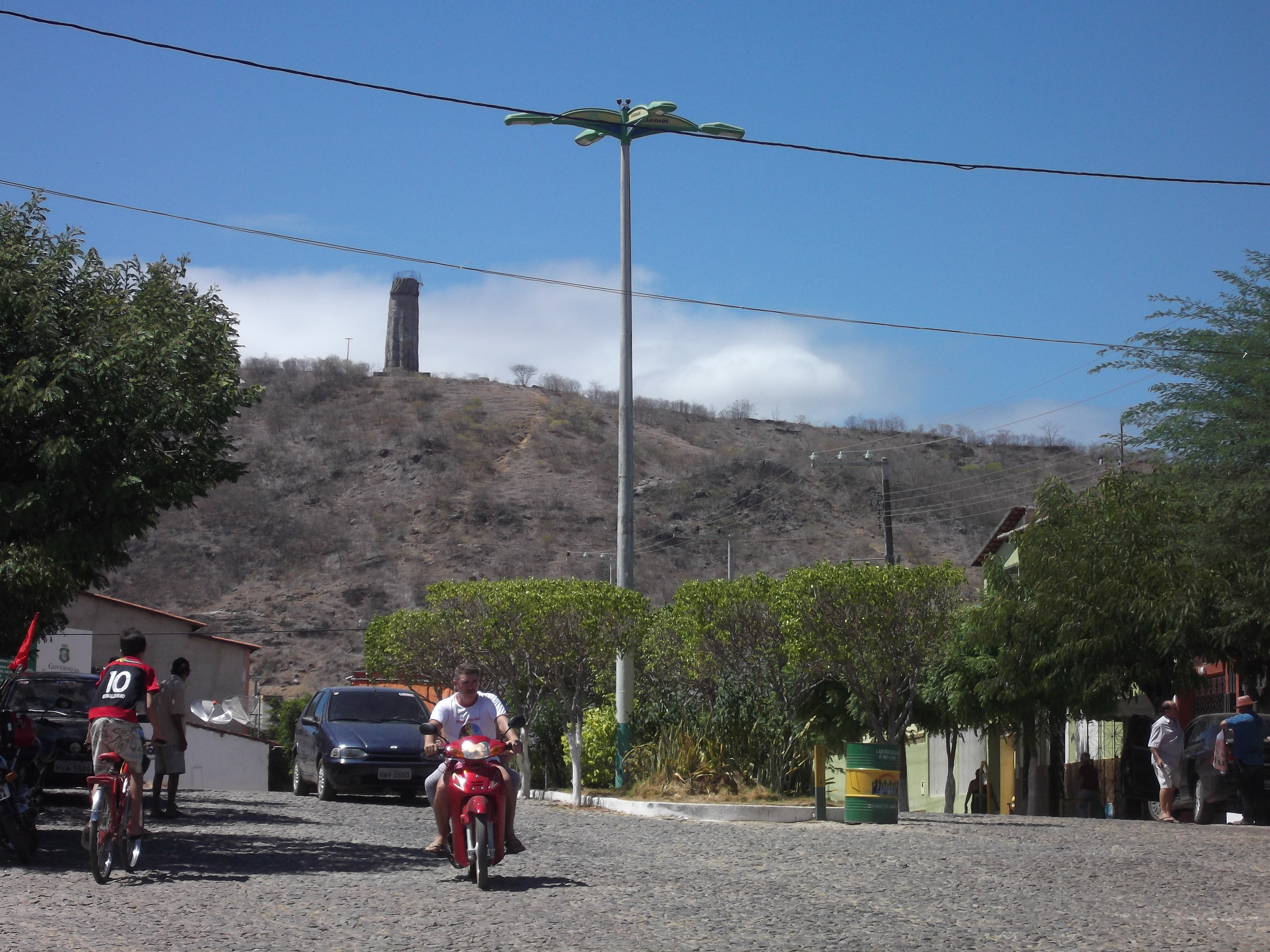

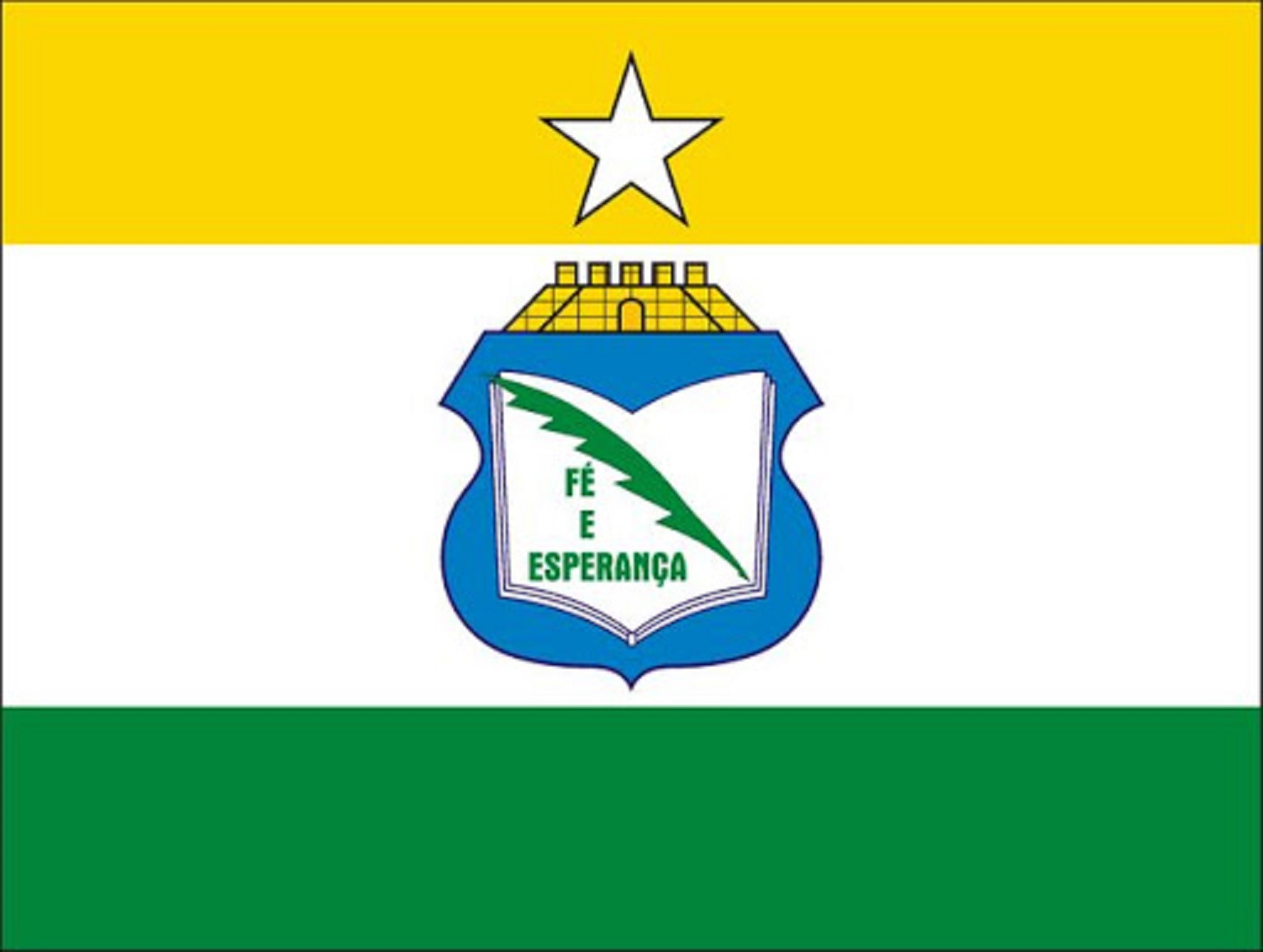
- Flag
- Interactive map of Caridade
- Country: Brazil
- Region: Nordeste
- State: Ceará
- Mesoregion: Noroeste Cearense

Population (2020)
  - Total: 22,782
- Time zone: UTC−3 (BRT)

Caridade is a municipality in the state of Ceará in the Northeast region of Brazil.

== See also ==
- List of municipalities in Ceará
