= Arneiroz =

Municipality in Ceará, Brazil

Coordinates: 6°20′S 40°08′W

- Municipality
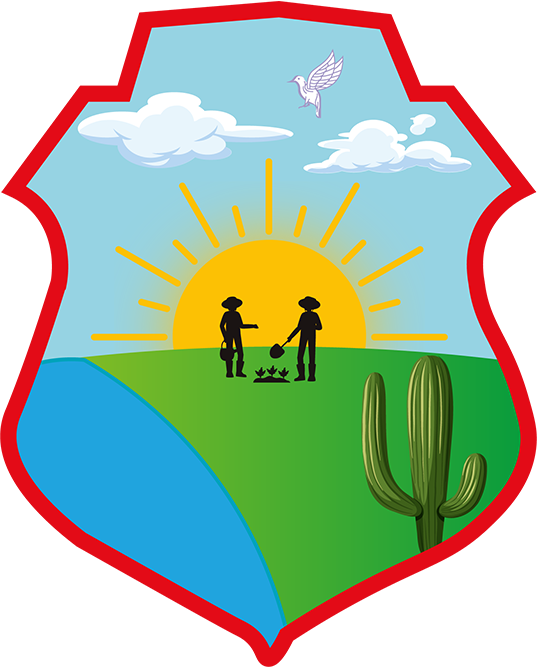
- Coat of arms
- Interactive map of Arneiroz
- Country: Brazil
- Region: Nordeste
- State: Ceará
- Mesoregion: Sertoes Cearenses

Population (2020)
  - Total: 7,844
- Time zone: UTC−3 (BRT)

Arneiroz is a municipality in the state of Ceará in the Northeast region of Brazil.

== See also ==
- List of municipalities in Ceará
