= Fortim =

Municipality in Ceará, Brazil

Coordinates: 4°27′S 37°47′W

- Municipality
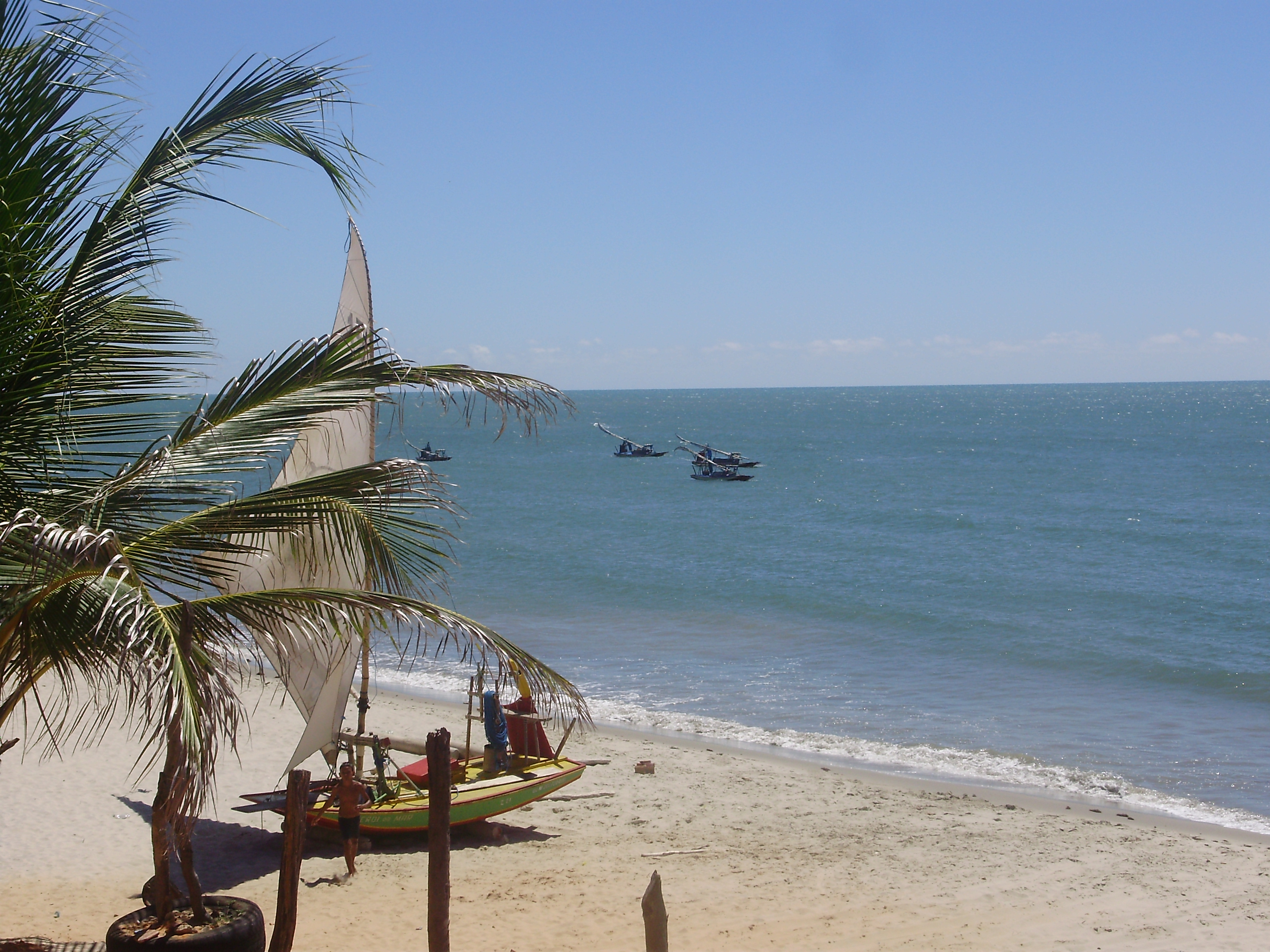
- Fortim Beach, one of the most beautiful beaches in the world.

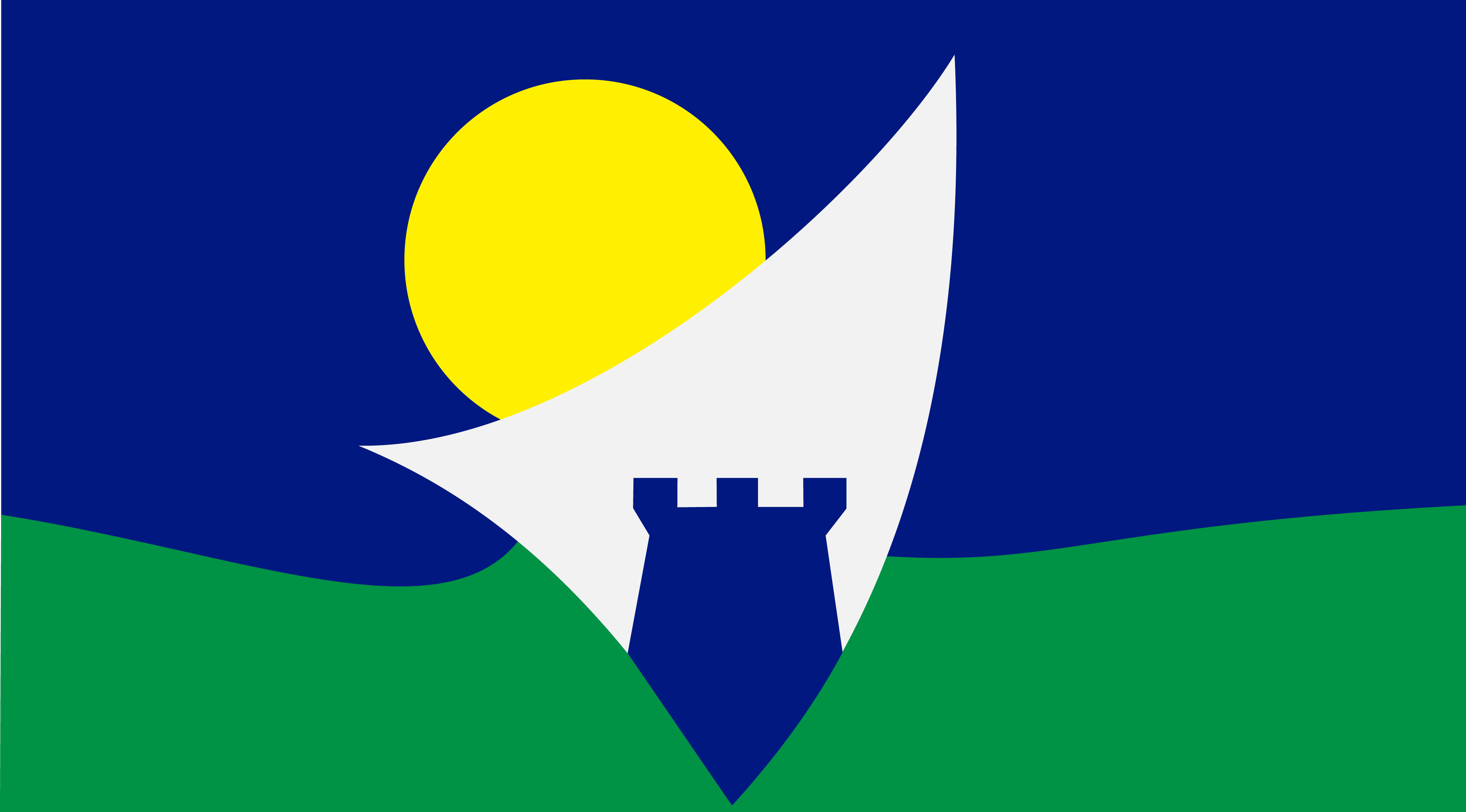
- Flag

- Location of Fortim in Ceará
- Coordinates: 4° 27' 07" S 37° 47' 49" W
- Country: Brazil
- Region: Nordeste
- State: Ceará
- Mesoregion: Jaguaribe
- Established: March 27, 1992 (29 years old)

Government
  - Type: Brazilian Democratic Movement
- Elevation: 13 ft (4 m)

Population (2020)
  - Total: 16,631
  - Density: 154/sq mi (59.4/km^{2})
- Time zone: UTC−3 (BRT)

Fortim is a municipality in the state of Ceará in the Northeast region of Brazil.

== See also ==
- List of municipalities in Ceará
