= Novo Oriente =

Municipality in Ceará, Brazil

Coordinates: 5.53389°S 40.7739°W

- Municipality
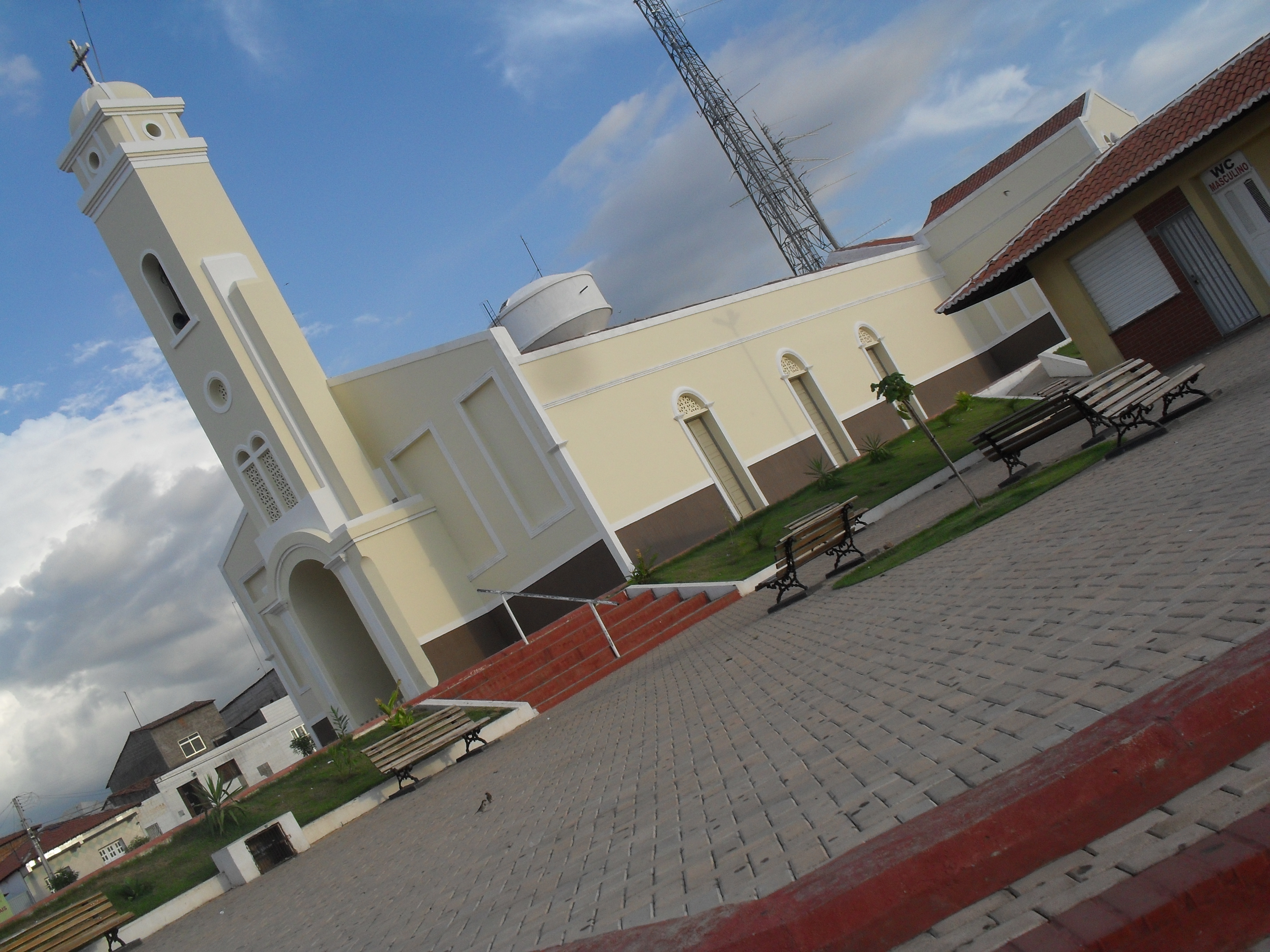

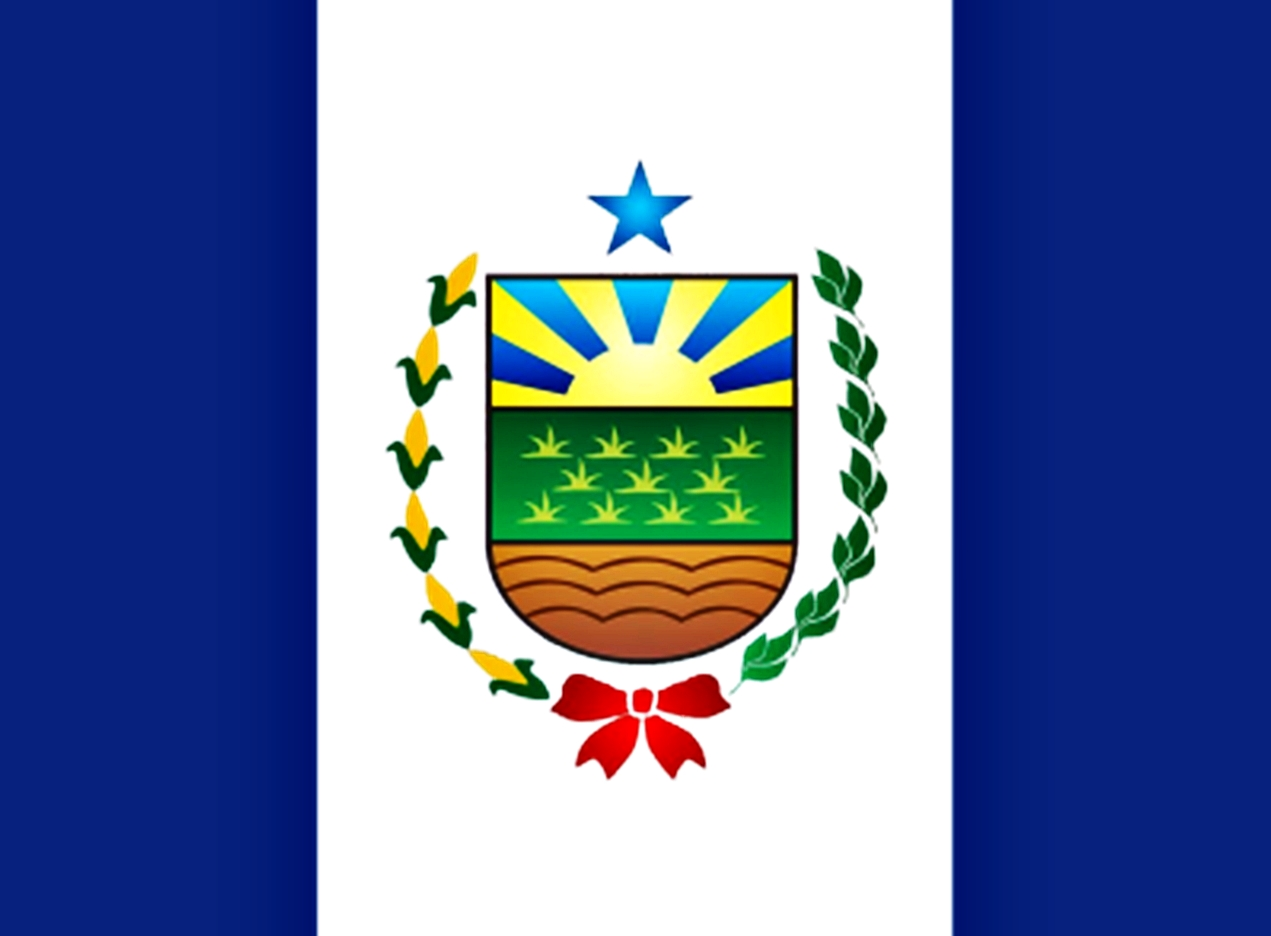
- Flag
- Interactive map of Novo Oriente
- Country: Brazil
- Region: Nordeste
- State: Ceará
- Mesoregion: Sertoes Cearenses

Population (2020)
  - Total: 28,673
- Time zone: UTC−3 (BRT)

Novo Oriente is a municipality in the state of Ceará in the Northeast region of Brazil.

== See also ==
- List of municipalities in Ceará
