= Tururu =

Municipality in Ceará, Brazil

Coordinates: 3°35′S 39°27′W

- Municipality
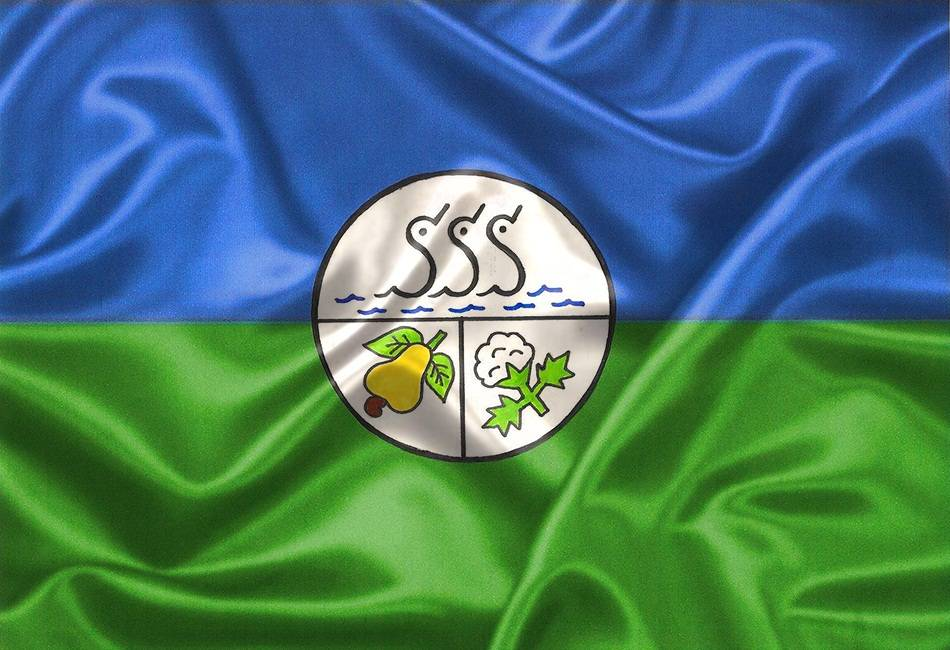
- Flag
- Interactive map of Tururu
- Country: Brazil
- Region: Nordeste
- State: Ceará
- Mesoregion: Noroeste Cearense

Population (2020)
  - Total: 16,431
- Time zone: UTC−3 (BRT)

Tururu is a municipality in the state of Ceará in the Northeast region of Brazil.

Its name, in Tupi, means snail's place.

== See also ==
- List of municipalities in Ceará
