= Ibicuitinga =

Municipality in Ceará, Brazil

Coordinates: 4°59′S 38°39′W

- Municipality
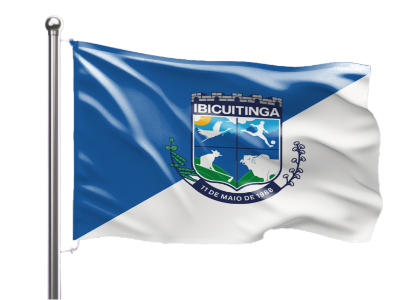
- Flag
- Interactive map of Ibicuitinga
- Country: Brazil
- Region: Nordeste
- State: Ceará
- Mesoregion: Jaguaribe

Population (2020)
  - Total: 12,629
- Time zone: UTC−3 (BRT)

Ibicuitinga is a municipality in the state of Ceará in the Northeast region of Brazil.

== See also ==
- List of municipalities in Ceará
