= Iracema, Ceará =

Municipality in Ceará, Brazil

Coordinates: 5°48′43″S 38°18′21″W

Iracema
- Municipality
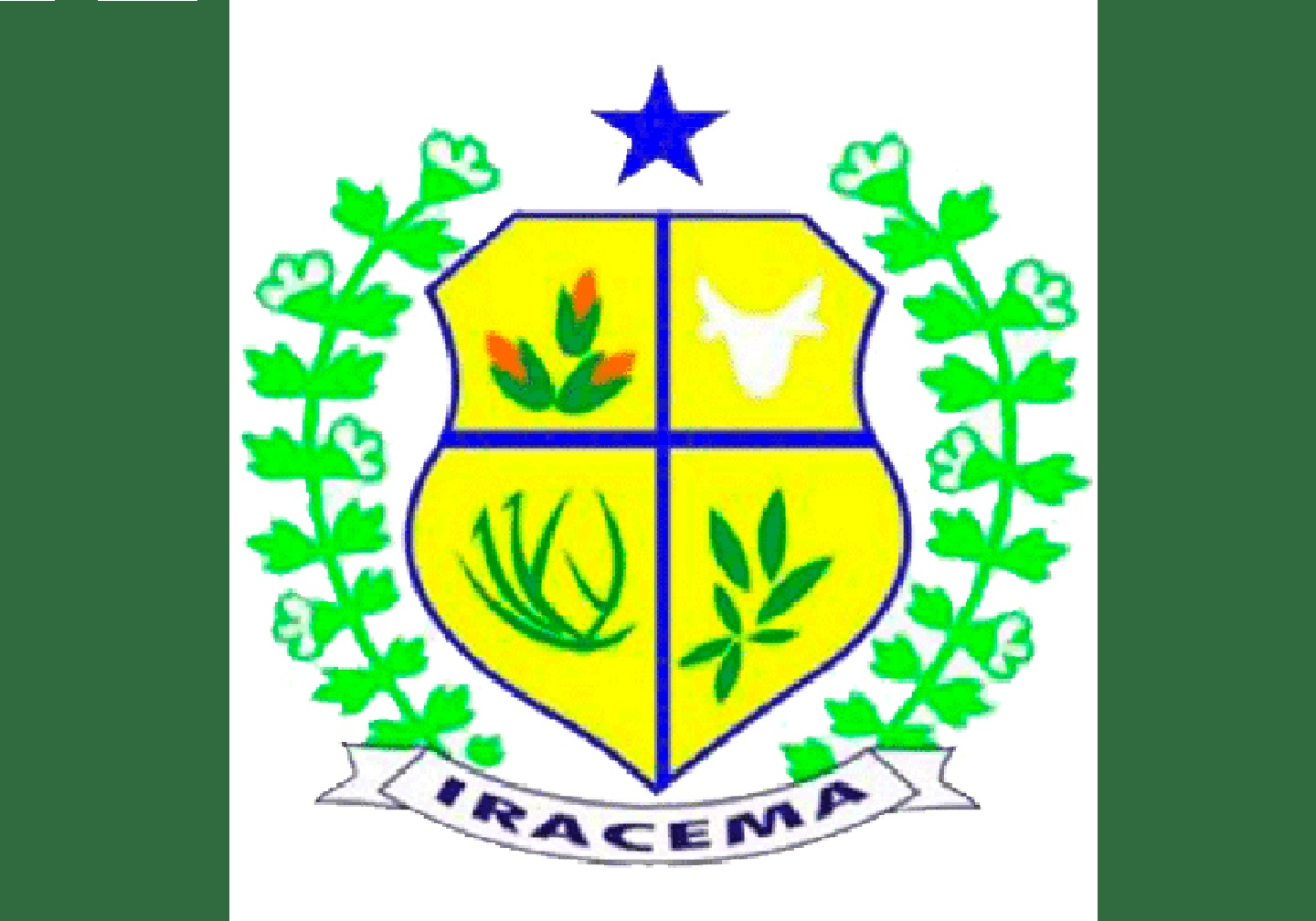
- Flag
- Interactive map of Iracema
- Country: Brazil
- Region: Nordeste
- State: Ceará
- Mesoregion: Jaguaribe

Population (2020)
  - Total: 14,326
- Time zone: UTC−3 (BRT)

Iracema is a municipality located in the state of Ceará in the Northeast region of Brazil.

== See also ==
- List of municipalities in Ceará
