= Frecheirinha =

Municipality in Ceará, Brazil

Coordinates: 3°46′S 40°48′W

- Municipality
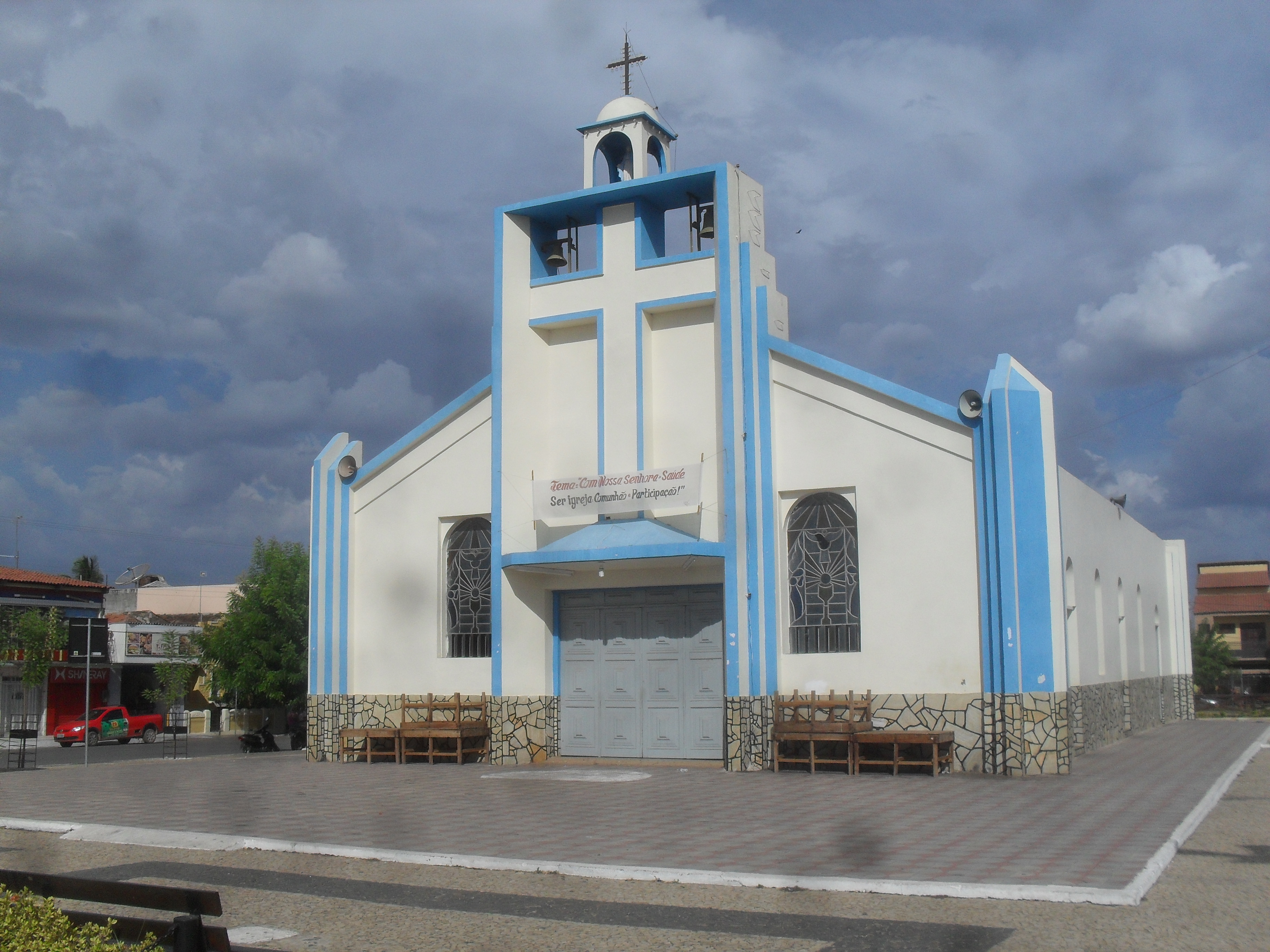

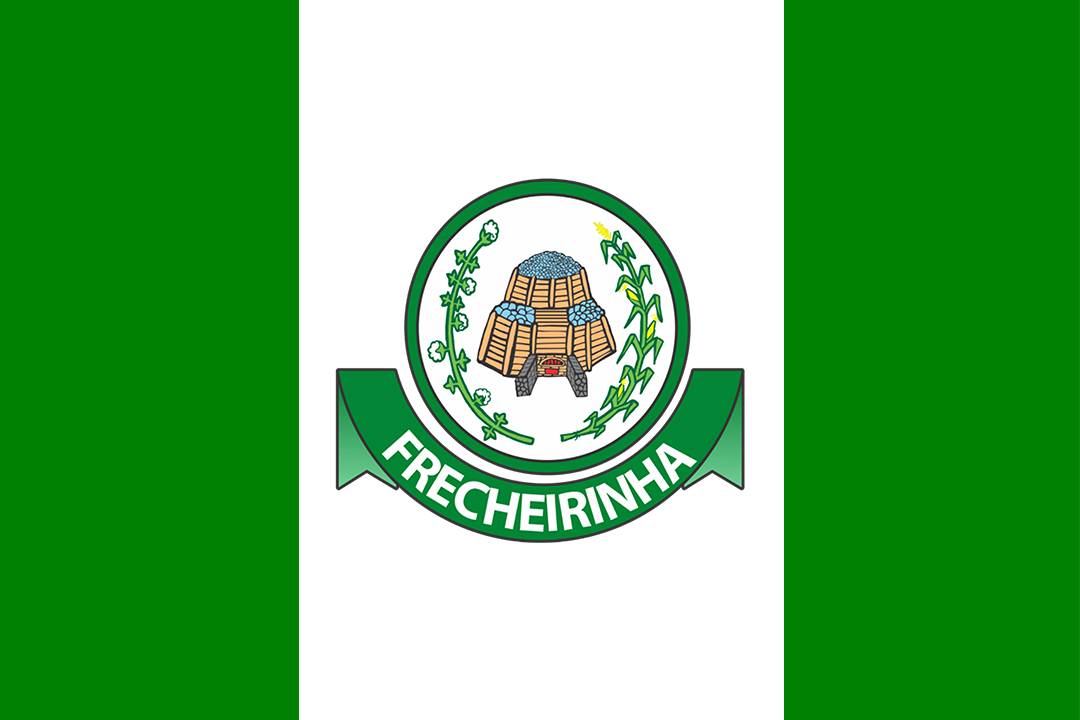
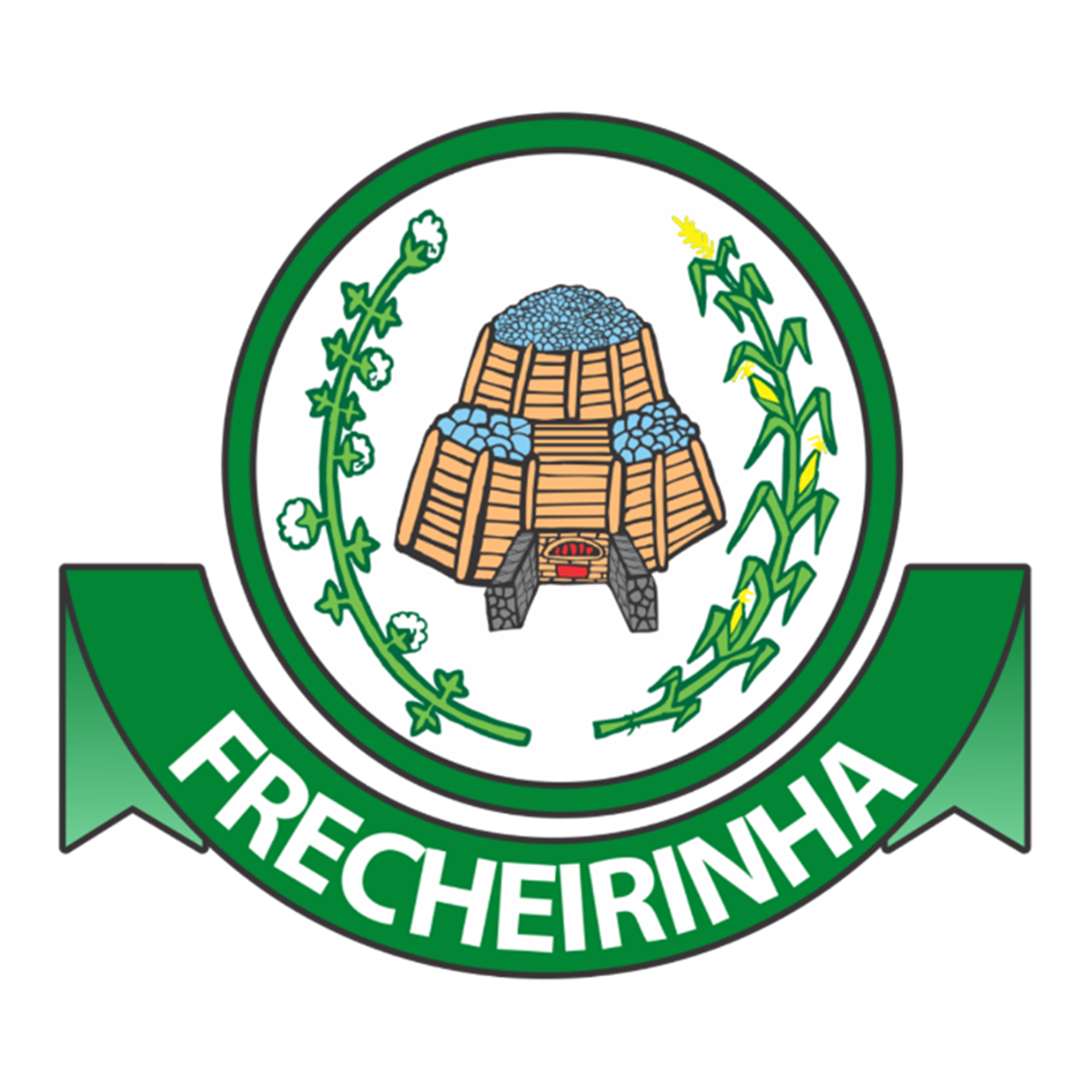
- Flag Coat of arms
- Interactive map of Frecheirinha
- Country: Brazil
- Region: Nordeste
- State: Ceará
- Mesoregion: Noroeste Cearense

Population (2020)
  - Total: 14,134
- Time zone: UTC−3 (BRT)

Frecheirinha is a municipality in the state of Ceará in the Northeast region of Brazil.

== See also ==
- List of municipalities in Ceará
