= Tarrafas =

Municipality in Ceará, Brazil

- Municipality
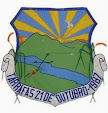
- Coat of arms
- Interactive map of Tarrafas
- Coordinates: 6°41′00″S 39°45′25″W
- Country: Brazil
- Region: Nordeste
- State: Ceará
- Mesoregion: Centro-Sul Cearense

Population (2020)
  - Total: 8,573
- Time zone: UTC−3 (BRT)

Tarrafas is a municipality in the state of Ceará in the Northeast region of Brazil.

== See also ==
- List of municipalities in Ceará
