= Ararendá =

Municipality in Ceará, Brazil

Coordinates: 4°45′S 40°50′W

- Municipality
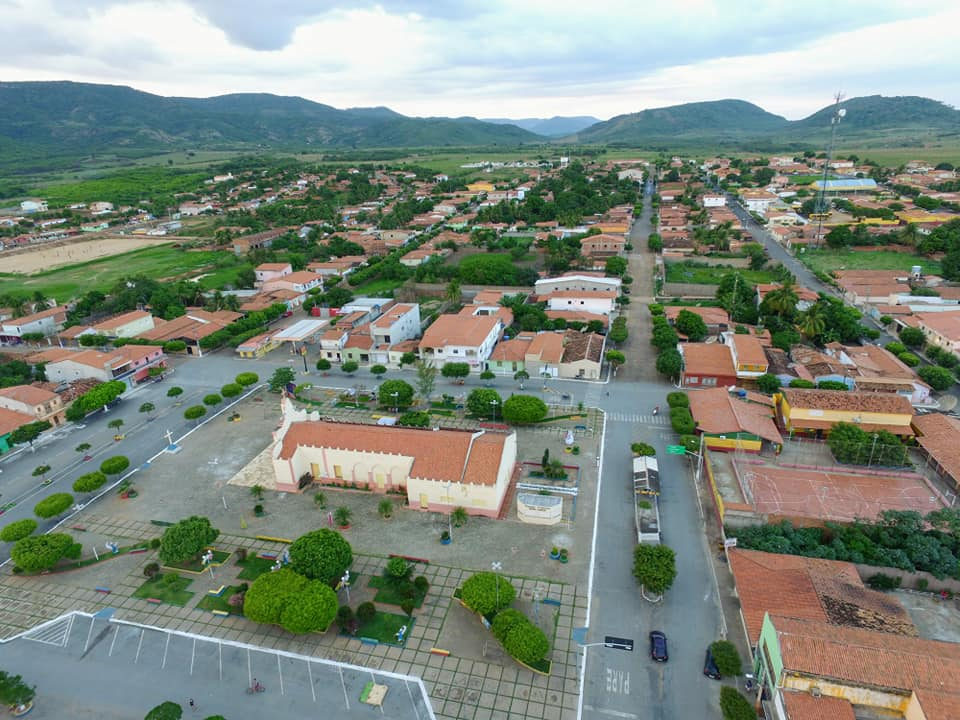
- View of Ararendá

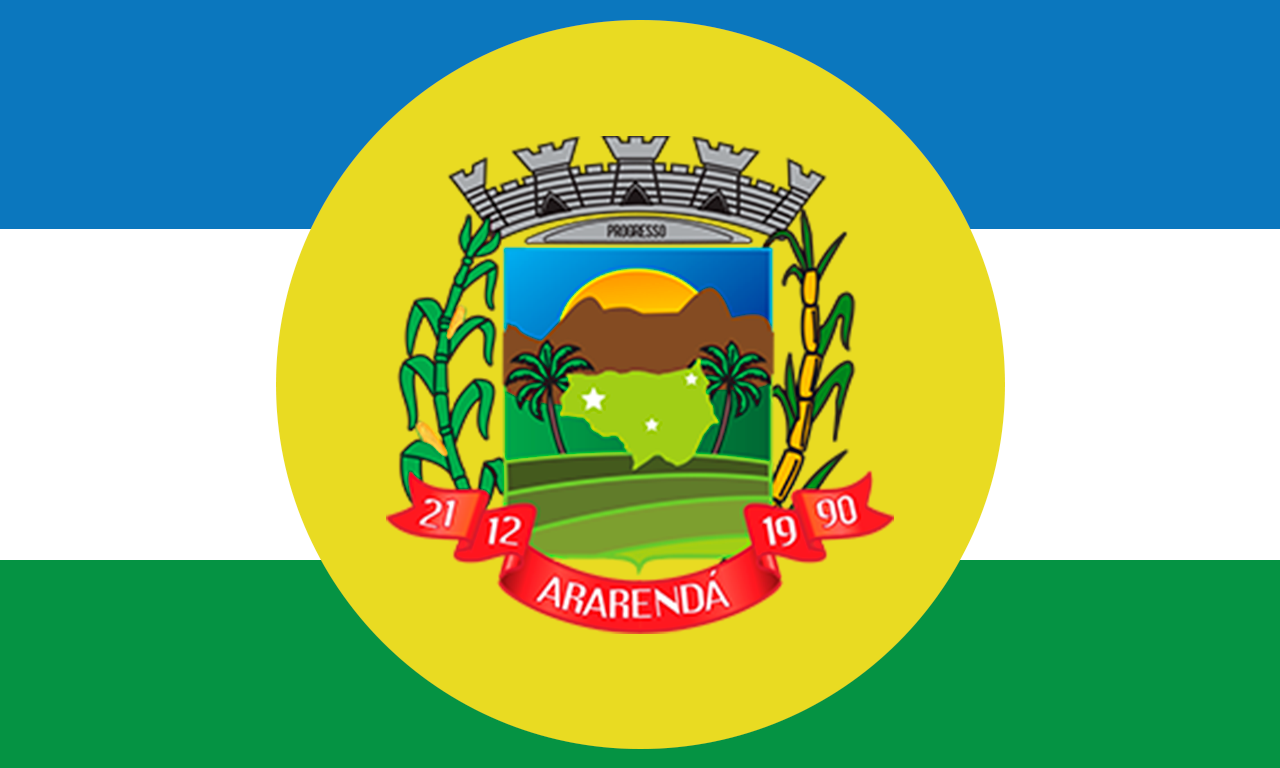
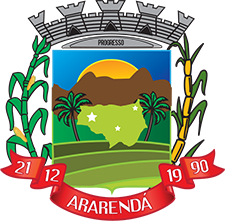
- Flag Coat of arms
- Interactive map of Ararendá
- Country: Brazil
- Region: Nordeste
- State: Ceará
- Mesoregion: Sertoes Cearenses

Population (2020)
  - Total: 10,959
- Time zone: UTC−3 (BRT)

Ararendá is a municipality in the state of Ceará in the Northeast region of Brazil. As of 2020, the estimated municipality population is 10,959 people.

== See also ==
- List of municipalities in Ceará
