= Varjota =

Municipality in Ceará, Brazil

Coordinates: 4.19389°S 40.4769°W

- Municipality
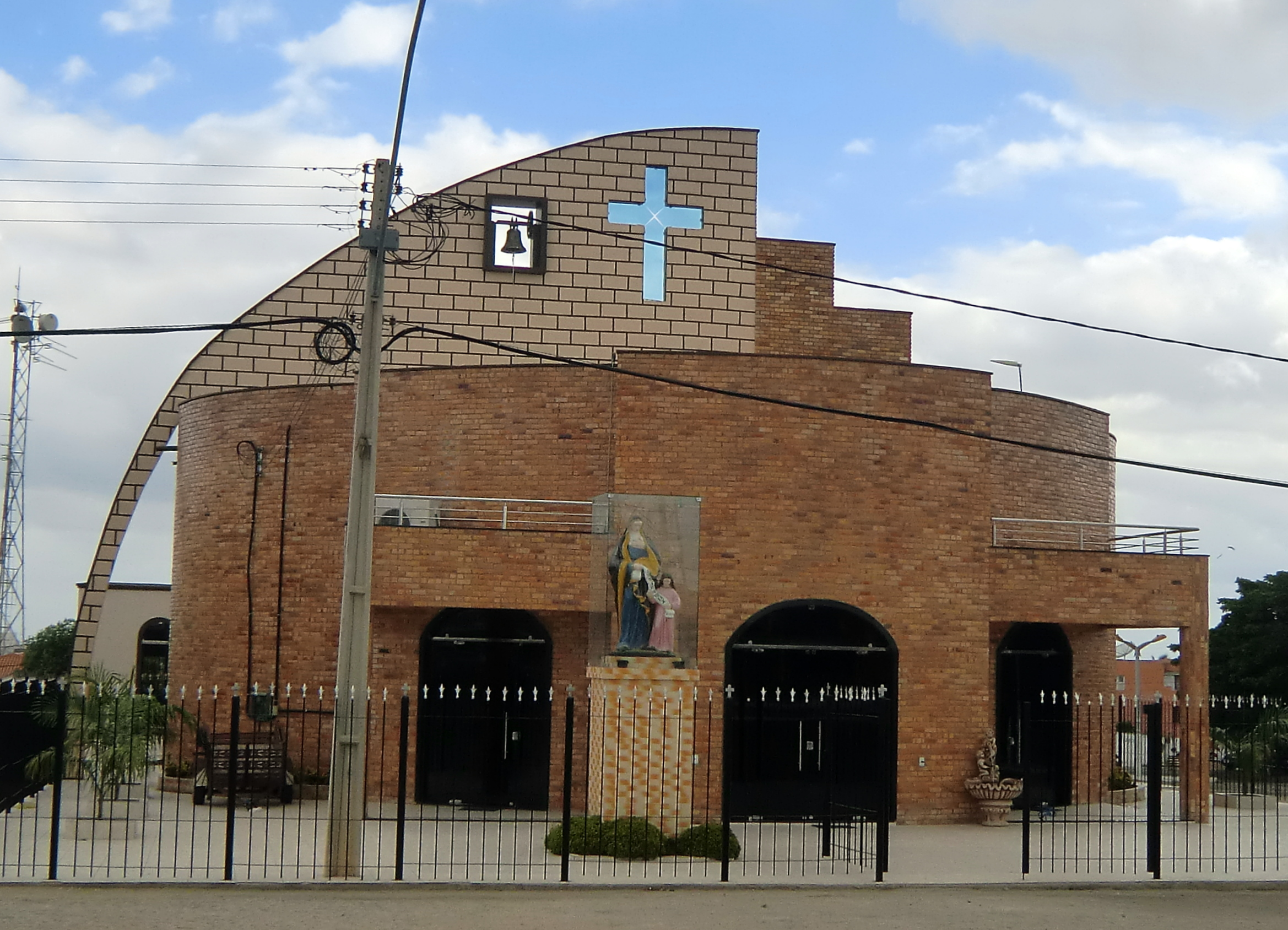
- Mother Church of Varjota-CE, Panoramio

- Flag Coat of arms
- Interactive map of Varjota
- Country: Brazil
- Region: Nordeste
- State: Ceará
- Mesoregion: Noroeste Cearense

Population (2020)
  - Total: 18,471
- Time zone: UTC−3 (BRT)

Varjota is a municipality in the state of Ceará in the Northeast region of Brazil.

== See also ==
- List of municipalities in Ceará
