= Ipaumirim =

Municipality in Ceará, Brazil

Coordinates: 6°47′S 38°43′W

- Municipality
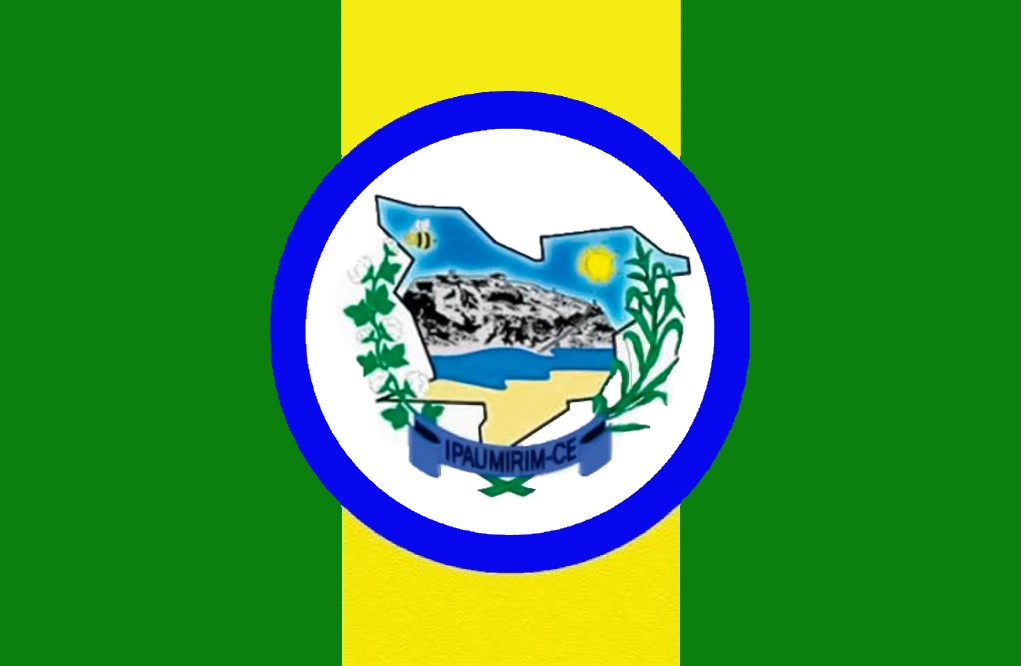
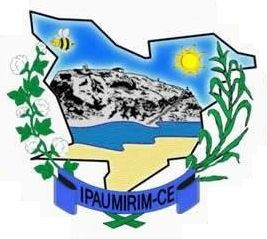
- Flag Coat of arms
- Interactive map of Ipaumirim
- Country: Brazil
- Region: Nordeste
- State: Ceará
- Mesoregion: Centro-Sul Cearense

Population (2020)
  - Total: 12,485
- Time zone: UTC−3 (BRT)

Ipaumirim is a municipality in the state of Ceará in the Northeast region of Brazil.

== See also ==
- List of municipalities in Ceará
