= Mucambo =

Municipality in Ceará, Brazil

Coordinates: 3°54′32″S 40°44′49″W

Mucambo Mucambo
- Municipality
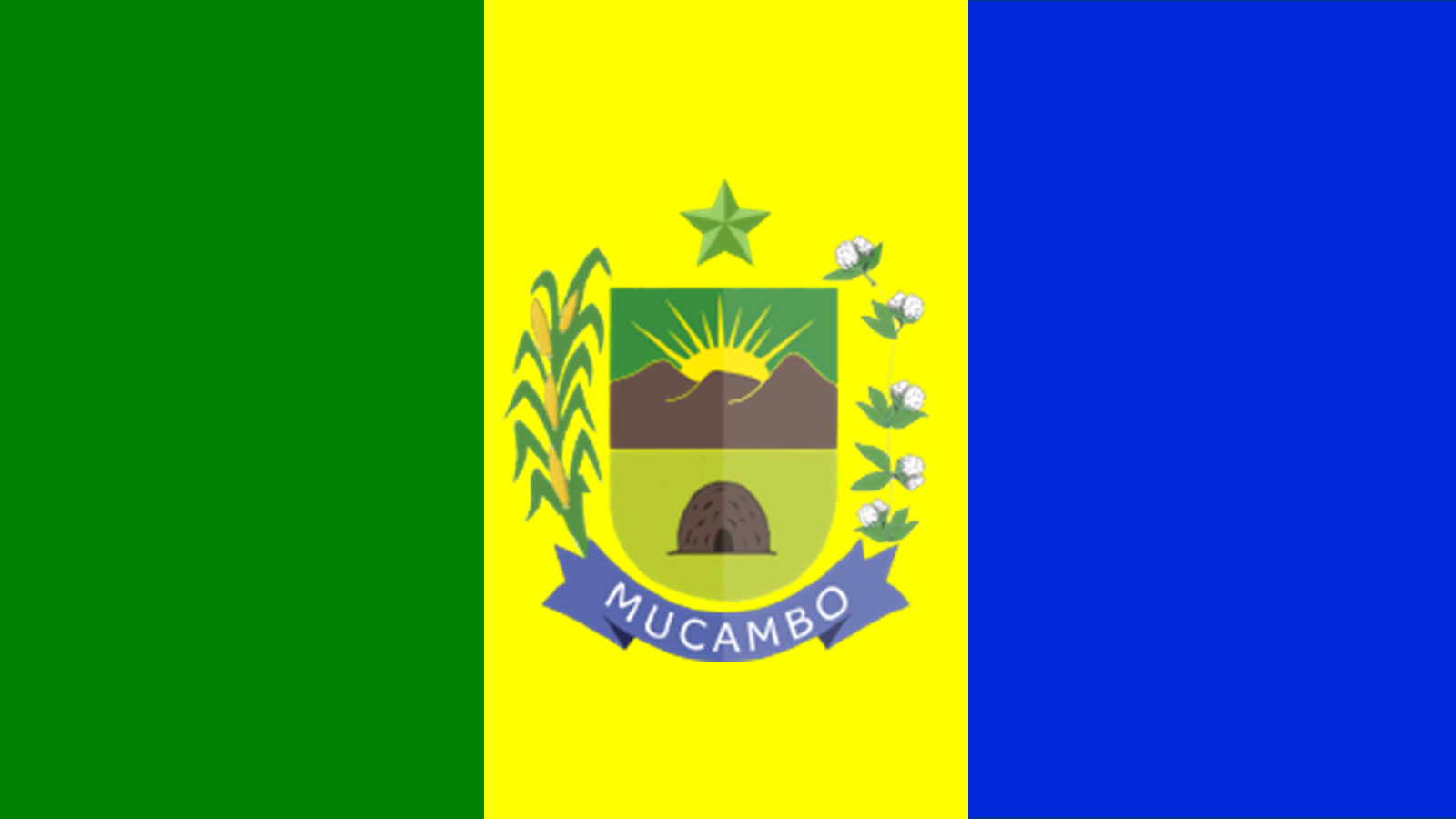
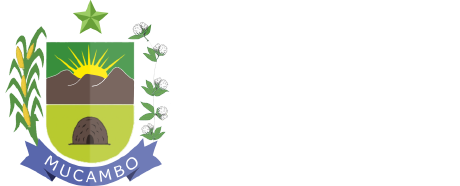
- Flag Coat of arms

- Coordinates: 3° 54' 32" S 40° 44' 49" O
- Country: Brazil
- Region: Nordeste
- State: Ceará
- Mesoregion: Northwest Ceará
- Mayor: Francisco das Chagas Parente Aguiar

Government
  - Type: Democracy

Area
  - Total: 74,200 sq mi (192,190 km^{2})
- Elevation: 560 ft (170 m)

Population (2021)
  - Total: 14,561
  - Density: 196/sq mi (75.8/km^{2})
- Time zone: UTC−3 (BRT)

Mucambo is a municipality in the state of Ceará in the Northeast region of Brazil.

== See also ==
- List of municipalities in Ceará
