= Catunda =

Municipality in Ceará, Brazil

Coordinates: 4°32′S 40°12′W

- Municipality
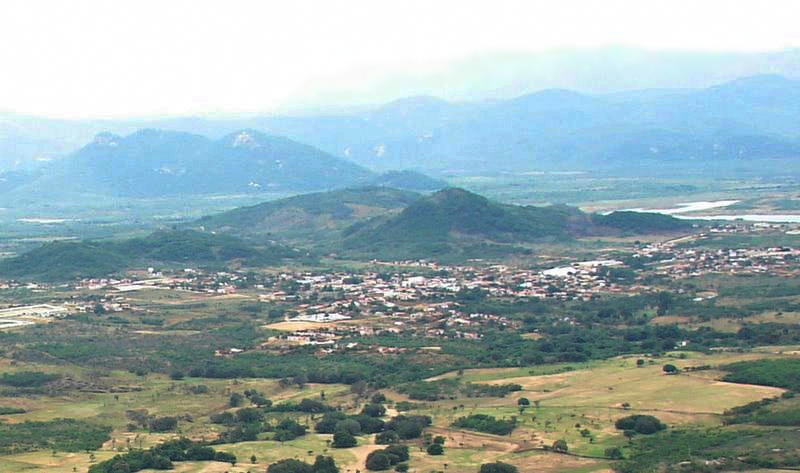

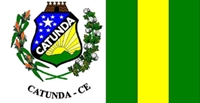
- Flag Coat of arms
- Interactive map of Catunda
- Country: Brazil
- Region: Nordeste
- State: Ceará
- Mesoregion: Noroeste Cearense

Population (2020)
  - Total: 10,376
- Time zone: UTC−3 (BRT)

Catunda is a municipality in the state of Ceará in the Northeast region of Brazil.

== See also ==
- List of municipalities in Ceará
