= Milhã =

Municipality in Ceará, Brazil

Coordinates: 5.675°S 39.1939°W

- Municipality
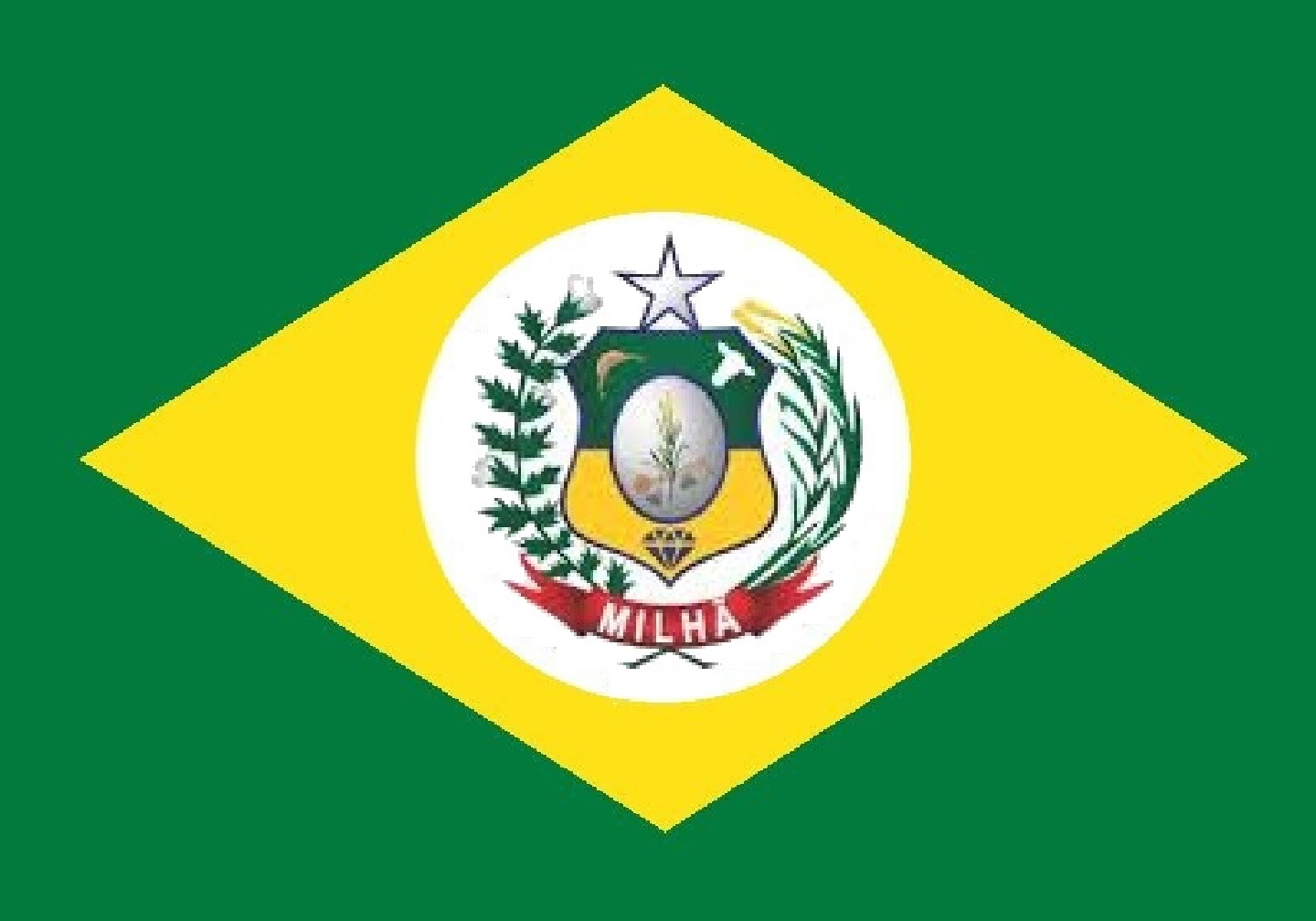
- Flag
- Interactive map of Milhã
- Country: Brazil
- Region: Nordeste
- State: Ceará
- Mesoregion: Sertoes Cearenses

Population (2020)
  - Total: 13,142
- Time zone: UTC−3 (BRT)

Milhã is a municipality in the state of Ceará in the Northeast region of Brazil.

== See also ==
- List of municipalities in Ceará
