= Barro, Ceará =

Municipality in Ceará, Brazil

Coordinates: 7°10′37″S 38°46′55″W

Barro
- Municipality
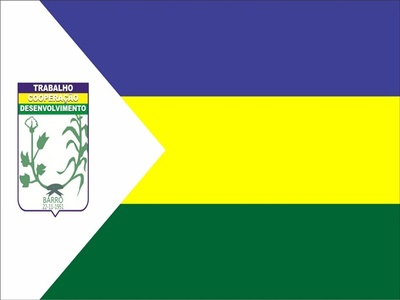
- Flag
- Interactive map of Barro
- Country: Brazil
- Region: Nordeste
- State: Ceará
- Mesoregion: Sul Cearense

Population (2020)
  - Total: 22,758
- Time zone: UTC−3 (BRT)

Barro, Ceará is a municipality in the state of Ceará in the Northeast region of Brazil.

== See also ==
- List of municipalities in Ceará
