= Palhano =

Municipality in Ceará, Brazil

Coordinates: 4.745°S 37.9589°W

- Municipality
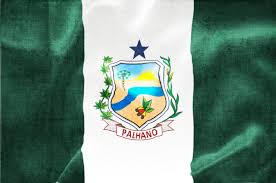
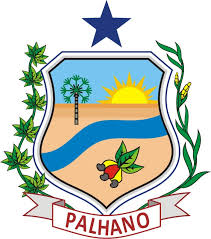
- Flag Coat of arms
- Interactive map of Palhano
- Country: Brazil
- Region: Nordeste
- State: Ceará
- Mesoregion: Jaguaribe

Population (2020)
  - Total: 9,422
- Time zone: UTC−3 (BRT)

Palhano is a municipality in the state of Ceará in the Northeast region of Brazil.

== See also ==
- List of municipalities in Ceará
