= Carnaubal =

Municipality in Ceará, Brazil

Coordinates: 4°10′01″S 40°56′34″W

- Municipality
- Flag Coat of arms
- Interactive map of Carnaubal
- Country: Brazil
- Region: Nordeste
- State: Ceará
- Mesoregion: Noroeste Cearense

Population (2020)
  - Total: 17,685
- Time zone: UTC−3 (BRT)

Carnaubal is a municipality in the state of Ceará in the Northeast region of Brazil.

== See also ==
- List of municipalities in Ceará
