= Itapiúna =

Municipality in Ceará, Brazil

Coordinates: 4°33′S 38°57′W

- Municipality
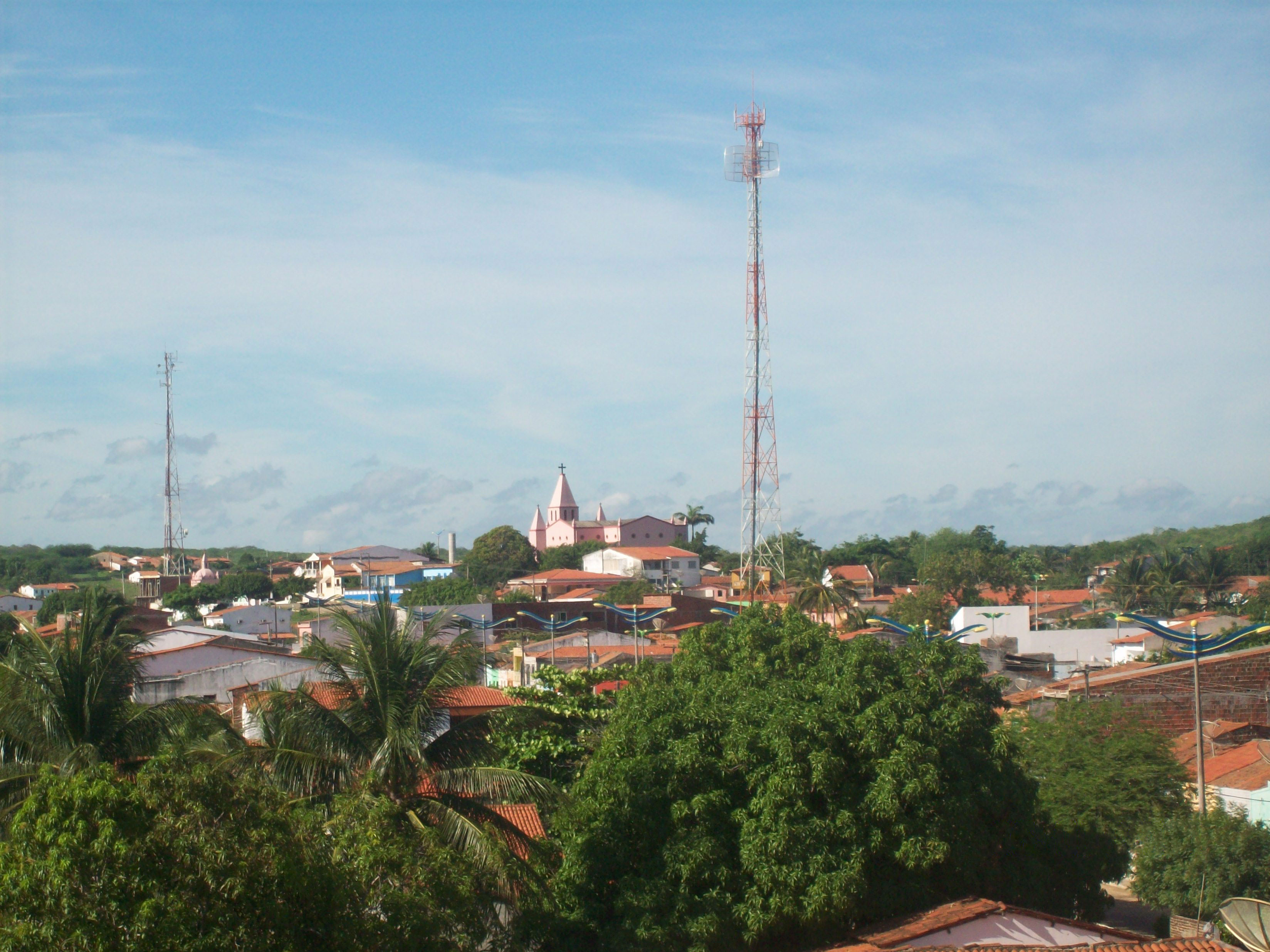
- View of Itapiúna

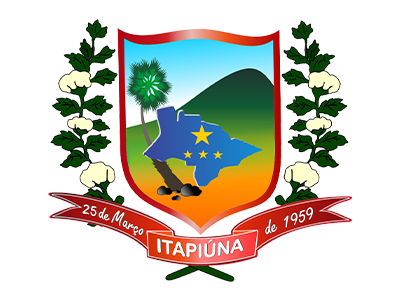
- Coat of arms
- Interactive map of Itapiúna
- Country: Brazil
- Region: Nordeste
- State: Ceará
- Mesoregion: Noroeste Cearense

Population (2020)
  - Total: 20,520
- Time zone: UTC−3 (BRT)

Itapiúna is a municipality in the state of Ceará in the Northeast region of Brazil.

== See also ==
- List of municipalities in Ceará
