= Granjeiro =

Municipality in Ceará, Brazil

Coordinates: 6°53′S 39°12′W

- Municipality
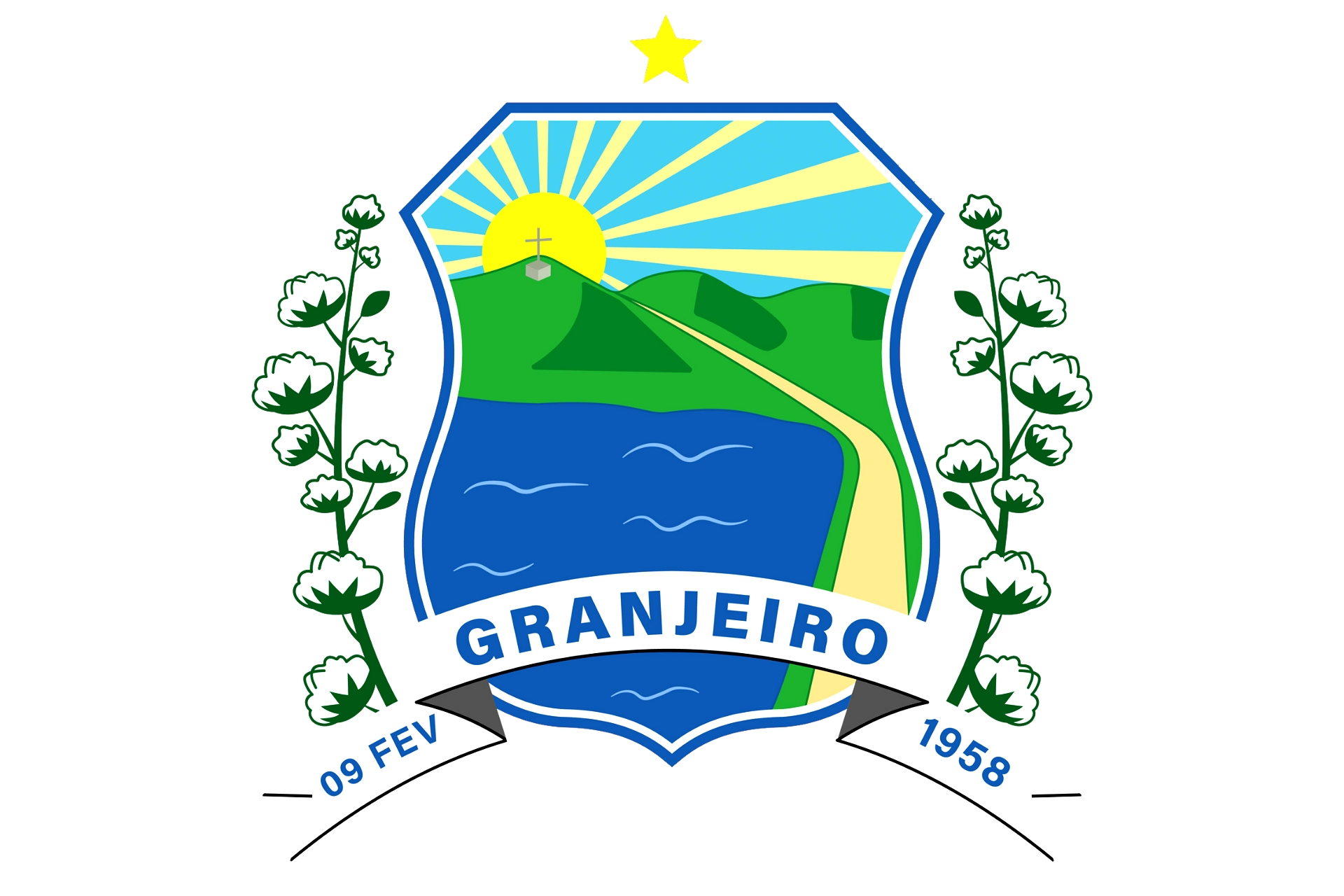
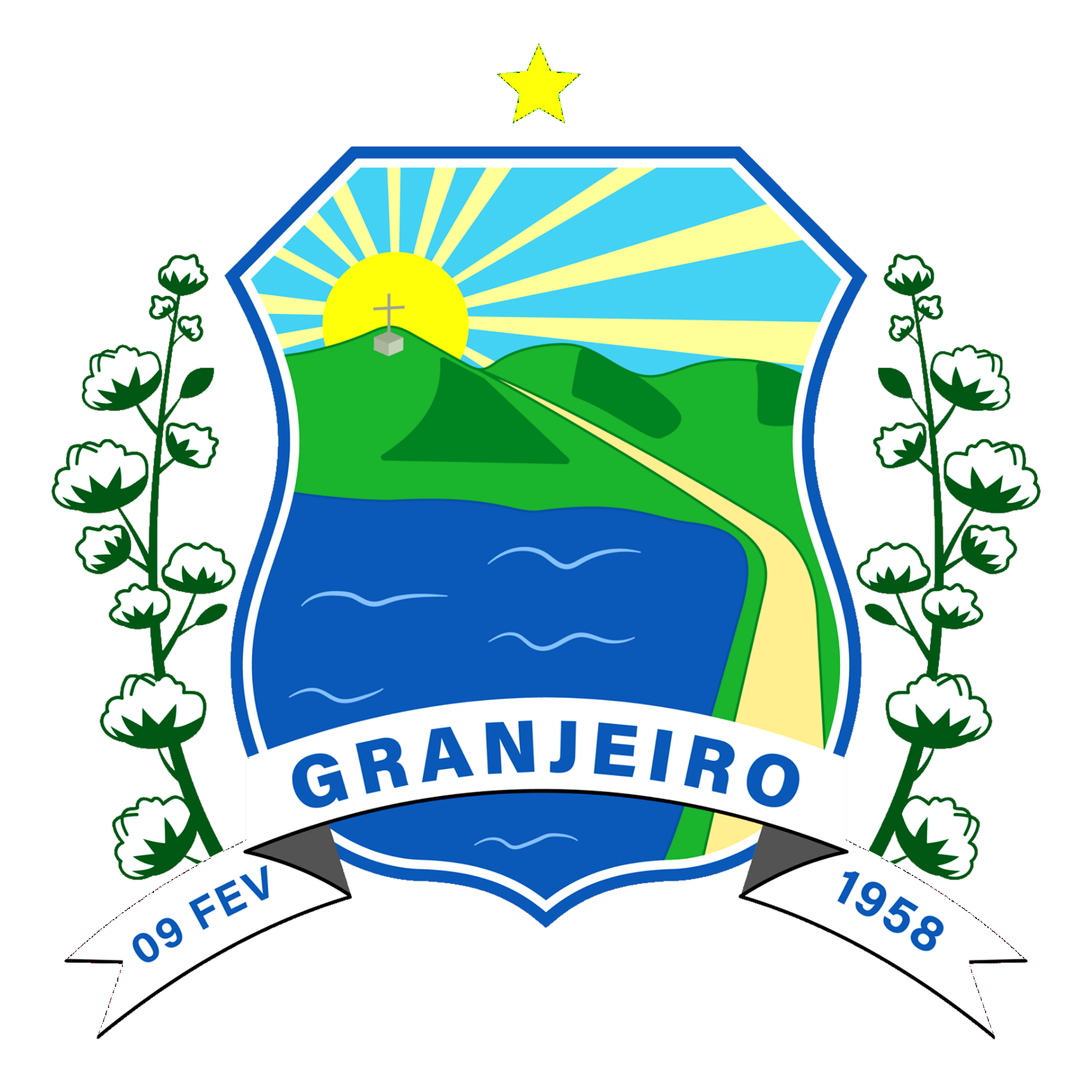
- Flag Coat of arms
- Interactive map of Granjeiro
- Country: Brazil
- Region: Nordeste
- State: Ceará
- Mesoregion: Sul Cearense

Population (2020)
  - Total: 4,814
- Time zone: UTC−3 (BRT)

Granjeiro is a municipality in the state of Ceará in the Northeast region of Brazil.

== See also ==
- List of municipalities in Ceará
