= Pacujá =

Municipality in Ceará, Brazil

Coordinates: 3.98778°S 40.6969°W

- Municipality
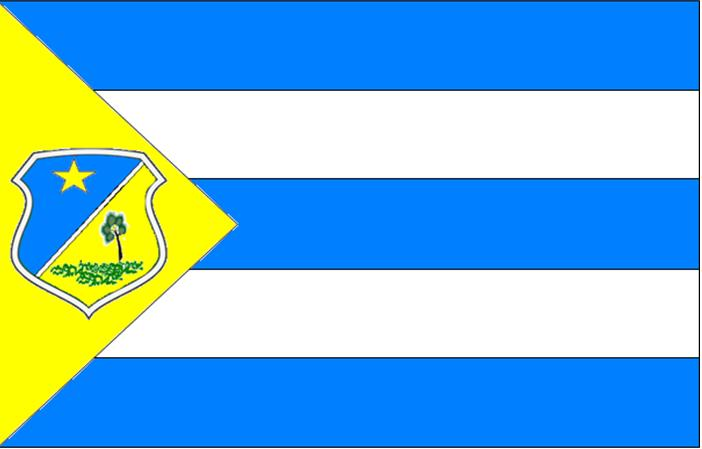
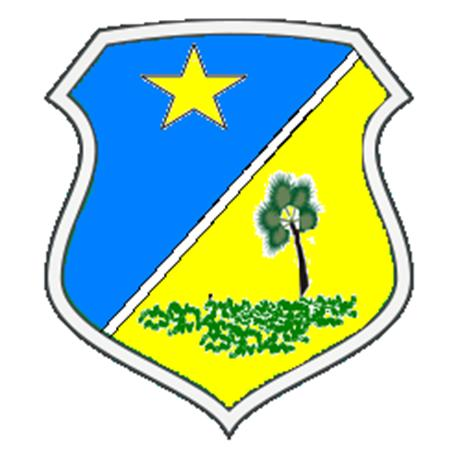
- Flag Coat of arms
- Interactive map of Pacujá
- Country: Brazil
- Region: Nordeste
- State: Ceará
- Mesoregion: Noroeste Cearense
- Prefeita: Maria Célia

Population (2020)
  - Total: 6,549
- Time zone: UTC−3 (BRT)

Pacujá is a municipality in the state of Ceará in the Northeast region of Brazil.

== See also ==
- List of municipalities in Ceará
