= Santana do Acaraú =

Municipality in Ceará, Brazil

Coordinates: 3°27′S 40°12′W

- Municipality
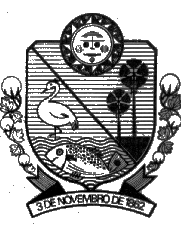
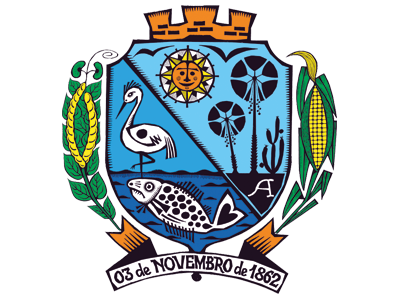
- Flag Seal Coat of arms
- Interactive map of Santana do Acaraú
- Country: Brazil
- Region: Nordeste
- State: Ceará
- Mesoregion: Noroeste Cearense

Population (2020)
  - Total: 32,654
- Time zone: UTC−3 (BRT)

Santana do Acaraú is a municipality in the state of Ceará in the Northeast region of Brazil.

== See also ==
- List of municipalities in Ceará
