= Potiretama =

Municipality in Ceará, Brazil

Coordinates: 5°43′S 38°09′W

- Municipality
- Interactive map of Potiretama
- Country: Brazil
- Region: Nordeste
- State: Ceará
- Mesoregion: Jaguaribe

Population (2020)
  - Total: 6,437
- Time zone: UTC−3 (BRT)

Potiretama is a municipality in the state of Ceará in the Northeast region of Brazil.

== See also ==
- List of municipalities in Ceará
