= Baixio =

Municipality in Ceará, Brazil

Coordinates: 6.73°S 38.7169°W

- Municipality
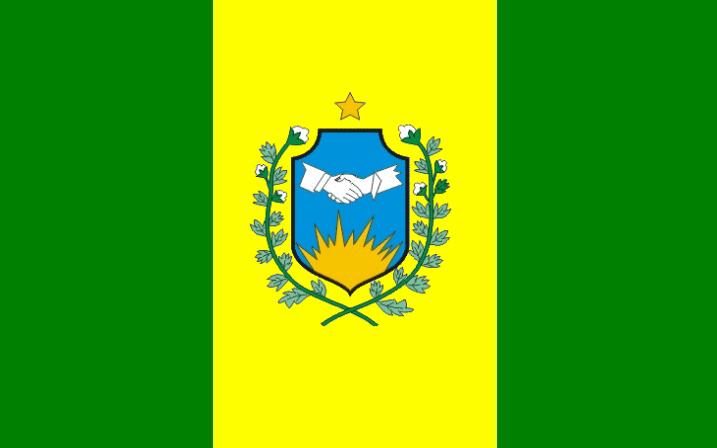
- Flag
- Interactive map of Baixio
- Country: Brazil
- Region: Nordeste
- State: Ceará
- Mesoregion: Centro-Sul Cearense

Population (2020)
  - Total: 6,303
- Time zone: UTC−3 (BRT)

Baixio is a municipality in the state of Ceará in the Northeast region of Brazil.

== See also ==
- List of municipalities in Ceará
