= Alcântaras =

Municipality in Ceará, Brazil

- Municipality
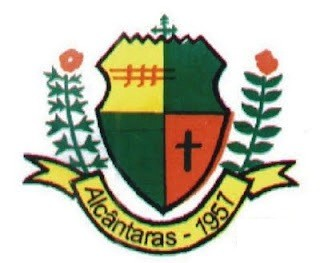
- Flag Coat of arms

- Municipality of Alcântaras, Brazil
- Coordinates: 03°35′20″S 40°32′45″W
- Country: Brazil
- Region: Nordeste
- State: Ceará
- Mesoregion: Noroeste Cearense

Population (2020)
  - Total: 11,781
- Time zone: UTC−3 (BRT)

Alcântaras is a municipality in the state of Ceará in the Northeast region of Brazil.

== History of Alcantaras ==
Alcântaras, before its political emancipation, was called Sítio São José, in honor of the husband of Jesus' mother, Mary. The municipality was once part of the territory of Meruoca, a city older than other larger cities. Serra da Meruoca was inhabited by natives, aborigines of this land called Ceará by Europeans. The first contact between Rerius indigenous people and Catholic missionaries sent by the Church was on the side of the mountain where the municipality of Alcântaras is currently located. The first Europeans who arrived in Serra da Meruoca suffered a lot; In addition to the tropical climate, they had to endure mosquitoes (muriçoca), giant flies and other living beings, many of which were venomous. There were fruits in the mountains that did not exist in Europe and also indigenous food and products that entered the menu of European settlers. According to a well-known historian in Sobral, several of these colonizers were actually Jews who fled persecution on the European Continent. They converted to Catholicism, but their hearts were still focused only on Yahweh, the God of the Hebrews. João Capistrano, a descendant of Portuguese, stayed in the Serra da Meruoca and took possession of the lands on the west side of the mountain. Because the Alcântara family was so prosperous, the new municipality was named in honor of the Alcântara family* (Alcântaras). Other descendants of Lusitanians and Spaniards settled in other parts of the mountains. The traits of African culture also echo in the soul of the people, such as the preference for colorful clothes, the rhythm of drums, and the easy smile on their faces. In the mountains, due to the good climate conditions, there is a greater presence of rain due to its altitude, resulting in deep soil, providing conditions for the existence of dense forests. In his excellent article “ The Omnipresence of the Alcantara Culture”, the author explains that the deep soil favored the intense practice of agricultural activities in the municipality, with slave labor as the labor force, giving rise to sugarcane fields, farms, cotton plantations, flour mills and stills. The Algodões site, with its old mansions, one of the few still standing, record this time full of contradictions: where there was an abundance of food, slave labor was present; men and women were reduced to mere objects of labor. Faced with the sub-human conditions, the captives fled to distant places, preferably where there was a water source, and small quilombos were formed in these places, as is the case of Sítio Picos, Sítio São Bernardo and Sítio Benedito. Another very present feature are the clay ceramics molded by hand and the making of baskets made of vines, a kind of fusion of indigenous culture with African culture, giving rise to the immaterial culture of Sítio São Bernardo. Joseph of the Alcantaras.

The territory of Alcântaras, originally called Sítio São José, has as the first owners of these plots the Portuguese José de Araújo Costa, from the parish of Santa Lucrécia de Louro, and his wife, from Pernambuco Brites de Vasconcelos, born in 1724, in Igaraçu, Pernambuco; daughter of Captain Manoel Vaz Carrasco and Madalena de Sá. Regarding the origin of Sítio São José, on pages 62 and 63 of the book [ 8 ] the author explains “that the first residents of these plots arrived in 1757”, therefore, 33 years after the first white couple to take up residence in Serra da Meruoca, the couple Cel. Sebastião de Sá and his wife Cosma Ribeiro Franca; who in 1724 took possession of the land they received in sesmaria, measuring two and a half leagues on the banks of the Itacaranha stream.

The first name for the land where the city of Alcântaras is now built was São José and later São José dos Alcântaras. The name São José is mentioned in old documents from the 18th century

== Culture ==
Quadrilha Junina (Festival de Quadrilhas Juninas de Alcântaras): Hundreds of large groups of traditional folke dances that organize to make presentations, usually to the sound of Forró, during the festas juninas, in the month of June (and also July).

Cuisine: Brazilian cuisine includes feijoada. There are some dishes which are typical of the northeast of Brazil, as macaxera, tapioca, carne do sol, but the typical food of Ceará is Baião de Dois.

Religion: The dominant Religion of Alcântaras is Roman Catholicism due to the influence Portuguese.

== Climate ==
Alcântaras has a typical tropical climate. The climate of Alcântaras is hot almost all year. The temperature in the municipality varies from 18 to 36 °C (64 to 97 °F)

== Government ==
- Eliesio Fonteles
- Joaquim Carvalho

== Notable people ==
Caetano Ximenes de Aragão, doctor and writer (February 24, 1927 - June 14, 1995).

== Access ==
One road give access to the city: CE-241.

== Schools ==
There are five schools on the city.

- Escola Gregório Cunha Freire
- Escola José P. Barroso
- Escola Inocência Alcântara Freire
- Escola Estadual Francisco de Almeida Monte
- Escola Maria Raulino

== Media ==
The city has one radio station, Rádio Bela Vista FM.
