= Tejuçuoca =

Municipality in Ceará, Brazil

- Municipality
- Flag Coat of arms

- Location in Ceará state

- Location in Brazil
- Coordinates: 4°01′S 39°31′W
- Country: Brazil
- Region: Northeast
- State: Ceará

Area
  - Total: 750.6 km^{2} (289.8 sq mi)

Population (2020)
  - Total: 19,371
  - Density: 25.81/km^{2} (66.84/sq mi)
- Time zone: UTC−3 (BRT)

Tejuçuoca is a municipal of the state of Ceará (CE), located in the northeast of Brazil.

- population: 19,371 (2020)
- Area: 750.605 km²
