= Choró =

Municipality in Ceará, Brazil

- Municipality
- The Municipality of Choró
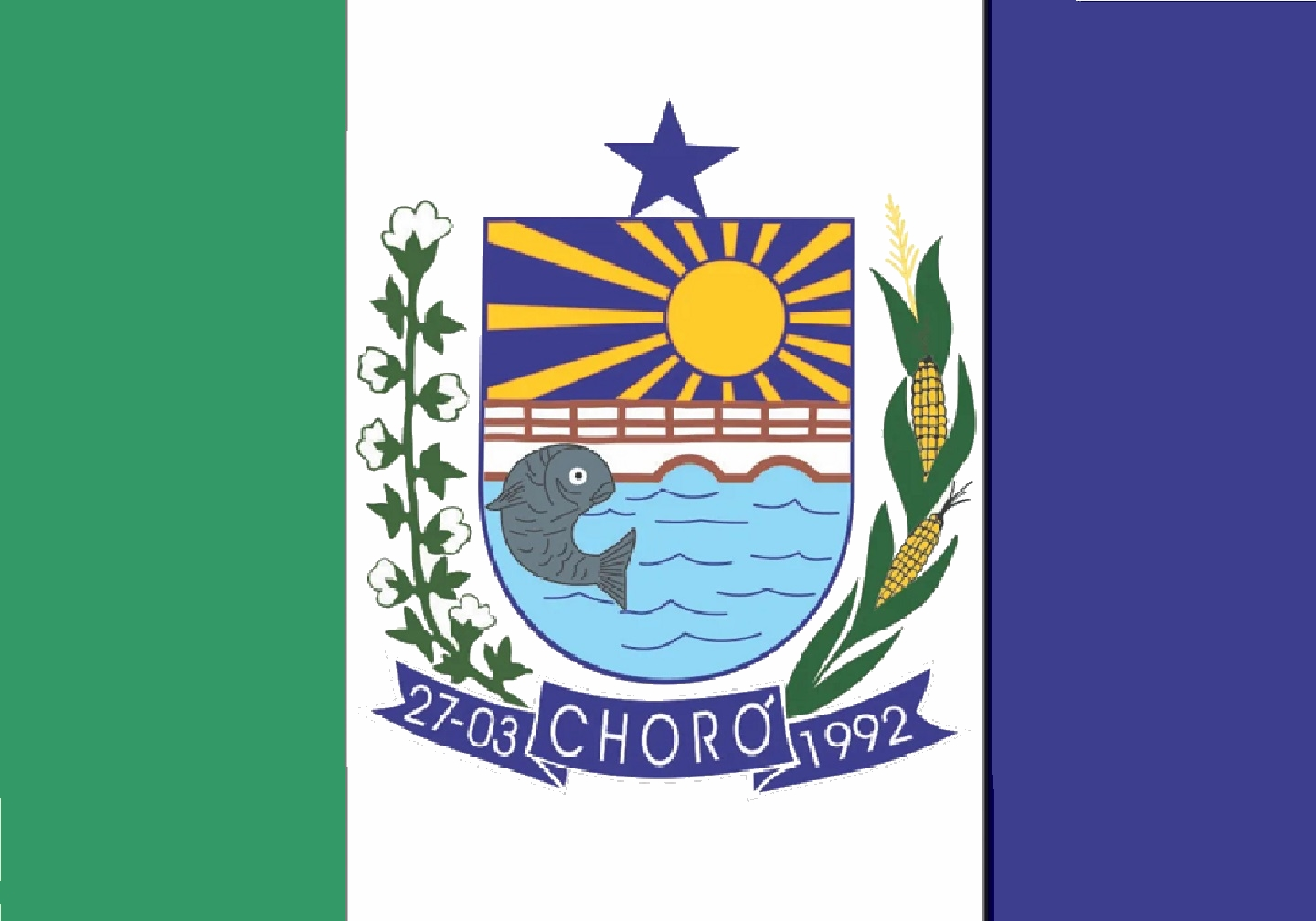
- Flag
- Nickname: Choró Limão
- Location in the State of Ceará

- Coordinates: 04°50′36″S 39°08′28″W
- Country: Brazil
- Region: Northeast
- State: Ceará
- Founded: March 27, 1992

Government
  - Mayor: Jose Antonio Rodrigues Mendes (Dé)(PSDB)

Area
  - Total: 815.759 km^{2} (314.966 sq mi)
- Elevation: 243 m (797 ft)

Population (2020)
  - Total: 13,565
  - Density: 15.8/km^{2} (41/sq mi)
- Time zone: UTC−3 (BRT)
- HDI (2000): 0.561 – medium

Choró is a municipality located in the Brazilian state of Ceara. It is at an altitude of 243m, located on 04°50′36″S 39°08′28″W. Its population was 13,565 (2020). The municipality has a surface area of approximately 792,7 km².

== Neighborhoods ==
List of neighborhoods in Choró:

- Barbada - Farm
- Barreira Branca – Small Farm
- Boa Vista - Farm
- Caicarinha - District
- Centro - Seat
- Feijão - Settlement
- Maravilha - District
- Monte Castelo - District
- Olho D'agua – Small Farm
- Piemonte - Settlement
- Poço do Barro - Farm
- Santa Rita - Village
- São João - Settlement
- São José- Farm
- São Mateus – Small Farm
- Serra da Palha
- Serra do Teixeira
- Teodosio - Farm
