= Gruta de Ubajara =

Cave

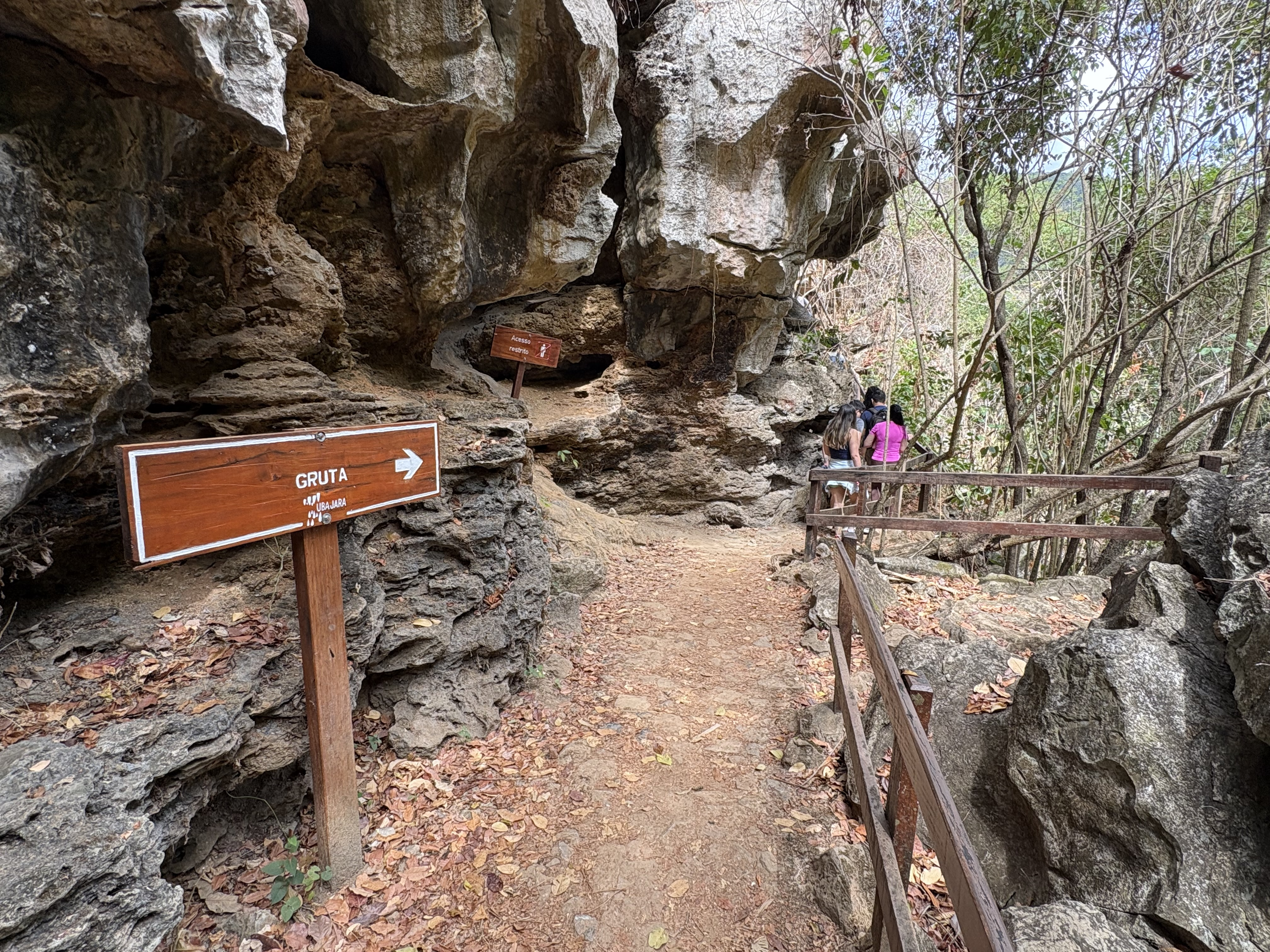

- Location within Brazil
- Location: Ubajara National Park, city of Ubajara, Serra de Ibiapaba, Ceará state
- Coordinates: 3°50′33″S 40°54′2″W
- Depth: 75 m (246.06 ft)
- Length: 1,120 m (3,674.54 ft)
- Discovery: early 18th century
- Geology: limestone cavity
- Access: yes
- Show cave opened: 420 m (1,377.95 ft)
- Show cave length: 420 m (1,377.95 ft)
- Lighting: yes

Gruta de Ubajara (English: Ubajara Grotto) is a limestone cave, located within the Ubajara National Park, near the city of Ubajara, in the foothills of the Serra de Ibiapaba, Ceará, Brazil. Its sequence of nine halls has a length of 1,120 m (3,674.54 ft), of which 420 m (1,377.95 ft) are lit trails. The site can be accessed either via a cable car which descends over a 535 m (1,755.25 ft) deep depression, or on foot along the 4 km (2.49 mi) long Cafundós trail.

== History ==
The Ubajara grotto is known since the early eighteenth century, when Portuguese colonists conducted expeditions in the region in search of minerals, especially silver, although without achieving much success. There are other caves known, but they are not open to visitors. Among them stands out the Gruta do Urso Fóssil, of great paleontological importance, the Gruta do Morcego Branco, Gruta de Cima and Gruta do Pendurado.

Ubajara is a term of indigenous origin and the prevailing translation for the name is "Lord of the Canoe." The name would have appeared from the legend of a tribe chief who, having arrived from the coast, inhabited the cave for many years. There are other translations for the name as "Lord of the arrows". Some people also believe that the origin of cave is due to excavations in search of silver, combined with almost two hundred years of climate change.

== See also ==
- List of caves in Brazil
