= Serra da Ibiapaba =

Coordinates: 3°40′S 41°00′W

The Serra de Ibiapaba (Ibiapaba mountains) also known as Serra Grande, Chapada da Ibiabapa e Cuesta da Ibiapaba, is an upland in northeastern Brazil, which lies on the boundary of Piauí and Ceará states. The range runs north and south, extending from near the Atlantic coast in the north to connect with the Serra do Araripe, which forms the southern boundary of Ceará. The Poti River bisects the range, and the southern portion, between the Poti and the Serra do Araripe, is also known as the Serra Grande.

An attractive region for natural wealth which was already inhabited by various indigenous groups. People who lived already negotiating several natural products with European peoples, such as the French before them the arrival of the Portuguese. Initially inhabited by tabajaras and tapuias Indians, as the Iracema Indian woman who was bathing in the Bica do Ipú (Spout of Ipu) was fairly portrayed in the Iracema book by José de Alencar.

In the highlands of Ibiabapa are located the towns of Viçosa do Ceará, Tianguá, Ubajara, São Benedito, Guaraciaba do Norte and Ibiapina. The elevation ranges around 700 to 850 meters above sea level. The Ubajara National Park is located on Serra da Ibiapaba.

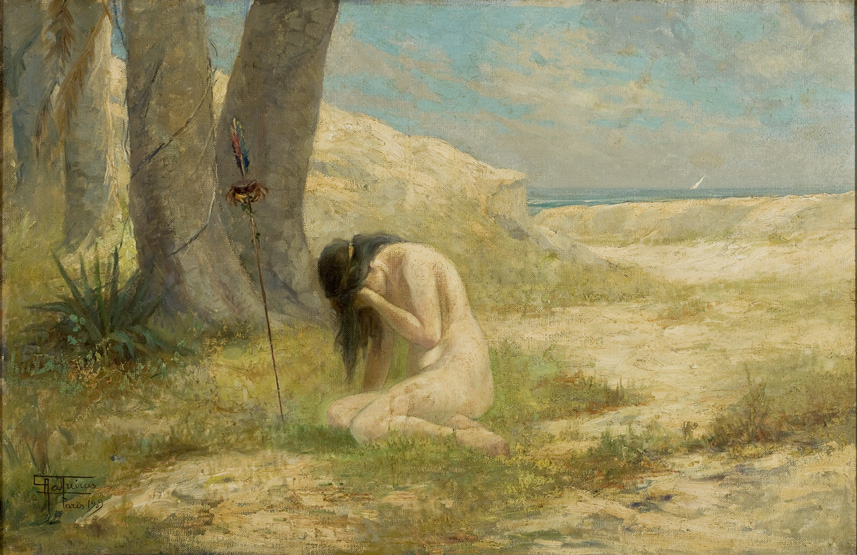
"Iracema", painting by Antônio Parreiras

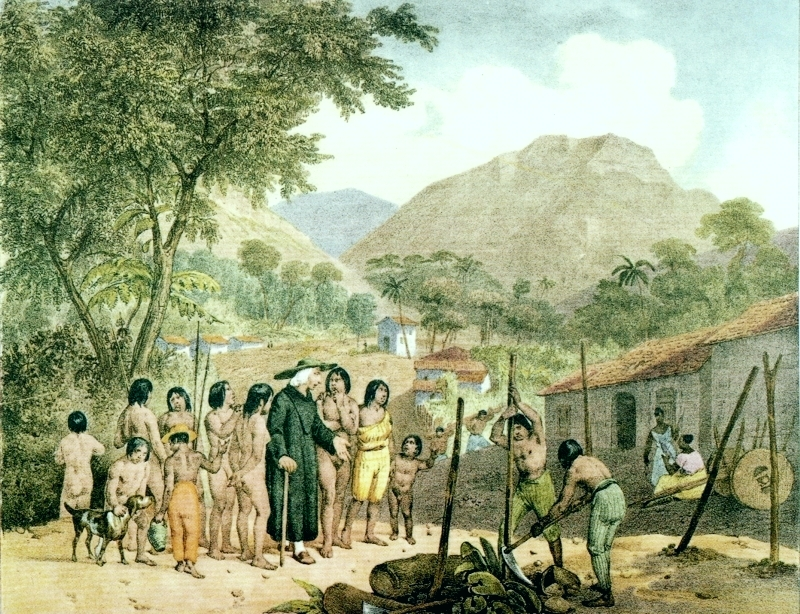
Village of Christianized Tapuyos Indians by Johann Moritz Rugendas

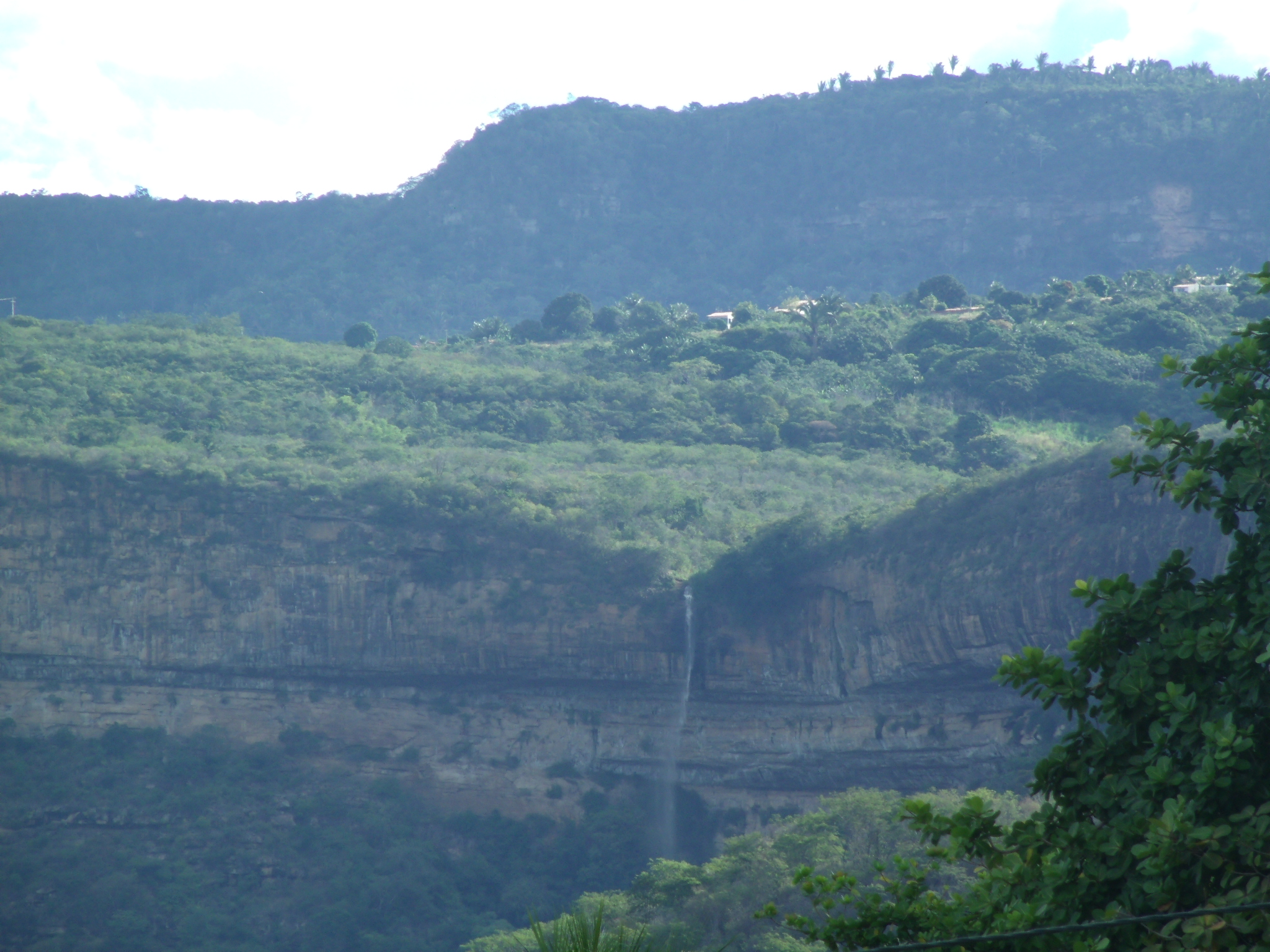
Serra da Ibiapaba (Ibiapaba mountains) and the Bica do Ipú (Spout of Ipu), by Anna Caselli
