= Caatinga moist-forest enclaves =

Ecoregion of Brazil

Caatinga enclaves moist forests
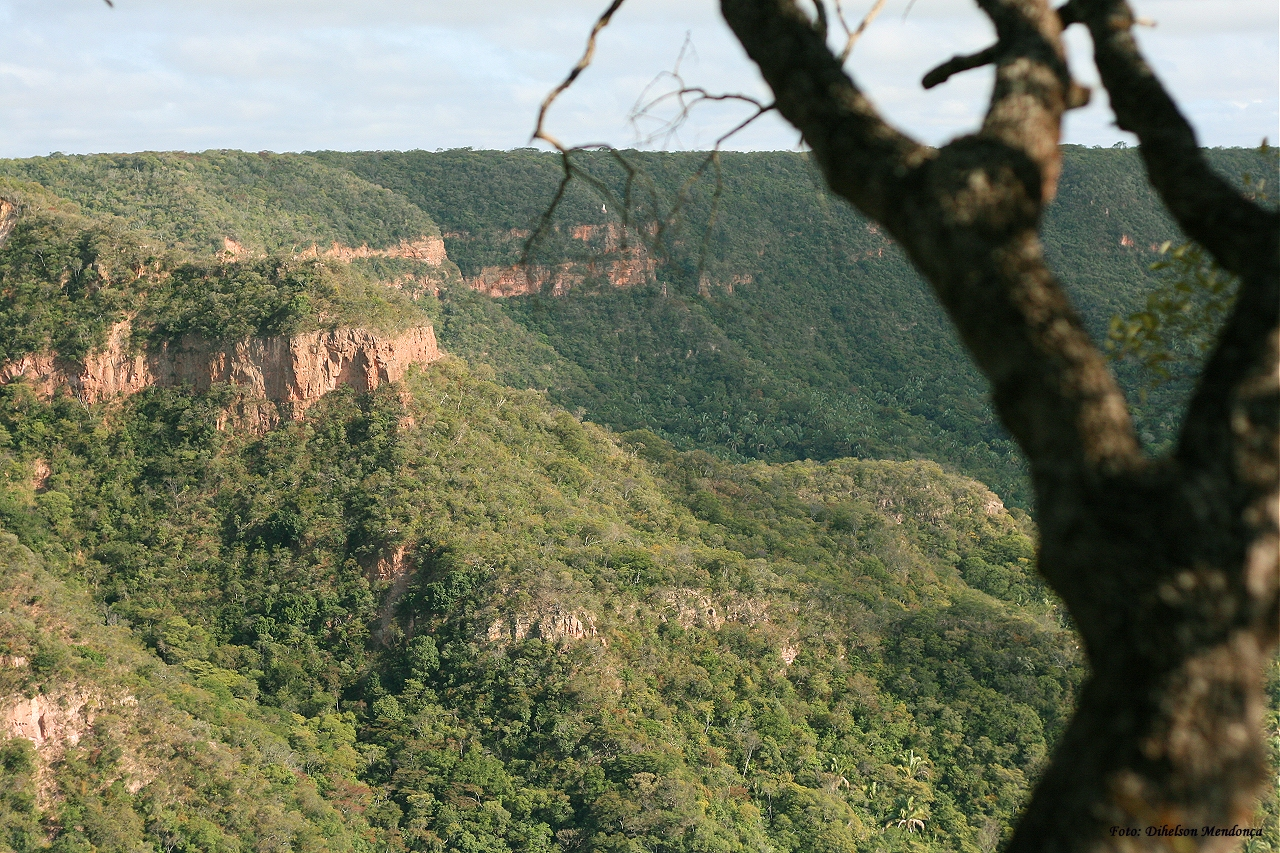
- Caatinga enclave moist forest in Chapada do Araripe, Ceará, Brazil.

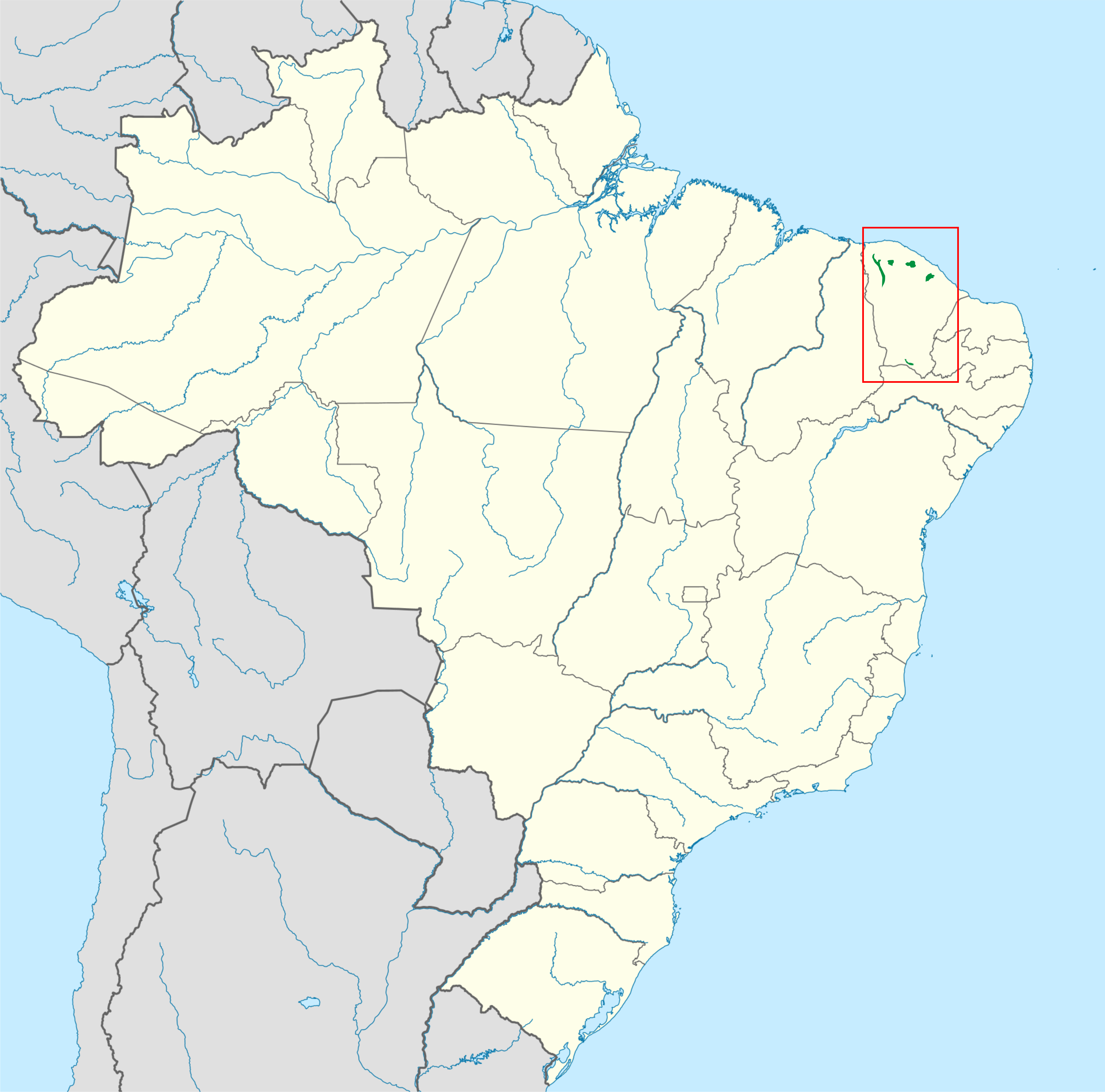
- Caatinga enclaves moist forests ecoregion as defined by WWF.

Ecology
- Biome: Atlantic Forest
- Borders: Caatinga
- Mammal species: 124

Geography
- Area: 4,800 km^{2} (1,900 mi^{2})
- Country: Brazil
- State: Ceará

Conservation
- Habitat loss: 14.9%
- Protected: 6.59%

The Caatinga enclaves moist forests is an ecoregion of the Tropical moist forests Biome, and the South American Atlantic Forest biome. It is located in northeastern Brazil.

The ecoregion forms a series of discontinuous, island-like enclaves amongst the much larger and dry Caatinga xeric shrubland and thorn forests ecoregion.

== Setting ==
The Caatinga enclaves moist forests cover an area of 4,800 km^{2} (1,900 sq mi) in the state of Ceará, in northeastern Brazil. The enclaves are found mostly on four or five major regional plateaus, the Chapada do Araripe, Serra da Meruoca, Serra de Ibiapaba, Serra de Baturité, and Serra da Borborema. The enclaves are found on windward slopes and plateaus between 600 and 800 m (2,000 and 2,600 ft) elevation.

== Flora ==
The main vegetation type is semi-deciduous forests with four strata of vegetation and emergent trees taller than 30 m (98 ft). The forest is generally similar in composition to the primary Atlantic Forests further east, but includes species from the Caatinga, Cerrado, and Amazon rainforest as well.

The emergent and canopy layers are made up mostly of tree species of the families Fabaceae (Peltophorum dubium), Meliaceae (Cedrela fissilis) and Apocynaceae (Aspidosperma parvifolium).

The genus Ameroglossum is endemic to the ecoregion.

== Fauna ==
Fauna associated with this habitat shows a strong connection with both the Amazon rainforest and the Atlantic Forest, and, to a lesser degree, the Caatinga.

Animals associated with this habitat include birds such as the grey-breasted parakeet (Pyrrhura griseipectus), ochraceous piculet (Picumnus limae), Ceará gnateater (Conopophaga lineata cearae) and Araripe manakin (Antilophia bokermanni), frogs such as Adelophryne baturitensis and A. maranguapensis, and lizards such as Mabuya arajara and Leposoma baturitensis.

In contrast to other groups, only a single species of mammal is endemic to these moist forests enclaves, the recently described Cariri climbing mouse (Rhipidomys cariri).

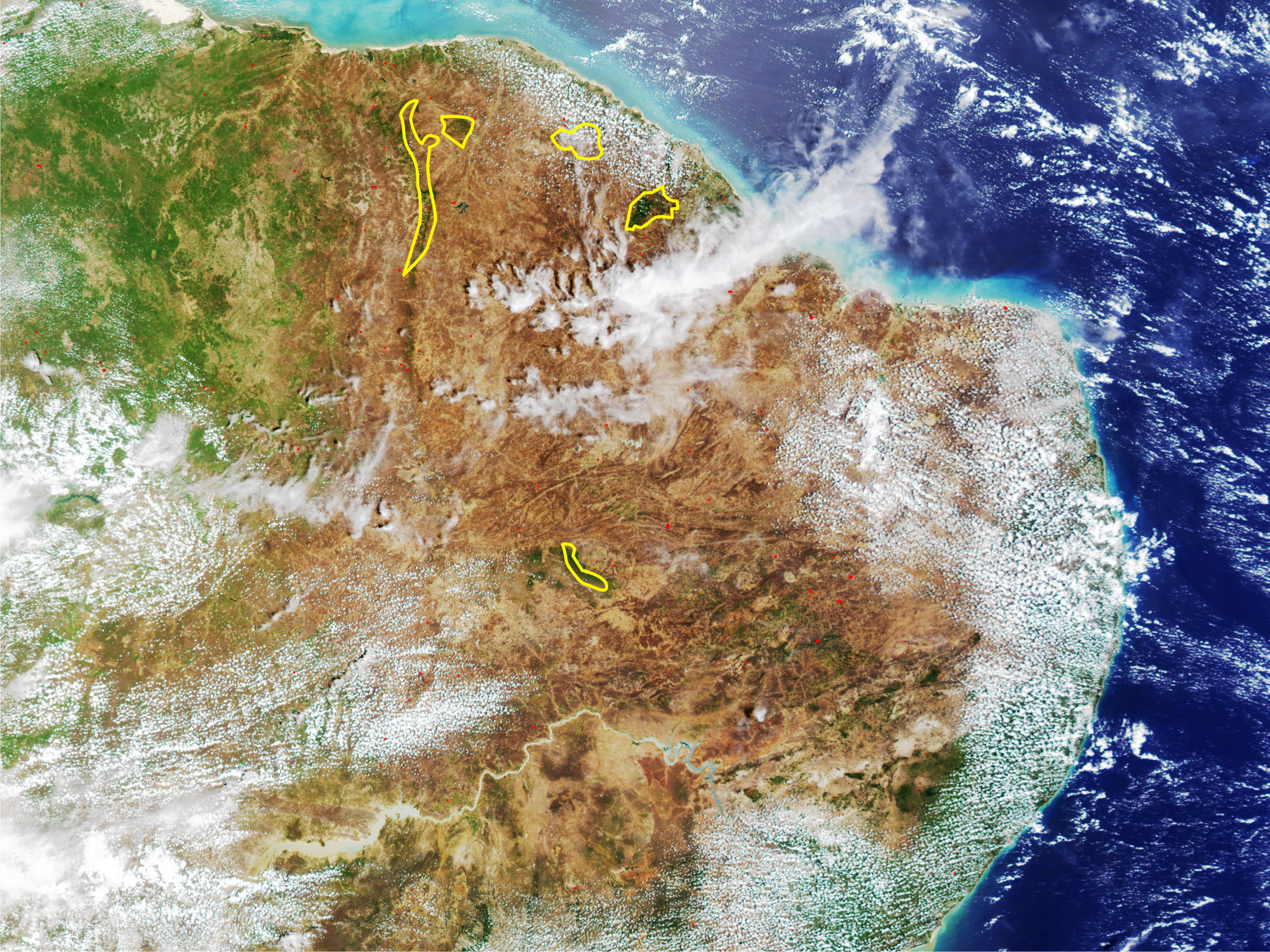
Satellite picture showing the localization of Caatinga enclaves moist forests in northeastern Brazil (yellow lines enclose the WWF defined limits).

== Conservation ==
Most birds endemic to these moist forests enclaves are considered threatened, primarily due to habitat loss, by BirdLife International and, consequently, IUCN. In general the status of other animals is comparably poorly known, but likely to be similar to that of the birds.

There are several protected areas in the ecoregion. Araripe-Apodi National Forest (Floresta Nacional Do Araripe-Apodi), the first national forest in Brazil, was established in 1946 to protect the moist forest enclave on the Chapada do Araripe. It has an area of 389.19 km^{2}.

== See also ==
- Caatinga xeric shrubland and thorn forests
- List of plants of Atlantic Forest vegetation of Brazil
- Ecoregions of the Atlantic Forest biome
- List of ecoregions in Brazil
