= Ubajara National Park =

National park in Ceará, Brazil

- Parque Nacional de Ubajara
- IUCN category II (national park)
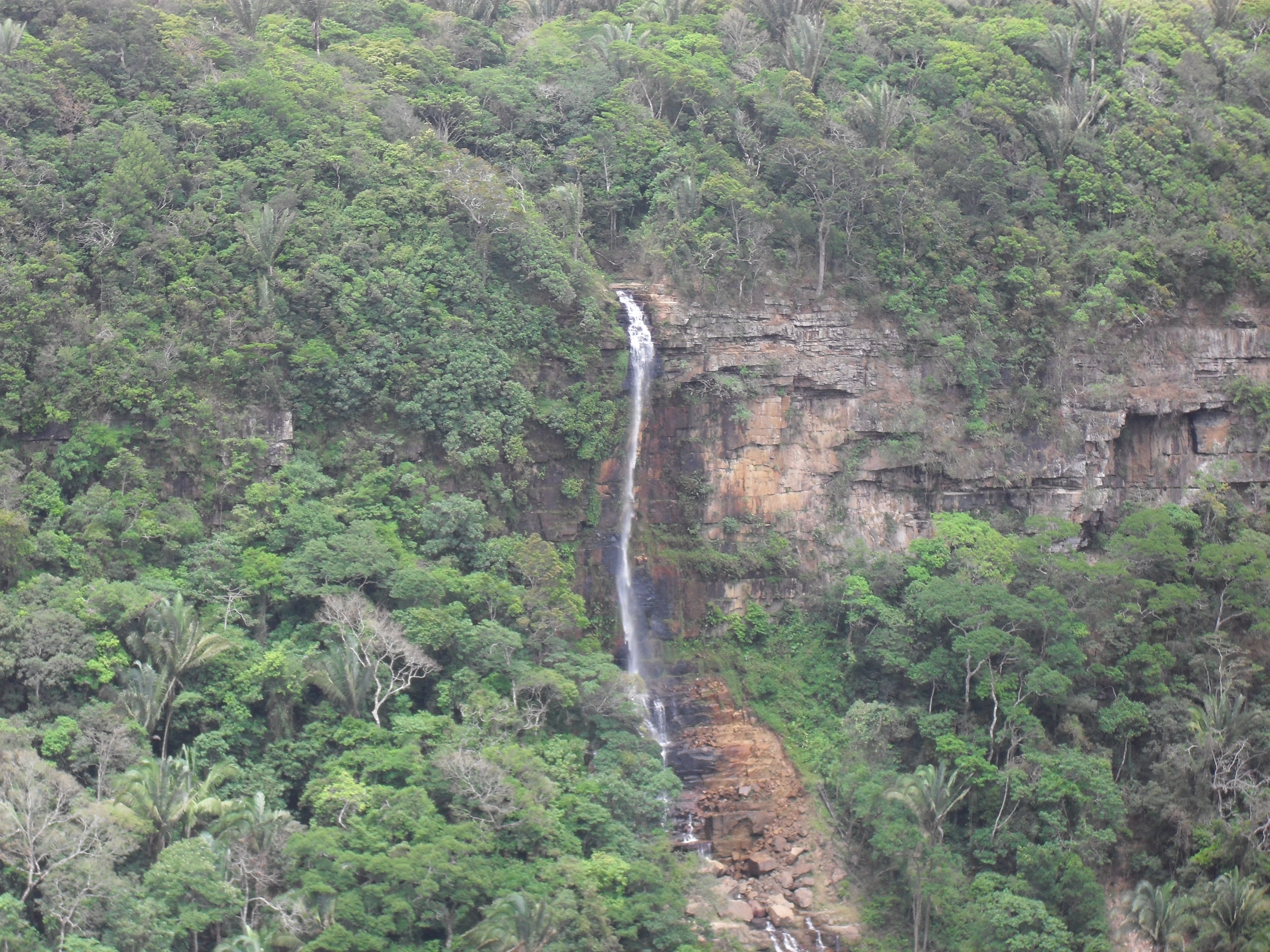
- Ubajara National Park

- Location within Brazil
- Nearest city: Ubajara, Ceará
- Coordinates: 3.725°S 40.904°W
- Area: 6,271 hectares (15,500 acres)
- Designation: National park
- Created: 30 April 1959
- Administrator: ICMBio

The Ubajara National Park (Portuguese: Parque Nacional de Ubajara) is a national park in the state of Ceará, Brazil. It is the smallest of the 35 national parks of Brazil and is known for the Ubajara grotto.

== Location ==
The park is in the Caatinga biome. It covers 6,271 hectares (15,500 acres). It was created by decree 45.954 of 30 April 1959, modified on 26 April 1973 and 13 December 2002. The park is administered by the Chico Mendes Institute for Biodiversity Conservation. It lies in the municipalities of Ubajara, Tianguá and Frecheirinha in Ceará. The park adjoins the 1,592,550 hectares (3,935,300 acres) Serra da Ibiapaba Environmental Protection Area to the west.

The park is in the western edge of Ceará peripheral depression and the Ibiapaba plateau. Average annual rainfall is 1,440 millimetres (57 in). Temperatures range from 16 to 28 °C (61 to 82 °F) with an average of 22 °C (72 °F). Altitudes range from 720 to 840 metres (2,360 to 2,760 ft) above sea level. The flora include remnants of the original forest as well as secondary growth and exotics.

== Conservation ==
The park is classified as IUCN protected area category II (national park). It has the objectives of preserving natural ecosystems of great ecological relevance and scenic beauty, enabling scientific research, environmental education, outdoors recreation and eco-tourism. Protected species in the park include the oncilla (Leopardus tigrinus), cougar (Puma concolor), Maranhão red-handed howler (Alouatta ululata), the variable antshrike (Thamnophilus caerulescens) and the frogs Adelophryne baturitensis and Adelophryne maranguapensis.

== Ubajara grotto ==
Set in a hillside in the Ibiapaba Mountains, 320 kilometres from Fortaleza, the grotto has impressive stalactite and stalagmite formations, the result of nature's patient work with limestone and water over many thousands of years - each centimetre of crystallised growth takes three years to form. Access to the grotto is by a chairlift. The park has waterfalls and paths through the forest. Visits are supervised by Ibama, the national body for environmental conservation, and must be arranged in advance. Other attractions in the Ibiapaba mountains include Morro do Céu, 820 metres high, and Pedra de Itagurussu, the source of the Pirangi waterfall.

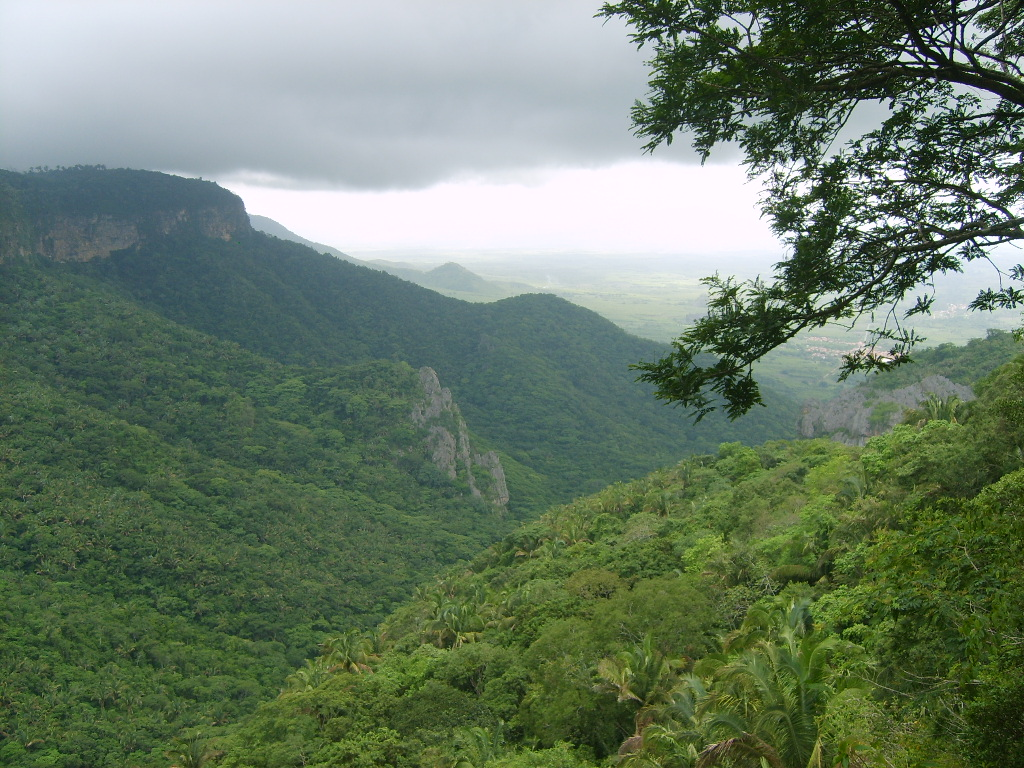

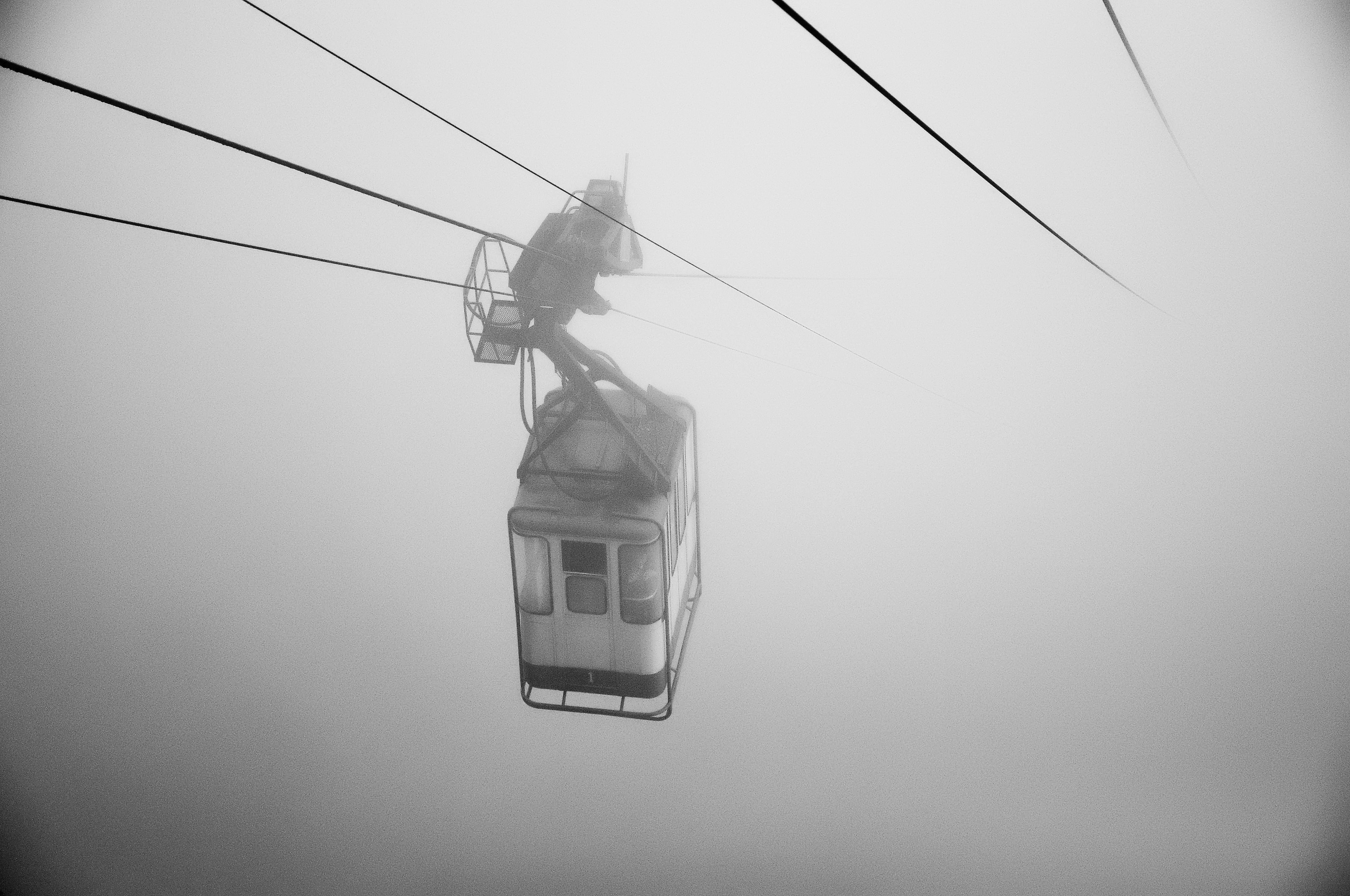

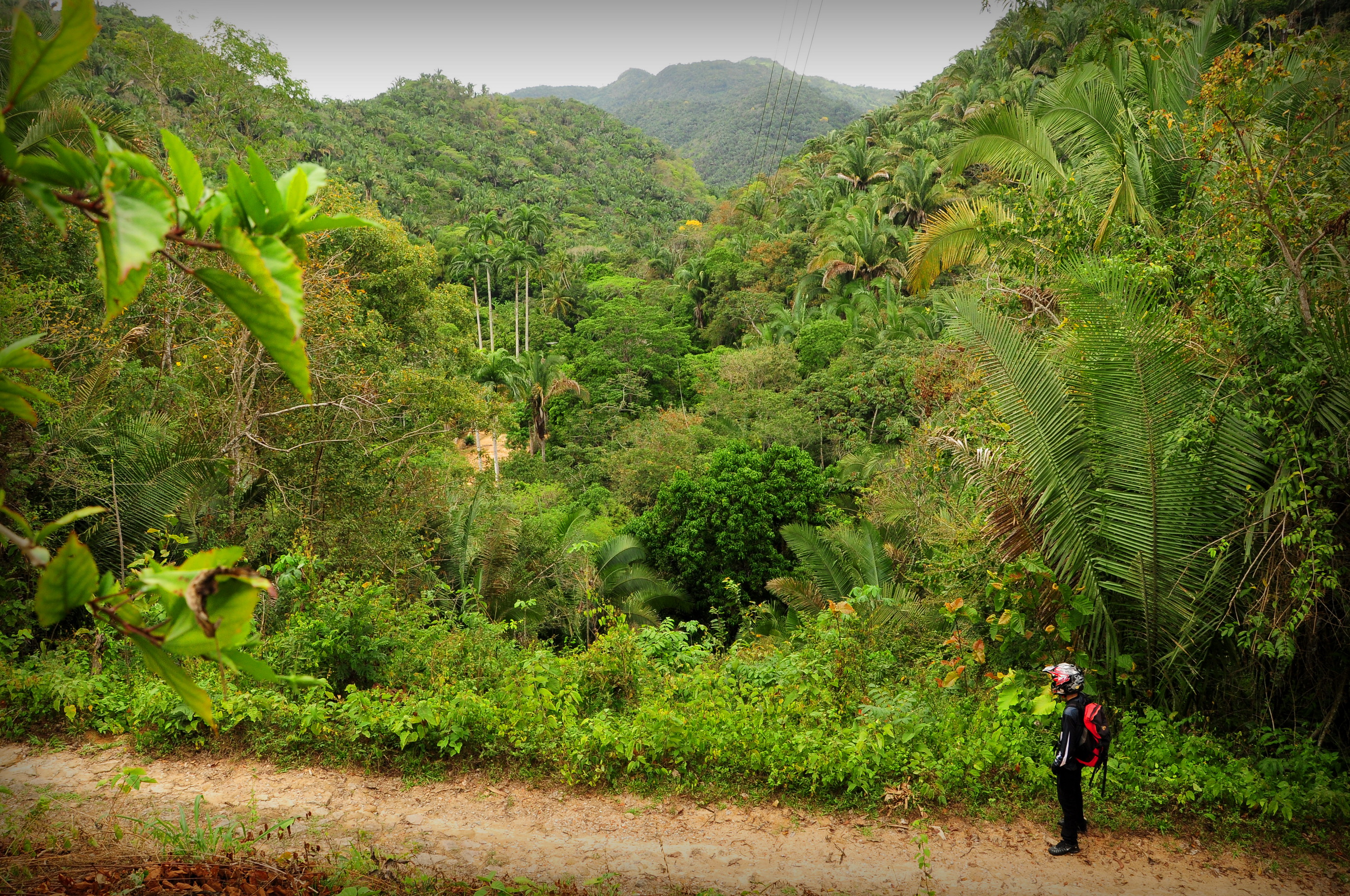

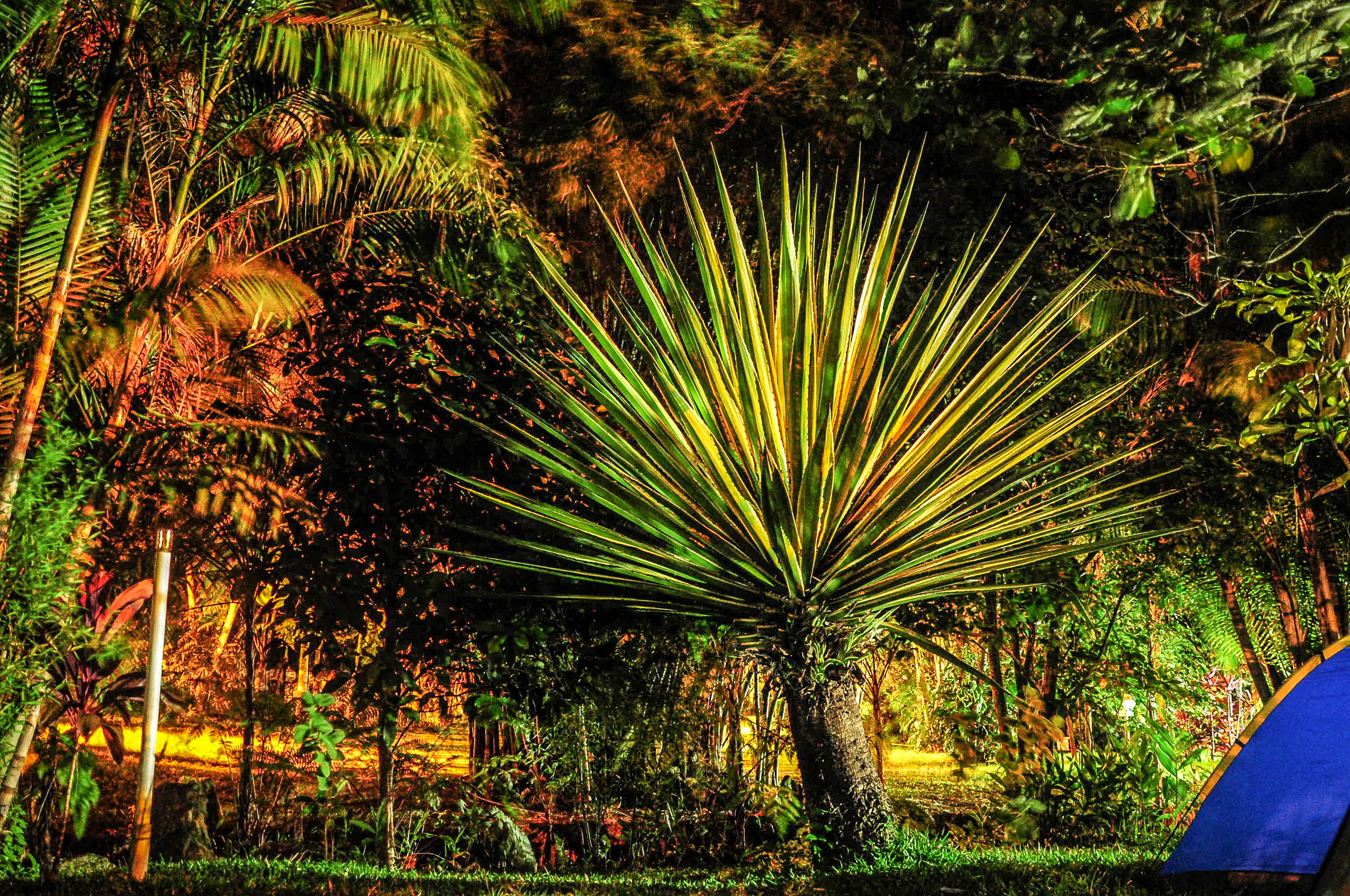

== Sources ==
- APA Serra da Ibiapaba (in Portuguese), ISA: Instituto Socioambiental
- Parque Nacional de Ubajara (in Portuguese), Chico Mendes Institute for Biodiversity Conservation, archived from the original on 2018-11-09
- Unidade de Conservação: Parque Nacional de Ubajara (in Portuguese), MMA: Ministério do Meio Ambiente
