= Polymeridium inspersum =

Scientific classification
- Kingdom: Fungi
- Division: Ascomycota
- Class: Dothideomycetes
- Order: Trypetheliales
- Family: Trypetheliaceae
- Genus: Polymeridium
- Species: P. inspersum

Binomial name
- Polymeridium inspersum Aptroot (2013)

Species of tropical bark dwelling lichen

Polymeridium inspersum is a species of corticolous (bark-dwelling) lichen in the family Trypetheliaceae. Found in pantropical regions, it was formally described as a new species in 2013 by Dutch lichenologist André Aptroot. This lichen closely resembles Polymeridium subcinereum but is differentiated by its inspersed hamathecium. The type specimen of P. inspersum was collected by the author in Kuranda, Queensland, along the Jumrum Creek track, growing on a twig.

The thallus of P. inspersum is ecorticate and pinkish-grey, exhibiting no fluorescence under ultraviolet light (UV−). The ascomata are 0.4–0.6 mm in diameter, with a spherical centrum that is erumpent and solitary. The ostiole is apical, and the hamathecium is inspersed with oil droplets, featuring filaments that profusely anastomose. Each ascus contains 8 ascospores, which are iodine-negative, 3-septate, and measure 16–20 by 3–5 μm. The ascospores are not ornamented, and their walls are not thickened. No chemical substances are detected in P. inspersum.

Polymeridium inspersum has a pantropical distribution, with reported specimens from Brazil and the Philippines. The type specimen and another Australian specimen were previously identified as P. subcinereum by Aptroot. Additional specimens have been examined from Queensland, Australia, and Chapada do Araripe, Ceará, Brazil.
