= Adelophryne patamona =

Conservation status
- Data Deficient (IUCN 3.1)

Scientific classification
- Kingdom: Animalia
- Phylum: Chordata
- Class: Amphibia
- Order: Anura
- Clade: Brachycephaloidea
- Family: Eleutherodactylidae
- Genus: Adelophryne
- Species: A. patamona

Binomial name
- Adelophryne patamona MacCulloch, Lathrop, Kok, Minter, Khan, and Barrio-Amorós, 2008

Species of amphibian

Adelophryne patamona is a species of frog in the family Eleutherodactylidae. It is endemic to the Pacaraima Mountains of southwestern Guyana, although it is likely to also occur in the adjacent Roraima state of Brazil. It is most closely related to A. gutturosa.

== Description ==
Adult males measure 17–18 mm (0.67–0.71 in) (based on just two individuals) and adult females 21–23 mm (0.83–0.91 in) in snout–vent length. It is the largest species of its genus. The snout is rounded. The tympanum is small and covered by a fold posterodorsally. The skin of the dorsum, venter, and limbs is smooth but has scattered small tubercles. The flanks and rear of the thighs are areolate. The front toes are flattened, unwebbed, and have small pointed discs at their tips. The back toes are also flattened, unwebbed, and have small narrow discs at their tips. Colouration is variable; the colour of the dorsum, flanks, and dorsal surfaces of limbs is medium brown, and there are black markings. Some specimens are darker and have more pale blue spots and more conspicuous tubercles on dorsum.

The male advertisement call is a group of three soft, unpulsed, whistle-like notes. The first two are short and third one is long, all produced in rapid succession.

== Habitat and conservation ==
Adelophryne patamona is known from medium-cover forests at elevations of 678–1,414 m (2,224–4,639 ft) above sea level (the highest of all Adelophryne species). Specimens have been found amidst leaf litter, among rootlets near the base of trees, and in ground holes covered by leaves. Males call in the afternoon and night, mostly from concealed sites.

This species is common in its native range. Human population is sparse in the area. However, gold mining the area could be a threat to its habitat.
