= Polymeridium multiseptatum =

Scientific classification
- Kingdom: Fungi
- Division: Ascomycota
- Class: Dothideomycetes
- Order: Trypetheliales
- Family: Trypetheliaceae
- Genus: Polymeridium
- Species: P. multiseptatum

Binomial name
- Polymeridium multiseptatum Aptroot, A.A.Menezes & M.Cáceres (2013)

Species of lichen

Polymeridium multiseptatum is a species of corticolous (bark-dwelling) lichen in the family Trypetheliaceae. Found in Brazil, it was described by lichenologists André Aptroot, Aline Anjos Menezes, and Marcela Cáceres in 2013. The thallus of P. multiseptatum is ecorticate and whitish-grey in color, with the distinctive feature of fluorescing yellow under ultraviolet light. This lichen closely resembles Polymeridium quinqueseptatum, with the primary distinguishing characteristic being the UV+ (yellow) thallus. The ascomata are 0.2–0.4 mm in diameter, featuring a solitary, spherical centrum that is erumpent. The ostiole is apical, and the hamathecium is interspersed with oil droplets, with filaments profusely anastomosing. There are eight ascospores per ascus, which are iodine-negative, 4–7-septate, and measure 18–28 by 5–7 μm. The ascospores are not ornamented, and the wall is not thickened. The lichen's chemistry reveals the presence of lichexanthone. The type specimens were collected in Chapada do Araripe, Ceará, at an altitude of 800 m (2,600 ft), where it was found growing on tree bark.
