= Polymeridium albidoreagens =

Scientific classification
- Kingdom: Fungi
- Division: Ascomycota
- Class: Dothideomycetes
- Order: Trypetheliales
- Family: Trypetheliaceae
- Genus: Polymeridium
- Species: P. albidoreagens

Binomial name
- Polymeridium albidoreagens Aptroot, A.A.Menezes & M.Cáceres (2013)

Species of lichen

Polymeridium albidoreagens is a species of corticolous (bark-dwelling) lichen in the family Trypetheliaceae. Found in Brazil, it was formally described as a new species in 2013 by lichenologists André Aptroot, Aline Anjos Menezes, and Marcela Cáceres. The type specimen was collected in Rondônia's Porto Velho, Parque Natural Municipal, at an altitude of 100 m (330 ft); other specimens have been reported from Ceará in the Chapada do Araripe. This lichen species is similar to Polymeridium albidum but is characterized by its UV+ (yellow) thallus. The ecorticate, whitish-grey thallus features spherical, erumpent, solitary ascomata with diameters ranging from 0.2 to 0.4 mm and an apical ostiole. The hamathecium is not inspersed, and the ascospores number 8 per ascus, contain 3 septa, and measure 20–23 by 6–8 μm without ornamentation. The lichen's chemistry includes the presence of lichexanthone.
