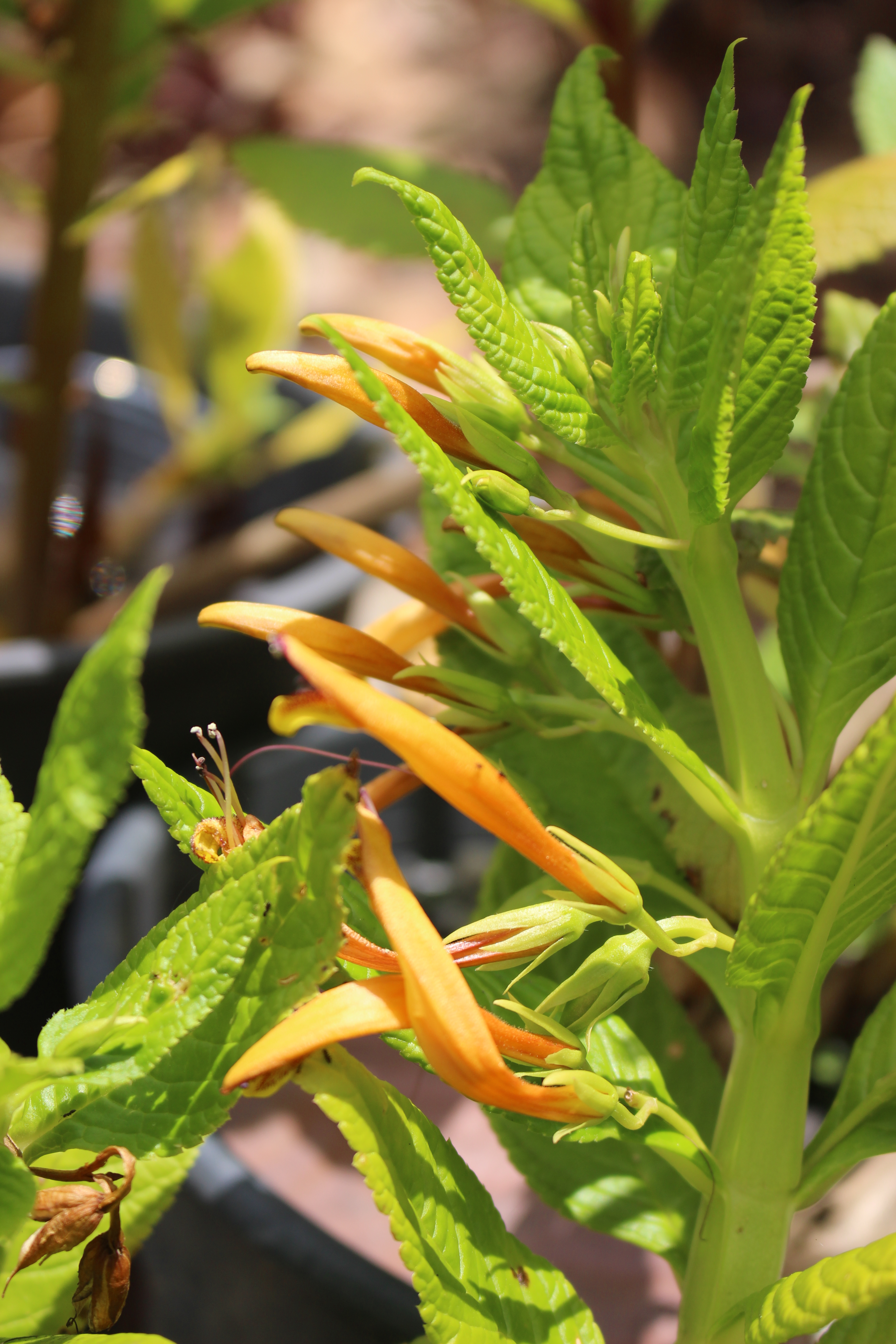
- Ameroglossum pernambucense in Paraiba, Brazil

Conservation status
- Endangered (IUCN 3.1)

Scientific classification
- Kingdom: Plantae
- Clade: Tracheophytes
- Clade: Angiosperms
- Clade: Eudicots
- Clade: Asterids
- Order: Lamiales
- Family: Scrophulariaceae
- Genus: Ameroglossum
- Species: A. pernambucense

Binomial name
- Ameroglossum pernambucense Eb.Fisch, S.Vogel & A.V.Lopes

= Ameroglossum pernambucense =

Species of flowering plant

Ameroglossum pernambucense is a species of flowering plant endemic to the Borborema Plateau in Pernambuco in north-eastern Brazil. It is only found on granitic rocky outcrops in moist forest enclaves from 723 to 1,215 metres elevation. The species is threatened by drought, fires, quarrying, trampling and cattle pasturing.
