= Polymeridium alboflavescens =

Scientific classification
- Kingdom: Fungi
- Division: Ascomycota
- Class: Dothideomycetes
- Order: Trypetheliales
- Family: Trypetheliaceae
- Genus: Polymeridium
- Species: P. alboflavescens

Binomial name
- Polymeridium alboflavescens Aptroot (2013)

Species of lichen

Polymeridium alboflavescens is a species of corticolous (bark-dwelling) lichen in the family Trypetheliaceae. First described from specimens collected in Venezuela, it closely resembles Polymeridium albocinereum but exhibits a UV+ (yellow) thallus. The ecorticate, whitish-grey thallus is characterized by spherical, erumpent, solitary ascomata measuring 0.3–0.5 mm in diameter, with an apical ostiole. The hamathecium is not inspersed, and the ascospores number 8 per ascus, contain 7 to 11 septa, and measure 28–39 by 6–9 μm without ornamentation. The lichen's chemistry features lichexanthone. In addition to the Venezuelan holotype, Polymeridium alboflavescens has been reported in Brazil, particularly in the Ceará region at the Chapada do Araripe, where several specimens were collected in 2012.
