= Adelophryne pachydactyla =

Conservation status
- Least Concern (IUCN 3.1)

Scientific classification
- Kingdom: Animalia
- Phylum: Chordata
- Class: Amphibia
- Order: Anura
- Family: Eleutherodactylidae
- Genus: Adelophryne
- Species: A. pachydactyla

Binomial name
- Adelophryne pachydactyla Hoogmoed, Borges, and Cascon, 1994

Species of frog

Adelophryne pachydactyla is a species of frog in the family Eleutherodactylidae. It is endemic to the coastal area of south-central Bahia state, Brazil. Some specimens first identified as A. pachydactyla have later been found to represent a new species, Adelophryne mucronatus; the two species can occur in sympatry. The specific name pachydactyla is derived from Greek pachys (=thick) and daktylos (=finger), referring to the thick, short, swollen fingers of this frog.

== Description ==
Adelophryne pachydactyla was described based on a single specimen, the holotype. It is an adult male measuring 11 mm (0.4 in) in snout–vent length, and with a subgular vocal sac. The head is slightly longer than it is wide. The snout is rounded. The tympanic annulus is incomplete, obscured by skin in its upper parts. There is no supra-tympanic fold and the canthus rostralis is indistinct. The limbs are not too long. The fingers lack discs and are short with swollen subdigital pads. The toes have small discs and no webbing. The body is blackish brown with grey spots dorsally and black under. The iris is reddish.

== Habitat and conservation ==
Little is known of this species; the holotype was collected at night on a cacao farm under cacao trees, bananas, and some larger shade trees, found on the ground in the leaf-litter near a small creek. At another site they were collected in terrestrial bromeliads in a forest. The records are from below 800 m (2,620 ft).

The probable threat to this species is habitat loss caused by agriculture, wood plantations, collection of bromeliads, and logging. It occurs in the Serra do Jequitibá Natural Heritage Reserve.
