= Polymeridium catapastoides =

Scientific classification
- Kingdom: Fungi
- Division: Ascomycota
- Class: Dothideomycetes
- Order: Trypetheliales
- Family: Trypetheliaceae
- Genus: Polymeridium
- Species: P. catapastoides

Binomial name
- Polymeridium catapastoides Aptroot (2013)

Species of lichen

Polymeridium catapastoides is a species of corticolous (bark-dwelling) lichen in the family Trypetheliaceae. It has a widespread distribution, with occurrences reported in Australia, Malaysia, Thailand, Indonesia, Papua New Guinea, and Brazil. The lichen was formally described as a new species in 2013 by Dutch lichenologist André Aptroot. Resembling Polymeridium catapastum, P. catapastoides can be differentiated by its non-fluorescent thallus under ultraviolet light (UV−). The type specimen was collected in Cape Tribulation, Queensland (Australia), north of Daintree, growing on tree bark.

The thallus of P. catapastoides is ecorticate, yellowish-white, and non-fluorescent under ultraviolet light. The ascomata measure 0.4–0.6 mm in diameter with a spherical centrum that is erumpent and solitary. The ostiole is apical or partly lateral, and the hamathecium is not inspersed with oil droplets. Each ascus contains 4–8 iodine-negative ascospores, which are 3-septate and measure 24–32 by 6–11 μm. The ascospores are not ornamented, and no chemical substances are detected in P. catapastoides.

In addition to the type specimen from Australia, P. catapastoides has also been reported from Malaysia and Thailand, previously as P. catapastum. Additional specimens have been examined from various locations, including Indonesia, Papua New Guinea, and Chapada do Araripe, Ceará, Brazil.
