= Polymeridium multiforme =

Scientific classification
- Kingdom: Fungi
- Division: Ascomycota
- Class: Dothideomycetes
- Order: Trypetheliales
- Family: Trypetheliaceae
- Genus: Polymeridium
- Species: P. multiforme

Binomial name
- Polymeridium multiforme Aptroot (2013)

Species of lichen

Polymeridium multiforme is a species of corticolous (bark-dwelling) lichen in the family Trypetheliaceae. It is found in the Neotropics, with specimens recorded from Brazil, Guyana, and Venezuela. The lichen was described by Dutch lichenologist André Aptroot in 2013. This lichen closely resembles Polymeridium quinqueseptatum, but its thallus is whitish-grey and fluoresces yellow under ultraviolet light (UV+ yellow). Additionally, the hamathecium of P. multiforme is not interspersed with oil droplets. The type specimen was collected in Guyana, at the base of Makarapan Mountain, on the bark of a Myrsinaceae tree.

The ascomata of P. multiforme are 0.2–0.3 mm in diameter, with a spherical centrum that is erumpent and solitary. The ostiole is apical, and the hamathecium features filaments that profusely anastomose. There are eight ascospores per ascus, which are iodine-negative, 4–7-septate, and measure 19–26 by 5–7 μm. The ascospores are not ornamented, and their walls are not thickened. Lichexanthone is present in the lichen's chemistry.
