= Polymeridium endoflavens =

Scientific classification
- Kingdom: Fungi
- Division: Ascomycota
- Class: Dothideomycetes
- Order: Trypetheliales
- Family: Trypetheliaceae
- Genus: Polymeridium
- Species: P. endoflavens

Binomial name
- Polymeridium endoflavens Aptroot, D.S.Andrade & M.Cáceres (2016)

Species of lichen

Polymeridium endoflavens is a species of lichen in the family Trypetheliaceae, first described in 2016. This species is found in Brazil.

== Taxonomy ==
Polymeridium endoflavens was formally described by the lichenologists André Aptroot, Danyelly Santos Andrade, and Marcela Eugenia da Silva Cáceres in 2016. The type specimen was collected in Mata do Junco, Santa Luzia do Itanhy, Sergipe, Brazil, at an elevation of approximately 150 m (490 ft), by the second author.

== Description ==
The thallus of Polymeridium endoflavens is not corticate, dull, continuous, covering areas up to 2 cm (3/4 in) in diameter, and whitish in colour. It is surrounded by a black prothallus line approximately 0.6 mm wide and does not induce gall formation on the host bark. Ascomata are spherical, measuring 0.25–0.35 mm in diameter, single, and emergent from the thallus. The wall is carbonised and up to 40 μm thick. Ostioles are apical, not fused, flat, and black. The hamathecium is inspersed with yellow oil globules. Asci contain eight ascospores each. Ascospores are hyaline (translucent), 5–7-septate, fusiform, measuring 32–37 by 10–13 μm, with pointed ends and rounded lumina, and are not surrounded by a gelatinous layer. Pycnidia were not observed.

The thallus surface of Polymeridium endoflavens is UV+ (yellow); other lichen spot tests are negative. Thin-layer chromatography analysis reveals the presence of lichexanthone, a lichen product that causes the thallus to fluoresce when lit with a long-wavelength UV light.

== Habitat and distribution ==
This species is found on the smooth bark of trees in the Atlantic Forest and is currently known only from Brazil.
