= Polymeridium submuriforme =

Scientific classification
- Kingdom: Fungi
- Division: Ascomycota
- Class: Dothideomycetes
- Order: Trypetheliales
- Family: Trypetheliaceae
- Genus: Polymeridium
- Species: P. submuriforme

Binomial name
- Polymeridium submuriforme Aptroot (2013)

Species of lichen

Polymeridium submuriforme is a species of corticolous (bark-dwelling) lichen in the family Trypetheliaceae. It occurs in the Philippines. This ecorticate lichen is characterized by its pinkish-grey thallus, which does not fluoresce under ultraviolet light. P. submuriforme is similar to Polymeridium cinereonigricans but can be distinguished by its much smaller ascospores and inspersed hamathecium. The ascomata measure 0.3–0.6 mm in diameter, with a solitary, spherical centrum that is erumpent. As the ascomata age, the wall expands up to 0.2 mm sideways. The ostiole is apical, and the hamathecium is inspersed. The ascospores number 6–8 per ascus, iodine-negative, somewhat muriform, and measure 18–20 by 6–7.5 μm. These ascospores are not ornamented and are surrounded by a 1–2 μm wide gelatinous sheath. No chemical substances have been detected in this lichen. The type specimen was collected from Leyte on tree bark.
