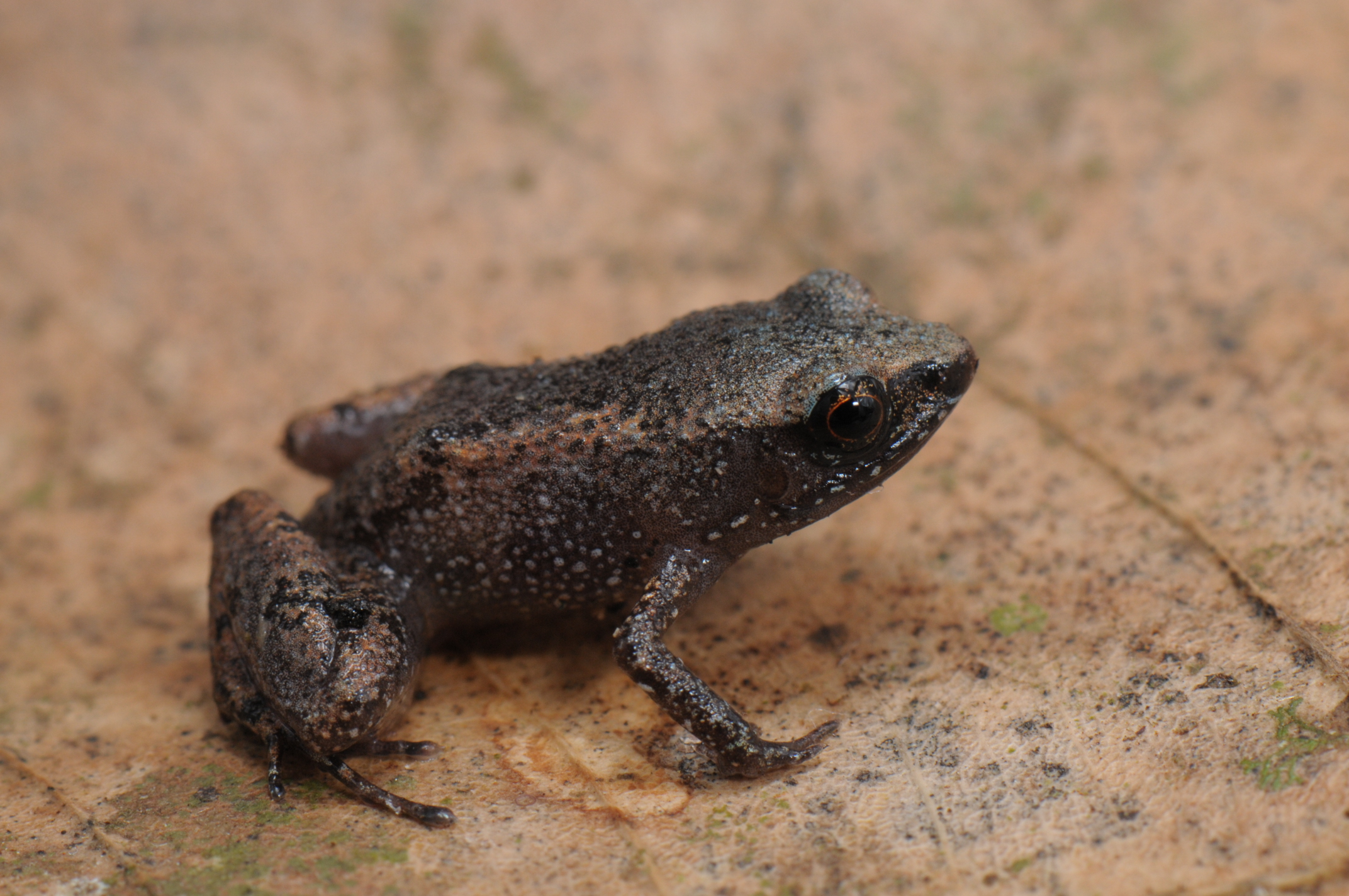
- Adelophryne mucronatus

Scientific classification
- Kingdom: Animalia
- Phylum: Chordata
- Class: Amphibia
- Order: Anura
- Family: Eleutherodactylidae
- Subfamily: Phyzelaphryninae
- Genus: Adelophryne; Hoogmoed and Lescure, 1984

Type species
- Adelophryne adiastola Hoogmoed and Lescure, 1984

Species
- 12, see text

= Adelophryne =

Genus of amphibians

Adelophryne is a genus of frogs in the family Eleutherodactylidae. They are native to northern South America east of the Andes, known roughly from the area corresponding to the Guiana Shield, as well as to the coastal area of Bahia, Brazil. Whether the genus is truly distinct from Phyzelaphryne remains uncertain. Common name shield frogs has been proposed for this genus, although the stem flea frog is used for some species.

== Etymology ==
The generic name is derived from the Greek words adelos, meaning "unseen, unknown, obscure", and phryne for "toad". It refers to the fact that these small frogs were seldom collected until relatively lately.

== Description ==
Adelophryne are small leaf-litter frogs. Adults of the largest species, A. patamona, measure no more than 23 mm (0.91 in) in snout–to–vent length and the remaining all are less than 17.5 mm (0.69 in). At 7.6–9.1 mm (0.30–0.36 in) in males and 10–11.4 mm (0.39–0.45 in) in females, A. michelin is not only the smallest in the genus, but among the smallest frogs of the Americas, with only a few Brachycephalus species, Eleutherodactylus iberia and E. limbatus being of roughly similar size.

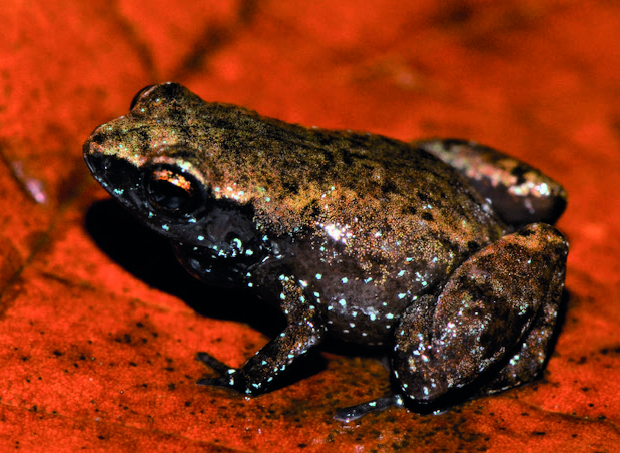
Adelophryne amapaensis

The pupil of Adelophryne is oval and horizontally oriented. The tympanum is distinct. The digits are flattened and have asymmetrically pointed, laterally grooved, elongate discs. No webbing is present. The fourth finger is reduced in size. Males have a large, external subgular vocal sac.

Reproduction is through direct development, that is, eggs hatch directly into froglets, without free-living larval (tadpole) stage. Before this was confirmed for Adelophryne maranguapensis, the relatively large size of the eggs in this genus led many researcher to conclude that direct development was likely to be present.

== Species ==
As of July 2021, there are twelve species:

- Adelophryne adiastola Hoogmoed and Lescure, 1984
- Adelophryne amapaensis Taucce, Costa-Campos, Haddad & de Carvalho, 2020
- Adelophryne baturitensis Hoogmoed, Borges, and Cascon, 1994
- Adelophryne glandulata Lourenço de Moraes, Ferreira, Fouquet, and Bastos, 2014
- Adelophryne gutturosa Hoogmoed and Lescure, 1984
- Adelophryne maranguapensis Hoogmoed, Borges, and Cascon, 1994
- Adelophryne meridionalis Santana, Fonseca, Neves, and Carvalho, 2012
- Adelophryne michelin Lourenço-de-Moraes, Dias, Mira-Mendes, de Oliveira, Barth, Ruas, Vences, Solé, and Bastos, 2018
- Adelophryne mucronatus Lourenço-de-Moraes, Solé, and Toledo, 2012
- Adelophryne nordestina Lourenço-de-Moraes, Lisboa, Drummond, Moura, Moura, Lyra, Guarnieri, Mott, Hoogmoed, and Santana, 2021
- Adelophryne pachydactyla Hoogmoed, Borges, and Cascon, 1994
- Adelophryne patamona MacCulloch, Lathrop, Kok, Minter, Khan, and Barrio-Amoros, 2008

The genus is likely to contain several undescribed species.

== See also ==
Common coquí: Eleutherodactylus coqui
