= Polymeridium tribulationis =

Scientific classification
- Kingdom: Fungi
- Division: Ascomycota
- Class: Dothideomycetes
- Order: Trypetheliales
- Family: Trypetheliaceae
- Genus: Polymeridium
- Species: P. tribulationis

Binomial name
- Polymeridium tribulationis Aptroot (2013)

Species of lichen

Polymeridium tribulationis is a species of corticolous (bark-dwelling) lichen in the family Trypetheliaceae. Found in Australia, it was formally described as a new species in 2013 by Dutch lichenologist André Aptroot. This ecorticate lichen is characterized by its yellowish-white thallus, which does not fluoresce under ultraviolet light. P. tribulationis closely resembles Polymeridium sulphurescens, but can be distinguished by its hamathecium, which is inspersed with oil droplets. The ascomata, measuring 0.4–0.6 mm in diameter, have a spherical centrum that is mostly covered by the thallus. The ostiole is apical and usually surrounded by a ring. The ascospores number eight per ascus, are iodine-negative, have three septa, and measure 20–24 by 7–10 μm without ornamentation. No chemical substances have been detected in the lichen. The type specimen was collected by Mason Hale from Cape Tribulation, Queensland, on tree bark.
