= Polymeridium costaricense =

Scientific classification
- Kingdom: Fungi
- Division: Ascomycota
- Class: Dothideomycetes
- Order: Trypetheliales
- Family: Trypetheliaceae
- Genus: Polymeridium
- Species: P. costaricense

Binomial name
- Polymeridium costaricense Aptroot (2013)

Species of lichen

Polymeridium costaricense is a species of corticolous (bark-dwelling) lichen in the family Trypetheliaceae. Found in Costa Rica and Brazil, it was formally described as a new species in 2013 by Dutch lichenologist André Aptroot. The lichen bears a resemblance to Polymeridium chioneum but is differentiated by its non-fluorescent thallus under ultraviolet light (UV−). The type specimen of P. costaricense was collected in Palo Verde National Park, Guanacaste, Costa Rica, along the trail to Rio Tempisque, growing on tree bark. The type specimen of P. costaricense was initially reported and illustrated as P. chioneum by Aptroot and colleagues in 2008. Additional specimens have been examined from Chapada do Araraipe, Ceará, Brazil.

The thallus of P. costaricense is ecorticate and whitish-grey, lacking fluorescence under ultraviolet light. The ascomata measure 0.4–0.6 mm in diameter, with a spherical centrum that is erumpent and solitary. The ostiole is apical, and the hamathecium is inspersed, featuring filaments that profusely anastomose. Each ascus contains eight hyaline ascospores, which are iodine-negative, 8–12-septate, and measure 40–50 by 9–11 μm. The ascospores are not ornamented, and their walls are not thickened. No chemical substances are detected in P. costaricense.
