= Polymeridium neuwirthii =

Scientific classification
- Kingdom: Fungi
- Division: Ascomycota
- Class: Dothideomycetes
- Order: Trypetheliales
- Family: Trypetheliaceae
- Genus: Polymeridium
- Species: P. neuwirthii

Binomial name
- Polymeridium neuwirthii Aptroot (2013)

Species of lichen

Polymeridium neuwirthii is a species of corticolous (bark-dwelling) lichen in the family Trypetheliaceae. Found in Venezuela, it was formally described as a new species in 2014 by Dutch lichenologist André Aptroot. This ecorticate lichen has a pinkish-grey thallus that does not fluoresce under ultraviolet light. P. neuwirthii is similar to Polymeridium quinqueseptatum but can be differentiated by its hamathecium inspersed with large oil droplets and consistently 7-septate, rough ascospores. The ascomata are 0.4–0.6 mm in diameter, with a spherical centrum that is erumpent and solitary. The ostiole is apical, and the hamathecium contains large oil droplets. There are eight ascospores per ascus, which are iodine-negative, 7-septate, and measure 30–33 by 9–10 μm. The ascospore wall is roughly ornamented. No chemical substances have been detected in this lichen. The type specimen was collected in Puerto Ayacucho, Venezuela, on a twig of a shrub. The species is named in honour of the collector of the type and only specimen, Gerhard Neuwirth.
