= Polymeridium albidovarians =

Scientific classification
- Kingdom: Fungi
- Division: Ascomycota
- Class: Dothideomycetes
- Order: Trypetheliales
- Family: Trypetheliaceae
- Genus: Polymeridium
- Species: P. albidovarians

Binomial name
- Polymeridium albidovarians Aptroot (2013)

Species of lichen

Polymeridium albidovarians is a species of corticolous (bark-dwelling) lichen in the family Trypetheliaceae. The lichen was first discovered in Indonesia on the island of Java, specifically at the Kawi-complex, Tjemarakandang, at an altitude of 2,700 m (8,900 ft). This species closely resembles Polymeridium albidum, but is differentiated by its UV+ (yellow) thallus and inspersed hamathecium. The yellowish-white, ecorticate thallus features spherical, erumpent, solitary ascomata measuring 0.2–0.4 mm in diameter, with an apical ostiole. The hamathecium is inspersed with oil droplets, and the ascospores number eight per ascus, contain three septa, and measure 20–23 by 6–8 μm without ornamentation. The lichen's chemistry is characterized by the presence of lichexanthone.
