= Monotagma rudanii =

Conservation status
- Endangered (IUCN 3.1)

Scientific classification
- Kingdom: Plantae
- Clade: Tracheophytes
- Clade: Angiosperms
- Clade: Monocots
- Clade: Commelinids
- Order: Zingiberales
- Family: Marantaceae
- Genus: Monotagma
- Species: M. rudanii

Binomial name
- Monotagma rudanii Hagberg

Species of flowering plant

Monotagma rudanii is a species of plant in the Marantaceae family. It is endemic to Ecuador. Its natural habitat is subtropical or tropical moist montane forests.

Monotagma rudanii was first described by Mats Hagberg in 1988. This plant was collected just once, in 1985. Monotagma rudanii is classified as endangered and is threatened by habitat destruction.
