= Polymeridium rhodopruinosum =

Scientific classification
- Kingdom: Fungi
- Division: Ascomycota
- Class: Dothideomycetes
- Order: Trypetheliales
- Family: Trypetheliaceae
- Genus: Polymeridium
- Species: P. rhodopruinosum

Binomial name
- Polymeridium rhodopruinosum Aptroot & Mercado Diaz (2016)

Species of lichen

Polymeridium rhodopruinosum is a species of corticolous (bark-dwelling), crustose lichen in the family Trypetheliaceae. Found in Puerto Rico, it was formally described as a new species in 2016 by Dutch lichenologist André Aptroot. The type specimen was collected by the author from Vereda Los Viveros in the Maricao State Forest (Maricao) at an altitude of 850 m (2,790 ft); there, it was found in a sclerophyllous forest growing on tree bark. The lichen has a white thallus lacking a cortex. The only lichen product detected from collected specimens using thin-layer chromatography was an anthraquinone compound. The combination of characteristics of the lichen that distinguish it from others in Polymeridium are the ascomata with external, red pruina that turn dark blood red with a K+ spot test; and the dimensions of its ascospores (17–19 by 4–5 μm).
