= Polymeridium longiflavens =

Scientific classification
- Kingdom: Fungi
- Division: Ascomycota
- Class: Dothideomycetes
- Order: Trypetheliales
- Family: Trypetheliaceae
- Genus: Polymeridium
- Species: P. longiflavens

Binomial name
- Polymeridium longiflavens Aptroot, Mendonça & M.Cáceres (2016)

Species of lichen

Polymeridium longiflavens is a species of corticolous (bark-dwelling) crustose lichen in the family Trypetheliaceae, first described in 2016. It is found in Brazil.

== Taxonomy ==
Polymeridium longiflavens was formally described by André Aptroot, Cléverton de Oliveira Mendonça, and Marcela Eugenia da Silva Cáceres in 2016. The type specimen was collected in the Serra de Itabaiana National Park, Sergipe, Brazil, at an elevation of approximately 400 m (1,300 ft).

== Description ==
The thallus of Polymeridium longiflavens is not corticate, dull, continuous, covering areas up to 2 cm (0.8 in) in diameter, and whitish-grey in colour. It is surrounded by a cottony dark brown hypothallus line approximately 0.4 mm wide and does not induce gall formation on the host bark. Ascomata are spherical, measuring 0.25–0.35 mm in diameter, single, and emergent from the thallus. The wall is carbonized and up to 40 μm thick. Ostioles are apical, not fused, flat, and black. The hamathecium is inspersed with yellow oil globules. Asci contain eight ascospores each. Ascospores are hyaline, have between 9 and 11 septa, fusiform, measuring 57–70 by 12–14 μm, with pointed ends and rounded lumina, and are not surrounded by a gelatinous layer. Pycnidia were not observed.

The thallus surface of Polymeridium longiflavens is UV+ (yellow), but does not react with standard chemical spot tests. Thin-layer chromatography analysis reveals the presence of lichexanthone.

== Habitat and distribution ==
This species is found on the smooth bark of trees in transitional forests and at the time of its original publication was known to occur only in Brazil.
