= Polymeridium xanthoexcentricum =

Scientific classification
- Domain: Eukaryota
- Kingdom: Fungi
- Division: Ascomycota
- Class: Dothideomycetes
- Order: Trypetheliales
- Family: Trypetheliaceae
- Genus: Polymeridium
- Species: P. xanthoexcentricum

Binomial name
- Polymeridium xanthoexcentricum Flakus & Aptroot (2016)

Species of lichen

Polymeridium xanthoexcentricum is a species of corticolous (bark-dwelling), crustose lichen in the family Trypetheliaceae. It is found in southwestern Bolivia.

== Taxonomy ==
The lichen was formally described as a new species in 2016 by lichenologists Adam Flakus and André Aptroot. The type specimen was collected in the Kaa-Iya del Gran Chaco National Park and Integrated Management Natural Area (Cordillera Province, Santa Cruz) at an elevation of 278 m (912 ft); there it was found in the Chiquitano dry forests. It is only known to occur in this habitat in Bolivia.

== Description ==
The thallus of the lichen is grey, smooth to somewhat bullate, and covers an area of up to about 6 cm (2.4 in) in diameter. It lacks both a cortex and a prothallus. Although parts of the thallus are endophloeodal–immersed in the bark–the presence of the lichen does not induce the formation of galls in the host. The ascomata are more or less spherical, measuring 0.2–0.5 mm in diameter. Typically, they occur singly, although occasionally 2 or 3 will fuse together. The ostioles have an off-center (eccentric) placement. The lichen contains lichexanthone, which is a lichen product that causes the thallus to fluoresce a yellow colour when lit with a long-wavelength UV light. The species epithet xanthoexcentricum refers to two main characters of this lichen: the presence of lichexanthone and the eccentric ostiolar placement.
