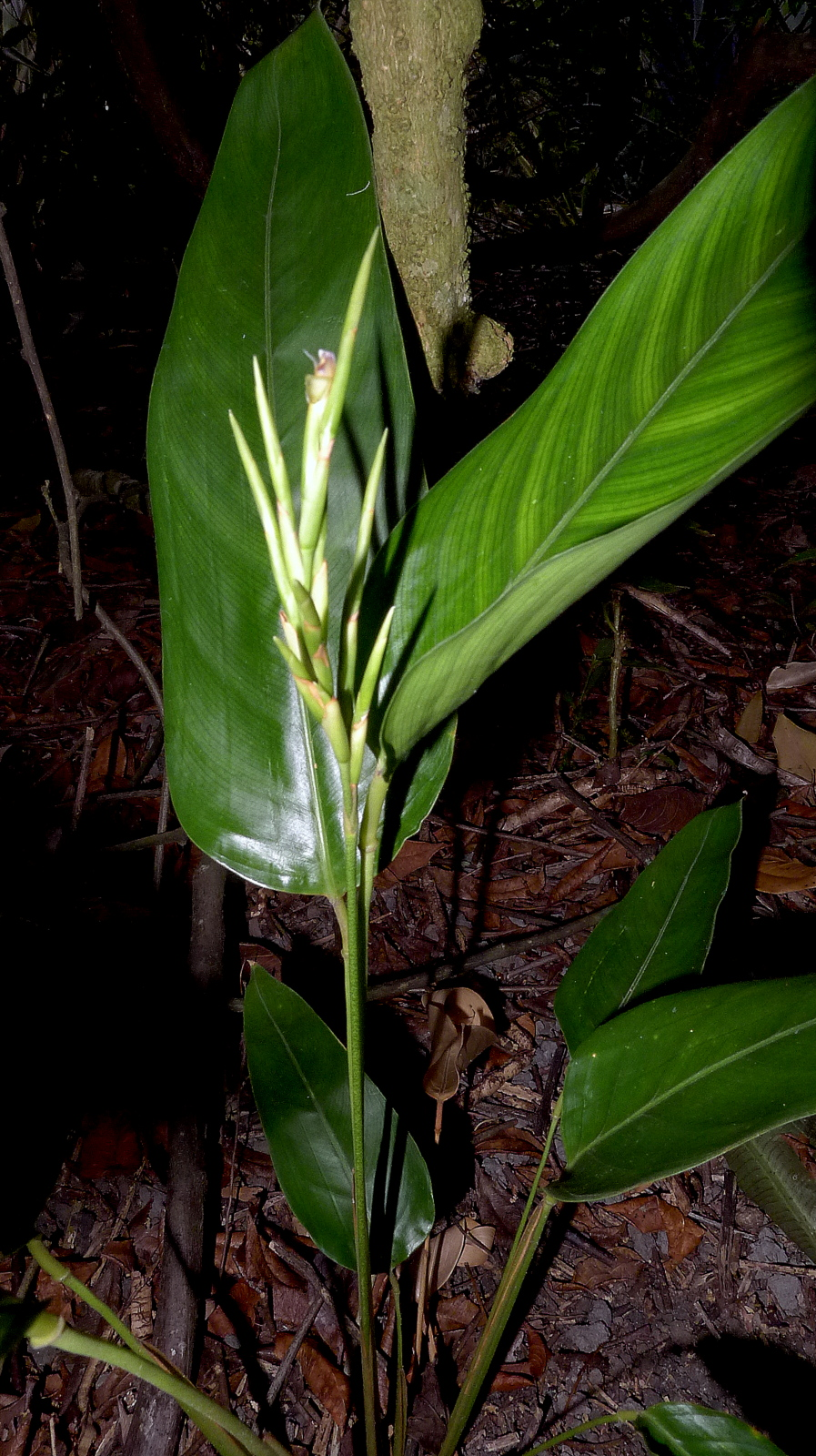

Scientific classification
- Kingdom: Plantae
- Clade: Tracheophytes
- Clade: Angiosperms
- Clade: Monocots
- Clade: Commelinids
- Order: Zingiberales
- Family: Marantaceae
- Genus: Monotagma
- Species: M. plurispicatum

Binomial name
- Monotagma plurispicatum (Körn.) K.Schum.

Synonyms
- Hymenocharis plurispicata (Körn.) Kuntze; Ischnosiphon plurispicatus Körn.

= Monotagma plurispicatum =

Species of flowering plant

Monotagma plurispicatum is a species of plant in the Marantaceae family. It is native to tropical South America and Central America.

Monotagma plurispicatum is morphologically similar to the other Monotagma species M. laxum K.Schum. and M. vaginatum Hagberg.

== Uses ==
Monotagma plurspicatum has demonstrated antimicrobial activity against Escherichia coli.
