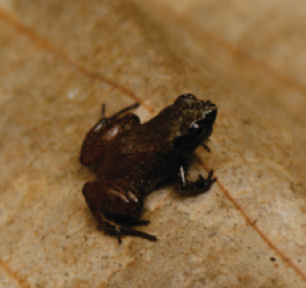

Conservation status
- Least Concern (IUCN 3.1)

Scientific classification
- Kingdom: Animalia
- Phylum: Chordata
- Class: Amphibia
- Order: Anura
- Family: Eleutherodactylidae
- Genus: Adelophryne
- Species: A. gutturosa

Binomial name
- Adelophryne gutturosa Hoogmoed and Lescure, 1984

= Adelophryne gutturosa =

Species of amphibian

Adelophryne gutturosa (common name: Guiana Shield frog) is a species of frogs in the family Eleutherodactylidae. It is found on the Guiana Shield from eastern Venezuela through Guyana to French Guiana and adjacent Brazil (Amapá), possibly extending to Suriname. Its type locality is Mount Roraima. Its local Spanish name is ranita guturosa.

== Taxonomy ==
Recent molecular research suggests that A. gutturosa consists of more than one species.

== Description ==
Adult males measure 12.4–14.7 mm (0.49–0.58 in) and females 12.6–16 mm (0.50–0.63 in) in snout–vent length. The snout is truncate. The head is slightly wider than the body. The tympanum is small but distinct. The canthus rostralis is indistinct. Females have a horizontal supra-tympanic fold. The fingers have asymmetrically pointed tips but no discs, whereas the toe tips have grooved, asymmetrically pointed discs. Skin is smooth. The dorsum is light brown and flanks are black. Males have large subgular vocal sac.

== Habitat and conservation ==
Adelophryne gutturosa occurs in the leaf-litter on the forest floor of rainforests near streams at elevations of 40–2,200 m (130–7,220 ft) above sea level. Males call from the base of plants (often formations of Monotagma spicatum), hidden among rootlets and dead leaves.

This species is not common, although its secretive habits also make it difficult to find. No significant threats to it have been identified, and its range includes several national parks.
