= Polymeridium =

Scientific classification
- Kingdom: Fungi
- Division: Ascomycota
- Class: Dothideomycetes
- Order: Trypetheliales
- Family: Trypetheliaceae
- Genus: Polymeridium (Müll.Arg.) R.C.Harris (1980)

Type species
- Polymeridium contendens (Nyl.) R.C.Harris

Synonyms
- Arthopyrenia sect. Polymeridium Müll.Arg. (1883); Exiliseptum R.C.Harris (1986)

Genus of lichens

Polymeridium is a genus of lichen-forming fungi in the family Trypetheliaceae. Species in the genus are corticolous (bark-dwelling) and typically occur in tropical areas.

== Taxonomy ==
The genus was originally circumscribed as a section of the genus Arthopyrenia by Swiss lichenologist Johannes Müller Argoviensis in 1883. Richard Harris elevated it to generic status in 1980. In his 1993 revision of the genus, Harris identified 19 species. Utilizing a broad species concept, he acknowledged the presence of variations in chemistry and hamathecial inspersion within individual species. André Aptroot and Marcela Cáceres again revised the genus in 2014, using the absence or presence of lichexanthone and the absence or presence of hamathecial inspersion as distinguishing characters for species. The monotypic genus Exiliseptum was incorporated into Polymeridium, as it only differs in one characteristic from several Polymeridium species and does not possess any unique features. As a result of this work, the number of species in the genus increased from 27 to 53.

== Description ==
Polymeridium is characterized by a white to yellowish or grey thallus, which is usually ecorticate (i.e., it lacks a cortex). Its ascomata, the fruiting bodies of the lichen, are simple or fused, appearing as black, spherical to pyriform structures that emerge from the substratum. The ostiole, or opening of the ascomata, can be apical to lateral, brown to black, or exhibit a red anthraquinone colour.

The hamathecium, which refers to the filamentous tissue within the ascomata, is colourless and may contain hyaline or red oil droplets that turn green when treated with potassium hydroxide (KOH) solution. Ascospores are the reproductive spores of the lichen and typically occur in groups of 4 to 8 per ascus. They are colourless, ellipsoid to fusiform in shape, with rounded to subacute ends, and symmetrically 3 to 13-septate to muriform. The ascospores are not constricted at the septa and are sometimes surrounded by a thin to 2–5 μm-thick gelatinous sheath. The septa within the ascospores are not thickened, and the lumina are rectangular and slightly rounded, but not diamond-shaped.

Conidiomata, or structures that produce conidia (asexual spores), are rather rare in the genus Polymeridium. In terms of secondary chemistry, the thallus occasionally contains lichexanthone, while anthraquinones are rarely present in the ostiole or hamathecium.

== Species ==
- Polymeridium albidoreagens Aptroot, A.A.Menezes & M.Cáceres (2013)
- Polymeridium albidovarians Aptroot (2013)
- Polymeridium albidum (Müll.Arg.) R.C.Harris (1986)
- Polymeridium albocinereum (Kremp.) R.C.Harris (1993)
- Polymeridium alboflavescens Aptroot (2013)
- Polymeridium albopruinosum (Makhija & Patw.) Aptroot (2013)
- Polymeridium bambusicola Aptroot & L.I.Ferraro (2000) – Argentina
- Polymeridium bengoanum (Vain.) Aptroot (2013)
- Polymeridium brachysporum (Malme) Aptroot (2013)
- Polymeridium catapastoides Aptroot (2013)
- Polymeridium catapastum (Nyl.) R.C.Harris (1986)
- Polymeridium contendens (Nyl.) R.C.Harris (1980)
- Polymeridium corticatum A.A.Menezes, M.Cáceres & Aptroot (2013) – Brazil
- Polymeridium costaricense Aptroot (2013)
- Polymeridium endoflavens Aptroot, D.S.Andrade & M.Cáceres (2016) – Brazil
- Polymeridium fernandoi Aptroot & Weerakoon (2018) – Sri Lanka
- Polymeridium inspersum Aptroot (2013)
- Polymeridium jordanii (C.W.Dodge) Aptroot (2013)
- Polymeridium julelloides E.L.Lima, M.Cáceres & Aptroot (2013) – Brazil
- Polymeridium longiflavens Aptroot, C.Mendonça & M.Cáceres (2016) – Brazil
- Polymeridium microsporum (Makhija & Patw.) Aptroot (2013)
- Polymeridium multiforme Aptroot (2013)
- Polymeridium multiseptatum Aptroot, A.A.Menezes & M.Cáceres (2013)
- Polymeridium neuwirthii Aptroot (2013)
- Polymeridium ocellatum (Müll.Arg.) Aptroot (2013)
- Polymeridium pyrenastroides R.C.Harris ex Aptroot (2013)
- Polymeridium pyrenuloides (Fée) Aptroot (2013)
- Polymeridium quinqueseptatum (Nyl.) R.C.Harris (1980)
- Polymeridium refertum (Stirt.) Aptroot (2013)
- Polymeridium rhodopruinosum Aptroot (2016) – Puerto Rico
- Polymeridium siamense (Vain.) Aptroot (2013)
- Polymeridium stramineoatrum (Vain.) Aptroot (2013)
- Polymeridium submuriforme Aptroot (2013)
- Polymeridium subvirescens (Leight.) Aptroot (2013)
- Polymeridium suffusum (C.Knight) Aptroot (2013)
- Polymeridium sulphurescens (Müll.Arg.) R.C.Harris (1998)
- Polymeridium tribulationis Aptroot (2013)
- Polymeridium xanthoexcentricum Flakus & Aptroot (2016) – Bolivia
- Polymeridium xanthopleurothecium Aptroot & Etayo (2017) – Panama
- Polymeridium xanthoreagens Aptroot (2013)
