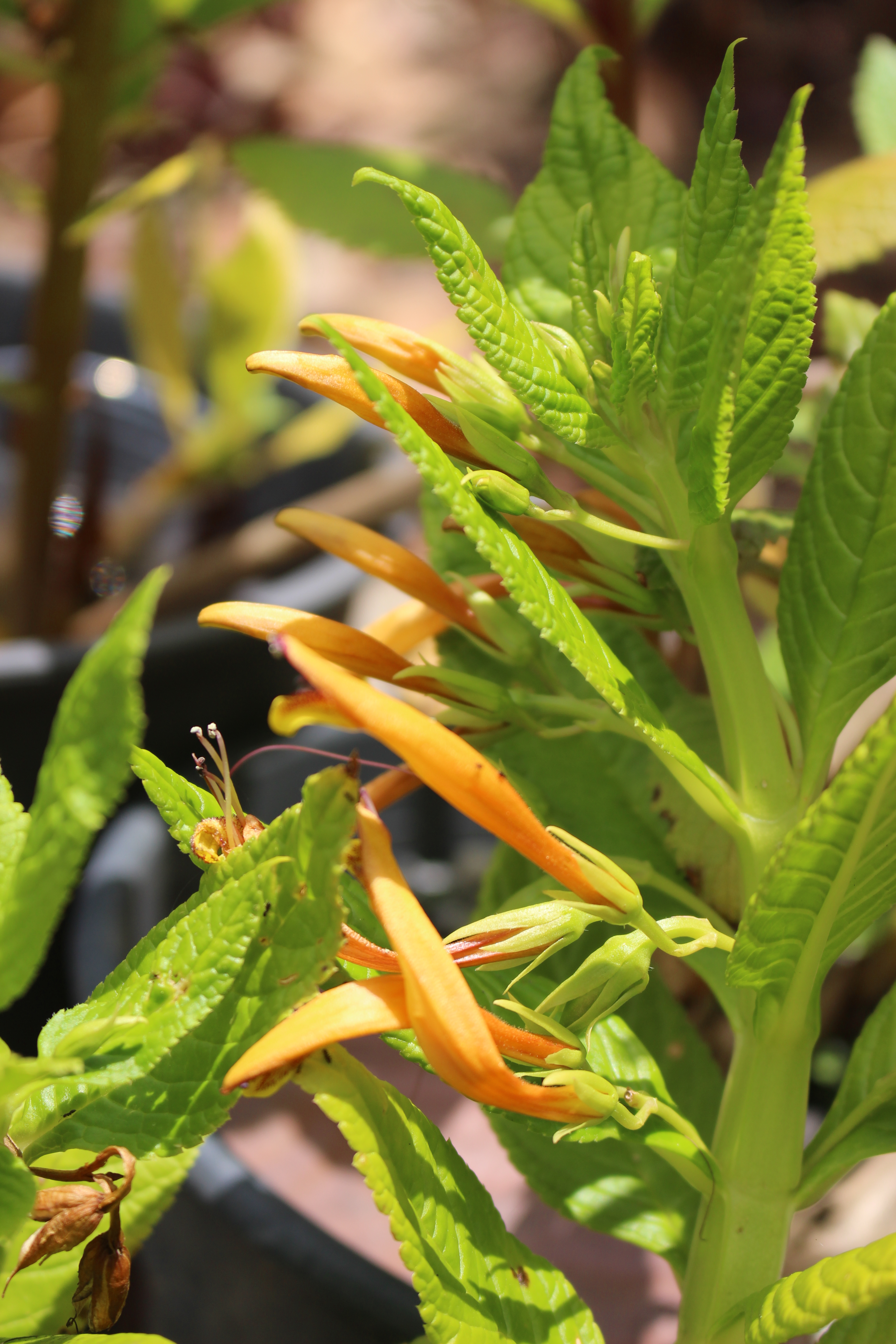
- Ameroglossum sp. in Paraiba, Brazil

Scientific classification
- Kingdom: Plantae
- Clade: Tracheophytes
- Clade: Angiosperms
- Clade: Eudicots
- Clade: Asterids
- Order: Lamiales
- Family: Scrophulariaceae
- Genus: Ameroglossum; Eb.Fisch, S.Vogel & A.V.Lopes (1999)

species
- 9; see text

= Ameroglossum =

Species of plant

Ameroglossum is a genus of flowering plants in the family Scrophulariaceae. It includes nine species native to northeastern Brazil, where they grow in moist forest enclaves on the region's mountains and plateaus.

Ameroglossum pernambucense is endemic to the Borborema Plateau in Pernambuco, and Ameroglossum manoel-felixii is found in Paraíba. The species are threatened by drought, fires, quarrying, trampling and cattle pasturing.

== Species ==
Nine species are accepted.

- Ameroglossum alatum E.M.Almeida, A.M.Wanderley & L.P.Felix
- Ameroglossum asperifolium E.M.Almeida, J.M.P.Cordeiro & L.P.Felix
- Ameroglossum bicolor E.M.Almeida, A.M.Wanderley & L.P.Felix
- Ameroglossum fulniorum E.M.Almeida, A.M.Wanderley & L.P.Felix
- Ameroglossum genaroanum E.M.Almeida, J.M.P.Cordeiro & L.P.Felix
- Ameroglossum intermedium E.M.Almeida, A.M.Wanderley & L.P.Felix
- Ameroglossum manoel-felixii L.P.Félix & E.M.Almeida
- Ameroglossum pernambucense Eb.Fisch., S.Vogel & A.V.Lopes
- Ameroglossum xukuruorum E.M.Almeida, Christenh. & L.P.Felix
