= Adelophryne adiastola =

Conservation status
- Least Concern (IUCN 3.1)

Scientific classification
- Kingdom: Animalia
- Phylum: Chordata
- Class: Amphibia
- Order: Anura
- Family: Eleutherodactylidae
- Genus: Adelophryne
- Species: A. adiastola

Binomial name
- Adelophryne adiastola Hoogmoed and Lescure, 1984

Species of amphibian

Adelophryne adiastola (common names: Yapima Shield frog, Yapima little hammer frog) is a species of frog in the family Eleutherodactylidae. It is found in the Amazon Basin in Colombia (Amazonas and Vaupés Departments), Ecuador (Pastaza Province), Peru, and western Brazil.

== Description ==
Adelophryne adiastola are tiny frogs: based on the type series consisting of three males and a female, males measure 13–13.7 mm (0.51–0.54 in) and the female 13.9 mm (0.55 in) in snout–vent length. The head is longer than it is wide, and slightly wider than the body. Dorsal skin is shagreened to granular. The snout is rounded. The tympanum is small but distinct. The fingers and toes are depressed. Finger tips have no discs but have asymmetrically pointed tips. The toes have circumferentially grooved, asymmetrically pointed discs. There is neither webbing nor lateral fringes. Adult males have a large, subgular vocal sac.

== Habitat and conservation ==
Adelophryne adiastola is a terrestrial frog inhabiting primary and secondary lowland tropical moist forests at elevations up to 300 m (980 ft) above sea level. The female paratype had ingested a small harvestman of the family Sironidae.

The species is common in Colombia. It is locally impacted by habitat loss, but its range is in an area of generally low human impact.
