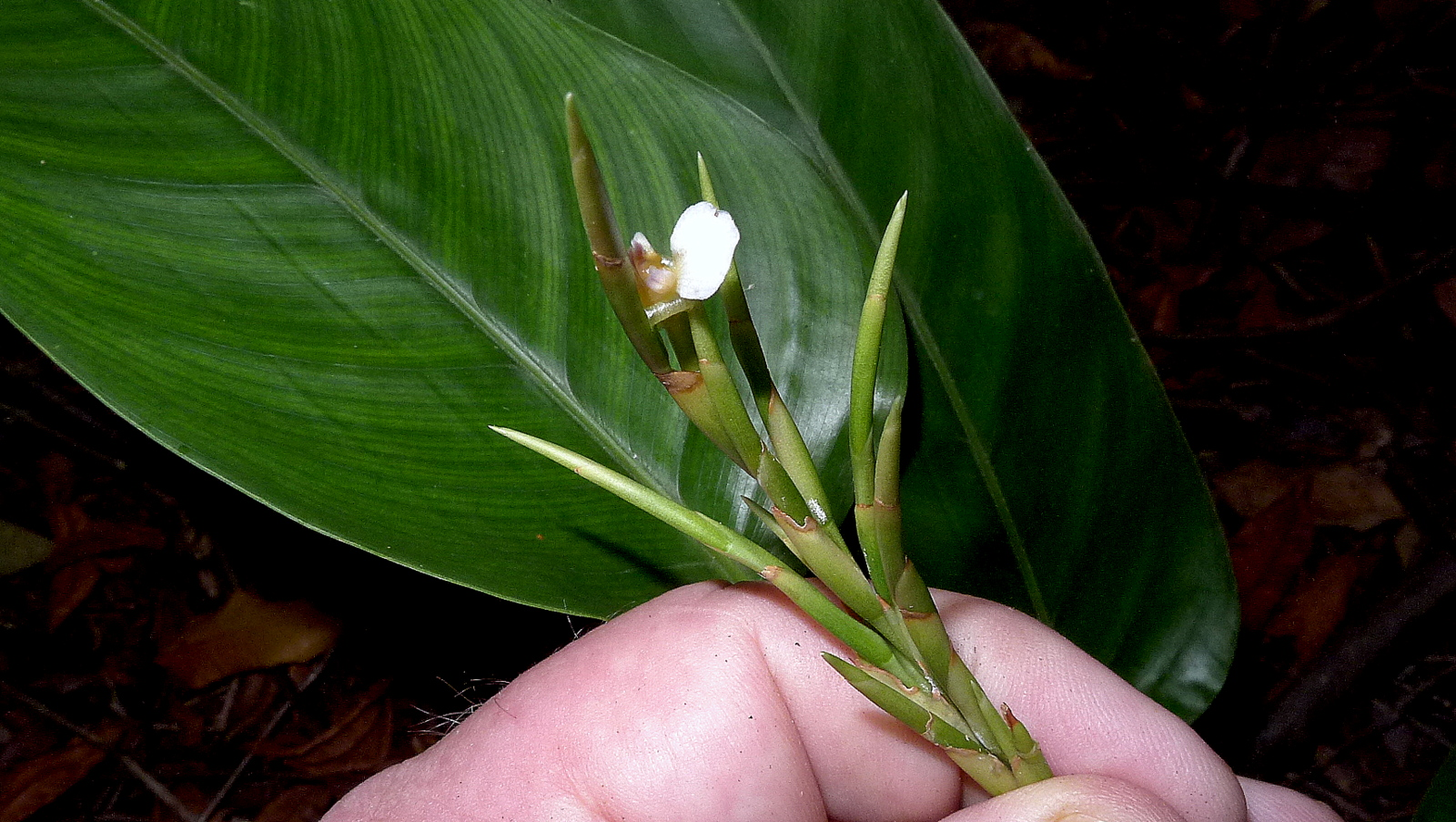
- Monotagma plurispicatum

Scientific classification
- Kingdom: Plantae
- Clade: Tracheophytes
- Clade: Angiosperms
- Clade: Monocots
- Clade: Commelinids
- Order: Zingiberales
- Family: Marantaceae
- Genus: Monotagma; K.Schum.

= Monotagma =

Genus of flowering plants

Monotagma is a genus of plant in family Marantaceae described as a genus in 1902. It is native to tropical America.

Species

- Monotagma anathronum J.F.Macbr. - Peru
- Monotagma angustissimum Loes. - Peru, NW Brazil
- Monotagma aurantispathum Hagberg & R.Erikss. - Peru, NW Brazil
- Monotagma breviscapum Hagberg & R.Erikss. - NW Brazil
- Monotagma congestum Hagberg & R.Erikss. NW Brazil
- Monotagma contractum Huber - Suriname, Fr Guiana, N Brazil
- Monotagma contrariosum J.F.Macbr. - Loreto
- Monotagma densiflorum (Körn.) K.Schum. - N Brazil
- Monotagma dolosum J.F.Macbr. - Peru
- Monotagma exile Hagberg & R.Erikss. - N Brazil
- Monotagma flavicomum Hagberg & R.Erikss. - Peru, NW Brazil
- Monotagma floribundum Hagberg & R.Erikss. - N Brazil
- Monotagma grallatum Hagberg & R.Erikss. - Bahia, Espírito Santo
- Monotagma haughtii L.B.Sm. & Idrobo - Colombia
- Monotagma humile Hagberg & R.Erikss. - N Brazil
- Monotagma juruanum Loes. - Suriname, Fr Guiana, N Brazil, Peru, Ecuador
- Monotagma laxum (Poepp. & Endl.) K.Schum. - trop South America
- Monotagma lilacinum Hagberg & R.Erikss. - N Brazil
- Monotagma nutans Hagberg & R.Erikss. - Peru, Bolivia
- Monotagma ovatum Hagberg - Guyana, Bolívar
- Monotagma papillosum Hagberg & R.Erikss. - Venezuela
- Monotagma paradoxum Hagberg & R.Erikss. - Colombia, Peru
- Monotagma parvulum Loes. - Peru
- Monotagma plurispicatum (Körn.) K.Schum. - trop South + Central America
- Monotagma remotum Hagberg, R.Erikss. & H.Kenn. - Panama
- Monotagma rhodanthum Maguire & Wurdack - V Amazonas
- Monotagma roseum Hagberg & R.Erikss. - Pará
- Monotagma rudanii Hagberg - Ecuador
- Monotagma secundum (Petersen) K.Schum. - trop South America
- Monotagma septentrionale Hagberg & R.Erikss. - Venezuela
- Monotagma smaragdinum (Linden & André) K.Schum. - Colombia, Peru
- Monotagma spathulatum Hagberg & R.Erikss. - Peru
- Monotagma spicatum (Aubl.) J.F.Macbr. - Trinidad, trop South America
- Monotagma tomentosum K.Schum. ex Loes. - S Venezuela, Brazil, Peru
- Monotagma tuberosum Hagberg & R.Erikss. - Peru, Bolivia, N Brazil
- Monotagma ulei K.Schum. ex Loes. - Fr Guiana, N Brazil
- Monotagma uliginosum Hagberg & R.Erikss. - Peru
- Monotagma vaginatum Hagberg - Fr Guiana, N Brazil, Venezuela, Peru
- Monotagma yapacanensis Steyerm. & Bunting - V Amazonas
