= Ibiapina =

Municipality in Ceará, Brazil

Coordinates: 3.92278°S 40.8889°W

- Municipality
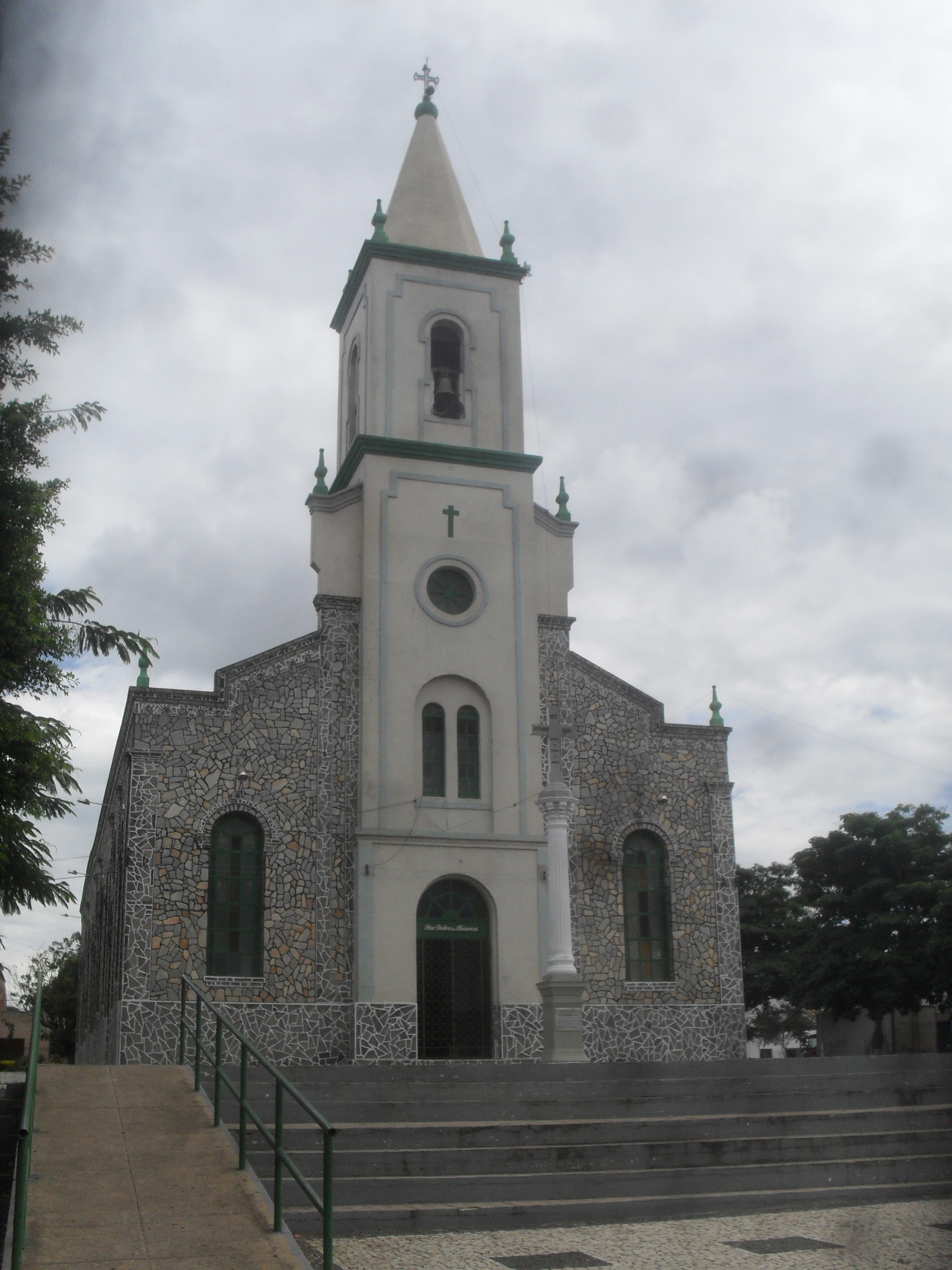

- Flag Coat of arms
- Interactive map of Ibiapina
- Country: Brazil
- Region: Nordeste
- State: Ceará
- Mesoregion: Noroeste Cearense

Population (2020)
  - Total: 25,082
- Time zone: UTC−3 (BRT)

Ibiapina is a municipality in the state of Ceará in the Northeast region of Brazil.

== See also ==
- List of municipalities in Ceará
