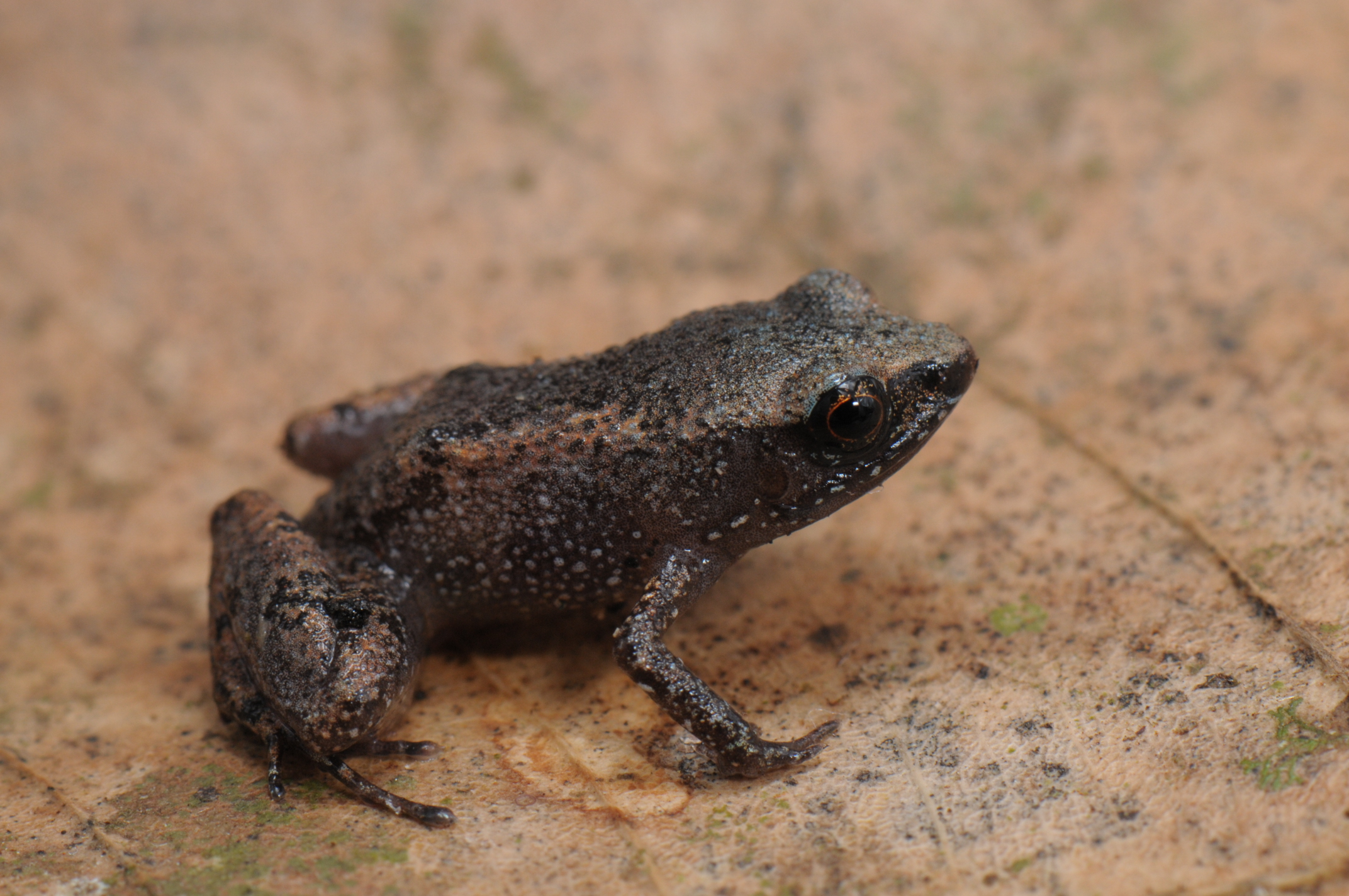

Scientific classification
- Domain: Eukaryota
- Kingdom: Animalia
- Phylum: Chordata
- Class: Amphibia
- Order: Anura
- Family: Eleutherodactylidae
- Genus: Adelophryne
- Species: A. mucronatus

Binomial name
- Adelophryne mucronatus Lourenço-de-Moraes, Solé, and Toledo, 2012

= Adelophryne mucronatus =

Species of frog

Adelophryne mucronatus is a species of frog in the family Eleutherodactylidae. It is endemic to the coastal areas of the Bahia state in eastern Brazil; it is known from the municipalities of Itacaré, Ilhéus, and Una. The specific name mucronatus is derived from Latin and means "pointed", referring to the pointed fingers tips of this frog.

== Description ==
Adult males measure 11.6–12.4 mm (0.5–0.5 in) and adult females 13.6–14.9 mm (0.5–0.6 in) in snout–vent length. The snout is rounded. The tympanum is small but distinct, including a complete annulus. The canthus rostralis is indistinct. The fingers have no webbing nor discs, but they have pointed tips. The toes have no webbing but have pointed tips; toes III and IV bear discs. Skin is smooth with scattered small granules. The dorsal coloration varies from reddish brown (with or without dark brown spots) to homogeneous bluish gray. There may be irregular dark patches, inter-orbital lines, or a mid-dorsal Y-like pattern. The iris is reddish brown to yellowish brown.

== Behavior ==
When approached, adult frogs exhibit a mouth-gaping behavior: the frog keeps it mouth open for about 15 seconds. This is interpreted as a defensive behavior. A specimen was observed feeding on ants using its tongue; this is in agreement with stomach content observations in other Adelophryne.

The male advertisement call consists of a single note lasting about 30 milliseconds. The dominant frequency is 5300 Hz. Calling males were observed from February to September, but greatest activity was from June onward. Females were found with few (2 or 3) but large eggs in their ovaries.

== Habitat and conservation ==
Adelophryne mucronatus occurs in shaded areas of primary and disturbed forests at elevations of 79–126 m (259–413 ft) above sea level. It lives under dense leaf litter. Males call between late afternoon and midnight from the ground beneath fallen, wet leaves, or from beneath leaves of terrestrial bromeliads.

The species is known from three localities. While it also occurs in disturbed forests, it is more abundant and the breeding season is longer in pristine ones. It is threatened by deforestation.
