= Ubajara =

Municipality in Ceará, Brazil

Coordinates: 3°51′S 40°56′W

- Municipality
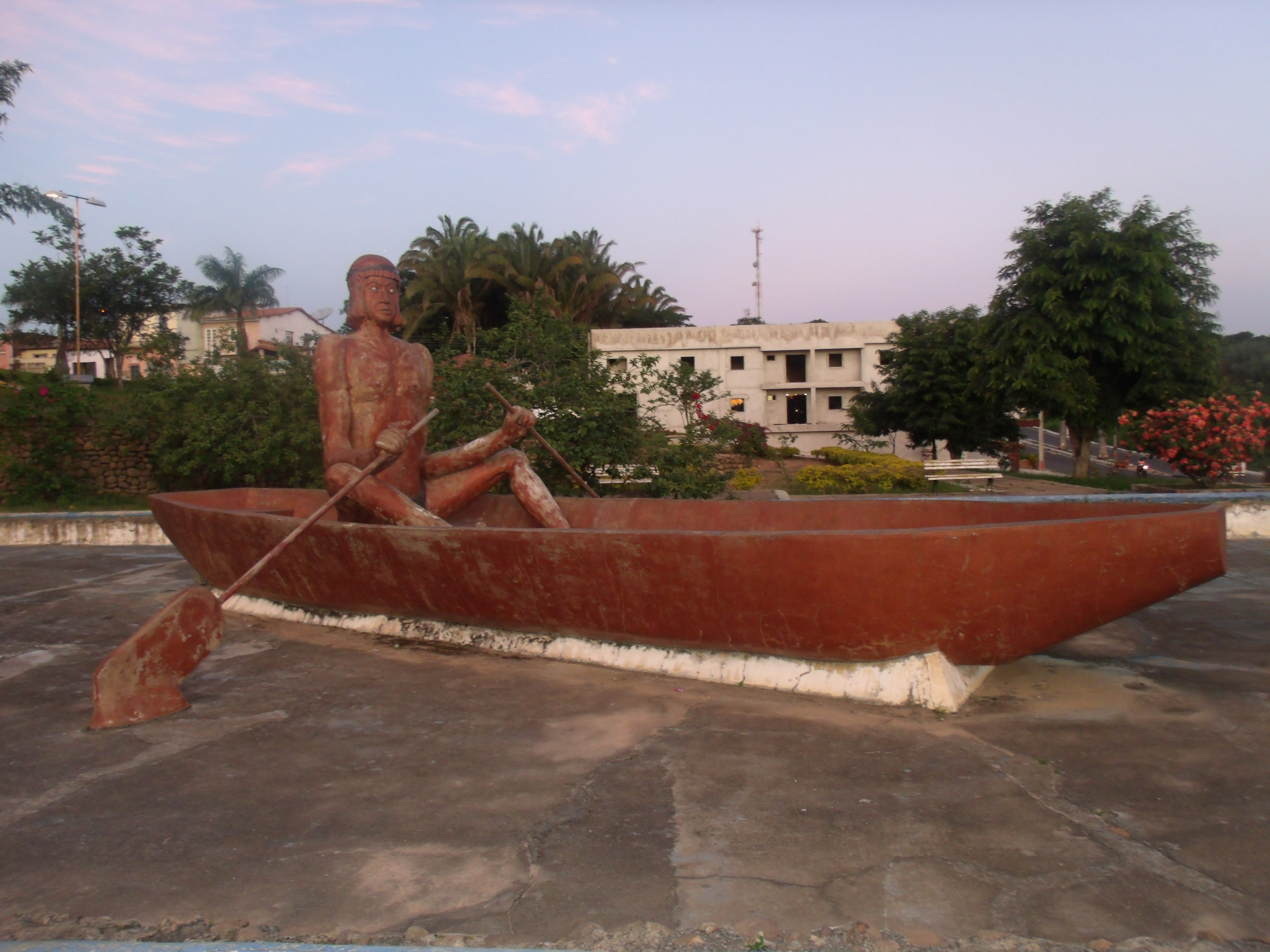

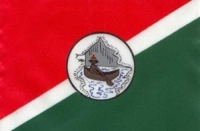
- Flag
- Interactive map of Ubajara
- Country: Brazil
- Region: Nordeste
- State: Ceará
- Mesoregion: Noroeste Cearense

Population (2020)
  - Total: 35,047
- Time zone: UTC−3 (BRT)

Ubajara is a municipality in the state of Ceará in the Northeast region of Brazil.

In this municipality is located the Ubajara National Park.

== See also ==
- List of municipalities in Ceará
