= Tianguá =

Municipality in Ceará, Brazil

Coordinates: 3°44′S 40°59′W

- Municipality
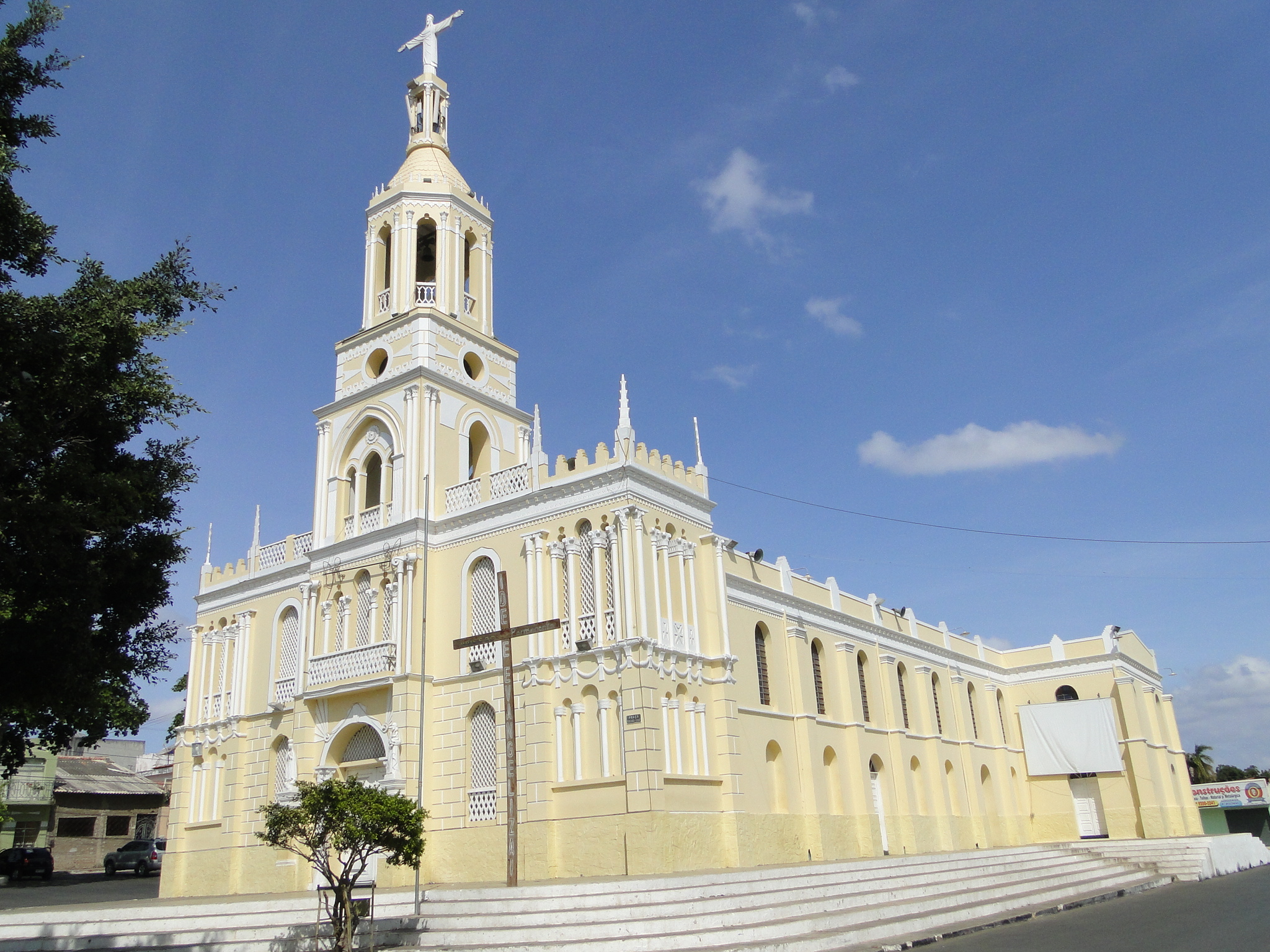
- Cathedral of Senhora Santana

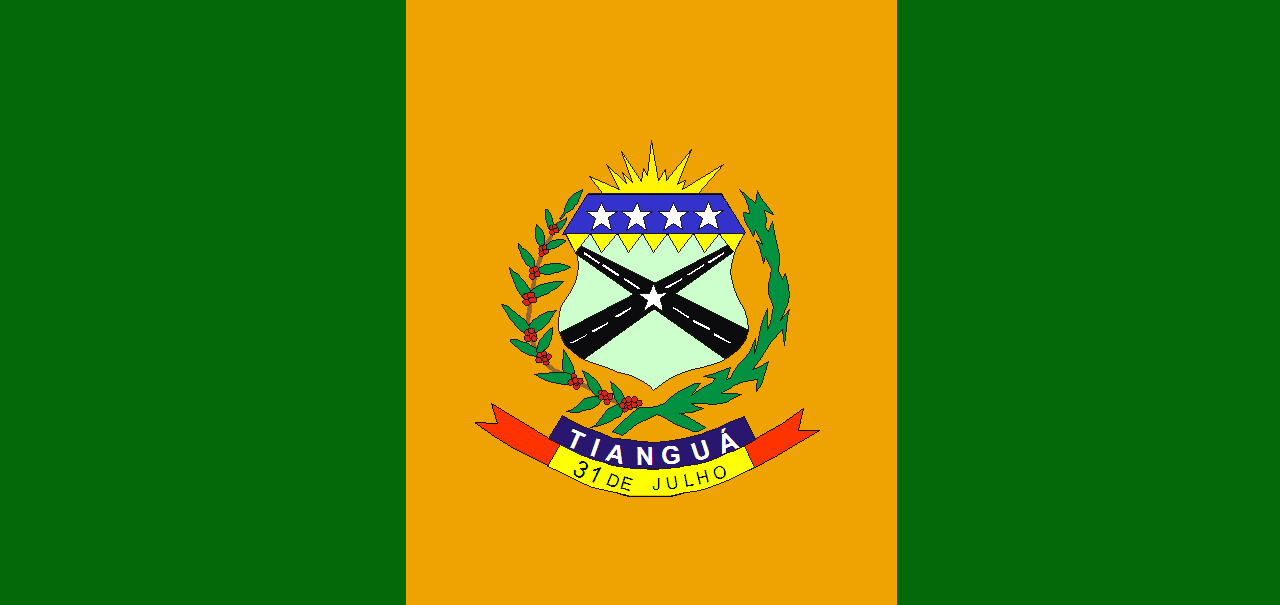
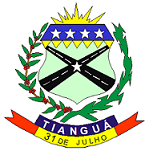
- Flag Coat of arms
- Nickname: "A capital da Ibiapaba" ("The capital of Ibiapaba")
- Interactive map of Tianguá
- Country: Brazil
- Region: Nordeste
- State: Ceará
- Mesoregion: Noroeste Cearense

Population (2020)
  - Total: 76,537
- Time zone: UTC−3 (BRT)

Tianguá is a municipality in the state of Ceará in the Northeast region of Brazil.

The municipality contains part of the 1,592,550 hectares (3,935,300 acres) Serra da Ibiapaba Environmental Protection Area, created in 1996. Currently is governed by Mayor Luiz Menezes de Lima.

== Toponymy ==
The toponym "Tianguá", according to the book "Tianguá ... Roots of its history and culture", page 99, is a Portuguese term from the Tupi words "Tyanha" (hook) and "Guaba" (water), which that is to say: the hook that holds the waters, alluding to the Tianguá River (a stream that runs south of the city) and its tributaries.

== History ==
The town of Tianguá was elevated to the category of city in 1938, through Decree-Law No. 448 of September 20 of that year.

== Geography ==
The municipality of Tianguá is divided into three distinct areas: cuesta, carrasco and sertão.

== See also ==
- List of municipalities in Ceará
