= Adelophryne maranguapensis =

Conservation status
- Critically Endangered (IUCN 3.1)

Scientific classification
- Kingdom: Animalia
- Phylum: Chordata
- Class: Amphibia
- Order: Anura
- Family: Eleutherodactylidae
- Genus: Adelophryne
- Species: A. maranguapensis

Binomial name
- Adelophryne maranguapensis Hoogmoed, Borges, and Cascon, 1994
- Range in northeastern Brazil

Species of frog

Adelophryne maranguapensis is a species of frog in the family Eleutherodactylidae. It is endemic to Serra de Maranguape, just west of Fortaleza, in Ceará state, northeastern Brazil.

== Description ==
Based on the type series including two adult males and a single adult female, adult males measure 12–13 mm (0.5–0.5 in) and adult females 17 mm (0.7 in) in snout–vent length. The head is longer than it is wide. The snout is truncate in dorsal view and pointed in profile, slightly projecting beyond the mouth. The tympanum is distinct in most specimens. There is no supra-tympanic fold and the canthus rostralis is indistinct. The fingers have no webbing and have small discs; only the third finger has discs that is distinctly wider than the adjacent phalange. The toes have no webbing either but the discs are more distinct than those on the fingers. Skin is smooth. The dorsal coloration is dark to reddish brown with an hourglass like central pattern. There is a dark brown lateral band. The limbs are crossbanded. The lower parts are light brown to beige.

== Reproduction ==
The male advertisement call consists of 5–8 multi-pulse notes with a dominant frequency around 4800 Hz; the calling males were observed in March, during the rainy season in Serra de Maranguape.

The female measuring 17 mm had four large eggs. Egg clutches have been found in bromeliad leaf axils 0.5–4.4 m (2–14 ft) above the ground. The clutches were wound above the water accumulated in the axils. Clutch size varied between three and eight; it is possible that the clutches may represent more than one female; the different developmental stages seen in one clutch at least shows that the eggs were not deposited at the same time. Development is direct, with the eggs hatching directly into froglets measuring 4.5 mm (0.2 in).

== Habitat and conservation ==
Adelophryne maranguapensis occurs in the Atlantic Forest of Serra de Maranguape at elevations of 800–920 m (2,620–3,020 ft) above sea level. It is known from both primary and secondary forest and even bamboo and banana plantations, but not open habitats. It is a diurnal leaf-litter species but can also be found in bromeliads above the ground. It is threatened by habitat loss caused by logging, agriculture, and human settlement, and by collection of bromeliads for sale.
