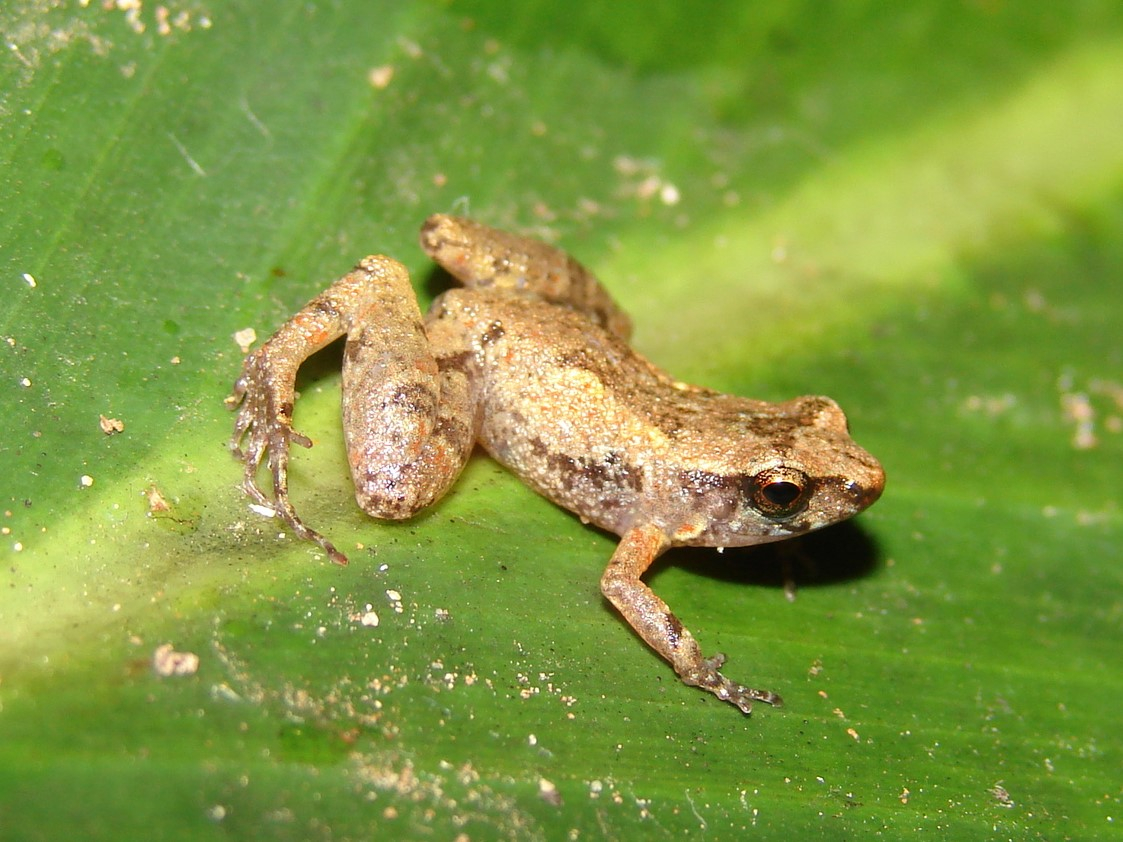

Conservation status
- Vulnerable (IUCN 3.1)

Scientific classification
- Kingdom: Animalia
- Phylum: Chordata
- Class: Amphibia
- Order: Anura
- Clade: Brachycephaloidea
- Family: Eleutherodactylidae
- Genus: Adelophryne
- Species: A. baturitensis

Binomial name
- Adelophryne baturitensis Hoogmoed, Borges, and Cascon, 1994

= Adelophryne baturitensis =

Species of frog

Adelophryne baturitensis is a species of frog in the family Eleutherodactylidae. It is endemic to north-eastern Brazil and is known from its type locality, Serra de Baturité (or Maçico de Baturité) in the state of Ceará.

== Description ==
Adult males measure 12–13 mm (0.5–0.5 in) and adult females 12–16 mm (0.5–0.6 in) in snout–vent length. The head is longer than it is wide. The snout is truncate in dorsal view and rounded in profile. The tympanum is small but distinct. There is no supra-tympanic fold and the canthus rostralis is indistinct. The fingers have no webbing and only the fingers III–IV have small discs. The toes have no webbing but have small discs. The skin is smooth. The dorsal coloration is brown; there is a darker pattern starting from between the eyes. The snout and the sides are brown. There is a dark brown band running from the snout to the sides and tapering towards the groin. The limbs have cross-bands. The iris is gold.

== Habitat and conservation ==
Adelophryne baturitensis is a diurnal leaf-litter species that can be locally common; it can be found in dry or moist leaf-litter on the ground, in bromeliads, and stream margins in reasonably well-preserved closed forests, but also surviving in shaded coffee plantations, at elevations of 600–1,000 m (2,000–3,300 ft) above sea level. The Pernambuco locality is an Atlantic Rainforest remnant.

The species is threatened by habitat loss caused by logging, agriculture, and human settlement; it occurs in areas of good soil and climate, favoring agricultural expansion.
