= Chapada do Araripe =

Plateau in northeastern Brazil

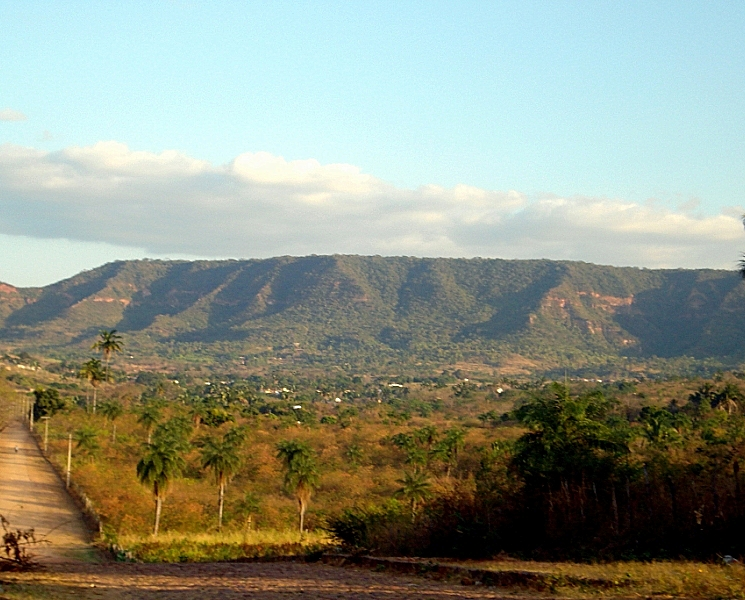

Geography
- Location within Brazil
- Country: Brazil
- States: Ceara, Pernambuco
- Range coordinates: 7°22′S 39°58′W

The Chapada do Araripe, also known as the Serra do Araripe, is a chapada (plateau) in northeastern Brazil. The chapada forms the boundary of Ceará and Pernambuco states, and forms the watershed between the Jaguaribe River of Ceará, which flows northward into the Atlantic, and the much larger basin of the São Francisco River of Pernambuco and neighboring states, which drains eastward into the Atlantic. The Santana Formation, which is rich with fossils from the early Cretaceous, lies at the base of the chapada.

== Ecology ==
The landscape surrounding the Chapada is mostly Caatinga, a semi-arid shrubland and savanna that covers most of northeastern Brazil's interior.

On the Chapada's northeastern slope is an enclave of tropical moist forest. Rainfall here exceeds 1000 mm annually, and the landscape is lush and green in contrast to the surrounding Caatinga. This moist forest enclave includes several forest types, mostly Atlantic semi-deciduous moist forest composed of four distinct layers. Emergent trees grow more than 30 m tall, above a canopy layer where species of legumes, mahogany, and family Apocynaceae predominate. The moist forests are mostly similar in composition to the Atlantic Forest, with some elements from the Amazon and Cerrado. Other plateau plant communities include dry forest and Cerrado subhumid savanna. Characteristic species include pequizeiro (Caryocar coriaceum) and faveira or visgueiro (Parkia platycephala) in the Cerrado, and jatobá (Hymenaea courbaril) and pau-d’arco or ipê-amarelo (Handroanthus serratifolius) in the humid forest. The Araripe manakin (Antilophia bokermanni), a bird only described in 1998, is endemic to the Chapada do Araripe.

Araripe-Apodi National Forest (Floresta Nacional Do Araripe-Apodi), the first national forest in Brazil, was established in 1946 to protect the moist forest enclave. It covers an area of 389.19 km^{2}.

== Etymology ==
The word "Araripe" stems from the Tupi word ararype, meaning "macaw at the river" (arara, macaw + 'y, river + pe, at).
