= Aracoiaba, Ceará =

Municipality in Ceará, Brazil

Coordinates: 4°22′15″S 38°48′50″W

Aracoiaba
- Municipality
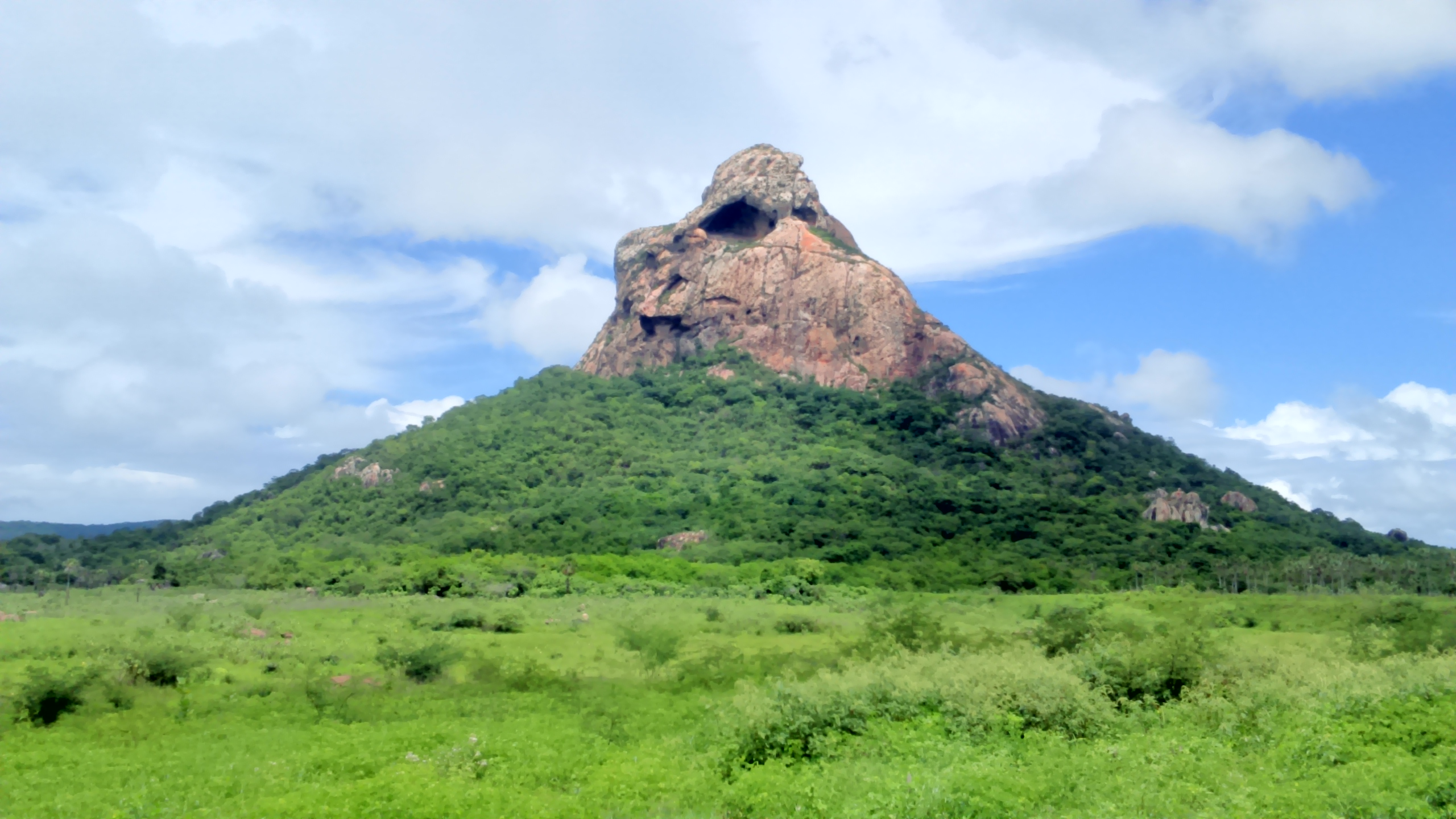

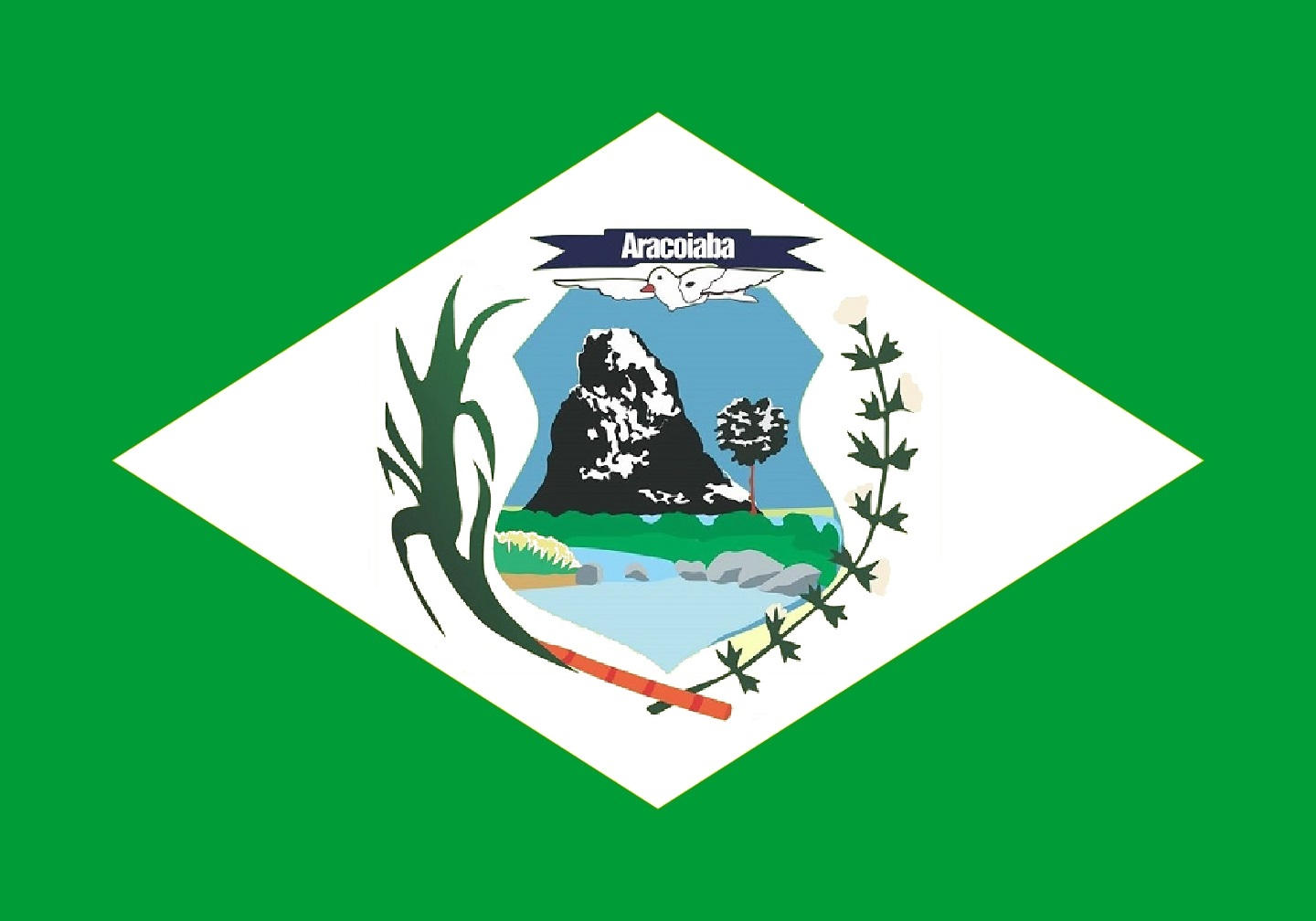
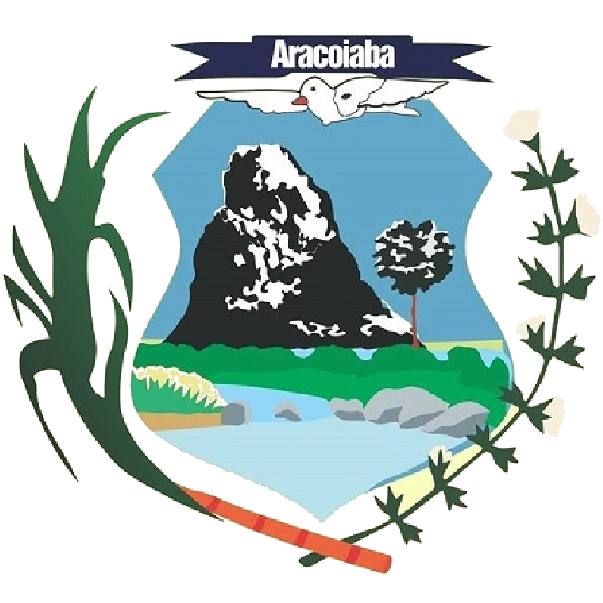
- Flag Coat of arms
- Interactive map of Aracoiaba
- Country: Brazil
- Region: Northeast
- State: Ceará
- Immediate: Redenção-Acarape

Area
  - Total: 248,645 sq mi (643,988 km^{2})

Population (2022)
  - Total: 25,553
- Time zone: UTC−3 (BRT)

Aracoiaba is a municipality in the state of Ceará in the Northeast Region of Brazil. With an area of 643.988 square kilometers (248.645 sq mi), of which 6.6403 square kilometres (2.5638 sq mi) is urban, it is located 79 km from Fortaleza, the state capital, and 1,613 km from Brasília, the federal capital. Its population in the 2022 demographic census was 25,553 inhabitants, according to the Brazilian Institute of Geography and Statistics (IBGE), ranking as the 74th most populous municipality in the state of Ceará.

== Geography ==
The territory of Aracoiaba covers 643.988 square kilometers (248.645 sq mi), of which 6.6403 square kilometres (2.5638 sq mi) constitutes the urban area. It sits at an average altitude of 102 meters above sea level. Aracoiaba borders these municipalities: to the north, Baturité, Redenção and Barreira; to the south, Ibaretama; to the east, Ocara; and to the west, Baturité again. These lands were granted to the captain-major in 1735, who settled there and prospered, attracting other residents to the region. The city is located 79 km from the state capital Fortaleza, and 1,613 km from the federal capital Brasília.

Under the territorial division established in 2017 by the Brazilian Institute of Geography and Statistics (IBGE), the municipality belongs to the immediate geographical region of Redenção-Acarape, within the intermediate region of Fortaleza. Previously, under the microregion and mesoregion divisions, it was part of the microregion of Baturité in the mesoregion of Norte Cearense.

== Demographics ==
In the 2022 census, the municipality had a population of 25,553 inhabitants (54.1% living in the urban area), the municipality ranked only 74th in the state that year, with 50.18% female and 49.82% male, resulting in a sex ratio of 99.27 (9,927 men for every 10,000 women), compared to 25,391 inhabitants in the 2010 census, when it held the 75th state position. Between the censuses of 2010 and 2022, the population of Aracoiaba registered a growth of just over 0.6%, with an annual geometric growth rate of 0.07%. Regarding age group in the 2022 census, 67.5% of the inhabitants were between 15 and 64 years old, 20.9% were under fifteen, and 11.61% were 65 or older. The population density in 2022 was 39.68 inhabitants per square kilometer (eighty-ninth highest in Ceará), with an average of 3.01 inhabitants per household.

The municipality's Human Development Index (HDI-M) was considered medium, according to data from the United Nations Development Programme (UNDP). According to the 2010 report published in 2013, its value was 0.615, ranking 87th in the state (out of 184 municipalities) and 3,796th nationally (out of 5,565 municipalities), and the Gini coefficient rose from 0.41 in 2003 to 0.51 in 2010. Considering only the longevity index, its value is 0.759, the income index is 0.550, and the education index is 0.556.

== See also ==
- List of municipalities in Ceará
