= Barreira (disambiguation) =

Barreira or Barreiras (Portuguese meaning "barrier" and "barriers", respectively) might refer to:

== People ==
- Luís Barreira, a Portuguese mathematician

== Places ==
=== Brazil ===
- Barreira, Ceará
- Barreiras, Bahia
  - Barreiras Airport
- Barreiras do Piauí, Piauí

=== Portugal ===
- Barreiras, a village in Peral, Cadaval, Lisbon District

== Other uses ==
- Barreira do Inferno Launch Center, also referred to as Barreira do Inferno, a Brazilian rocket launch base
- Barreira Megalithic Complex, a Portuguese megalithic site
- Barreiras Formation or Barreiras Group, a geological formation along the Brazilian coast
