= Diogo Abreu =

Diogo Abreu may refer to:

- Diogo Abreu (geographer) (born 1947), Portuguese geographer
- Diogo Abreu (gymnast) (born 1993), Portuguese trampolinist
- Diogo Abreu (footballer) (born 2003), Portuguese footballer
