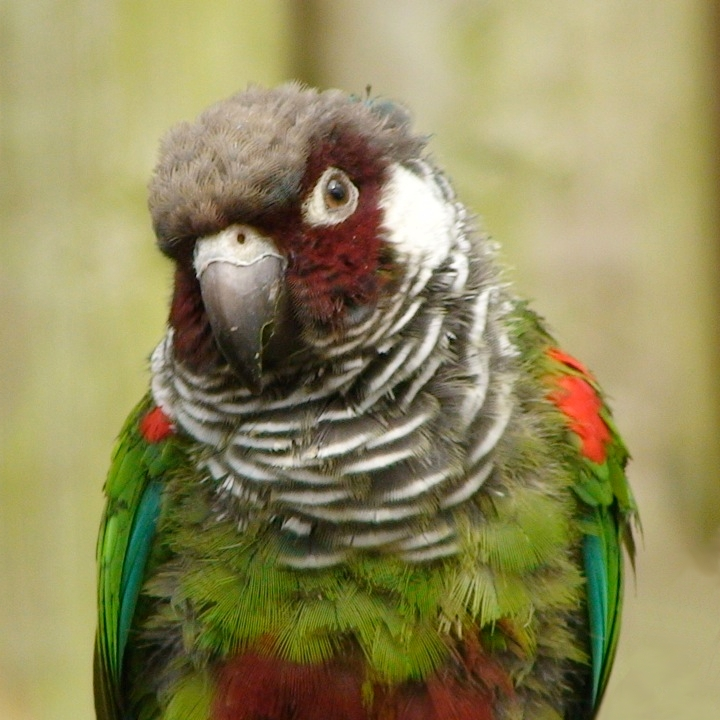

Conservation status
- Endangered (IUCN 3.1)
- CITES Appendix II

Scientific classification
- Kingdom: Animalia
- Phylum: Chordata
- Class: Aves
- Order: Psittaciformes
- Family: Psittacidae
- Genus: Pyrrhura
- Species: P. griseipectus

Binomial name
- Pyrrhura griseipectus Salvadori, 1900

Synonyms
- Pyrrhura leucotis griseipectus; Pyrrhura anaca

= Grey-breasted parakeet =

Species of bird

The grey-breasted parakeet (Pyrrhura griseipectus) is an Endangered species of bird in subfamily Arinae of the family Psittacidae, the African and New World parrots. Long thought to be endemic to Ceará in northeastern Brazil, it has also been documented in Bahia.

== Taxonomy and systematics ==
Until the early 2000s the grey-breasted parakeet was considered a subspecies of the white-eared parakeet (P. leucotis), which is also called maroon-faced parakeet. There is some thought that the specific epithet griseipectus should be replaced by anaca, which was originally applied to another parakeet, but which appears to have priority.

== Description ==
The grey-breasted parakeet is 20 to 23 cm (7.9 to 9.1 in) long. The sexes are the same. Adults have a brown crown, a plum-red face, and white ear coverts. Their upperparts are mostly green with a red-brown rump. Their chin, throat, and the sides of their neck are grayish with a scaly appearance. The center of their belly is red-brown and the rest of their underparts are green. Their wing is mostly green with a red shoulder and bluish flight feathers. Their tail is red-brown. Immatures are similar to adults.

== Distribution and habitat ==
As of 2020 the grey-breasted parakeet was known in only three sites in the Brazilian state of Ceará: Serra do Baturité, Quixadá, and Ibaretama. Its historical range included at least 15 locations in Ceará, Alagoas, Pernambuco, and Rio Grande do Norte. A 2022 publication documented a flock in Bahia, approximately 800 km (500 mi) south of the Ceará sites. It also identified earlier photographs taken in Bahia of birds that at the time were identified as the white-eared (or maroon-faced) parakeet. The Ceará population inhabits patches of tall humid forest within otherwise dry caatinga and in granite- or sandstone-dominated areas. It is almost always found above 500 m (1,600 ft) of elevation. The Bahia birds were found near the coast in mangroves, restinga, and abandoned coconut plantations.

== Behavior ==
=== Movement ===
The grey-breasted parakeet is not known to have any pattern of movement.

=== Feeding ===
The grey-breasted parakeet forages for fruits and seeds in the forest canopy.

=== Breeding ===
The grey-breasted parakeet's breeding season is not fully known but in Ceará includes February and March. It nests in cavities in trees and in rocks, and also uses nest boxes erected by conservation projects. The clutch size can be as high as seven eggs. The incubation period, time to fledging, and details of parental care are not known.

=== Vocalization ===
The grey-breasted parakeet's call is a "piercing, fast, chattering 't'kreet-kreet-wik-kreet-krit'."

== Status ==
The IUCN originally assessed the grey-breasted parakeet as Critically Endangered but in 2017 revised the status to Endangered. It occupies very small enclaves and has an estimated population of between about 400 and 600 mature individuals. As a result of intensive conservation efforts including the provision of nest boxes the population is believed to be increasing at all three known locations. Most of what had been its forest habitat has been converted to agriculture, especially coffee farming. An ongoing threat is illegal trapping for the pet trade, both domestic and international, though the rate of it has apparently lessened since the early 2000s. The lack of natural nest cavities has somewhat been offset by the provision of nest boxes. The authors of the 2022 publication note that their discovery in Bahia "suggests that the species has considerable ecological plasticity and supports both the possibility of a larger former distribution and its potential capability to use 'new' habitats".
