= Acarape =

Municipality in Ceará, Brazil

- Municipality
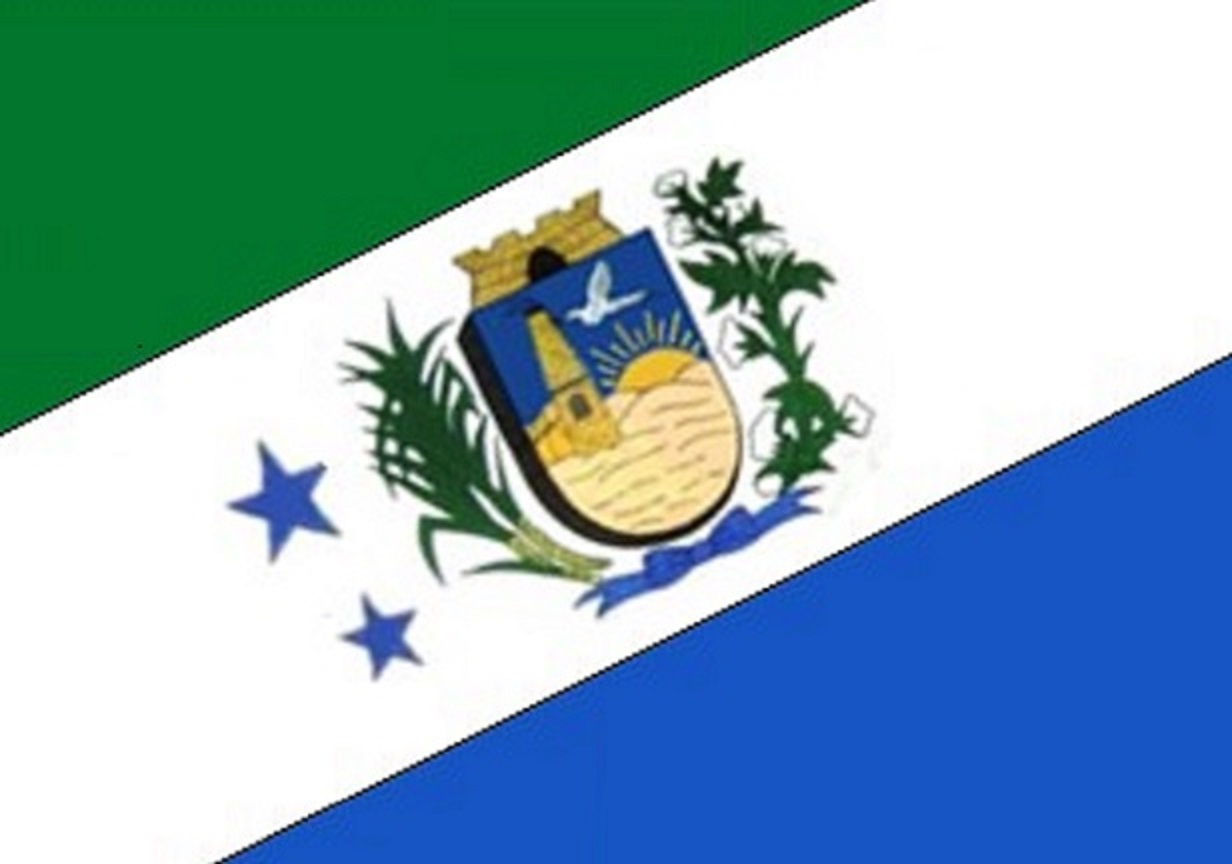
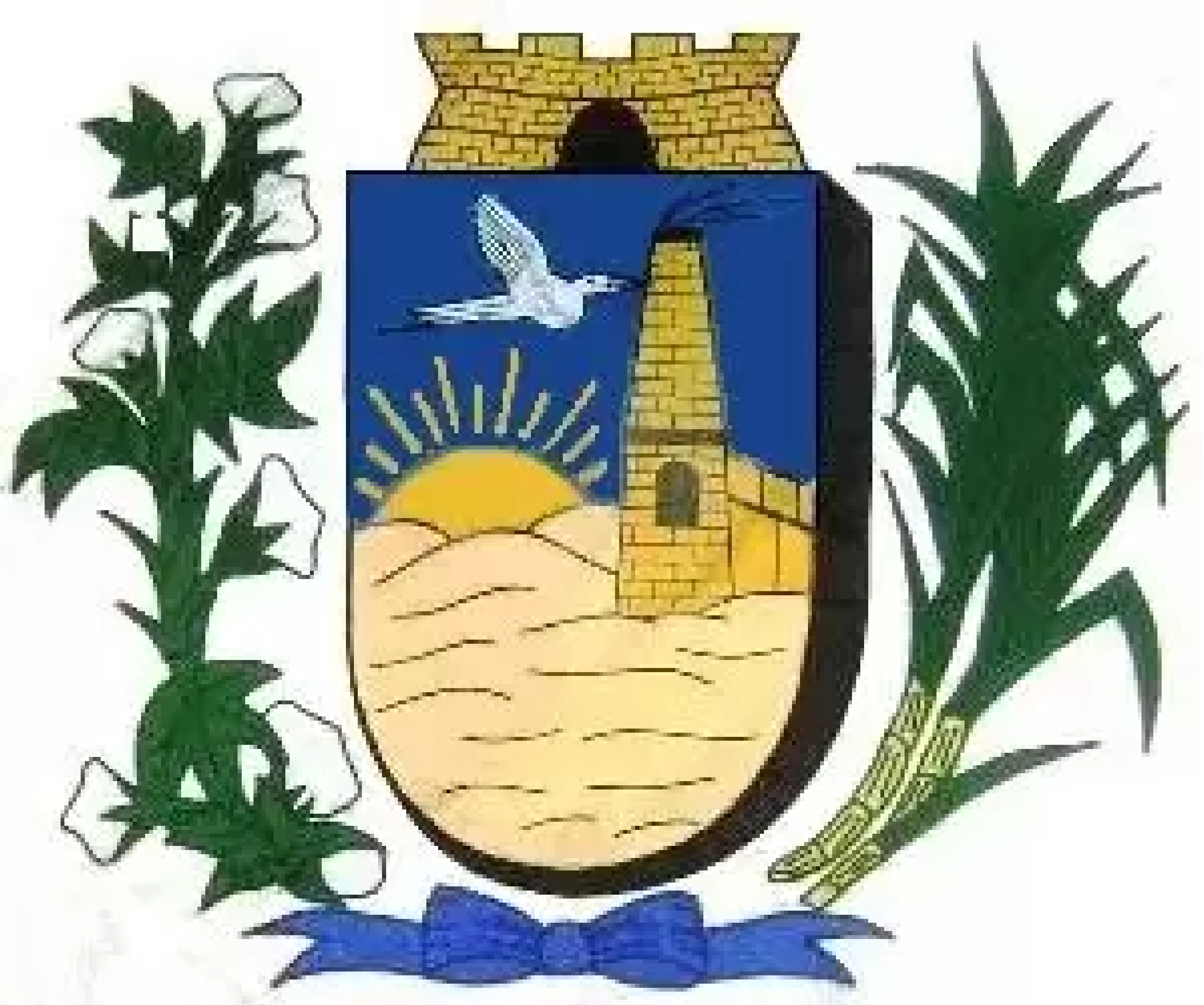
- Flag Coat of arms

- Location of Acarape in Ceará
- Coordinates: 4°13′27″S 38°42′30″W
- Country: Brazil
- Region: Nordeste
- State: Ceará
- Mesoregion: Noroeste Cearense

Area
  - Total: 50 sq mi (130 km^{2})

Population (2020)
  - Total: 15,036
  - Density: 255.2/sq mi (98.52/km^{2})
- Time zone: UTC−3 (BRT)

Acarape is a municipality in the north region of the state of Ceará, Brazil.

== History ==
One can attribute the existence of Acarape as simply an urban extension of the city of Redenção given that only 3 km separate the two cities.

Initially the location of today's Acarape was called Calaboca which was part of the city of Redenção. When the slaves were freed in Brazil, the people of the very modest location of Calaboca decided to pay homage to their origins, thus changing the name to Acarape which means "from the Acarás".

Before the change above, Calaboca benefited from rail track linking Fortaleza to Baturité and the establishment of a rail station in Calaboca on October 26, 1879.

Being part of a major rail route served as an incentive for small merchants to open stores in Calaboca. The population grew and on April 16, 1987, the location became a municipality with the name of Acarape.

== Agriculture ==
- Sugarcane
- Bean

== Industries ==
- Cachaça: Ypióca group

== Curiosities ==
Acarape is also used by the population as a reference to city water. If one person says to be drinking water from Acarape, this person is saying that the water is tap water. This is the case, because one of the largest dams in the state of Ceará is the Acarape do Meio Dam at Redenção.
