= University for International Integration of the Afro-Brazilian Lusophony =

Public federal university in Redenção, Ceará, Brazil

- Universidade da Integração Internacional da Lusofonia Afro-Brasileira
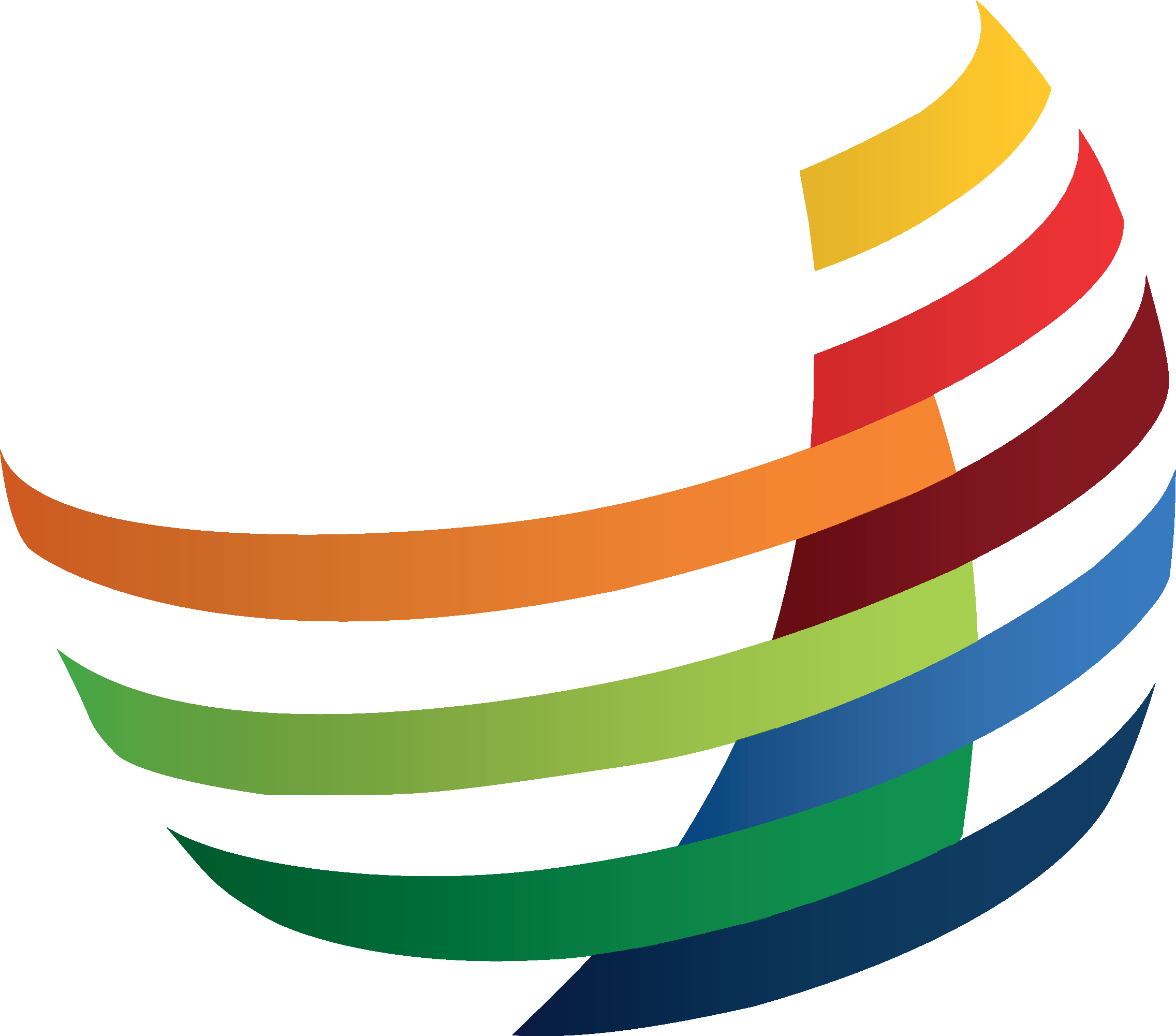
- Other names: UNILAB
- Type: Public Federal
- Established: 2010
- Affiliations: Ministry of Education
- Chancellor: Tomaz Aroldo da Mota Santos
- Vice-Chancellor: Aristeu Rosendo
- Academic staff: 173 (2014)
- Administrative staff: 468 (2014)
- Students: 4166 (2014)
- Undergraduates: 2176 (2014)
- Postgraduates: 105 (2014)
- Location: Redenção, Ceará, Brazil
- Website: www.unilab.edu.br

The University for International Integration of the Afro-Brazilian Lusophony (Portuguese: Universidade da Integração Internacional da Lusofonia Afro-Brasileira, UNILAB) is a public federal university located in Redenção, Ceará, Brazil. The city was chosen because it was the first Brazilian city to abolish slavery. The major courses offered are preferentially the ones included in the mutual interest of all countries in the Community of Portuguese Language Countries. They are: Brazil, Angola, Cape Verde, Guinea Bissau, Sao Tome and Principe, Mozambique, Portugal and East Timor. Looking for international integration, 50% of the seats in the university are for international students from those countries.

According to Paulo Speller, the president of the commission that was responsible for creating the university, "in the first year (2010) the University had about 350 students from 8 different countries. In total the University might have more than 10.000 students when it is fully structured.".

Currently, the Unilab has four campuses: the Liberdade Campus in Redenção, the Auroras Campus in Redenção, the Palmares Campus in Acarape and the Malês Campus in São Francisco do Conde.

== History ==
The Law Project was sent to the Brazilian National Congress on August 20, 2008. The commission responsible for the creation of the university was given by the education minister Fernando Haddad. Paulo Speller, who was the chancellor at the Federal University of Mato Grosso (UFMT), was chosen to be the president of this commission.

During this period, the commission had many meetings and debates. Many import partnerships were created with Brazilian national politicians and universities. Also the commission worked together with international Universities and important organizations. They analyzed topics given by the organization responsible for higher education development in the world.

The Educational and Cultural commission in the Brazilian Chamber of Deputies approved the Law Project 3891/08 on March 13, 2009. officially creating the University of International Integration of the Afro-Brazilian Lusophony. The main objective is the formation of human resources to develop the integration between Brazil and the other countries with Portuguese as an official language.

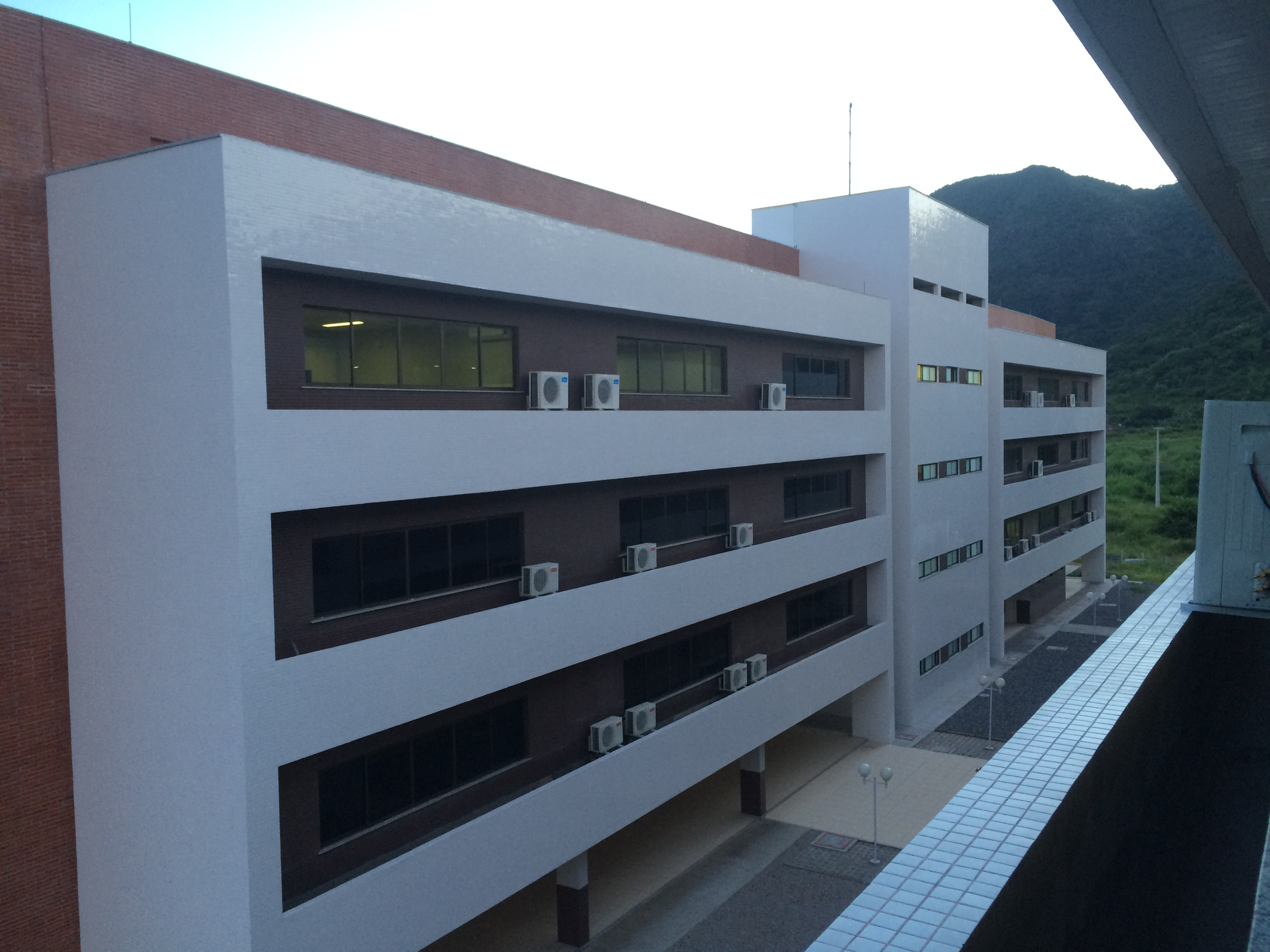
Palmares Campus

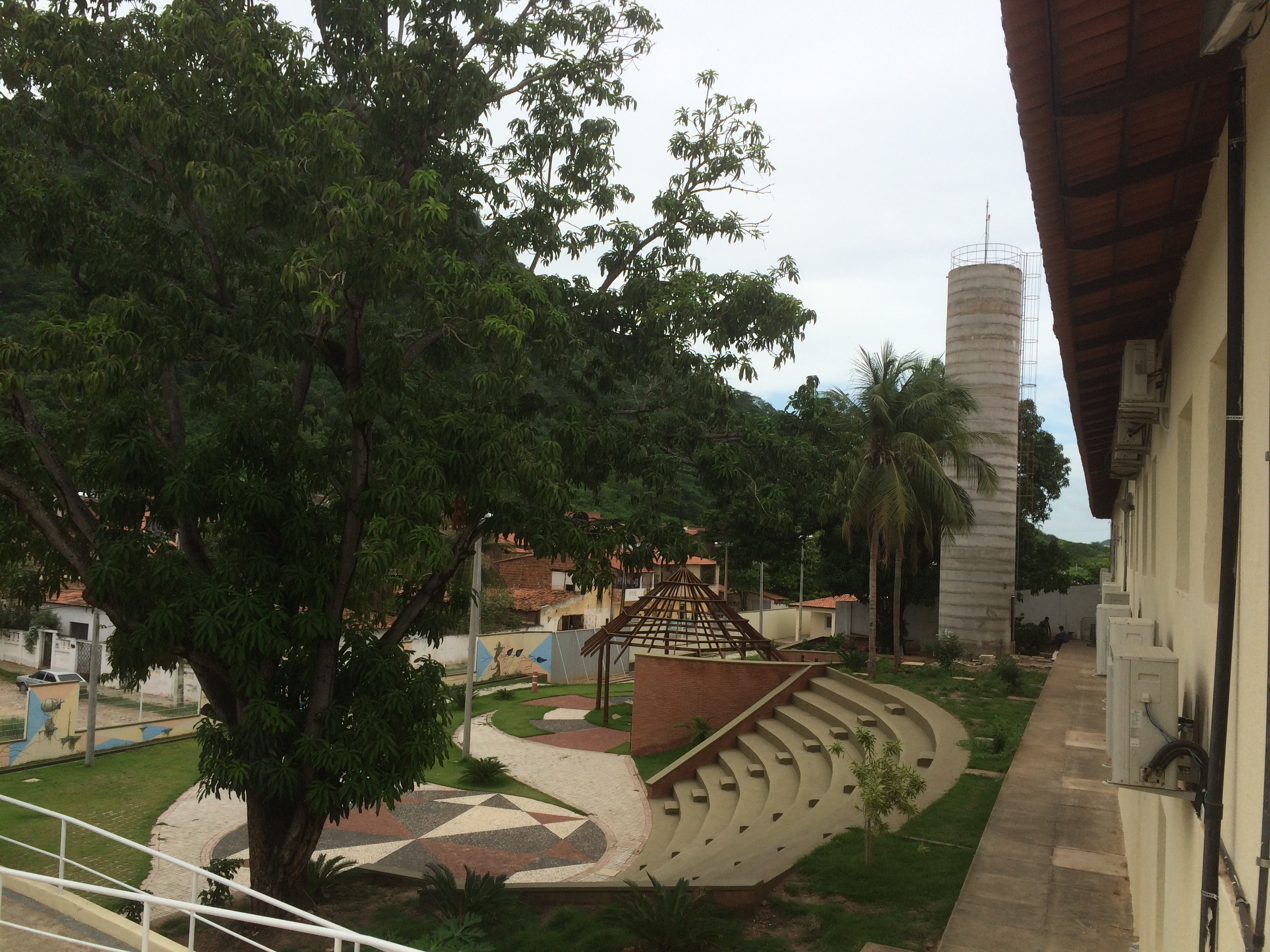
Liberdade Campus

== Structure ==
- The Liberdade Campus in Redenção.
- The Auroras Campus in Redenção.
- The Palmares Campus in Acarape.
- The Malês Campus in São Francisco do Conde.

== Majors ==
- Agronomy.
- Anthropology.
- Biological Sciences.
- Chemistry.
- Computer Engineering.
- Energy Engineering.
- English.
- Food Engineering.
- History.
- Humanities.
- International Relations.
- Mathematics.
- Nursing.
- Pedagogy.
- Pharmacy.
- Physics.
- Portuguese.
- Public Administration.
- Social Sciences.
- Social Service.
- Sociology.

== Masters ==
- Academic Master in Energy and Environment.
- Academic Master's in Nursing - MAENF.
- Academic Master's in Language Studies.
- Academic Master's in Language Studies: Lusophone Brazil-Africa Contexts.
- Academic Master in Sociobiodiversity and Sustainable Technologies – MASTS.
- Associate Master in Anthropology UFC-UNILAB.
- Interdisciplinary Master in Humanities – MIH.
- Professional Master's in Teaching and Teacher Training (association with IFCE).
- Professional Master's in Mathematics in National Network - PROFMAT.

== Chancellors ==
| Name | Institute | Election |
|---|---|---|
| Paulo Speller | Humanities | Pro Tempore |
| Nilma Lino Gomes | Humanities | Pro Tempore |
| Tomaz Aroldo da Mota Santos | Natural Science and Mathematics | Pro Tempore |
| Anastácio de Queiroz Sousa | Health Studies | Pro Tempore |
| Roque do Nascimento Albuquerque | Humanities | Elected |

== See also ==
- Brazil University Rankings
- Federal University of Ceará
- List of federal universities of Brazil
- State University of Ceará
- Universities and higher education in Brazil
