= Peral =

Peral may refer to:

- Isaac Peral, the Spanish marine engineer
- Peral (submarine), an early submarine design
- Peral, Portugal, a civil parish in western Portugal
