= Diogo Abreu (geographer) =

Portuguese geographer (born 1947)

Prof. Diogo José Brochado de Abreu (born 24 July 1947, Alguber) is a Portuguese geographer.

After his basic and secondary education at Colégio Militar, he graduated in geography in 1978 at the Faculty of Humanities of the University of Lisbon, where he also took a Doctorate in Geography in 1989.

He is known for his research, teaching and consulting activities, besides having been President of the Portuguese Speleological Federation. He is currently the Director of the Centre for Geographical Studies of the University of Lisbon.

26 of his academic publications are listed on the University of Lisbon website.

== Qualifications ==
- 2006 - Agregação em Geografia, Universidade de Lisboa
- 1989 - Doutoramento em Geografia Humana, Faculdade de Letras, Universidade de Lisboa
- 1978 - Licenciatura em Geografia, Faculdade de Letras, Universidade de Lisboa
