= Nilto Maciel =

Brazilian writer (1945–2014)

Nilto Maciel (January 30, 1945 in Baturité – April 29, 2014) was a Brazilian writer. He wrote poetry and tales in Portuguese, Esperanto, Spanish, Italian and French.

He studied law at the Federal University of Ceará and he lived in Brasília from 1992 to 2008 where he had several bureaucratic jobs.

He has worked for the publications O Saco and Literatura.

== Works ==
- Itinerário, 1974,
- Tempos de Mula Preta, 1981
- A Guerra da Donzela,1982
- Punhalzinho Cravado de Ódio, 1986
- Estaca Zero, 1987
- Os Guerreiros de Monte-Mor, 1988
- O Cabra que Virou Bode, 1991
- As Insolentes Patas do Cão, 1991
- Os Varões de Palma, 1994
- Navegador, 1996
- Babel, contos, 1997
- A Rosa Gótica, 1997
- Vasto Abismo, 1998
- Pescoço de Girafa na Poeira, 1999
- A Última Noite de Helena, 2003
- Os Luzeiros do Mundo, 2005
- Panorama do Conto Cearense, 2005
- A Leste da Morte, 2006.
- Carnavalha, 2007
- Contistas do Ceará: D’A Quinzena ao Caos Portátil, 2008
- Contos reunidos (volume I), 2009

== Awards ==
- Prêmio Fundação Cultural de Fortaleza, CE
- Prêmio da Secretaria de Cultura e Desporto do Ceará, 1981, 1986
- Prêmio VI Prêmio Literário Cidade de Fortaleza, 1996,
- Prêmio “Cruz e Sousa”, 1997
- Prêmio "Eça de Queiroz",1998
- Prêmio “Bolsa Brasília de Produção Literária”, 1999
- Prêmio “Brasília de Literatura”, 2003
- Prêmio “Graciliano Ramos”, 2005
- Roteiro - Viagem à Amazonia (1978)

== Sources ==
- Macedo, Dimas. Uma novela de Nilto Maciel, in Leitura e Conjuntura, Secretaria de Cultura e Desporto do Ceará, Fortaleza, 1984, 1.ª ed., e UFC/Casa de José de Alencar, Fortaleza, 1995, 2.ª ed. ver. amp.
- Estaca Zero, in Ossos do Ofício, Editora Oficina, Fortaleza, 1992.
- Contos Picarescos e Alegóricos, in Punhalzinho Cravado de Ódio, Secretaria de Cultura e Desporto, Fortaleza, CE, 1986.
- Visão e Revisão das Letras Cearenses, in A Metáfora do Sol, Ed. Oficina, Fortaleza, CE, 1989.
- Punhalzinho Cravado de Ódio, in Crítica Imperfeita, Imprensa Universitária da UFC, Fortaleza, CE, 2001.
