= Barreiras (Cadaval) =

Coordinates: 39.2666°N 9.0545°W

Barreiras is a small Portuguese village located in Peral, Cadaval, in the Lisbon district.

Its population is around 110 inhabitants, all over the village, but its center has just around 60.
