= Clàudia Valls =

Mathematician

Clàudia Valls Anglés is a mathematician and an expert in dynamical systems. She is an associate professor in the Instituto Superior Técnico of the University of Lisbon in Portugal.

== Education ==
Valls completed a doctorate at the University of Barcelona in 1999. Her dissertation, The Classical Arnold Example of Diffusion with Two Equal Parameters, was supervised by Carles Simó Torres.

== Books ==
Valls is the co-author of books with Luís Barreira and others, including:

- Instability in Hamiltonian systems (with Antonio Pumariño, Electronic Journal of Qualitative Theory of Differential Equations Monograph Series, Vol. 1, 2005)
- Stability of nonautonomous differential equations (with Luís Barreira, Lecture Notes in Mathematics, Vol. 1926, Springer, 2008)
- Complex analysis and differential equations (with Luís Barreira, Springer Undergraduate Mathematics Series, Springer, 2012), translated into French as Analyse complexe et équations différentielles (Enseignement SUP-Maths, EDP Sciences, 2011)
- Exercices d’analyse complexe et équations différentielles [Exercises in complex analysis and differential equations] (with Luís Barreira, Enseignement SUP-Maths, EDP Sciences, 2011)
- Equações diferenciais: Teoria qualitativa (with Luís Barreira, Ensino da Ciência e da Tecnologia, Vol. 33, IST Press, 2010), translated into English as Ordinary differential equations: Qualitative theory (Graduate Studies in Mathematics, Vol. 137, American Mathematical Society, 2012)
- Dynamical systems: An introduction (with Luís Barreira and Davor Dragičević, Universitext, Springer, 2013; originally published in Portuguese in 2012)
- Exercises in linear algebra (with Luís Barreira, World Scientific, 2016)
- Admissibility and hyperbolicity (with Luís Barreira, SpringerBriefs in Mathematics, Springer, 2018)
- Dynamical systems by example (with Luís Barreira, Problem Books in Mathematics, Springer, 2019)
