= Peral, Portugal =

Peral
- Civil parish
- Location in Portugal
- Coordinates: 39.262°N 9.075°W
- Country: Portugal
- Region: Oeste e Vale do Tejo
- Intermunic. comm.: Oeste
- District: Lisbon
- Municipality: Cadaval

Area
  - Total: 16.46 km^{2} (6.36 sq mi)

Population (2011)
  - Total: 905
  - Density: 55/km^{2} (140/sq mi)
- Time zone: UTC+00:00 (WET)
  - Summer (DST): UTC+01:00 (WEST)

Peral (Portuguese pronunciation: [pɨˈɾal]) is a freguesia (civil parish) of Cadaval Municipality, Portugal. The population in 2011 was 905, in an area of 16.46 km². One of its villages is Barreiras.
