= Luís Barreira =

Portuguese mathematician (born 1968)

Luís Barreira (born 25 September 1968) is a Portuguese mathematician and a professor in the department of mathematics of Instituto Superior Técnico.

He is the author or coauthor of 13 books, many with Clàudia Valls, including among them Análise Complexa e Equações Diferenciais, Exercícios de Análise Complexa e Equações Diferenciais, Lyapunov Exponents and Smooth Ergodic Theory, Nonuniform Hyperbolicity, Stability of Nonautonomous Differential Equations, and Dimension and Recurrence in Hyperbolic Dynamics. He's also the author of several scientific articles, predominantly in Differential Equations, Dynamic Systems, Ergodic Theory and Multifractal Analysis.

== Education ==
Barreira got his degree in 1991 in Applied Mathematics and Computation, from Instituto Superior Técnico.

He got his PhD in math in 1996 at Penn State University.

== Retraction ==
Barreira's paper A Perron-type theorem for nonautonomous difference equations has been retracted by Nonlinearity in 2026 with the explanation that it bears similarities to a previous work by the authors.

== Awards ==
Among his awards are:

- Prémio Gulbenkian Ciência, in 2007;
- Prémio Científico UTL/Santander Totta em Matemática, in 2007;
- Prémio Internacional Ferran Sunyer i Balaguer, in 2008;
