= Barreira Megalithic Complex =

Megalithic site near Sintra, Portugal

- Conjunto Megalítico de Barreira
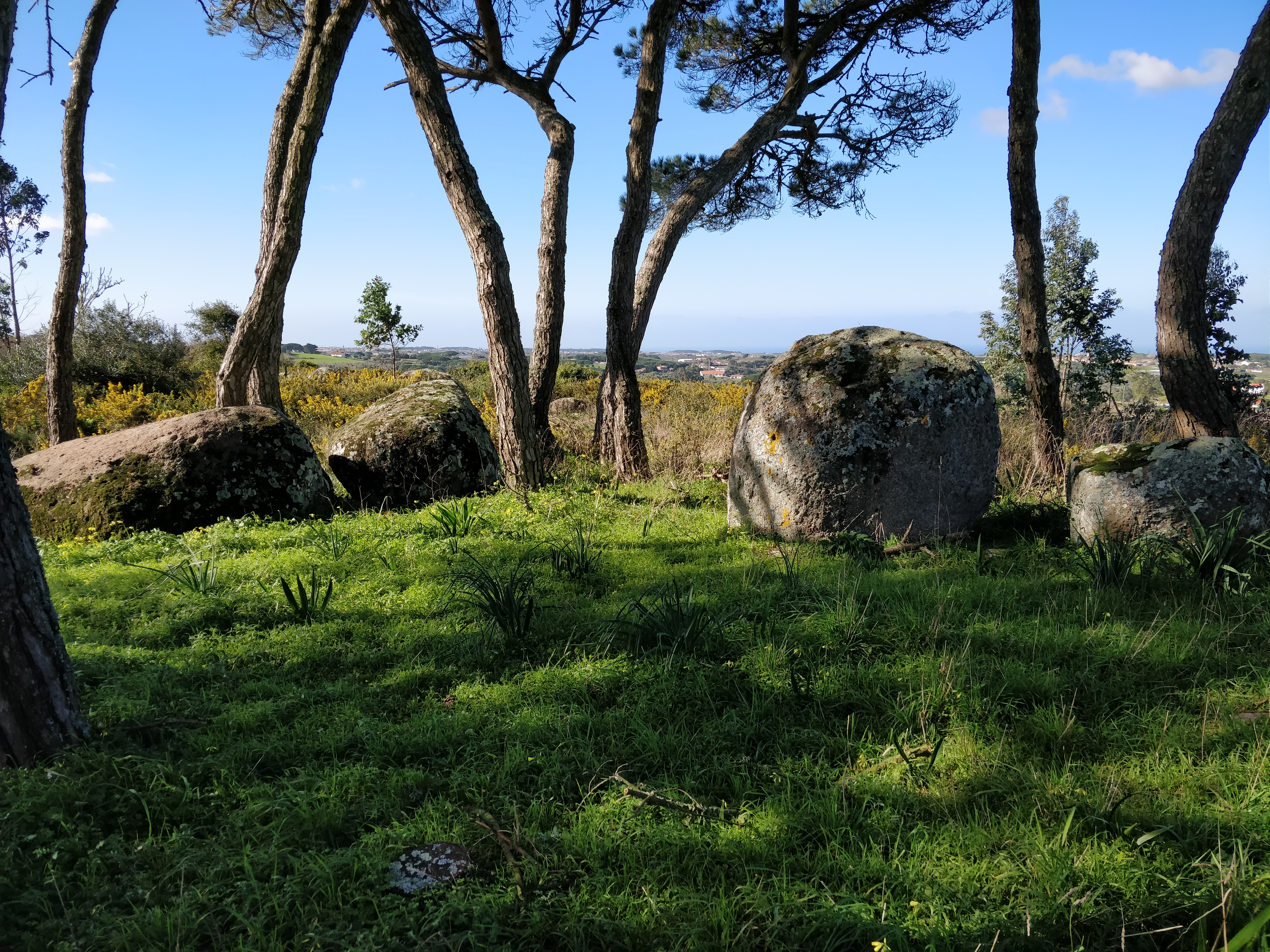
- Some of the stones in the complex
- Interactive map of Barreira Megalithic Complex
- 38°53′23″N 9°22′18″W
- Type: Cromlech
- Location: Sintra, Lisbon District, Portugal

Site notes
- Elevation: 150 m (490 ft)
- Archaeologists: Gil Estevam Miguéis Andrade and Eduardo Prescott Vicente
- Discovered: 1961
- Owner: Private
- Public access: Private

The Barreira Megalithic Complex (Portuguese: Conjunto Megalítico de Barreira) is located in the Sintra municipality in the Lisbon District of Portugal. Situated on a small wooded hill overlooking the village of Odrinhas, site of Roman ruins and an archaeological museum, it consists of about twenty menhirs and other monoliths or megaliths.

The site, which is assumed to be a dolmen or cromlech, contains mainly cylindrical stones of varying heights, with the largest being approximately four metres tall. The size of the stones decreased as they became more distant from the central menhir and the megaliths were arranged irregularly depending on the terrain. No carved or painted symbols have been detected, except for a few pairs of small circular cavities, possibly representing eyes. A small number of items have been found to the west of the complex, including flints from the Lower Paleolithic, ceramic fragments and other items from the Neolithic period, and ceramic fragments from the Iron Age, suggesting that the site has been reused over time.

The complex was not identified as a megalithic site until 1961 when it was studied by Gil Estevam Miguéis Andrade and Eduardo Prescott Vicente, who continued their studies in subsequent years. In 1975 several monoliths were removed to be used in construction work at the Port of Ericeira. In 1985, three more menhirs were also removed by the landowners, including the central monolith. It was classified as a Site of Public Interest in 1993.
