= Alguber =

- Civil parish
- Location in Portugal
- Coordinates: 39.277°N 9.021°W
- Country: Portugal
- Region: Oeste e Vale do Tejo
- Intermunic. comm.: Oeste
- District: Lisbon
- Municipality: Cadaval

Area
  - Total: 19.26 km^{2} (7.44 sq mi)

Population (2011)
  - Total: 957
  - Density: 50/km^{2} (130/sq mi)
- Time zone: UTC+00:00 (WET)
  - Summer (DST): UTC+01:00 (WEST)

Alguber (European Portuguese pronunciation: [alɣuˈβɛɾ]) is a parish of Cadaval, in Lisbon District, Portugal. The population in 2011 was 957, in an area of 19.26 km^{2}.
