= Cadaval =

- Municipality
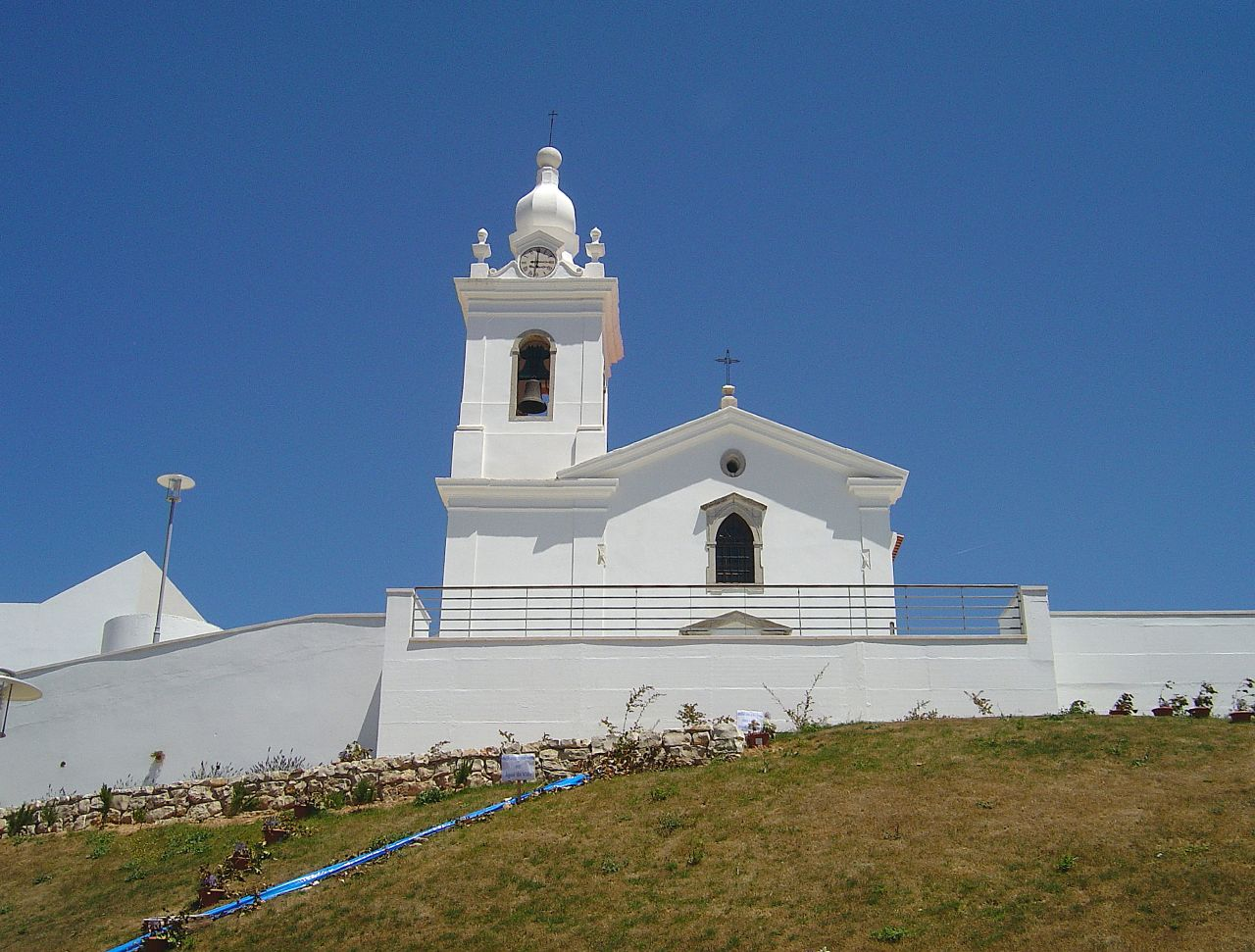
- Church of N. Sra. Da Conceição

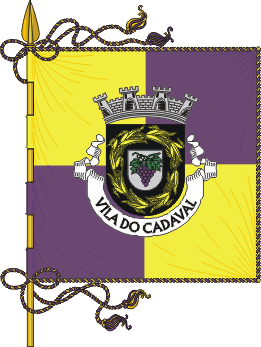
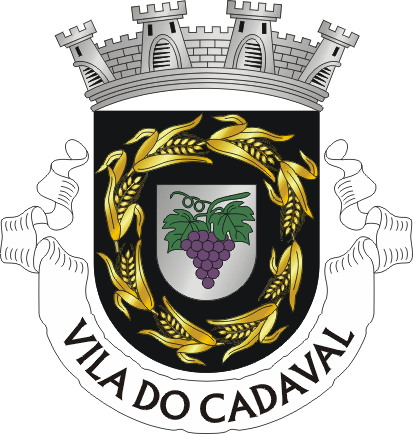
- Flag Coat of arms
- Interactive map of Cadaval
- Location in Portugal
- Coordinates: 39°14′N 9°06′W
- Country: Portugal
- Region: Oeste e Vale do Tejo
- Intermunic. comm.: Oeste
- District: Lisbon
- Parishes: 7

Government
  - President: José Bernardo Nunes (PSD)

Area
  - Total: 174.89 km^{2} (67.53 sq mi)

Population (2011)
  - Total: 14,228
  - Density: 81.354/km^{2} (210.71/sq mi)
- Time zone: UTC+00:00 (WET)
  - Summer (DST): UTC+01:00 (WEST)
- Local holiday: January 13
- Website: www.cm-cadaval.pt

Cadaval (Portuguese: [kɐðɐˈval]) is a municipality in the Oeste intermunicipal community, in the historical Estremadura province and in Lisbon District, of Portugal. The population in 2011 was 14,228, in an area of 174.89 km^{2}.

The present Mayor is José Bernardo Nunes, elected by the Social Democratic Party.

== Parishes ==
Administratively, the municipality is divided into 7 civil parishes (freguesias):

- Alguber
- Cadaval e Pêro Moniz
- Lamas e Cercal
- Painho e Figueiros
- Peral
- Vermelha
- Vilar

== Notable people ==
- Sofia Quintino (1879 in Lamas - 1964) one of the first female physicians to graduate in Portugal. An active feminist and leading developer of a secular nursing service
- Júlio Fogaça (1907 in Cadaval – 1980) a Portuguese politician with a mixed history with the Portuguese Communist Party
- Micael Isidoro (born 1982 in Cadaval) a Portuguese road cyclist
