= Baturité =

Municipality in Ceará, Brazil

- Municipality
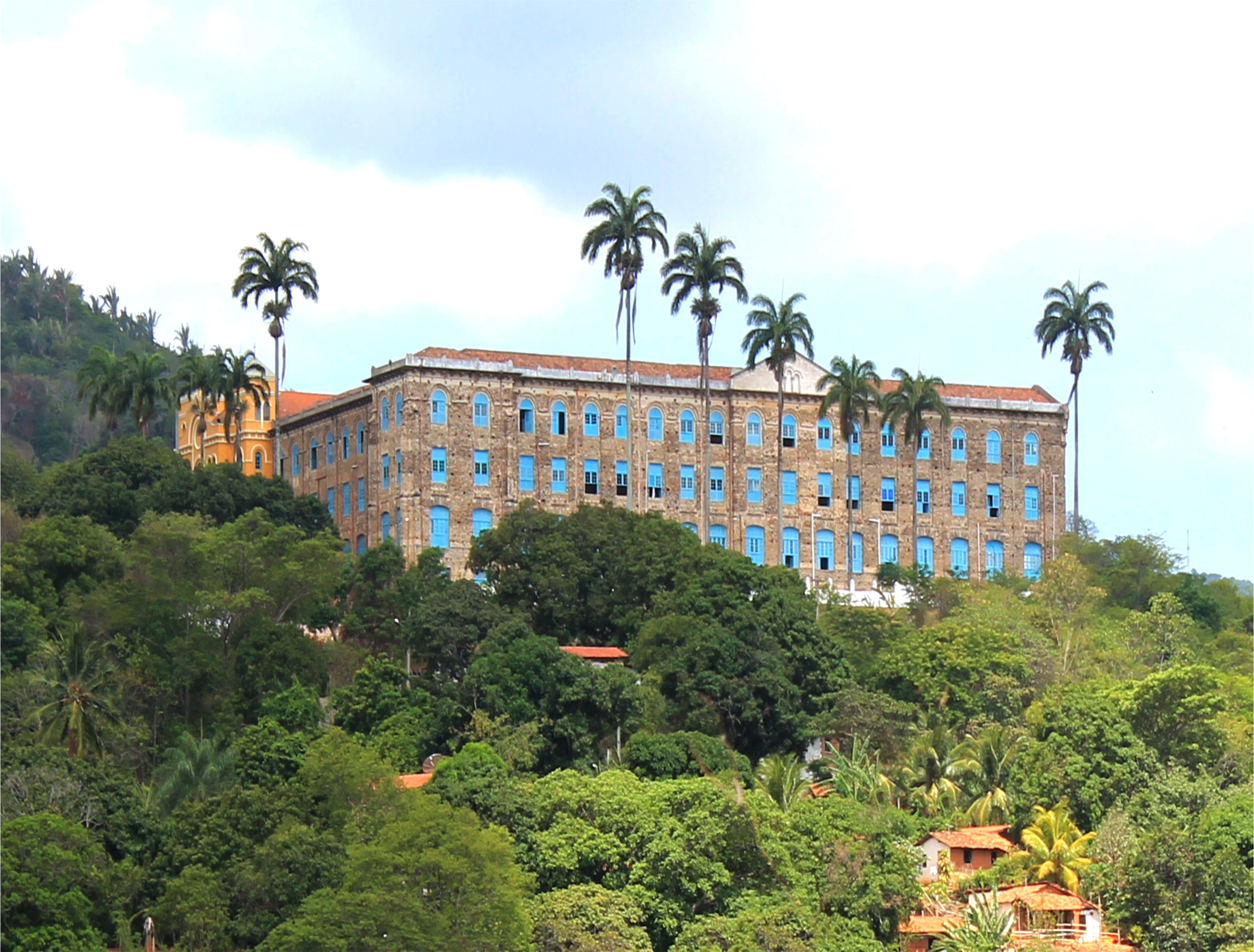

- Flag Coat of arms

- Location in Ceará state

- Location in Brazil
- Coordinates: 04°19′44″S 38°53′06″W
- Country: Brazil
- Region: Northeast
- State: Ceará

Government
  - Mayor: Francisco de Assis Germano Arruda (PDT)

Area
  - Total: 308,780 km^{2} (119,220 sq mi)

Population (2020)
  - Total: 35,941
  - Density: 0.11640/km^{2} (0.30147/sq mi)
- Time zone: UTC−3 (BRT)
- HDI (2010): 0.619 – medium

Baturité is a city of Ceará State, Brazil 80 km (50 mi) from the state capital Fortaleza. It is located in the microregion of Baturité. The population estimate in 2020 was 35,941 inhabitants.

== Economy ==
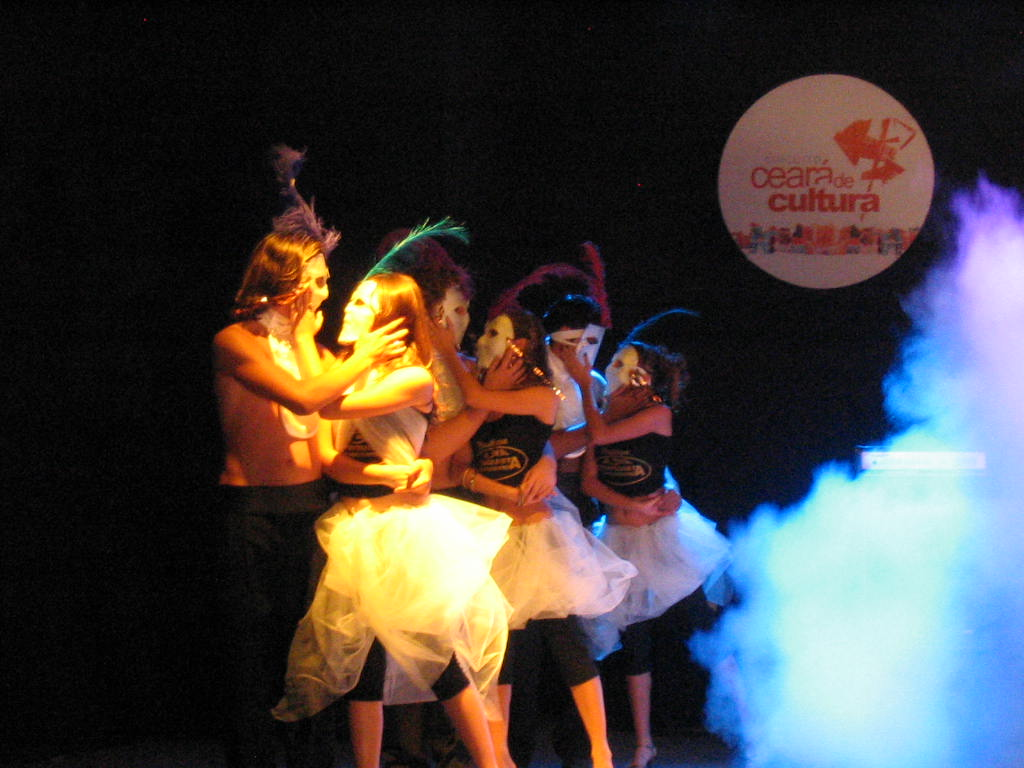
Circuit Ceará of Culture being presented in the edition of Business Fair of Baturité (FENEBE – Feira de Negócios do Maciço de Baturité)

The economy of Baturité is mainly agricultural and based on the cultivation of cotton, sugar cane, rice, maize and beans.

== History ==
Baturité received the first railway in the state of Ceará. It started to operate in 1873. Today, this train station is a museum.

== Notable people ==
- Nilto Maciel (1945–2014), writer
