= Redenção, Ceará =

Municipality in Ceará, Brazil

Coordinates: 4°13′33″S 38°43′51″W

Redenção
- Municipality
- The Municipality of Redenção
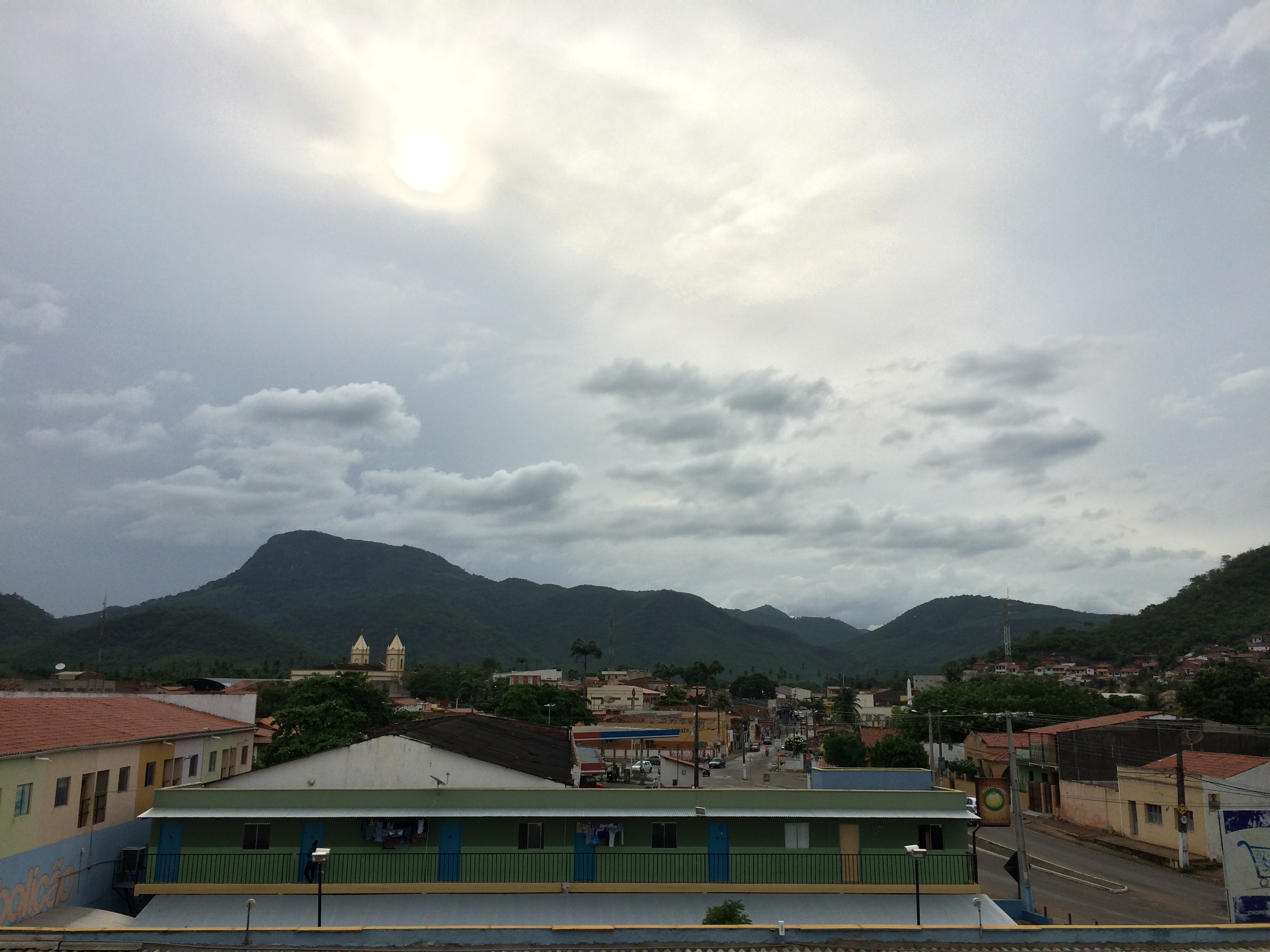
- Redenção, Ceará, Brazil

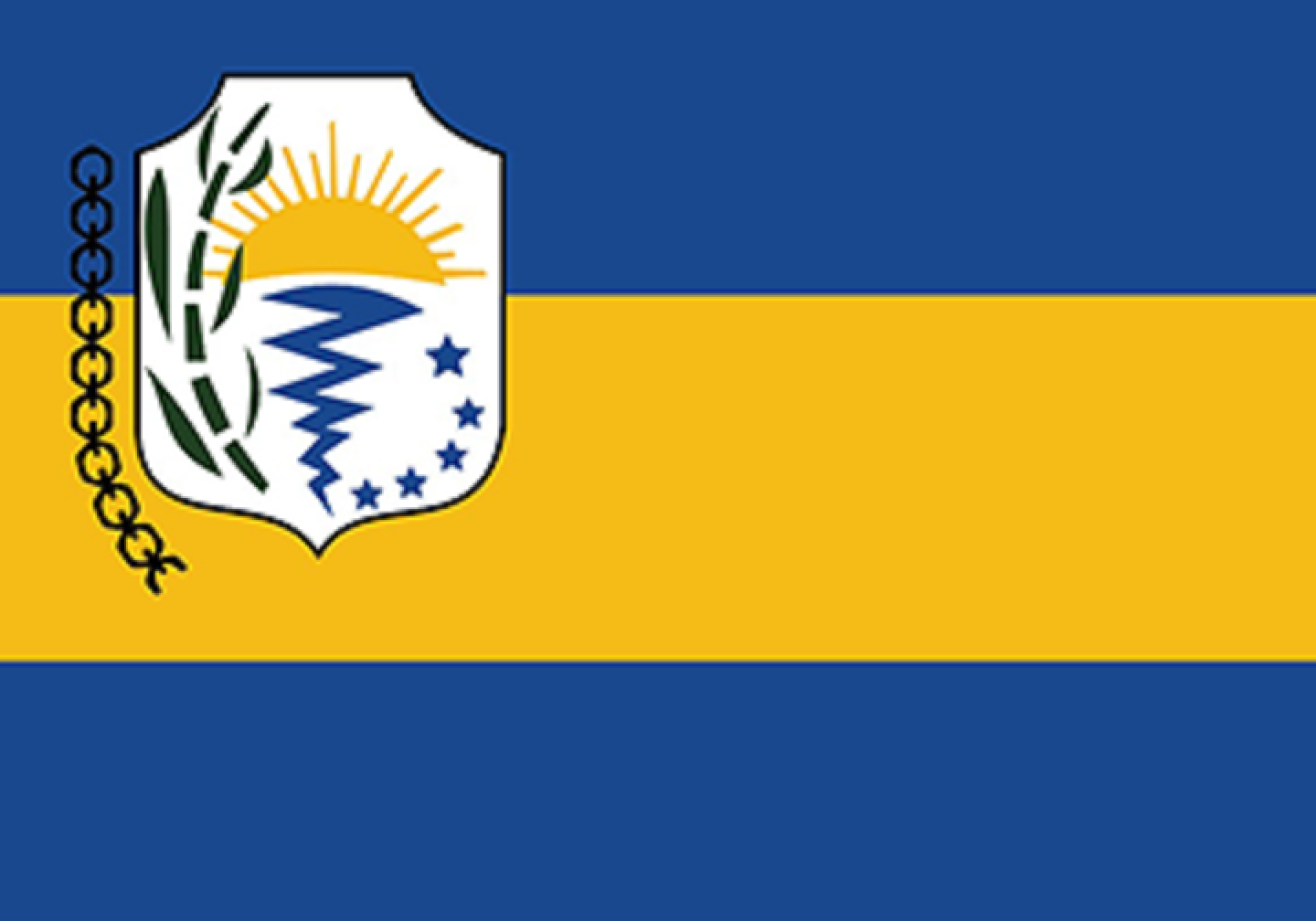
- Flag
- Nickname: Rosal da Liberdade

- Location in Brazil
- Country: Brazil
- Region: Northeast
- State: Ceará

Government
  - Mayor: Manoel Bandeira (PDT)

Area
  - Total: 225,626 km^{2} (87,115 sq mi)

Population (2020)
  - Total: 29,146
  - Density: 11,711/km^{2} (30,330/sq mi)
- Time zone: UTC−3 (BRT)
- Postal Code: 60000-000
- Area code: +55 85
- Website: Redenção, Ceará

Redenção is a municipality in the state of Ceará, in the Northeast region of Brazil. located 55 km away from Fortaleza, the capital of the state. Redenção in Portuguese means redemption, and the city has this name because it was the first city in Brazil to abolish its slaves.

== History ==
The region known as "sopés do Maciço de Baturité" around the Acarape River was inhabited by many different native Brazilians of different ethnicities, like Potyguara, Jenipapo, and Kanyndé. During the expansion of agricultural cultures in the state of Ceará, the region of Redenção started the production of sugarcane. During the 19th century, many slaves were brought from Africa by Portuguese colonizers to work in sugarcane production.

In 1868, the city of Acarape was founded. At that time, all the city of Redenção was inserted in the city of Acarape.

In 1882, the region of Acarape abolished all its slaves; that way, it started being called Redenção. After that, the region became a city.

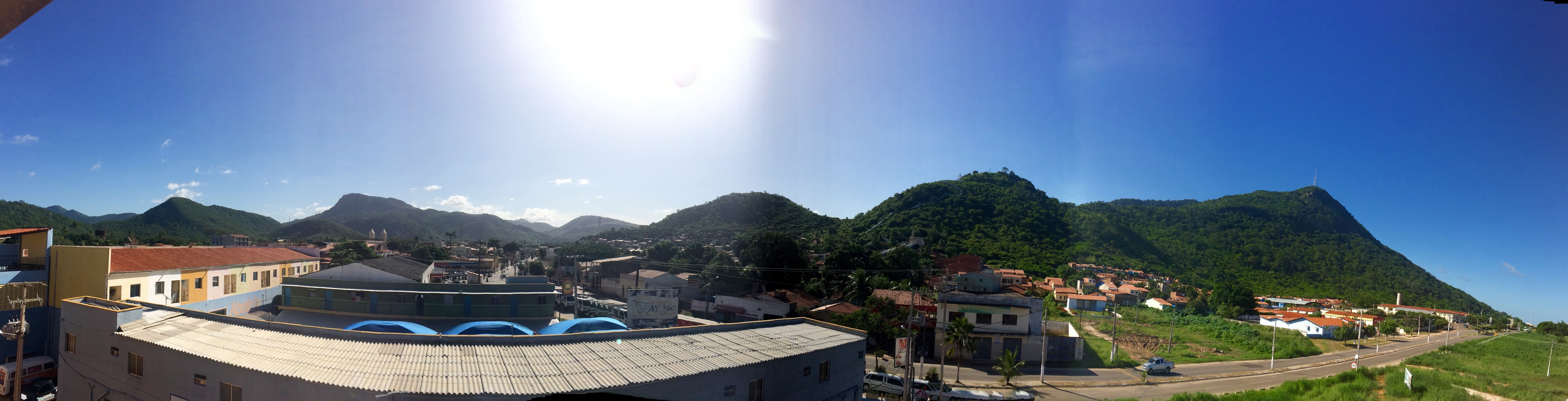
Redenção

== Geography ==
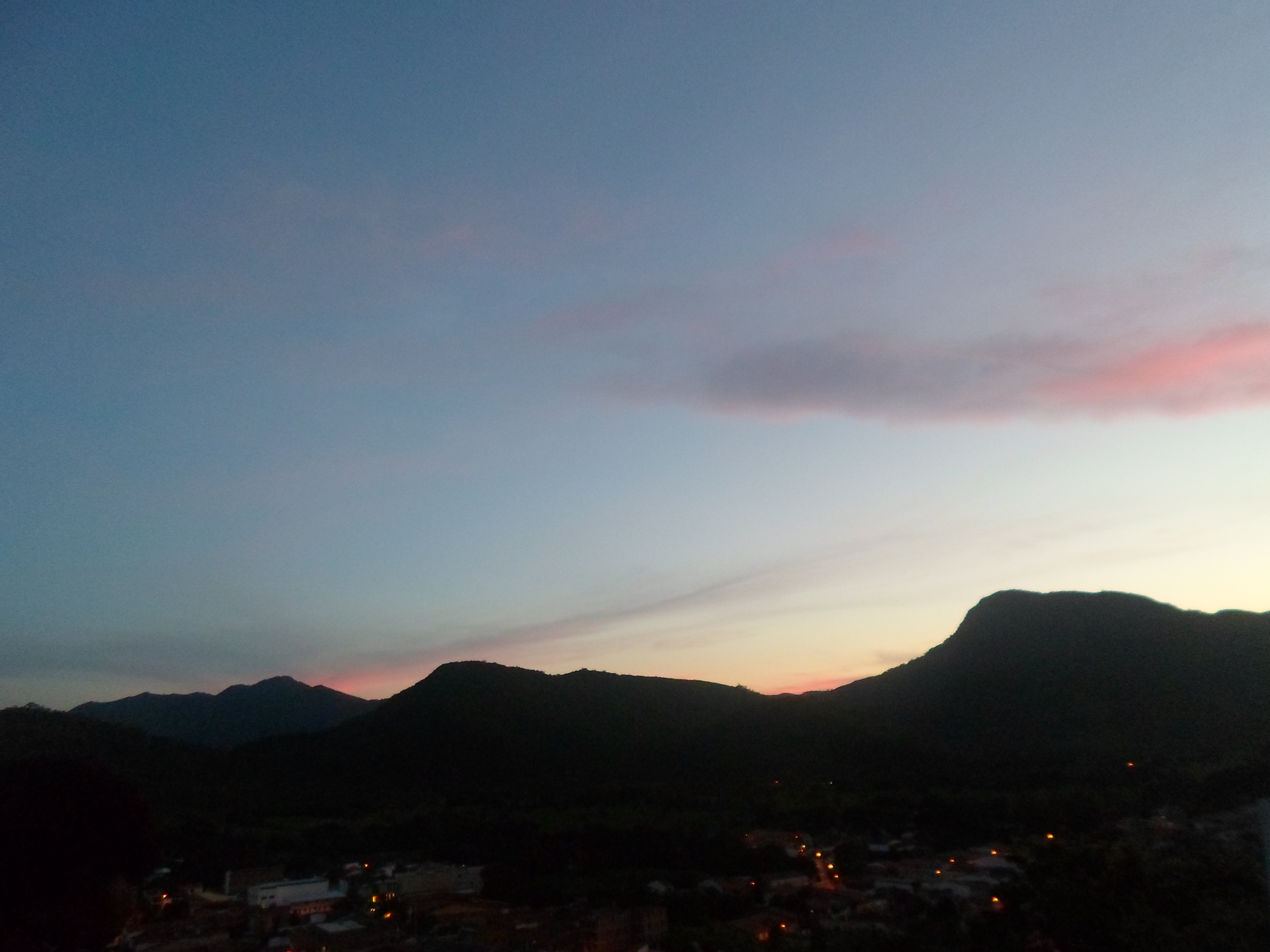
Mountains in Redenção

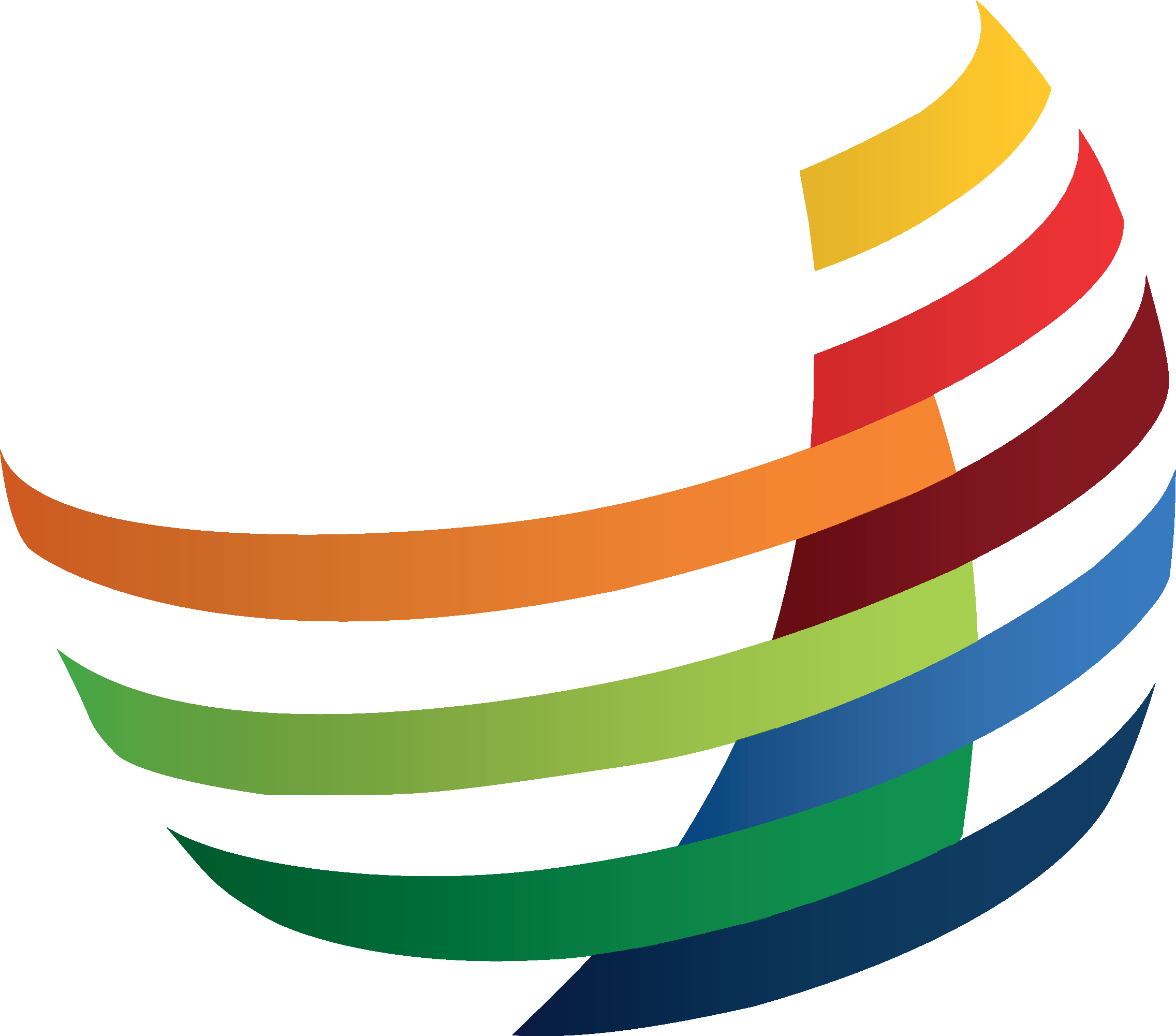
UNILAB

Redenção is located in a tropical semi-humid region, so the weather varies from 22 °C to 32 °C. Redenção is located in an area with mountains and a great amount of rain every year. The vegetation in Redenção is called Caatinga. Redenção is currently divided into four districts called: Redenção, Antônio Diogo, Guassi, and São Geraldo.

== Education ==
Redenção hosts the University of International Integration of the Afro-Brazilian Lusophony (UNILAB) which is a public, federal university. Redenção also has three private high schools and three public high schools. It also hosts a state school of professional education.

== Tourism ==
Redenção is a historic city which is visited by hundreds of tourists every year. The city has two museums, three main squares, and natural landscapes. In Redenção, there is the mountain of Saint Rita which overlooks the city, and also natural lakes and rivers.

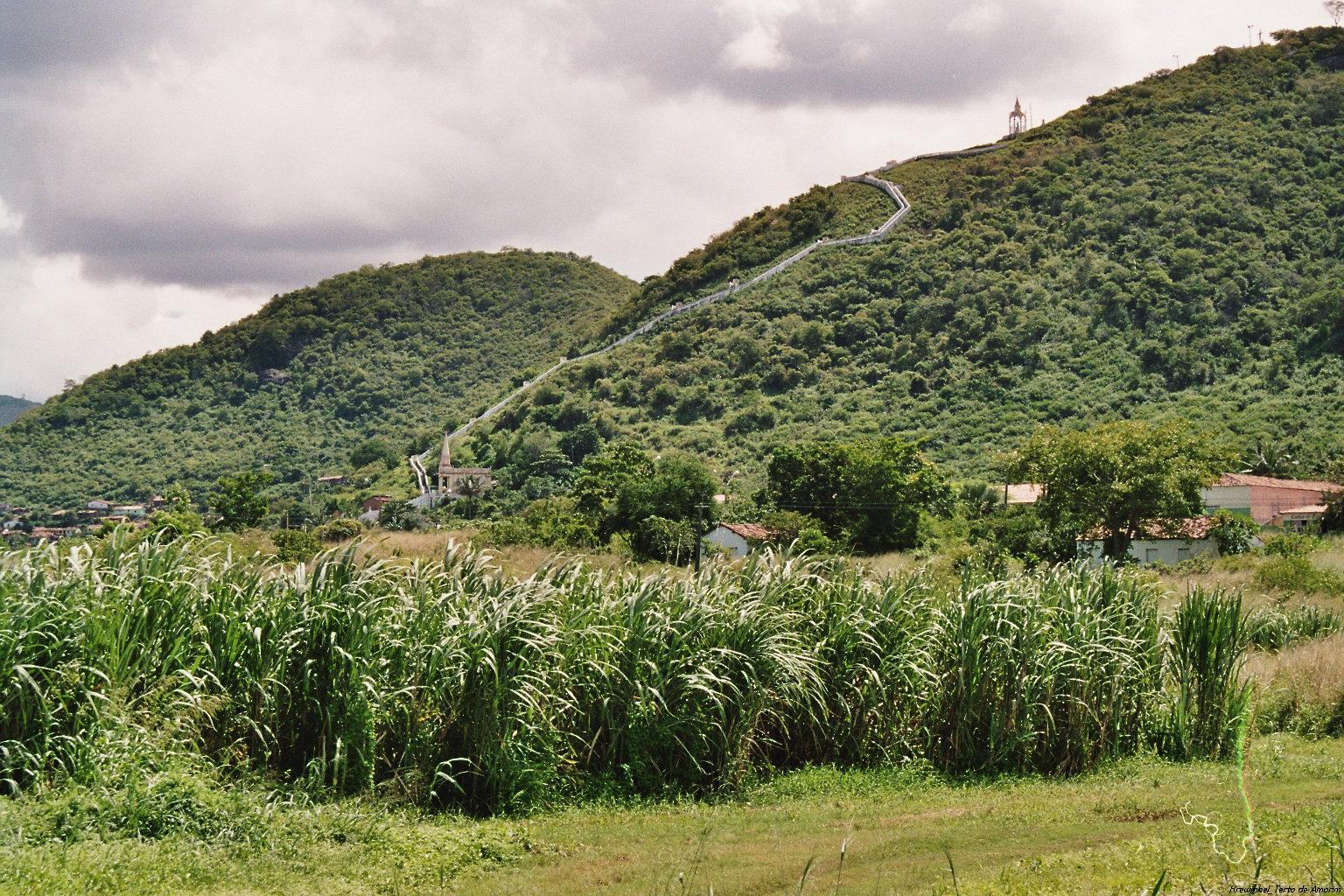
Saint Rita Mountain

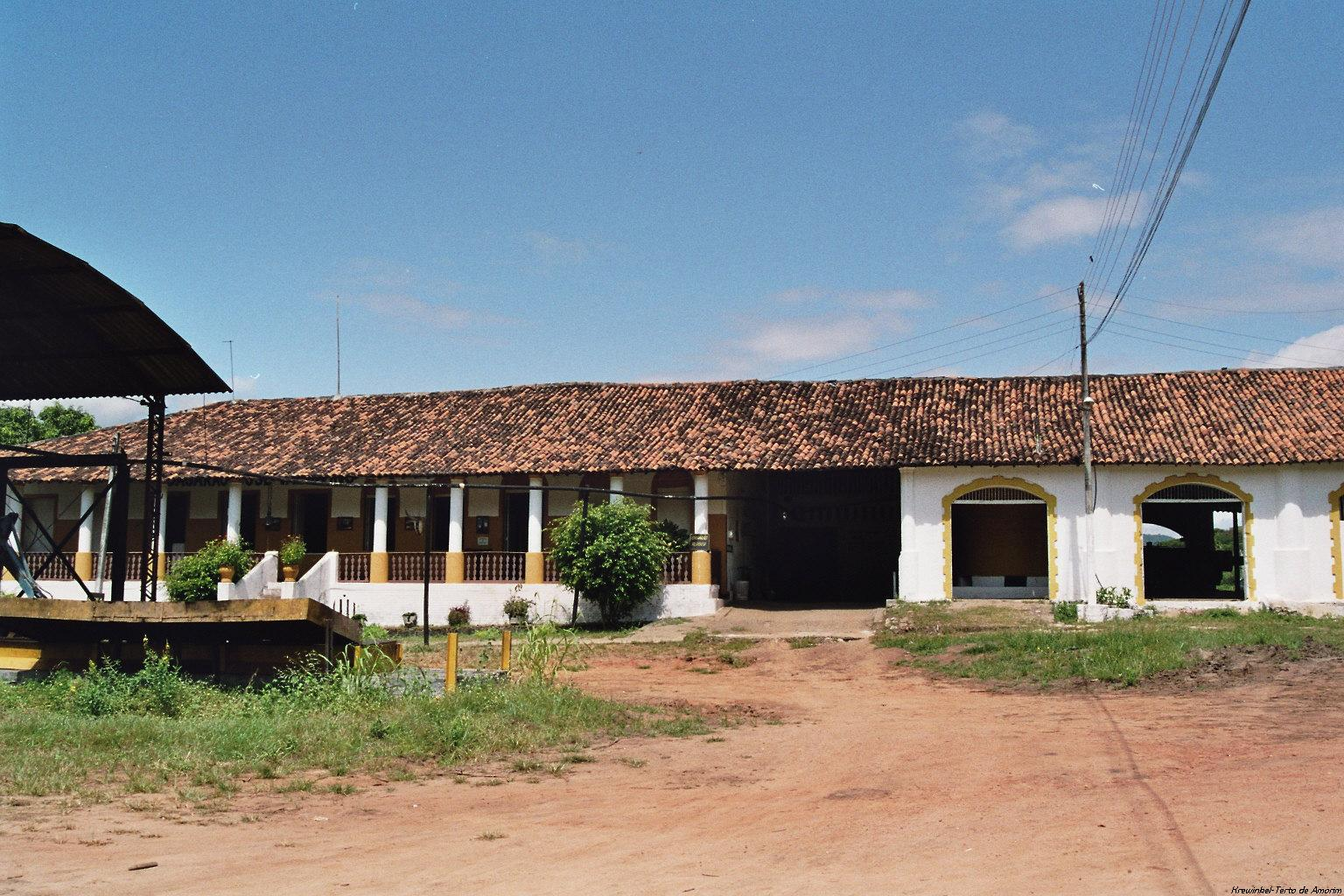
Historical Museum

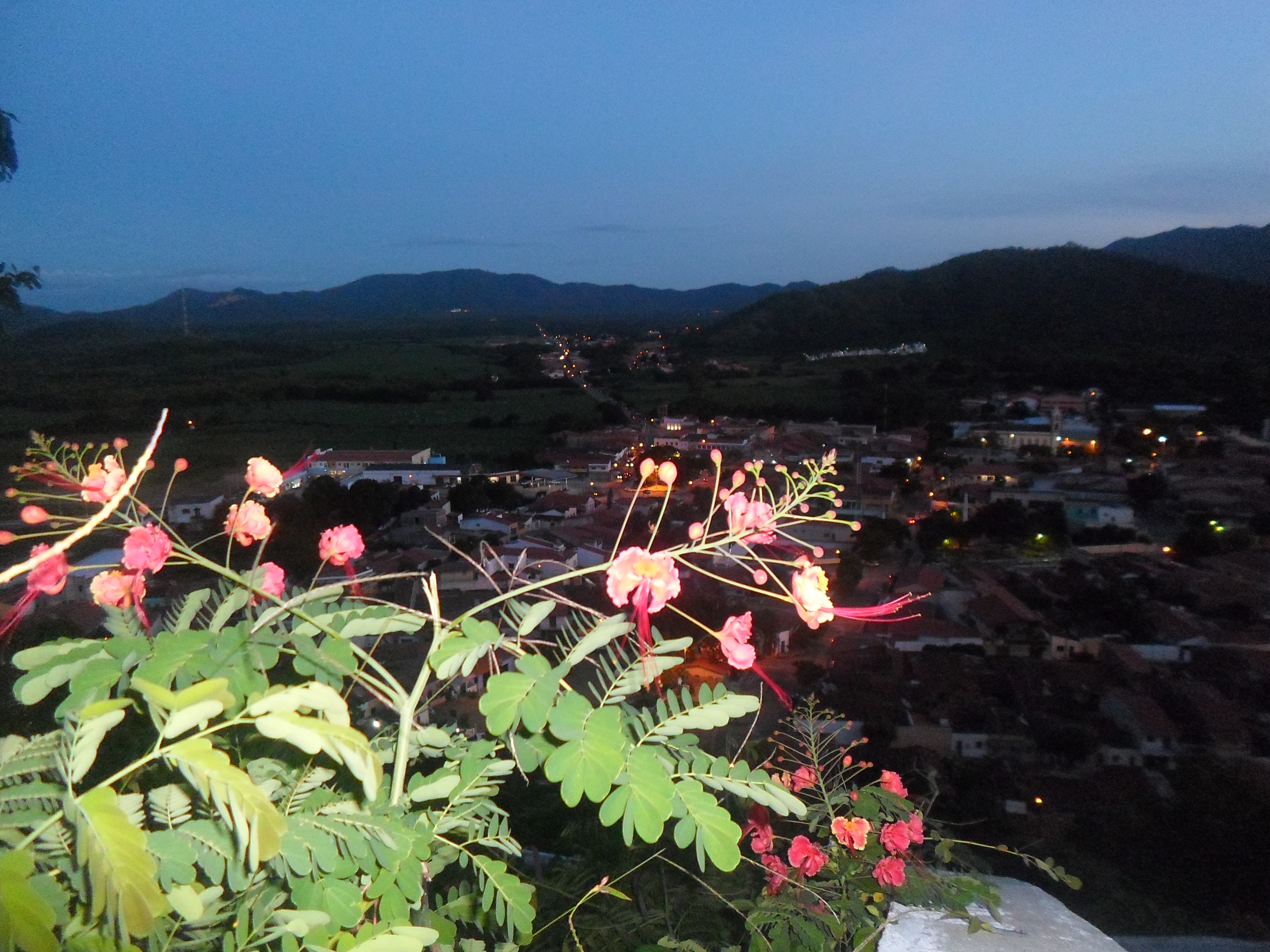
View from Saint Rita Mountain

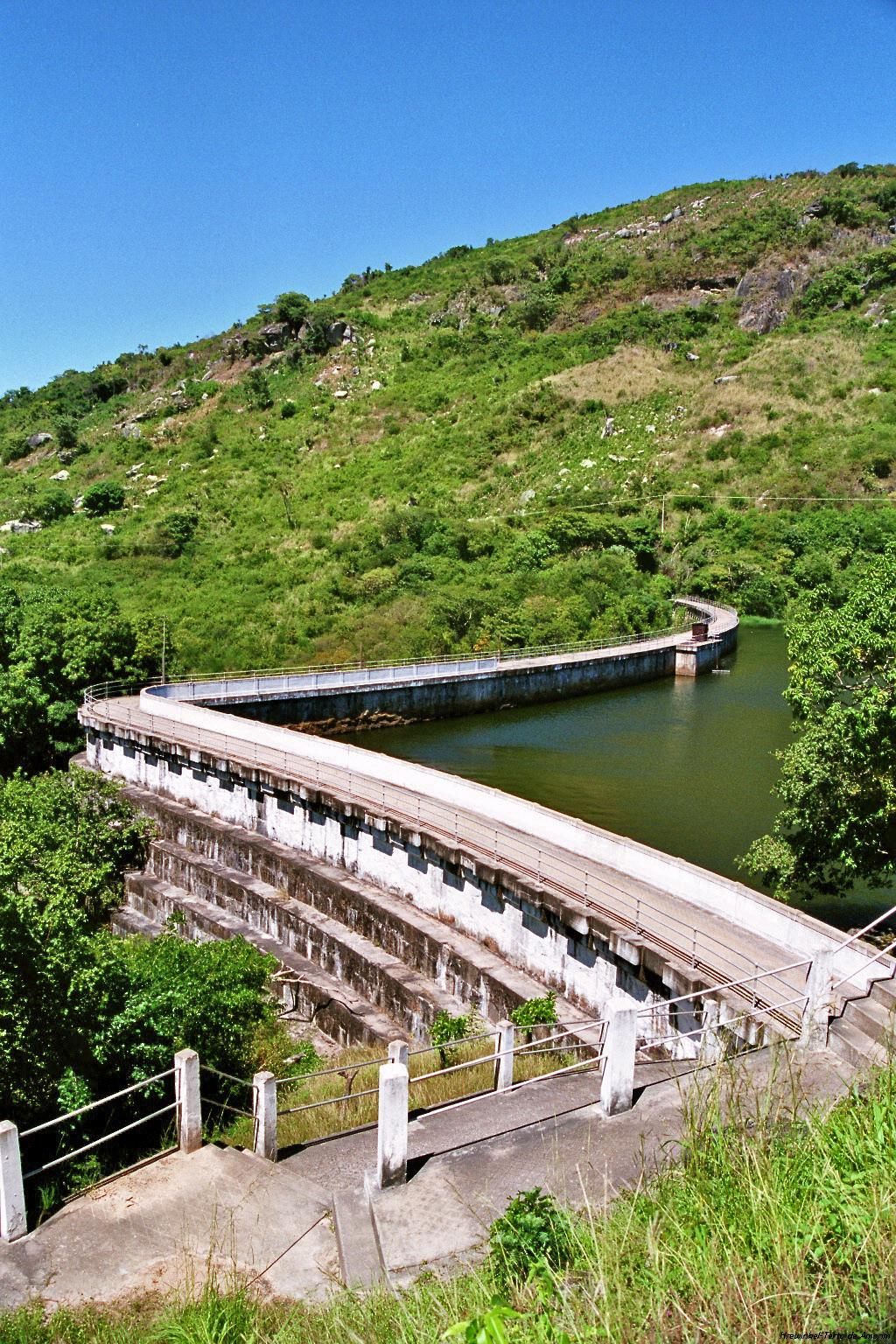
Acarape do Meio Lake

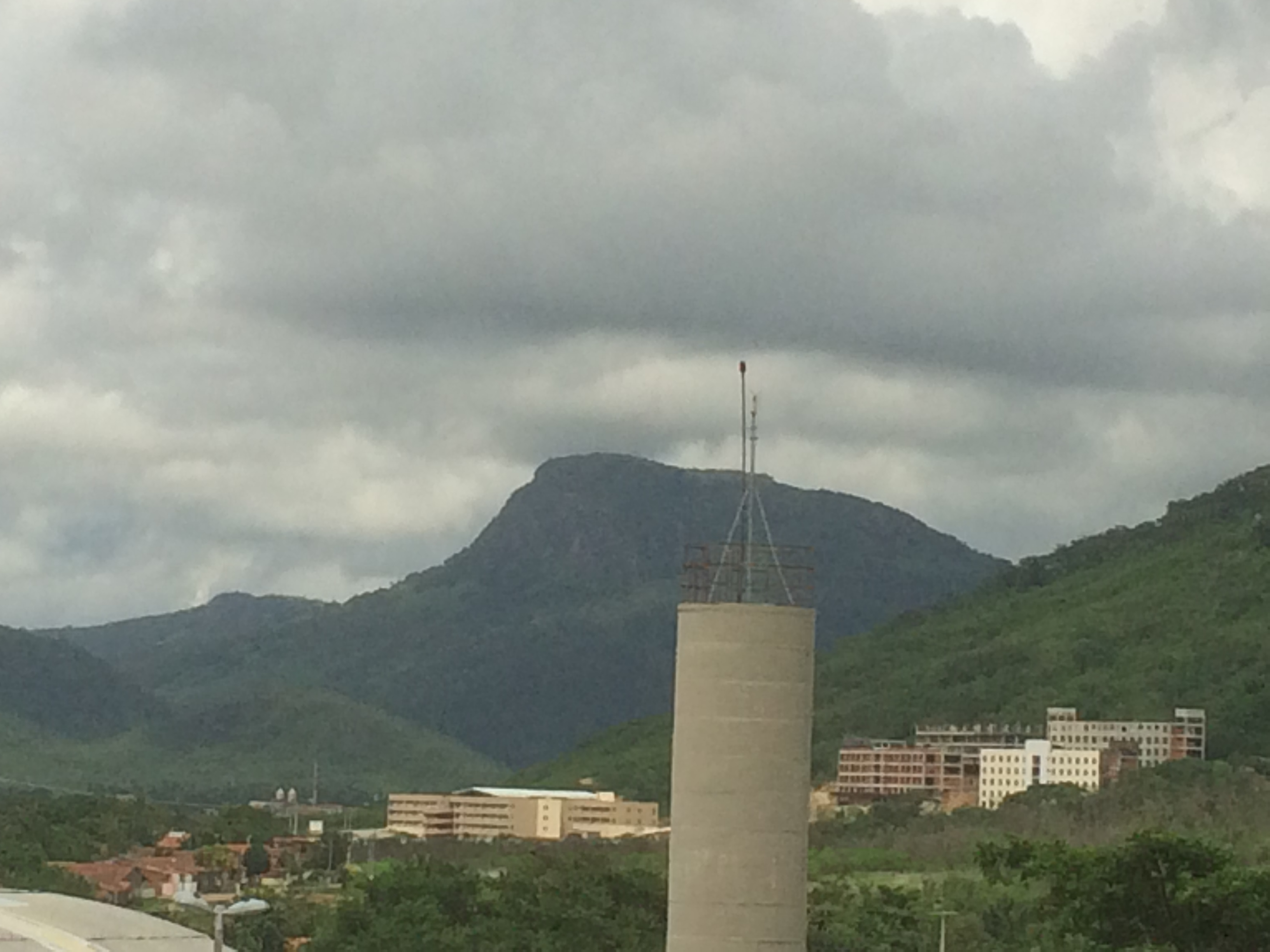
Auroras Campus of UNILAB

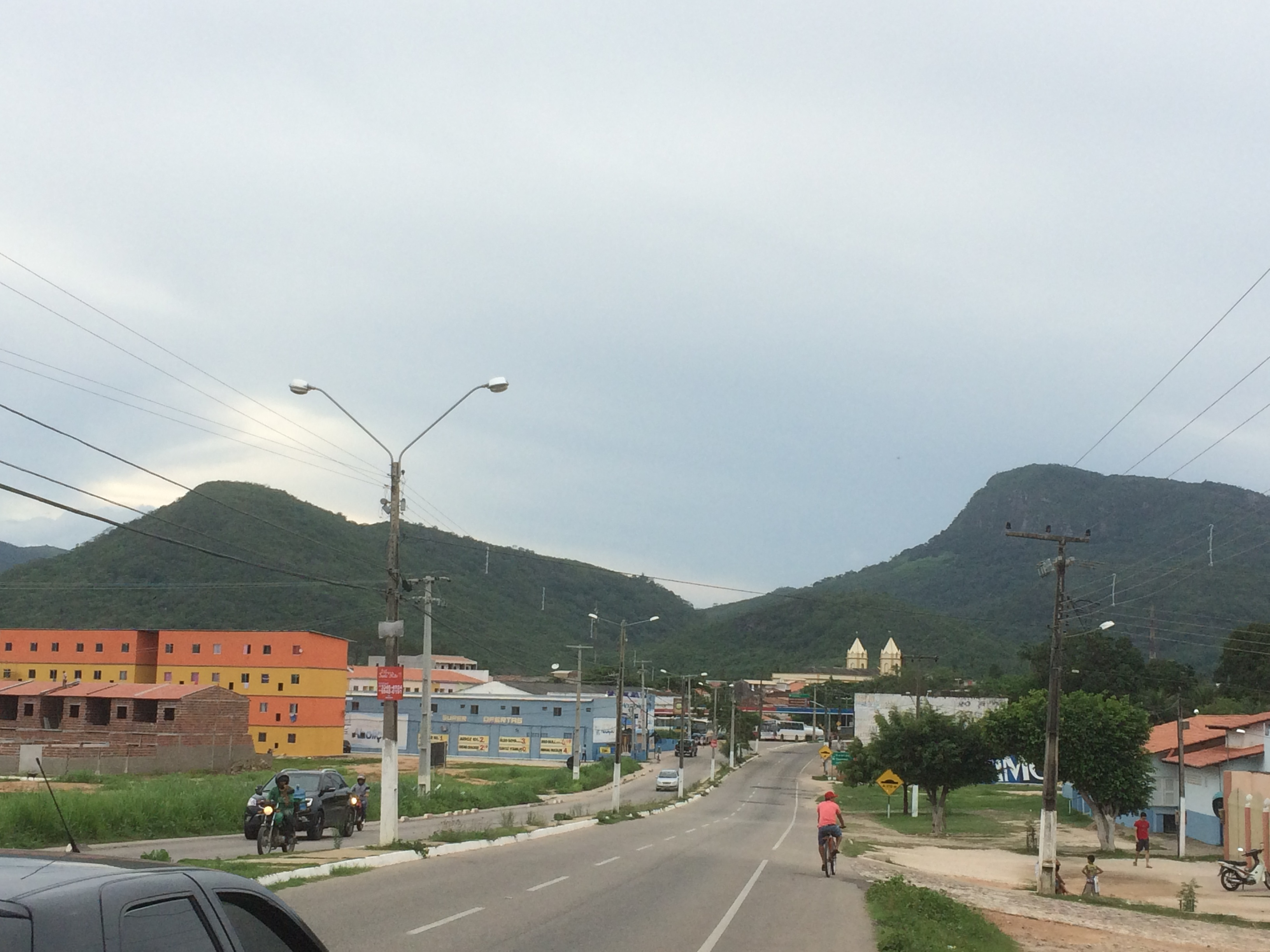
Road in Redenção

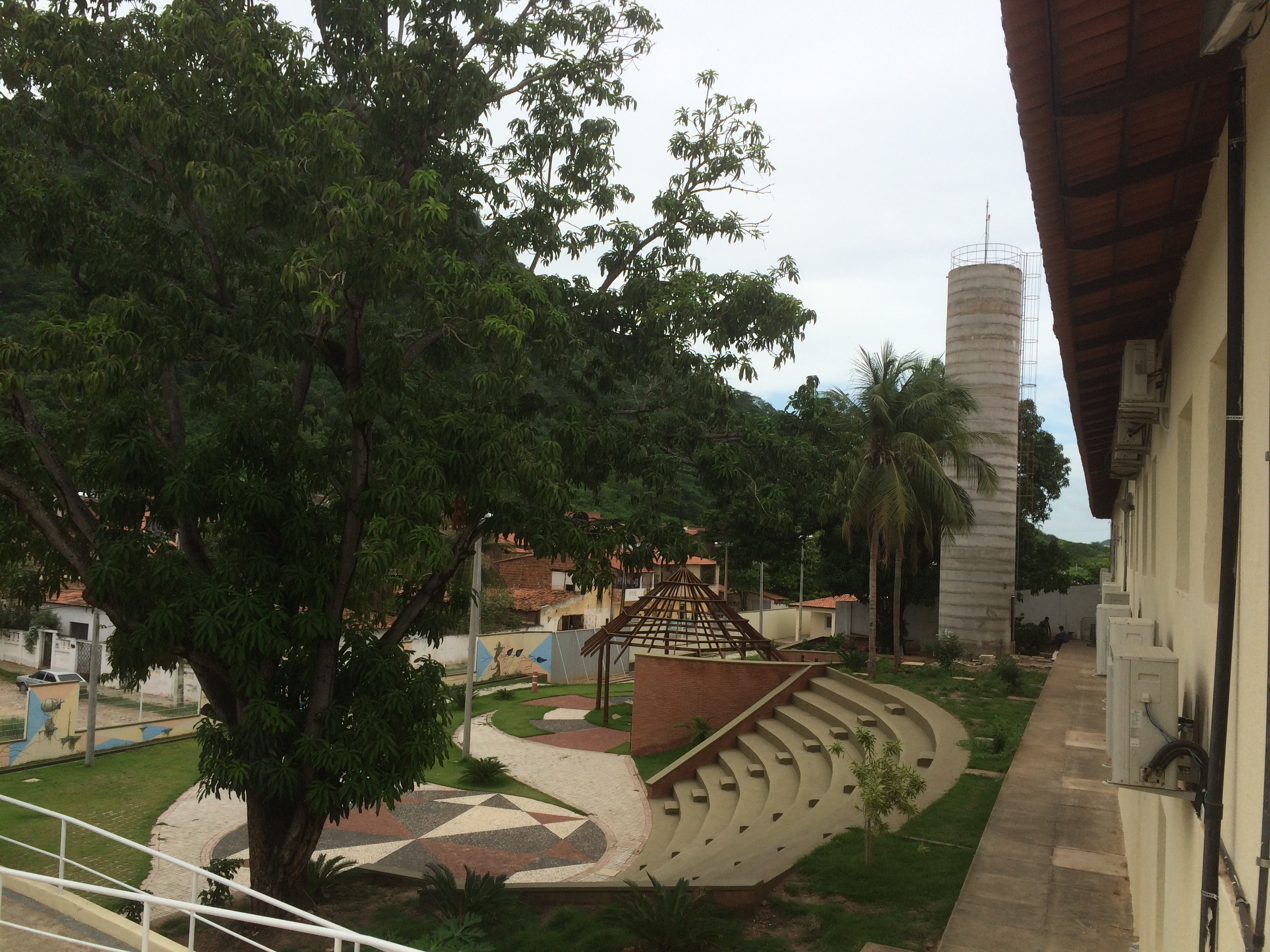
Liberdade Campus of UNILAB

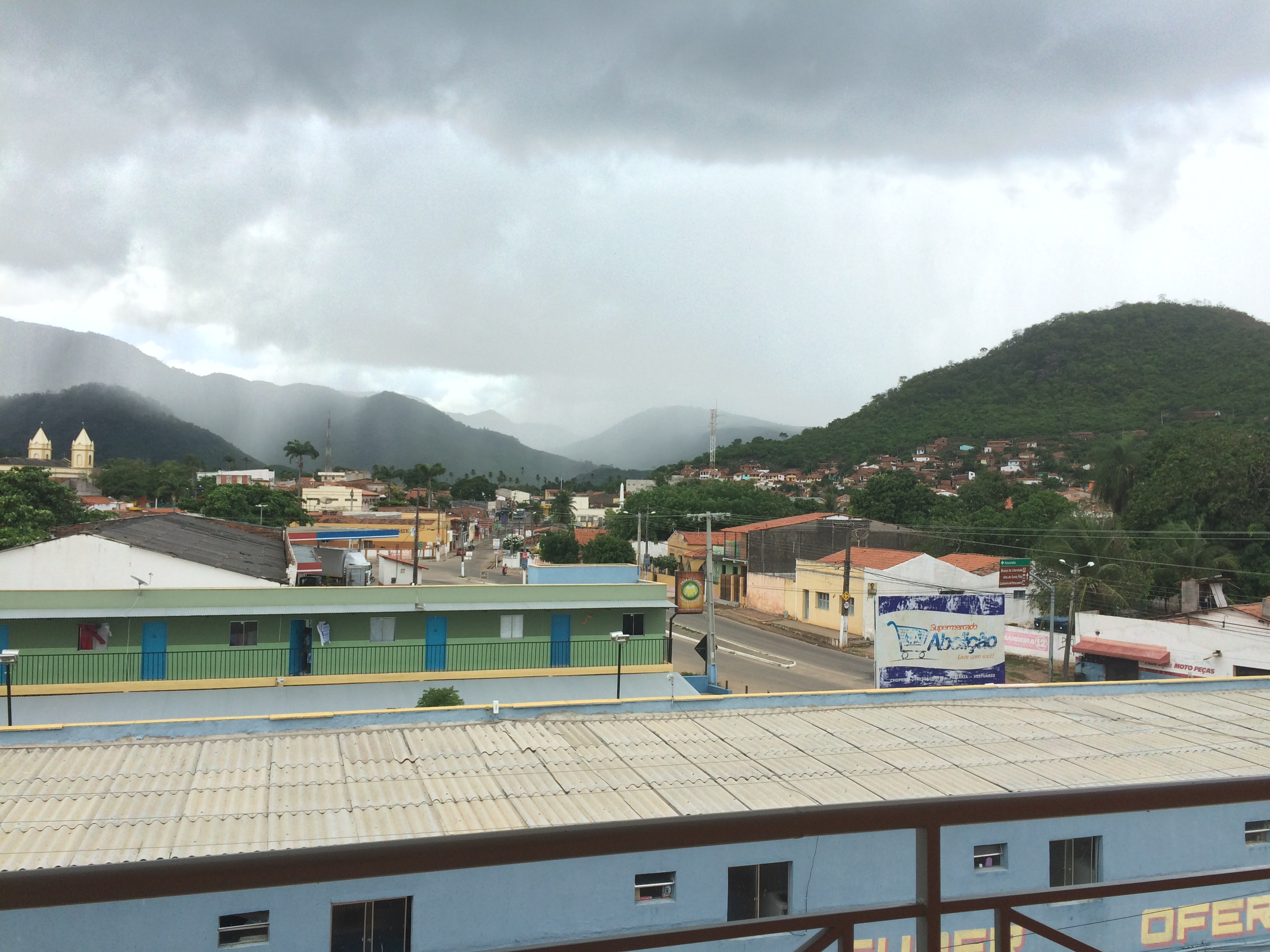
Redenção from above

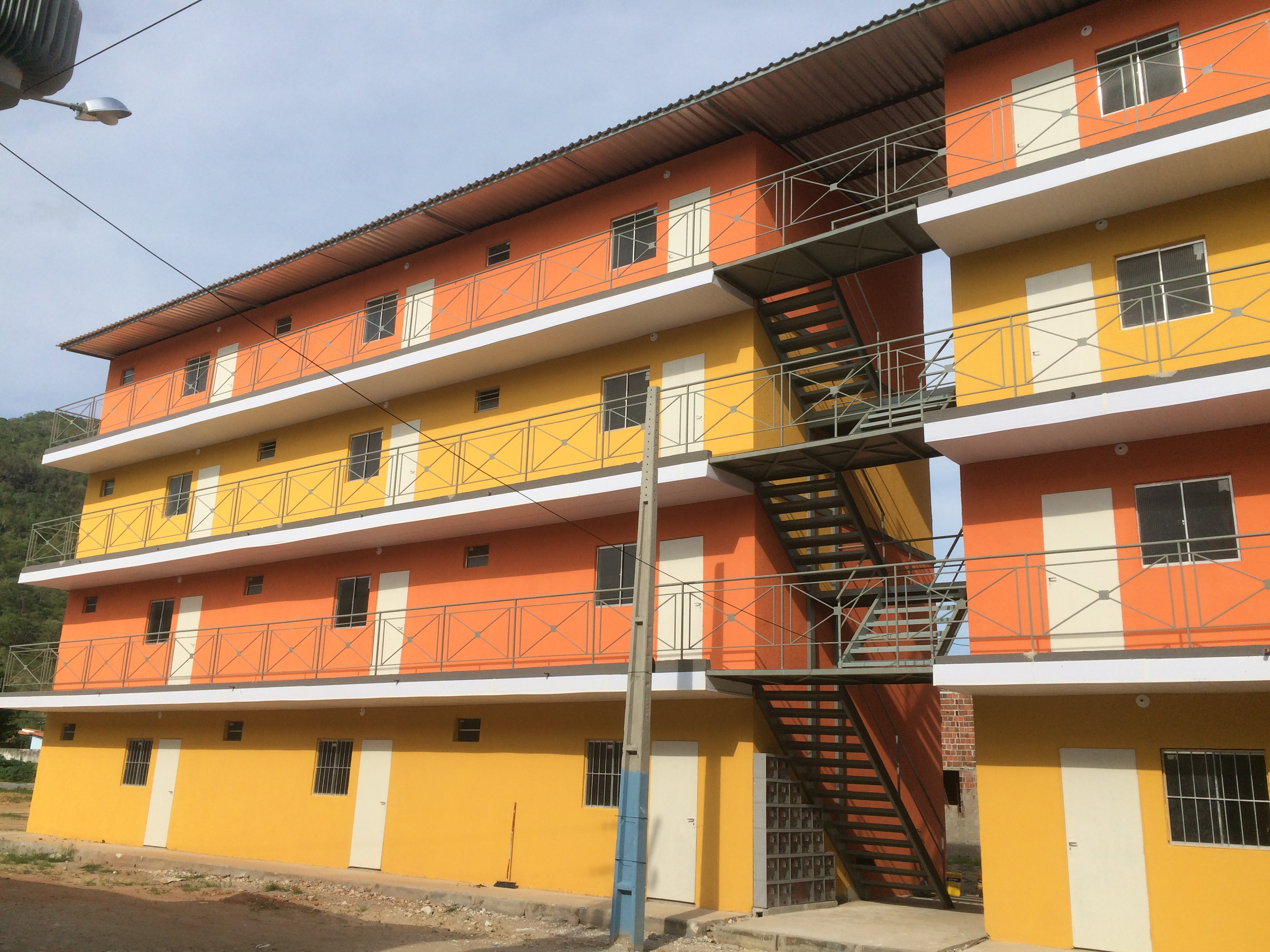
Residential Building

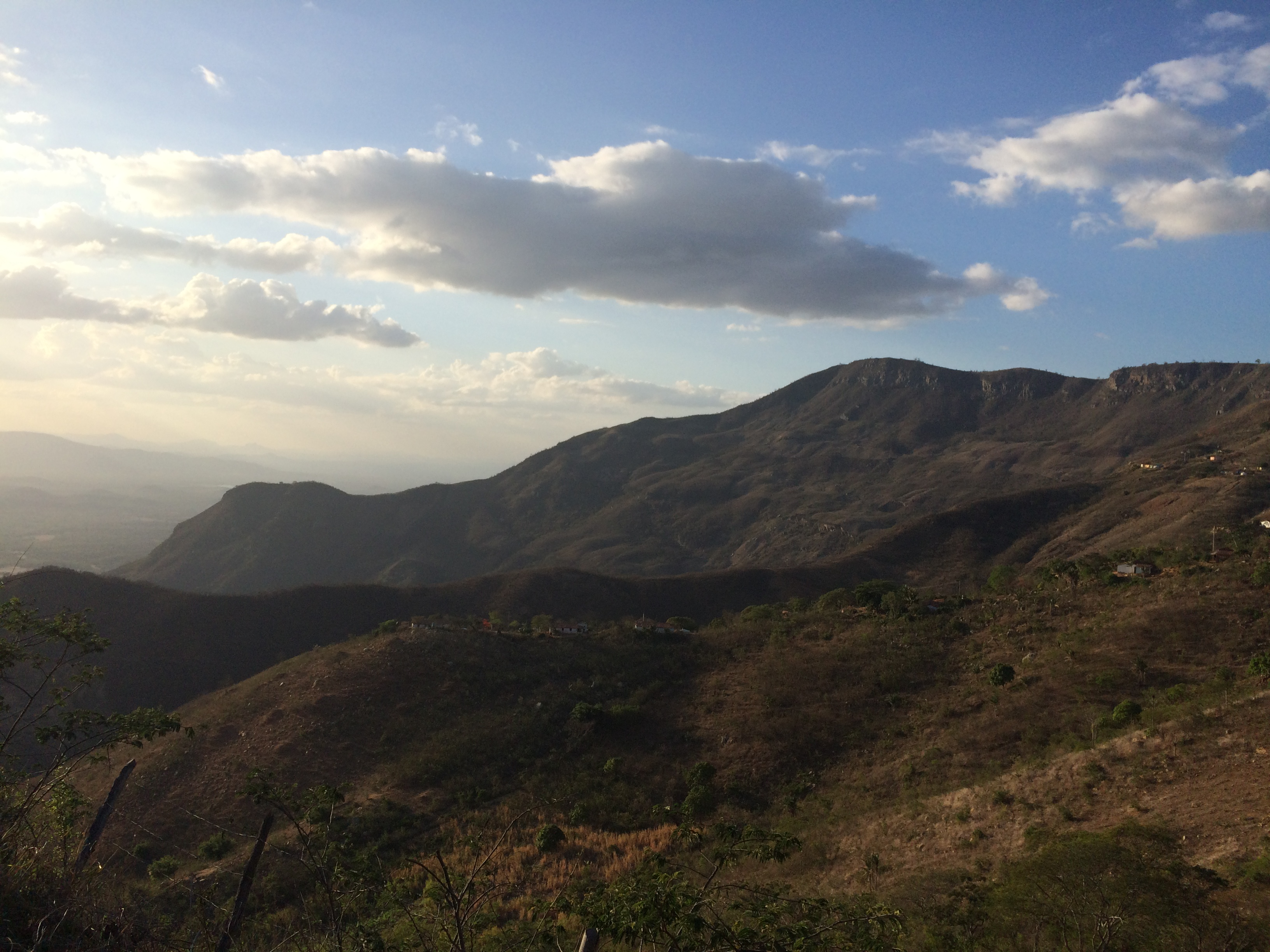
Nature around the city

== See also ==
- List of municipalities in Ceará
- Universidade da Integração Internacional da Lusofonia Afro-Brasileira (UNILAB)
- Fortaleza
