= Diocese of Baturité =

Catholic diocese in Brazil

Diocese of Baturité Diœcesis Baturitensis

Catholic
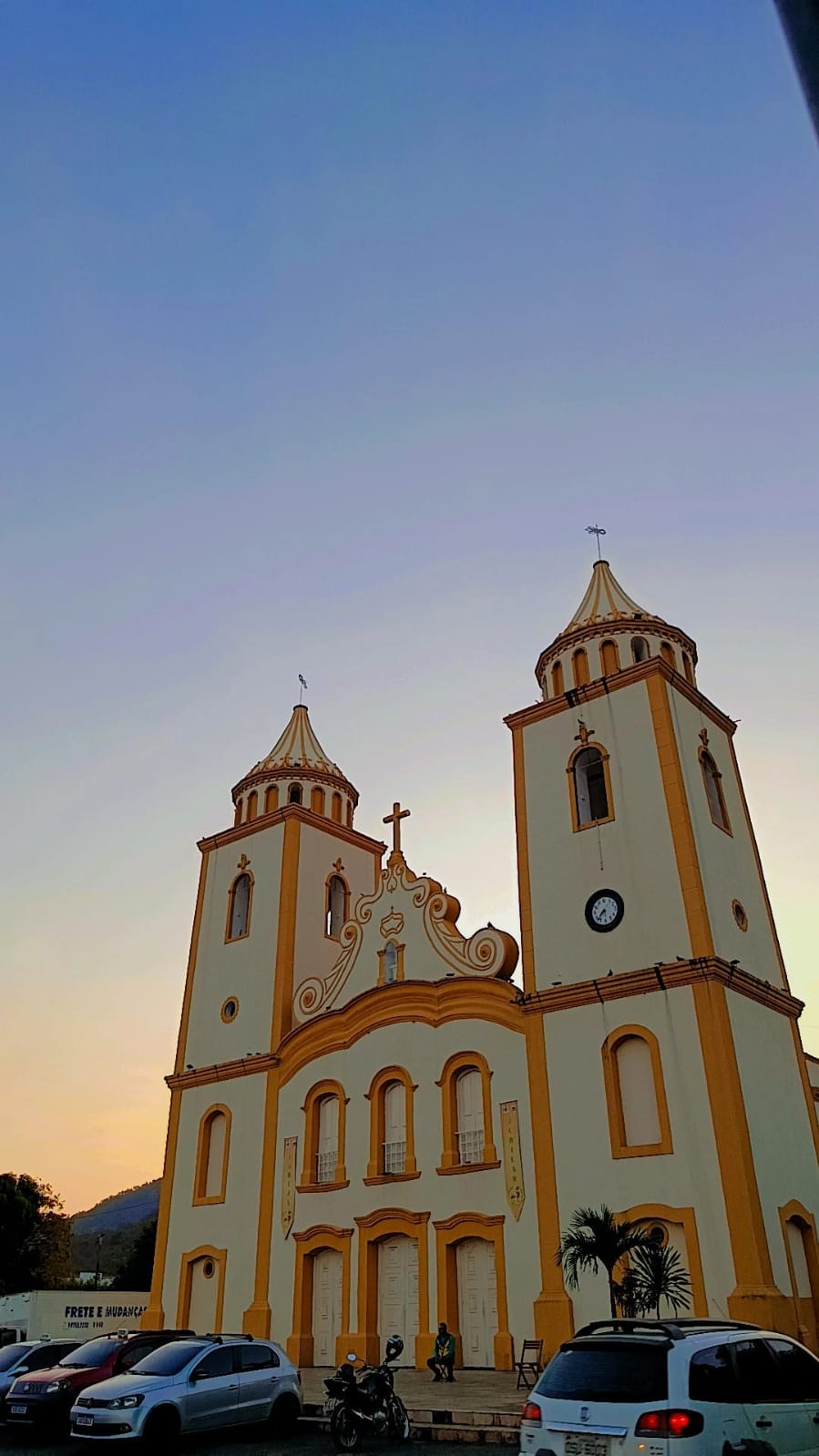
- Church of Our Lady of the Palm, now elevated to a cathedral

Location
- Country: Brazil

Statistics
- Population: Total; Catholics: 298,221; 205,770 (69%)
- Parishes: 21

Information
- Denomination: Catholic
- Sui iuris church: Latin Church
- Rite: Roman Rite
- Established: January 1st, 2026
- Archdiocese: Archdiocese of Fortaleza
- Cathedral: Church of Our Lady of the Palm
- Patron saint: Our Lady of the Palm
- Secular priests: 39
- Language: Brazilian Portuguese

Current leadership
- Pope: Pope Leo XIV
- Bishop: Luís Gonzaga Silva Pepeu

The Diocese of Baturité is a diocese of the Catholic Church located in the Brazilian city of Baturité, in the ecclesiastical province of the Archdiocese of Fortaleza. Its current bishop is Luís Gonzaga Silva Pepeu, O.F.M. Cap. and the providencial cathedral is the Church of Our Lady of the Palm.

The diocese covers 14 municipalities and 21 parishes, served by 39 priests. The diocese's population is around 298,221 people, with 69% of baptized Catholics (2025).

== History ==
The Baturité Parish has origins traced to the 18th century, when the region was still significantly populated by the Kanindé people. The parish of Our Lady of the Palm was canonically erected on June 19, 1762, being part of the Archdiocese of Olinda.

With the creation of the Archdiocese of Fortaleza, in 1854, the parish had its jurisdiction moved to the newly created diocese, being subordinated to it until 2026. Throughout the 19th and 20th centuries, the presence of the Portuguese and their descendents in the region intensified, together with the development of agricultural activities, specially coffee.

Nowadays, the newly created Diocese has the largest franciscan church outside Europe, the Basilica of Saint Francis of the Wounds, with origins in the Brazilian Empire.

In more recent times, the Baturité municipality experienced an expressive commercial and tourism growth, and counts with two parishes and numerous ecclesial communities.

Until its creation, the Episcopal Regions Serra and Sertão were part of the Archdiocese of Fortaleza; of the union of these two regions was born the Diocese of Baturité. Its territory now envelops 7,702 km^{2} and 14 municipalities in the state of Ceará: Acarape, Aracoiaba, Aratuba, Barreira, Canindé, Caridade, Guaramiranga, Mulungu, Ocara, Pacoti, Palmácia, Paramoti and Redenção. The Diocese is made of 21 parishes, with the city of Canindé concentrating most of them (4 parishes).

Since 2015, per occasion of the 100th anniversary of the Archdiocese of Fortaleza, the wish for the creation of a new diocese to listen more closely to the inhabitants of the region was growing. The arrival of the benedictine Dom Gregório Paixão as the new archbishop of Fortaleza revilatized the perspective and accelerated the process.

With support of the bishops of the CNBB's Regional Nordeste I, the project for a new diocese was sent to the Holy See in 2025, being accepted on January 1, 2026. Pope Leo XIV assigned the franciscan Dom Luís Gonzaga Silva Pepeu as its first bishop.

== Bishops ==
	Name	Period	Notes
1º	Luís Gonzaga Silva Pepeu, OFM Cap.	2026 -	
