= Canindé =

Canindé may mean:

Geography

- Canindé, Ceará, a municipality in the state of Ceará, Northeast region, Brazil
- Canindé de São Francisco, a municipality in the state of Sergipe, Northeast region, Brazil
- Conceição do Canindé, a municipality in the state of Piauí, Northeast region, Brazil
- Cristinápolis, a municipality in the state of Sergipe, Northeast region, Brazil, and sometimes called Canindé de Cristinápolis
- Canindé River (disambiguation), any of several rivers with this name (in both Brazil and Ecuador)

Animals

- Canindé (goat), a Brazilian breed related to the Chué goat
- Blue-throated macaw (Ara glaucogularis, formerly Ara caninde)
- Blue-and-yellow macaw (Ara ararauna), which are sometimes called "arara-canindé" in Portuguese

Other

- Estádio do Canindé (Estádio Oswaldo Teixeira Duarte), a stadium in the Canindé neighborhood of São Paulo, Brazil
- Francisco Canindé Palhano, Bishop of the Roman Catholic Diocese of Bonfim since 2006
- Márcio Caetano Alves (b. 1980), a Brazilian football (soccer) player known as Canindé
- Kanindés or Canindés, an indigenous people now in the municipalities of Aratuba and Canindé, Ceará, Northeast region, Brazil
- Jenipapos-Kanindés or Genipaps-canindés, an indigenous people now in the municipality of Aquiraz, Ceará, Northeast region, Brazil

== See also ==
- Canindé River (disambiguation)
