= Diocese of Amargosa =

Catholic ecclesiastical territory

Coordinates: 13.0324°S 39.6037°W

Diocese of Amargosa Dioecesis Amargosensis

Catholic

Location
- Country: Brazil
- Ecclesiastical province: São Salvador da Bahia

Statistics
- Area: 13,380 km^{2} (5,170 sq mi)
- Population: Total; Catholics: (as of 2004); 552,042; 537,000 (97.3%)

Information
- Rite: Roman Rite
- Established: 10 May 1941 (85 years ago)
- Cathedral: Catedral Nossa Senhora do Bom Con

Current leadership
- Pope: Leo XIV
- Bishop elect: Juraci Gomes de Oliveira
- Metropolitan Archbishop: Sérgio da Rocha
- Bishops emeritus: João Nílton dos Santos Souza

The Roman Catholic Diocese of Amargosa (Latin: Dioecesis Amargosensis) is a diocese located in the city of Amargosa in the ecclesiastical province of São Salvador da Bahia in Brazil.

== History ==
- 10 May 1941: Established as Diocese of Amargosa from the Metropolitan Archdiocese of São Salvador da Bahia

== Leadership ==
Bishops of Amargosa

- Floréncio Cicinho Vieira (11 April 1942 – 11 January 1969)
- Alair Vilar Fernandes de Melo (17 March 1970 – 6 April 1988), appointed Archbishop of Natal, Rio Grande do Norte
- João Nílton dos Santos Souza (31 August 1988 – 10 June 2015)
- Valdemir Ferreira dos Santos (1 May 2016 – 18 August 2021), appointed Bishop of Penedo
- Juraci Gomes de Oliveira (31 May 2023 – present)

Other priests of this diocese who became bishop

- Walfrido Teixeira Vieira, appointed Auxiliary Bishop of São Salvador da Bahia in 1961
