= Juraci Gomes de Oliveira =

Dom Juraci Gomes de Oliveira
- Bishop of Amargosa
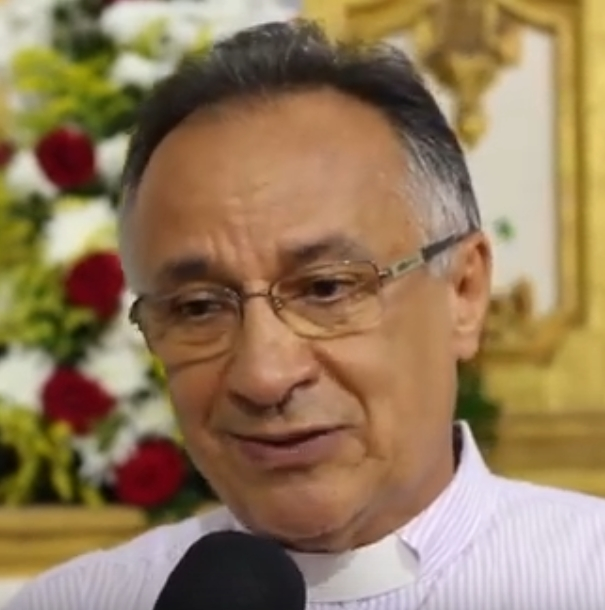
- Juraci Gomes de Oliveira in 2018
- Church: Latin Church
- Diocese: Diocese of Amargosa
- Installed: May 31, 2023

Orders
- Ordination: November 3, 1990
- Consecration: July 29, 2023 by Cardinal Sérgio da Rocha

Personal details
- Born: August 19, 1956 (age 70) Catolé do Rocha, Paraíba, Brazil
- Denomination: Catholic
- Education: Catholic University of Pernambuco; Pontifical John Paul II Institute for Studies on Marriage and Family
- Coat of arms

Juraci Gomes de Oliveira (born August 19, 1956) is a Brazilian Catholic prelate who has served as the bishop of Amargosa since May 31, 2023.

== Biography ==
Juraci Gomes de Oliveira joined the Joseleitos de Cristo, a religious institute in Brazil. He studied philosophy and theology at the Catholic University of Pernambuco. He received his diaconate ordination on August 12, 1990, by Bishop Mário Zanetta and was ordained a priest by Bishop Jackson Berenguer Prado on November 3 of the same year at the Church of Senhora Sant'Ana, Tucano. He incardinated into the Archdiocese of São Salvador da Bahia in 1991.

Juraci Gomes de Oliveira had his further education at Pontifical John Paul II Institute for Studies on Marriage and Family in Salvador da Bahia, where he earned a licentiate in marriage and family studies. He had held positions in the archdiocese, among them, working as parish dean, episcopal vicar and seminary's spiritual director. He became a professor at the Catholic University of Salvador and the moderator of the archdiocesan curia. He was the vicar general of Archdiocese before his appointment as bishop of Amargosa by Pope Francis on May 31, 2023. He was consecrated by Cardinal Sérgio da Rocha on July 29 of the same year in Cathedral Basilica of Salvador. The co-consecrators were Archbishops Josafá Menezes da Silva and Luís Gonzaga Silva Pepeu.
