= Basilica of Saint Francis of the Wounds =

- Paróquia Santuário e Basílica de São Francisco das Chagas
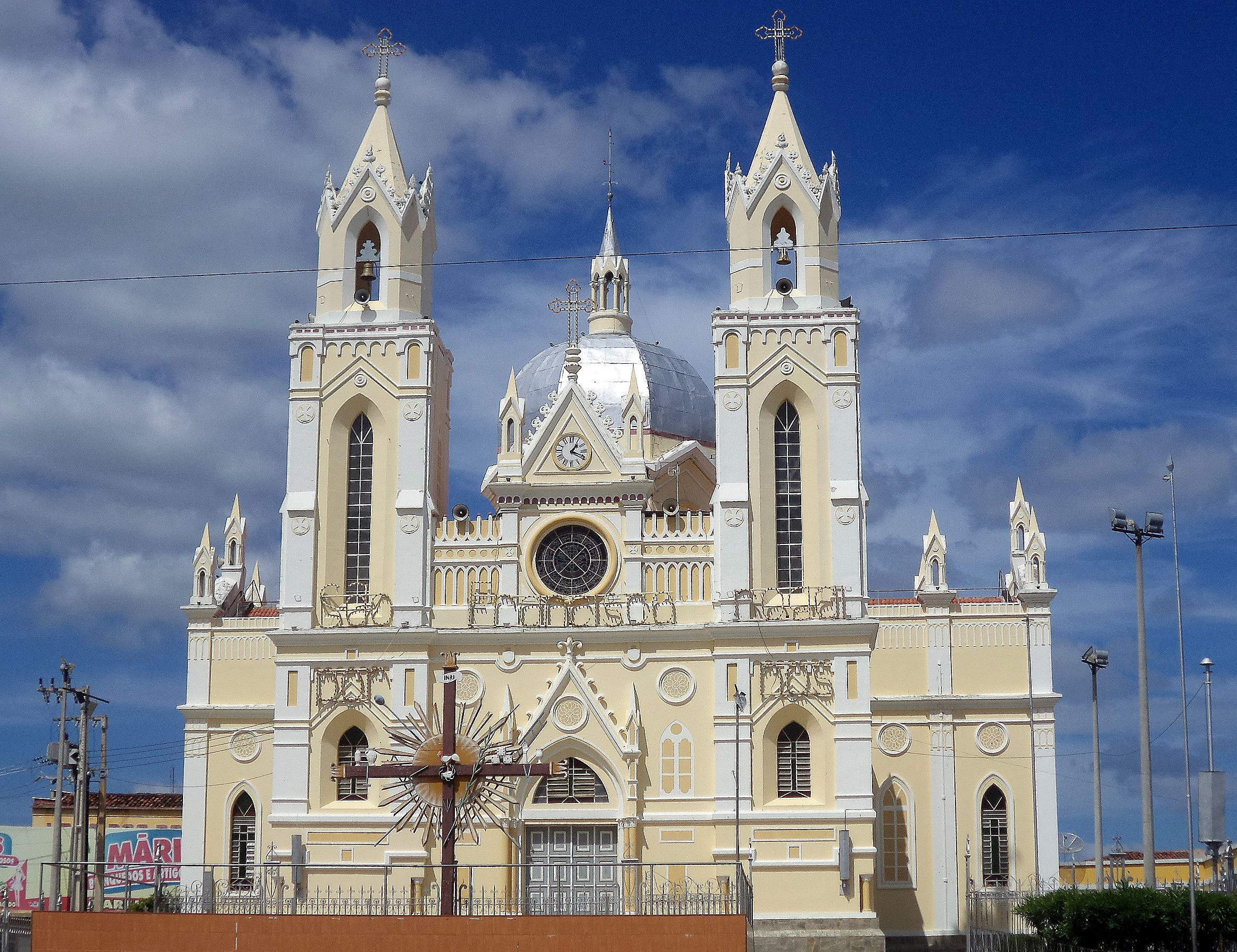
- The Basilica's façade
- Interactive map of the Basilica of Saint Francis of the Wounds area
- Alternative names: Paróquia Santuário de São Francisco das Chagas

General information
- Type: Basilica
- Architectural style: Baroque architecture Neogothic
- Location: Canindé, Ceará, Brazil
- Coordinates: 4°21′0″S 39°18′36″W
- Construction started: 1775
- Completed: 1796
- Owner: Capuchins

Website
- santuariodecaninde.com

The Parish Sanctuary and Basilica of Saint Francis of the Wounds is a Catholic sanctuary dedicated to Francis of Assisi at the municipality of Canindé, in the Brazilian state of Ceará. The church is around 110 km distant from Fortaleza, being administered by Franciscan friars of the Franciscan Province of Santo Antônio do Brasil.

== History ==
=== Construction (1775-1796) ===
The history of the sanctuary can be traced to the 18th century, with a small account of the church's construction, initiated around 1775 by one Francisco Xavier de Medeiros, a Portuguese soldier. The account attributes to Medeiros the building of two churches in the region, now located in Canindé and Baturité.

The works, although, were prolonged, with no written record to justify the delay. A local legend justifies it by narrating a feud over the area of the future church, solved by intervention of Saint Francis himself.

In addition to the supposed terrain feud, the droughts in the region in the end of the century (1777 and 1792–1793) delayed the construction even more — in 1787, twelve years after the construction's first brick, the terrain's charter still mentions a "church that [people] want to build to Saint Francis of the Wounds". The earliest account of a religious service in the church is dated to 1796.

=== 20th century ===
In the beginning of the 20th century, more specifically, between the years of 1910 and 1915, the structure went through numerous renovations, enlarging the building and allowing a larger number of faithful inside. In the present, the church consolidated in an architectural style that blends baroque and neogothic elements.

On November 30, 1925, the parish sanctuary was elevated, by papal decree, to a minor basilica.

=== 21st century ===
After the creation of the Diocese of Baturité in 2026 by Pope Leo XIV, the sanctuary went under the jurisdiction of the new ecclesiastical territory.

== See also ==
- Diocese of Baturité
