= Canindé River =

Canindé River may refer to rivers:

in Brazil

- Canindé River (Ceará)
- Canindé River (Piauí)

in Ecuador

- Canindé River (Ecuador)

== See also ==
- Canindé (disambiguation)
