= Luís Gonzaga Silva Pepeu =

Brazilian Catholic prelate

Dom Luís Gonzaga Silva Pepeu
- Archbishop-Bishop of Baturité
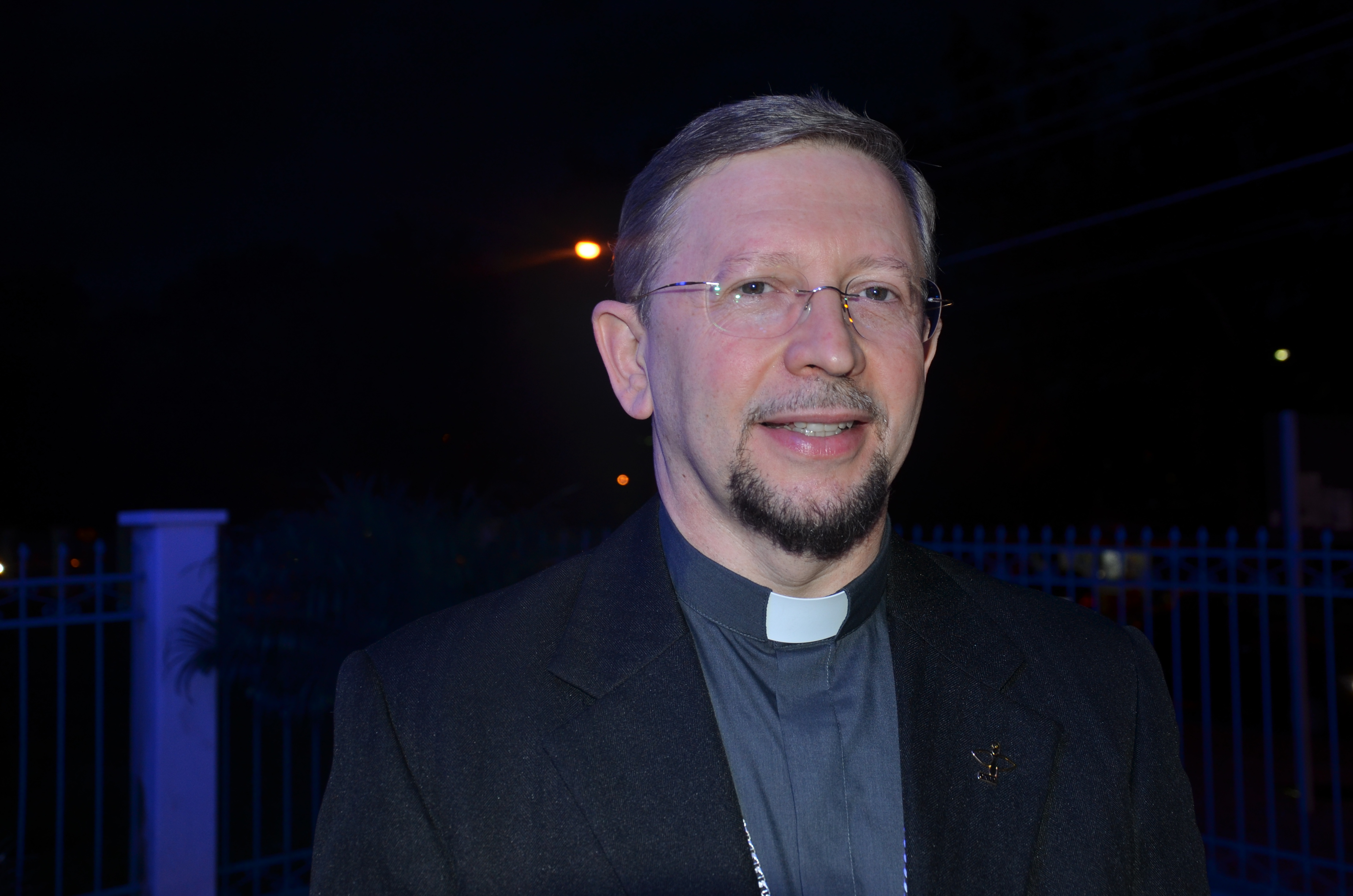
- Church: Latin Church
- Archdiocese: Archdiocese of Fortaleza
- Diocese: Diocese of Baturité
- Installed: January 1, 2026
- Predecessor: newly established

Orders
- Ordination: December 8, 1982
- Consecration: October 6, 2001 by Antônio Soares Costa

Personal details
- Born: February 18, 1957 (age 69) Caruaru, Pernambuco, Brazil
- Denomination: Catholic
- Education: Recife Institute of Theology; Catholic University of America; Pontifical University of Saint Thomas Aquinas
- Motto: NE TIMEAS TECVM SVM ("Do not fear, I'm with you")
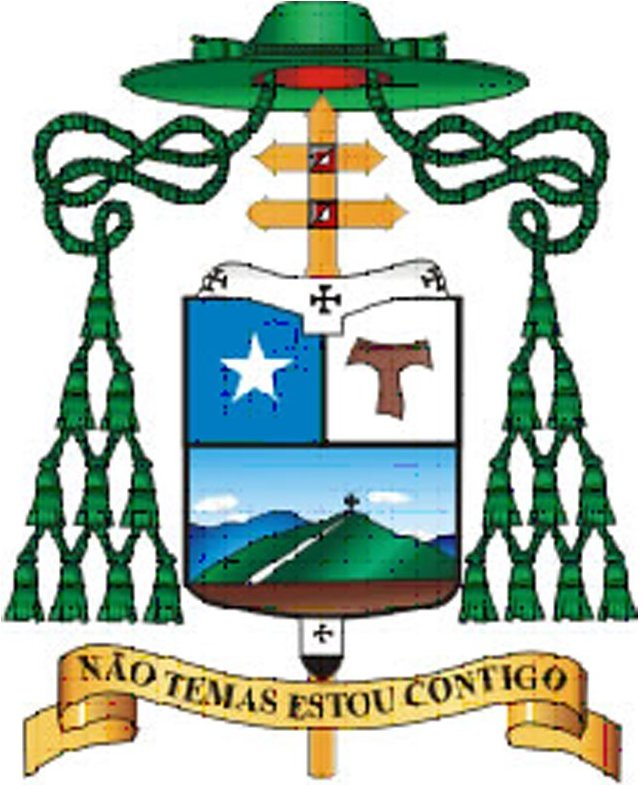
- Coat of arms

Luís Gonzaga Silva Pepeu O. F. M. Cap. (born February 18, 1957) is a Brazilian Catholic prelate who has served as the first bishop of the newly created Diocese of Baturité since 2025, when he was appointed by Pope Leo XIV. A Capuchin friar and formerly the third bishop of Afogados da Ingazeira and the second archbishop of Vitória da Conquista, he was allowed to continue using the style of archbishop even though the new diocese is not an archdiocese.

== Biography ==
Luís Gonzaga Silva Pepeu is the second child of Pedro de Souza Pepeu and Izabel Silva Pepeu. In his youth, he studied in Caruaru and Maceió. Pepeu was a Franciscan novice throughout the year of 1977, in Vitória da Conquista, and professed his vows on January 17, 1978.

In 1978, Pepeu began his ecclesiastical studies in philosophy and theology for the priesthood at the Saint Francis Seminary in Nova Veneza, Sumaré, São Paulo. In 1982, concluded his theology course in the Recife Institute of Theology (Instituto de Teologia do Recife — ITER) and was ordained a priest on December 8.

In 1998, concluded his Licenciate in Canon Law at the Catholic University of America, Washington. In 2001, obtained his doctorate in the same field by the Pontifical University of Saint Thomas Aquinas (Angelicum).

== Episcopate ==
Pepeu was assigned as the third bishop of Afogados da Ingazeira by Pope John Paul II, being ordained on October 6, 2001, in Caruaru, by its bishop, Antônio Soares Costa. The main co-ordinators were Franscisco Austregésilo de Mesquita Filho, the diocese's bishop emeritus and Paulo Cardoso da Silva, OCarm, bishop of Petrolina. On October 27, 2001, Pepeu officially began his episcopate as bishop of Afogados da Ingazeira.

On June 11, 2008, Pepeu was assigned as the second metropolitan archbishop of Vitória da Conquista by Pope Benedict XVI, being sworn on September 28, 2008. He received the pallium at the Vatican few days after being assigned, in June 29. On October 9, 2019, Pepeu's resignation was accepted by Pope Francis, being succeeded by the new archbishop, Josafá Menezes da Silva.

After a sabbatical year, Pepeu was assigned as the vicar general of the Archdiocese of Olinda e Recife on May 13, 2021, occupying the role until December 27, 2023. His successor was Josivaldo José Bezerra. Pepeu also occupied the presidency of the archdiocese's Assembly for Legal Proceedings.

Pepeu was also moderator of the CNBB's Northeast Region II ecclesiastical court, president of Northeast Region III's, member of the Episcopal Commission for the Brazil-Holy See Concordat, member of CNBB's Permanent Council and member of the Episcopal Commission for the Ecclesiastical Appellate Courts.

In January 2026, became the first bishop of the Diocese of Baturité, appointed by Pope Leo XIV. His Holiness allowed Pepeu to continue using the style of archbishop as an archbishop ad personam.

== Episcopal ordinations ==
Luís Pepeu ordained the following bishops:

- Severino Batista de França, OFM Cap. (2004)
- Egidio Bisol (2010)
- Valdemir Ferreira dos Santos (2010)
- Magnus Henrique Lopes (2010)
- João Santos Cardoso (2012)
- Estevam dos Santos Silva Filho (2014)
- José Roberto Silva Carvalho (2017)
- Rubival Cabral Britto, OFM Cap. (2017)

He also co-ordained the following bishops:

- José Soares Filho, OFM Cap. (2003)
- Aldemiro Sena dos Santos (2017)
- Vitor Agnaldo de Menezes (2018)
- Juraci Gomes de Oliveira (2023)
