= Mulungu, Ceará =

Municipality in Ceará, Brazil

Coordinates: 4°18′21″S 38°59′45″W

Mulungu
- Municipality
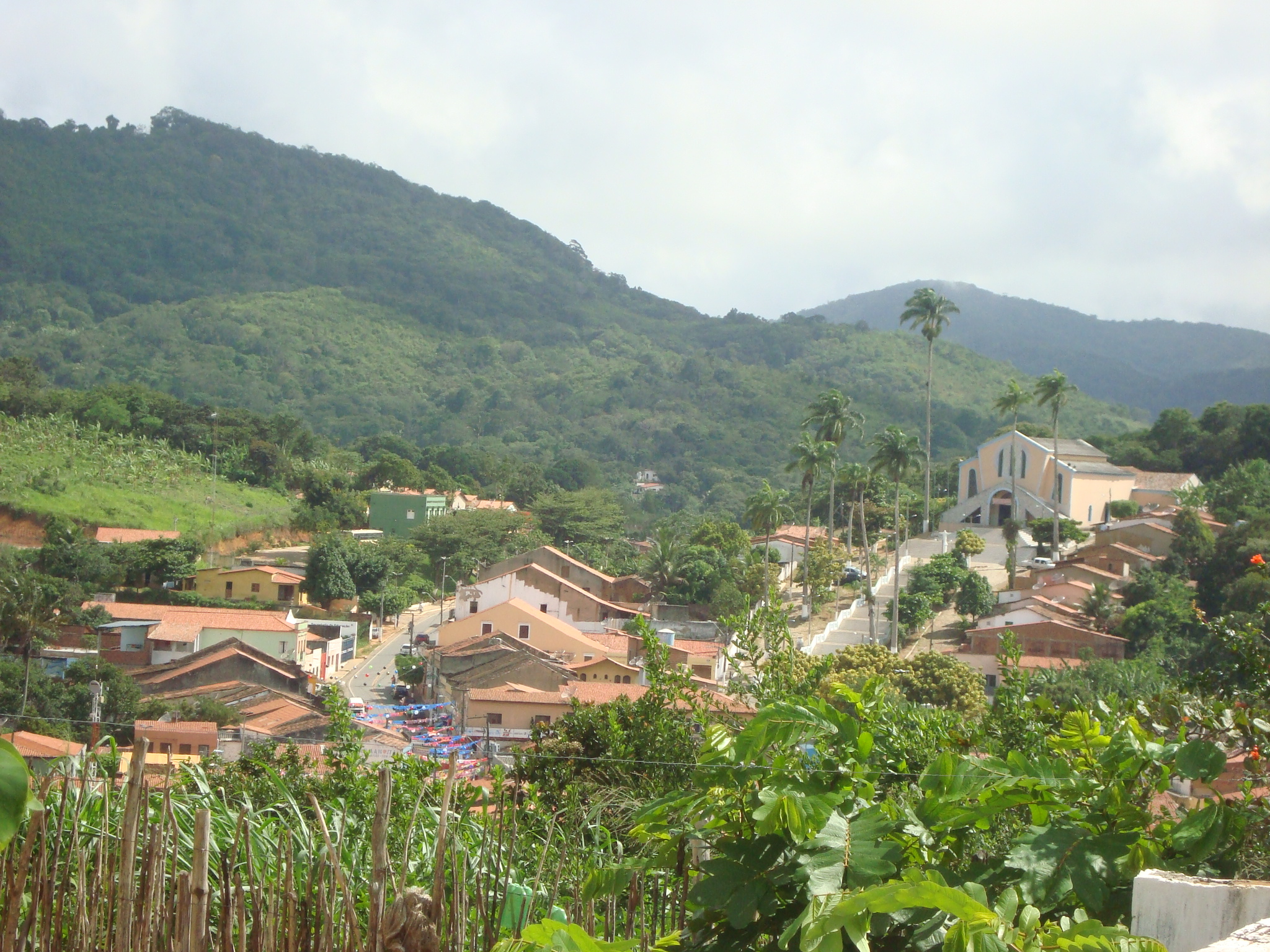
- View of Mulungu

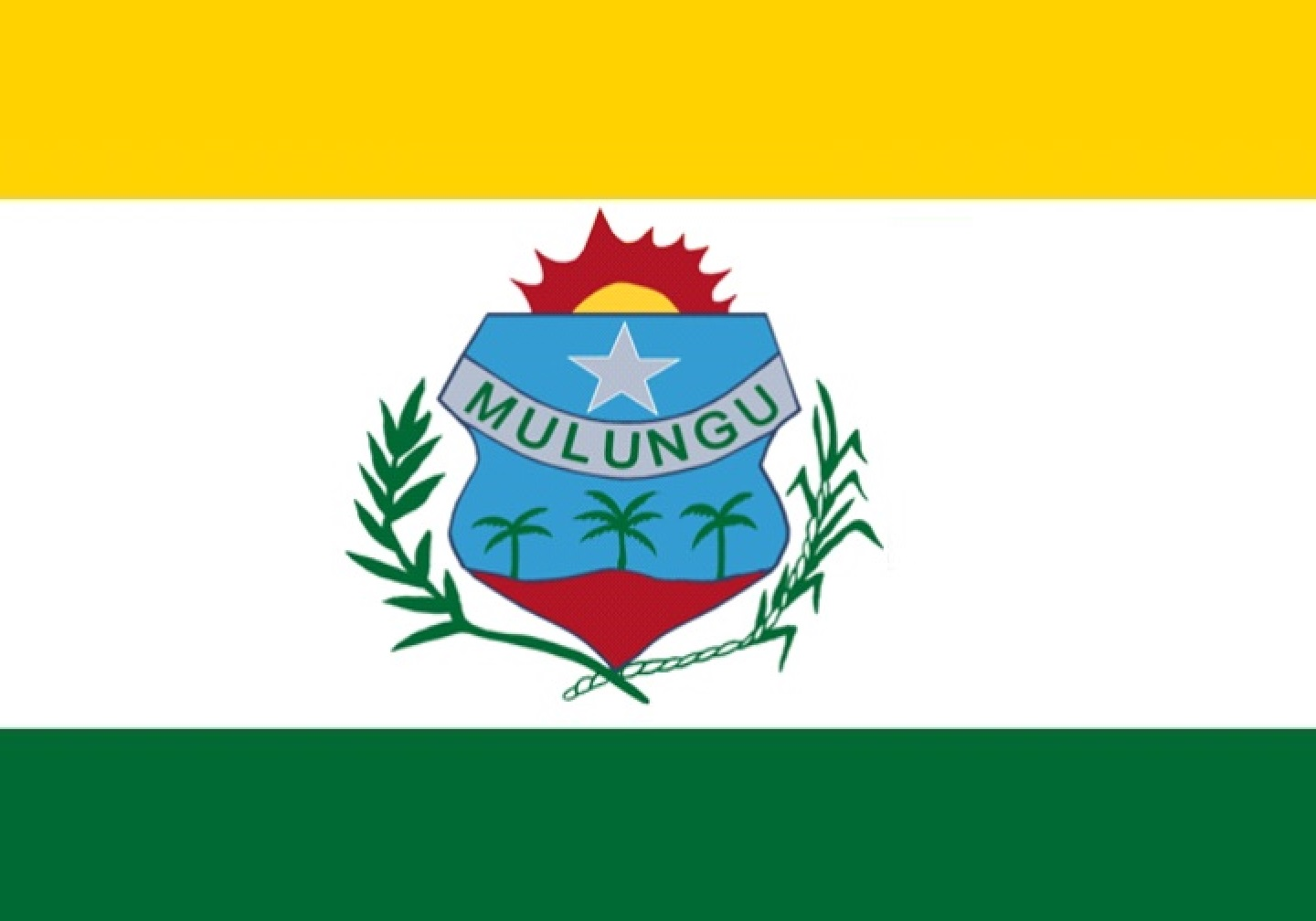
- Flag
- Interactive map of Mulungu
- Country: Brazil
- Region: Nordeste
- State: Ceará
- Mesoregion: Noroeste Cearense

Population (2020)
  - Total: 10,941
- Time zone: UTC−3 (BRT)

Mulungu, Ceará is a municipality in the state of Ceará in the Northeast region of Brazil.

Localizada na região cearense do Maciço de Baturité.
