= Pacoti =

Municipality in Ceará, Brazil

Coordinates: 4.225°S 38.9228°W

- Municipality
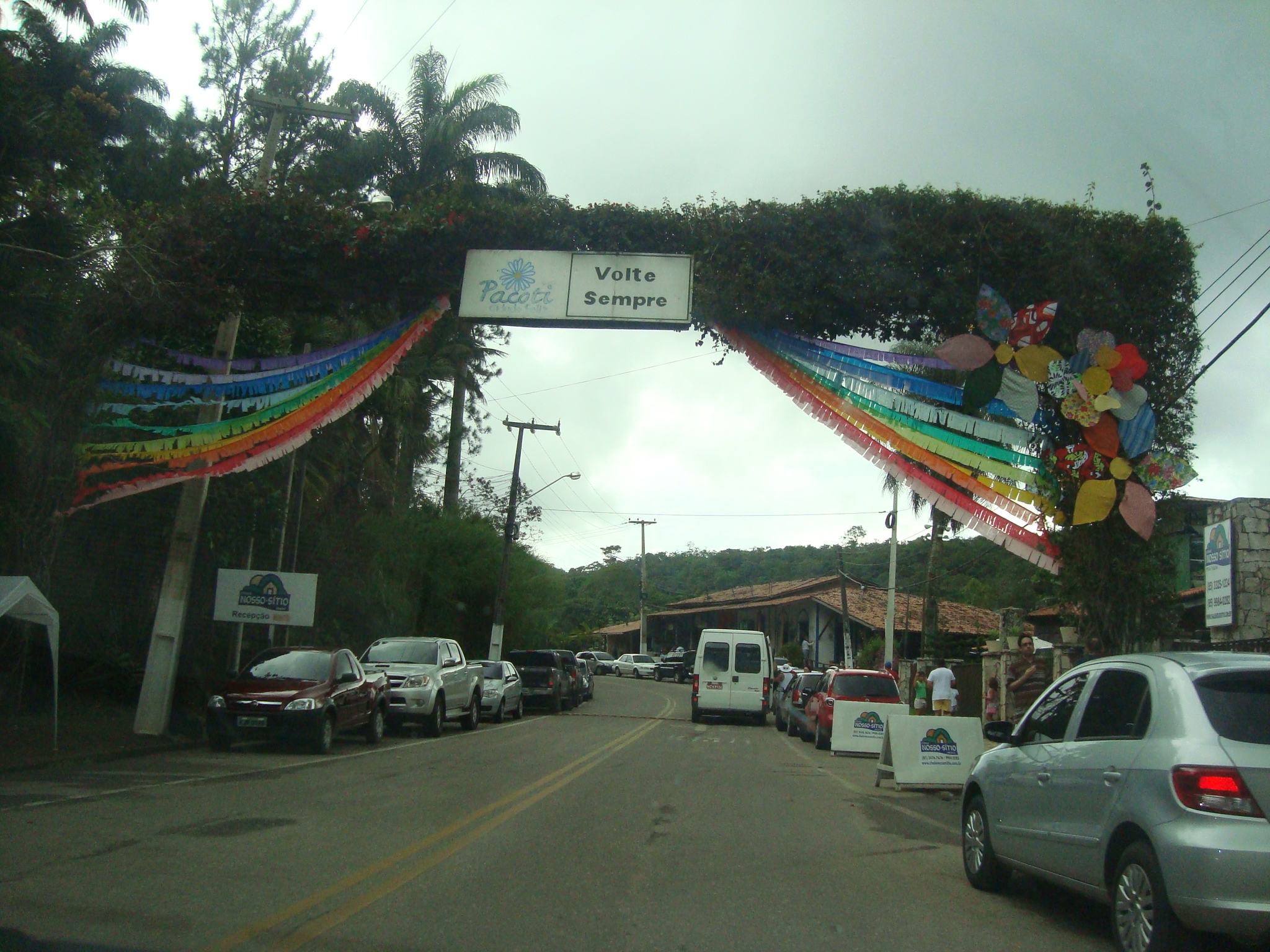

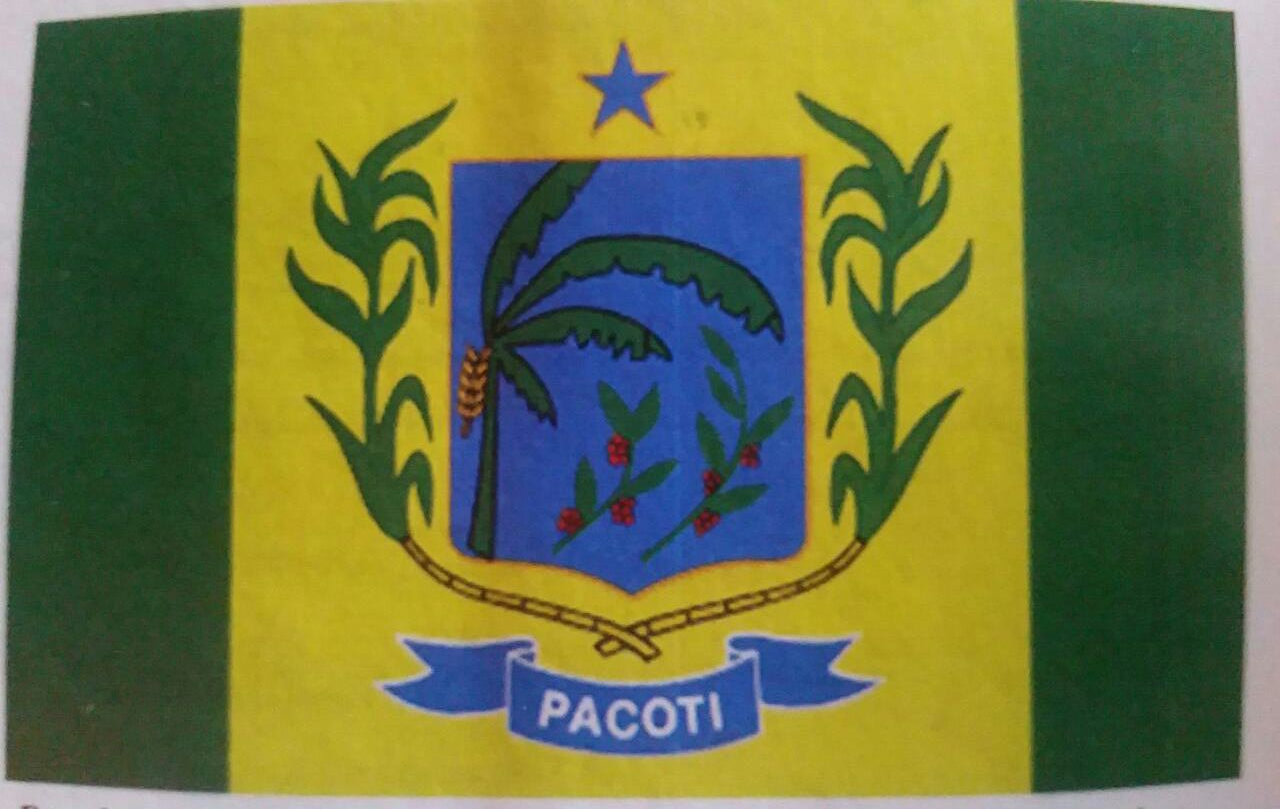
- Flag
- Interactive map of Pacoti
- Country: Brazil
- Region: Nordeste
- State: Ceará
- Mesoregion: Noroeste Cearense

Population (2020)
  - Total: 12,288
- Time zone: UTC−3 (BRT)

Pacoti is a municipality in the state of Ceará in the Northeast region of Brazil.

== See also ==
- List of municipalities in Ceará
