= Conceição do Canindé =

Coordinates: 7°54′S 41°34′W

- Municipality
- Country: Brazil
- Region: Nordeste
- State: Piauí
- Mesoregion: Sudeste Piauiense

Population (2020)
  - Total: 4,807
- Time zone: UTC−3 (BRT)

Conceição do Canindé is a municipality in the state of Piauí in the Northeast region of Brazil.

== See also ==
- List of municipalities in Piauí
