= Palmácia =

Municipality in Ceará, Brazil

Coordinates: 4°08′S 38°50′W

Palmácia Terra das Palmeiras" "Cidade das Palmeiras" "Arraial das Palmeiras" "Princesinha da Serra" "Menina Serrana
- Municipality
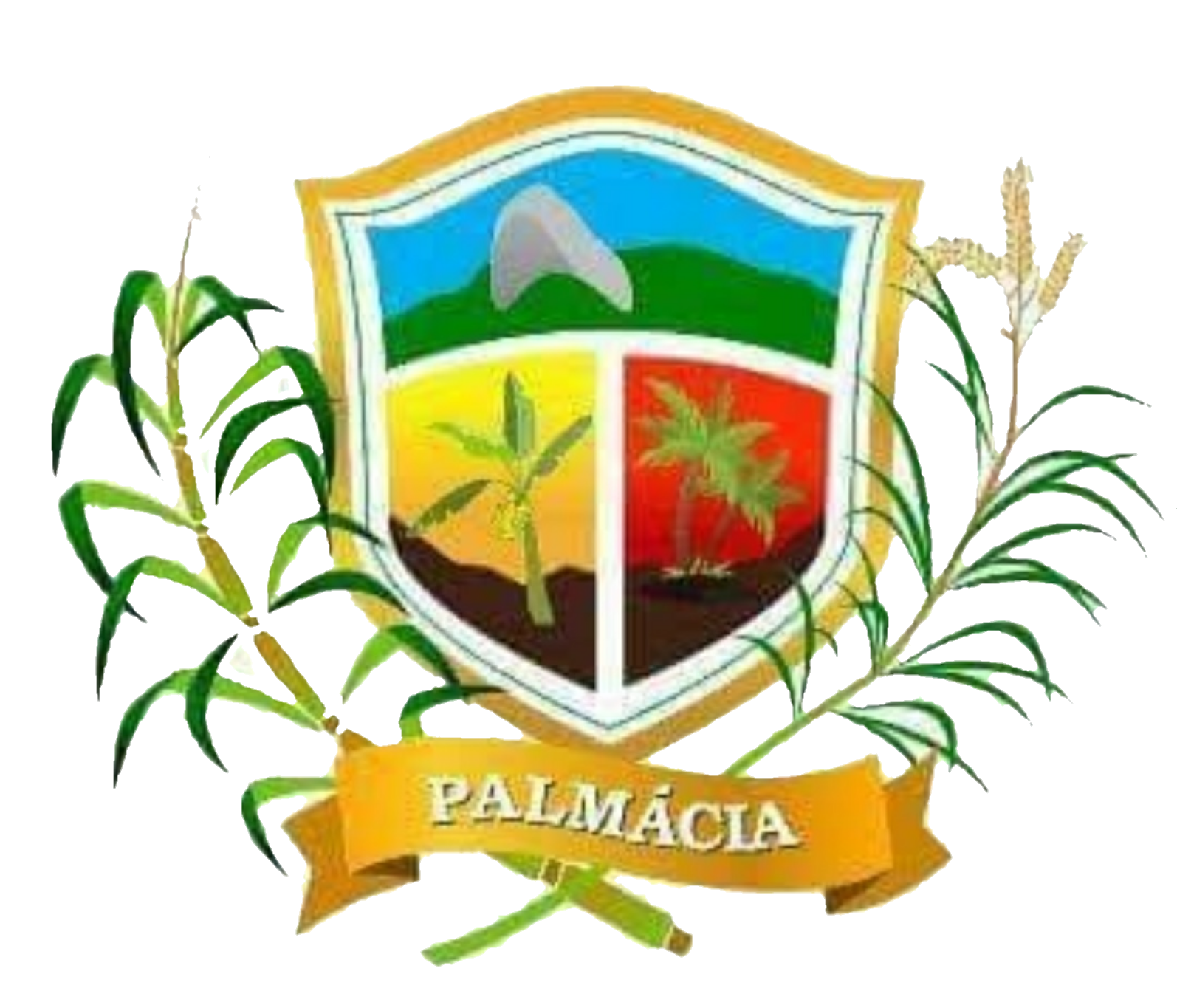
- Flag Coat of arms

- Country: Brazil
- Region: Nordeste
- State: Ceará
- Mesoregion: Noroeste Cearense

Population (2020)
  - Total: 13,439
- Time zone: UTC−3 (BRT)

Palmácia is located in the mountainous region of Ceará and stands out as a tourist destination in the state, classified as ideal city for eco-tourism and adventure tourism.

== Images ==
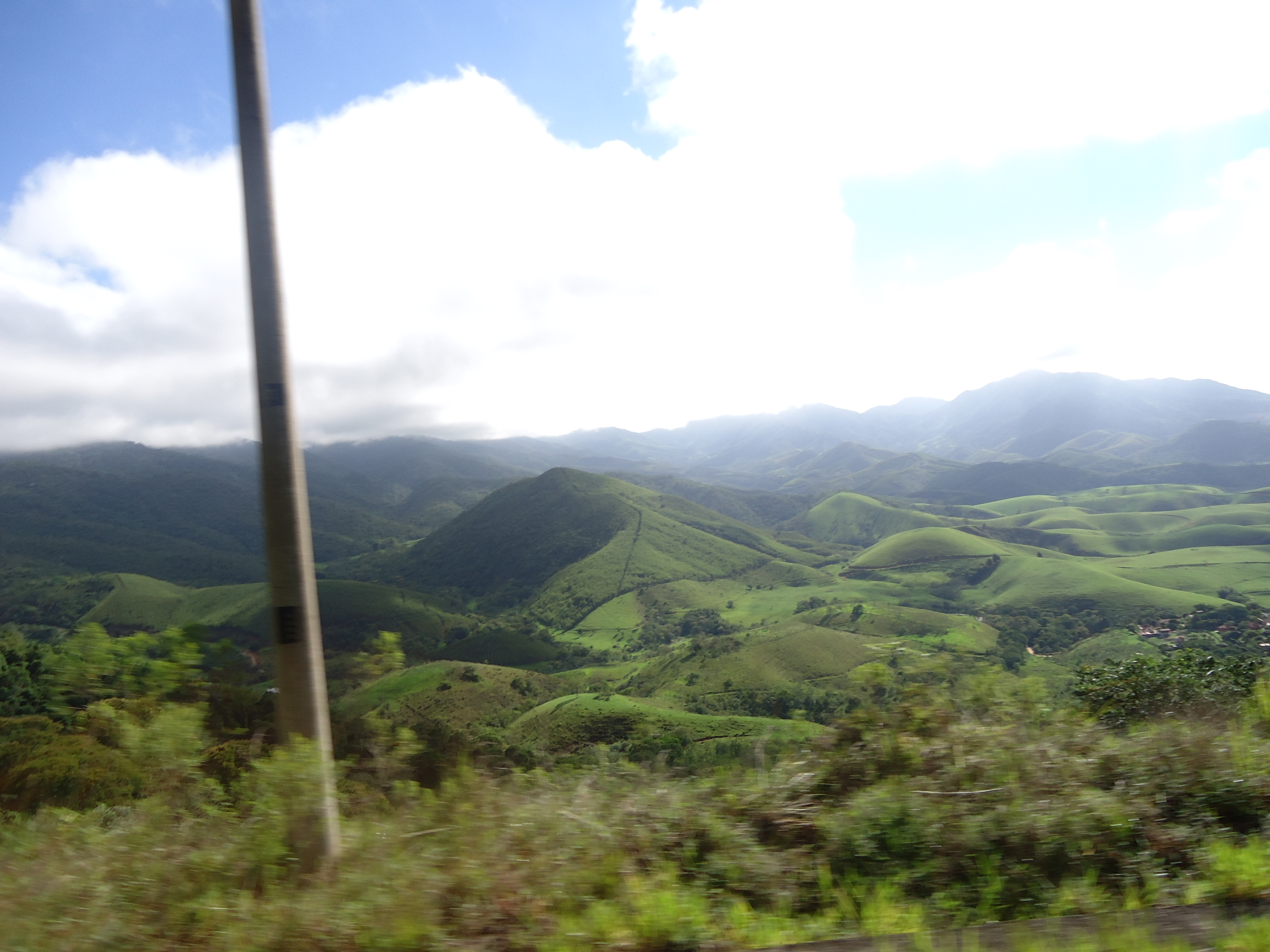

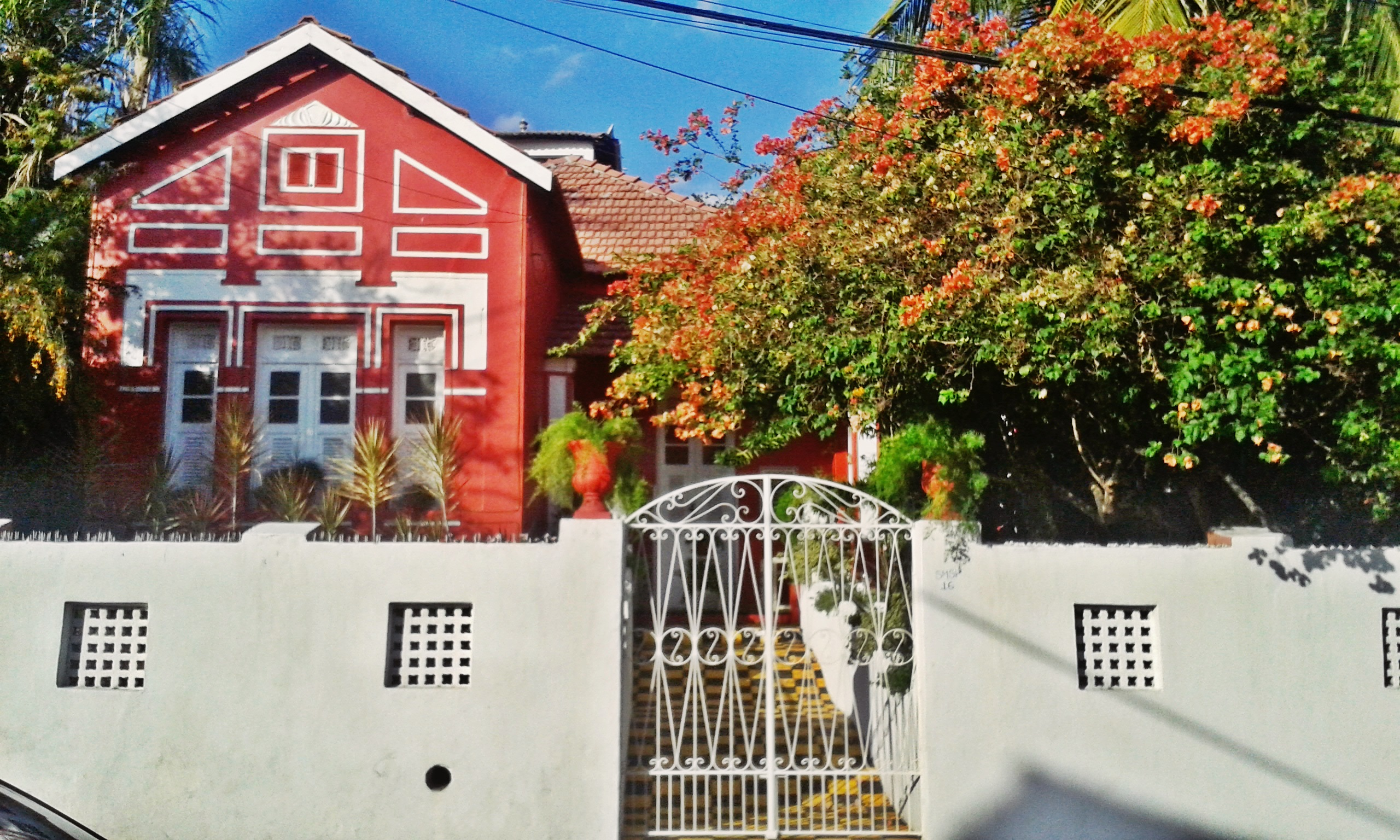

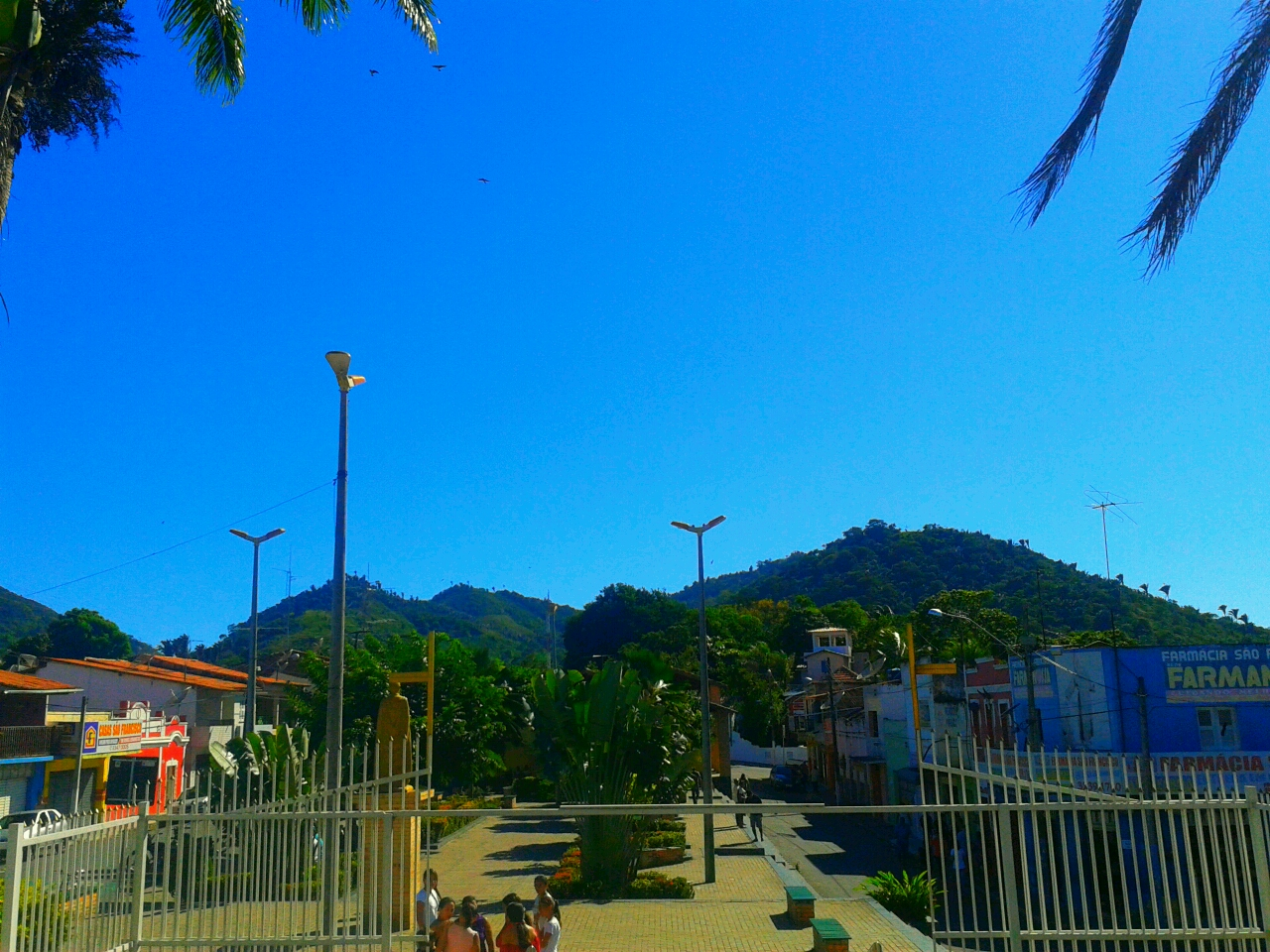

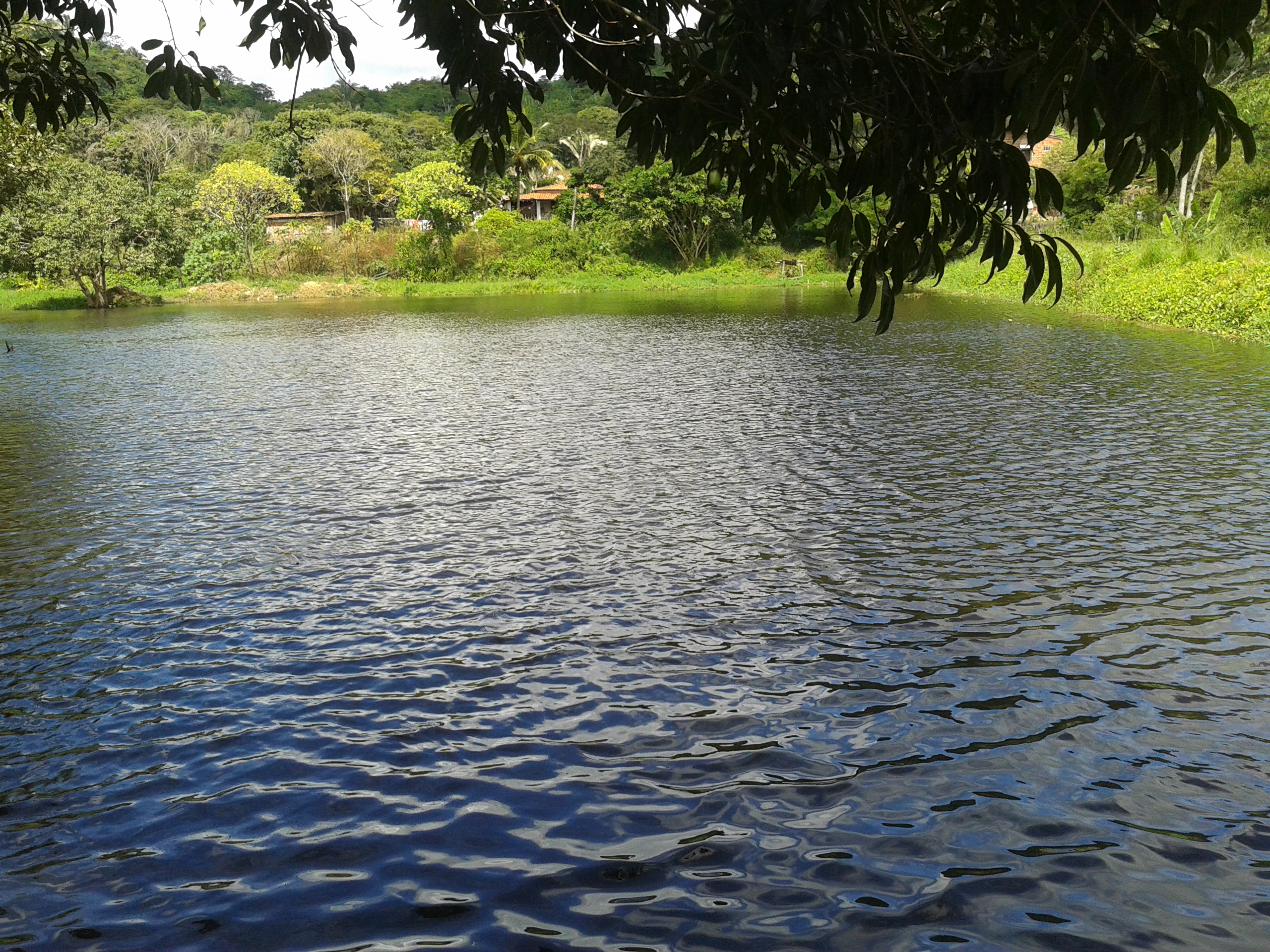

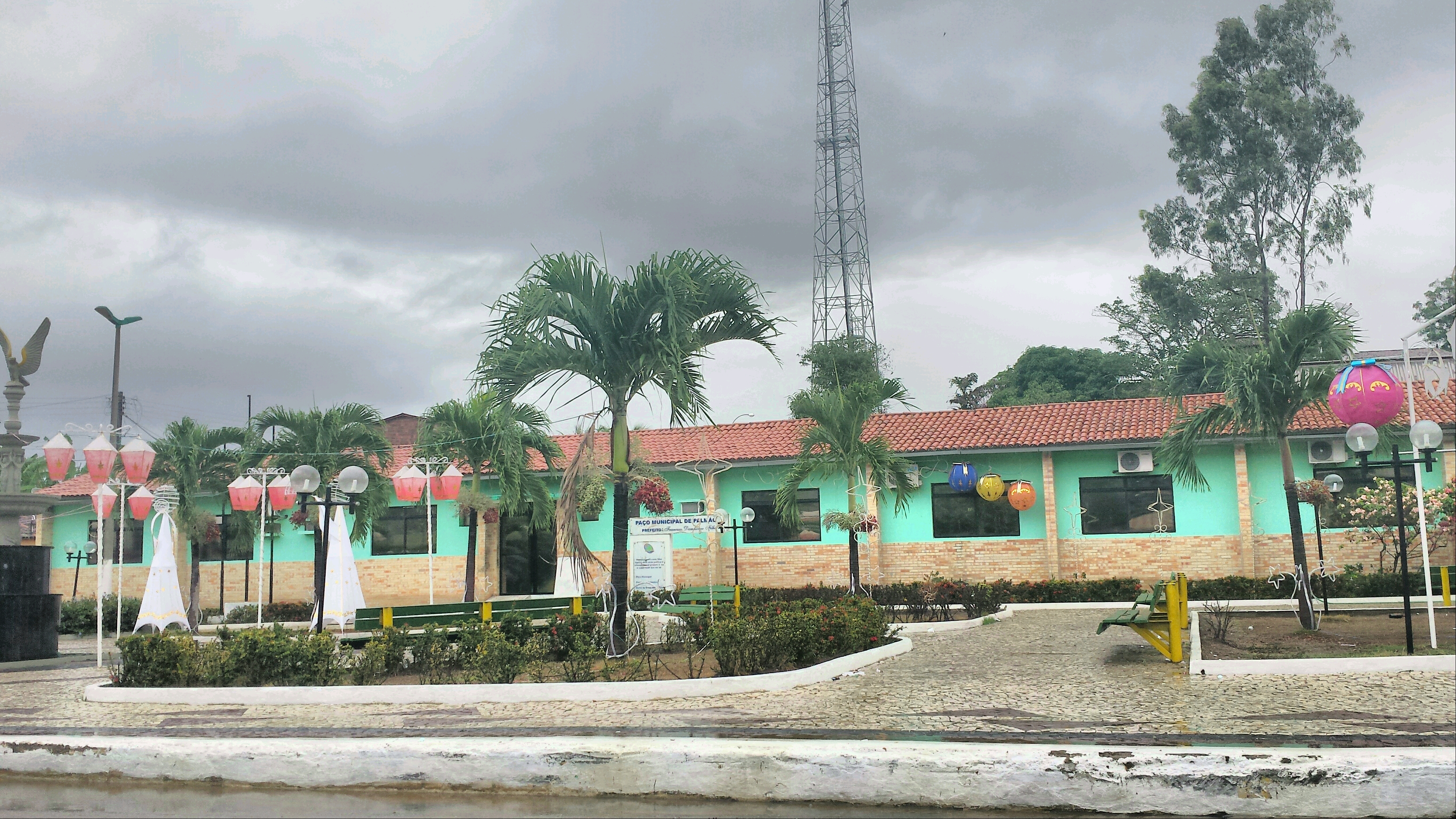

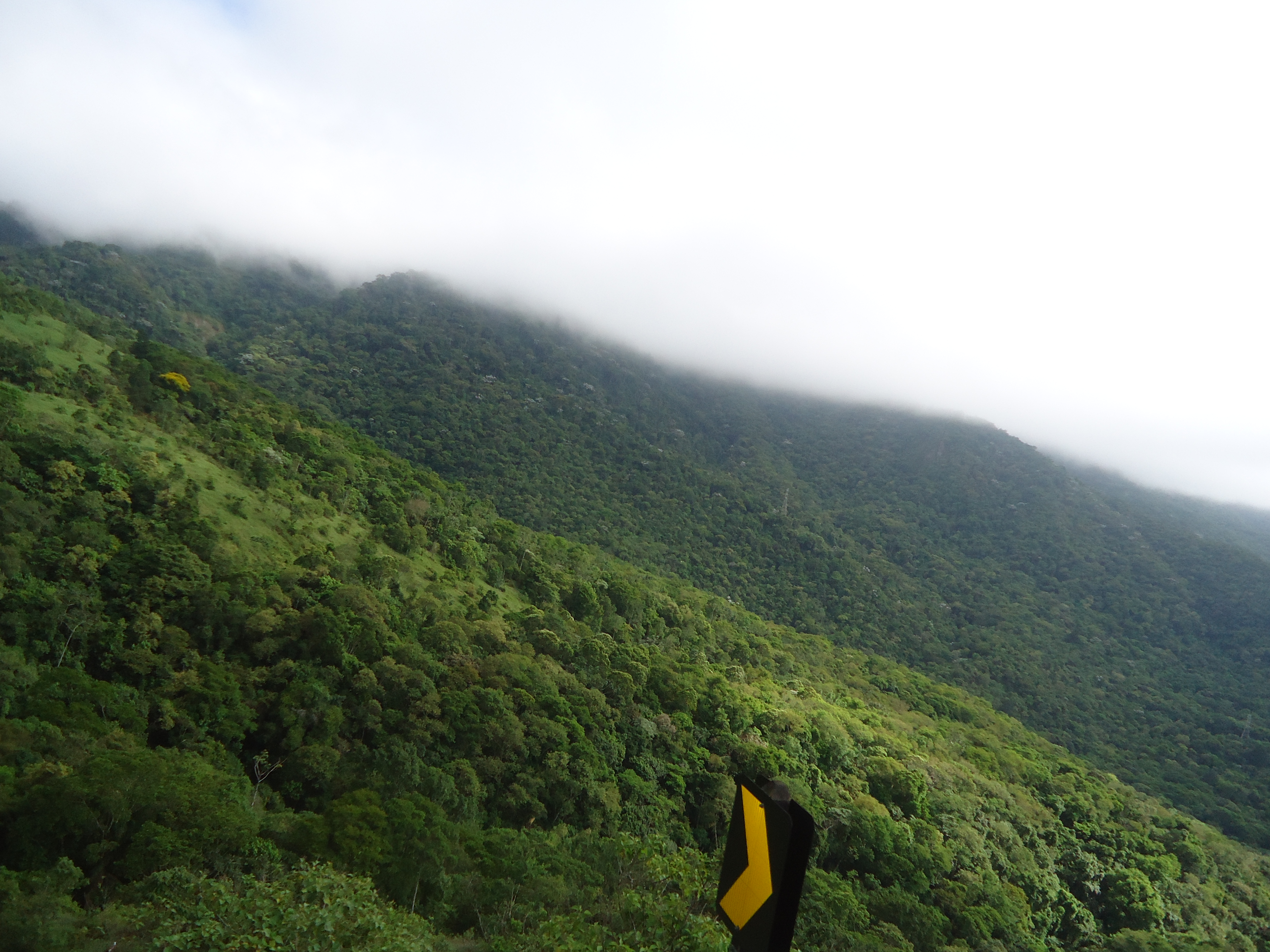

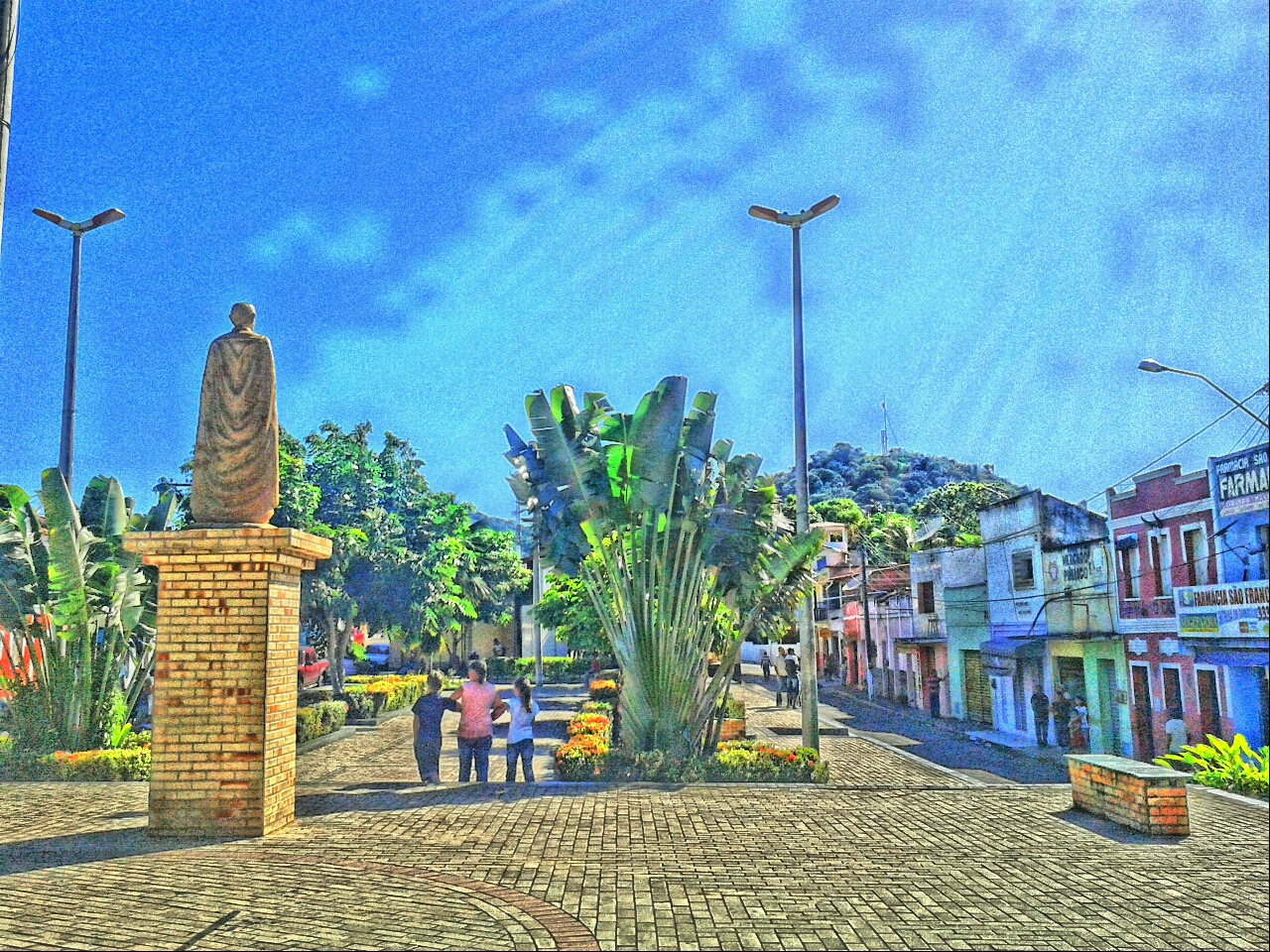

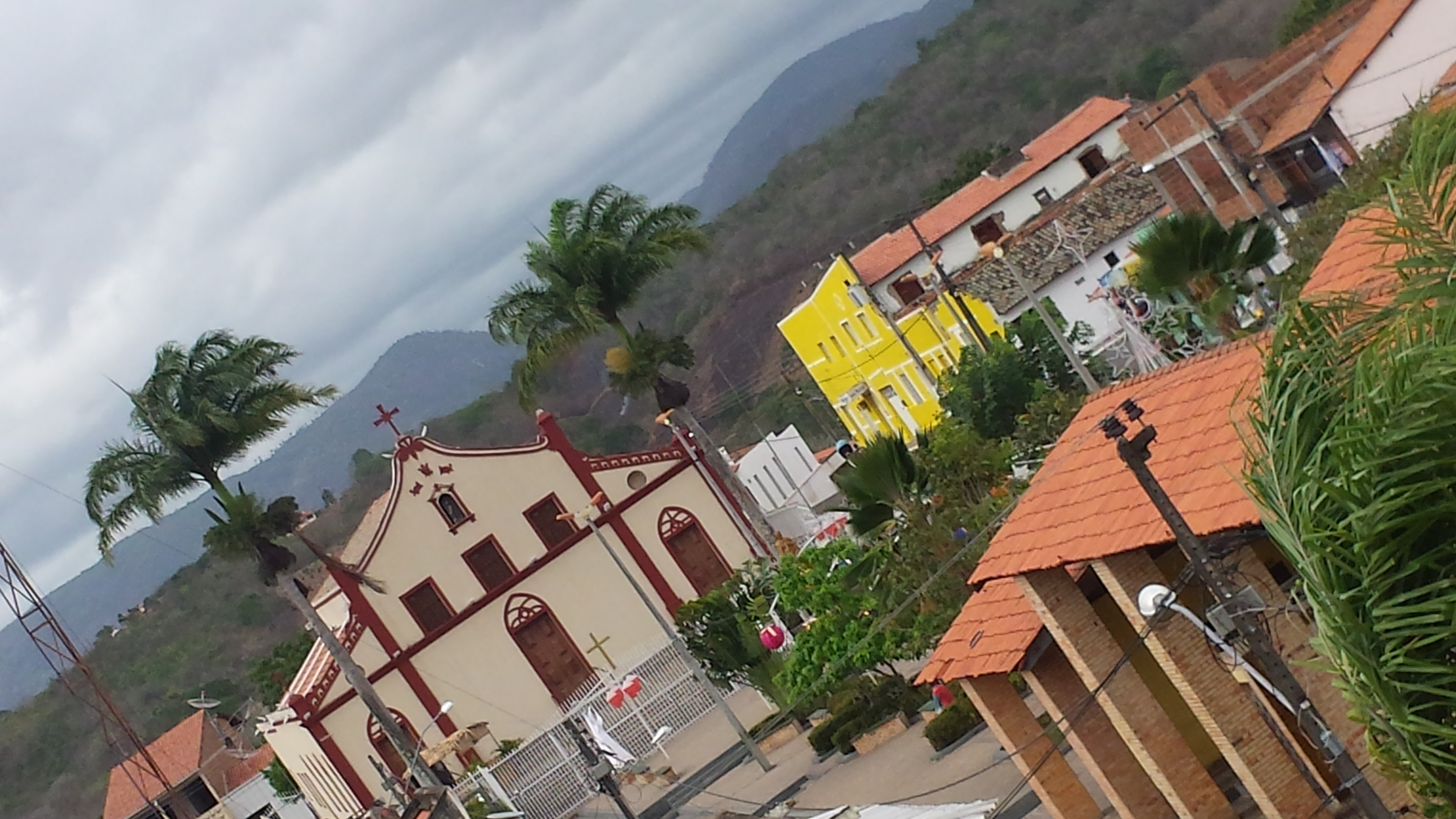

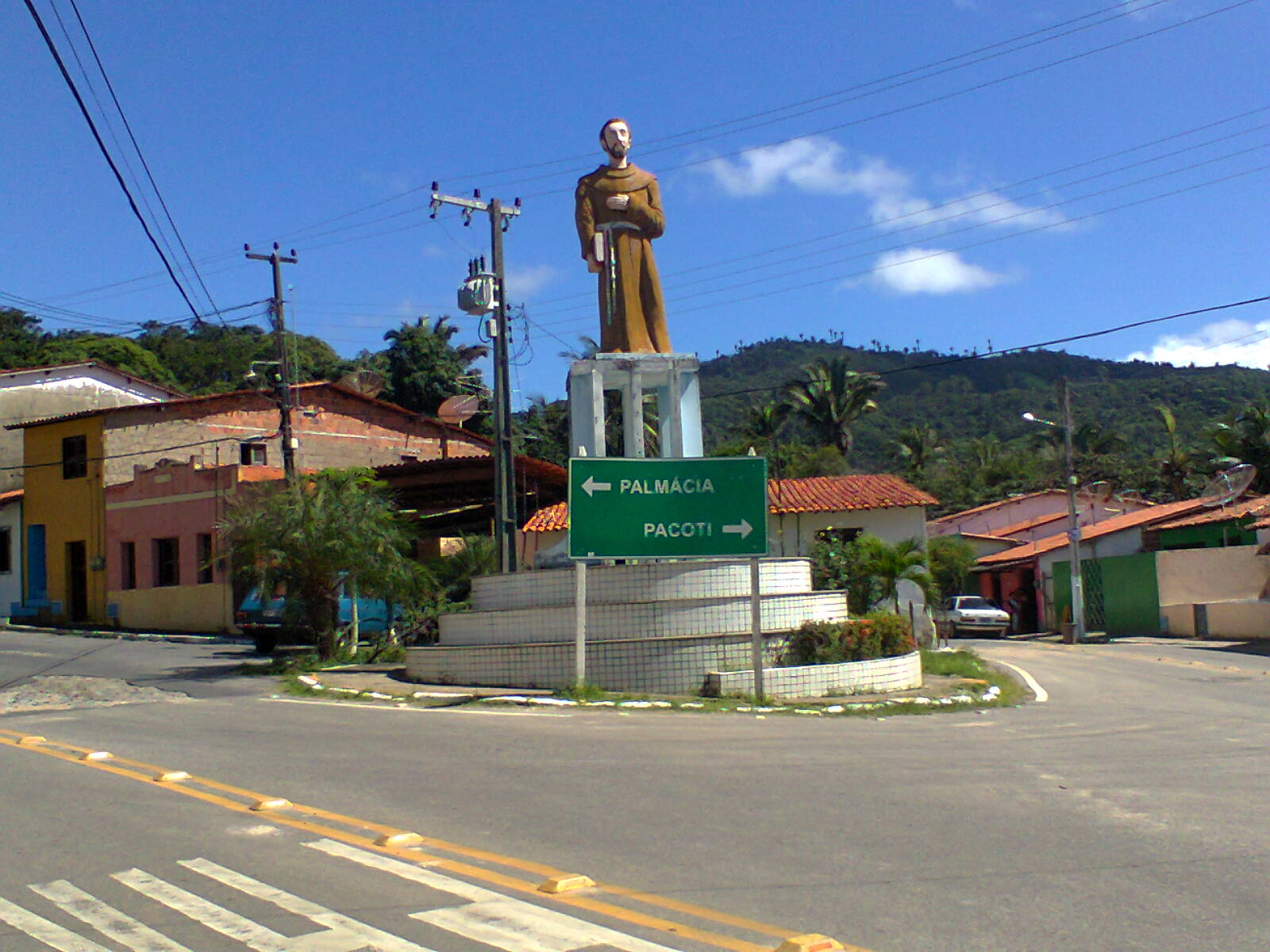

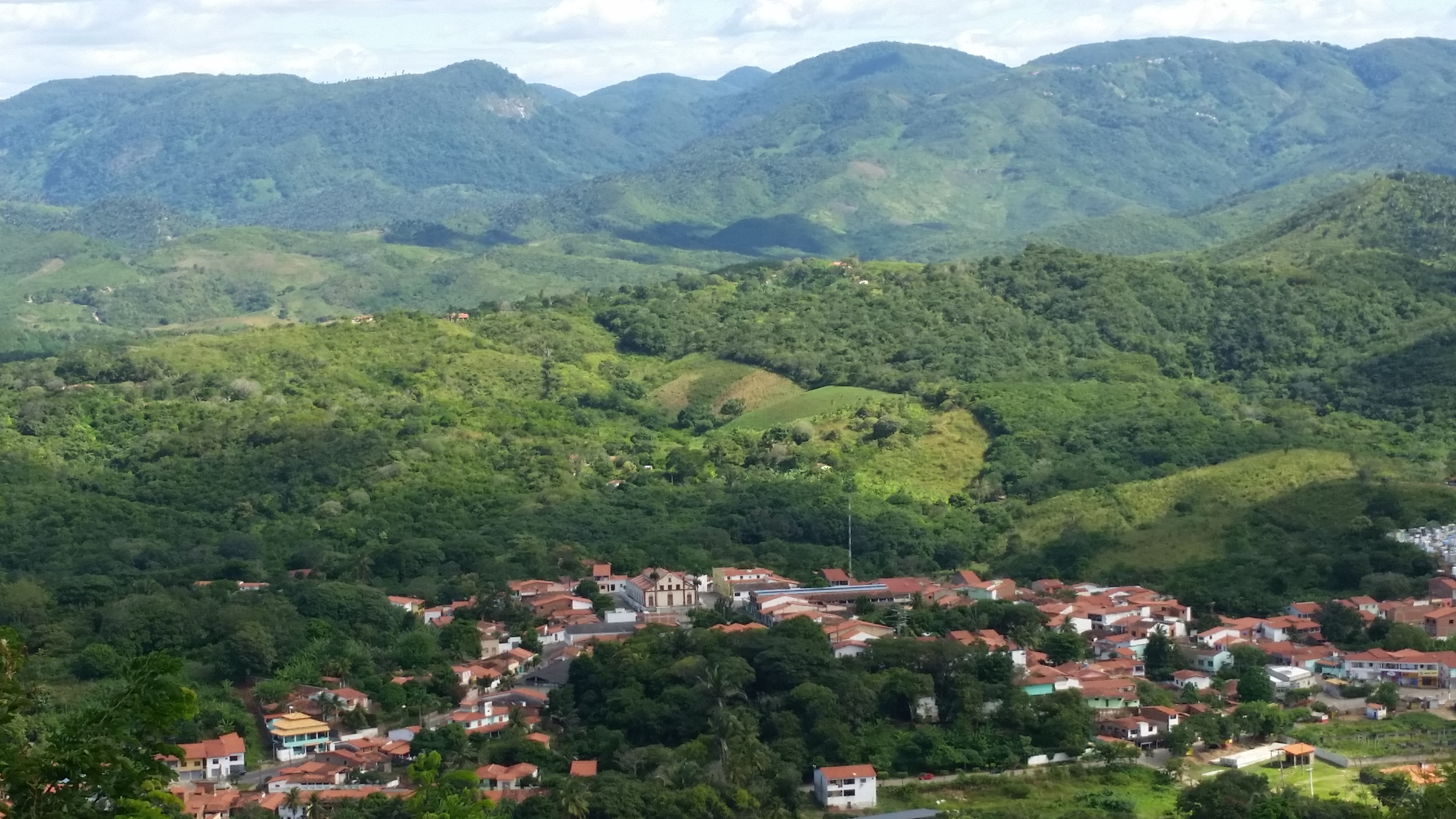

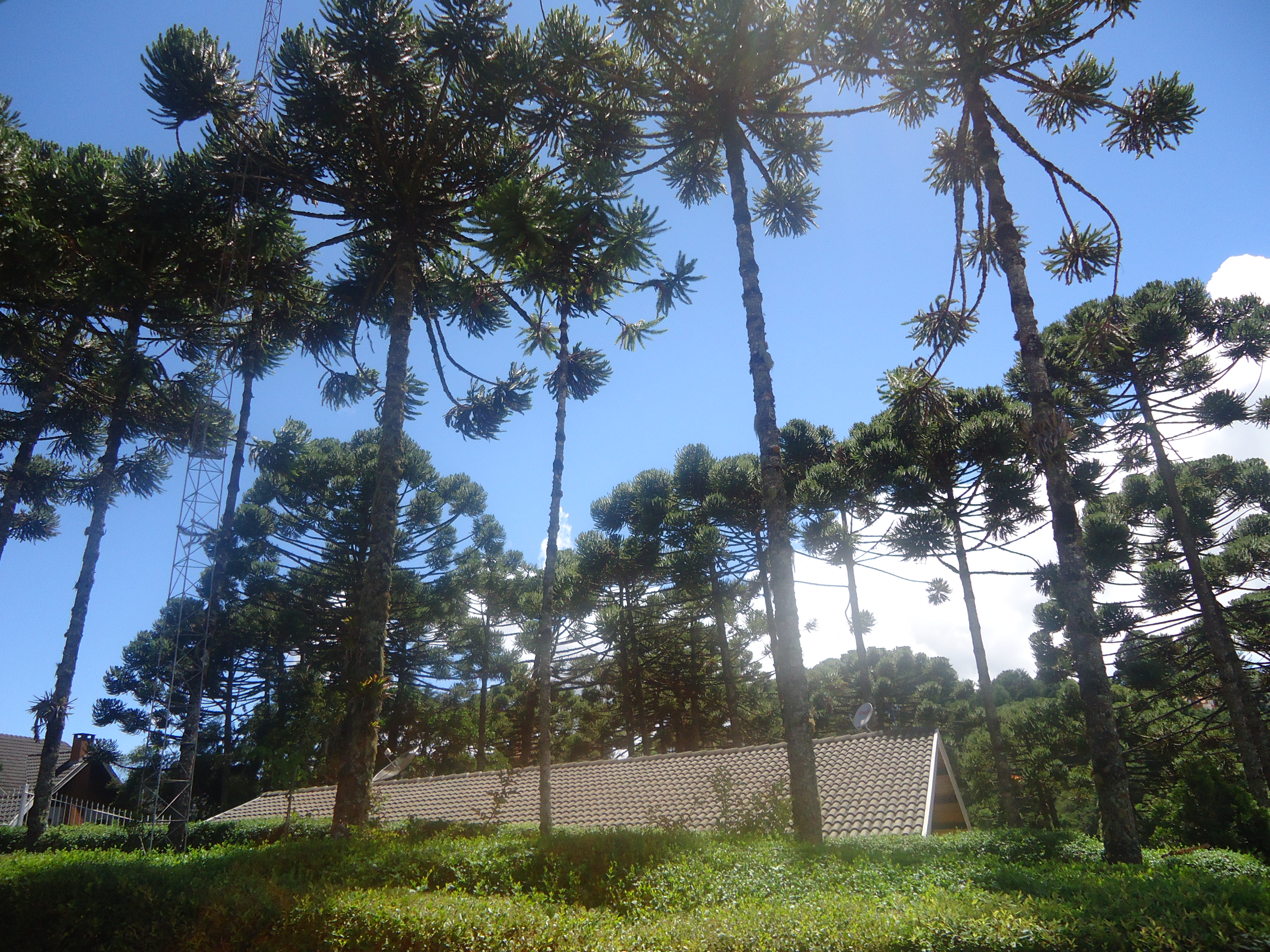

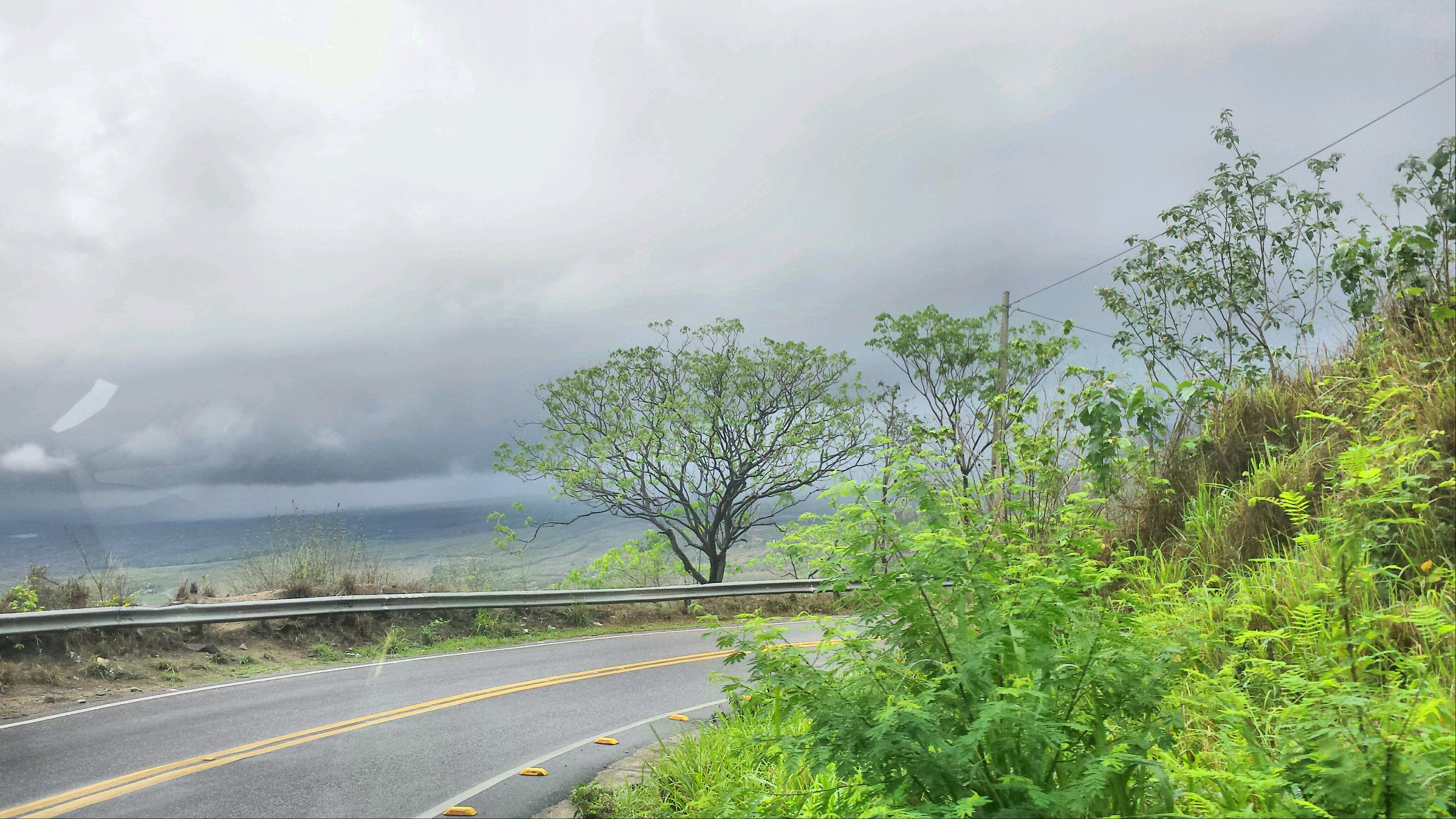

== See also ==
- List of municipalities in Ceará
