= Amargosa, Bahia =

Municipality of Bahia, Brazil

Coordinates: 13°01′48″S 39°36′18″W

Amargosa
- Municipality
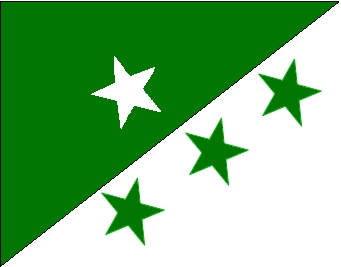
- Flag

- Country: Brazil
- Region: Nordeste
- State: Bahia
- Founded: April 24, 1877
- Elevation: 1,300 ft (400 m)

Population (2020)
  - Urban: 37,441
- Time zone: UTC -3

Amargosa is a municipality in the state of Bahia in the North-East region of Brazil.

== Banks ==
The city currently has three banking branches: Banco do Brasil, Caixa Econômica, and Bradesco. There are also two lottery shops and a post office.

== See also ==
- List of municipalities in Bahia
