= Aratuba =

Municipality in Ceará, Brazil

- Municipality
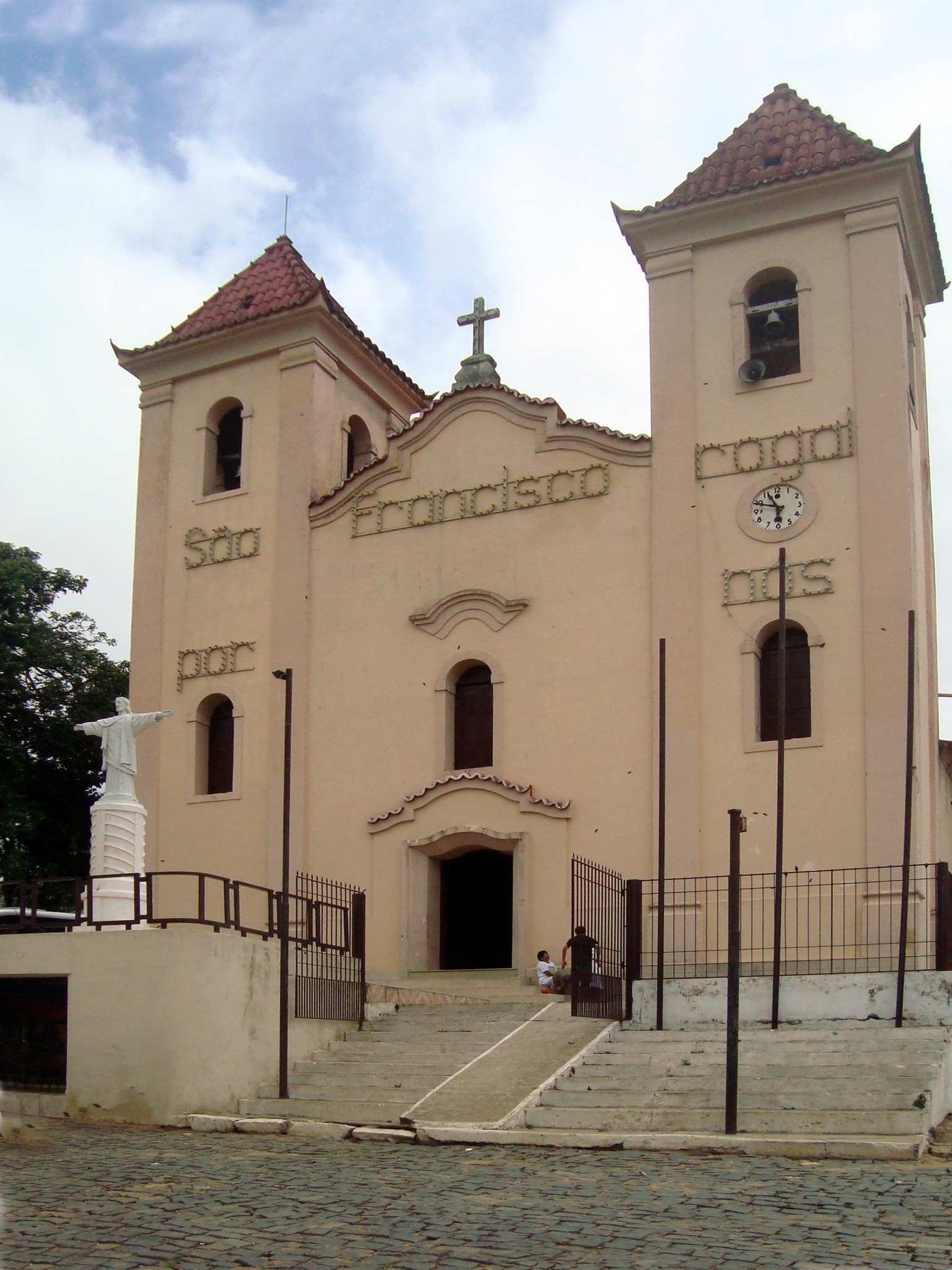
- Aratuba Parish Church

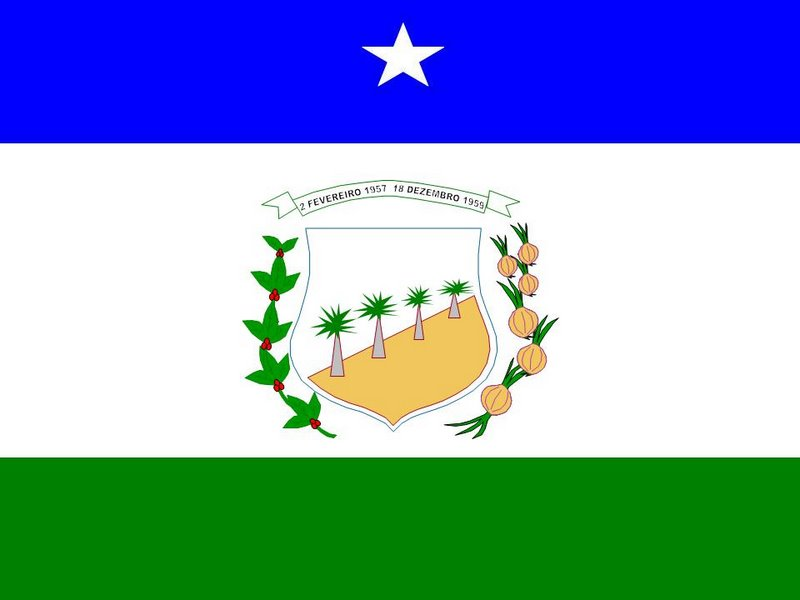
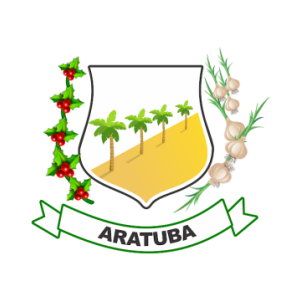
- Flag Coat of arms

- Location in Brazil
- Coordinates: 4.41778°S 39.045°W
- Country: Brazil
- Region: Nordeste
- State: Ceará
- Mesoregion: Noroeste Cearense

Population (2020)
  - Total: 11,802
- Time zone: UTC−3 (BRT)

Aratuba is a municipality in the state of Ceará in the Northeast region of Brazil.

== See also ==
- List of municipalities in Ceará
