= Canindé, Ceará =

Municipality in Ceará, Brazil

Canindé
- Municipality
- The Municipality of Canindé
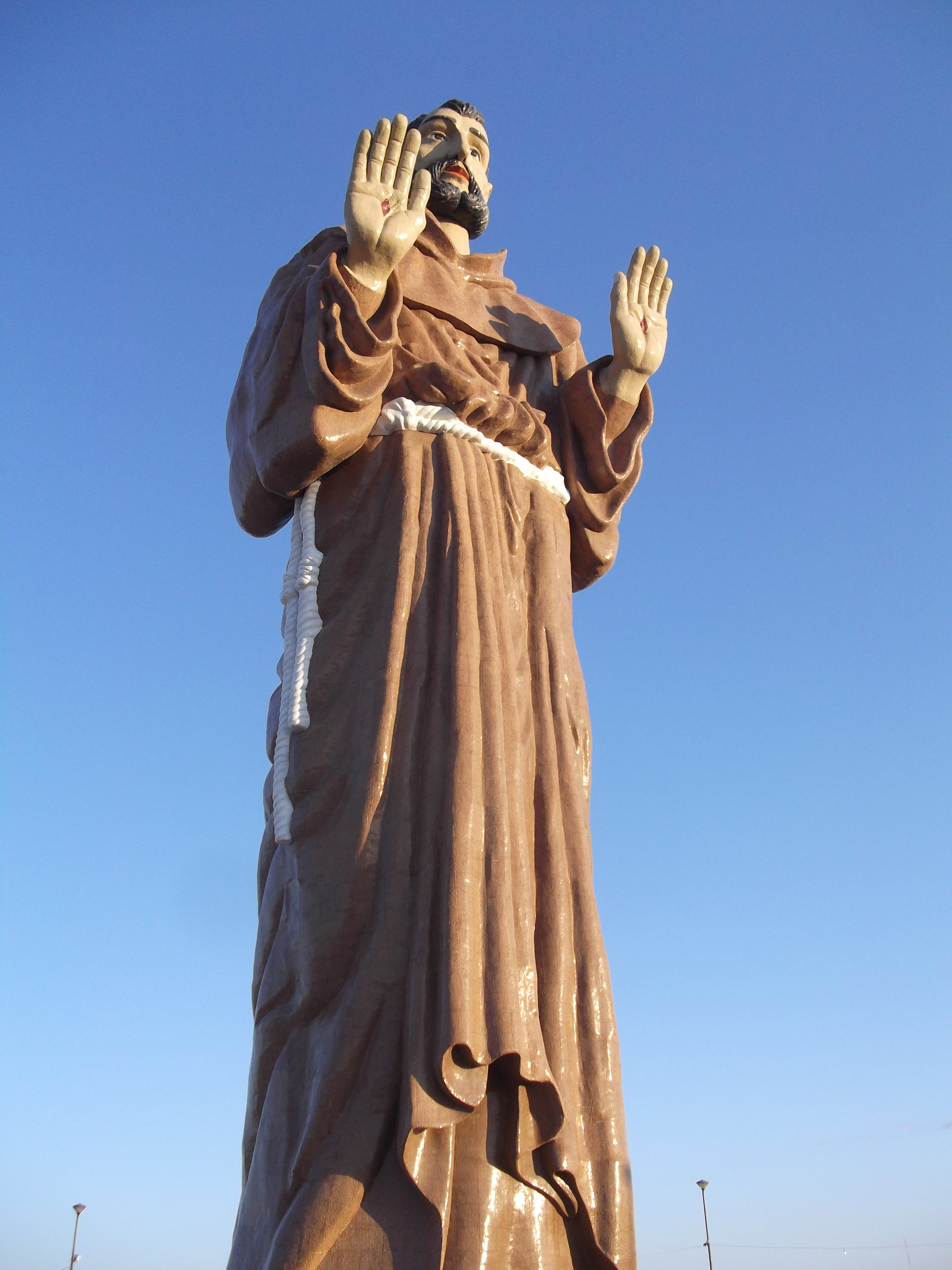
- Statue of Saint Francis

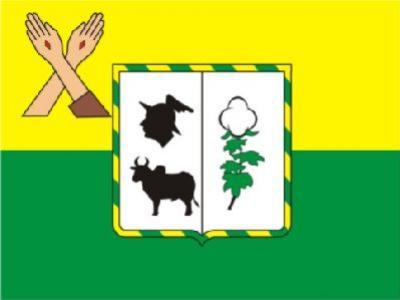
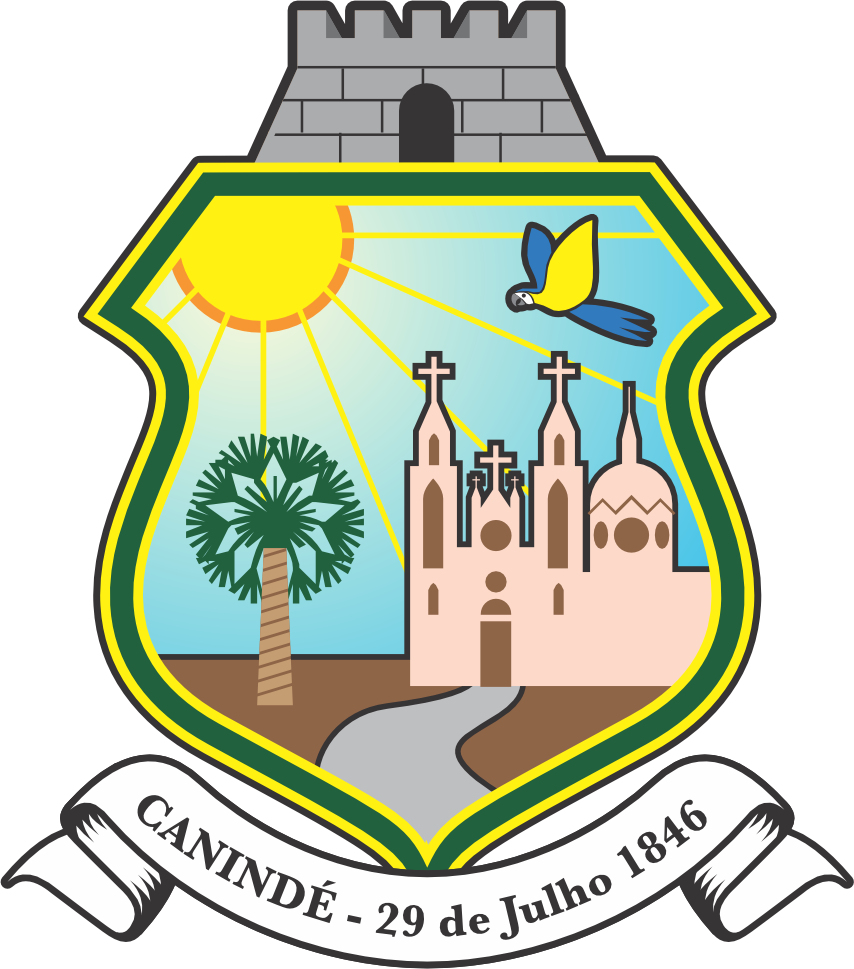
- Flag Coat of arms
- Nickname: Meca Nordestina
- Coordinates: 4.358569°S 39.313954°W
- Country: Brazil
- Region: Northeast
- State: Ceará

Government
  - Mayor: Rozário Ximenes (REPUBLICANOS, 2021 - 2024)

Area
  - Total: 3,218.423 km^{2} (1,242.640 sq mi)

Population (2020)
  - Total: 77,244
  - Rank: 405th
  - Density: 23.14/km^{2} (59.9/sq mi)
- Time zone: UTC−3 (BRT)
- Postal Code: 60000-000
- Area code: +55 85
- Website: Canindé, Ceará

Canindé is a Brazilian municipality located in the state of Ceará. It is the 11th most populous city in the state. It is known for being religious, especially during the annual Saint Francis Party that lasts an entire week. The municipality receives millions of tourists every year, and the most visited places are the Saint Francis statue and the Saint Francis Church.

== History ==
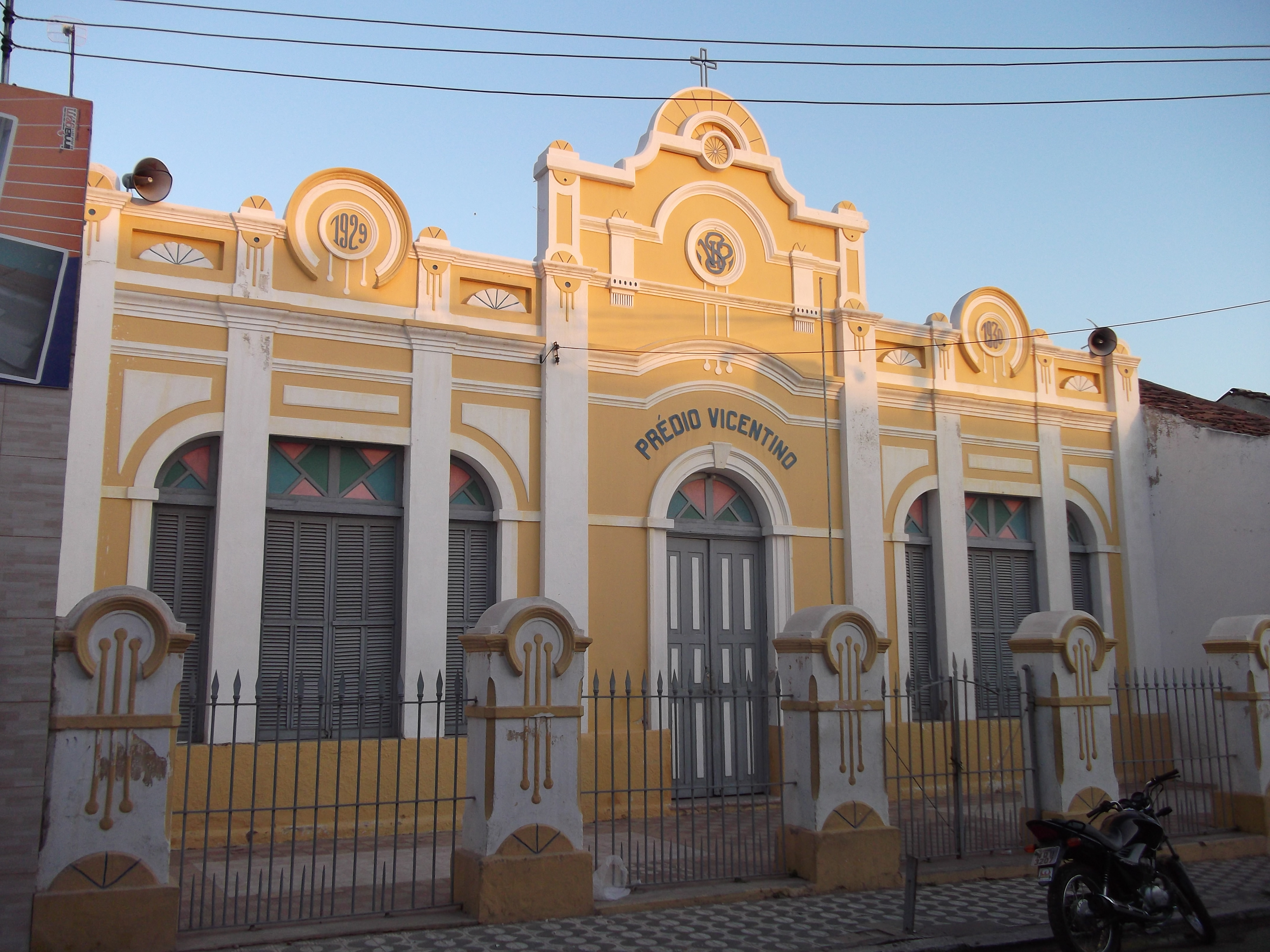
Vincentino Building.

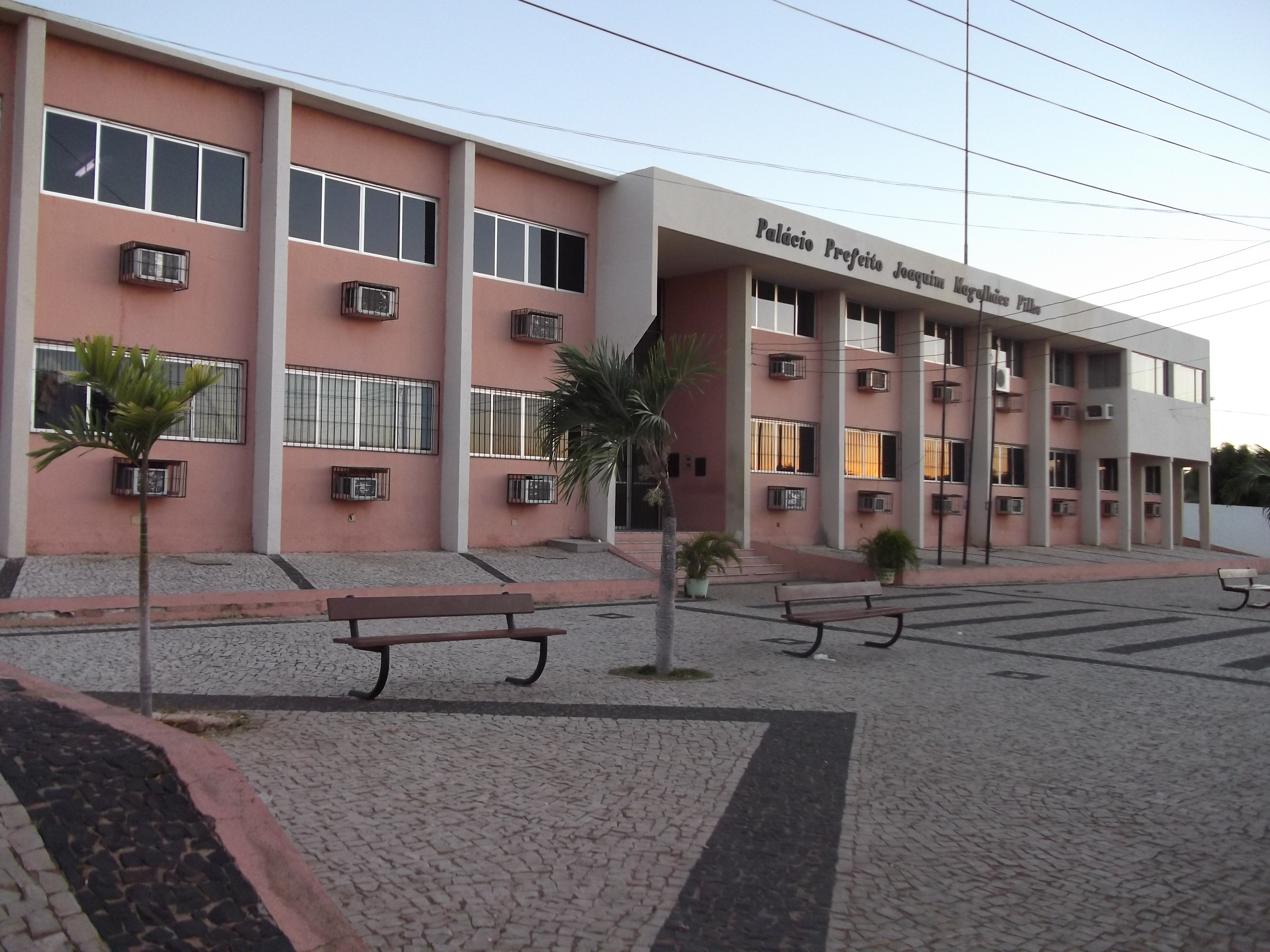
Canindé City Hall

The Curu River and the Choró River were inhabited by Native Brazilians, the Tapuia. After the 17th century, Portuguese colonizers started habituating the land.

In 1775, Xavier de Medeiros, right at the border of the Canindé River, started building a church for Saint Francis. Nowadays, the church is at the same place; however, it was totally reformulated by the Italian architect Antonio Mazzoti and the painter George Kau. In 1818, Canindé became a village, and on July 29, 1846, the Municipality of Canindé was declared.

== Geography ==
=== climate ===
Canindé has a tropical semiarid climate with temperatures that goes from 25 °C to 32 °C

=== Soil ===
The soil in Canindé is composed of non-calcium type (55.14%), litholic (12.52%,), and others (4.04%).

=== Fauna ===
Canindé has a semiarid climate and so most of its fauna is composed of animals that are well adapted to it like Canindé birds, armadillos, lizards and sparrow-hawks.

== Politics ==
On June 21, 1847 it was installed the city building in Canindé Downtown.

== Education ==
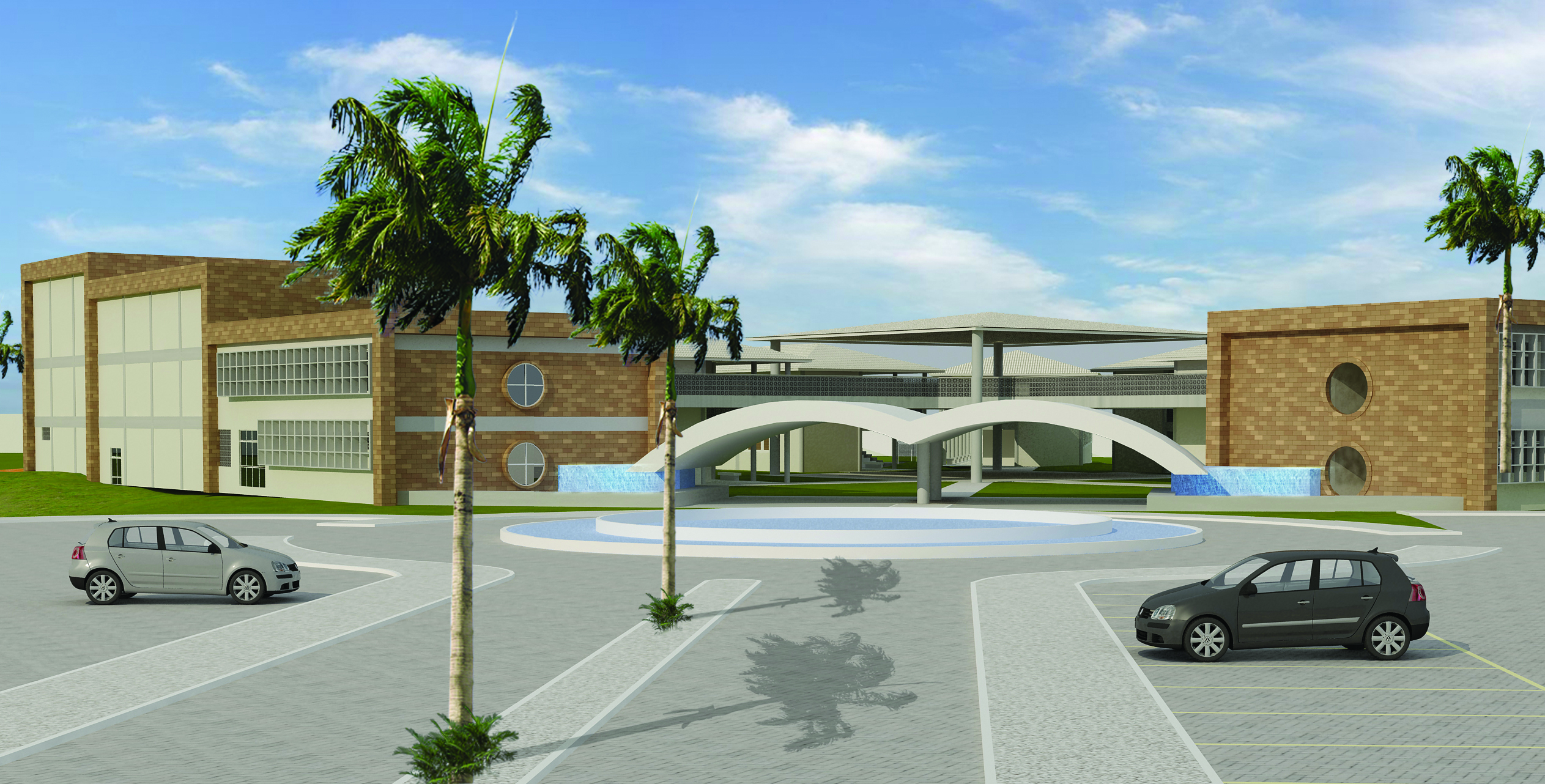
IFCE Canindé.

Canindé has three public high schools: the Paulo Sarasate School, Frei Policarpo School and the School of Professional Education Capelão Frei Orlando and one private high school, theCNEC-Canindé. The city also host a headquarters of the Federal Institute of Education (IFCE).

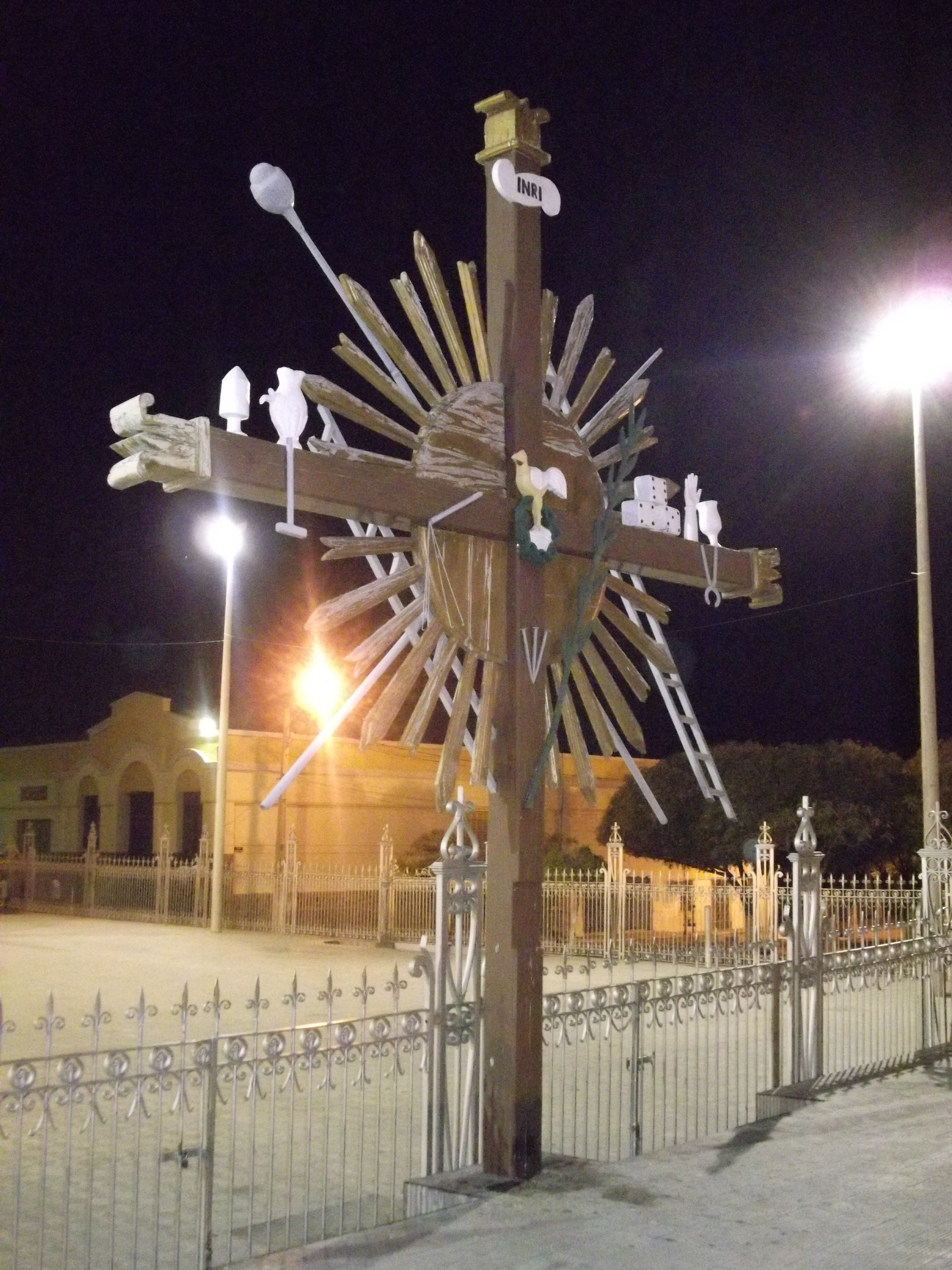
Saint Francis Church.

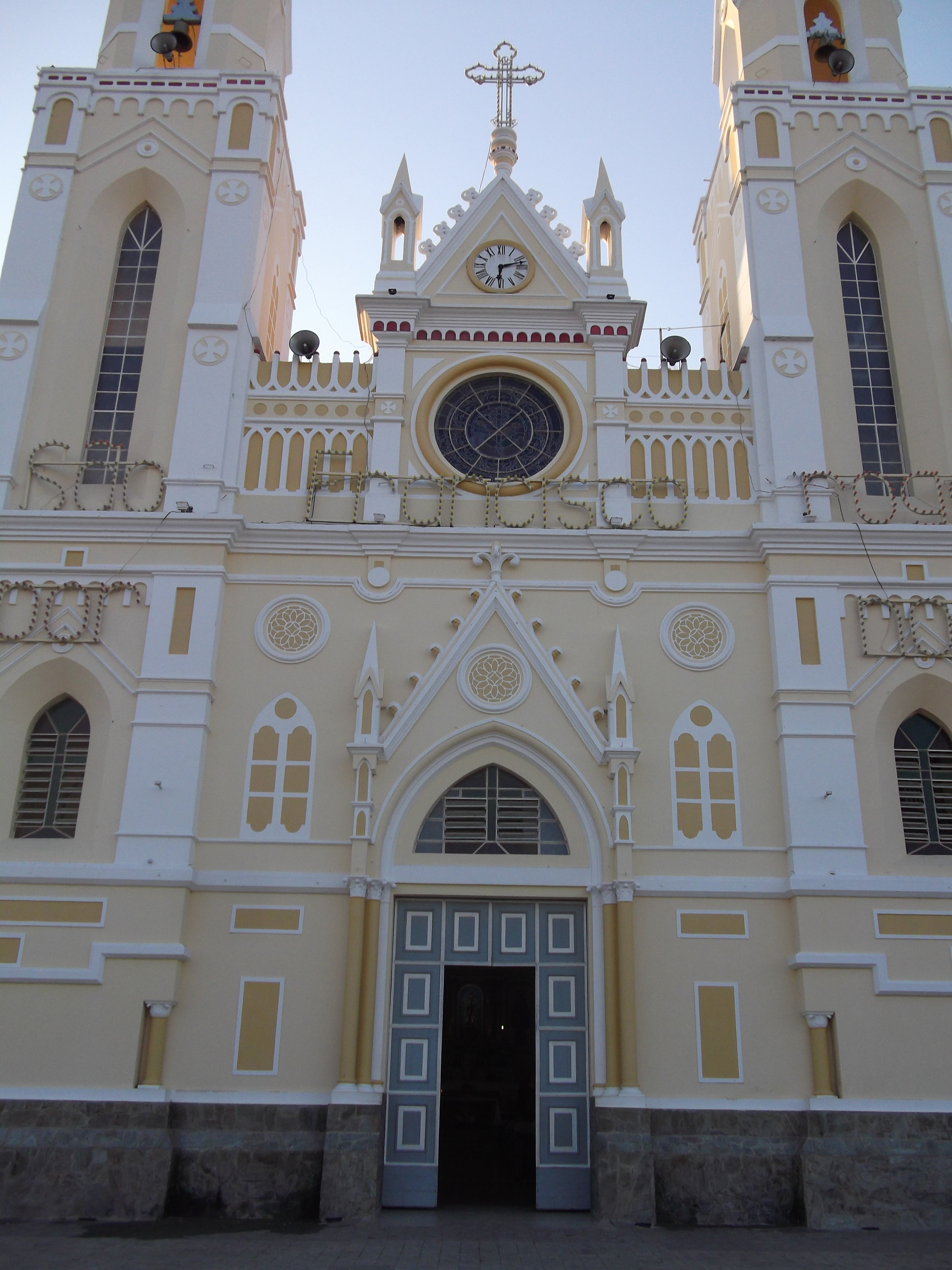
Saint Francis Church.
