= Fortaleza =

Capital city of Ceará, Brazil

- Municipality
- Municipality of Fortaleza; Município de Fortaleza
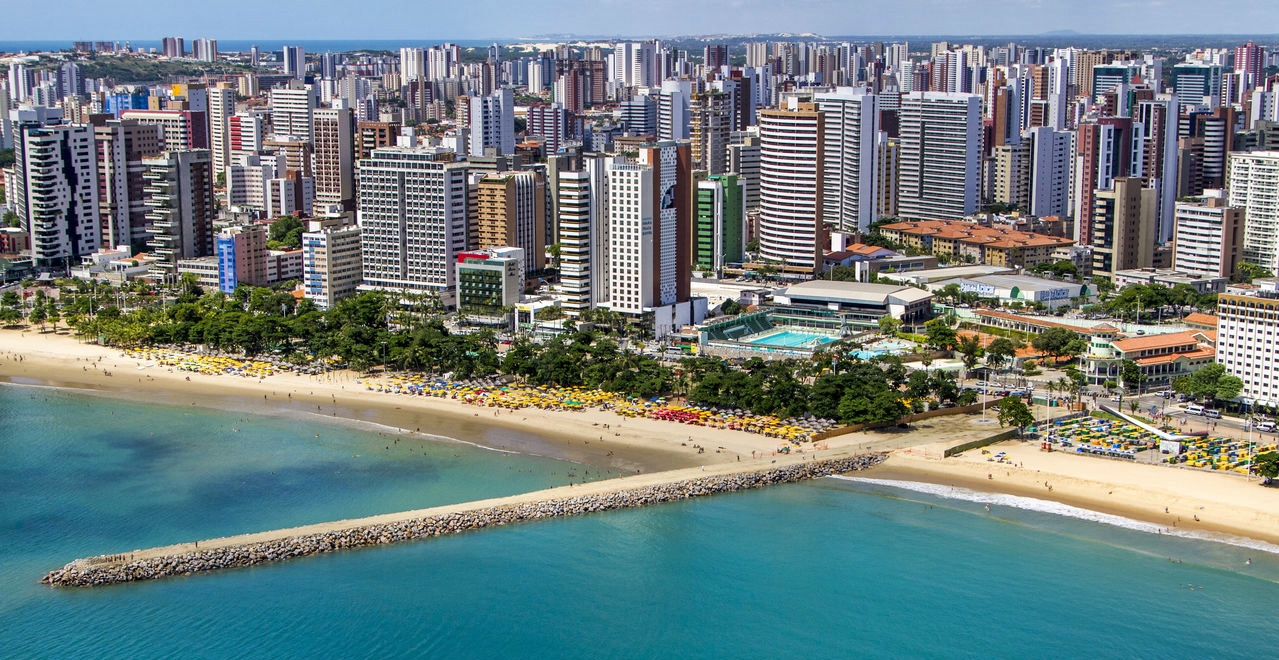
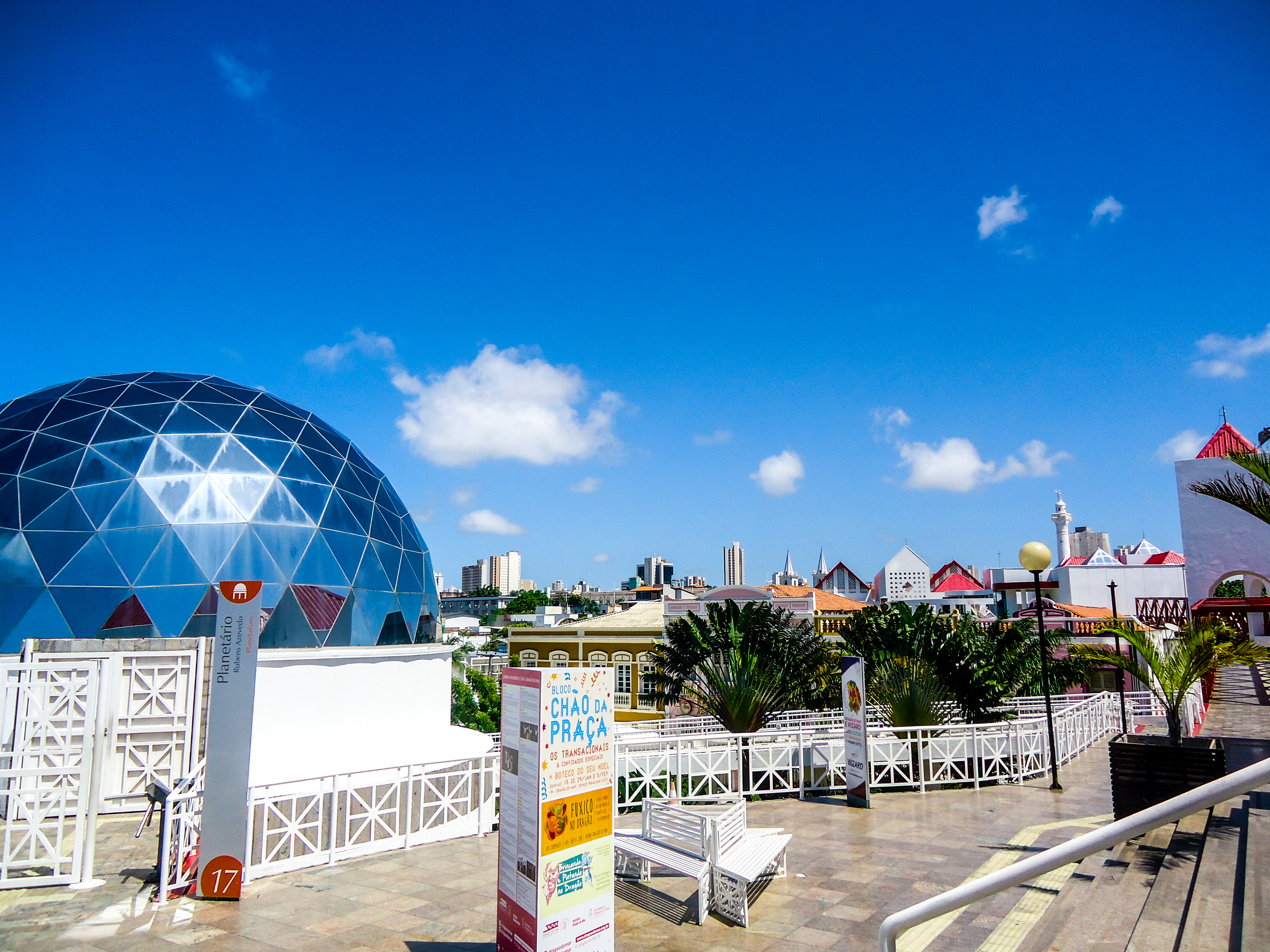
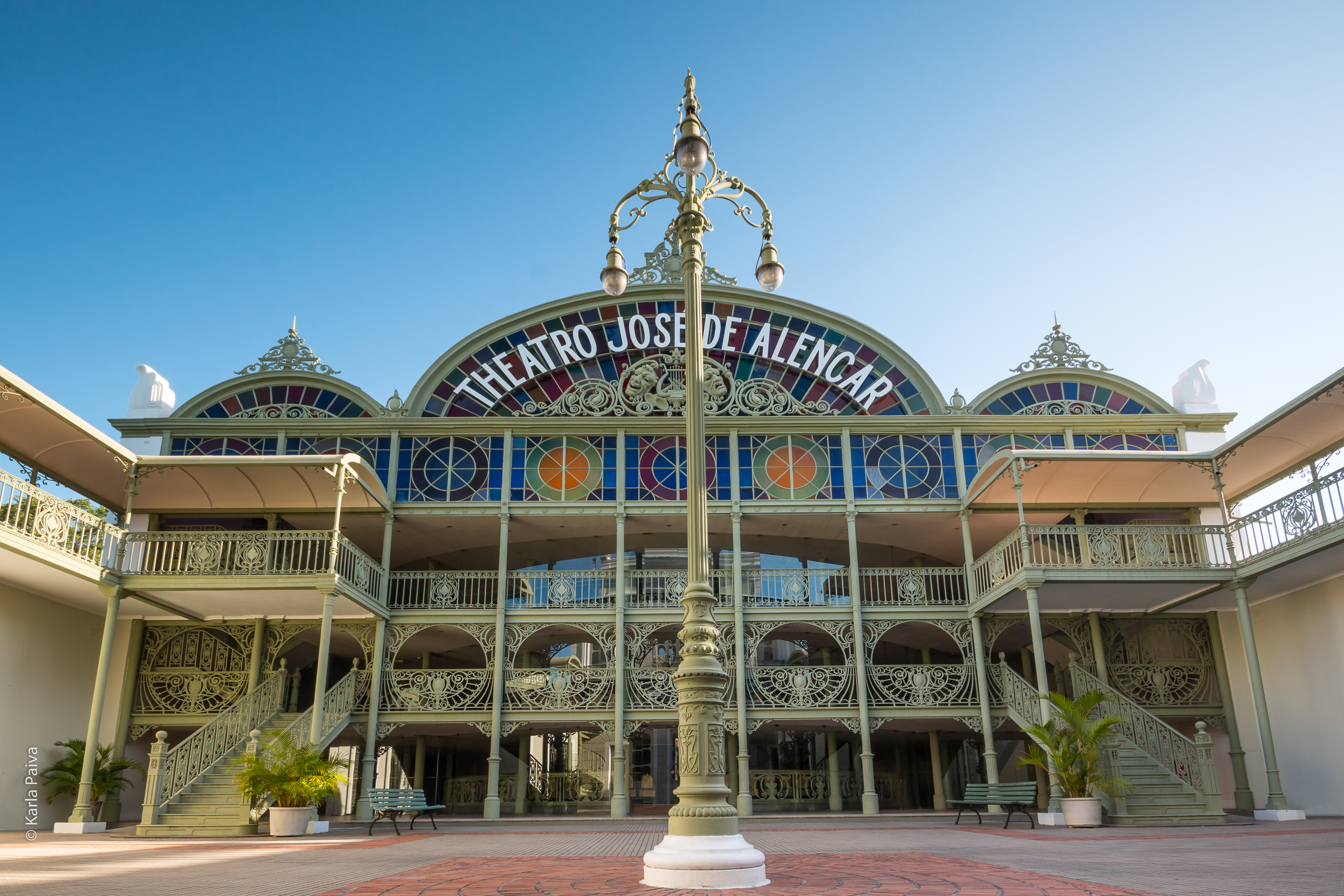
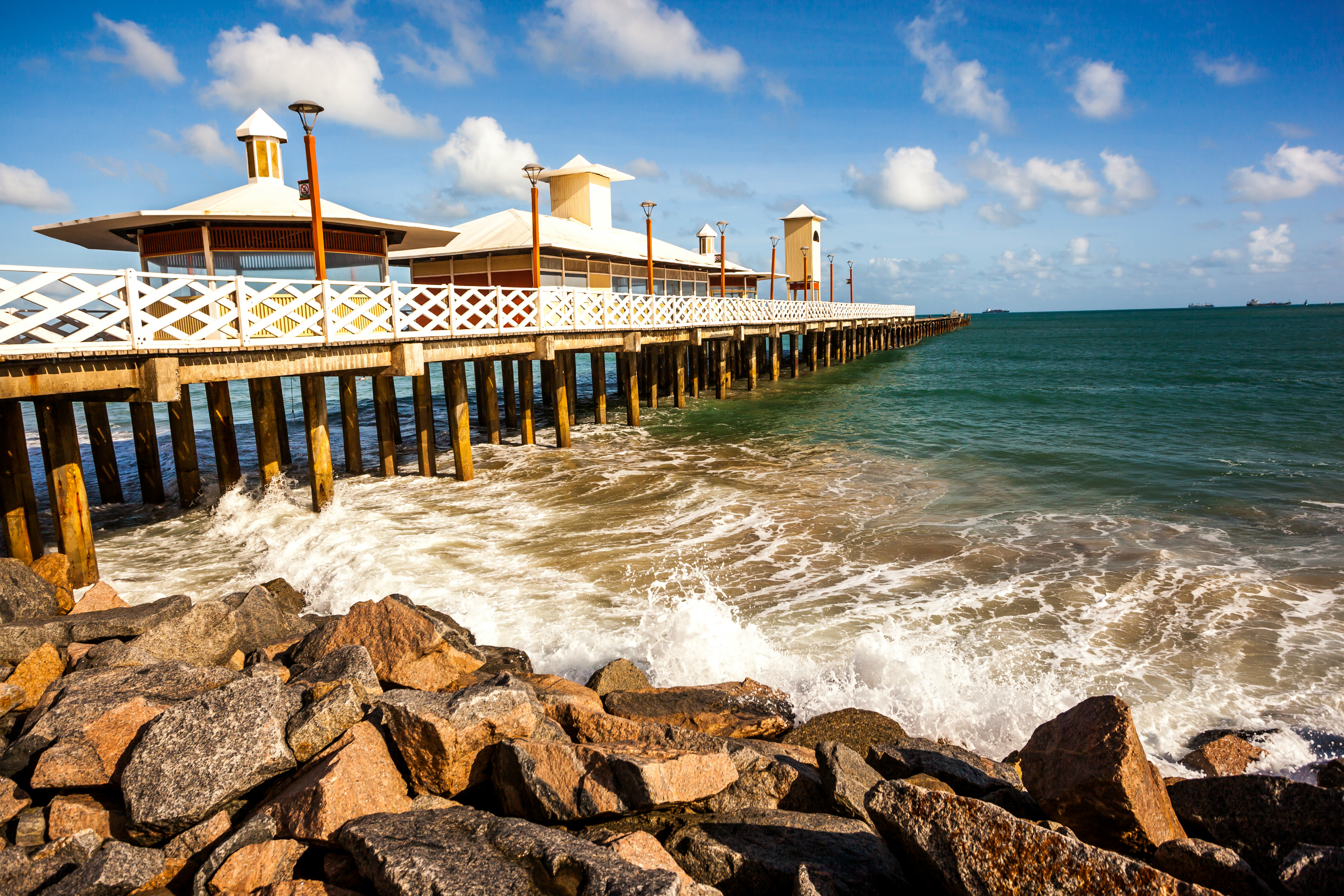
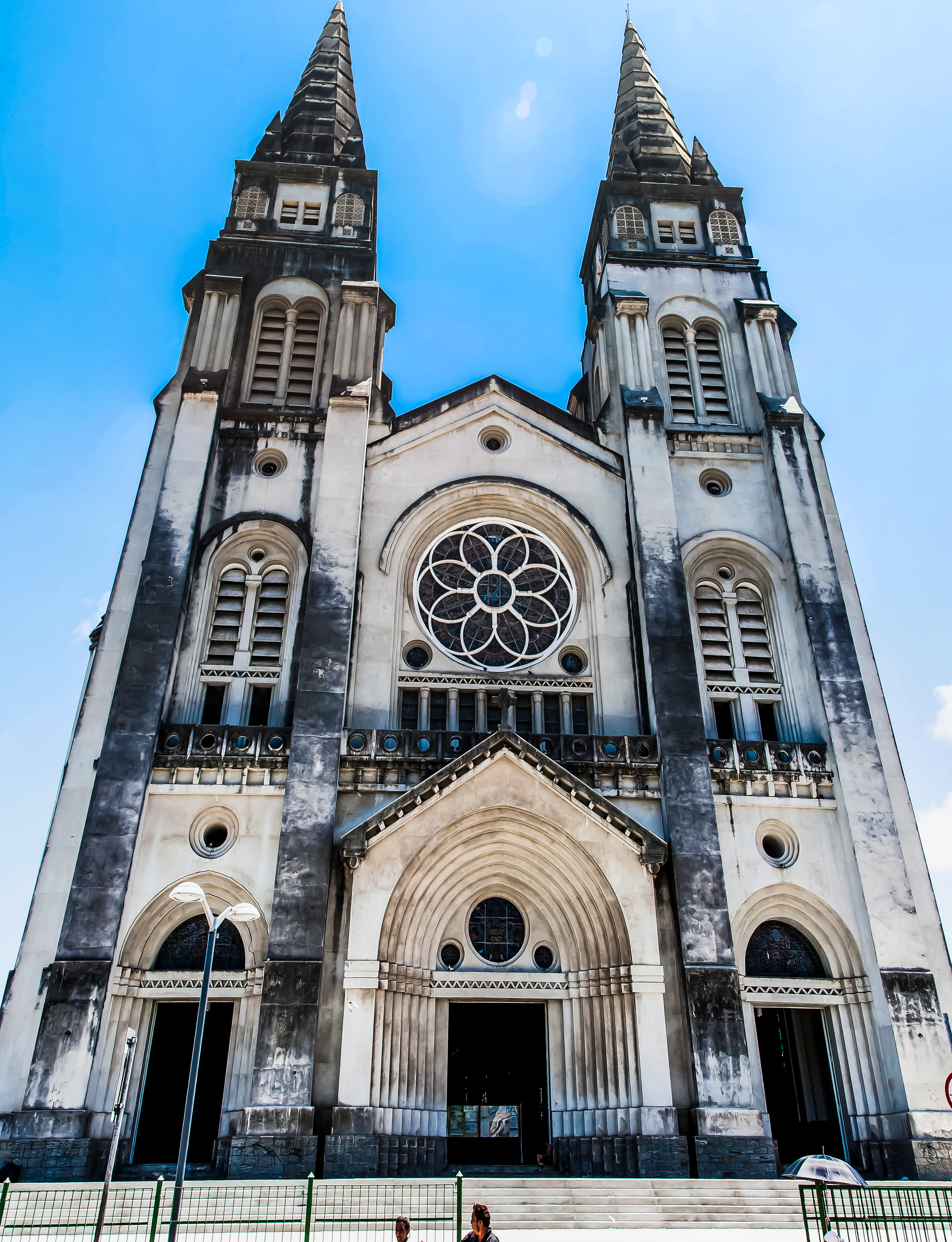
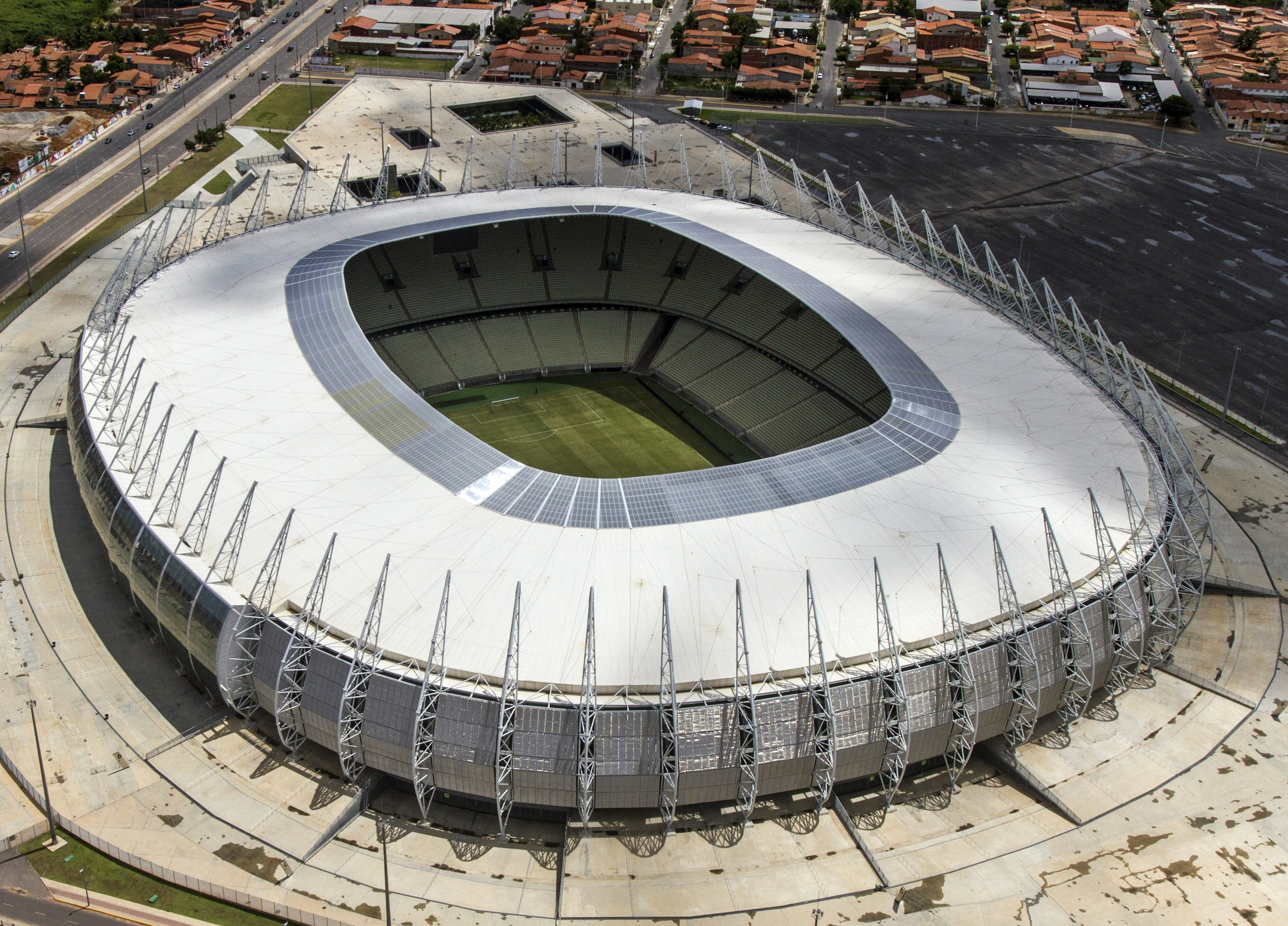
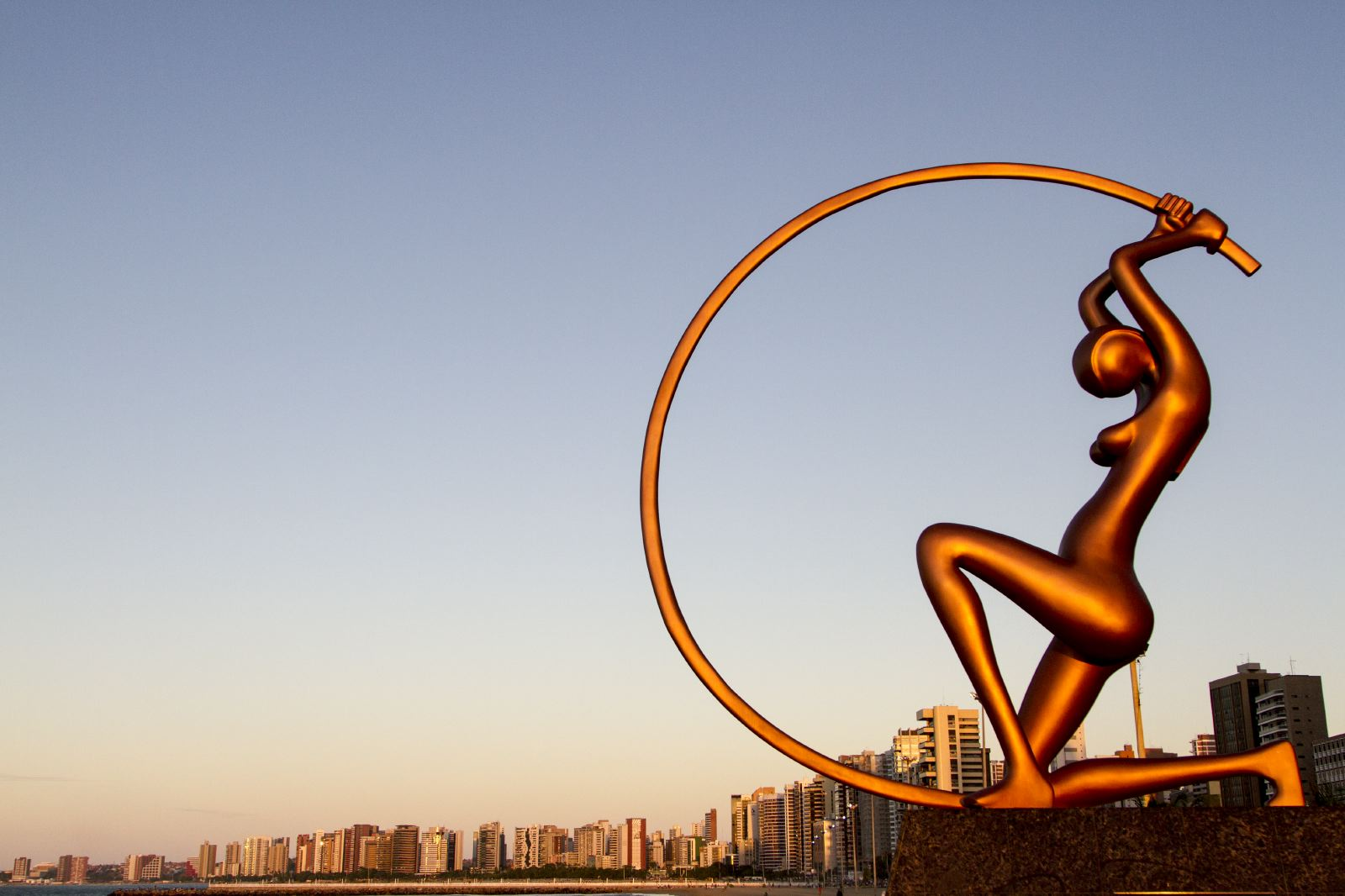
- Skyline of Fortaleza with the Meireles Beach Dragão do Mar Center of Art and Culture Theatre José de Alencar English Bridge St. Joseph's Cathedral Castelão Stadium Statue of Iracema

- Flag Coat of arms
- Nicknames: Fortal; Miami Brasileira (Brazilian Miami); Terra da Luz (Land of Light)
- Motto: "Fortitudine" (Latin)
- Interactive map of Fortaleza
- Location in Brazil Fortaleza (South America)
- Coordinates: 03°43′39″S 38°31′39″W
- Country: Brazil
- Region: Northeast
- State: Ceará
- Founded: 13 April 1726
- Named for: "Fort of Our Lady of the Assumption" (Virgin Mary)

Government
  - Type: Mayor-council
  - Mayor: Evandro Leitão (PT)
  - Deputy mayor: Gabriella Aguiar (PSD)

Area
  - Municipality: 312.353 km^{2} (120.600 sq mi)
  - Metro: 7,440.053 km^{2} (2,872.621 sq mi)
- Elevation: 16 m (52 ft)

Population (2025)
  - Municipality: 2,578,483
  - Rank: 4th
  - Density: 8,654.92/km^{2} (22,416.1/sq mi)
  - Metro: 3,903,945
  - Metro density: 560.21/km^{2} (1,450.9/sq mi)
- Demonym: Portuguese: Fortalezense

GDP (PPP, constant 2015 values)
  - Year: 2023
  - Total (Metro): $39.6 billion
  - Per capita: $10,600
- Time zone: UTC−3 (BST)
- Postal code: 60000-001 to 61599-999
- Area code: +55 85
- HDI (2010): 0.754 – high
- Website: fortaleza.ce.gov.br

Fortaleza (/ˌfɔːrtəˈleɪzə/ FOR-tə-LAY-zə; Brazilian Portuguese: [foʁtaˈlezɐ]; Portuguese for 'Fortress') is the state capital and largest city of the state of Ceará, located in Northeastern Brazil. It is Brazil's fourth-most-populous city after Sao Paulo, Rio De Janeiro, and Brasilia, with a population of 2,578,483 as of 2025, and 12th-largest among cities with the highest gross domestic product. It forms the core of the Fortaleza metropolitan area, which is home to almost 4 million people.

Fortaleza is an important industrial and commercial center Tourismof Northeast Brazil. According to the Ministry of Tourism, it is the fourth-most visited city and tourist destination in the country. The BR-116, the most important highway in the country, starts in Fortaleza. The municipality is part of the Mercosur common market, and a vital trade port which is closest to mainland Europe, being 5,608 kilometres (3,485 mi) from Lisbon, Portugal.

To the north of the city lies the Atlantic Ocean; to the south are the municipalities of Pacatuba, Eusébio, Maracanaú and Itaitinga; to the east is the municipality of Aquiraz and the Atlantic Ocean; and to the west is the municipality of Caucaia. Residents of the city are known as Fortalezenses. Fortaleza is one of the three leading cities in the Northeast region together with Recife and Salvador.

== History ==
=== Colonial period ===
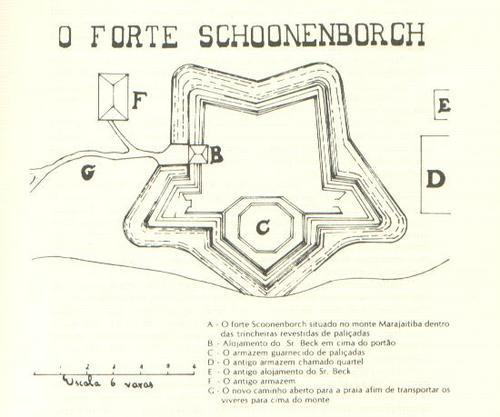
Plan of Fort Schoonenborch in 1649

Colonisation began in 1603 when Portugal was part of the Iberian Union, when the Portuguese Pero Coelho de Souza constructed the Fort of São Tiago and founded the settlement of Nova Lisboa (New Lisbon). After a victory over the French in 1612, Martins Soares Moreno expanded the Fort of São Tiago and changed its name to Forte de São Sebastião.

In 1630 the Dutch invaded the Brazilian Northeast and in 1637 they took the Fort of São Sebastião and ruled over Ceará. In battles with the Portuguese and natives in 1644 the fort was destroyed. Under captain Matthias Beck the Dutch West Indies Company built a new fortress by the banks of river Pajeú. Fort Schoonenborch ("graceful stronghold") officially opened on 19 August 1649. After the capitulation of Pernambuco in 1654, the Dutch handed over this fortress to the Portuguese, who renamed it Fortaleza da Nossa Senhora de Assunção ("Fortress of Our Lady of the Assumption"), after which the city of Fortaleza takes its name.

Fortaleza was officially founded as a village 1726, becoming the capital of Ceará state in 1799.

=== Imperial period ===
During the 19th century, Fortaleza was consolidated as an urban centre in Ceará, supported by the cotton industry. With the transformation of the city into a regional export center and with the increase of direct navigation to Europe, the customs building of Fortaleza was built in 1812. In 1824, the city was targeted by the revolutionaries of Confederation of the Equator.

=== Republican period ===
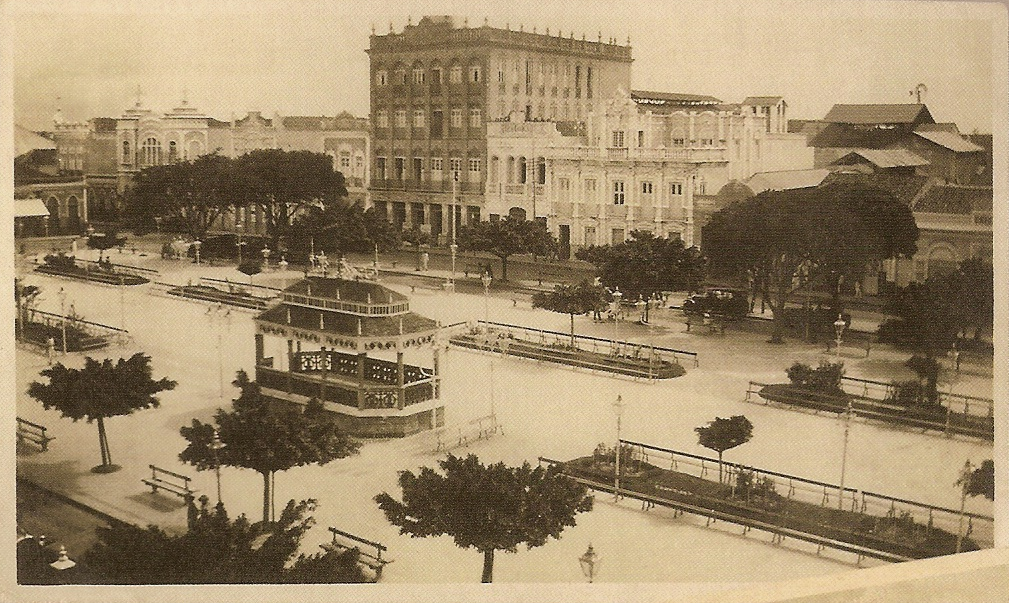
Ferreira Square in 1920

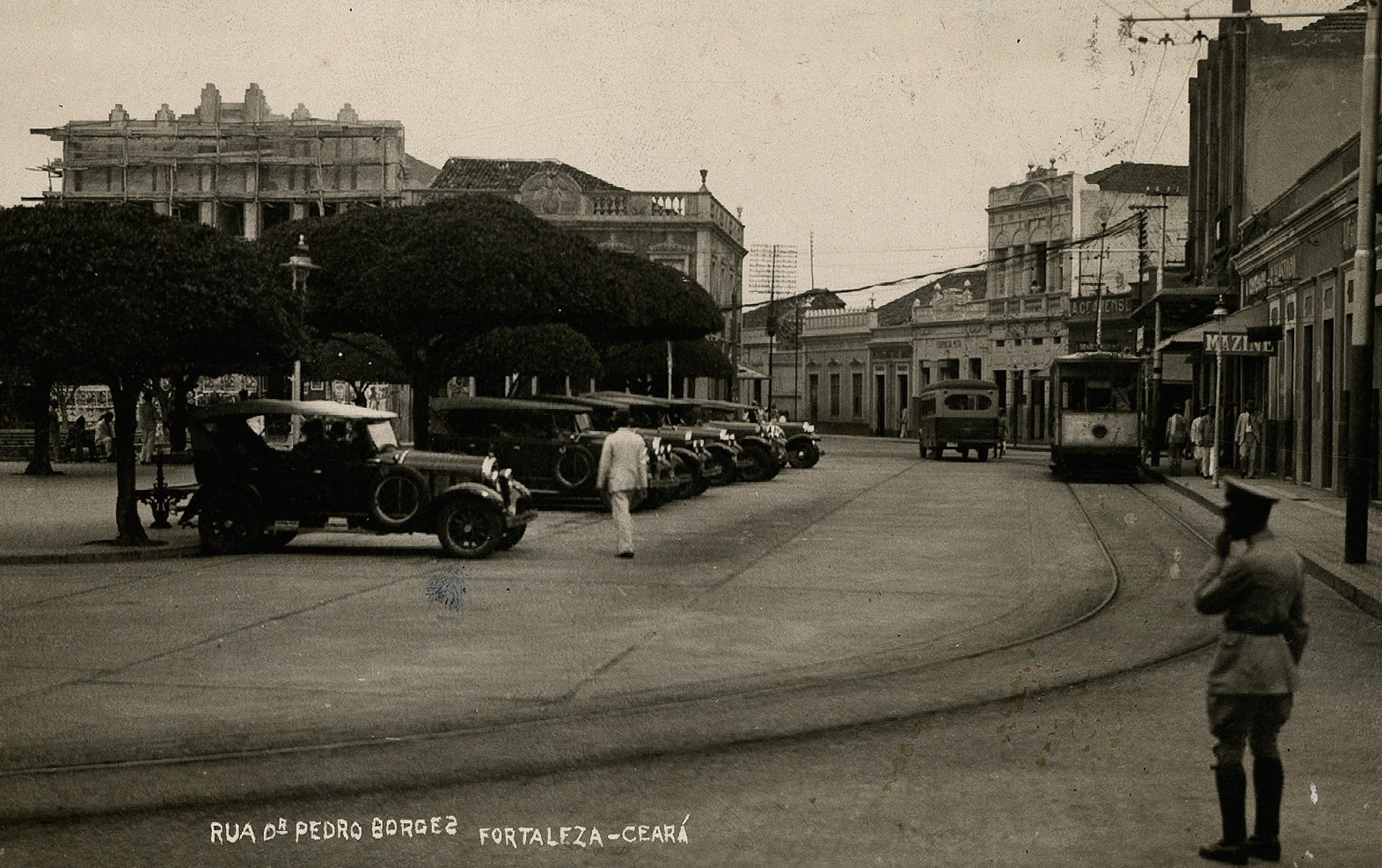
Fortaleza in 1935

The city gained a number of new districts in the 1930s, including Messejana and Porangaba. In 1954, the first university in the city was created, the Universidade Federal do Ceará (UFC).

In 1983, the city began to integrate the territory of the new city of Maracanaú, which, just some years ago, was made again part of the Greater Fortaleza (the city's Metropolitan area). In the 1980s, Fortaleza exceeded Recife in population terms, becoming the second most populous city in Northeastern Brazil, with 2,571,896 inhabitants.

== Geography ==
Location on a map of municipalities of Ceará

=== Climate ===
Fortaleza has a typical tropical climate, specifically a tropical wet and dry climate (Köppen climate classification: Aw/As), with high temperatures and relative humidity throughout the year. However, these conditions are usually relieved by pleasant winds blowing from the ocean. Average temperatures are not much different throughout the year. December is the warmest month, with a high of 31.7 °C (89.1 °F) and low of 24.9 °C (76.8 °F). The rainy season spans from January to July, with rainfall particularly prodigious in March and April. The average annual temperature is 27.0 °C (80.6 °F). The relative humidity in Fortaleza is 77.5%, with average annual rainfall of 1,584.0 millimetres (62.36 in). There is usually rain during the first seven months of the year from January to July. During this period, relative humidity is high. Fortaleza's climate is usually very dry from August to December, with very little rainfall.

Rainfall is akin to all of Northeastern Brazil among the most variable in the world, comparable (for similar average annual rainfalls) to central Queensland cities such as Townsville and Mackay. In the notorious drought year of 1877 as little as 468 millimetres or 18.43 inches fell, and in 1958 only 518 millimetres or 20.39 inches, but in the Nordeste's record wet year of 1985 Fortaleza received 2,841 millimetres or 111.85 inches.

Climate data for Fortaleza (1991–2020 normals, extremes 1931–present)
Month	Jan	Feb	Mar	Apr	May	Jun	Jul	Aug	Sep	Oct	Nov	Dec	Year
Record high °C (°F)	35.2 (95.4)	35.2 (95.4)	34.8 (94.6)	34.9 (94.8)	33.6 (92.5)	33.8 (92.8)	33.9 (93.0)	34.4 (93.9)	34.6 (94.3)	34.8 (94.6)	34.8 (94.6)	35.2 (95.4)	35.2 (95.4)
Mean daily maximum °C (°F)	31.2 (88.2)	31.1 (88.0)	30.8 (87.4)	30.6 (87.1)	30.8 (87.4)	30.5 (86.9)	30.6 (87.1)	31.1 (88.0)	31.4 (88.5)	31.6 (88.9)	31.7 (89.1)	31.7 (89.1)	31.1 (88.0)
Daily mean °C (°F)	27.4 (81.3)	27.3 (81.1)	27.0 (80.6)	26.8 (80.2)	26.8 (80.2)	26.4 (79.5)	26.2 (79.2)	26.6 (79.9)	27.0 (80.6)	27.4 (81.3)	27.7 (81.9)	27.8 (82.0)	27.0 (80.6)
Mean daily minimum °C (°F)	24.5 (76.1)	24.3 (75.7)	23.9 (75.0)	23.8 (74.8)	23.8 (74.8)	23.2 (73.8)	22.8 (73.0)	22.9 (73.2)	23.6 (74.5)	24.3 (75.7)	24.7 (76.5)	24.9 (76.8)	23.9 (75.0)
Record low °C (°F)	18.2 (64.8)	19.0 (66.2)	18.0 (64.4)	18.8 (65.8)	18.6 (65.5)	17.9 (64.2)	17.9 (64.2)	17.7 (63.9)	19.2 (66.6)	20.3 (68.5)	20.0 (68.0)	19.4 (66.9)	17.7 (63.9)
Average precipitation mm (inches)	156.4 (6.16)	187.0 (7.36)	336.9 (13.26)	385.0 (15.16)	229.0 (9.02)	130.0 (5.12)	69.7 (2.74)	20.0 (0.79)	13.6 (0.54)	9.5 (0.37)	9.8 (0.39)	37.1 (1.46)	1,584 (62.36)
Average precipitation days (≥ 1.0 mm)	13	14	20	21	16	10	7	3	3	3	3	5	118
Average relative humidity (%)	78.4	80.4	83.0	85.1	82.6	79.9	76.9	73.3	71.7	72.0	72.7	74.4	77.5
Average dew point °C (°F)	23.6 (74.5)	23.9 (75.0)	24.3 (75.7)	24.4 (75.9)	24.0 (75.2)	23.0 (73.4)	22.1 (71.8)	21.5 (70.7)	21.6 (70.9)	22.1 (71.8)	22.6 (72.7)	23.0 (73.4)	23.0 (73.4)
Mean monthly sunshine hours	220.4	183.0	172.7	152.8	211.9	219.2	254.2	288.5	287.1	294.2	287.7	274.2	2,845.9
Percentage possible sunshine	58	53	46	42	57	61	69	78	79	78	78	72	64
Average ultraviolet index	12	12	12	12	11	10	10	11	12	12	12	12	12
Source 1: Brazilian National Institute of Meteorology (INMET)
Source 2: NOAA (dew point) and Weather Atlas (uv index)

=== Vegetation ===
In Fortaleza there are some remaining areas of mangrove in preserved areas, including Cocó Park. Ten miles offshore is the Pedra da Risca do Meio Marine State Park, created in 1997 to protect the reefs.

=== Ecology and environment ===
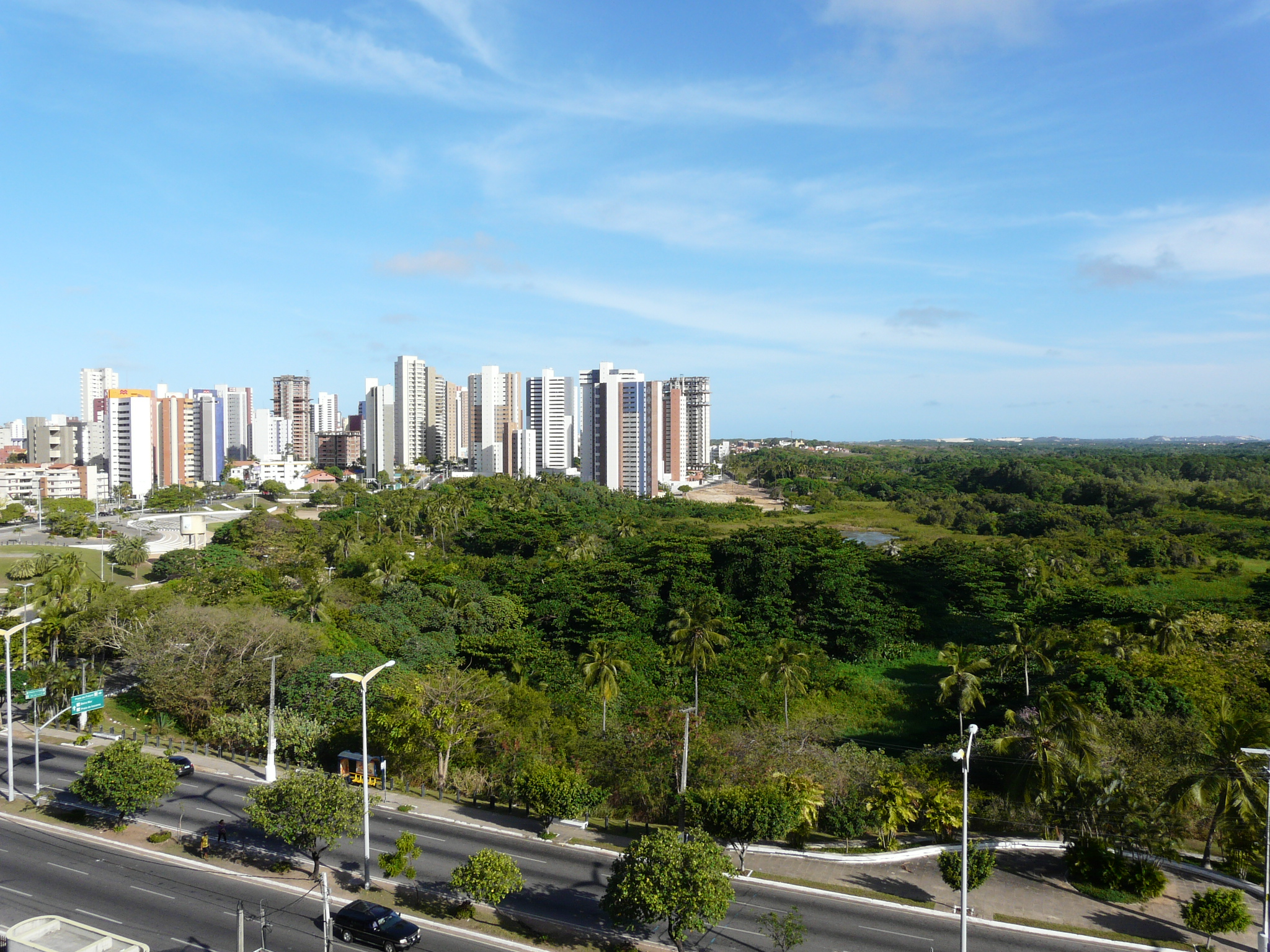
Cocó Park, considered one of the largest urban parks in Latin America, is the most important green area of the city.

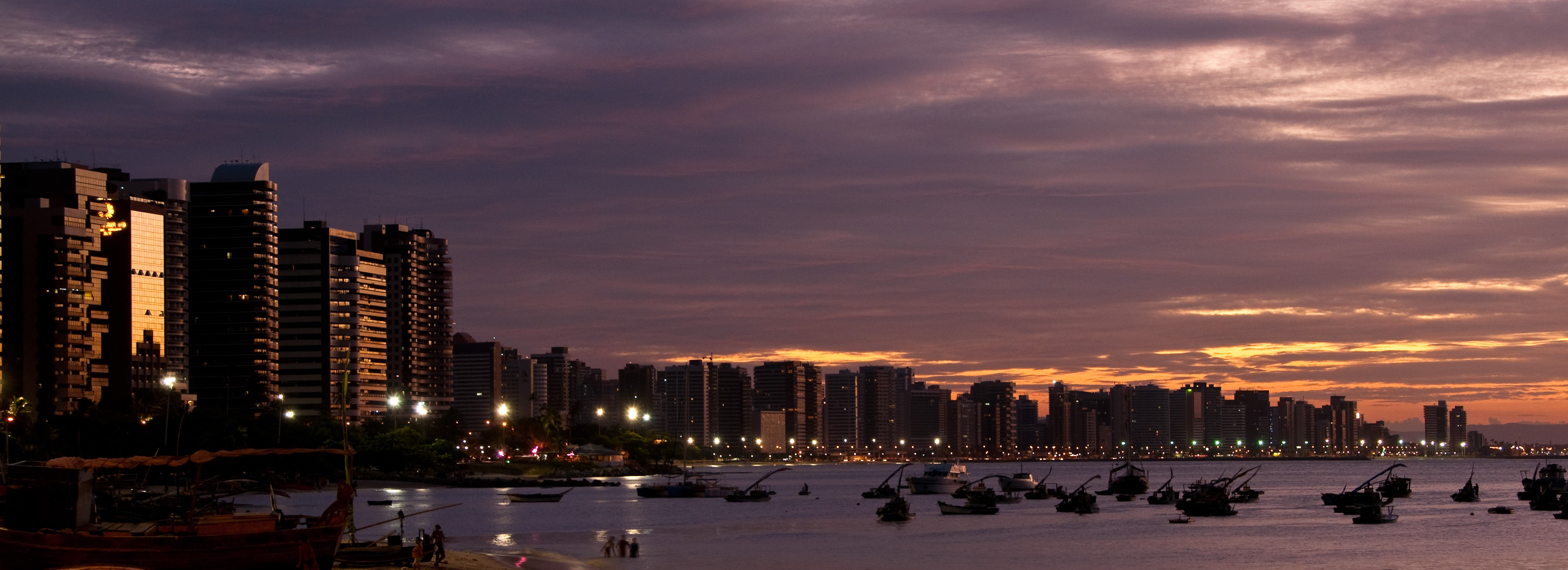
Fortaleza bay during sunset

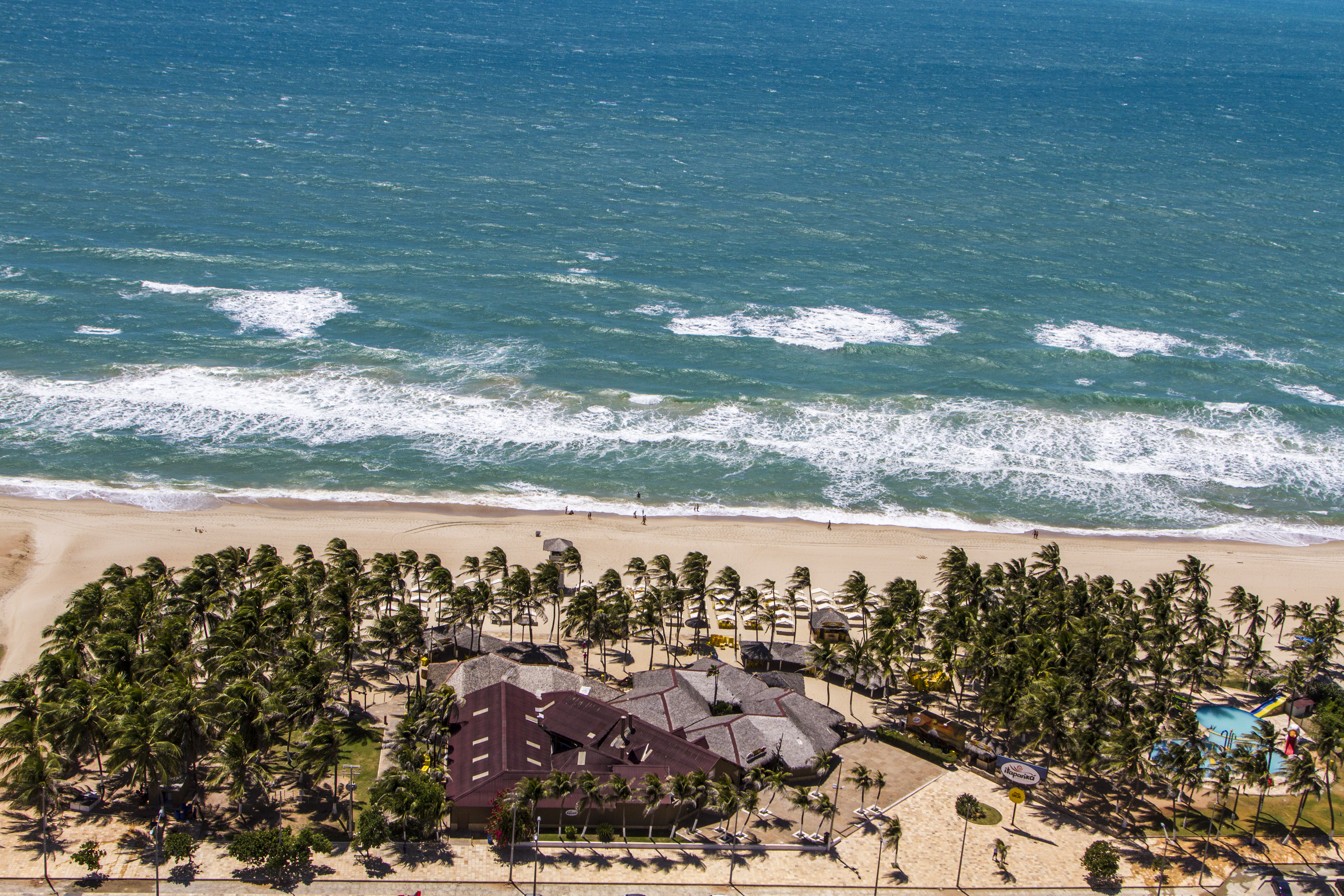
Futuro beach in Fortaleza

The vegetation of Fortaleza is typically coastal. The restinga areas are found in dune regions near the mouths of the Ceará, Cocó and Pacoti rivers, in the beds of which there is still a mangrove forest. In other green areas of the city, there is no longer native vegetation, consisting of varied vegetation, fruit trees primarily. The city is home to seven environmental conservation units. These are the Sabiaguaba Dunes Municipal Natural Park, the Sabiaguaba Environmental Protection Area, the Maraponga Lagoon Ecological Park, the Cocó Ecological Park, the Ceará River Estuary Environmental Protection Area, the Environmental Protection Area of the Rio Pacoti and the Pedra da Risca do Meio Marine State Park. There is also, in the city, the Area of Relevant Ecological Interest of Sírio Curió, that protects the last enclave of Atlantic Forest in the urban zone.

The Cocó River is part of the river basin of the east coast of Ceará and has a total length of about 50 km in its main area. The park is inserted in the area of greater environmental sensitivity of the city, where it is possible to identify geoenvironmental formations such as coastal plain, fluvial plain and surface of the coastal trays. The Cocó river mangrove is home to mollusks, crustaceans, fish, reptiles, birds and mammals. The park has a structure of visitation, with guides, ecological trails and equipment and events of environmental education and ecotourism. The Coaçu River, affluent of the river Cocó, forms in its bed the lagoon of the Precabura.

The Rio Pacoti provides much of the water supply for Fortaleza. At the municipal boundary with Caucaia, the estuary of the Rio Ceará is covered by an environmental protection area (APA), which was set up in 1999.

== Demographics ==
Race and ethnicity in Fortaleza
Ethnicity	Percentage
Pardo (Multiracial)	60.0%
White	32.7%
Black	7.0%
Asian	0.1%
Amerindian	0.1%

According to the 2022 census, there were 2,428,708 people residing in the city of Fortaleza. The census revealed the following numbers: 1,456,901 Pardo (multiracial) people (60%), 793,975 White people (32.7%), 171,018 Black people (7%), 3,127 Asian people (0.1%), 3,000 Amerindian people (0.1%).

In 2010, the city of Fortaleza was the fifth–most populous city proper in Brazil, after São Paulo, Rio de Janeiro, Salvador, and Brasília. Currently, Fortaleza is the fourth-largest city in Brazil in terms of population. In 2010, the city had 433,942 opposite-sex couples and 1,559 same-sex couples. The population of Fortaleza was 53.2% female and 46.8% male.

The following cities are included in the metropolitan area of Fortaleza (ordered by population): Fortaleza, Caucaia, Maracanaú, Maranguape, Aquiraz, Pacatuba, Pacajus, Horizonte, São Gonçalo do Amarante, Itatinga, Guaiúba and Chorozinho.

According to a genetic study from 2011, 'pardos' and whites' from Fortaleza, which comprise the largest share of the population, showed European ancestry of about 70%, the rest divided between Native American and African ancestries. A 2015 study, however, found out the following composition in Fortaleza: 48.9% of European contribution, 35.4% of Native American input and 15.7% of African ancestry.

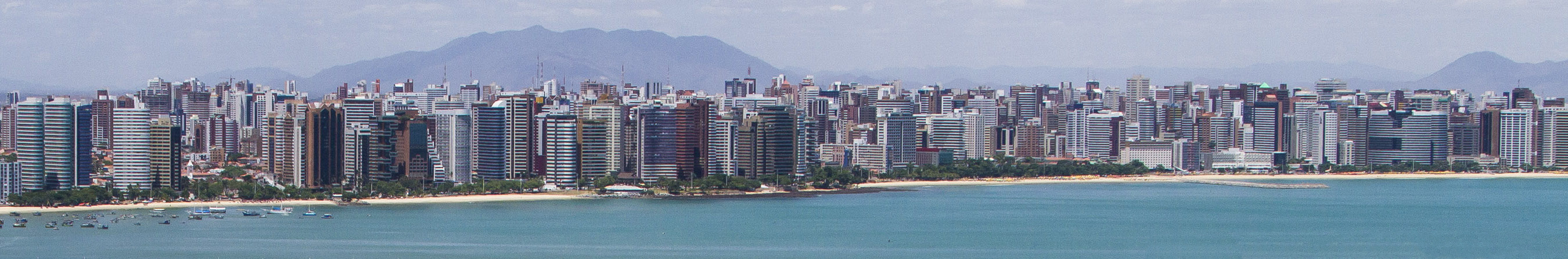
View of Fortaleza

=== Religion ===
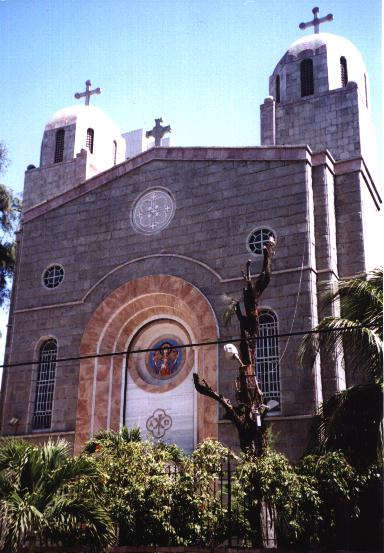
Church of Our Lady of Lebanon, one of the four Melkite Greek Catholic Church in Brazil.

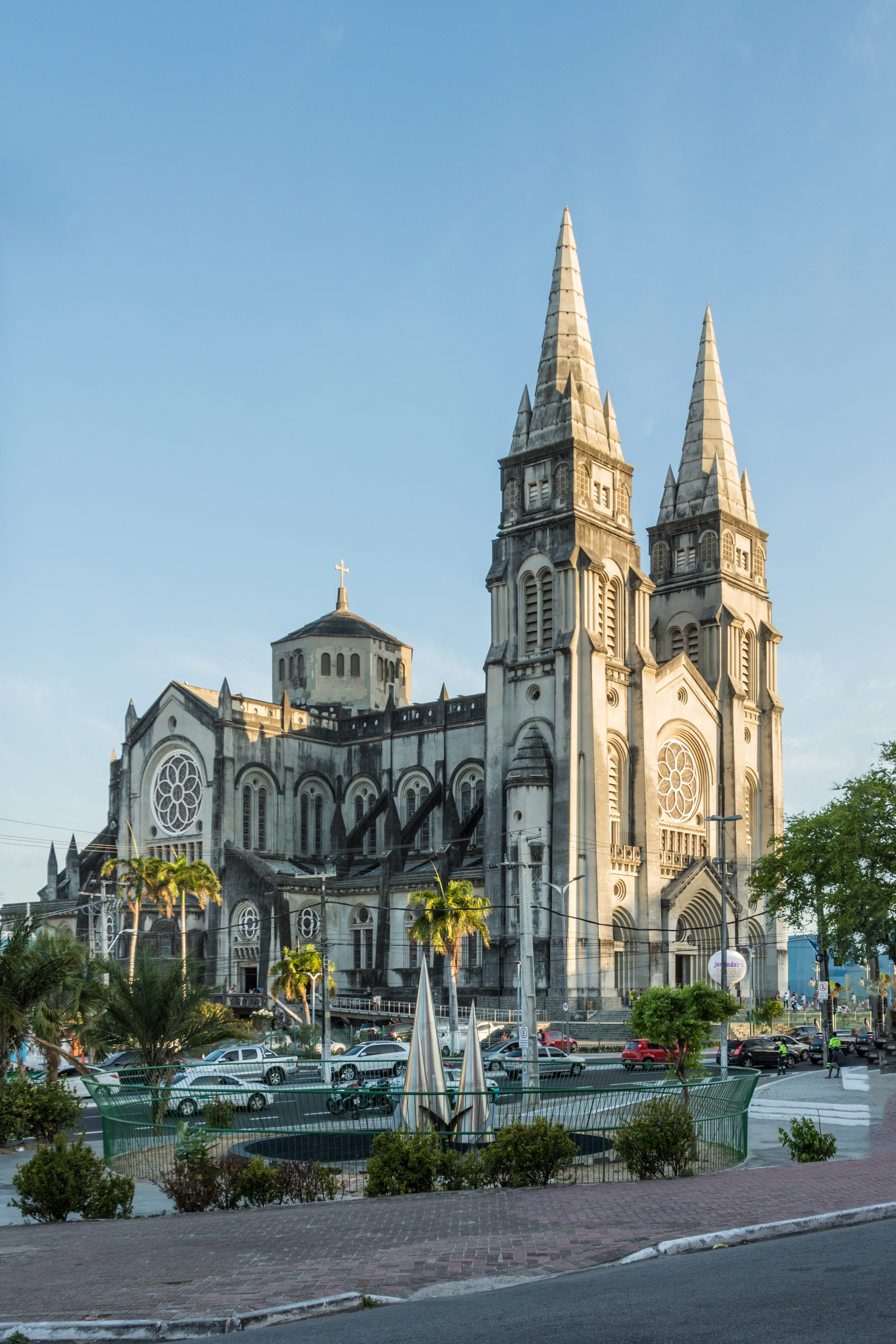
Metropolitan Cathedral of Fortaleza, the country's third biggest.

The prevailing religion of Fortaleza is the Roman Catholic branch of Christianity.

Religious affiliation	Percentage	Number
Catholic	79.0%	1,691,487
Protestant	12.58%	269,469
No religion	5.99%	128,190
Kardecist	0.83%	17,780
Jehovah's Witnesses	0.64%	13,758
Other religions	0.7%	15,923

Source: IBGE 2000.

According to the census of 2010, 1,664,521 people, 67.88% of the population, followed Roman Catholicism, 523,456 (21.35%) were Protestant, 31,691 (1.29%) represented Spiritism and 162,985 (6.65%) had no religion whatsoever. Other religions, such as Umbanda, Candomblé, other Afro-Brazilian religions, Spiritualism, Judaism, Hinduism, Buddhism, Islam, other Eastern religions, Esotericism and other Christian churches like the Church of Jesus Christ of Latter-day Saints (Mormons) had a smaller number of adherents.

== Politics ==
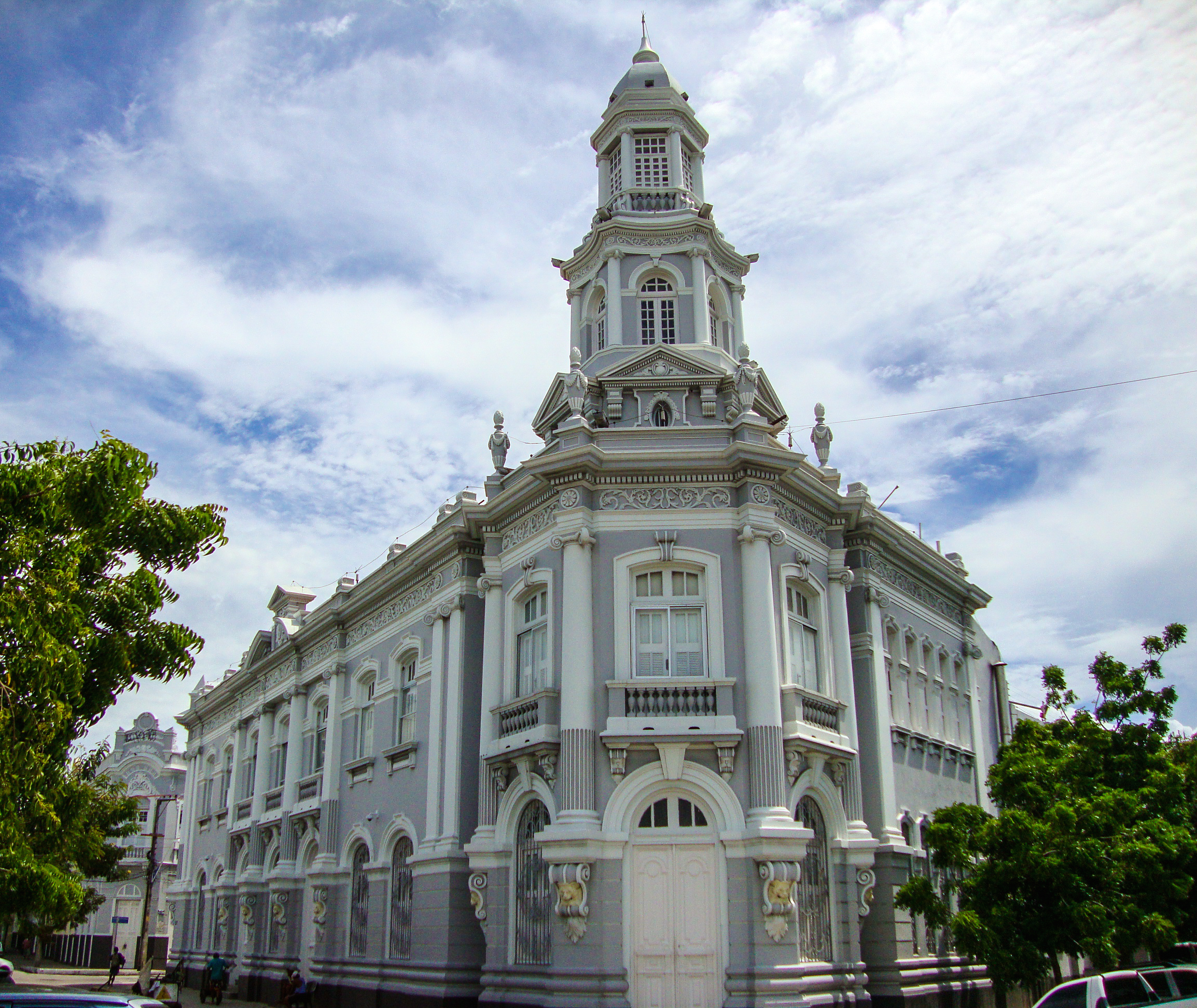
Edson Ramalho Palace, seat of Ceará's Economy Secretariat.

The administration of the municipality is made from the executive and legislative branches. Former mayor Roberto Cláudio, of the PDT, won 650,607 votes in the 2012 election, and was elected mayor. Legislative power rests with the City Council of Fortaleza, composed of 43 city councilors, elected for four-year terms, responsible for drafting municipal laws and supervising the executive. The municipality is, in addition, governed by organic law. In January 2015, there were 1,659,091 voters in Fortaleza (26.457% of the total state), distributed in thirteen electoral zones. The number of persons directly and indirectly employed in the municipal public administration in 2013 was respectively 31,318 and 4,950.

The city also houses the seat of state executive power, the Abolition Palace, previously occupied by former governor Camilo Santana, of the PT, elected in the general elections in Brazil in 2014. historically headquarters of the Iracema Club, which was Ceded to the Municipal Hall and now houses municipal executive bodies. In the city, there is the Administrative Center Governor Virgílio Távora.

Among the institutions present in the city, are the Fortaleza Air Base, the Port Authority of Ceará, School of Apprentice Sailors of Ceará and the Command of the Tenth Military Region. The city also has units of the International Committee of the Red Cross and UNICEF. Since 1996, a city is part of the Common Market of Cities of Mercosur.

== Economy ==
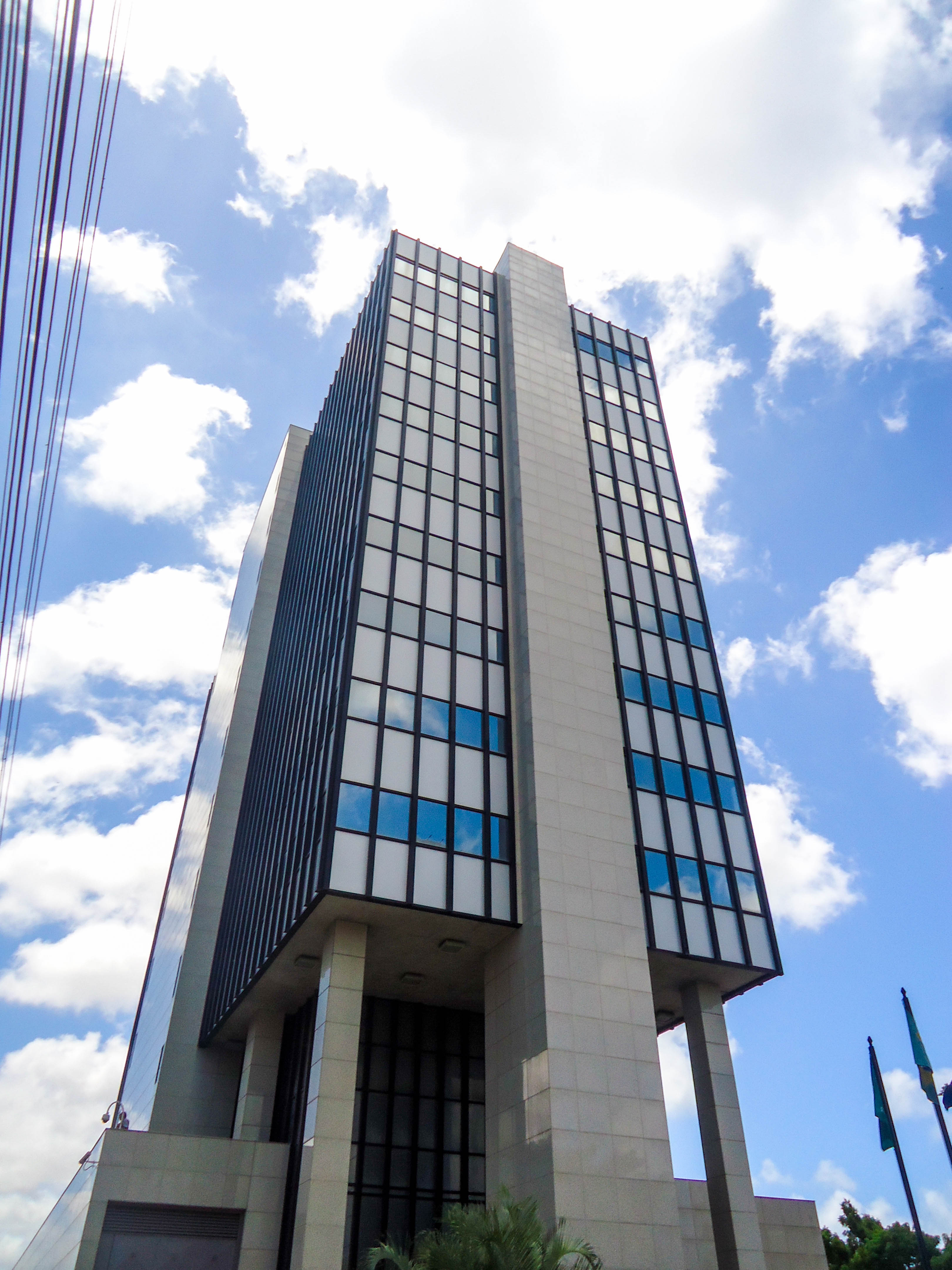
Central Bank of Brazil in Fortaleza.

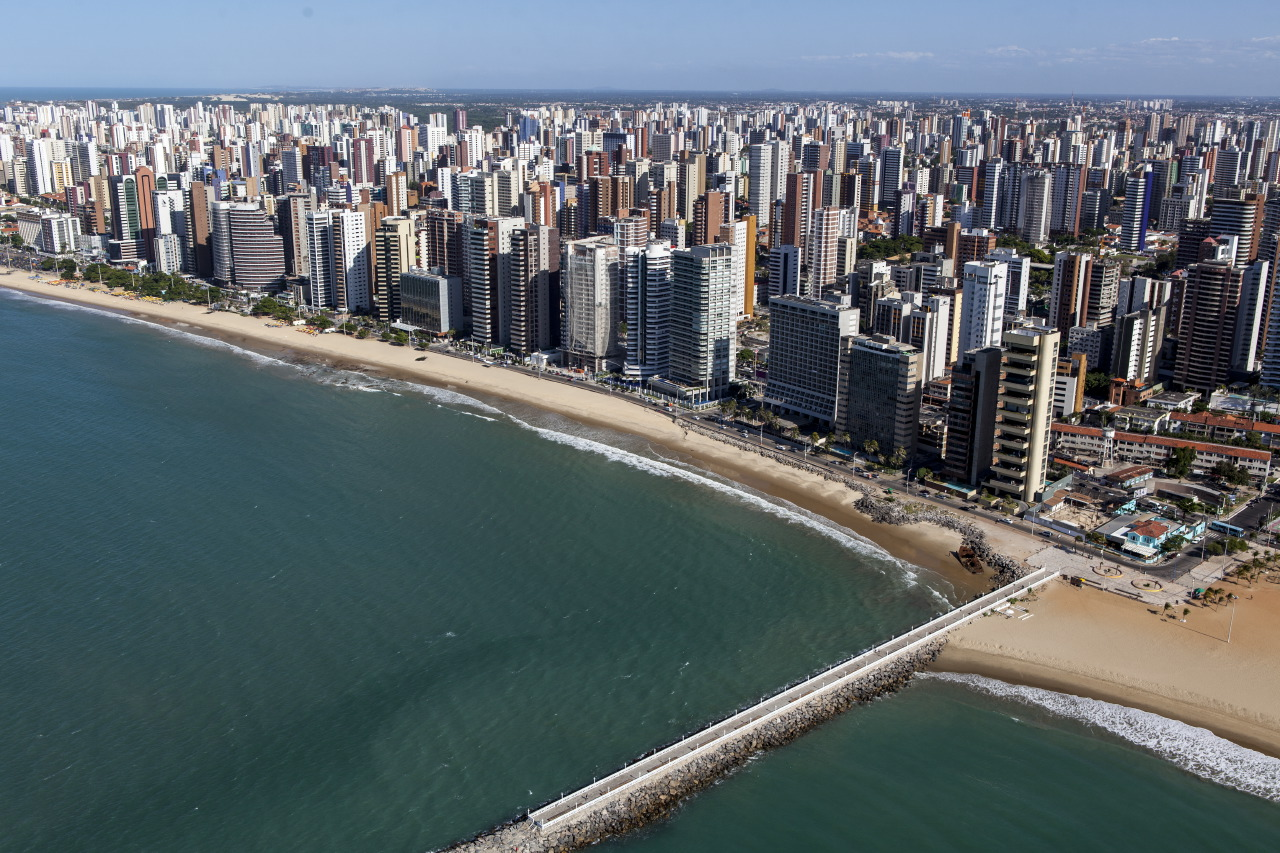
Aerial view of downtown Fortaleza

Fortaleza has the largest Gross Domestic Product (GDP) in the Northeast Region, surpassing Recife and Salvador. In 2021, the GDP of Fortaleza reached the value of 73.4 billion Reais, the eleventh highest of the country. In the same year, the value of taxes on products net of subsidies at current prices was R$12,811,311,235 and the municipality's GDP per capita was R$27.164,45. The city's booming economy is reflected in purchasing power, the country's eighth largest, with estimated consumption potential at 42 billion reais in 2014.

The main economic source of the municipality is centered in the tertiary sector, with its diversified segments of commerce and service rendering. Next, the secondary sector stands out, with the industrial complexes. In 2021, the city had 848,283 people in employment.

== Culture ==
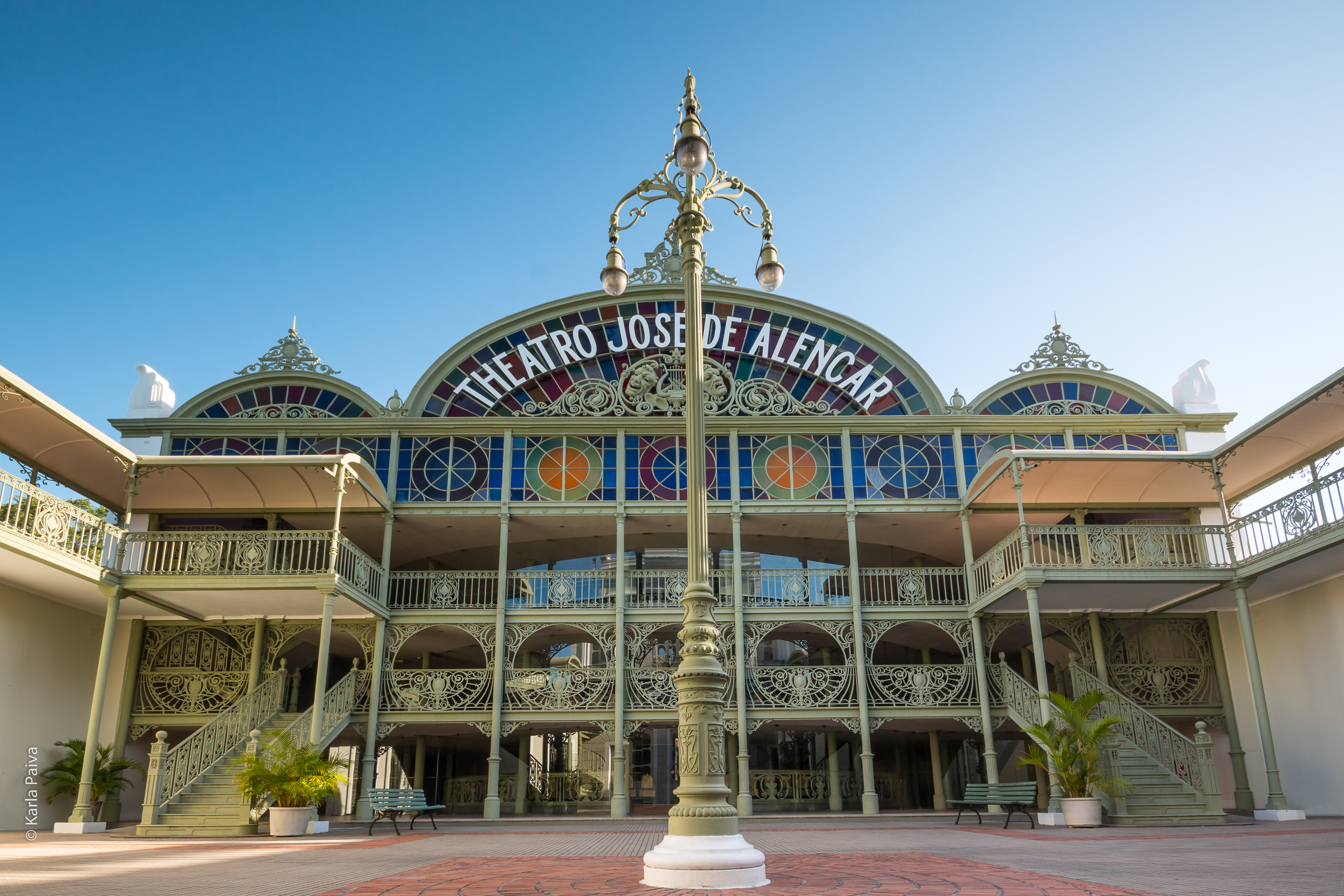
Inner front of the Theatro José de Alencar.

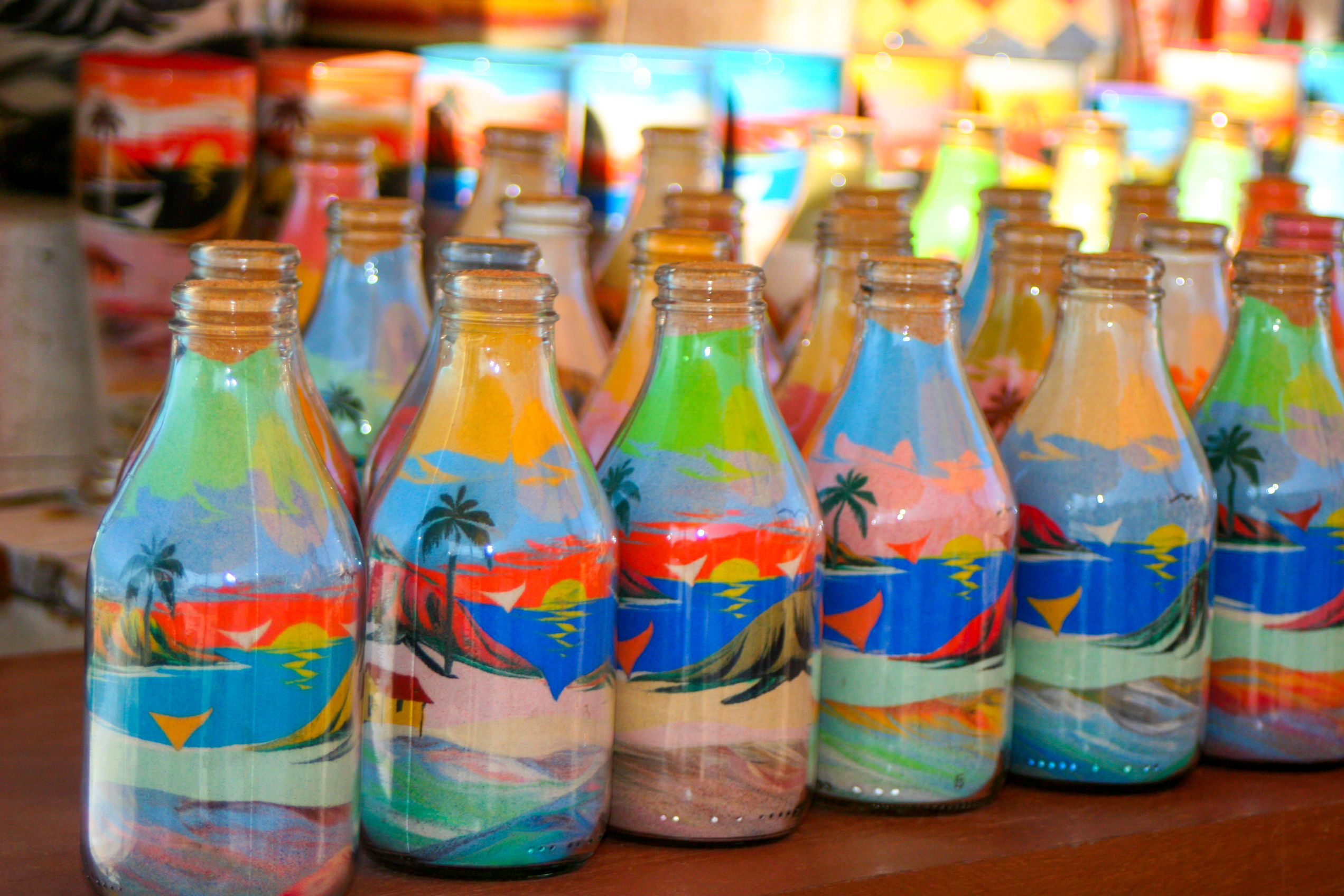
Sand art, originating in Ceará, is one of the most present items in the city's craft centers.

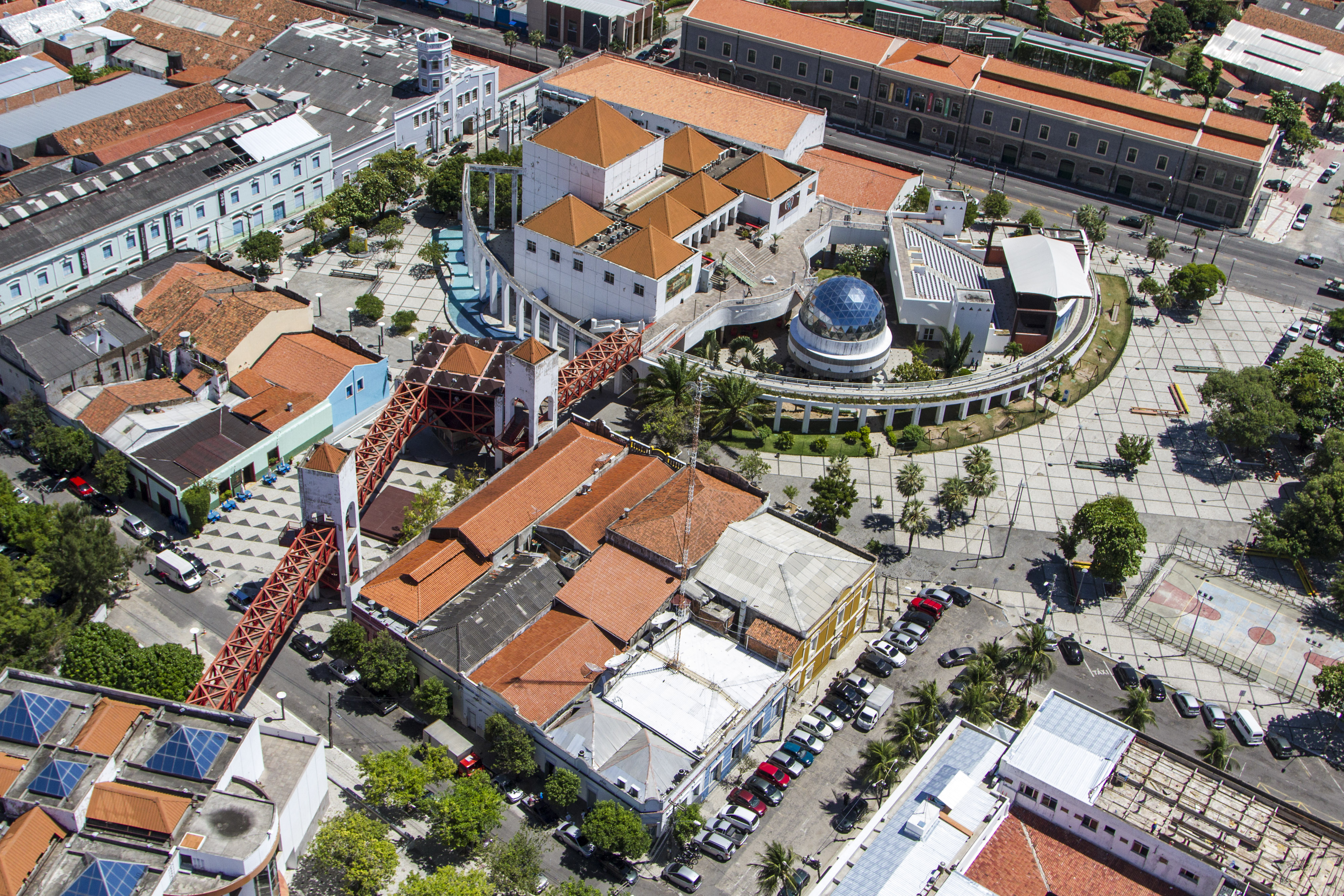
Dragão do Mar Cultural Center

According to the Master Plan of Fortaleza, the Special Areas for the Preservation of Historic, Cultural and Archaeological Heritage are the regions of the center, Parangaba, Alagadiço Novo/José de Alencar, Benfica, Porangabuçu and Praia de Iracema. Properties of conservation interest. The architectural heritage of Fortaleza in the form of fallen goods, however, is predominantly concentrated in the center of the city. The Mucuripe Lighthouse is unfortunately in ruins today, Ceará and Fortaleza were part of the pioneering group of states and cities to adopt public policies to protect the living intangible heritage of their culture, through the Masters of Culture program. The city is recognized as a "Design City" by UNESCO's Creative Cities Network.

=== Museums, theatres and cultural spaces ===
Among the theaters, the largest and most popular are Theatro José de Alencar, São José Theater, São Luiz Cinema Theater, and Teatro RioMar and Teatro Via Sul. The Ceará Museum houses numerous artifacts, including pieces of paleontology and furniture. The Dragão do Mar Center of Art and Culture is the main cultural centre, and includes the Ceará Museum of Culture, the Museum of Contemporary Art of Ceará, theaters, a planetarium, cinemas, shops and spaces for public presentations, as well as housing the Public Library Governador Menezes Pimentel, Oporto Iracema of the Arts and the School of Arts and Crafts Thomaz Pompeu Sobrinho. The Casa de José de Alencar is one of the Brazilian museums recognised as dealing with Brazilian literature. It was opened in 1964 and houses art collections, a gallery, a library and the ruins of the first steam power plant in Ceará. In the different SERs of the city, the complexes of the CUCA Network are spread, which are facilities dedicated to art, leisure and education, especially for young people.

Freemasonry is represented by the Grand Masonic Lodge of Ceará and the Great State East of Ceará. There are also service clubs in the city, such as the Lions Club and Rotary International.

The Ceará handicraft has its main market and showcase in Fortaleza. In the city, there are several specific places for trade in handicraft products, such as the Ceará Craft Center (CeArt), Ceará Tourism Center (Emcetur), Crafts Fair of Beira-Mar, and on Avenida Monsenhor Tabosa.

=== Literature and cinema ===
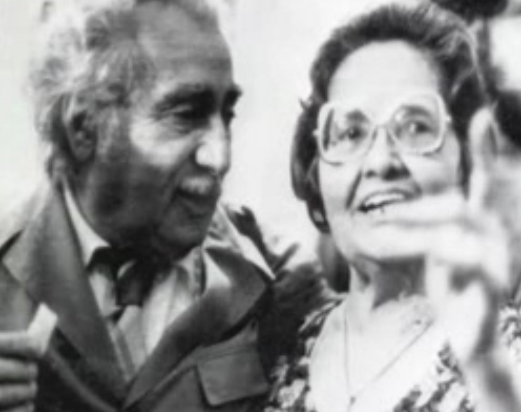
Rachel de Queiroz, the first immortal of the Brazilian Academy of Letters and winner of the Camões Prize.

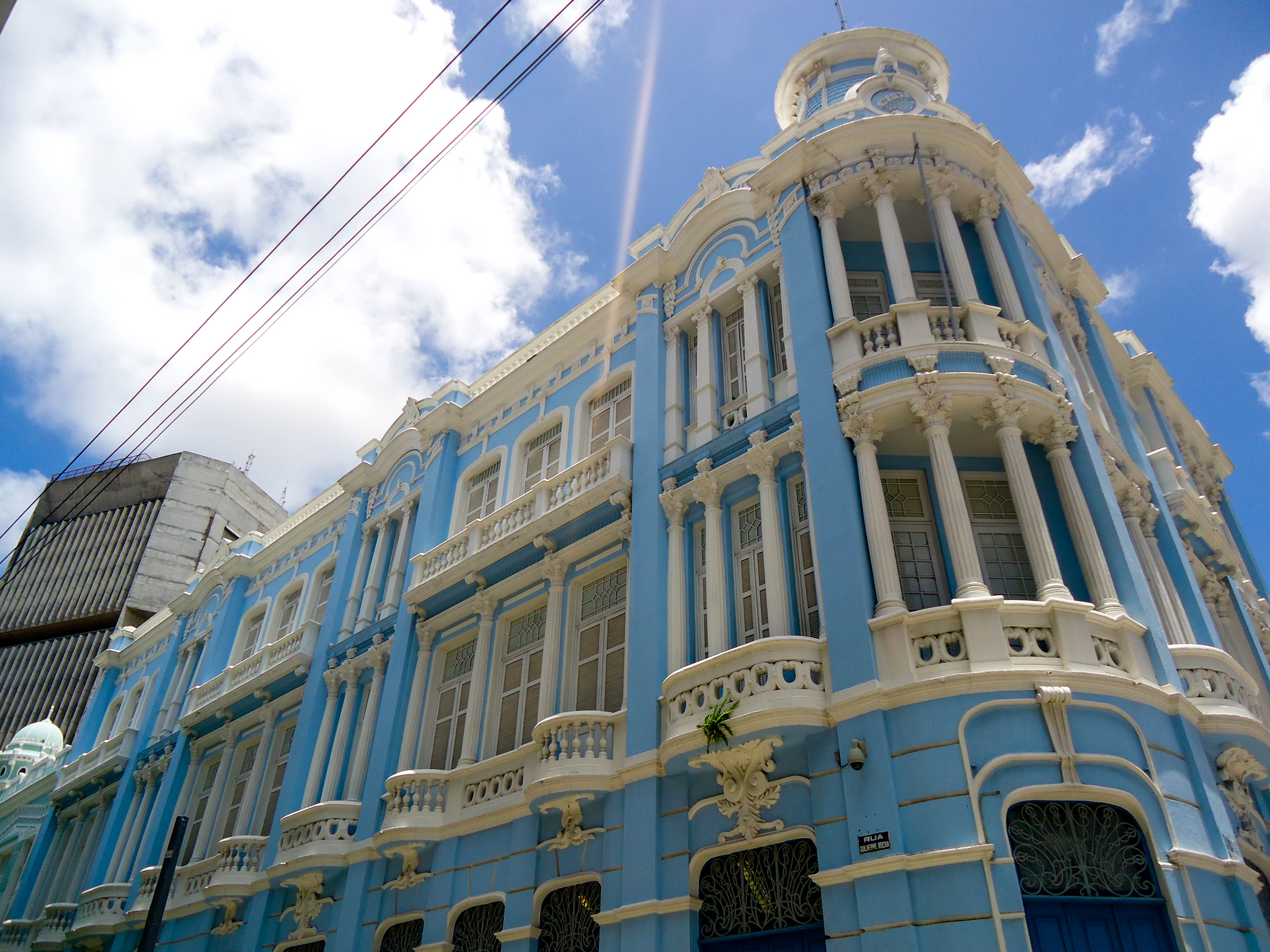
Ceará Palace, former seat of the Cearense Academy of Letters.

The main literary manifestation of Fortaleza's history emerged at the end of the 19th century, in the cafes of Praça do Ferreira, known as the Spiritual Bakery, a pioneer in the dissemination of modern ideas in Brazilian literature that would only be adopted nationally in the following century, in the Modern Art Week. The most important historical entities of high culture still present in the city are the Ceará Institute and the Ceará Academy of Letters, the first academy of letters created in Brazil, founded in 1887 and 1894 respectively. The Ceará Institute has helped launch important names in national historiography and philosophy, such as Farias Brito and Capistrano de Abreu. Among the writers who are members of the Cearense Academy of Letters and members or patrons of the Brazilian Academy of Letters, are Gustavo Barroso, Araripe Júnior, José de Alencar, Heráclito Graça, Franklin Tavora, Clóvis Beviláqua and Rachel de Queiroz, the first woman to be part of the entity. The Casa de Juvenal Galeno is another historical cultural institution of Fortaleza, named after one of the greatest poets born in the city, Juvenal Galeno. The house became well-known for its festivals of poetry and seminaries.

In cinema, the most well-known name is Zelito Viana, director of films like Villa-Lobos: A Life of Passion and Life and Death of Severina. More recently, Karim Aïnouz has directed Madame Satã, Suely in the Sky and Futuro Beach, and script of Lower City, Cinema, Aspirins and Vultures and Behind the Sun. Another current exponent of cinema born in Fortaleza is Halder Gomes, director and screenwriter of Holliúdy Cinema. New filmmakers in the city have gained in recent years prominent exhibitions such as at the Rio de Janeiro International Film Festival. The most traditional cinema event in Fortaleza is the Cine Ceará (Ibero-American Film Festival), considered one of the main festivals of the country.

=== Fashion ===
The main fashion name in the city is the Lino Villaventura, who, from Fortaleza, designed himself nationally and internationally and today is one of the main names of São Paulo Fashion Week, besides being one of the founding designers of this fashion week. There are major events in the city, such as the Dragão Fashion Brasil, considered the largest fashion event in the Northeast and the third largest in the country.

Much of the clothing that is produced in Ceará flows through Fortaleza, which in turn is recognized as one of the most important textile centers of the country, giving the garment industry great weight in the metropolitan economy. Brands of the city like Santana Textiles and headquarters of brands like Esplanada and Otoch have considerable regional influence.

=== Music ===
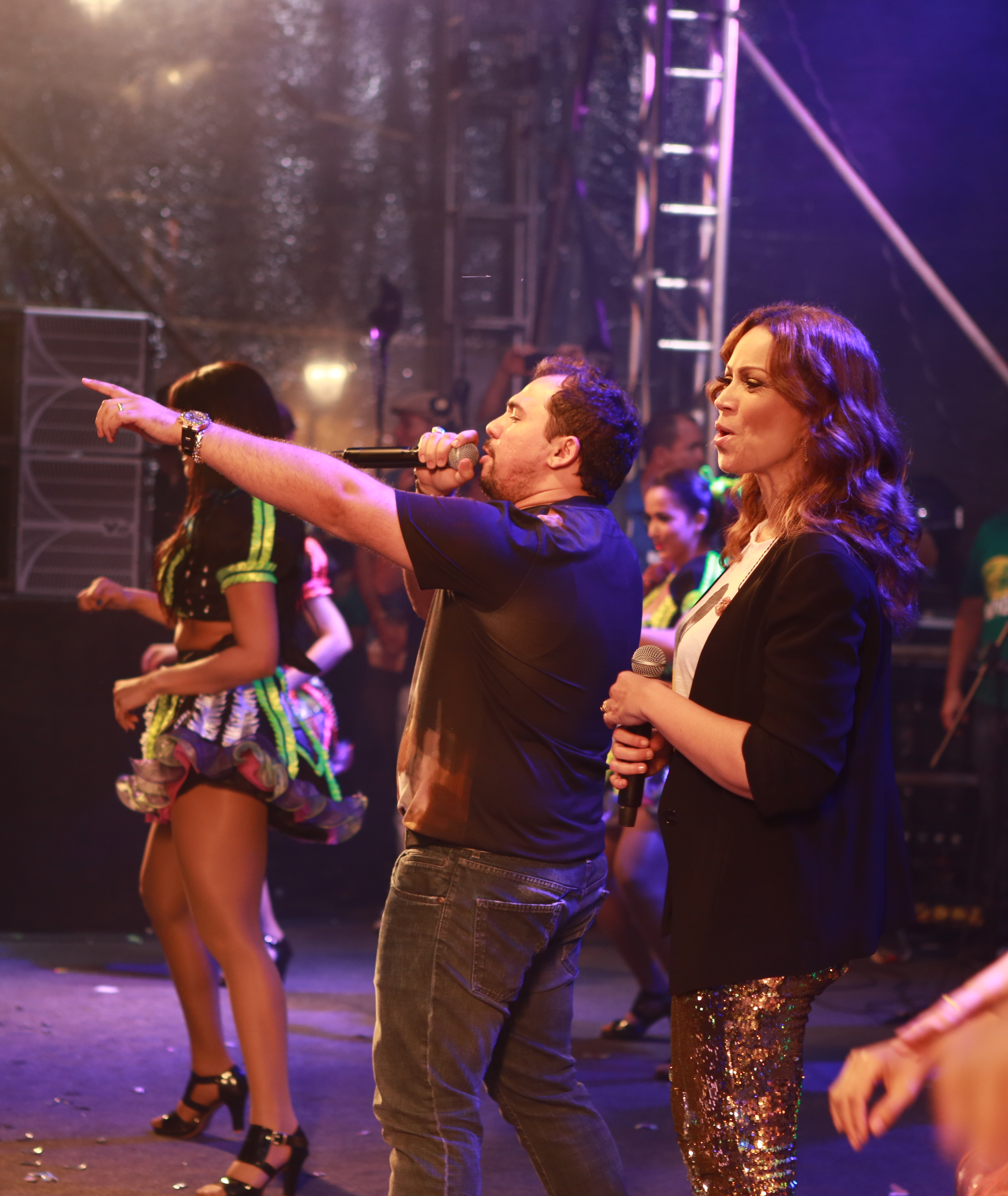
Aviões do Forró, the biggest forró band in the country

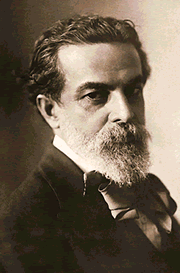
Alberto Nepomuceno, the "father" of nationalism of the Brazilian erudite music.

Forró is the most popular musical genre in the city. Bands originating in Fortaleza, such as Desejo de Menina and Aviões do Forró, were responsible for the popularization of electronic forró, which promoted the revaluation of the accordion in the genre and brought it closer to pop music. The forró pé-de serra, however, still holds great cultural influence and commercial prominence in the city.

In Música popular brasileira, some of the names from Fortaleza were Fagner, Ednardo, Belchior (from Sobral but lived in Fortaleza) and Amelinha. The musical tradition of Fortaleza, however, goes back to the composer Alberto Nepomuceno, one of the greatest names in classical music in Brazil, a pioneer in the development of the country's musical nationalism, and therefore considered the "founder of Brazilian music". The Alberto Nepomuceno Conservatory is one of the city's leading music schools.

=== Carnival ===
Fortaleza hosts one of the noted Brazilian Carnivals. Its main locations are Iracema Beach and Avenue Domingos Olimpio.

=== Cuisine ===
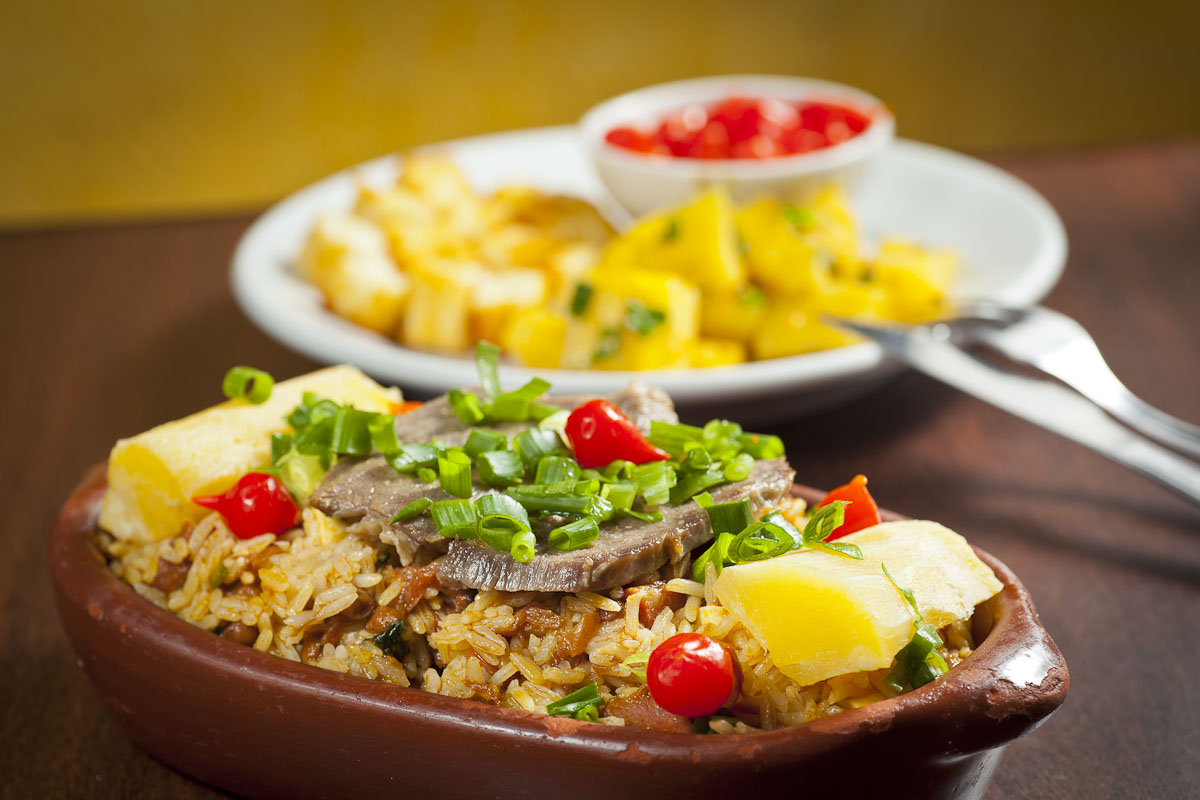
The Baião de dois a typical dish from Ceará.

The gastronomy of Fortaleza is very close to the typical Northeastern cuisine, and, traditional include the baião de dois, usually accompanied by barbecue of mutton or sun-dried meat ("carne de sol"), and tapioca which is a pancake made from the starch of cassava. The seafood is another ingredient of typical dishes of fortalezeense cuisine, such as the steak moqueca and the mackerel and snapper fish.

Crab is a staple of Ceará's seafood. Shrimp and lobster are also widely used delicacies in dishes such as shrimp rice or shrimp dumplings.

== Tourism ==
Beyond its beaches, Fortaleza offers a broad historical and cultural tourism circuit. Major attractions include the Fortress of Our Lady of the Assumption, Metropolitan Cathedral, Theatro José de Alencar, Central Market, Passeio Público, Estação das Artes and the Dragão do Mar Center of Art and Culture. Along the coast, Praia de Iracema and the Beira-Mar promenade bring together the English Bridge, Fish Market, Japanese Garden, craft market and public leisure areas, while Praia do Futuro remains one of the city’s main beach-tourism destinations, known for its long shoreline and facilities dedicated to gastronomy, recreation and water sports.

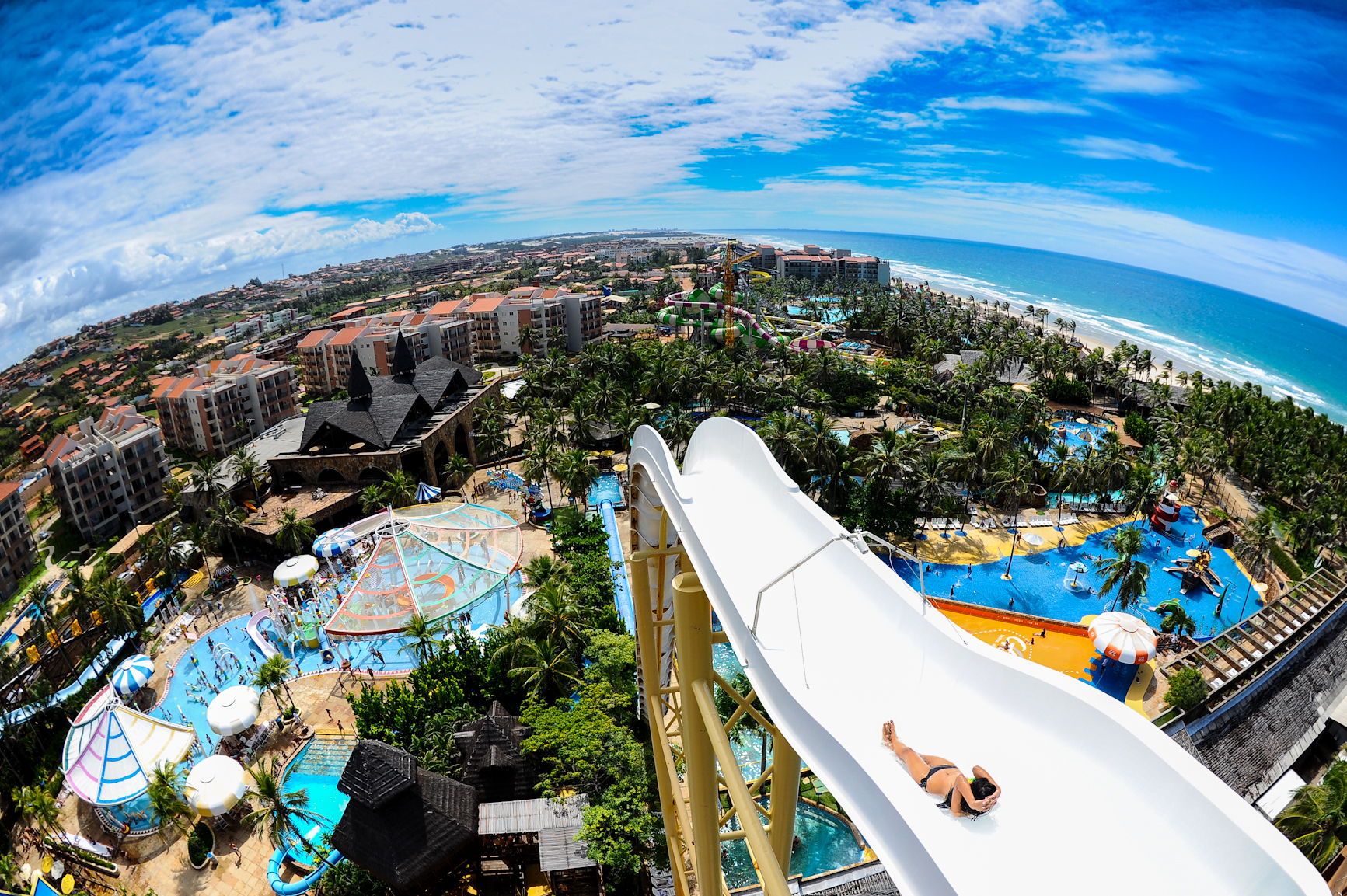
Beach Park is the largest water park in Latin America

Acquario Ceará, due to be one of the largest oceanariums in Brazil, is currently under construction. Attractions such as the Beach Park theme park, located in the Great Fortaleza, Avenida Beira Mar and its bars, restaurants and music clubs, the beaches of Futuro and Iracema and Pirata Bar have placed Fortaleza among the Brazilian destinations preferred by Europeans.

Scuba diving is possible in the area of Pedra da Risca do Meio Marine State Park, a marine protected area located about 10 nautical miles from the shoreline of Fortaleza.

Fortaleza has about 25 kilometres (16 mi) of urban beaches. Mucuripe is the place where jangadas can be found. Still used by fishermen to go into high seas, jangadas can be seen along the way during the afternoon and evenings, and returning from the sea in the morning; part of the catch of the day is sold in an old-style fish market.

== Education ==
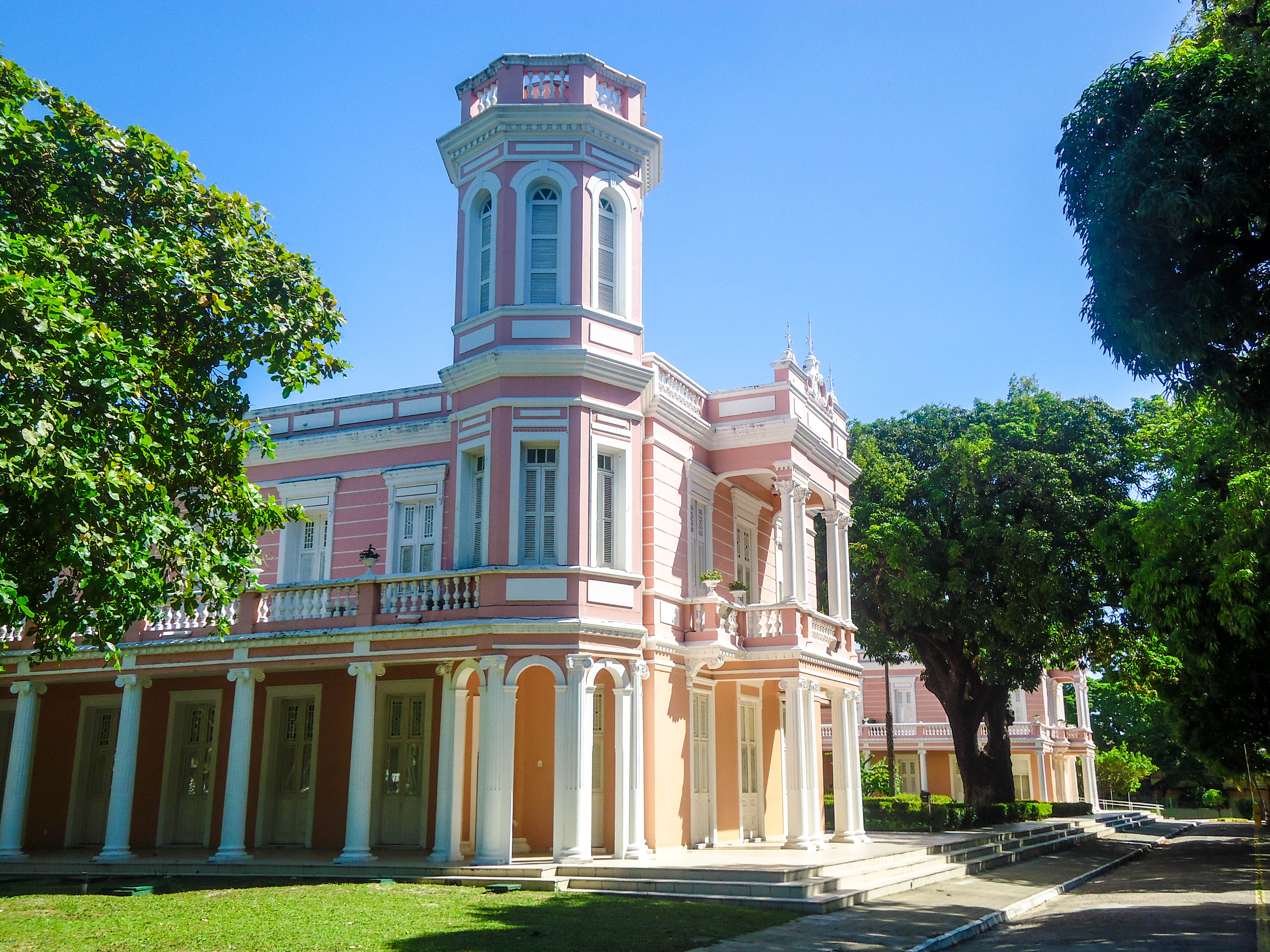
In 2016 the Federal University of Ceará located in Fortaleza was classified as the 10th best university in Brazil, 1st in the North and Northeast regions and the best university in Ceará.

In 2010, the level of the education factor of the Strengthening Human Development Index was medium, despite its great advance, which went from 0.367 to 0.695 between 1991 and 2010. According to data from the 2010 Human Development Atlas of Brazil, Fortaleza's adult education levels were divided as follows: 8.57% did not complete primary school or were illiterate, 62.43% had completed elementary education, 45.93% had completed high school and 13.73% had completed higher education.

== Health ==
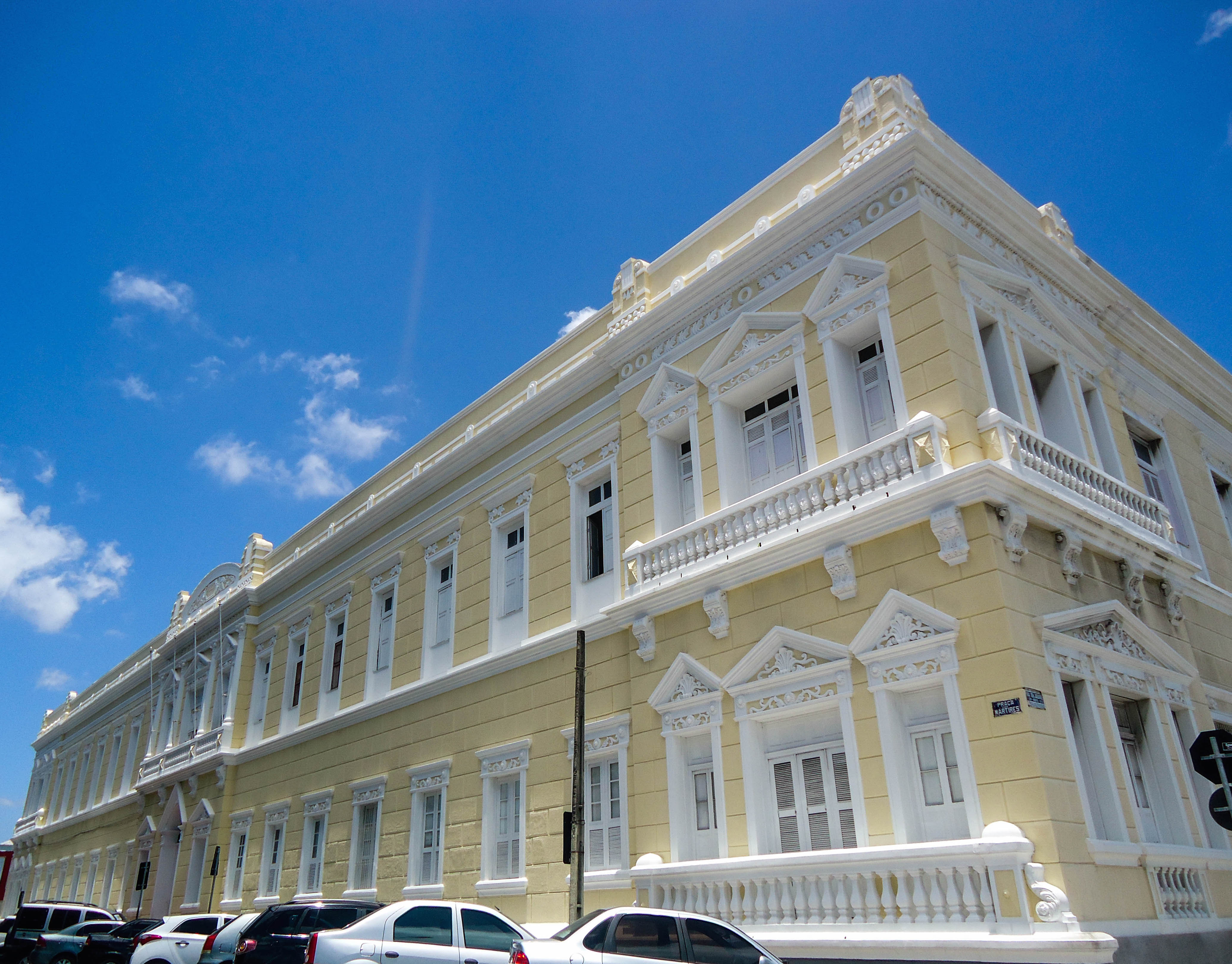
Santa Casa de Misericórdia de Fortaleza, first public hospital built in the city, in 1861.

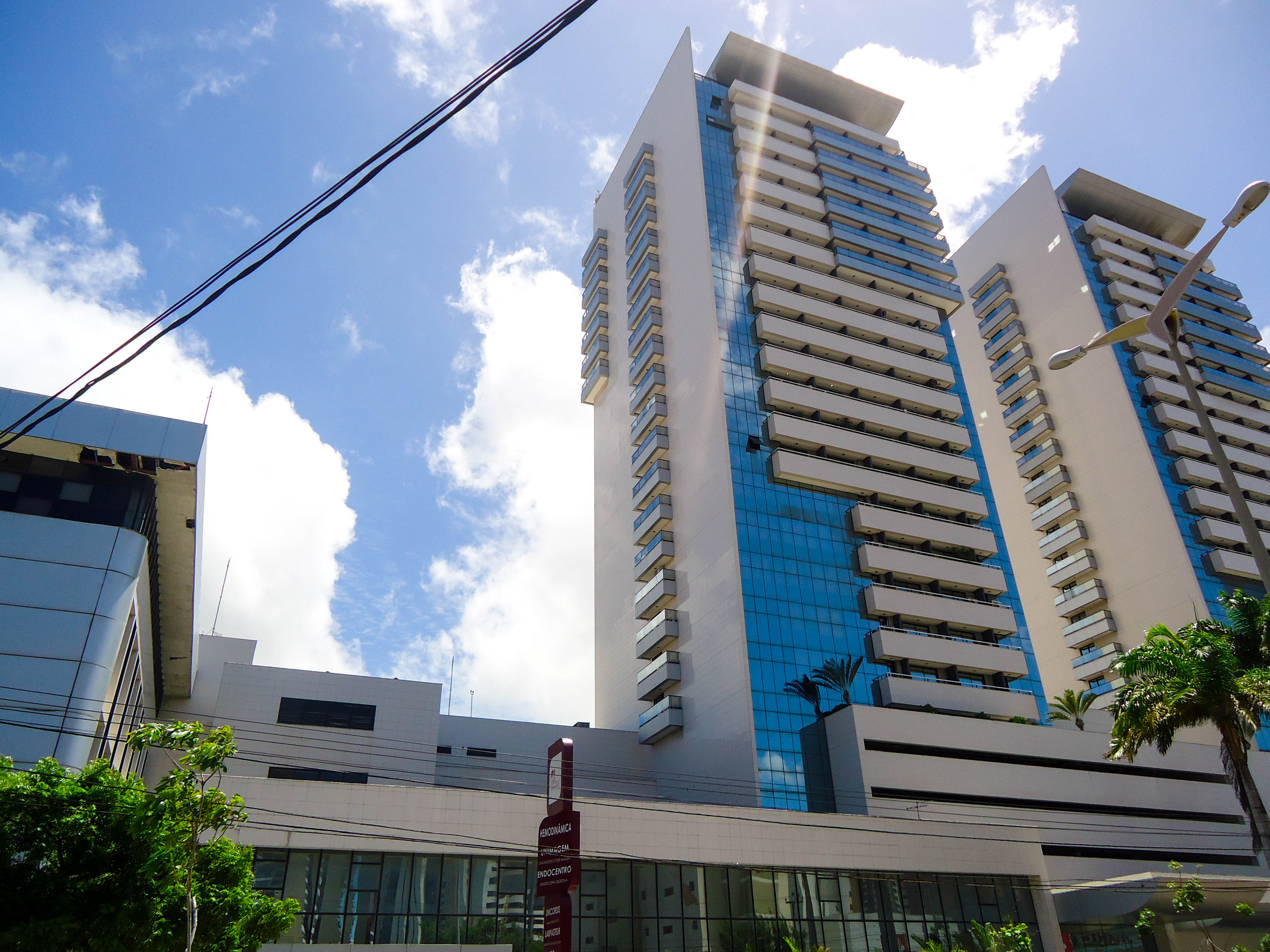
São Mateus Hospital, private institution founded in 1993.

The health indexes of the Fortaleza population are better than the Brazilian average. According to data from 2010, the infant mortality rate up to one year old was 15.8 per 1000 live births in Fortaleza, against a Brazilian average of 16.7. By 2013, 90.6% of children under one year of age had their immunization records up to date. In 2012, 37,577 live births were registered, and the infant mortality rate up to five years of age was 13.2 per 1000. Of the total number of children under two years old weighed by the Family Health Program in 2013, 0.8% were malnourished.

In 2009, Fortaleza had a total of 35 general hospitals, of which 11 were public, 21 were private, two were philanthropic, and one was a trade union. The Doctor José Frota Institute is the largest hospital administered by the Municipal Government, and the General Hospital of Fortaleza is the largest hospital administered by the State Government. In addition, it had 54 specialized hospitals and eight polyclinics. The total number of physicians working in the health network of the municipality was 13,604, approximately 5.4 per thousand inhabitants. Fortaleza has 117 units of health posts, three UPAs administered by the municipality and six administered by the state. The first hospital built in Fortaleza was the Santa Casa de Misericórdia, founded in 1861. Among the most important public health institutions in the city, the most important is the Dr. José Frota Institute, the largest hospital administered by the Municipal Government, and the General Hospital of Fortaleza, the largest hospital administered by the State Government. Among the private institutions, the largest are the Unimed Fortaleza Regional Hospital, Antônio Prudente Hospital, Monte Klinikum Hospital and São Mateus Hospital.

One of the most important basic health programs in Fortaleza is the Family Health Program, within which the city is in third place in the country in extension of coverage, with hundreds of teams distributed in dozens of care units. The Emergency Mobile Care Service (SAMU) is the municipality's health care service, which serves an average of 200 daily occurrences.

The University Hospital Walter Cantídio is the largest liver transplantation facility in the country. The Faculty of Medicine of the UFC is the 13th best medical school in Brazil, 2nd best medical school in the North and Northeast regions and the best medical school in Ceará. UFC's medical degree is still one of the most popular in the country.

== Transportation ==
=== International Airport ===
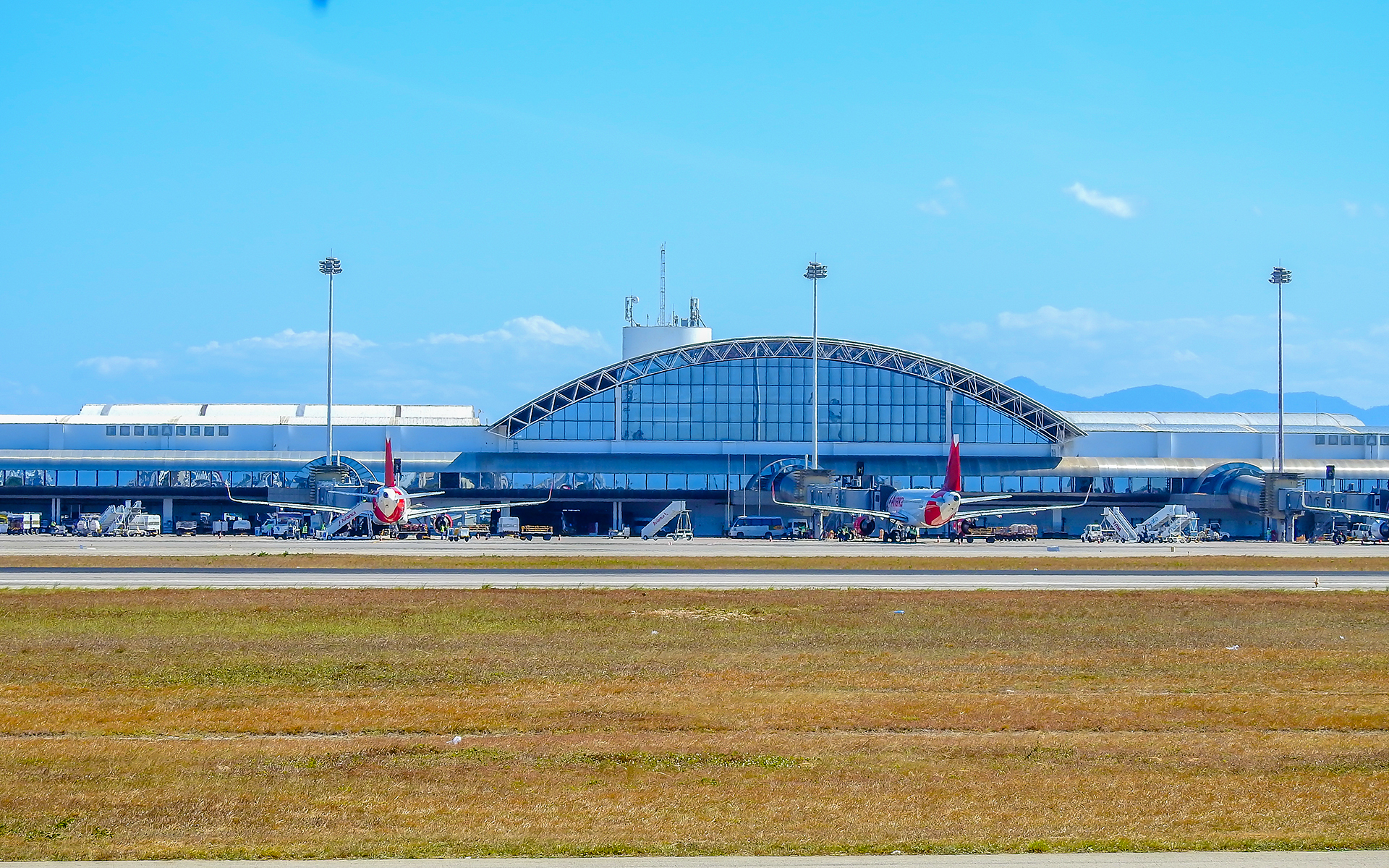
Pinto Martins International Airport (FOR)

The current passenger terminal of Pinto Martins – Fortaleza International Airport, located in the center of Fortaleza, was built between 1996 and 1998. The airport has undergone an expansion process, from which the number of boarding bridges increased from seven to sixteen and the passenger terminal has been expanded from 38,000 m^{2} to 133,000 m^{2}. In 2014, the airport was capable of serving 6.2 million passengers per year, but after the expansion, capacity is at 11.2 million.

Pinto Martins Airport is the third busiest airport in the Northeast Region and one of the busiest in the country, receiving on average 1,500 international aircraft and 65,000 domestic aircraft per year. In 2013, it received more than 5.9 million passengers.

=== Air Force Base ===
Fortaleza Air Force Base - BAFZ, a base of the Brazilian Air Force, is located in Fortaleza.

=== Roads ===
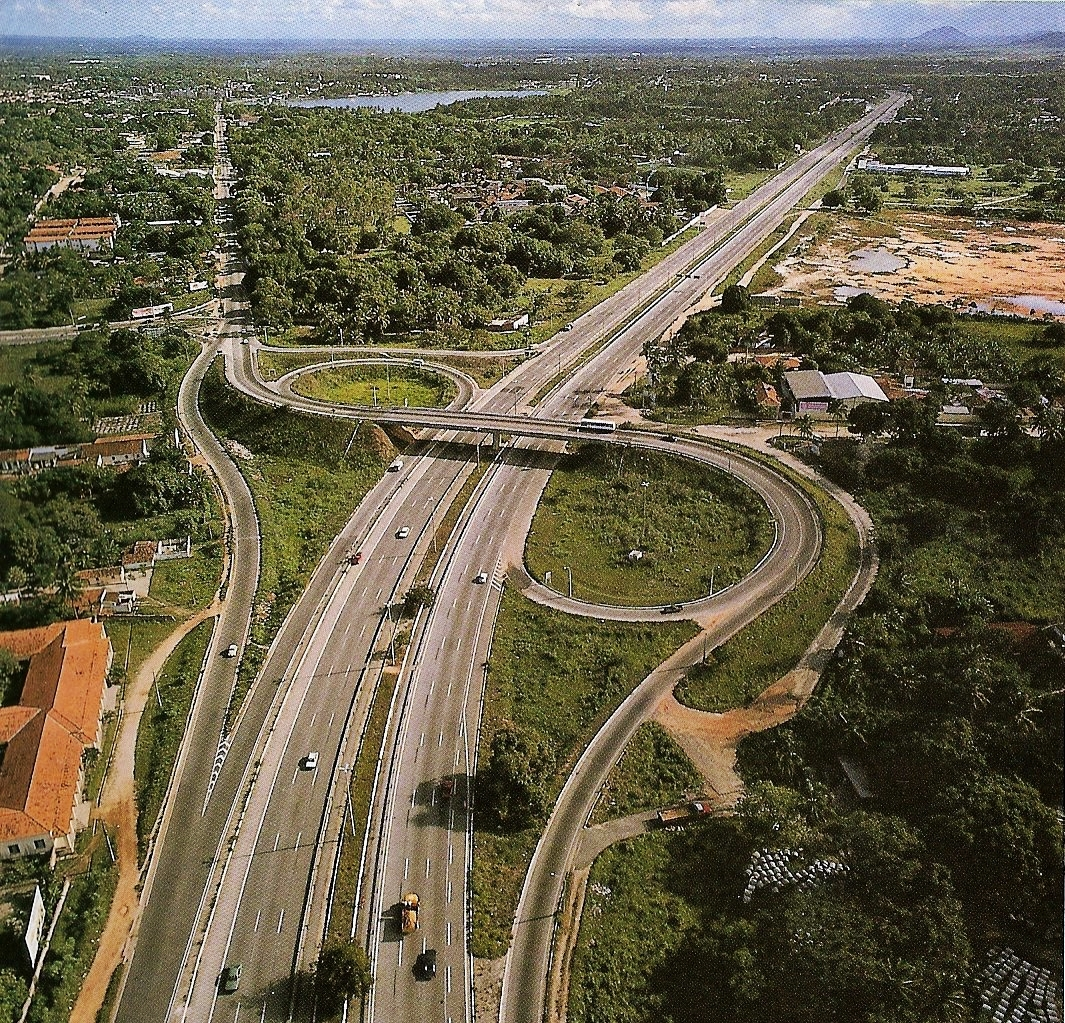
BR-116 in Fortaleza, Ceará, the longest highway in the country, with 4,385 km (2,725 mi) of extension.

In 2013, Fortaleza had 908,074 vehicles, of which 511,109 were cars, and 229,154 motorcycles. Traffic density at peak times in the city is rated as the fourth largest in the country, with 48% of congested roads. The cycle network of Fortaleza is composed of 116.4 km, of which 78.8 km are cycle paths and 37.6 km are cycle paths. The municipality also has a public bicycle system, Bicycletar, which had 40 stations and 400 units in April 2015. In 2015, the municipal taxi fleet was composed of 4,886 vehicles, including common, adapted and special use vehicles.

The city's road transport system is regulated by the Fortaleza Urban Transportation Company (ETUFOR), an agency of the Municipality of Fortaleza. The collective transport carried out by buses is called the Integrated Transportation System (SIT-FOR), and its operation began in 1992.

The system of traffic monitoring is known by the acronym CTAFOR, which stands for "Controle de Tráfego em Área de Fortaleza" (Traffic Control of the Area of Fortaleza).

=== Subway ===
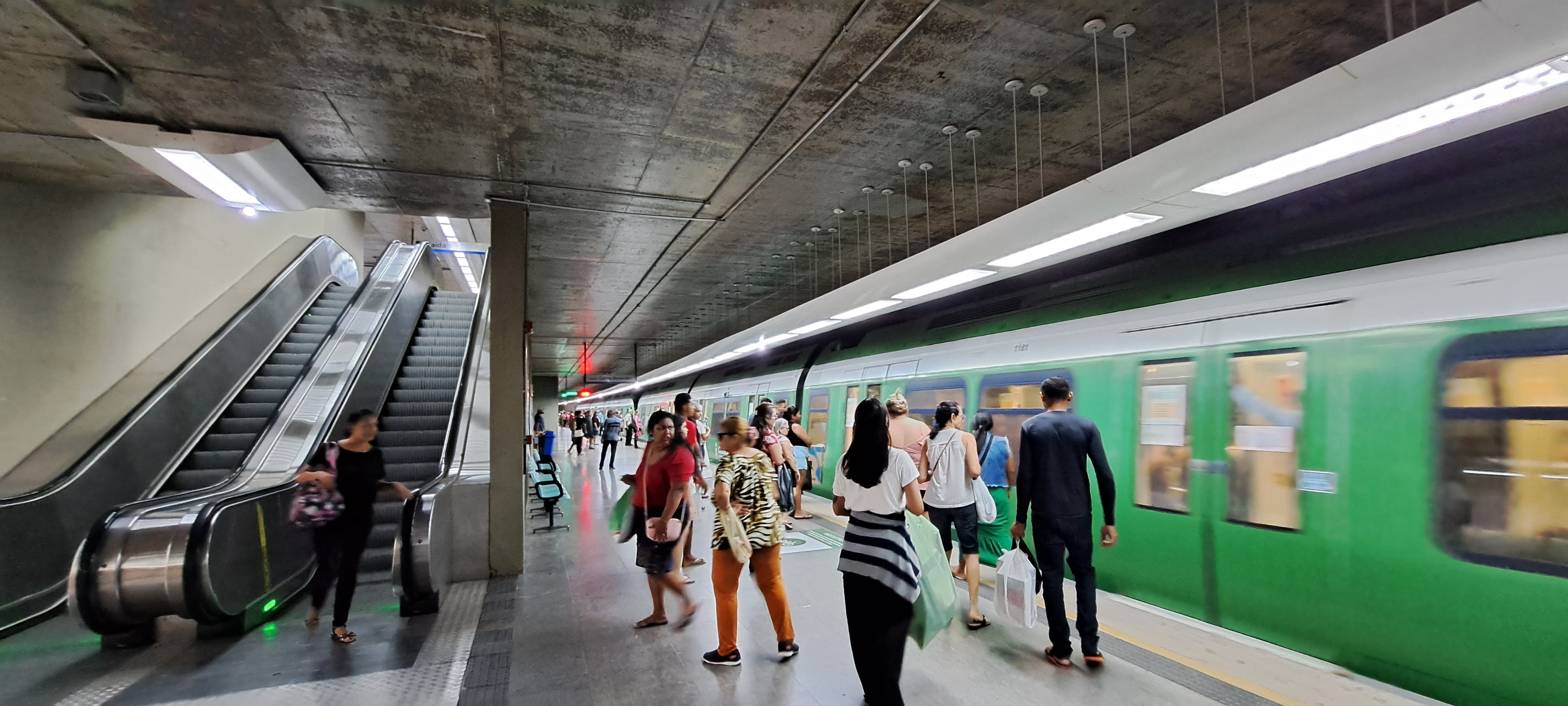
José de Alencar subway station.

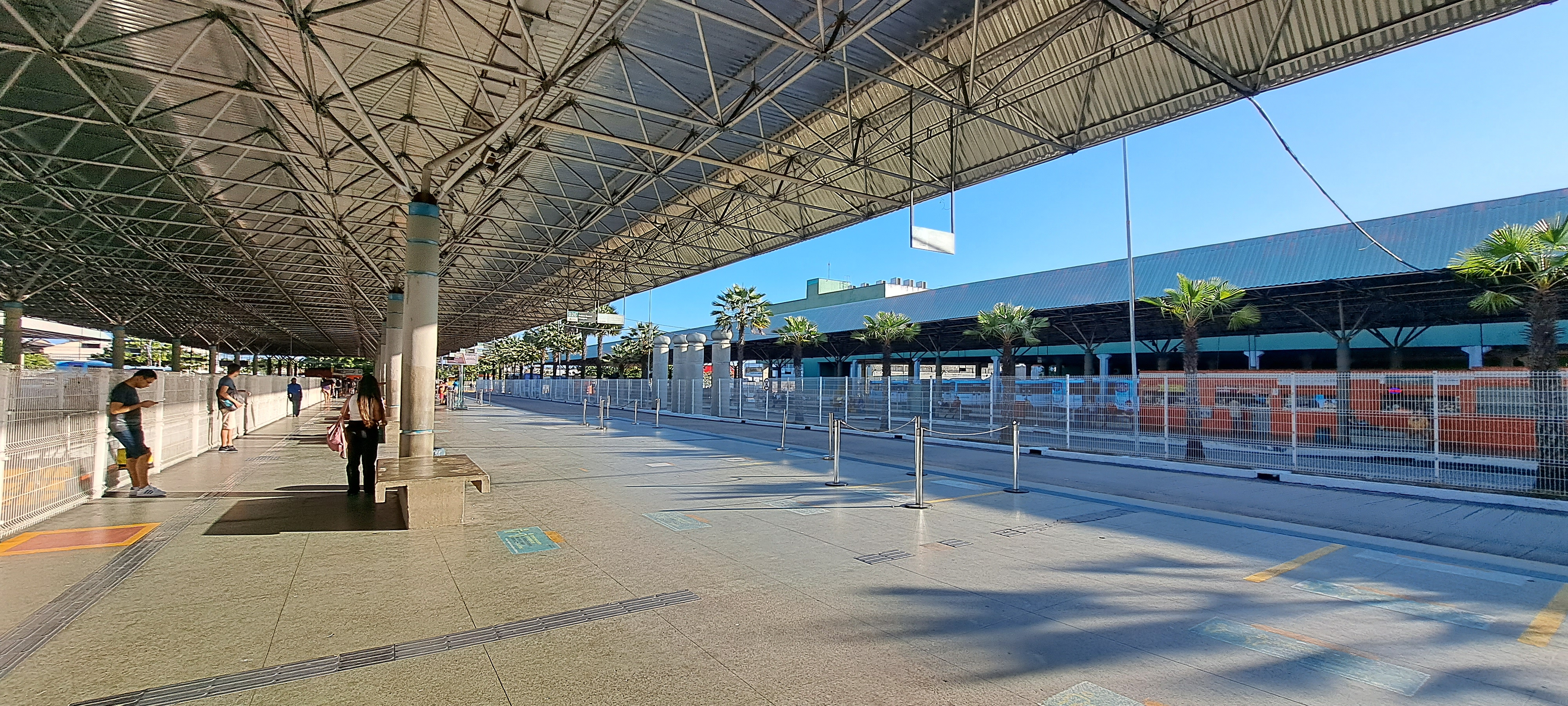
Antonio Bezerra Bus station

The Fortaleza Metro comprises five lines.

The Fortaleza Metro started on October 1, 2014. As of 2014 18 of the 20 stations planned for the South Line are in operation, along with 9 stations of the West Line.

MetroFor is the 43 kilometres (27 mi) rapid transit system for the city of Fortaleza.

=== Bus stations ===
Fortaleza has multiple Bus Rapid Transit, or BRT, lines throughout the city and has plans to extend this network of transportation (BRTBrasil.org)

=== Bike lanes ===
Fortaleza officially has 116.4 kilometres (72.3 mi) of bike lanes.

== Sports ==
The main games of the Ceará State Championship are played in Fortaleza. There are several association football clubs in the city, including Ceará SC, Fortaleza EC, Ferroviário AC, Floresta EC, AE Tiradentes, América FC and Atlético Cearense.

Fortaleza was one of the host cities of the 2013 FIFA Confederations Cup and 2014 FIFA World Cup with matches played at the Arena Castelão. Fortaleza will also host matches at the 2027 FIFA Women's World Cup

Fortaleza is home to the Centro de Formação Olímpica do Nordeste (CFO), which opened in 2014. CFO hosted UFC Fight Night 106 on 11 March 2017.

Water sports such as sailing, windsurfing, kitesurfing, and wakeboarding are also popular in Fortaleza.

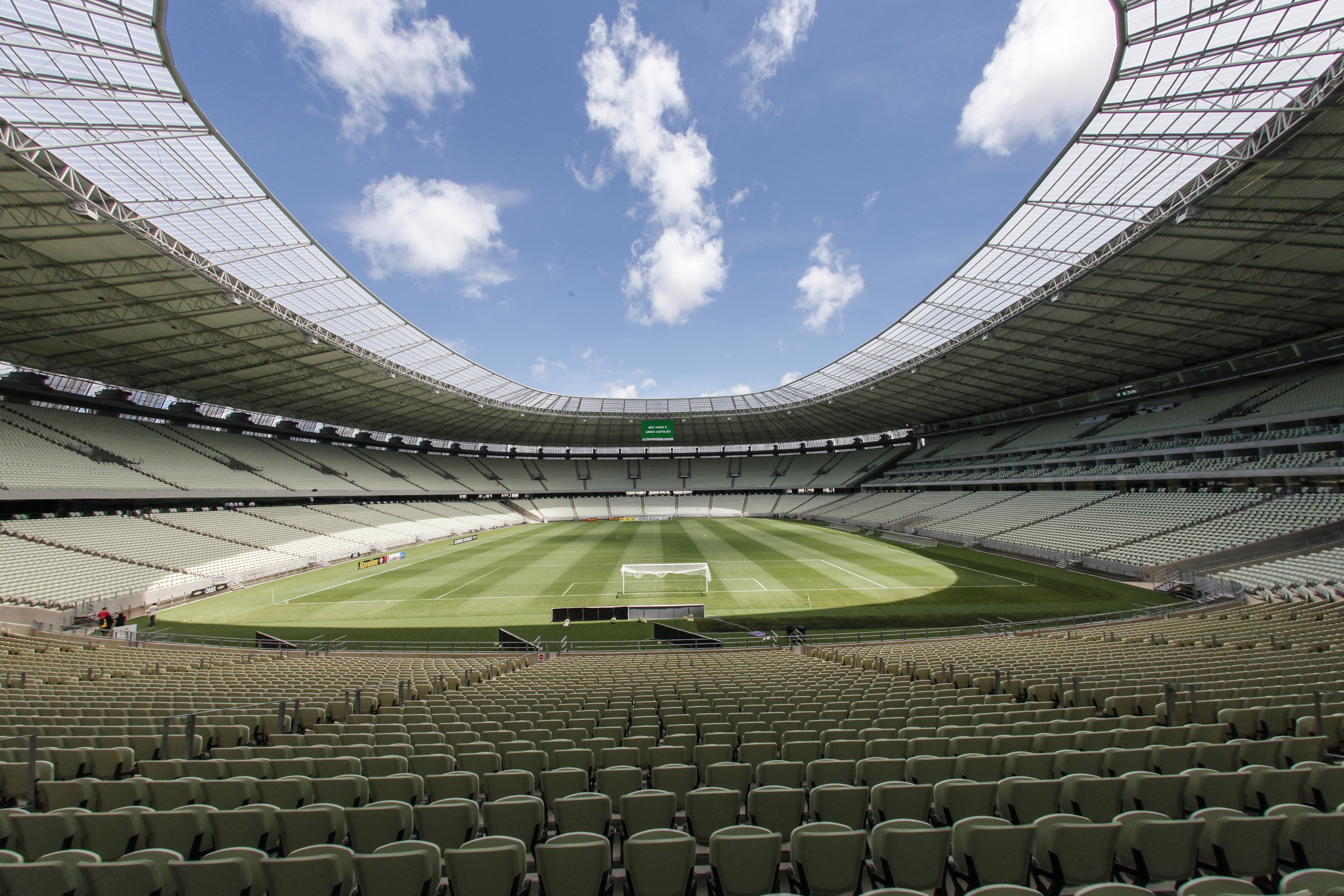
Internal view of Arena Castelão

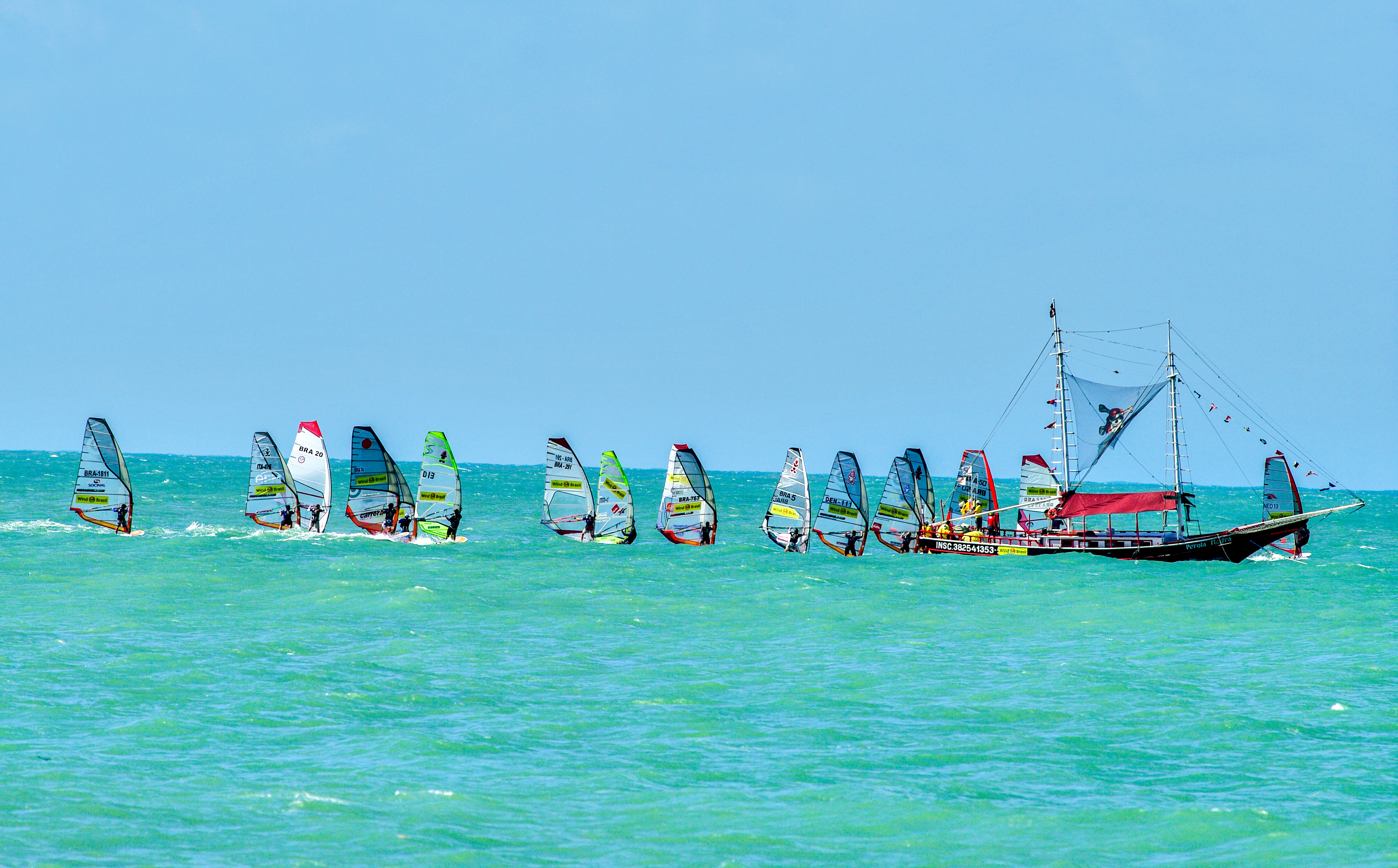
Windsurfing in Fortaleza

== Official subdivision ==
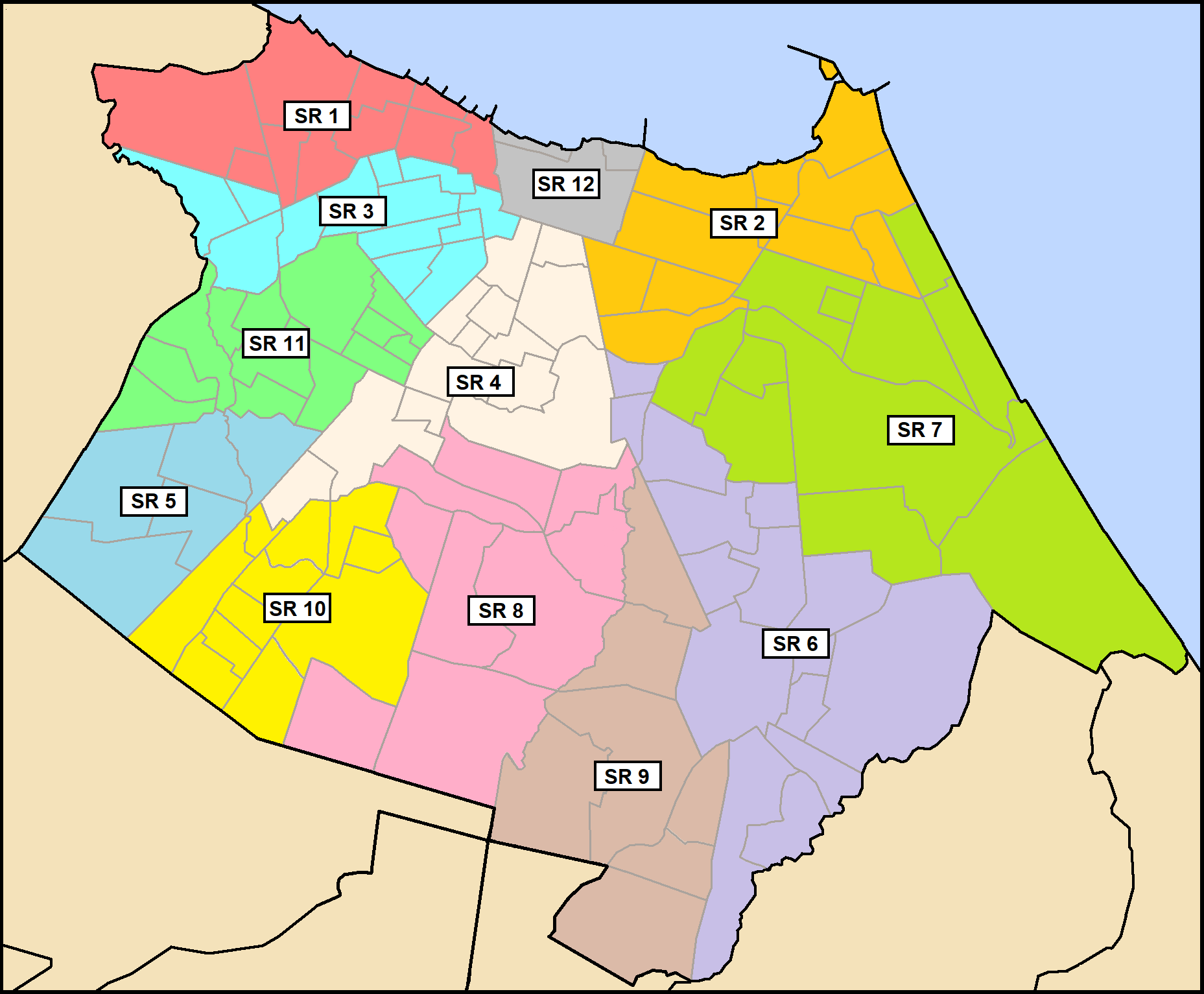
Secretarias Executivas Regionais (Regional Executive Secretariats) of Fortaleza.

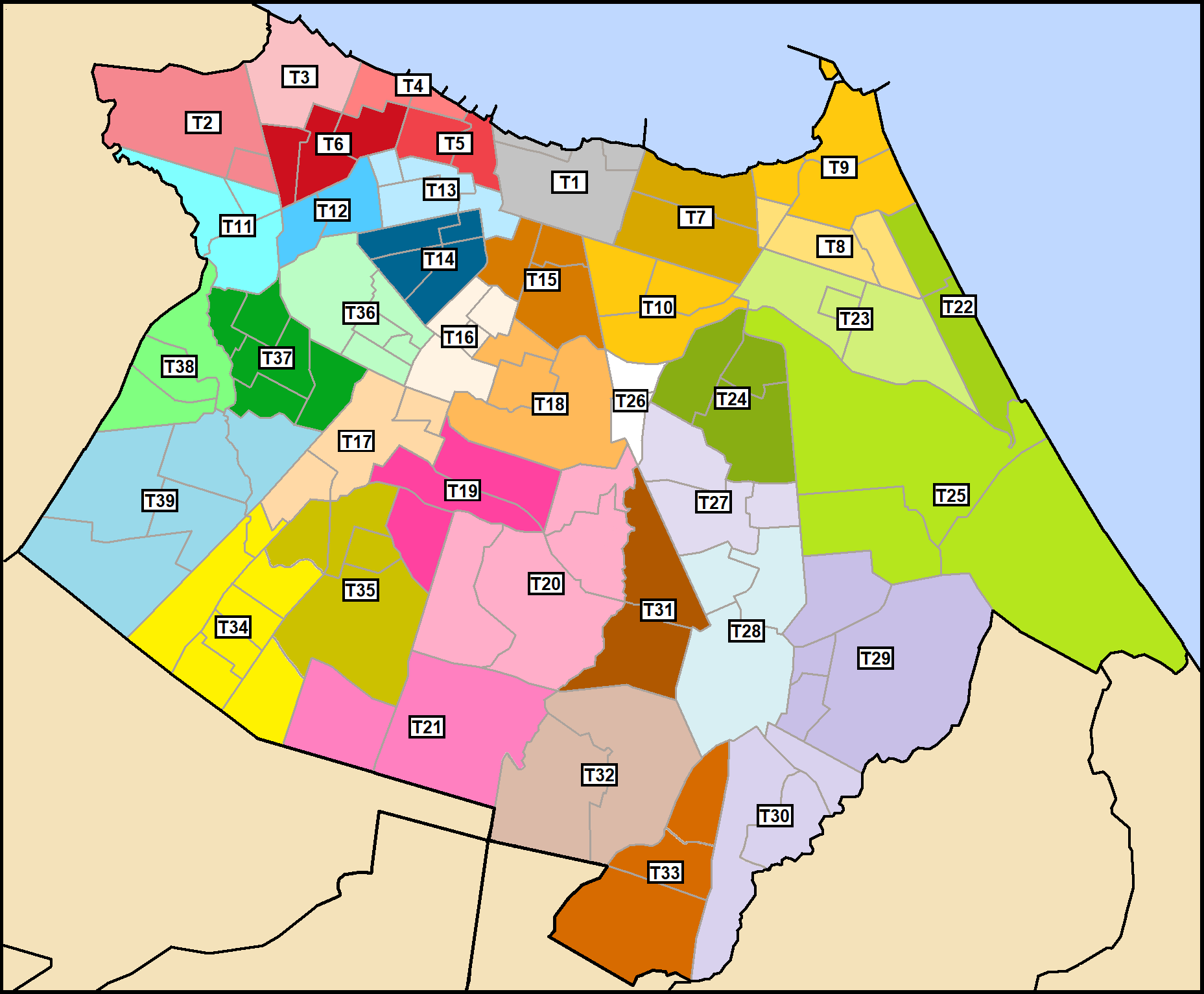
Territórios Administrativos (Administrative Territories) of Fortaleza.

Fortaleza is subdivided in 121 neighborhoods, that are grouped in 39 administrative territories, managed by 12 subprefectures (Secreterias Executivas Regionais). Each subprefecture has a holder appointed by the municipal government.

=== Neighborhoods ===
- Dom Lustosa
- Parangaba
- Pirambu
- Praia de Iracema
- Rodolfo Teófilo

== People ==
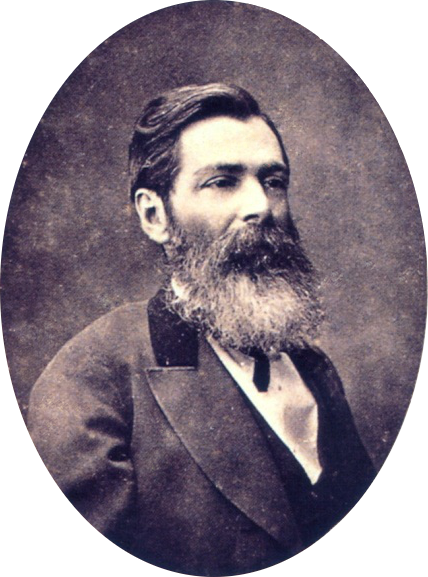
José de Alencar, writer of the Brazilian Empire.

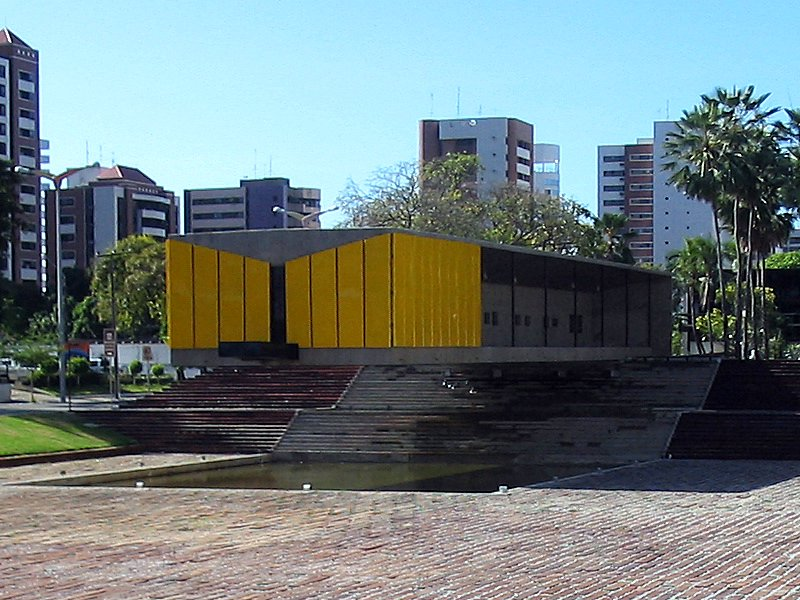
Mausoleum of Marshal Castelo Branco, former dictator of Brazil.

- Neuma Aguiar (1938–2023), Brazilian sociologist who pioneered women's studies in the country
- José de Alencar, famous writer from the 19th century
- Alberto Nepomuceno, famous composer from the 19th century
- Rachel de Queiroz, first female writer in Academia Brasileira de Letras
- André Diamant, international chess grandmaster
- Casimiro Montenegro Filho, founder of the Brazilian Air Force Aeronautical Technologic Institute - ITA
- Maurício Peixoto, mathematician, one of the founders of IMPA
- Gilberto Câmara, former director of Brazil's National Institute for Space Research (INPE)
- Tom Cavalcante, Brazilian actor and comedian
- Castelo Branco, former dictator of Brazil (1964–67)
- Márcio Araújo, Brazilian beach volleyball player, Olympic medallist
- Ed Lincoln, musician and composer
- Thiago Monteiro, table tennis player
- Evanilson, professional footballer
- Raffael, professional footballer
- Ronny Araújo, professional footballer
- Mário Jardel, retired professional footballer
- José Gerardo Moreira Rocha Júnior, footballer
- Otávio Dutra, professional footballer
- Marcus Aurélio, mixed martial arts professional
- Wilson Gouveia, mixed martial arts professional
- Thiago Alves, mixed martial arts professional
- Hermes França, mixed martial arts professional
- Jorge Gurgel, mixed martial arts professional
- Shelda Bede, Brazilian beach volleyball player, Olympic medallist
- Thiago Monteiro, tennis player
- Sávio Santos, professional footballer

== Consular representation ==
Portugal has a Vice-consulate in Fortaleza.

== International relations ==
Fortaleza is twinned with:

- Ferreira do Alentejo, Portugal
- Lisbon, Portugal
- Miami Beach, United States
- Montese, Italy
- Praia, Cape Verde
- Racine, United States
- Sal, Cape Verde

== See also ==
- Housing in Fortaleza, Brazil
