= Galor–Zeira model =

Economic model

The Galor-Zeira model, developed by Oded Galor and Joseph Zeira in 1988, is the first macroeconomic model to examine the influence of economic inequality on macroeconomic dynamics. The model disputes the previously prevalent view, held by the representative agent approach in macroeconomics till the early 1990s, that economic inequality has no effect on macroeconomic activity. It posits that when there are imperfections in capital markets and indivisibilities in investment in the production of human capital (such as education), the distribution of wealth can impact both the long-term per capita income and the process of economic growth. This model was published in the paper “Income Distribution and Macroeconomics”, 1993.

== Thesis ==
In contrast to the Neoclassical paradigm and the representative agent approach that denied the role of inequality in the growth process, novel theories that emerged in the late 1980s and empirical studies of these theories have established that income distribution has a significant impact on the process of development.

The modern perspective, originated by Galor and Zeira (1988, 1993), has underscored the role of heterogeneity in the determination of macroeconomic activity, and has demonstrated that income distribution is an important determinants of the growth process and the evolution of income per capita. In particular, Galor and Zeira have argued that since credit markets are imperfect, inequality has an enduring impact on human capital formation, the level of income per capita, and the growth process.

In contrast to the classical paradigm, which underlined the positive implications of inequality for capital formation and economic growth, Galor and Zeira’s hypothesis suggests that inequality has an adverse effect on human capital formation and economic development, in all but the very poor economies.

The Galor-Zeira model suggests that the impact of inequality on the growth process, is governed by the effect of unequal access to education, due to imperfect capital markets, on human capital formation and economic growth. The initial distribution of income determines whether an economy converges to a low-education, low-income steady-state equilibrium, or high-income, high education steady-state equilibrium. In particular, the model predicts that inequality have an adverse effect on human capital formation and economic growth in all but the very poor economies.

== Testable Predictions ==
The Galor and Zeira’s model predicts that the effect of rising inequality on GDP per capita is negative in relatively rich countries but positive in poor countries. These testable predictions have been examined and confirmed empirically in recent studies. In particular, Brückner and Lederman test the prediction of the model by in the panel of countries during the period 1970-2010, by considering the impact of the interaction between the level of income inequality and the initial level of GDP per capita. In line with the predictions of the model, they find that at the 25th percentile of initial income in the world sample, a 1 percentage point increase in the Gini coefficient increases income per capita by 2.3%, whereas at the 75th percentile of initial income a 1 percentage point increase in the Gini coefficient decreases income per capita by -5.3%. Moreover, the proposed human capital mechanism that mediate the effect of inequality on growth in the Galor-Zeira model is also confirmed. Increases in income inequality increase human capital in poor countries but reduce it in high and middle-income countries.

This recent support for the predictions of the Galor-Zeira model is in line with earlier and recent findings. Roberto Perotti showed that in accordance with the credit market imperfection approach, developed by Galor and Zeira, inequality is associated with lower level of human capital formation (education, experience, apprenticeship) and higher level of fertility, while lower level of human capital is associated with lower levels of economic growth. Roland Benabou's finds that the growth process of Korea and the Philippines "are broadly consistent with the credit-constrained human-capital accumulation hypothesis." In addition, a recent study by Andrew Berg and Jonathan Ostry suggests that inequality seems to affect growth through human capital accumulation and fertility channels.

== Model & Implications ==
=== The Structure of the Model ===
- Aggregate output is produced in two sectors:
1. Skilled-intensive and unskilled-intensive production processes.
2. Skilled (educated) workers are more productive than unskilled (uneducated) workers.
- Individuals:
1. Live two periods.
2. Identical in abilities and preferences.
3. Differ in parental wealth.
- Individuals’ occupational choices:
1. First period of life: invest in human capital or work as an unskilled worker.
2. Second period of life: work as skilled or unskilled worker (based on decision in the first period).
- Imperfect capital markets: Interest for borrowers is higher than that for lenders (due to monitoring cost).
- Fixed cost associated with investment in education, reflecting:
1. Indivisibility of academic degrees.
2. Differential return to college graduate vs college dropout.

=== Short-run Implications ===
Decision to invest in education depends on parent wealth due to credit market imperfections.

- High parental transfer relative to the cost of education reduces the cost of borrowing for education and induces individuals to invest in human capital.
- Low parental transfer relative to the cost of education increases the cost of borrowing for education and dissuades individuals from investing in human capital.

=== Long-run Implications ===
The society is segmented into two dynasties (due to the fixed cost of education):

- Skilled (educated) dynasty in which individuals transfer sufficient resources from generation to generation so as to justify investment in human capital.
- Unskilled (uneducated) dynasty in which individuals do not transfer sufficient resources from generation to generation so as to justify investment in human capital.

Inequality affects development:

- In non-poor economies, inequality traps a larger fraction of society in under-investment in human capital and therefore reduces income per capita and economic growth.
- In poor economies, inequality permits at least some individuals to invest in human capital (since the average level of income is low relative to the cost of education) and is therefore conducive for growth.

=== Policy implications ===
Government policy can improve the long-run equilibrium (in non-poor economy) by:

- Subsidizing tuition cost.
- Subsidizing student loans.
- Improving financial markets (reducing the gap between the interest rate for borrowers and lenders).

== Significance ==
The Review of Economic Studies named the Galor-Zeira paper ("Income Distribution and Macroeconomics") among the 11 most path-breaking papers published in The Review of Economic Studies in the past 60 years.

== See also ==
- Income distribution
- Capital market imperfections
- Economic growth
- Economic inequality
