= Aggregate =

Aggregate or aggregates may refer to:

== Computing and mathematics ==
- Aggregate (data warehouse), a part of the dimensional model that is used to speed up query time by summarizing tables
- Aggregate analysis, a technique used in amortized analysis in computer science, especially in analysis of algorithms
- Aggregate class, a type of class supported by C++
- Aggregate data, in statistics, data combined from several measurements
- Aggregate function, aggregation function, in database management is a function wherein the values of multiple rows are grouped together to form a single summary value
- Aggregate Level Simulation Protocol (ALSP), a protocol and supporting software that enables simulations to interoperate with one another
- Aggregate root, a concept in the Domain-driven Design software development process
- Aggregate throughput, total throughput measured over all links and in all directions in a communication network
- Aggregate data type, a data type containing multiple elements. The elements may be homogeneous, as in the case of an array, or heterogeneous, in the case of a struct.

== Economics ==
- Aggregate demand, the total demand for final goods and services during a specific time period in an economy
- Aggregate income, the total of all incomes in an economy without adjustments for inflation, taxation, or types of double counting
- Aggregate Spend (US), a process to monitor the total amount spent by healthcare manufacturers on individual healthcare professionals and organizations through payments and gifts of various kinds
- Aggregate supply, the total supply of goods and services produced during a specific time period in an economy

== Religion ==
- Aggregate (Sanskrit, skandha; Pāli, khandha), in Buddhism, a category of sensory experiences
- Aggregates, in some Christian churches, are combinations of groupings of multiples of canonical hours (i.e., offices) that form a single religious service

== Science ==
=== Biology ===
- Aggregate fruit, in botanical terminology, fruit that develops from the merging of ovaries originating from a single flower
- Aggregate species (Wiktionary) or species aggregate, a named species representing a range of very closely related organisms; see also species complex

=== Materials science ===
- Aggregate (composite), in materials science, a component of a composite material that resists compressive stress
- Construction aggregate, materials used in construction, including sand, gravel, crushed stone, slag, or recycled crushed concrete

=== Other uses in science ===
- Aggregate (geology), a mass of crystals, rock particles, or soil particles
- Aggregate (rocket family), in rocketry, a set of experimental rocket designs developed in Nazi Germany

== Arts, entertainment, and media ==
- Aggregate, in music, is a set of all twelve pitch classes, also known as the total chromatic
- The Aggregate, a 1988 album by Anthony Braxton and the Rova saxophone Quartet

== Other uses ==
- Aggregate, in the social sciences, a gathering of people into a cluster or a crowd that does not form a true social group
- Aggregate Industries, a manufacturer of aggregate materials
- Aggregate score, in sport, is the sum of two scorelines in a two-legged match

== See also ==
- Aggregates, West Virginia
- Aggregation (disambiguation)
- Aggregator (disambiguation)
