= Macrohistory =

Long-term trends in world history

Macrohistory seeks out large, long-term trends in world history in search of ultimate patterns by a comparison of proximate details. It favors a comparative or world-historical perspective to determine the roots of changes as well as the developmental paths of society or a historical process.

A macrohistorical study might examine Japanese feudalism and European feudalism to decide whether feudal structures are an inevitable outcome because of certain conditions. Macrohistorical studies often "assume that macro-historical processes repeat themselves in explainable and understandable ways." The approach can identify stages in the development of humanity as a whole such as the large-scale direction towards greater rationality, greater liberty or the development of productive forces and communist society, among others.

== Description ==
Macrohistory is distinguished from microhistory, which involves the rigorous and in-depth study of a single event in history. However, these two can be combined such as the case of studying the larger trends of post-slavery societies, which include the examination of individual cases and smaller groups. Macrohistory is also distinguished from metahistory with the way the latter recognizes historical works as "a verbal structure in the form of a narrative prose discourse." According to Garry Trompf, macrohistory encompasses but is not limited by metahistory by taking in broad prospectus of change, including those that are imaginal or speculative.

Macrohistory has four "idea frames" – that past events can show: 1) we are progressing; 2) affairs have worsened; 3) everything is repetitive; and, 4) nothing can be understood without an eschaton (end time) or apocatastasis (restoration of all things, or reconstitution).

== Examples ==
Examples of macrohistorical analysis include Oswald Spengler's assertion that the lifespan of civilizations is limited and ultimately they decay. There is also Arnold J. Toynbee's historical synthesis in explaining the rise and fall of civilizations, which also included those by other historians (e.g. William H. McNeill's The Rise of the West) inspired by his works. The Battle of Ain Jalut and the early Mongol conquests are considered by many historians to be of great macrohistorical importance. The former marked the high water point of Mongol conquests, and the first time they had ever been decisively defeated. The early conquests, on the other hand, were pursued for the purpose of long-distance trade but disrupted trade networks until the emergence of the so-called Pax Mongolica when trade relations in Eurasia stabilized.

== Reception ==
According to economists Robert Solow, Brian Snowdon, Jason Collins, and to an article in the "Break Through & Mind Changing Idea" section of Wired (Japan), Oded Galor's unified growth theory is a macro-historical analysis that has significantly contributed to the understanding of process of development over the entire course of human history and the role of deep-rooted factors in the transition from stagnation to growth and in the emergence of the vast inequality across the globe. Wired (Japan) has described Galor's theory as a global theory comparable to Newton's "law of gravitation", Darwin's "evolution theory" or Einstein's "general relativity".

== Macrohistorical publications ==
- Creasy, Edward Shepherd (1851). The Fifteen Decisive Battles of the World.
- Spengler, Oswald (1918). The Decline of the West.
- Quigley, Carroll (1961). The Evolution of Civilizations.
- McNeill, William H. (1976). Plagues and People.
- Roberts, J. M. (1976). History of the World. (2013 edition co-authored by Odd Arne Westad)
- Rindos, David (1984). Origins of Agriculture: an Evolutionary Perspective.
- Huang, Ray (1993). China: A Macro History.
- Diamond, Jared (1997). Guns, Germs, and Steel: The Fates of Human Societies.
- Roberts, Neil (1998). The Holocene: An Environmental History.
- McNeill, J.R.; McNeill, William H. (2003). The Human Web: A Bird's-Eye View of World History. W. W. Norton & Company. ISBN 9780393051797.
- Christian, David G. (2005). "Macrohistory: The Play of Scales" (PDF). Social Evolution & History. 4 (1): 22–59.
- Galor, Oded (2011). Unified Growth Theory.
- Harari, Yuval Noah (2014). Sapiens: A Brief History of Humankind.

== See also ==
- Big History – Education strategy or academic discipline
- Cliodynamics – Mathematical modeling of historical processes
- Cliometrics – Application of econometrics and other formal methods to the study of history
- Longue durée – Concept in history
- Microhistory – Intensive historical investigation of a well-defined smaller unit of research
- Universal history (genre) – History of humanity as a whole unit
- History
