= Economic growth =

Measure of increase in market value of goods

Historic world GDP per capita

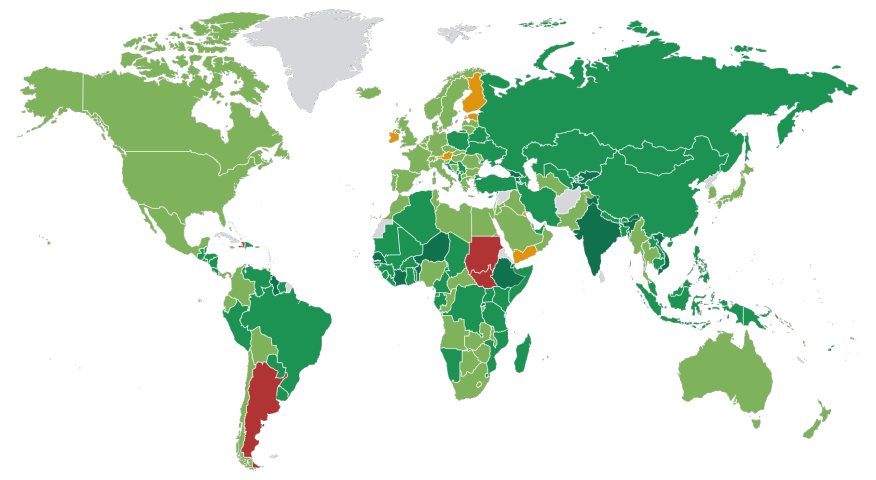
Countries by real GDP growth rate in % for 2024 (IMF WEO database): below −2.7 −2.7 to −0.2 −0.2 to 2.9 / 3.0 to 5.9 above 5.9 no data

Real GDP per capita growth in % for 2025: Below -3 -3 to -2 -2 to -1 -1 to 0 0 to 1 / 1 to 2 2 to 3 3 to 4 4 to 5 above 5 No data

In economics, economic growth is an increase in the quantity and quality of the economic goods and services that a society produces. It can be measured as the increase in the inflation-adjusted output of an economy in a given year or over a period of time. It focuses on the economic activities of a country.

The rate of growth is typically calculated as real gross domestic product (GDP) growth rate, real GDP per capita growth rate, GNI per capita growth or median income growth. The "rate" of economic growth refers to the geometric annual rate of growth in GDP or GDP per capita between the first and the last year over a period of time. This growth rate represents the trend in the average level of GDP over the period, and ignores any fluctuations in the GDP around this trend. Growth is usually calculated in "real" value, which is inflation-adjusted, to eliminate the distorting effect of inflation on the prices of goods produced. GDP per capita is the GDP of the entire country divided by the number of people in the country. Measurement of economic growth uses national income accounting.

Economists refer to economic growth caused by more efficient use of inputs (increased productivity of labor, of physical capital, of energy or of materials) as intensive growth. In contrast, economic growth caused only by increases in the amount of inputs available for use (increased population, for example, or new territory) counts as extensive growth. Innovation also generates economic growth. In the U.S. about 60% of consumer spending in 2013 went on goods and services that did not exist in 1869.

== Determinants of economic growth ==
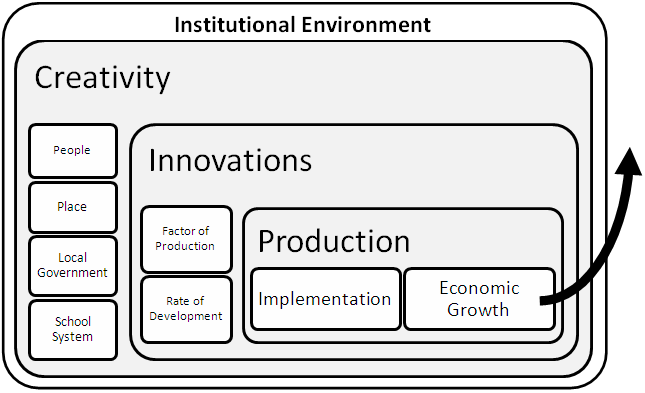
The system of economic growth in developed regions

In national income accounting, per capita output can be calculated using the following factors: output per unit of labor input (labor productivity), hours worked (intensity), the percentage of the working-age population actually working (participation rate) and the proportion of the working-age population to the total population (demographics). "The rate of change of GDP/population is the sum of the rates of change of these four variables plus their cross products."

Short-term economic changes happen around long-term changes, though they are unpredictable. Recessions may occur, causing GDP to fall, along with productivity, causing unemployment to rise.

=== Productivity ===
Increases in labor productivity (the ratio of the value of output to labor input) have historically been the most important source of real per capita economic growth. In a famous estimate, MIT Professor Robert Solow concluded that technological progress has accounted for 80 percent of the long-term rise in U.S. per capita income, with increased investment in capital explaining only the remaining 20 percent.

Increases in productivity lower the real cost of goods. Over the 20th century, the real price of many goods fell by over 90%.

Economic growth has traditionally been attributed to the accumulation of human and physical capital and the increase in productivity and creation of new goods arising from technological innovation. Further division of labour (specialization) is also fundamental to rising productivity.

Before industrialization, technological progress resulted in an increase in the population, which was kept in check by food supply and other resources, which acted to limit per capita income, a condition known as the Malthusian trap. The rapid economic growth that occurred during the Industrial Revolution was remarkable because it was in excess of population growth, providing an escape from the Malthusian trap. Countries that industrialized eventually saw their population growth slow down, a phenomenon known as the demographic transition.

Increases in productivity are the major factor responsible for per capita economic growth—this has been especially evident since the mid-19th century. Most of the economic growth in the 20th century was due to increased output per unit of labor, materials, energy, and land (less input per widget). The balance of the growth in output has come from using more inputs. Both of these changes increase output. The increased output included more of the same goods produced previously and new goods and services.

During the Industrial Revolution, mechanization began to replace hand methods in manufacturing, and new processes streamlined production of chemicals, iron, steel, and other products. Machine tools made the economical production of metal parts possible, so that parts could be interchangeable. (See: Interchangeable parts.)

During the Second Industrial Revolution, a major factor of productivity growth was the substitution of inanimate power for human and animal labor. Also there was a great increase in power as steam-powered electricity generation and internal combustion supplanted limited wind and water power. Since that replacement, the great expansion of total power was driven by continuous improvements in energy conversion efficiency. Other major historical sources of productivity were automation, transportation infrastructures (canals, railroads, and highways), new materials (steel) and power, which includes steam and internal combustion engines and electricity. Other productivity improvements included mechanized agriculture and scientific agriculture including chemical fertilizers and livestock and poultry management, and the Green Revolution. Interchangeable parts made with machine tools powered by electric motors evolved into mass production, which is universally used today.

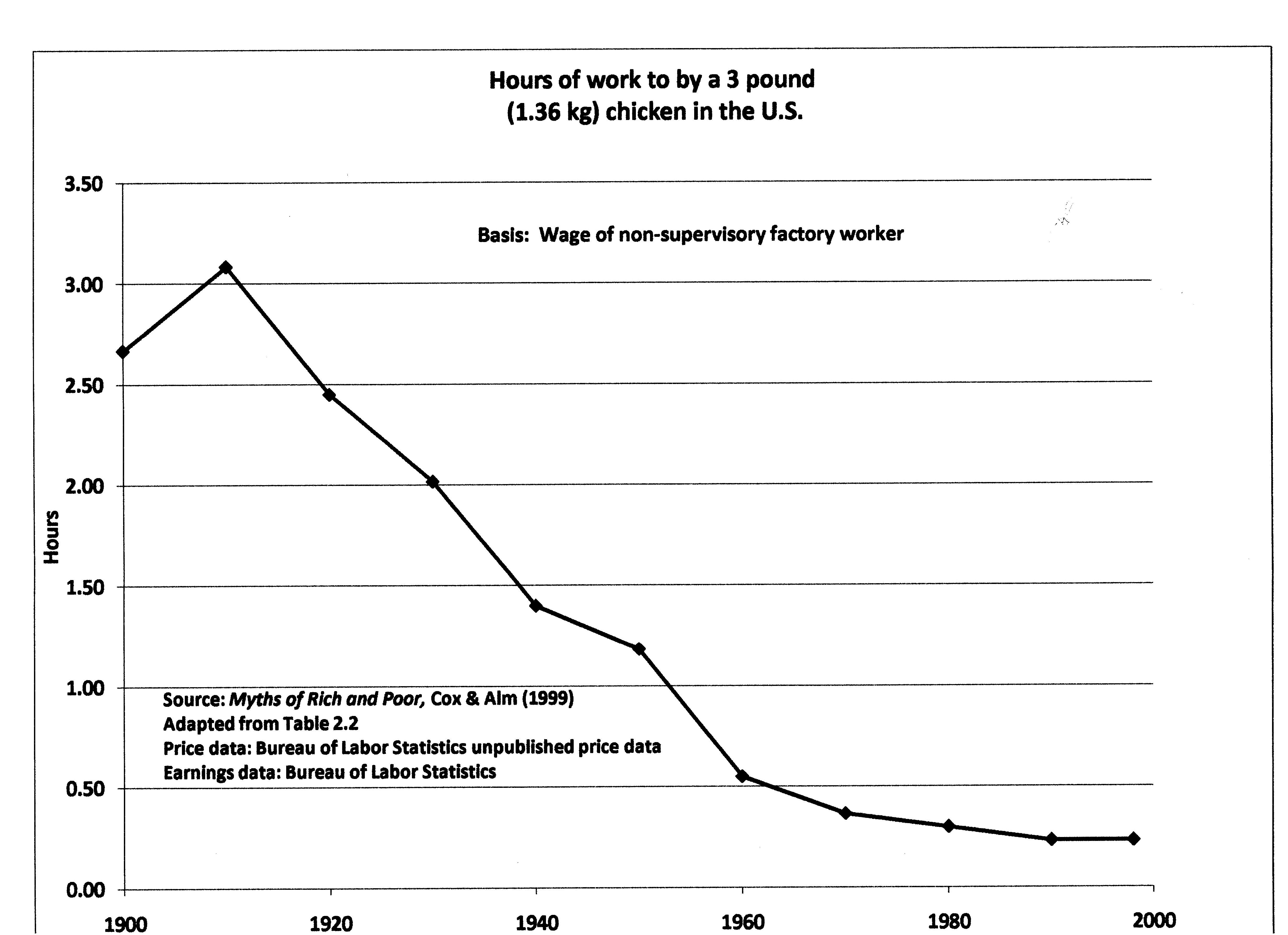
Productivity lowered the cost of most items in terms of work time required to purchase. Real food prices fell due to improvements in transportation and trade, mechanized agriculture, fertilizers, scientific farming and the Green Revolution.

Great sources of productivity improvement in the late 19th century were railroads, steam ships, horse-pulled reapers and combine harvesters, and steam-powered factories. The invention of processes for making cheap steel were important for many forms of mechanization and transportation. By the late 19th century both prices and weekly work hours fell because less labor, materials, and energy were required to produce and transport goods. However, real wages rose, allowing workers to improve their diet, buy consumer goods and afford better housing.

Mass production of the 1920s created overproduction, which was arguably one of several causes of the Great Depression of the 1930s. Following the Great Depression, economic growth resumed, aided in part by increased demand for existing goods and services, such as automobiles, telephones, radios, electricity and household appliances. New goods and services included television, air conditioning and commercial aviation (after 1950), creating enough new demand to stabilize the work week. The building of highway infrastructures also contributed to post-World War II growth, as did capital investments in manufacturing and chemical industries. The post-World War II economy also benefited from the discovery of vast amounts of oil around the world, particularly in the Middle East. By John W. Kendrick's estimate, three-quarters of increase in U.S. per capita GDP from 1889 to 1957 was due to increased productivity.

Economic growth in the United States slowed down after 1973. In contrast, growth in Asia has been strong since then, starting with Japan and spreading to Four Asian Tigers, China, Southeast Asia, the Indian subcontinent and Asia Pacific. In 1957 South Korea had a lower per capita GDP than Ghana, and by 2008 it was 17 times as high as Ghana's. The Japanese economic growth has slackened considerably since the late 1980s.

Productivity in the United States grew at an increasing rate throughout the 19th century and was most rapid in the early to middle decades of the 20th century. U.S. productivity growth spiked towards the end of the century in 1996–2004, due to an acceleration in the rate of technological innovation known as Moore's law. After 2004 U.S. productivity growth returned to the low levels of 1972–96.

=== Factor accumulation ===
Capital in economics ordinarily refers to physical capital, which consists of structures (largest component of physical capital) and equipment used in business (machinery, factory equipment, computers and office equipment, construction equipment, business vehicles, medical equipment, etc.). Up to a point increases in the amount of capital per worker are an important cause of economic output growth. Capital is subject to diminishing returns because of the amount that can be effectively invested and because of the growing burden of depreciation. In the development of economic theory, the distribution of income was considered to be between labor and the owners of land and capital. In recent decades there have been several Asian countries with high rates of economic growth driven by capital investment.

The work week declined considerably over the 19th century. By the 1920s the average work week in the U.S. was 49 hours, but the work week was reduced to 40 hours (after which overtime premium was applied) as part of the National Industrial Recovery Act of 1933.

Demographic factors may influence growth by changing the employment to population ratio and the labor force participation rate. Industrialization creates a demographic transition in which birth rates decline and the average age of the population increases.

Women with fewer children and better access to market employment tend to join the labor force in higher percentages. There is a reduced demand for child labor and children spend more years in school. The increase in the percentage of women in the labor force in the U.S. contributed to economic growth, as did the entrance of the baby boomers into the workforce.

=== Conventional growth domain ===
It has been observed that GDP growth is influenced by the size of the economy. The relation between GDP growth and GDP across the countries at a particular point of time is convex. Growth increases as GDP reaches its maximum and then begins to decline. There exists some extremum value. This is not exactly middle-income trap. It is observed for both developed and developing economies. Actually, countries having this property belong to conventional growth domain. However, the extremum could be extended by technological and policy innovations and some countries move into innovative growth domain with higher limiting values.

=== Human capital ===
Many theoretical and empirical analyses of economic growth attribute a major role to a country's level of human capital, defined as the skills of the population or the work force. Human capital has been included in both neoclassical and endogenous growth models.

A country's level of human capital is difficult to measure since it is created at home, at school, and on the job. Economists have attempted to measure human capital using numerous proxies, including the population's level of literacy, its level of numeracy, its level of book production/capita, its average level of formal schooling, its average test score on international tests, and its cumulative depreciated investment in formal schooling. The most commonly used measure of human capital is the level (average years) of school attainment in a country, building upon the data development of Robert Barro and Jong-Wha Lee. This measure is widely used because Barro and Lee provide data for numerous countries in five-year intervals for a long period of time.

One problem with the schooling attainment measure is that the amount of human capital acquired in a year of schooling is not the same at all levels of schooling and is not the same in all countries. This measure also presumes that human capital is only developed in formal schooling, contrary to the extensive evidence that families, neighborhoods, peers, and health also contribute to the development of human capital. Despite these potential limitations, Theodore Breton has shown that this measure can represent human capital in log-linear growth models because across countries GDP/adult has a log-linear relationship to average years of schooling, which is consistent with the log-linear relationship between workers' personal incomes and years of schooling in the Mincer model.

Eric Hanushek and Dennis Kimko introduced measures of students' mathematics and science skills from international assessments into growth analysis. They found that this measure of human capital was very significantly related to economic growth. Eric Hanushek and Ludger Wößmann have extended this analysis. Theodore Breton shows that the correlation between economic growth and students' average test scores in Hanushek and Wößmann's analyses is actually due to the relationship in countries with less than eight years of schooling. He shows that economic growth is not correlated with average scores in more educated countries. Hanushek and Wößmann further investigate whether the relationship of knowledge capital to economic growth is causal. They show that the level of students' cognitive skills can explain the slow growth in Latin America and the rapid growth in East Asia.

Joerg Baten and Jan Luiten van Zanden employ book production per capita as a proxy for sophisticated literacy capabilities and find that "Countries with high levels of human capital formation in the 18th century initiated or participated in the industrialization process of the 19th century, whereas countries with low levels of human capital formation were unable to do so, among them many of today's Less Developed Countries such as India, Indonesia, and China."

=== Health ===
Amartya Sen and Martha Nussbaum's capability approach defines human welfare as an individual's ability to achieve things like economic success. Thus health in a broader sense can be defined as not just the absence of illness, but the opportunity for people to live a full life and develop their full economic potential. It is argued that human capital is an important asset for economic growth, but can only be so if a population is healthy and well-nourished. One of the most important metrics of health is the mortality rate and how its rise or decline can affect the labour supply predominant in a developing economy. Mortality decline triggers greater investments in individual human capital and an increase in economic growth. Matteo Cervellati, Uwe Sunde and Rodrigo.R Soares have considered frameworks in which mortality decline has an influence on parents to have fewer children and to provide quality education for those children, as a result instituting an economic-demographic transition.

The relationship between health and economic growth is further nuanced by distinguishing the influence of specific diseases on GDP per capita from that of aggregate measures of health, such as life expectancy. Thus, investing in health is warranted both from growth and equity perspectives, given the important role played by health in the economy. Protecting health assets from the impact of systemic transitional costs on economic reforms, pandemics, economic crises and natural disasters is also crucial. Protection from the shocks produced by illness and death are usually taken care of within a country's social insurance system. In areas such as Sub-Saharan Africa, the prevalence of HIV and AIDS has a comparative negative impact on economical development. Ultimately, when people live longer on average, human capital expenditures are more likely to pay off, and all of these mechanisms center around the complementarity of longevity, health, and education, for which there is ample empirical evidence.

=== Political institutions ===
"As institutions influence behavior and incentives in real life, they forge the success or failure of nations."

In economics and economic history, the transition from earlier economic systems to capitalism was facilitated by the adoption of government policies which fostered commerce and gave individuals more personal and economic freedom. These included new laws favorable to the establishment of business, including contract law, laws providing for the protection of private property, and the abolishment of anti-usury laws.

Much of the literature on economic growth refers to the success story of the British state after the Glorious Revolution of 1688, in which high fiscal capacity combined with constraints on the power of the king generated some respect for the rule of law. However, others have questioned that this institutional formula is not so easily replicable elsewhere as a change in the Constitution—and the type of institutions created by that change—does not necessarily create a change in political power if the economic powers of that society are not aligned with the new set of rule of law institutions. In England, a dramatic increase in the state's fiscal capacity followed the creation of constraints on the crown, but elsewhere in Europe increases in state capacity happened before major rule of law reforms.

There are many different ways through which states achieved state (fiscal) capacity and this different capacity accelerated or hindered their economic development. Thanks to the underlying homogeneity of its land and people, England was able to achieve a unified legal and fiscal system since the Middle Ages that enabled it to substantially increase the taxes it raised after 1689. On the other hand, the French experience of state building faced much stronger resistance from local feudal powers keeping it legally and fiscally fragmented until the French Revolution despite significant increases in state capacity during the seventeenth century. Furthermore, Prussia and the Habsburg empire—much more heterogeneous states than England—were able to increase state capacity during the eighteenth century without constraining the powers of the executive. Nevertheless, it is unlikely that a country will generate institutions that respect property rights and the rule of law without having had first intermediate fiscal and political institutions that create incentives for elites to support them. Many of these intermediate level institutions relied on informal private-order arrangements that combined with public-order institutions associated with states, to lay the foundations of modern rule of law states.

In many poor and developing countries much land and housing are held outside the formal or legal property ownership registration system. In many urban areas the poor "invade" private or government land to build their houses, so they do not hold title to these properties. Much unregistered property is held in informal form through various property associations and other arrangements. Reasons for extra-legal ownership include excessive bureaucratic red tape in buying property and building; failures to notarize transaction documents; or having documents notarized but failing to have them recorded with the official agency. According to Hernando De Soto, unclear property rights limits economic growth, as people cannot use land as collateral to secure loans, depriving many poor countries of one of their most important potential sources of capital. Unregistered businesses and lack of accepted accounting methods are other factors that limit potential capital. Businesses and individuals participating in unreported business activity and owners of unregistered property face costs such as bribes and pay-offs that offset much of any taxes avoided. Time to approval and compliance costs tend to decrease economic growth.

According to Daron Acemoglu, Simon Johnson and James Robinson, the positive correlation between high income and cold climate is a by-product of history. Europeans adopted very different colonization policies in different colonies, with different associated institutions. In places where these colonizers faced high mortality rates (e.g., due to the presence of tropical diseases), they could not settle permanently, and they were thus more likely to establish extractive institutions, which persisted after independence; in places where they could settle permanently (e.g. those with temperate climates), they established institutions with this objective in mind and modeled them after those in their European homelands. In these 'neo-Europes' better institutions in turn produced better development outcomes. Thus, although other economists focus on the identity or type of legal system of the colonizers to explain institutions, these authors look at the environmental conditions in the colonies to explain institutions. For instance, former colonies have inherited corrupt governments and geopolitical boundaries (set by the colonizers) that are not properly placed regarding the geographical locations of different ethnic groups, creating internal disputes and conflicts that hinder development. In another example, societies that emerged in colonies without solid native populations established better property rights and incentives for long-term investment than those where native populations were large.

UNESCO and the United Nations consider that cultural property protection, high-quality education, cultural diversity and social cohesion in armed conflicts are particularly necessary for qualitative growth.

Economic growth, its sustainability and its distribution remain central aspects of government policy. For example, the UK Government recognises that "Government can play an important role in supporting economic growth by helping to level the playing field through the way it buys public goods, works and services", and "Post-Pandemic Economic Growth" has been featured in a series of inquiries undertaken by the parliamentary Business, Energy and Industrial Strategy Committee, which argues that the UK Government "has a big job to do in helping businesses survive, stimulating economic growth and encouraging the creation of well-paid meaningful jobs".

=== Democracy and economic growth ===
"Democracy Does Cause Growth", according to Acemoglu et al. Specifically, they state that "democracy increases future GDP by encouraging investment, increasing schooling, inducing economic reforms, improving public goods provision, and reducing social unrest".

In Why Nations Fail, Acemoglu and Robinson said that the English in North America started by trying to repeat the success of the Spanish Conquistadors in extracting wealth (especially gold and silver) from the countries they had conquered. This system repeatedly failed for the English. Their successes rested on giving land and a voice in the government to every male settler to incentivize productive labor. In Virginia it took twelve years and many deaths from starvation before the governor decided to try democracy.

=== Entrepreneurs and new products ===
Policymakers and scholars frequently emphasize the importance of entrepreneurship for economic growth. However, surprisingly few research empirically examine and quantify entrepreneurship's impact on growth. This is due to endogeneity—forces that drive economic growth also drive entrepreneurship. In other words, the empirical analysis of the impact of entrepreneurship on growth is difficult because of the joint determination of entrepreneurship and economic growth. A few papers use quasi-experimental designs, and have found that entrepreneurship and the density of small businesses indeed have a causal impact on regional growth.

Another major cause of economic growth is the introduction of new products and services and the improvement of existing products. New products create demand, which is necessary to offset the decline in employment that occurs through labor-saving technology (and to a lesser extent employment declines due to savings in energy and materials). In the U.S. by 2013 about 60% of consumer spending was for goods and services that did not exist in 1869. Also, the creation of new services has been more important than invention of new goods.

=== Structural change ===
Economic growth in the U.S. and other developed countries went through phases that affected growth through changes in the labor force participation rate and the relative sizes of economic sectors. The transition from an agricultural economy to manufacturing increased the size of the sector with high output per hour (the high-productivity manufacturing sector), while reducing the size of the sector with lower output per hour (the lower productivity agricultural sector). Eventually high productivity growth in manufacturing reduced the sector size, as prices fell and employment shrank relative to other sectors. The service and government sectors, where output per hour and productivity growth is low, saw increases in their shares of the economy and employment during the 1990s. The public sector has since contracted, while the service economy expanded in the 2000s.

== Growth theories ==
=== Adam Smith ===
Adam Smith pioneered modern economic growth and performance theory in his book The Wealth of Nations, first published in 1776. For Smith, the main factors of economic growth are division of labour and capital accumulation. However, these are conditioned by what he calls "the extent of the market". This is conditioned notably by geographic factors but also institutional ones such as the political-legal environment.

=== Malthusian theory ===
Malthusianism is the idea that population growth is potentially exponential while the growth of the food supply or other resources is linear, which eventually reduces living standards to the point of triggering a population die off. The Malthusian theory also proposes that over most of human history technological progress caused larger population growth but had no impact on income per capita in the long run. According to the theory, while technologically advanced economies over this epoch were characterized by higher population density, their level of income per capita was not different from those among technologically regressed society.

The conceptual foundations of the Malthusian theory were formed by Thomas Malthus, and a modern representation of these approach is provided by Ashraf and Galor. In line with the predictions of the Malthusian theory, a cross-country analysis finds a significant positive effect of the technological level on population density and an insignificant effect on income per capita significantly over the years 1–1500.

=== Classical growth theory ===
In classical (Ricardian) economics, the theory of production and the theory of growth are based on the theory of sustainability and law of variable proportions, whereby increasing either of the factors of production (labor or capital), while holding the other constant and assuming no technological change, will increase output, but at a diminishing rate that eventually will approach zero. These concepts have their origins in Thomas Malthus's theorizing about agriculture. Malthus's examples included the number of seeds harvested relative to the number of seeds planted (capital) on a plot of land and the size of the harvest from a plot of land versus the number of workers employed. (See also Diminishing returns)

Criticisms of classical growth theory are that technology, an important factor in economic growth, is held constant and that economies of scale are ignored.

One popular theory in the 1940s was the big push model, which suggested that countries needed to jump from one stage of development to another through a virtuous cycle, in which large investments in infrastructure and education coupled with private investments would move the economy to a more productive stage, breaking free from economic paradigms appropriate to a lower productivity stage. The idea was revived and formulated rigorously, in the late 1980s by Kevin Murphy, Andrei Shleifer and Robert Vishny.

=== Solow–Swan model ===
Robert Solow and Trevor Swan developed what eventually became the main model used in growth economics in the 1950s. This model assumes that there are diminishing returns to capital and labor. Capital accumulates through investment, but its level or stock continually decreases due to depreciation. Due to the diminishing returns to capital, with increases in capital/worker and absent technological progress, economic output/worker eventually reaches a point where capital per worker and economic output/worker remain constant because annual investment in capital equals annual depreciation. This condition is called the 'steady state'.

In the Solow–Swan model if productivity increases through technological progress, then output/worker increases even when the economy is in the steady state. If productivity increases at a constant rate, output/worker also increases at a related steady-state rate. As a consequence, growth in the model can occur either by increasing the share of GDP invested or through technological progress. But at whatever share of GDP invested, capital/worker eventually converges on the steady state, leaving the growth rate of output/worker determined only by the rate of technological progress. As a consequence, with world technology available to all and progressing at a constant rate, all countries have the same steady state rate of growth. Each country has a different level of GDP/worker determined by the share of GDP it invests, but all countries have the same rate of economic growth. Implicitly in this model rich countries are those that have invested a high share of GDP for a long time. Poor countries can become rich by increasing the share of GDP they invest. One important prediction of the model, mostly borne out by the data, is that of conditional convergence; the idea that poor countries will grow faster and catch up with rich countries as long as they have similar investment (and saving) rates and access to the same technology.

The Solow–Swan model is considered an "exogenous" growth model because it does not explain why countries invest different shares of GDP in capital nor why technology improves over time. Instead, the rate of investment and the rate of technological progress are exogenous. The value of the model is that it predicts the pattern of economic growth once these two rates are specified. Its failure to explain the determinants of these rates is one of its limitations.

Although the rate of investment in the model is exogenous, under certain conditions the model implicitly predicts convergence in the rates of investment across countries. In a global economy with a global financial capital market, financial capital flows to the countries with the highest return on investment. In the Solow-Swan model countries with less capital/worker (poor countries) have a higher return on investment due to the diminishing returns to capital. As a consequence, capital/worker and output/worker in a global financial capital market should converge to the same level in all countries. Since historically financial capital has not flowed to the countries with less capital/worker, the basic Solow–Swan model has a conceptual flaw. Beginning in the 1990s, this flaw has been addressed by adding additional variables to the model that can explain why some countries are less productive than others and, therefore, do not attract flows of global financial capital even though they have less (physical) capital/worker.

In practice, convergence was rarely achieved. In 1957, Solow applied his model to data from the U.S. gross national product to estimate contributions. This showed that the increase in capital and labor stock only accounted for about half of the output, while the population increase adjustments to capital explained eighth. This remaining unaccounted growth output is known as the Solow Residual. Here the A of (t) "technical progress" was the reason for increased output. Nevertheless, the model still had flaws. It gave no room for policy to influence the growth rate. Few attempts were also made by the RAND Corporation the non-profit think tank and frequently visiting economist Kenneth Arrow to work out the kinks in the model. They suggested that new knowledge was indivisible and that it is endogenous with a certain fixed cost. Arrow's further explained that new knowledge obtained by firms comes from practice and built a model that "knowledge" accumulated through experience.

=== Endogenous growth theory ===
Unsatisfied with the assumption of exogenous technological progress in the Solow–Swan model, economists worked to "endogenize" (i.e., explain it "from within" the models) productivity growth in the 1980s. The resulting endogenous growth theory, most notably advanced by Robert Lucas, Jr. and his student Paul Romer, includes a mathematical explanation of technological advancement. This model was notable for its incorporation of human capital, which is interpreted from changes to investment patterns in education, training, and healthcare by private sector firms or governments. Notwithstanding the implications this component has for policy, the endogenous perspective on human capital investment emphasizes the possibility for broad-based effects which can be realized by other firms in the economy. Accordingly, human capital is theorized to deliver increasing rates of return unlike physical capital. Research done in this area has focused on what increases human capital (e.g. education) or technological change (e.g. innovation).

On Memorial Day weekend in 1988, a conference in Buffalo brought together influential thinkers to evaluate the conflicting theories of growth. Romer, Krugman, Barro, and Becker were in attendance along with many other high profiled economists of the time. Amongst many papers that day the one that stood out was Romer's "Micro Foundations for Aggregate Technological Change". The Micro Foundation claimed that endogenous technological change had the concept of Intellectual Property imbedded and that knowledge is an input and output of production. Romer argued that outcomes to the national growth rates were significantly affected by public policy, trade activity, and intellectual property. He stressed that cumulative capital and specialization were key, and that not only population growth can increase capital of knowledge, it was human capital that is specifically trained in harvesting new ideas.

While intellectual property may be important, Baker (2016) cites multiple sources claiming that "stronger patent protection seems to be associated with slower growth". That's particularly true for patents in the ethical health care industry. In effect taxpayers pay twice for new drugs and diagnostic procedures: First in tax subsidies and second for the high prices of diagnostic procedures treatments. If the results of research paid by taxpayers were placed in the public domain, Baker claims that people everywhere would be healthier, because better diagnoses and treatment would be more affordable the world over.

One branch of endogenous growth theory was developed on the foundations of the Schumpeterian theory, named after the 20th-century Austrian economist Joseph Schumpeter. The approach explains growth as a consequence of innovation and a process of creative destruction that captures the dual nature of technological progress: in terms of creation, entrepreneurs introduce new products or processes in the hope that they will enjoy temporary monopoly-like profits as they capture markets. In doing so, they make old technologies or products obsolete. This can be seen as an annulment of previous technologies, which makes them obsolete, and "destroys the rents generated by previous innovations". A major model that illustrates Schumpeterian growth is the Aghion–Howitt model.

=== Unified growth theory ===
Unified growth theory was developed by Oded Galor and his co-authors to address the inability of endogenous growth theory to explain key empirical regularities in the growth processes of individual economies and the world economy as a whole. Unlike endogenous growth theory that focuses entirely on the modern growth regime and is therefore unable to explain the roots of inequality across nations, unified growth theory captures in a single framework the fundamental phases of the process of development in the course of human history: (i) the Malthusian epoch that was prevalent over most of human history, (ii) the escape from the Malthusian trap, (iii) the emergence of human capital as a central element in the growth process, (iv) the onset of the fertility decline, (v) the origins of the modern era of sustained economic growth, and (vi) the roots of divergence in income per capita across nations in the past two centuries. The theory suggests that during most of human existence, technological progress was offset by population growth, and living standards were near subsistence across time and space. However, the reinforcing interaction between the rate of technological progress and the size and composition of the population has gradually increased the pace of technological progress, enhancing the importance of education in the ability of individuals to adapt to the changing technological environment. The rise in the allocation of resources towards education triggered a fertility decline enabling economies to allocate a larger share of the fruits of technological progress to a steady increase in income per capita, rather than towards the growth of population, paving the way for the emergence of sustained economic growth. The theory further suggests that variations in biogeographical characteristics, as well as cultural and institutional characteristics, have generated a differential pace of transition from stagnation to growth across countries and consequently divergence in their income per capita over the past two centuries.

== Inequality and growth ==
=== Theories ===
The prevailing views about the role of inequality in the growth process has radically shifted in the past century.

The classical perspective, as expressed by Adam Smith, and others, suggests that inequality fosters the growth process. Specifically, since the aggregate saving increases with inequality due to higher property to save among the wealthy, the classical viewpoint suggests that inequality stimulates capital accumulation and therefore economic growth.

The Neoclassical perspective that is based on representative agent approach denies the role of inequality in the growth process. It suggests that while the growth process may affect inequality, income distribution has no impact on the growth process.

The modern perspective which has emerged in the late 1980s suggests, in contrast, that income distribution has a significant impact on the growth process. The modern perspective, originated by Galor and Zeira, highlights the important role of heterogeneity in the determination of aggregate economic activity, and economic growth. In particular, Galor and Zeira argue that since credit markets are imperfect, inequality has an enduring impact on human capital formation, the level of income per capita, and the growth process. In contrast to the classical paradigm, which underlined the positive implications of inequality for capital formation and economic growth, Galor and Zeira argue that inequality has an adverse effect on human capital formation and the development process, in all but the very poor economies.

Later theoretical developments have reinforced the view that inequality has an adverse effect on the growth process. Specifically, Alesina and Rodrik and Persson and Tabellini advance a political economy mechanism and argue that inequality has a negative impact on economic development since it creates a pressure for distortionary redistributive policies that have an adverse effect on investment and economic growth.

In accordance with the credit market imperfection approach, a study by Roberto Perotti showed that inequality is associated with lower level of human capital formation (education, experience, apprenticeship) and higher level of fertility, while lower level of human capital is associated with lower growth and lower levels of economic growth. In contrast, his examination of the political economy channel found no support for the political economy mechanism. Consequently, the political economy perspective on the relationship between inequality and growth have been revised and later studies have established that inequality may provide an incentive for the elite to block redistributive policies and institutional changes. In particular, inequality in the distribution of land ownership provides the landed elite with an incentive to limit the mobility of rural workers by depriving them from education and by blocking the development of the industrial sector.

A unified theory of inequality and growth that captures that changing role of inequality in the growth process offers a reconciliation between the conflicting predictions of classical viewpoint that maintained that inequality is beneficial for growth and the modern viewpoint that suggests that in the presence of credit market imperfections, inequality predominantly results in underinvestment in human capital and lower economic growth. This unified theory of inequality and growth, developed by Oded Galor and Omer Moav, suggests that the effect of inequality on the growth process has been reversed as human capital has replaced physical capital as the main engine of economic growth. In the initial phases of industrialization, when physical capital accumulation was the dominating source of economic growth, inequality boosted the development process by directing resources toward individuals with higher propensity to save. However, in later phases, as human capital become the main engine of economic growth, more equal distribution of income, in the presence of credit constraints, stimulated investment in human capital and economic growth.

In 2013, French economist Thomas Piketty postulated that in periods when the average annual rate on return on investment in capital (r) exceeds the average annual growth in economic output (g), the rate of inequality will increase. According to Piketty, this is the case because wealth that is already held or inherited, which is expected to grow at the rate r, will grow at a rate faster than wealth accumulated through labor, which is more closely tied to g. An advocate of reducing inequality levels, Piketty suggests levying a global wealth tax in order to reduce the divergence in wealth caused by inequality.

=== Evidence: reduced form ===
The reduced form empirical relationship between inequality and growth was studied by Alberto Alesina and Dani Rodrik, and Torsten Persson and Guido Tabellini. They find that inequality is negatively associated with economic growth in a cross-country analysis.

Robert Barro reexamined the reduced form relationship between inequality on economic growth in a panel of countries. He argues that there is "little overall relation between income inequality and rates of growth and investment". However, his empirical strategy limits its applicability to the understanding of the relationship between inequality and growth for several reasons. First, his regression analysis control for education, fertility, investment, and it therefore excludes, by construction, the important effect of inequality on growth via education, fertility, and investment. His findings simply imply that inequality has no direct effect on growth beyond the important indirect effects through the main channels proposed in the literature. Second, his study analyzes the effect of inequality on the average growth rate in the following 10 years. However, existing theories suggest that the effect of inequality will be observed much later, as is the case in human capital formation, for instance. Third, the empirical analysis does not account for biases that are generated by reverse causality and omitted variables.

Recent papers based on superior data, find negative relationship between inequality and growth. Andrew Berg and Jonathan Ostry of the International Monetary Fund, find that "lower net inequality is robustly correlated with faster and more durable growth, controlling for the level of redistribution". Likewise, Dierk Herzer and Sebastian Vollmer find that increased income inequality reduces economic growth.

=== Evidence: mechanisms ===
The Galor and Zeira's model predicts that the effect of rising inequality on GDP per capita is negative in relatively rich countries but positive in poor countries. These testable predictions have been examined and confirmed empirically in recent studies. In particular, Brückner and Lederman test the prediction of the model by in the panel of countries during the period 1970–2010, by considering the impact of the interaction between the level of income inequality and the initial level of GDP per capita. In line with the predictions of the model, they find that at the 25th percentile of initial income in the world sample, a 1 percentage point increase in the Gini coefficient increases income per capita by 2.3%, whereas at the 75th percentile of initial income a 1 percentage point increase in the Gini coefficient decreases income per capita by -5.3%. Moreover, the proposed human capital mechanism that mediates the effect of inequality on growth in the Galor-Zeira model is also confirmed. Increases in income inequality increase human capital in poor countries but reduce it in high and middle-income countries.

This recent support for the predictions of the Galor-Zeira model is in line with earlier findings. Roberto Perotti showed that in accordance with the credit market imperfection approach, developed by Galor and Zeira, inequality is associated with lower level of human capital formation (education, experience, apprenticeship) and higher level of fertility, while lower level of human capital is associated with lower levels of economic growth. Princeton economist Roland Benabou's finds that the growth process of Korea and the Philippines "are broadly consistent with the credit-constrained human-capital accumulation hypothesis". In addition, Andrew Berg and Jonathan Ostry suggest that inequality seems to affect growth through human capital accumulation and fertility channels.

In contrast, Perotti argues that the political economy mechanism is not supported empirically. Inequality is associated with lower redistribution, and lower redistribution (under-investment in education and infrastructure) is associated with lower economic growth.

== Long-term growth ==
Annual gdp growth

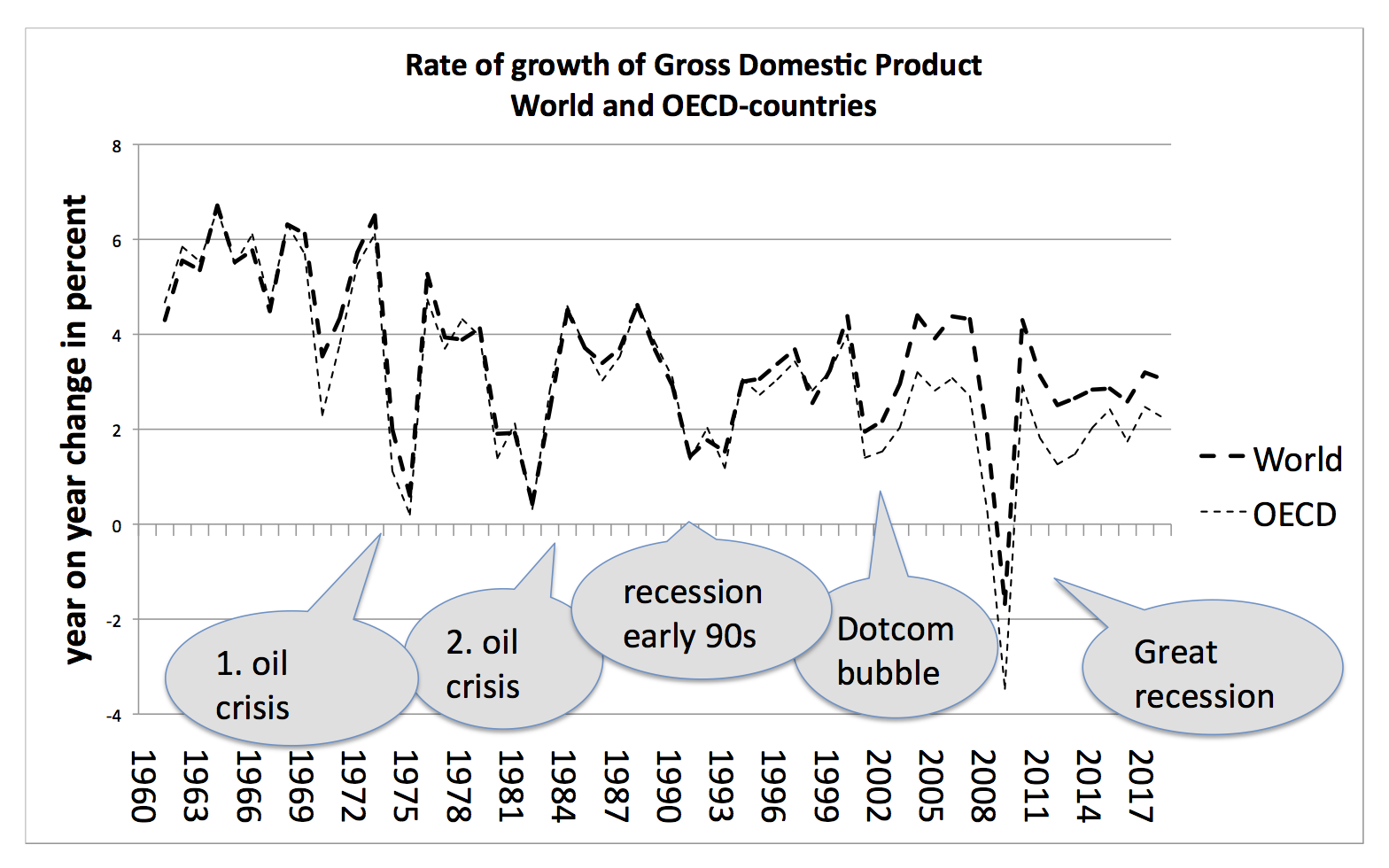
Rate of change of GDP, world and OECD, since 1961

Living standards vary widely from country to country, and furthermore, the change in living standards over time varies widely from country to country. Below is a table which shows GDP per person and annualized per person GDP growth for a selection of countries over a period of about 100 years. The GDP per person data are adjusted for inflation, hence they are "real".

Economic growth by country
Country	Period	Real GDP per person at beginning of period	Real GDP per person at end of period	Real annualized growth rate
Japan	1890–2008	$1,504	$35,220	2.71%
Brazil	1900–2008	$779	$10,070	2.40%
Mexico	1900–2008	$1,159	$14,270	2.35%
Germany	1870–2008	$2,184	$35,940	2.05%
Canada	1870–2008	$2,375	$36,220	1.99%
China	1900–2008	$716	$6,020	1.99%
United States	1870–2008	$4,007	$46,970	1.80%
Argentina	1900–2008	$2,293	$14,020	1.69%
United Kingdom	1870–2008	$4,808	$36,130	1.47%
India	1900–2008	$675	$2,960	1.38%
Indonesia	1900–2008	$891	$3,830	1.36%
Bangladesh	1900–2008	$623	$1,440	0.78%

Seemingly small differences in yearly GDP growth lead to large changes in GDP when compounded over time. For instance, in the above table, GDP per person in the United Kingdom in the year 1870 was $4,808. At the same time in the United States, GDP per person was $4,007, lower than the UK by about 20%. However, in 2008 the positions were reversed: GDP per person was $36,130 in the United Kingdom and $46,970 in the United States, i.e. GDP per person in the US was 30% more than it was in the UK. As the above table shows, this means that GDP per person grew, on average, by 1.80% per year in the US and by 1.47% in the UK. Thus, a difference in GDP growth by only a few tenths of a percent per year results in large differences in outcomes when the growth is persistent over a generation. This and other observations have led some economists to view GDP growth as the most important part of the field of macroeconomics:

...if we can learn about government policy options that have even small effects on long-term growth rates, we can contribute much more to improvements in standards of living than has been provided by the entire history of macroeconomic analysis of countercyclical policy and fine-tuning. Economic growth [is] the part of macroeconomics that really matters.

=== Importance of long-run growth ===
Over long periods of time, even small rates of growth, such as a 2% annual increase, have large effects. For example, the United Kingdom experienced a 1.97% average annual increase in its inflation-adjusted GDP between 1830 and 2008. In 1830, the GDP was 41,373 million pounds. It grew to 1,330,088 million pounds by 2008. A growth rate that averaged 1.97% over 178 years resulted in a 32-fold increase in GDP by 2008.

The large impact of a relatively small growth rate over a long period of time is due to the power of exponential growth. The rule of 72, a mathematical result, states that if something grows at the rate of x% per year, then its level will double every 72/x years. For example, a growth rate of 2.5% per annum leads to a doubling of the GDP within 28.8 years, whilst a growth rate of 8% per year leads to a doubling of GDP within nine years. Thus, a small difference in economic growth rates between countries can result in very different standards of living for their populations if this small difference continues for many years.

== Considerations ==
=== Quality of life ===
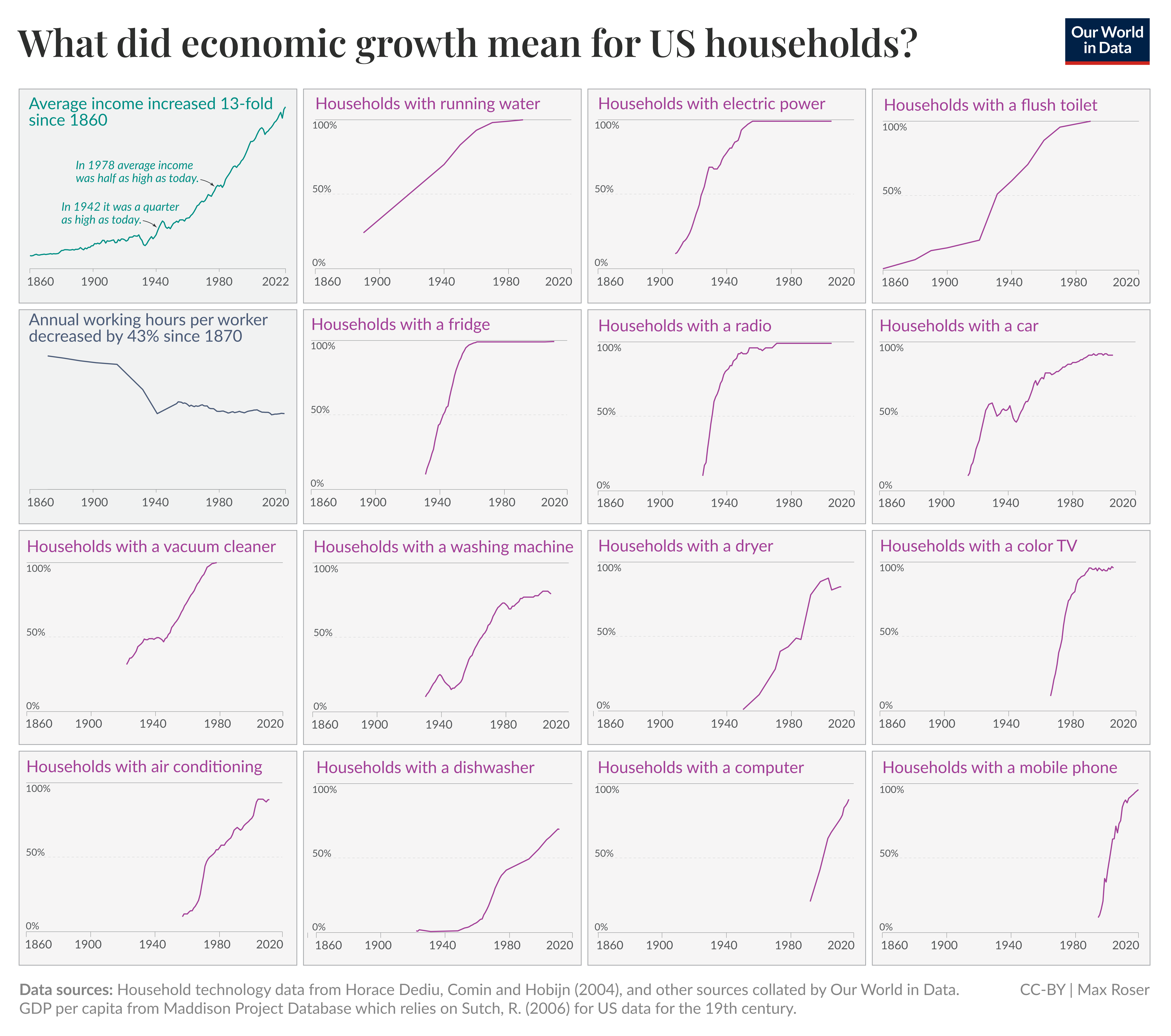
Economic growth in the United States (1860–2020) measured in two ways: (top left) real income per capita (GDP per capita), and (pink panels) the share of households with access to basic services and consumer goods such as electricity, sanitation, household appliances, and communication technologies.

One theory that relates economic growth with quality of life is the "Threshold Hypothesis", which states that economic growth up to a point brings with it an increase in quality of life. But at that point – called the threshold point – further economic growth can bring with it a deterioration in quality of life. This results in an upside-down-U-shaped curve, where the vertex of the curve represents the level of growth that should be targeted. Happiness has been shown to increase with GDP per capita, at least up to a level of $15,000 per person.

Economic growth has the indirect potential to alleviate poverty, as a result of a simultaneous increase in employment opportunities and increased labor productivity. A study by researchers at the Overseas Development Institute (ODI) of 24 countries that experienced growth found that in 18 cases, poverty was alleviated.

In some instances, quality of life factors such as healthcare outcomes and educational attainment, as well as social and political liberties, do not improve as economic growth occurs.

Productivity increases do not always lead to wage growth, as can be seen in the United States, where the gap between productivity and wages has been rising since the 1980s.

=== Equitable growth ===
While acknowledging the central role economic growth can potentially play in human development, poverty reduction and the achievement of the Millennium Development Goals, it is becoming widely understood amongst the development community that special efforts must be made to ensure poorer sections of society are able to participate in economic growth. The effect of economic growth on poverty reduction – the growth elasticity of poverty – can depend on the existing level of inequality. For instance, with low inequality a country with a growth rate of 2% per head and 40% of its population living in poverty, can halve poverty in ten years, but a country with high inequality would take nearly 60 years to achieve the same reduction. In the words of the Secretary-General of the United Nations Ban Ki-moon: "While economic growth is necessary, it is not sufficient for progress on reducing poverty."

=== Environmental impact ===
Critics such as the Club of Rome argue that a narrow view of economic growth, combined with globalization, is creating a scenario where we could see a systemic collapse of our planet's natural resources.

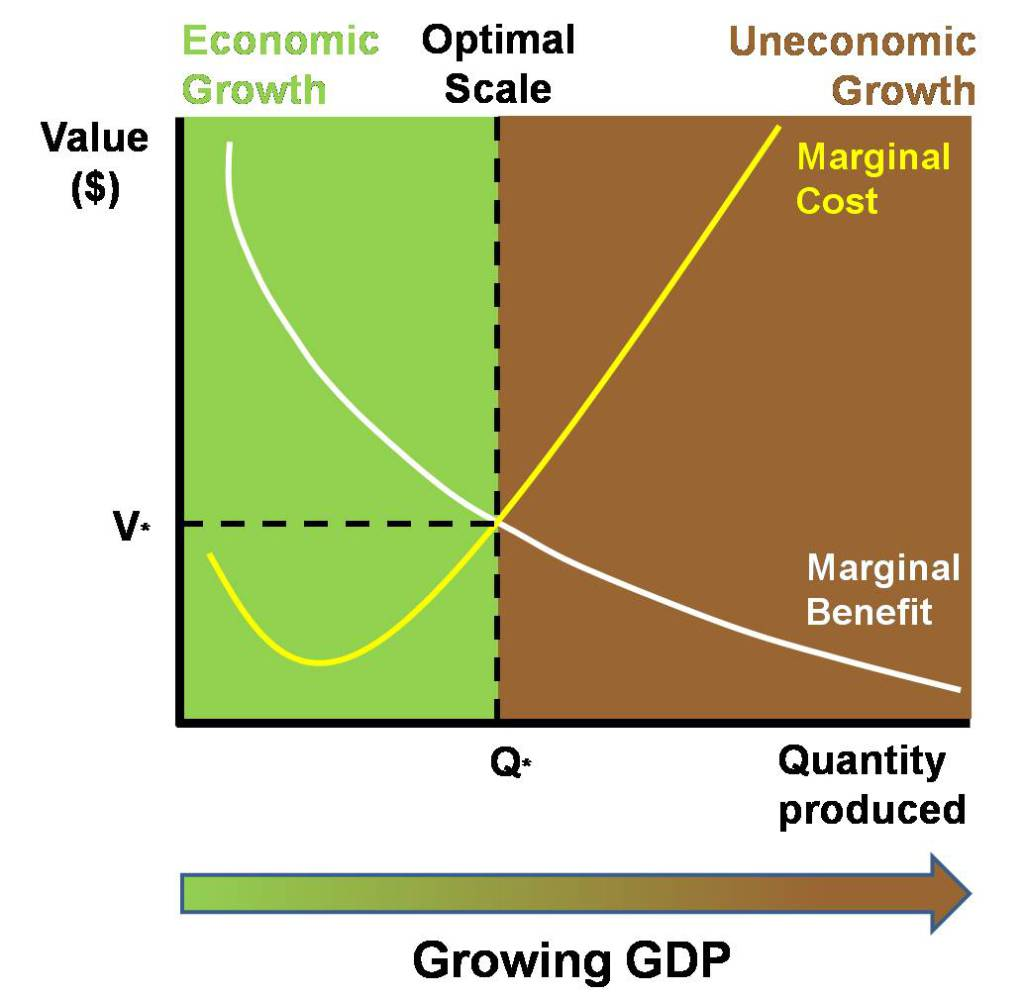
Conceptual diagram used in ecological economics illustrating the idea that the marginal costs of economic growth could surpass its marginal benefits

Concerns about negative environmental effects of growth have prompted some people to advocate lower levels of growth, or the abandoning of growth altogether. In academia, concepts like uneconomic growth, steady-state economy, eco-taxes, green investments, basic income guarantees, along with more radical approaches associated with degrowth, commoning, eco-socialism and eco-anarchism have been developed in order to achieve this and to overcome possible growth imperatives. In politics, green parties embrace the Global Greens Charter, recognising that "... the dogma of economic growth at any cost and the excessive and wasteful use of natural resources without considering Earth's carrying capacity, are causing extreme deterioration in the environment and a massive extinction of species."

The 2019 Global Assessment Report on Biodiversity and Ecosystem Services published by the United Nations' Intergovernmental Science-Policy Platform on Biodiversity and Ecosystem Services warned that given the substantial loss of biodiversity, society should not focus solely on economic growth. Anthropologist Eduardo S. Brondizio, one of the co-chairs of the report, said "We need to change our narratives. Both our individual narratives that associate wasteful consumption with quality of life and with status, and the narratives of the economic systems that still consider that environmental degradation and social inequality are inevitable outcomes of economic growth. Economic growth is a means and not an end. We need to look for the quality of life of the planet."

Those more optimistic about the environmental impacts of growth believe that, though localized environmental effects may occur, large-scale ecological effects are minor. The argument, as posited by commentator Julian Lincoln Simon, stated in 1981 that if these global-scale ecological effects exist, human ingenuity will find ways to adapt to them. Conversely Partha Dasgupta, in a 2021 report on the economics of biodiversity commissioned by the British Treasury, argued that biodiversity is collapsing faster than at any time in human history as a result of the demands of contemporary human civilization, which "far exceed nature's capacity to supply us with the goods and services we all rely on. We would require 1.6 Earths to maintain the world's current living standards." He says that major transformative changes will be needed "akin to, or even greater than, those of the Marshall Plan," including abandoning GDP as a measure of economic success and societal progress. Philip Cafaro, professor of philosophy at the School of Global Environmental Sustainability at Colorado State University, wrote in 2022 that a scientific consensus has emerged which demonstrates that humanity is on the precipice of unleashing a major extinction event, and that "the cause of global biodiversity loss is clear: other species are being displaced by a rapidly growing human economy."

In 2019, a warning on climate change signed by 11,000 scientists from over 150 nations said economic growth is the driving force behind the "excessive extraction of materials and overexploitation of ecosystems" and that this "must be quickly curtailed to maintain long-term sustainability of the biosphere". They add that "our goals need to shift from GDP growth and the pursuit of affluence toward sustaining ecosystems and improving human well-being by prioritizing basic needs and reducing inequality." A 2021 paper authored by top scientists in Frontiers in Conservation Science posited that given the environmental crises including biodiversity loss and climate change, and possible "ghastly future" facing humanity, there must be "fundamental changes to global capitalism," including the "abolition of perpetual economic growth".

In 2026, more than 350 scientists, including from UN agencies, after 18 months of work, signed the paper "A roadmap for eradicating poverty beyond growth". The paper say that for solving the linked problems of poverty and ecological degradation we need to abandon the growth paradigm and use better methods.

=== Global warming ===
Up to the present, there is a close correlation between economic growth and the rate of carbon dioxide emissions across nations, although there is also a considerable divergence in carbon intensity (carbon emissions per GDP). Up to the present, there is also a direct relation between global economic wealth and the rate of global emissions. The Stern Review notes that the prediction that, "Under business as usual, global emissions will be sufficient to propel greenhouse gas concentrations to over 550 ppm CO_{2} by 2050 and over 650–700 ppm by the end of this century is robust to a wide range of changes in model assumptions." The scientific consensus is that planetary ecosystem functioning without incurring dangerous risks requires stabilization at 450–550 ppm.

As a consequence, growth-oriented environmental economists propose government intervention into switching sources of energy production, favouring wind, solar, hydroelectric, and nuclear. This would largely confine use of fossil fuels to either domestic cooking needs (such as for kerosene burners) or where carbon capture and storage technology can be cost-effective and reliable. The Stern Review, published by the United Kingdom Government in 2006, concluded that an investment of 1% of GDP (later changed to 2%) would be sufficient to avoid the worst effects of climate change, and that failure to do so could risk climate-related costs equal to 20% of GDP. Because carbon capture and storage are as yet widely unproven, and its long term effectiveness (such as in containing carbon dioxide 'leaks') unknown, and because of current costs of alternative fuels, these policy responses largely rest on faith of technological change.

British conservative politician and journalist Nigel Lawson has deemed carbon emission trading an 'inefficient system of rationing'. Instead, he favours carbon taxes to make full use of the efficiency of the market. However, in order to avoid the migration of energy-intensive industries, the whole world should impose such a tax, not just Britain, Lawson pointed out. There is no point in taking the lead if nobody follows suit.

=== Resource constraint ===
Many earlier predictions of resource depletion, such as Thomas Malthus' 1798 predictions about approaching famines in Europe, The Population Bomb, and the Simon–Ehrlich wager (1980) have not materialized. Diminished production of most resources has not occurred so far, one reason being that advancements in technology and science have allowed some previously unavailable resources to be produced. In some cases, substitution of more abundant materials, such as plastics for cast metals, lowered growth of usage for some metals. In the case of the limited resource of land, famine was relieved firstly by the revolution in transportation caused by railroads and steam ships, and later by the Green Revolution and chemical fertilizers, especially the Haber process for ammonia synthesis.

Resource quality is composed of a variety of factors including ore grades, location, altitude above or below sea level, proximity to railroads, highways, water supply and climate. These factors affect the capital and operating cost of extracting resources. In the case of minerals, lower grades of mineral resources are being extracted, requiring higher inputs of capital and energy for both extraction and processing. Copper ore grades have declined significantly over the last century. Another example is natural gas from shale and other low permeability rock, whose extraction requires much higher inputs of energy, capital, and materials than conventional gas in previous decades. Offshore oil and gas have exponentially increased cost as water depth increases.

Some physical scientists like Sanyam Mittal regard continuous economic growth as unsustainable. Several factors may constrain economic growth – for example: finite, peaked, or depleted resources.

In 1972, The Limits to Growth study modeled limitations to infinite growth; originally ridiculed, some of the predicted trends have materialized, raising concerns of an impending collapse or decline due to resource constraints.

Malthusians such as William R. Catton, Jr. are skeptical of technological advances that improve resource availability. Such advances and increases in efficiency, they suggest, merely accelerate the drawing down of finite resources. Catton claims that increasing rates of resource extraction are "...stealing ravenously from the future".

=== Energy ===
Energy economic theories hold that rates of energy consumption and energy efficiency are linked causally to economic growth. The Garrett Relation holds that there has been a fixed relationship between current rates of global energy consumption and the historical accumulation of world GDP, independent of the year considered. It follows that economic growth, as represented by GDP growth, requires higher rates of energy consumption growth. Seemingly paradoxically, these are sustained through increases in energy efficiency. Increases in energy efficiency were a portion of the increase in Total factor productivity. Some of the most technologically important innovations in history involved increases in energy efficiency. These include the great improvements in efficiency of conversion of heat to work, the reuse of heat, the reduction in friction and the transmission of power, especially through electrification. There is a strong correlation between per capita electricity consumption and economic development.

== See also ==
- Agrowth
- American exceptionalism
- Civilizing mission
- Climate change
- Critique of political economy
- Degrowth
- Development theory
- Economic development
- Export-oriented industrialization
- Debt-to-GDP ratio
- Greed
- Green growth
- Green new deal
- Growth accounting
- Hindu rate of growth
- The Limits to Growth
- List of countries by productivity growth.
- Manifest destiny
- Orthodox Development
- Post-growth
- Productivism
- Progress
- Propaganda
- Prosperity Without Growth
- Status quo
- Sufficiency economy
- Sustainability
- Sustainable development
- Thermoeconomics
- Uneconomic growth
- Unified growth theory
- Universal basic income
- Wealth redistribution
- The White Man's Burden
- Win–win game
- World view
