= Aggregator =

Aggregator may refer to:

- Job ads aggregator, a website that aggregates job ads from various job boards, multiposter sites, as well as from direct employers and recruiting agencies
- News aggregator, software or a website that aggregates news or other content from various sources
- Poll aggregator, a website that aggregates polling data to gauge public sentiment on key political issues or to measure likely support for a candidate or party in an upcoming election
- Review aggregator, a website that aggregates reviews of movies or other products or services
- Search aggregator, software that aggregates search results from various search engines
- Social network aggregation, the collection of content from multiple social network services
- Video aggregator, a website that aggregates online videos from various sources

== See also ==
- Aggregate (disambiguation)
- Aggregation (disambiguation)
- Category:Aggregation-based digital libraries, digital libraries that are primarily based on aggregation or harvesting of other digital libraries or repositories
