= Aggregation =

Aggregation may refer to:

== Business and economics ==
- Aggregation problem (economics)
- Purchasing aggregation, the joining of multiple purchasers in a group purchasing organization to increase their buying power
- Community Choice Aggregation, the joining of geographically contiguous communities to bypass a conventional energy utility monopoly and seek a greener energy service

== Computer science and telecommunication ==
- Aggregate function, a type of function in data processing
- Aggregation, a form of object composition in object-oriented programming
- Link aggregation, using multiple Ethernet network cables/ports in parallel to increase link speed
- Packet aggregation, joining multiple data packets for transmission as a single unit to increase network efficiency
- Route aggregation, the process of forming a supernet in computer networking
- Aggregation, a process by which Australian country television markets were combined in the late 1980s and 1990s; see Regional television in Australia

== Natural sciences and statistics ==
- Aggregation (ethology), any gathering of organisms
- Aggregation of soil granules to form soil structure
- Particle aggregation, direct mutual attraction between particles (atoms or molecules) via van der Waals forces or chemical bonding
- The accumulation of platelets to the site of a wound to form a platelet plug or a thrombus
- Flocculation, a process where a solute comes out of solution in the form of floccules or flakes
- Overdispersion or statistical aggregation, where the variance of a distribution is higher than would be expected
- Aggregation pheromone
- Protein aggregation, the aggregation of mis-folded proteins

== Other uses ==
- Aggregation (linguistics), a merging of syntactic constituents
- Aggregation (magazine), a 2010–2012 Canadian online magazine

== See also ==
- Aggregate (disambiguation)
- Aggregator (disambiguation), a web site or computer software that aggregates syndicated web content
- Agrégation, in French-speaking countries, higher-level competitive examinations for teachers and professors
- Category:Aggregation-based digital libraries, digital libraries that are primarily based on aggregation or harvesting of other digital libraries or repositories
- Composition (disambiguation)
