= Gary Campbell =

Gary Campbell may refer to:

- Gary Campbell (linebacker) (born 1952), former American football linebacker
- Gary Campbell (American football coach) (born 1951), running backs coach for the University of Oregon football team
- Gary Campbell (quarterback), quarterback for Whittier College, 1956, 1958–1959
- Gary Campbell (graphic designer), Canadian graphic designer, art director, and publisher of Aggregation (magazine)
- Gary Scott Campbell (born 1954), Canadian former WHA and NHL player
- Gary Campbell, songwriter on 1980 album Bar Talk by John Scofield
