= Joseph Zeira =

Israeli academic (born 1950)

- יוסף זעירא
- Born: 1950 (age 75–76)

Academic background
- Education: Hebrew University of Jerusalem

Academic work
- Discipline: Macroeconomics, economic growth
- Institutions: Hebrew University of Jerusalem; LUISS University; Columbia University
- Website: Information at IDEAS / RePEc

Joseph Zeira (Hebrew: יוסף זעירא; born 1950) is an Israeli economist. His main work is in macroeconomics, economic growth and the economy of Israel. He is the Aaron and Michael Chilewich Professor of Economics at the Hebrew University of Jerusalem.

== Biography ==
Joseph Zeira received a B.Sc. in Mathematics and Physics in 1971 and after military service received an M.Sc. in Mathematics in 1976. He then moved to Economics and submitted his Ph.D. in 1983. All his degrees are from the Hebrew University of Jerusalem. After a post-doc at Harvard University, he returned to teach at the Hebrew University of Jerusalem. Since 2009, he has an additional position at LUISS in Rome, Italy. Over the years, Joseph Zeira visited for extended periods Northwestern University, Brown University, Harvard University, Brandeis University, the University of Crete, and Columbia University.

== Research contributions ==
The most well-known research of Joseph Zeira is his paper with Oded Galor, the Galor–Zeira model. It shows that if capital markets are imperfect, poor families cannot supply education to their children and that reduces human capital and output in the economy. The paper also provides an economic justification to public education. Another line of research, initiated by Joseph Zeira, examines how missing aggregate information on potential growth and the gradual learning about it can lead to fluctuations, both in output and in stock prices. A third important contribution is the modelling of technologies, which are embedded in machines that replace workers. He has shown that such technologies can explain much of modern economic growth and much of the gaps between rich and poor countries as well. His research on the Israeli economy offers new insights on this economy that differ from the standard wisdom. One example is that the Israeli–Palestinian conflict costs Israel much more than the standard measure of defense costs, due to productivity losses, and potential recessions.

== Academic positions ==
- Professor of Economics, Hebrew University of Jerusalem, 2007–present.
- Professor of Economics, LUISS Guido Carli, Rome, 2008–present.
- Aron and Michael Chilewich Chair in International Trade, 2006–present.
- Associate Professor of Economics, Hebrew University of Jerusalem, 1998–2007.
- Senior Lecturer, Department of Economics, Hebrew University of Jerusalem, 1991–1998.
- Lecturer, Department of Economics, Hebrew University of Jerusalem, 1985–1991.

== Visiting positions ==
- Visiting Professor, Department of Economics, Northwestern University, Spring 2018,2019.
- Marie Curie Visiting Professor, University of Crete, Fall 2007.
- Visiting Professor, Kennedy School of Government, Harvard University, 2001–2003.
- Visiting Professor, Department of Economics, Brandeis University, 1997.
- Visiting Professor, Department of Economics, Harvard University, 1991.
- Visiting Professor, Department of Economics, Brown University, 1990.
- Post-Doctoral Fellow, Department of Economics, MIT, 1985.
- Post-Doctoral Fellow, Department of Economics, Harvard University, 1984–1985.

== Public activities ==
In 1995–1996 Joseph Zeira served as an economic advisor to the Ministry of Finance of Israel.

Joseph Zeira is a member of the Aix Group. It consists of Israelis, Palestinians and Internationals, who study the economics of the potential peace agreement and of the conflict in general. He participated in the research on the agreement on Jerusalem, on the territorial link, on development in the Palestinian economy and on the impact of the conflict on the Israeli economy.

In 2011, Joseph Zeira led a team of economists who supported and advised the Israeli social protests.

In 2014, he served in a governmental committee on poverty in Israel.

== Selected publications ==
- Investment as a Process of Search, Journal of Political Economy, 95 (1987), 204-210. JSTOR 1831307
- Income Distribution and Macroeconomics, with Oded Galor, Review of Economic Studies, 60 (1993), 35-52. Also in Dilip Mookerjee and Debraj Ray (ed.) JSTOR 2297811
- Readings in the Theory of Economic Development, Blackwell, Oxford, 2000. Also in Oded Galor (ed.)
- Inequality and Economic Development, Edward Elgar, Cheltenham, UK, 2009.
- Informational Cycles, Review of Economic Studies, 61 (1994), 31-44. JSTOR 2297875
- Workers, Machines, and Economic Growth, Quarterly Journal of Economics, 113 (1998), 1091-1117.
- Informational Overshooting, Booms and Crashes, Journal of Monetary Economics, 43 (1999), 237-257.
- Israel 1983: A Bout of Unpleasant Monetarist Arithmetic, with Thomas J. Sargent, Review of Economic Dynamics, 14(2011), 419-431.

The Israeli Economy: A Story of Success and Costs. Princeton University Press, 2021.
