= Ursula Kathleen Hicks =

Economist

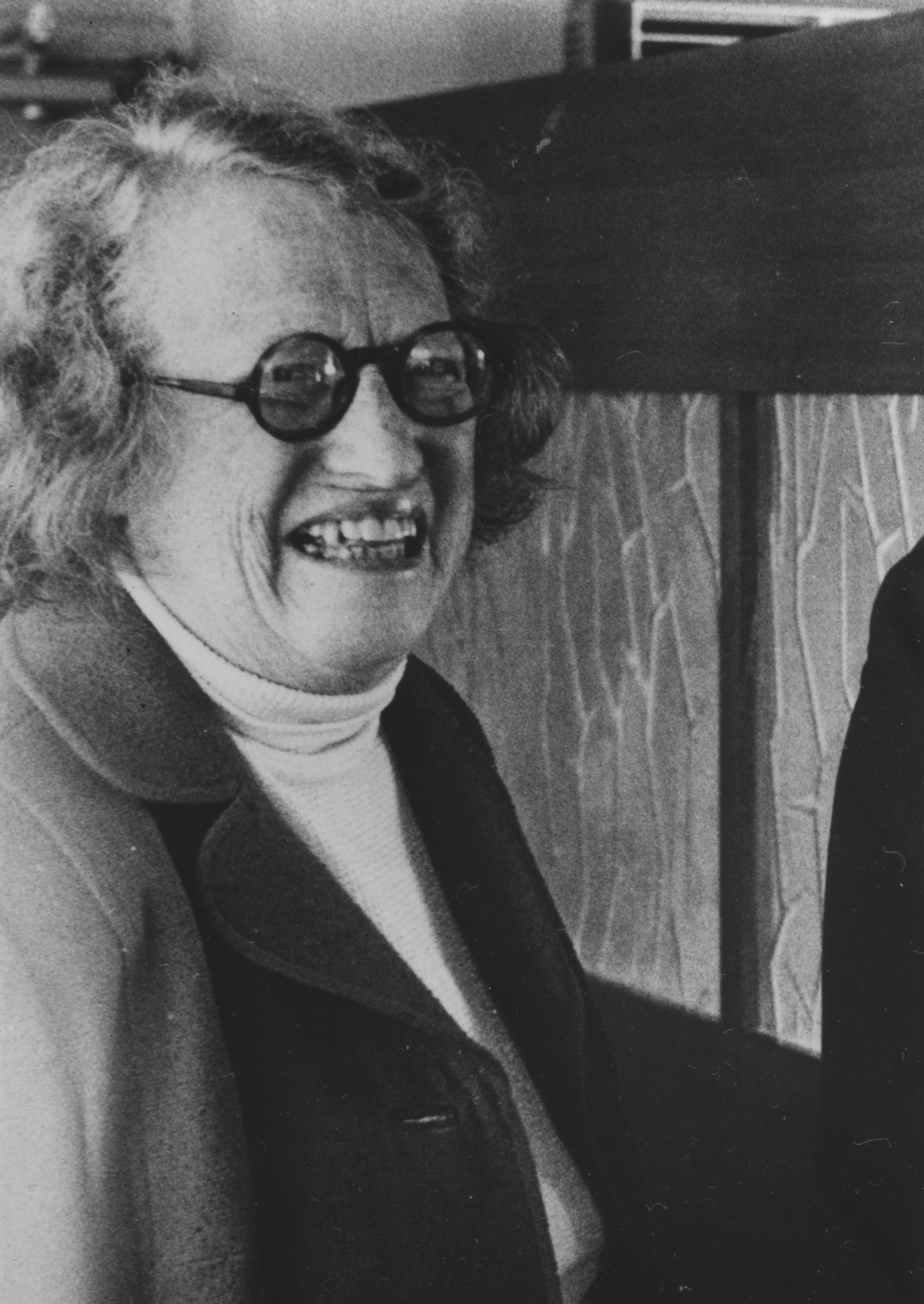
Lady Ursula Hicks

Ursula Kathleen Hicks (née Webb; 17 September 1896 – 16 July 1985), styled as Lady Hicks upon her marriage, was an Irish-born economist and academic.

== Early life ==
She was daughter of William and Isabella Webb, born in Dublin on 17 September 1896. She was educated at Roedean and Somerville College, University of Oxford. She studied and lectured at the London School of Economics. She married fellow academic Sir John Hicks in 1935.

== Academic career ==
Ursula Hicks was a renowned public finance and development economist. Hicks was a co-founder of the Review of Economic Studies and Managing Editor from 1933 to 1961. She was a Fellow of Linacre College, Oxford, where a building is named after her. Her 1946 paper argued against the economic usefulness of the distinction between direct taxes and indirect tax (as to who the nominal payer is) versus taxes on income and expenditures (outlays), a distinction now recognized in national accounting. Lady Hicks received an Honorary Fellowship at the Institute of Social Studies in 1967.

== Selected publications ==
- 1946. "The Terminology of Tax Analysis," Economic Journal, 56(221), p p. 38-50.
- 1947, 3rd ed., 1968. Public Finance, Cambridge Economic Handbooks.
- 1954, revised 1958. British Public Finances: Their Structure and Development 1880 - 1952, Oxford University Press
- 1961. Development from Below. Clarendon Press. Opening paragraph & review excerpt.
- 1978. Federalism: Failure and Success: A Comparative Study. Oxford. Review excerpt.

== Sources ==
- Alan Peacock, [1987] 2008. “Hicks, Ursula Kathleen (1896–1985)," The New Palgrave Dictionary of Economics.
