= Unified Growth Theory (book) =

2011 book by Oded Galor

- Cover
- Author: Oded Galor
- Language: English
- Subject: Economic growth, economic development, economic history
- Genre: Economics
- Publisher: Princeton University Press
- Publication date: May 1, 2011
- Publication place: United States
- Pages: 344
- ISBN: 978-0-691-13002-6
- Dewey Decimal: 338.9001
- LC Class: HD75.G348 2011

Unified Growth Theory is a 2011 book by Israeli-American scholar and economist Oded Galor that sets out the framework he advanced to explain the entire course of human economic development. It develops a unified framework of analysis that captures the entire process of human economic development from millennia of stagnation to the era of sustained growth. The theory identifies the universal forces that orchestrated this remarkable transformation in living standards over the past two centuries and contributed to the divergence in the wealth of nations.

Unified Growth Theory suggests that for most of human existence, technological advances expanded the size of the population but left living standards unchanged. Yet as the pace of progress quickened, propelled by the reinforcing interplay between population and technology, the growing demand for human capital led parents to favor the quality of their children over their number, setting in motion the demographic transition. Falling fertility released economies from the counterbalancing effects of population growth and, alongside the advance of knowledge and the rise of education, opened the path to sustained growth and modern prosperity. Variations in deeply rooted institutional, cultural, geographical, and human diversity factors shaped the differential timing of this transition across the globe, leading to the divergence in the wealth of nations observed over the past two centuries.

== Foundations and central hypothesis ==
What triggered the remarkable recent ascent of humankind from millennia of stagnation to an age of prosperity? And what are the roots of the vast disparities in wealth across nations? Unified Growth Theory, founded by Oded Galor explores the evolution of societies over the entire course of human history, identifying the universal forces that have governed the development process and shaped the distribution of income across countries. The theory sheds light on two of the most profound mysteries in the process of development: (i) the Mystery of Growth—the roots of the extraordinary surge in human prosperity during the past two centuries following an epoch of near-stagnation; and (ii) the Mystery of Inequality—the origins of the striking disparities in prosperity among nations.

Unified Growth Theory advances the hypothesis that forces operating in the distant past have shaped the growth process and contributed to the differential timing of the transition from stagnation to growth and the emergence of inequality across the globe. In light of growing evidence on the lasting legacy of historical and prehistorical forces on contemporary patterns of economic development, it maintains that the preoccupation of non-unified growth theory with societies that originate in the modern growth regime, abstracting from the forces that contributed to the transition from stagnation to growth, has limited our understanding of (i) the hurdles faced by developing countries in their attempt to achieve sustained economic growth and (ii) the roots of inequality in the wealth of nations.

Unified Growth Theory captures the evolution of human societies over the entire span of history. It unifies the defining features of the development process within a single analytical framework, encompassing: (a) the prolonged epoch of stagnation that characterized most of human existence; (b) the eventual escape from this trap, marked by simultaneous rises in income per capita and population; (c) the emergence of human-capital accumulation as a central driver of growth; (d) the trigger for the onset of the fertility decline; (e) the transition toward the modern era of sustained economic expansion; and (f) the widening disparities in prosperity across nations in the past two centuries.

Unified Growth Theory explores the underlying forces that have shaped the journey of humanity. It reveals how the reinforcing interaction between population growth, human adaptation, and technological progress operated persistently during the prolonged economic ice age, while exerting limited impact on income per capita, as technological progress was largely offset by population growth. However, it contends that this apparent stagnation concealed powerful evolutionary dynamics that ultimately brought about the take-off from stagnation to growth. As population size increased, so did the number of potential innovators, reinforcing technological progress in a self-perpetuating feedback loop that intensified over time until the acceleration of innovation surpassed a critical threshold and brought about a phase transition. Rudimentary education became essential for navigating the rapidly changing technological landscape, and as parental investment progressively shifted toward human-capital formation, a sharp decline in fertility rates liberated the growth process from the counterbalancing effects of population expansion, paving the way for enduring prosperity.

Yet, this transformation unfolded unevenly across the world. As prosperity surged over the past two centuries, it emerged earlier in some regions, giving rise to a defining feature of modern development—the vast inequality among societies. Western Europe and its offshoots experienced a dramatic improvement in living standards during the nineteenth century, whereas in much of the world this rise was delayed until the latter half of the twentieth century, resulting in striking global disparities in income and well-being. Differences in long-standing institutional, cultural, geographical, and human diversity factors influenced the pace and timing of this transition and contributed to the unequal distribution of wealth across nations observed today.

== Conceptual and methodological advances ==
A comprehensive theory of economic growth that is consistent with the historical record required the construction of a dynamical system capable of generating a gradual escape from a stable (absorbing) Malthusian equilibrium. At first glance, this seems inconsistent with the very notion of stability, which implies strong restorative forces that prevent such an escape. Unified Growth Theory resolves this apparent paradox by introducing a phase transition in which, within multidimensional nonlinear systems, the crossing of a critical threshold by one variable can transform the system's qualitative behavior—causing a stable equilibrium to disappear and a new equilibrium to emerge. In particular, the theory identifies the fundamental forces that accumulated throughout the Malthusian epoch and eventually reached a tipping point, beyond which the Malthusian equilibrium and its gravitational forces vanished, enabling a transition from the age of stagnation to an era of sustained growth.

The methodological and conceptual innovations underlying Unified Growth Theory made it possible to account for: (i) the spontaneous emergence from a globally stable Malthusian equilibrium that had characterized much of human history, and (ii) the inversion of the historical relationship between parental resources and reproductive success, which gave rise to a significant fertility decline and released the growth process from the constraining effects of population expansion.

== Influence ==
Unified Growth Theory has provided the foundation for a large body of empirical and theoretical research exploring the roots of contemporary inequality, the role of cultural and institutional evolution, and the historical interaction between technology and demography. The framework has reshaped the study of long-run development by linking prehistoric, historical, and modern processes into a unified explanation of humanity's economic ascent and the divergent patterns of prosperity across nations.

The theory suggests that, given the profound influence of historical origins on the evolution of human societies, the imprint of the distant past continues to shape their developmental trajectories. It implies that policies aimed at fostering growth and reducing inequality must be attuned to the unique historical and cultural fabric of each society. A universal prescription, indifferent to these deep-rooted legacies, would likely prove ineffective.

== Criticla reception ==
=== Academic ===
Robert Solow (Nobel Laureate in Economics) "Galor’s project is breathtakingly ambitious ... a powerful mixture of fact, theory, and interpretation."

Daron Acemoglu (Nobel Laureate in Economics) "Unified Growth Theory is a work of unusual ambition. Full of original and daring ideas, this book will inspire, motivate, and challenge economists."

Steven N. Durlauf "Unified Growth Theory is Big Science at its best. It grapples with some of the broadest questions in social science, integrating state-of-the-art economic theory with a rich exploration of a wide range of empirical evidence. Galor’s erudition and creativity are remarkable, and the ideas embodied in this book will have a lasting effect on economics."

Brian Snowdon "Oded Galor is one of the world’s leading and most imaginative growth theorists... [whose] work has emphasized the need for a unified theory of growth that … can account for the transition from Malthusian stagnation to the modern growth regime."

=== Blog Posts ===
==== Devpolicy Blog ====
"[U]nified growth theory is one of the most exciting theories, not just within economics, but also within macro-history. By identifying the wheels of change that have existed all along, it brings us closer to understanding the deep roots of inequality and the association between our own behavior as well as that of our ancestors."

==== Lessons in economic history ====
"In my view, UGT is one of the most significant contributions to macroeconomic theory in the past quarter century."

== Foreign editions ==
- Chinese Edition, China Renmin University Press, 2017
- Greek Edition, Broken Hill Publishers, 2023
- Hungarian Edition, MCC Press, 2022–2023
- Korean Edition, Penguin Random House, 2025

== Named lectures on Unified Growth Theory ==
- 2019 The Copernican Lecture (Nicolaus Copernicus University)
- 2019 The Ricardo Lecture (DEGIT)
- 2019 The Bogen Lecture (Hebrew University)
- 2016 The Zeuthen Lectures (University of Copenhagen)
- 2015 The Berglas Lecture (Tel Aviv University)
- 2012 The Maddison Lecture (University of Groningen)
- 2009 The Kuznets Lectures (Yale University)
- 2008 The Klein Lecture (Osaka University)
- Invited Lecture Series on UGT

== Honors and invited lectures ==
Unified Growth Theory has also been the focus of invited lecture series at major institutions, including:

- Kiel Institute for the World Economy
- University of St. Gallen
- Capri's Summer Workshop
- American Economic Association Continuing Education (AEA Meetings)
- Summer Workshop in Economic Growth, Warwick
- University of Luxembourg
- Bar-Ilan University
- University of Porto, Portugal
- Sciences Po, Paris
- Jerusalem Summer School in Economic Growth
- Ben-Gurion University
- Minerva Summer Workshop
- Danish Doctoral Program
- International Monetary Fund (IMF)
- European University Institute (EUI)
- Netherlands Joint Doctoral Program

=== Honors ===
Galor received several honorary doctorates in recognition of his development of Unified Growth Theory:

- Athens University of Economics and Business (AUEB)
- Catholic University of Louvain
- Nicolaus Copernicus University
- Poznań University of Economics and Business
