= The Review of Economic Studies =

- Discipline: Economics
- Language: English
- Edited by: Jan De Loecker, Xavier D’Haultfoeuille, Attila Lindner, Elias Papaioannou, Antonio Penta, Jakub Steiner, Vincent Sterk, Victoria Vanasco, Noam Yuchtman

Publication details
- History: 1933–present
- Publisher: Oxford University Press for The Review of Economic Studies Ltd (United Kingdom)
- Frequency: Quarterly
- Impact factor: 6.345 (2020)

Standard abbreviations
- ISO 4: Rev. Econ. Stud.

Indexing
- ISSN: 0034-6527 (print); 1467-937X (web)
- LCCN: 35031091
- JSTOR: 00346527
- OCLC no.: 1639811

Links
- Journal homepage; Journal page at Oxford University Press; Online access; Online archive

The Review of Economic Studies (also known as REStud) is a quarterly peer-reviewed academic journal covering economics. The journal is widely considered one of the top 5 journals in economics. It is managed by the editorial board currently chaired by Ruben Enikolopov. The current joint managing editors are Jan De Loecker at KU Leuven, Xavier D’Haultfoeuille at CREST, Attila Lindner at University College London, Elias Papaioannou at London Business School, Antonio Penta at Universitat Pompeu Fabra, Jakub Steiner at CERGE-EI and University of Zurich, Vincent Sterk at University College London, Victoria Vanasco at CREI, and Noam Yuchtman at the London School of Economics. According to the Journal Citation Reports, the journal has a 2020 impact factor of 6.345.

== History ==
The journal was founded in 1933 by a group of economists based in Britain and the United States. The original editorial team consisted of Abba P. Lerner, Paul Sweezy, and Ursula Kathleen Hicks. It is published by Oxford University Press. From the beginning, the board of editors has operated independently of any university department or learned society. The founding document of the journal stated that "The object of the Review is to supplement the facilities for the publication of new work on theoretical and applied economics, particularly by young writers." and that "Any member" of the editorial board "who becomes a Reader or Professor in a British University must resign his membership."

In its early years, the journal was used to log the macroeconomic debates of younger followers of Friedrich Hayek (such as Abba Lerner) and John Maynard Keynes (such as the members of the Cambridge Circus).

== Notable papers ==
Some of the most path-breaking and influential articles published in The Review of Economic Studies are:

- Lipsey, R. G.; Lancaster, Kelvin (1956). "The General Theory of Second Best". The Review of Economic Studies. 24 (1): 11–32. doi:10.2307/2296233. JSTOR 2296233.
- Arrow, Kenneth J. (1962). "The Economic Implications of Learning by Doing". The Review of Economic Studies. 29 (3): 155–173. doi:10.2307/2295952. JSTOR 2295952. S2CID 155029478.
- Mirrlees, J. A. (1971). "An Exploration in the Theory of Optimum Income Taxation". The Review of Economic Studies. 38 (2): 175–208. doi:10.2307/2296779. JSTOR 2296779. S2CID 15311903.
- Stiglitz, Joseph E. (1974). "Incentives and Risk Sharing in Sharecropping" (PDF). The Review of Economic Studies. 41 (2): 219–255. doi:10.2307/2296714. JSTOR 2296714.
- Breusch, T. S.; Pagan, A. R. (1980). "The Lagrange Multiplier Test and its Applications to Model Specification in Econometrics". The Review of Economic Studies. 47 (1): 239–253. doi:10.2307/2297111. JSTOR 2297111.
- Galor, Oded; Zeira, Joseph (1993). "Income Distribution and Macroeconomics" (PDF). The Review of Economic Studies. 60 (1): 35–52. doi:10.2307/2297811. JSTOR 2297811. S2CID 141057231.
- Manski, Charles F. (1993). "Identification of Endogenous Social Effects: The Reflection Problem" (PDF). The Review of Economic Studies. 60 (3): 531–542. doi:10.2307/2298123. JSTOR 2298123. S2CID 154470582.
- Mortensen, Dale T.; Pissarides, Christopher A. (1994). "Job Creation and Job Destruction in the Theory of Unemployment". The Review of Economic Studies. 61 (3): 397–415. doi:10.2307/2297896. JSTOR 2297896.
- Heckman, James J.; Ichimura, Hidehiko; Todd, Petra E. (1997). "Matching as an Econometric Evaluation Estimator: Evidence from Evaluating a Job Training Programme". The Review of Economic Studies. 64 (4): 605–654. doi:10.2307/2971733. JSTOR 2971733.
- Levinsohn, James; Petrin, Amil (2003). "Estimating Production Functions Using Inputs to Control for Unobservables" (PDF). The Review of Economic Studies. 70 (2): 317–341. doi:10.1111/1467-937X.00246. JSTOR 3648636.
- Bénabou, Roland; Tirole, Jean (2003). "Intrinsic and Extrinsic Motivation". The Review of Economic Studies. 70 (3): 489–520. doi:10.1111/1467-937X.00253. JSTOR 3648598. S2CID 14666099.
