= Orthodox Development =

Economic growth equated with development

The Orthodox Development view equates economic growth with 'development'. The gross national product of a country has continually been used by intergovernmental organisations such as the UN, to equate their economical stance to their level of 'development'. This approach to human progress has been critiqued consistently throughout its history, especially by economists such as Dambisa Moyo, with the main criticisms being that the approach is ethnocentric and one-dimensional.

During the 1950s and 1960s as decolonisation progressed, the focus of the World Bank and the UN system generally shifted to the perceived needs of developing countries. There was widespread belief in the developed Western countries, such as the United States and the United Kingdom, among the managers of the major multilateral institutions, such as the European Union, and throughout the UN system, that 'Third World' states were economically 'backward' and needed to be 'developed'. This process would require intervention in their economies. This attitude is now widely opposed by a number of African economists, such as James Shikwati, who claims aid (and intervention in African states) does more harm than good. "The underlying assumption was that the Western lifestyle and mode of economic organisation were superior and should be universally aspired to." This became known as the Orthodox view of development.

== Rostow ==
The most famous Orthodox view of development is that of Walt Whitman Rostow, which suggests economic development occurs where there are certain preconditions that exist to enable countries to 'take off', with the right stimulus. Development therefore goes through set stages and always occurs in the same way.

Rostow argues that countries wherein preconditions such as: entrepreneurial, trade opportunities, available capital and workforce do not exist, the state should intervene to provide those things. Most forms of aid operate in this way; it is agreed that certain countries do not possess the necessary resources or 'pre-conditions' to become a developed country, or if they do possess them, they should be helped to actualise them through outside knowledge and expertise.

Economies, as outlined in Rostow's take-off model, will eventually reach a 'take-off' point and thereafter wealth would trickle down to those at the bottom. There is a belief, however, that this process will eventually benefit everyone; eventually everyone will reach a high standard of living. This process, however, unlike Alternative View, does not highlight the importance of nature, it assumes nature to be dominated and exploited.

The purpose of this view, as outlined in 'The Globalisation of World Politics', is to transform 'backward' economies into industrial, 'modern' economies. The 'Western' model is superior as it has proved most successful, therefore it should be followed and that knowledge should be used. States should aim to be able to produce and sell surplus; profit and growth are key.

The way in which the orthodox view measures development is economic growth. If a state is economically strong and growing, it is a developing/developed state. Measurements of gross domestic product (GDP) per capita, industrialisation (including agriculture) are used to determine levels of development.

Poverty is measured by the ability to buy food and satisfy other basic material needs. Unlike the Alternative View, it does not recognise non-material needs. With this view, there is a reliance on external 'expert knowledge', as opposed to local 'grassroot' knowledge.
