= Elias Papaioannou =

Greek economist and academic

Elias Papaioannou FBA
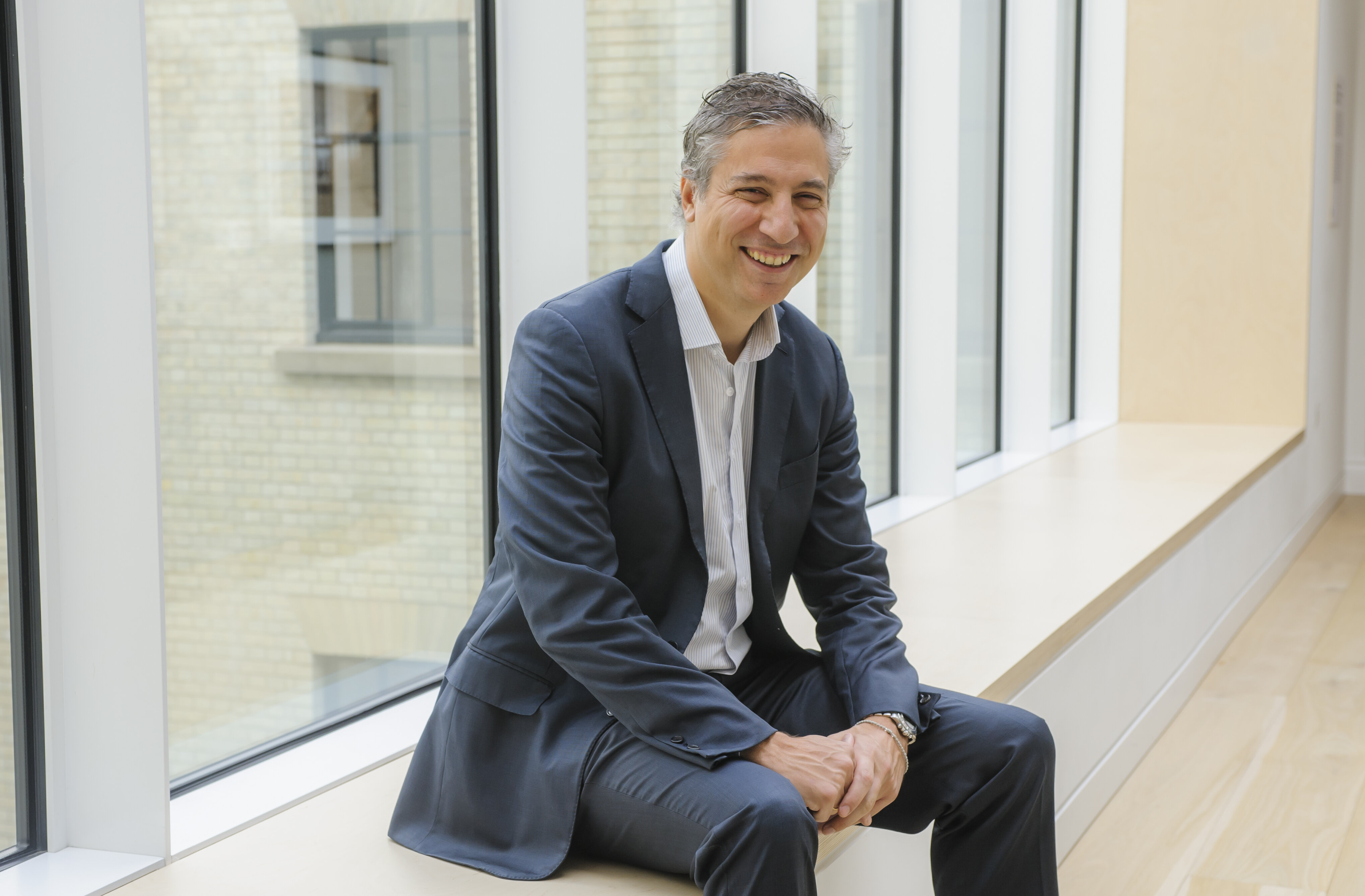
- Born: Athens, Greece
- Known for: Research on political economy, development, and economic history

Academic background
- Education: LL.B., MPA, PhD
- Alma mater: National and Kapodistrian University of Athens; Columbia University; London Business School

Academic work
- Discipline: Political economy, Development economics, International economics
- Institutions: London Business School

Elias Papaioannou FBA is a Greek economist and academic. He is Professor of Economics at London Business School, where he holds the Alexander Knaster Chair, and serves as academic director of the Wheeler Institute for Business and Development. He is a Fellow of the British Academy and a managing co-editor of the Review of Economic Studies.

== Early life and education ==
Papaioannou was born in Athens, Greece. His father, Miltiadis Papaioannou, served as a minister in governments of the Panhellenic Socialist Movement (PASOK).

He received a Bachelor of Laws (LL.B.) from the National and Kapodistrian University of Athens in 1999. In 2001, he completed a Master of Public Administration (MPA) at Columbia University’s School of International and Public Affairs. He earned a PhD in economics from the London Business School in 2005. His doctoral research, supervised by Richard Portes, examined cross-border capital flows and the economic aspects of democratization.

== Academic career ==
Papaioannou began his professional career as an economist in the Financial Research Division of the European Central Bank (ECB) from 2005 to 2007. He joined academia in July 2007 as an assistant professor of economics at Dartmouth College.

From 2010 to 2012, he was a visiting assistant professor in the Department of Economics at Harvard University, where he taught courses in financial economics and political economy. During this period, he collaborated with Alberto Alesina.

In 2012, Papaioannou joined the London Business School (LBS) as an associate professor of economics and was granted tenure in 2014. He was promoted to full professor in 2016 and was appointed to the Alexander Knaster Chair in 2025. He serves as academic director of the Wheeler Institute for Business and Development at LBS.

He has held visiting academic positions at the University of Zurich. During the 2019–2020 academic year, he was the Hal Varian Visiting Professor in the Department of Economics at the Massachusetts Institute of Technology, where he taught doctoral courses on political economy.

Since 2021, Papaioannou has served as a joint managing editor of the Review of Economic Studies. He previously served as an associate editor of Econometrica from 2016 to 2022, as well as the Economic Journal and the Journal of the European Economic Association.

Papaioannou was elected vice-president of the European Economic Association for 2026, president-elect for 2027, and president for 2028.

== Honors and awards ==
- Young Economist Award, European Economic Association (2005)
- Austin Robinson Memorial Prize, Royal Economic Society (2008)
- Young Economist Prize, European Investment Bank Institute (2013)
- Excellence in Refereeing Award, Journal of the European Economic Association (2014)
- European Research Council Consolidator Grant, European Research Council (2018), for research on African economic history
- Innovation in Teaching Award, European Economic Association (2023)
- Fellow of the British Academy (2024)
- Honorary doctorate, University of Patras (2025)
- Responsible Business Education Award, Financial Times (2025)
