= Aggregation (magazine) =

Canadian online magazine (2010–2012)

- November 2010 issue
- Categories: Online magazine
- Frequency: Monthly
- Founder: Gary Campbell
- First issue: November 2010
- Final issue: August 2012
- Country: Canada
- Based in: Toronto
- Language: English
- Website: www.aggregationmagazine.com

Aggregation was a Canadian online magazine published between 2010 and 2012. Each issue collected together stories and trends from five contributors based on hyperlinks they'd discover on the web. It was one of the first Canadian publications designed exclusively for Apple's iPad.

Aggregation was conceived and published by Gary Campbell. It was released online, for free, on the 15th of the month for six consecutive months, from November 2010 to April 2011. After an eight-month hiatus, Campbell announced that a seventh issue was in the works. That issue was eventually published in August 2012 while Campbell was living in New York City. There has been no indication whether more issues are forthcoming.

Each magazine cover featured a unique piece of interactive artwork by Campbell. The publication's design often took advantage of the multimedia nature of tablets by including touch-sensitive and video elements. Each issue's contributors were paid for their work through an honorarium to their charity of choice. Consequently, the publication raised several thousand dollars for Canadian charities far and wide. Other staff involved in the project included Jennifer Campbell, Laura Kathleen Maize and Rani Sheen.

== Awards and honors ==
In a year-end article in Masthead magazine, Canadian Living magazine editor-in-chief Jennifer Reynolds cited Aggregation, alongside other digital magazines The Kit and Covet Garden, as one of the most fascinating moments in Canadian magazine publishing in 2010. Toronto's Eye Weekly included it in a list of required reading, as did Torontoist and numerous other blogs.

Aggregation was a finalist for best tablet magazine at the 2011 Canadian Online Publishing Awards

In 2012, Campbell was invited to speak about the magazine as an example of the changing the media landscape at the Toronto Digifest conference.
