= Job ads aggregator =

Job ads aggregator - also known as search engine for job ads - is a website that aggregates job ads from various job boards, multiposter sites, as well as from direct employers and employment agencies.

Job aggregation market was pioneered by Indeed; the website remains the biggest job ads aggregator, as per Similar Web rankings. However, its incumbent status has been challenged by many competitors. In 2017, Google joined the race when it launched Google for Jobs.

Other example includes SahiSarkariJobs, an Indian website that aggregates government job advertisements and recruitment-related information from multiple sources.
