= Gary Campbell (graphic designer) =

Canadian graphic designer

- Occupation(s): Graphic designer, art director and User experience designer

Gary Campbell is a Canadian graphic designer, art director and user experience expert, known primarily for his design work and advocacy in digital media. His online design and content strategy projects have been nominated for numerous national awards, including Website of the Year.

== Studies and early career ==
Campbell studied Fine Art and East Asian Culture at McMaster University in Hamilton, Ontario, Canada. In 2003, he was hired as art director for Quill & Quire, a magazine of book reviews and publishing industry news. Campbell was tasked with modernizing the brand, which was established in 1935, and is one of Canada's longest-running magazines. He and a team launched the magazine's first web site in early 2004. He then directed the brand's online strategy for eight years, implementing daily blogging, RSS feeds, e-commerce, global commenting, and back-end tools for editorial staff. A 2010 redesign of the site by Campbell and web designer Michelle Darwin was short-listed for both Best Digital Design and Website of the Year at the Canadian Online Publishing Awards (COPAs). At the 2011 COPAs, the site took silver for Website of the Year.

Campbell spearheaded a substantial redesign of Quill & Quire's print publication in 2006, introducing full-colour photography throughout, custom typefaces and a new logo. He changed the publication's trim size for first time in 30 years, reducing it from a tabloid newspaper size (11" x 14") to that of a standard magazine. One of the chief aims of the redesign was to demonstrate to the book and magazine industries the viability of printing on 100% recycled, environmentally friendly paper stock, becoming one of the first magazines in Canada to do so. The debut redesign issue (January 2006) featured contemporary artist and author Douglas Coupland on the cover, reflecting the more modern sensibility inside. The redesign was short-listed for an art direction prize at the Kenneth R. Wilson Awards. Campbell acted as art director for both the print magazine and website for five years before shifting to focus exclusively on digital media.

Throughout 2006 and 2007, he also worked as a photographer and journalist for the newly launched Torontoist website, the Toronto chapter of the Gothamist network of city blogs. Campbell was hired to serve as web creative director and publisher for Toronto Life magazine in 2008, and was tasked with overhauling the online brand after some early missteps.

In November 2010, Campbell published the first of seven issues of Aggregation, an online magazine designed exclusively for Apple's iPad. In each issue, five contributors write about stories and trends based on hyperlinks they'd discover on the web.

== Career after Quill and Quire ==
In 2011, Campbell directed the redesign of Fashionmagazine.com, the online companion for Canada's most-read fashion title. The site subsequently won the silver prize for best digital design at the 2012 Canadian National Magazine Awards. Also in 2011, because of his digital success in the magazine industry, Campbell was named to the board of directors for the Canadian National Magazine Awards Foundation, where he advocated for more recognition of online excellence within the industry.

Campbell introduced the first Twitter Magazine Index, a ranking of Canadian magazines by their Twitter followers as a way to measure their social media reach. Masthead magazine, in an article on the index, noted how publications were traditionally ranked against one another by print circulation or readership, but these numbers can be less relevant to digital players. The index generated significant debate over the value of magazine brands investing in and amassing large social media followings.

Throughout 2012, Campbell provided content strategy and design consulting for the re-launch of SheDoesTheCity.com, a national online-only lifestyle magazine for women. Working alongside founder Jen McNeely and web designer Jimmy Rose, he overhauled the site's editorial vision and design aesthetics. On December 17, 2012, the day of the site's official re-launch, traffic jumped 144%.

In 2013, Campbell moved to Seattle, Washington to work for Amazon.com as a senior UX designer.
