= Capital market imperfections =

Credit market imperfections (known academically as capital market imperfections) are limitations that reduce the range of financial contracts that can be signed or honored. There are three main theoretical drivers of imperfection: First, lenders do not have full information about the borrower, whether they have the capacity to pay back their debt and/or whether they are willing to pay (asymmetric information). Secondly, the lender needs to trust the borrower to commit and to pay back his/her debt, or there needs to be a third party to enforce the contract. Finally, since the exchange does not happen at the same time, there is always room for renegotiation.

== Perfect markets case ==
A theoretically perfect credit market would be conditioned upon the completeness of markets, the perfect rationality of agents, and the comprehensiveness of information. This would produce a condition called Arrow–Debreu equilibrium, which is defined as a set of prices (in this case interest rates) under which demand and supply of the market are equal to each other. Even given the risk of bankruptcy, the resulting optimum choice of the firm will be efficient, as the interest rate is set to accommodate the bankruptcy risk. Therefore, the possibility of borrowers defaulting is not a main driving force that leads to imperfect capital markets. The firm's investment decisions and the borrower's consumption/saving decisions can be analyzed separately (see Fisher separation theorem).

== Asymmetric information ==
The main feature of financial markets that leads to imperfection is theorized as information asymmetry between borrowers and lenders. There are two main types of information asymmetry in capital markets:

- Adverse selection: Adverse selection occurs before the signing of the contract. The lack of information occurs since the lenders do not have information about the type of borrowers, i.e. whether the borrower tends to engage in riskier projects or not. There is a positive correlation between the rate at which lenders select "bad" borrowers as the interest rate increases. This is likely due to a combination of the financial strain of a higher interest rate increasing the difficulty of repaying the loan, and self-selection as financially irresponsible borrowers are not dissuaded from taking on debt by the high interest rates. In adverse selection, the borrower type is only known by the individual and occurs when there are not enough tools to screen the borrower types. One of the examples of screening is offering different types of funds having different interest rates and requiring different amounts of collateral in order to reveal the information about the type of the borrower. If the borrower is a "bad" type, then he/she will choose the type of funds having higher interest rates and requesting lower amount of collateral. However, in the real world there is a wide array of borrower behavior, and no system is known to reliably select for only "good" borrowers.
- Moral hazard: The other type of asymmetric information is moral hazard which arises from the lack of information about the ex-post behavior of the borrower. After signing the contract, the borrower may theoretically select riskier projects due to the combined rapid increase in purchasing power and the need to produce a return on investment to repay the lender. As the interest rate increases, the likelihood of the borrower engaging in more speculative or high-risk projects increases in order to increase the expected return.
- Another possibility stemming from information asymmetry is borrowers engaging in strategic default. Lenders therefore incur some verification cost, which places a burden on the entire system.

== Limited Commitment ==
Another important characteristic that yields imperfection is that exchange does not happen simultaneously. The borrower gets his/her funds, but the lender must rely on the promises of the borrower. One of the conditions for imperfect capital markets is default risk. The borrower may declare bankruptcy, and thus, not repay the debt. Hence, the borrower's promises, as well as the structure of the promises, are very important for the transaction to be realized. One of the options in dealing with the limited commitment problem is providing collateral. The contract is formed such that in case of default, the lender has all/some rights to seize the collateral. in finance, this is called a secured loan. However, it does not fully solve the problem due to the costs associated with seizing the asset, including the money and time required to enforce the contract and liquidate the asset.

Another reason for credit market imperfections associated with limited commitment is the ability of the borrower to renegotiate the terms of the contract ex post. Even though the contract is signed as a secured loan, because of the enforcement costs, the lender never gets the full payment in case of default. Ex post, the borrower always has the option to offer more than the lender would get in case of default, but less than the full payment. That is why the incentive compatibility is needed to ensure binding contracts in imperfect credit markets.

== Relation with incomplete markets ==
The other feature of credit markets leading to imperfections is that credit is not a homogeneous good. It is a different good in different states of world in different times and to different actors. In an idealized "perfect" market, economists expect the market to "achieve every desired exchange for homogeneous goods when there is only one price." Based on that, to have a perfect credit market, every agent may exchange funds at the existing single interest rate for each type of fund. However, in reality, a complete market is impossible.

== Consequences of imperfections in credit markets ==
With perfect information as the interest rate increases, expected return to the lender increases as the lender charges the borrower more for the lending service. However, with imperfect information there is also an indirect opposite effect. As the interest rate rises, the possibility of selecting riskier borrowers increases as the cost increases less for them as they may not pay it back. Hence, as the interest rate goes up, the return to the lender decreases only considering the adverse selection effect. Considering these two opposite effects, the lender may determine the interest rate to maximize the rate of return so it does not necessarily clear the market. In that situation, some individuals can not obtain any credit at the existing market interest rate although they are willingly to pay the market value. Hence, we see credit rationing as a result of imperfection in credit markets.

Credit rationing is not just caused from asymmetric information but also from limited enforcement in case of default. There are also costs used for law enforcement in order to get back the funds and in most of the case there is also possibility of not taking back at all if it was an unsecured loan. The problem of credit rationing arises most if the creditor does not have anything to provide as collateral. Even if he/she is a trustworthy person and would use the funds for good investment project and able to pay back his/her debt, the lender may not lend him/her so it leads to inefficient allocation of resources.

In macroeconomic perspective one of the consequences of the imperfect credit markets is insufficient investment. Since most of the time firms finance their investment from credit markets, lack of supply of funds leads to insufficient amount of investment causing inefficient allocation of funds in the economy. Even though it was true that every agent could borrow at the amount they were willing to, we could not have reached the efficient allocation because of the high market interest rate causing from the cost of screening and monitoring of the banks.

Based on the fact that in real world the credit markets are far from being perfect, we can clearly say that market clearing is a very specific result which may not hold in general.

== Imperfections in international credit markets ==
Enforcement of the contract is particularly difficult in an international set up. It is hard for a creditor to impose sanctions to a country that defaults. Hence, it is a much deeper problem considering the consequences of imperfections in international credit markets. It may highly reduce the country's ability to extract financial resources on international basis. the most fundamental reason is the sovereign risk that causes from the lack of a supranational legal authority, capable of enforcing contracts across borders. The main results of imperfect international credit markets are similar to domestic ones: risk and insufficient level of investment. Since the inefficiency of the economy in terms of investment is also related to the economic growth of the country, the consequences on investment and economic growth are more severe and affects the economies of the countries (especially developing countries) in macro level.
