= Growth elasticity of poverty =

Growth elasticity of poverty (GEP) is the percentage reduction in poverty rates associated with a percentage change in mean (per capita) income.

Mathematically;

$$\mathrm{GEP}=-\frac {\%d\mathrm{PR}} {\%dy} \,$$

where PR is a poverty measure and y is per capita income. Generally, increases in per capita income tend to decrease the poverty rate, hence the elasticity is positive.

Standard estimates of GEP for developing countries range from 1.5 to 5, with an average estimate of around 3. This implies that a 1% increase in per capita income is associated with a 3% decrease in the poverty rate (proportion of people living on less than $1 per day). This implies that economic growth is fundamental to reducing poverty rates, particularly in low income countries.

However, the GEP also depends on other variables, among them the initial level of income inequality. Countries with a more equal distribution of income (as measured for example by the Gini index) experience a greater reduction in the poverty rate for a given increase in per capita income. The GEP ranges from slightly less than 1 for very unequal countries, to as high as 6 for very equal countries. This suggests that in poor countries that also have a very unequal distribution of income, economic reforms aimed at reducing inequality may be a prerequisite for pro-growth policies to make a substantial impact on poverty levels. On the other hand, for poor countries which already have an equitable distribution of income, pro growth policies should be the main poverty fighting tools (even if they increase inequality).
