= Aggregate Spend =

Aggregate Spend is the process used in the United States to aggregate and monitor the total amount spent by healthcare manufacturers on individual healthcare professionals and organizations (HCP/O) through payments, gifts, honoraria, travel and other means. Also often referred to as the Physician Payments Sunshine Act, this initiative is a growing body of federal and state legislations intended to collectively address all or some of the following goals:

(a) Provide transparency with regard to who, in the life sciences industry, is contributing what benefits to which physician;
(b) Mandate statutory reports at least once a year; and,
(c) Limit spend per physician.

Organizations monitored include pharmaceutical, biotechnology and, in some states, medical device organizations.

== U.S. federal laws ==
On September 6, 2007, Senator Chuck Grassley (R-Iowa) introduced the Physician Payments Sunshine Act of 2007 (S. 2029). In March 2008, Rep. Peter DeFazio (D-Oregon) and Rep. Pete Stark (D-California) introduced a slightly different companion bill in the House of Representatives. (H.R. 5605). These bills were reintroduced in 111th Congress as the Physician Payments Sunshine Act of 2009 (S. 301 and H.R. 3138), again by Senator Chuck Grassley and in the House of Representatives by Rep. Baron Hill (D-Indiana). The bills all aimed to replace the differing state legislations with a single law, common to all 50 states. According to Ashley Glacel, the press secretary for the Senate Aging Committee, whose chairman, Herb Kohl, co-sponsored the bill, the Senate bill is more expansive because it also include Medical Device makers.

The bills would amend the Social Security Act "to provide for transparency in the relationship between physicians and manufacturers of drugs, devices, or medical supplies for which payment is made under Medicare, Medicaid, or SCHIP." The bill proposed that each quarter, beginning on January 1, 2008, companies or their agents which manufacture drugs, medical devices, or medical supplies would be required to disclose all payments over $25 in value made "to a physician, or to an entity that a physician is employed by, has tenure with, or has an ownership interest in".

The bill would also require manufacturers to provide details on the date, value and nature of the payment, such as whether it was for "food, entertainment, or gifts", "trips or travel", "a product or other item provided for less than market value", "participation in a medical conference, continuing medical education, or other educational or informational program or seminar, provision of materials related to such a conference or educational or informational program or seminar, or remuneration for promoting or participating in such a conference or educational or informational program or seminar", "product rebates or discounts", "consulting fees or honoraria" or "any other economic benefit". Companies would be required to submit a summary report in electronic format. The proposed penalties for breaches were "not less than $10,000, but not more than $100,000", for each such failure.

The proposed federal law would undermine a stronger Vermont law if passed, according to state officials and advocacy groups. The reporting threshold under the proposed federal law is $500 - much higher than the $25 threshold found in a similar Vermont law passed five years ago. If passed, the federal bill would preempt the state law.

In May 2008, the Pharmaceutical Research and Manufacturers of America stated that they supported a revised version of the bill, but only on condition of "the continued inclusion of the provision that preempts state law". In a media statement, the PhRMA president, Billy Tauzin, stated that "PhRMA believes that preempting local and state marketing reporting or disclosure laws that have been enacted or are pending avoids a confusing myriad of local, state and federal requirements that confuse patients accessing the information and are overly burdensome and costly for those required to report."

== PPACA ==
The federal bill was finally passed on March 21, 2010, as a provision under the Patient Protection and Affordable Care (PPAC) Act (https://www.cms.gov/LegislativeUpdate/downloads/PPACA.pdf), and several states — including California, Massachusetts, Minnesota, Maine, District of Columbia, West Virginia, Vermont and Nevada — have already passed their versions of the Sunshine Law. The federal law was due to go into effect from January 1, 2012, with the earliest reports (covering January - December 2012) mandated on or before March 31, 2013. The penalties range from $10,000 to $100,000 for each violation, and can go up to $1 million.

In February 2013 the planned dates for implementation were changed to: earliest reports to cover August - December 2013; submission by March 31, 2014.

In February 2014 CMS (The Centers for Medicare & Medicaid Services) advised the planned submission dates and what would be submitted were changed. In essence this was because the required registration process, for those who would submit data and attest to the accuracy of that data, was not ready for use, nor were the supporting systems, people and processes for receiving the data

On February 18, Open Payments registration and data submission for applicable manufacturers and applicable GPOs opened with a two-phased approach for the first reporting year of the new program: Phase 1 (February 18 through March 31) includes user registration in CMS’ Enterprise Portal (the gateway to CMS’ Enterprise Identity Management system (EIDM)) and submission of corporate profile information and summary aggregate 2013 (August - December) payment data. Phase 2 (begins in May and extends for no fewer than 30 days) includes industry registration in the Open Payments system, submission of detailed 2013( August - December) payment data, and legal attestation to the accuracy of the data.

After Phase 2 submission is complete, physicians and teaching hospitals will have the opportunity to register with OpenPayments and view the transactions reported under their name, prior to it being made available to the public. During this review period, any reported transactions may be disputed by the recipient. If a transfer of value is disputed, it will still be publicized, but remain flagged as disputed, until the dispute has been resolved.

== U.S. State Laws ==
Aggregate Spend compliance has been affected by individual state law compliance, which requires healthcare manufacturers to address and collect distinct spend types to comply with disclosure requirements at the HCP/O aggregate level. Minnesota, West Virginia, Vermont, California, Nevada, and Washington D.C. all have some type of gift-giving limit or disclosure law. Starting in July 2009, Massachusetts and Vermont Gift Ban Law became active with bans of $5,000 and $10,000 per violation respectively. Other states are evaluating similar options as well.

== See also ==
- Bad Pharma (2012) by Ben Goldacre
