= Unified growth theory =

Theory of economic growth

Unified growth theory, founded by Oded Galor, explores the evolution of societies across the entire span of human history.

The theory suggests that forces operating in the distant past have shaped the growth process and determined the differential timing of transitions from stagnation to growth across the globe. For most of human history, technological progress expanded population size but had little effect on living standards. As technological progress gradually gathered momentum, through the mutually reinforcing interaction between population growth, adaptation, and innovation, the increasing importance of human capital in coping with a rapidly changing technological environment prompted parents to prioritize child quality over quantity, triggering the onset of the demographic transition. The decline in fertility freed the growth process from the counterbalancing effects of population growth and, along with advancements in knowledge and education, laid the foundation for sustained economic expansion and modern prosperity.

Yet, variations in deeply rooted institutional, cultural, geographical, and human diversity characteristics contributed to the differential timing of this transformation across societies, giving rise to immense global inequality.

== The dual mysteries of growth and inequality ==
The passage of humanity from millennia of stagnation to an age of sustained economic progress represents a defining turning point in the course of human civilization. After millennia of stagnant living standards across the world, the past two centuries have witnessed a momentous transformation: income per person has risen nearly fourteen-fold, while life expectancy has more than doubled. Yet as prosperity accelerated, it emerged earlier in some regions than in others, marking a second defining transformation that brought about profound inequality among societies. Western European nations and some of their offshoots in the New World underwent extraordinary gains in living standards during the nineteenth century, whereas in most other parts of the world this takeoff occurred only in the latter half of the twentieth century, contributing to wide disparities across regions.

Unified Growth Theory seeks to explain the factors underlying the significant rise in living standards that followed centuries of relative economic stagnation, as well as the origins of the persistent disparities in income and development across nations and regions in the modern era.

== Testable predictions ==
The testable predictions of the theory and its underlying mechanisms have been confirmed in empirical and quantitative research in the past decade, and have inspired intensive exploration of the impact of historical and pre-historical forces on comparative economic development and the disparity in the wealth of nations. the theory as a whole was explored quantitatively. Traits that were complementary to the technological environment generated higher level of income, and therefore higher reproductive success. Testable predictions of this evolutionary theory and its underlying mechanisms have been confirmed empirically and quantitatively.

== See also ==
- Malthusianism
- Oded Galor
- Unified Growth Theory (book)
