= Oded Galor =

Israeli-American economist (born 1953)

- עודד גלאור
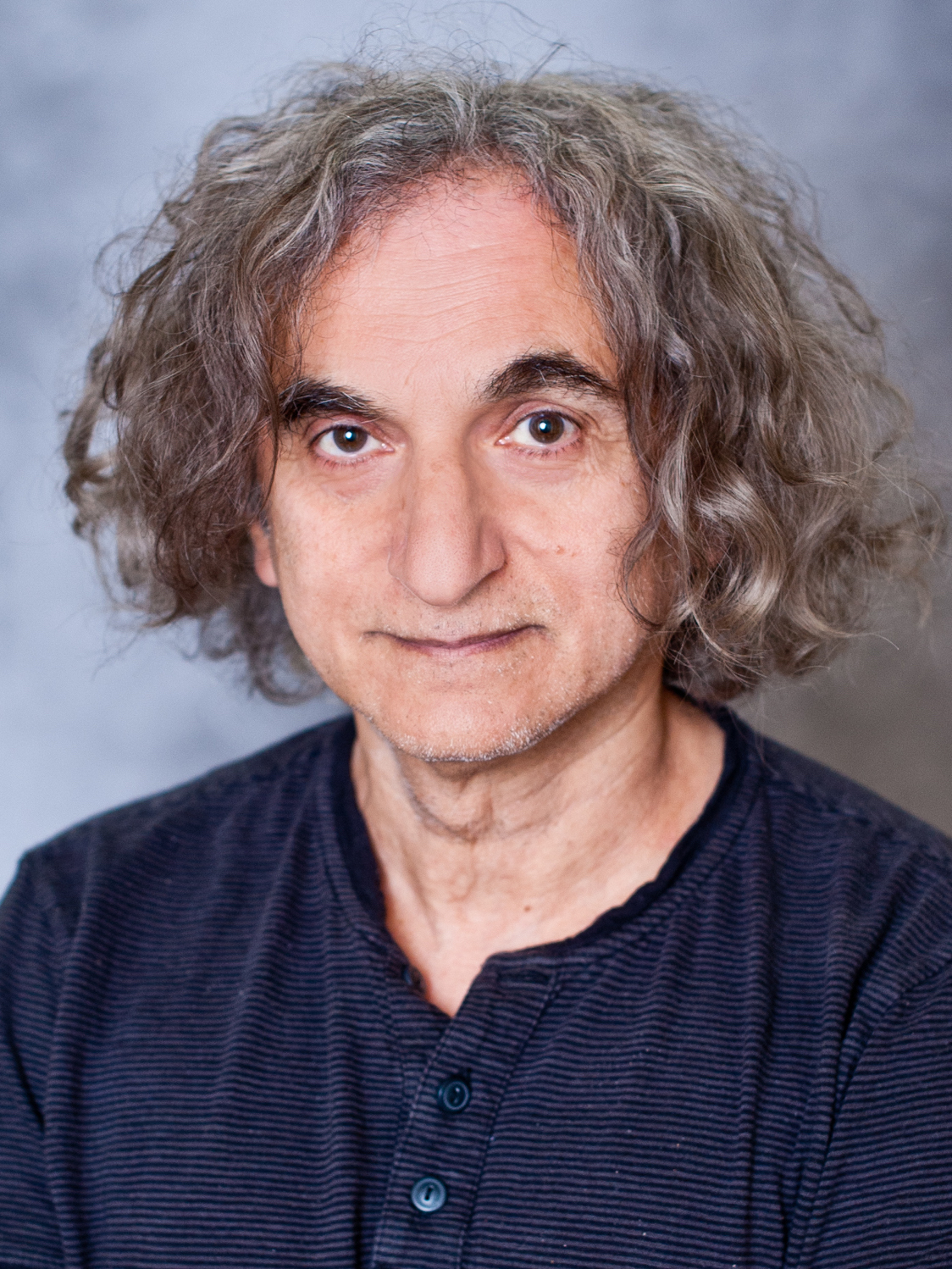
- Born: 1953 (age 72–73)

Academic background
- Education: Columbia University (PhD, 1984); Hebrew University of Jerusalem (BA, 1978, MA, 1980)

Academic work
- Discipline: Economic Growth; Comparative Economic Development; Evolutionary Economics
- Institutions: Brown University
- Notable ideas: Unified growth theory
- Awards: Doctor Honoris Causa of Poznan University of Economics and Business (Poland) Doctor Honoris Causa of Université catholique de Louvain (Belgium) Doctor Honoris Causa of The Athens University of Economics and Business (Greece) Doctorate Honoris Causa of Nicolaus Copernicus University (Poland)
- Website: www.odedgalor.com

Oded Galor (Hebrew: עודד גלאור; born 1953) is an Israeli-American economist who is currently Herbert H. Goldberger Professor of Economics at Brown University. He is the founder of unified growth theory.

== Career ==
Galor completed his BA and MA at the Hebrew University of Jerusalem and his PhD at Columbia University. He served as a Chilewich Professor of Economics at the Hebrew University, and he is currently the Herbert H. Goldberger Professor of Economics at Brown University.

He was awarded Doctorate Honoris Causa from Nicolaus Copernicus University, Athens University of Economic and Business (AUEB), UCLouvain, and Poznań University of Economics & Business. He is an Elected Foreign Member of Academia Europaea (honoris causa), and an Elected Fellow of the Econometric Society. He has led the NBER research group on Income Distribution and Macroeconomics and he is a Research Fellow of the CEPR and IZA, a Research Associate of the NBER and CESifo, a Sackler Fellow at Tel-Aviv University, a Fellow of the Economics Department at the Hebrew University. Furthermore, he is the editor in chief of the Journal of Economic Growth, editor of the Journal of Population Economics, co-editor of Macroeconomic Dynamics. He was recently among the 5 candidates for the Nobel of Frankfurter Allgemeine.

== Research ==
Oded Galor is the founder of unified growth theory, which explores the process of development over the entire course of human history and identifies the historical and prehistorical forces behind the differential transition timing from stagnation to growth and the divergence in income per capita across countries and regions.

He is a co-author of the Galor–Zeira model—the first macroeconomic model to explore the role of heterogeneity in the determination of macroeconomic behavior. In contrast to the representative agent approach that dominated the field of macroeconomics until the early 1990s and argued that heterogeneity has no impact on macroeconomic activity, the model demonstrates that in the presence of capital markets imperfections and local non-convexities in the production of human capital, income distribution affects the long run level of income per-capita as well as the growth process. The Review of Economic Studies named the paper among the 11 most path-breaking papers published in the journal in the past 60 years.

=== Other notable contribution ===
Galor and his colleagues have used evolutionary approach in order to explain the origins of more particular elements of economic and social behavior.

- Using the genealogical record of half a million people in Quebec during the period 1608–1800, it was suggested that moderate fertility, and hence the tendency towards investment in child quality, was beneficial for the long-run reproductive success, reflecting the quality-quantity tradeoff observed and discussed in earlier works.
- A natural experiment regarding the expansion of the New World crops into the Old World and vice versa during the Columbian exchange led to the conclusion that beneficial pre-industrial agro-climatic characteristics may have positively affected the formation of a future-oriented mindset in corresponding contemporary societies.
- Key concepts related to behavioural economics, such as risk aversion and loss aversion, were also studied through evolutionary lenses. Galor and Savitsky (2018) provided empirical evidence that the intensity of loss aversion may be correlated with historical exposure to climatic shocks and their effects on reproductive success, with greater climatic volatility in some regions leading to more loss-neutrality among contemporary individuals and ethnic groups originating from there. As for risk aversion, Galor and Michalopoulos (2012) suggested there was a reversal in the course of human history, with risk-tolerance presenting an evolutionary advantage during early stages of development by promoting technological advancements, and with risk-aversion being an advantage during later stages, when risk-tolerant individuals channel less resources towards children and natural selection favours risk-averse individuals.

== Books ==
=== Discrete Dynamical Systems (Springer, 2010) ===
This book provides an introduction to discrete dynamical systems—a framework of analysis commonly used in the fields of biology, demography, ecology, economics, engineering, finance, and physics. The book characterizes the fundamental factors that govern the qualitative and quantitative trajectories of a variety of deterministic, discrete dynamical systems, providing solution methods for systems that can be solved analytically and methods of qualitative analysis for systems that do not permit or necessitate an explicit solution. The analysis focuses initially on the characterization of the factors the govern the evolution of state variables in the elementary context of one-dimensional, first-order, linear, autonomous systems. The fundamental insights about the forces that affect the evolution of these elementary systems are subsequently generalized, and the determinants of the trajectory of multi-dimensional, nonlinear, higher-order, non-autonomous dynamical systems are established.

=== Unified Growth Theory (Princeton University Press, 2011) ===
Backdrop

Throughout most of human existence, economic growth has been all but absent across the globe. But two centuries ago, some regions of the world began to emerge from this epoch of economic stagnation into a period of sustained economic growth, profoundly altering the level and distribution of wealth and health around the world. In his book Unified Growth Theory, Galor provides a global theory explaining what has triggered this remarkable transformation in human history.

Reception

Robert Solow described Galor's project as "breathtakingly ambitious". He added that "Galor proposes a fairly simple, intensely human-capital-oriented model that will accommodate the millennia of Malthusian near-stagnation, the Industrial Revolution and its aftermath of rapid growth, the accompanying demographic transition, and the emergence of modern human-capital-based growth. And the model is supposed to generate endogenously the transitions from one era to the next. The resulting book is a powerful mixture of fact, theory, and interpretation."

According to Daron Acemoglu, "Unified Growth Theory is a work of unusual ambition" that "will inspire, motivate, and challenge economists".

Steven N. Durlauf declared that "Unified Growth Theory is Big Science at its best. It grapples with some of the broadest questions in social science, integrating state-of-the-art economic theory with a rich exploration of a wide range of empirical evidence." He considers that Galor's ideas "will have a lasting effect on economics".

=== The Journey of Humanity: The Origins of Growth and Inequality (Penguin Random House, 2022) ===
In The Journey of Humanity, Galor wrote a book which wraps his life's studies into one volume, this time intended for a popular audience.
