= Aggregate income =

All incomes in an economy

Aggregate income is the total of all incomes in an economy without adjustments for inflation, taxation, or types of double counting. Aggregate income is a form of GDP that is equal to Consumption expenditure plus net profits. 'Aggregate income' in economics is a broad conceptual term. It may express the proceeds from total output in the economy for producers of that output. There are a number of ways to measure aggregate income, but GDP is one of the best known and most widely used.

== Measurement using GDP ==
GDP stands for gross domestic product. GDP is a measure of the economic output of a country. It is usually defined as the total market value of goods and services produced within a given period after deducting the cost of goods and services used up in the process of production, but before allowances for depreciation. Most countries compile estimates of their GDP based on guidelines from the United Nations.

GDP (Y) is the sum of consumption (C), investment (I), government spending (G) and net exports (X – M).

Y = C + I + G + (X − M)

Here is a description of each GDP component:

C (consumption) is normally the largest GDP component in the economy, consisting of private (household final consumption expenditure) in the economy. These personal expenditures fall under one of the following categories: durable goods, non-durable goods, and services. Examples include food, rent, jewelry, gasoline, and medical expenses but does not include the purchase of new housing.

I (investment) includes, for instance, business investment in equipment, but does not include exchanges of existing assets. Examples include construction of a new mine, purchase of software, or purchase of machinery and equipment for a factory. Spending by households (not government) on new houses is also included in investment. In contrast to its colloquial meaning, "investment" in GDP does not mean purchases of financial products. Buying financial products is classed as 'saving', as opposed to investment. This avoids double-counting: if one buys shares in a company, and the company uses the money received to buy plant, equipment, etc., the amount will be counted toward GDP when the company spends the money on those things; to also count it when one gives it to the company would be to count two times an amount that only corresponds to one group of products. Buying bonds or company shares is a swapping of deeds, a transfer of claims on future production, not directly an expenditure on products.

G (government spending) is the sum of government expenditures on final goods and services. It includes salaries of public servants, purchases of weapons for the military and any investment expenditure by a government. It does not include any transfer payments, such as social security or unemployment benefits.

X (exports) represents gross exports. GDP captures the amount a country produces, including goods and services produced for other nations' consumption, therefore exports are added.

M (imports) represents gross imports. Imports are subtracted since imported goods will be included in the terms G, I, or C, and must be deducted to avoid counting foreign supply as domestic.

== Components ==
There are a number of different variables that go into determining aggregate income. Those variables include:

Employee income: Combined incomes of all employees in a nation before any taxes are taken from that income.

Business owner income: Income that is earned by business owners through the operation of their businesses.

Rental income: Income that is earned by real estate owners who charge rent for the use of their properties.

Corporate income: Income that is earned by corporations.

Interest income: Income that is earned through the payment of interest on invested funds.

Government income: Income earned by the government of a country.

Government subsidies: Money that the government pays to employees, business owners, real estate owners, corporations and interest earners.

== Calculation ==
Aggregate income is gross income, and the term generally refers to the combined incomes of a couple filing a joint tax return. It includes income from all sources. Now that we know which variables are needed to determine aggregate income, we will look at the formula for its calculation. First, let's assign some abbreviations to the variables that were discussed.

E = Employee income

B = Business owner income

R = Rental income

C = Corporate income

I = Interest income

G = Government income

S = Government subsidies

The formula to determine aggregate income is as follows:

Aggregate Income = E + B + R + C + I + ( G - S )

Notice that government subsidies are subtracted from government income before all of the sum of the other factors is determined.

== Advantages ==
For households, determining the amount of aggregate income generated over the course of a calendar year can be advantageous when calculating the total taxes due for that period. In a number of nations, federal tax agencies provide some incentives for spouses to file joint tax returns, rather than each spouse filing separately. By choosing to aggregate their generated income for the tax period, the household is likely to owe fewer taxes and thus receive a higher joint return than they would have received with individual returns.

Businesses can also benefit from the aggregate income model when calculating expenses of various types. This is especially true when planning budgets for various departments. Along with identifying the individual salaries and wages of current employees, the department can also incorporate resources into the budget plan that allow for granting cost of living increases, merit increases, and possibly adding additional personnel during the budget period. Considering the aggregate income projected for the upcoming operational year allows the business to plan in a manner that ensures it is possible to maintain the right balance in the workforce, while still remaining within budget.

Aggregate income is also important to the calculation of the Gross Domestic Product or GDP of a country. Generally, this figure is calculated without allowing for income from taxes or adjusting the figures for inflation that occurs during the period under consideration. Calculating the cumulative income of all the entities involved makes it easier to identify true GDP with more accuracy, and thus allow lawmakers to be in a better position to enact legislation that will help make it easier to reach and maintain a balanced budget.

The key function of aggregate income is for the specified group to accurately understand how much income is generated during the identified period of time. This in turn creates the basis for identifying ways to make use of that income so that the highest degree of satisfaction is realized from the efforts used to generate that income. This simple principle of distribution economics helps to create sound financial bases that prepare the group for the future, and make it possible to obtain goals that would have been difficult to achieve if the approach were to consider individual incomes only.

== See also ==
- Distribution (economics)
- Household income in the United States
- Gross domestic product
- Aggregate demand
- Inflation

== See also ==
- Performance Reporting under IFRS by Peter Casson
- Creating a Balance Sheet
- Passive Portfolio Management and Fixed-Income Investing by Andrew Ainsworth
