= Progressive tax =

Higher tax on richer sources

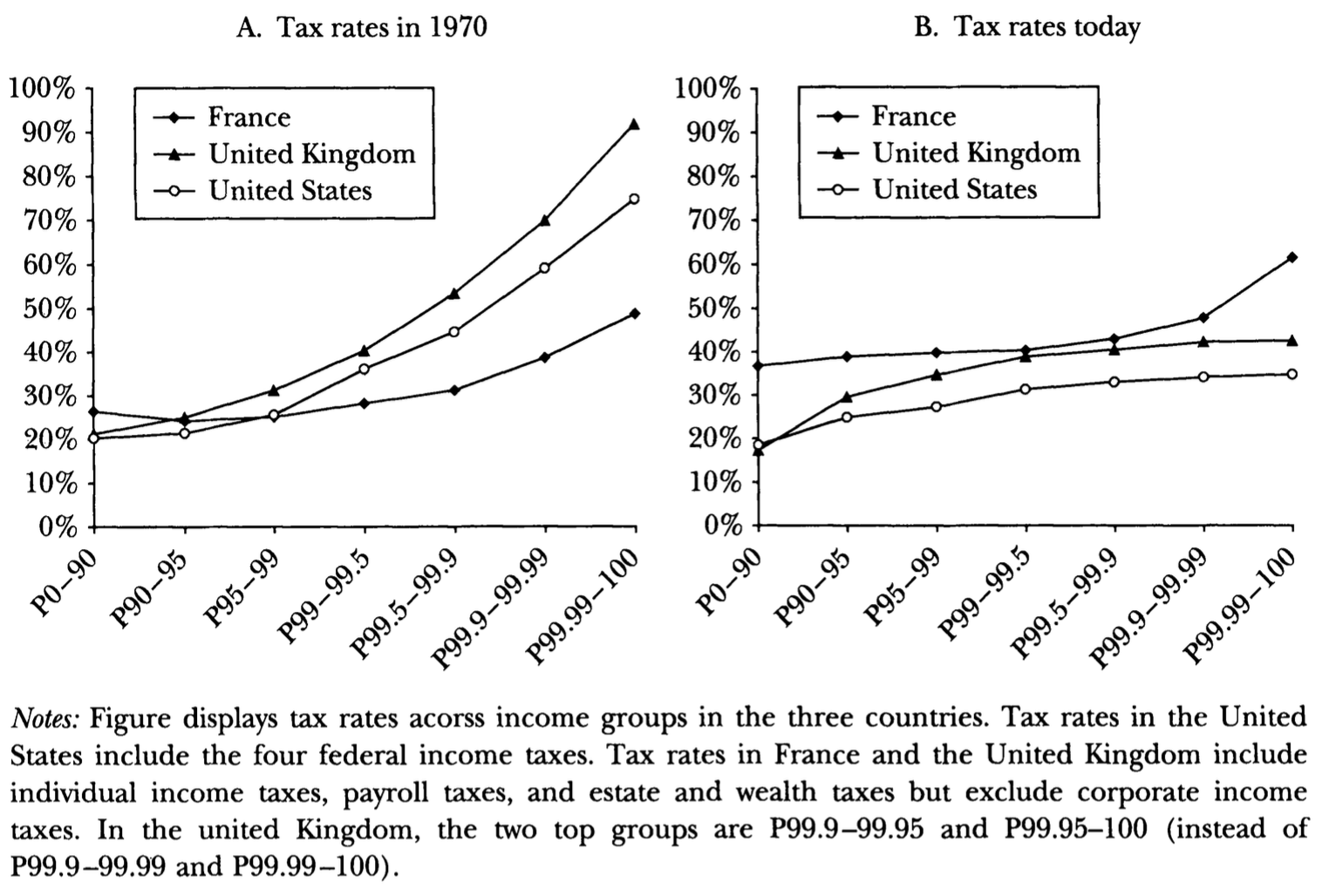
Rough estimation of average tax rates by income groups in France, the United Kingdom, and the United States, 1970 (left) and 2005 (right). It implies that in these respective countries, taxes were more progressive in 1970 than in 2005.

A progressive tax is a tax in which the tax rate increases as the taxable amount increases. The term progressive refers to the way the tax rate progresses from low to high, with the result that a taxpayer's average tax rate is less than the person's marginal tax rate. The term can be applied to individual taxes or to a tax system as a whole. Progressive taxes are imposed in an attempt to reduce the tax incidence on people with a lower ability to pay, as such taxes shift the incidence increasingly onto those with a higher ability to pay. The opposite of a progressive tax is a regressive tax, such as a sales tax or tariffs, where the poor pay a larger proportion of their income compared to the rich despite paying the same amount (for example, spending on groceries and food staples varies little against income, so the poor pay similar to the rich even while latter has much higher income).

The term is frequently applied to personal income taxes, in which people with lower income pay a lower percentage of their income in tax than those with higher income. It can also apply to adjustments to the tax base through tax exemptions, tax credits, or selective taxation that create progressive distributional effects. For example, a wealth or property tax, a sales tax on luxury goods, or the exemption of sales taxes on necessities, may be described as having progressive effects as it increases the tax burden of higher income families and reduces it on lower income families.

Progressive taxation is often suggested as a way to mitigate the societal ills associated with higher income inequality, as the tax structure reduces inequality; economists disagree on the tax policy's economic and long-term effects. One study suggests progressive taxation is positively associated with subjective well-being, while overall tax rates and government spending are not.

== Early examples ==
In the early days of the Roman Republic, public taxes consisted of assessments on owned wealth and property. For Roman citizens, the tax rate under normal circumstances was 1% of property value and could sometimes rise to 3% in situations such as war. These taxes were levied against land, homes, and other real estate, enslaved people, animals, personal items, and monetary wealth. By 167 BC, Rome no longer needed to levy a tax against its citizens in the Italian peninsula, due to the riches acquired from conquered provinces. After considerable Roman expansion in the 1st century, Augustus Caesar introduced a wealth tax of about 1% and a flat poll tax on each adult; this made the tax system less progressive, as it no longer only taxed wealth. In India, under the Mughal Empire, the Dahsala system was introduced in A.D. 1580 under the reign of Akbar. This system was introduced by Akbar's finance minister, Raja Todar Mal, who was appointed in A.D. 1573 in Gujarat. The Dahsala system is a land-revenue system (system of taxation) which helped to organise the collecting system based on land fertility.

=== Modern era ===
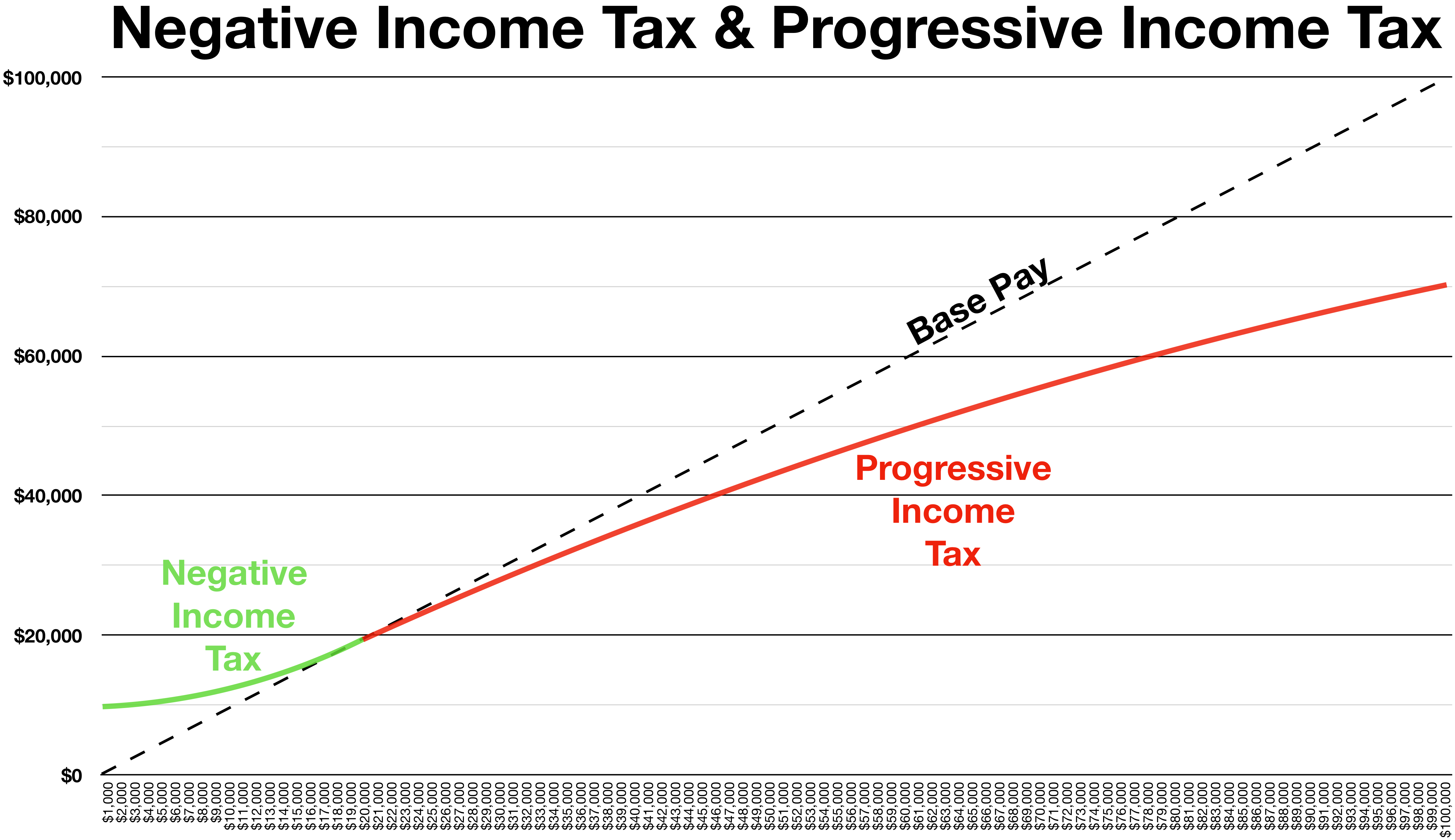
Negative income tax

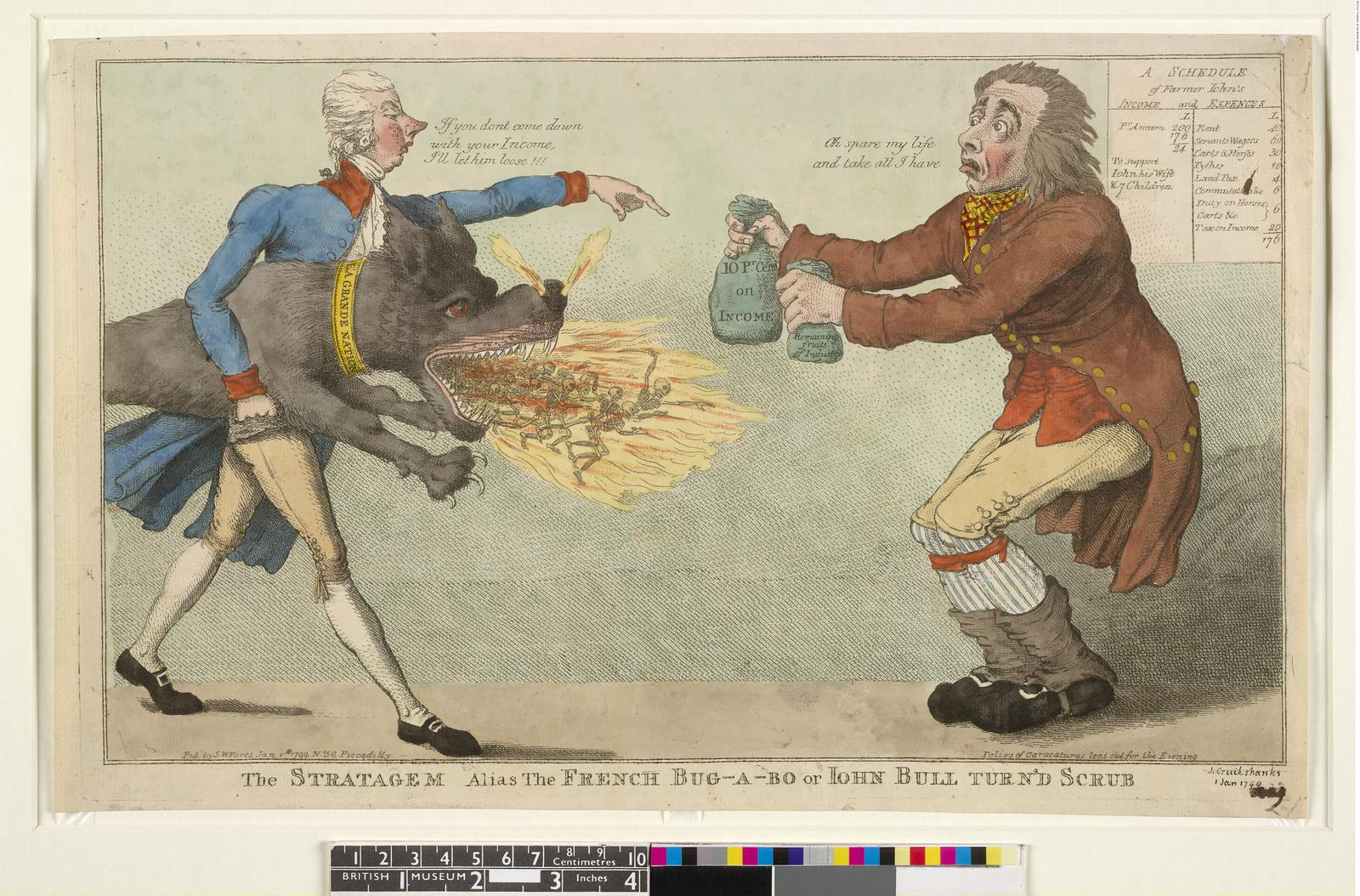
A caricature of William Pitt the Younger collecting the newly introduced income tax

The first modern income tax was introduced in Great Britain by Prime Minister William Pitt the Younger in his budget of December 1798, to pay for weapons and equipment for the French Revolutionary War. Pitt's new graduated (progressive) income tax began at a levy of 2 old pence in the pound (1/120 or 0.83%) on annual incomes over £60 and increased up to a maximum of 2 shillings (10%) on incomes of over £200. Pitt hoped that the new income tax would raise £10 million, but actual receipts for 1799 totalled just over £6 million.

Pitt's progressive income tax was levied from 1799 to 1802, when it was abolished by Henry Addington during the Peace of Amiens. Addington had taken over as prime minister in 1801, after Pitt's resignation over Catholic emancipation. The income tax was reintroduced by Addington in 1803 when hostilities recommenced, but it was again abolished in 1816, one year after the Battle of Waterloo.

The present form of income tax in the United Kingdom was reintroduced by Sir Robert Peel in the Income Tax Act 1842. Peel, as a Conservative, had opposed income tax in the 1841 general election, but a growing budget deficit required a new source of funds. The new income tax, based on Addington's model, was imposed on incomes above £150. Although this measure was initially intended to be temporary, it soon became a fixture of the British taxation system. A committee was formed in 1851 under Joseph Hume to investigate the matter, but failed to reach a clear recommendation. Despite the vociferous objection, William Gladstone, Chancellor of the Exchequer from 1852, kept the progressive income tax, and extended it to cover the costs of the Crimean War. By the 1860s, the progressive tax had become a grudgingly accepted element of the English fiscal system.

In the United States, the first progressive income tax was established by the Revenue Act of 1862. The act was signed into law by President Abraham Lincoln, and replaced the Revenue Act of 1861, which had imposed a flat income tax of 3% on annual incomes above $800. The Sixteenth Amendment to the United States Constitution, adopted in 1913, permitted Congress to levy all income taxes without any apportionment requirement. By the mid-20th century, most countries had implemented some form of progressive income tax.

Both Karl Marx and Friedrich Engels supported a progressive income tax.

=== Negative Income Tax ===
The idea of Negative Income Tax (NIT) was stumbled upon and discussed by various thinkers and is most commonly attributed to Milton Friedman, who made it more prominent in his 1962 work 'Capitalism and Freedom'. The theory positions itself as an alternative to contemporary progressive tax systems, which are deemed too bureaucratic and inefficient; it emphasizes its lower administrative costs and a unitary system of providing welfare and support without discrediting beneficiaries. It also eliminates unnecessary processes and institutions by directly providing to the substandard.

NIT is a system in which the flow of tax payments is inverted for salaries below a specified threshold; individuals earning above the threshold must pay taxes to the state, while those below receive those funds. Theoretical frameworks of this idea could be referred back to William Petty, Vilfredo Pareto, and Paul Samuelson, among others.

The system's ability to adjust subsidies for poor households eliminates the welfare trap issue faced by other proposals (e.g., means testing). The 'wage subsidy' is best illustrated by the gap between one's salary or base pay and one's real income after the subsidy is applied. Once the government-defined minimum criteria are met, the recipient becomes the payer.

Friedman provides five other advantages of NIT. It allows households and families to sustain themselves directly from their income, without relying on other programs or plans. Secondly, it provides cash to the recipient, which is perceived as the most superior means of support. Thirdly, Friedman claims that a negative income tax could replace all other supporting programs and work as the universal program on its own. Fourthly, lower administration costs associated with NIT compared to other systems. Lastly, it should not, in theory, interfere with market mechanisms, unlike other government interventionist laws (i.e., minimum wage).

A survey conducted in 1995 established that the majority of American economists advocated for the addition of a negative income tax into the welfare system. The United States federal government took a key interest on the matter and between 1968 and 1982 sponsored four experiments across various states to see the effects of NIT on labor supply, income, and substitution effects. As a result, most participants reduced their labor supply, especially youth, by as much as four weeks. These responses may seem imminent from a generous system like NIT.

NIT was widely used under President Nixon's Family Assistance Plan in 1969. It was also implemented in 1975 for the working poor through the earned income tax credit. The system is still in power today, but differs from the original theories of Friedman and his supporters.

== Measuring progressivity ==
Indices such as the Suits index, Gini coefficient, Kakwani index, Theil index, Atkinson index, and Hoover index have been created to measure the progressivity of taxation, using measures derived from income distribution and wealth distribution.

=== Marginal and effective tax rates ===
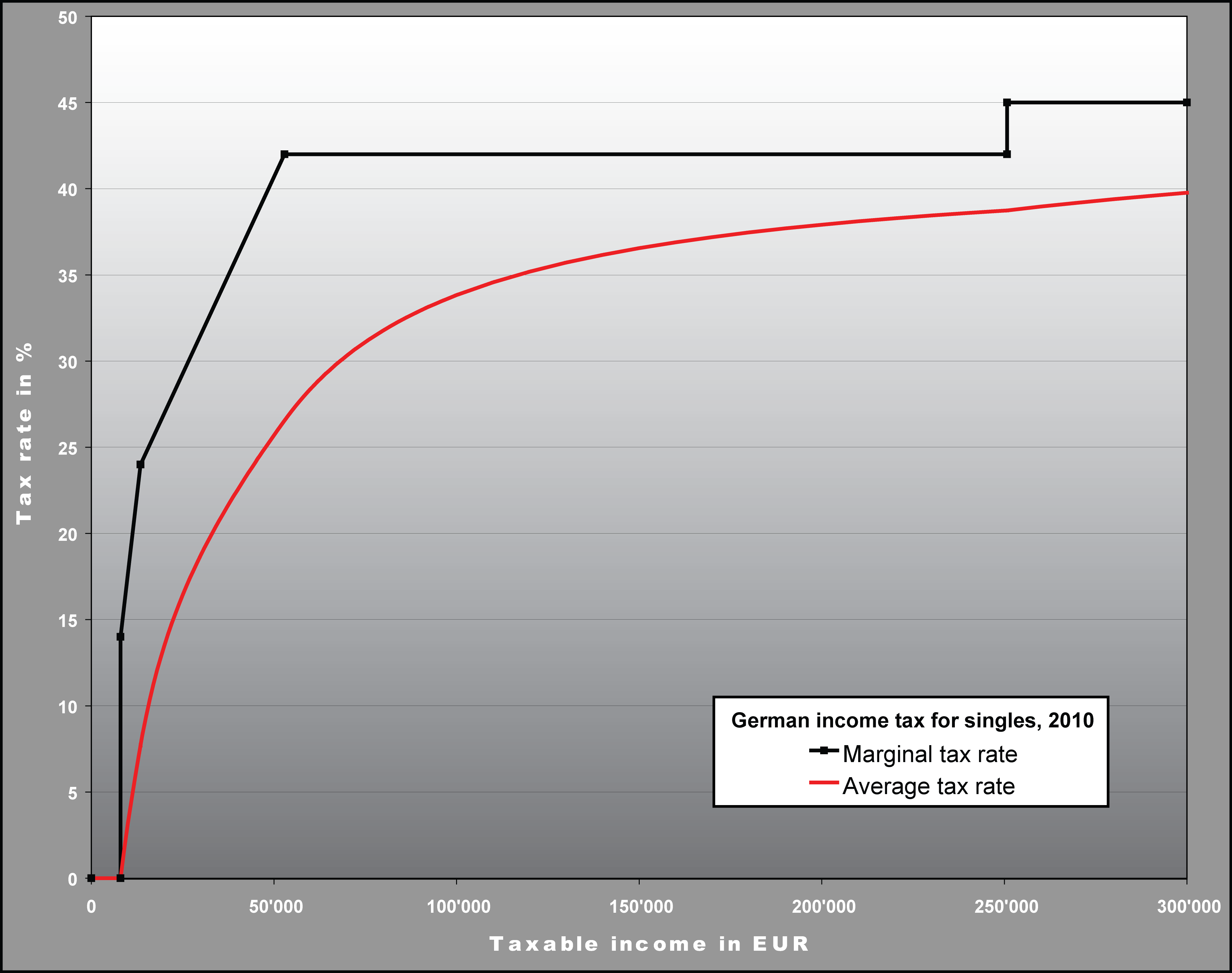
German marginal and average income tax rates display a progressive structure.

The rate of tax can be expressed in two different ways; the marginal rate expressed as the rate on each additional unit of income or expenditure (or last dollar spent) and the effective (average) rate expressed as the total tax paid divided by total income or expenditure. In most progressive tax systems, both rates will rise as the amount subject to taxation increases, though there may be ranges where the marginal rate remains constant. Usually, a taxpayer's average tax rate is lower than their marginal tax rate. In a system with refundable tax credits, or income-tested welfare benefits, marginal rates can fall as income rises, at lower levels of income.

The effective marginal tax rate is the marginal tax rate that accounts for both welfare benefits and taxes. It is the percentage of additional income that a taxpayer pays in taxes, less any changes in the value of welfare benefits and tax credits received.

Usually, tax progressivity considers only the distribution of tax costs, or the tax incidence. The distribution of costs and benefits of government expenditures may also be analyzed; together with tax incidence, this is known as fiscal incidence.

=== Inflation and tax brackets ===
Tax laws might not be accurately indexed to inflation. For example, some tax laws may ignore inflation completely. In a progressive tax system, failure to index brackets to inflation will eventually result in effective tax increases (if inflation is sustained), as wage inflation raises individual incomes and moves individuals into higher tax brackets with higher rates. This phenomenon is known as bracket creep and can cause fiscal drag.

== Economic effects ==
There is debate between politicians and economists over the role of tax policy in mitigating or exacerbating wealth inequality and the effects on economic growth.

=== Income equality ===
Progressive taxation has a direct effect on decreasing income inequality. This is especially true if taxation is used to fund progressive government spending such as transfer payments and social safety nets. However, the effect may be muted if the higher rates cause increased tax evasion. When income inequality is low, aggregate demand will be relatively high, because more people who want ordinary consumer goods and services will be able to afford them, while the labor force will not be as relatively monopolized by the wealthy. High levels of income inequality can negatively affect long-term economic growth, employment, and class conflict. Progressive taxation is often suggested as a way to mitigate the societal ills associated with higher income inequality. The difference between the Gini index for an income distribution before taxation and the Gini index after taxation is an indicator for the effects of such taxation.

The economists Thomas Piketty and Emmanuel Saez wrote that decreased progressiveness in US tax policy in the post-World War II era has increased income inequality by enabling the wealthy to have greater access to capital.

According to economist Robert H. Frank, tax cuts for the wealthy are largely spent on positional goods such as larger houses and more expensive cars. Frank argues that these funds could instead pay for things like improving public education and conducting medical research, and suggests progressive taxation as an instrument for attacking positional externalities.

=== Economic growth ===
A 2008 OECD report presented empirical evidence of a weak negative relationship between the progressivity of personal income taxes and economic growth. Describing the research, William McBride, a staff writer with the conservative Tax Foundation, stated that progressivity of income taxes can undermine investment, risk-taking, entrepreneurship, and productivity because high-income earners tend to do much of the saving, investing, risk-taking, and high-productivity labor. In contrast, according to the IMF, some advanced economies could increase progressivity in taxation for tackling inequality, without hampering growth, as long as progressivity is not excessive. The IMF also states that the average top income tax rate for OECD member countries fell from 62 percent in 1981 to 35 percent in 2015, and that in addition, tax systems are less progressive than indicated by the statutory rates, because wealthy individuals have more access to tax relief.

== Educational attainment ==
Economist Gary Becker has described educational attainment as the root of economic mobility. Progressive tax rates, while raising taxes on high income, have the goal and corresponding effect of reducing the burden on low income, improving income equality. Educational attainment is often conditional on cost and family income, which, for people with low incomes, reduces their educational opportunities, as they also face borrowing constraints. Increases in income for the poor and economic equality reduces the inequality of educational attainment. Tax policy can also include progressive features that provide tax incentives for education, such as tax credits and tax exemptions for scholarships and grants.

A potentially adverse effect of progressive tax schedules is that they may reduce the incentives for educational attainment. By reducing the after-tax income of highly educated workers, progressive taxes can reduce the incentives for citizens to attain education, thereby lowering the overall level of human capital in an economy. However, this effect can be mitigated by an education subsidy funded by the progressive tax. Theoretically, public support for government spending on higher education increases when taxation is progressive, especially when income distribution is unequal.

== Opposition and criticism ==
=== Hayek's argumentation ===
Friedrich Hayek viewed the implementation of progressive tax systems as incompatible with the principles of an open and liberal society. He argued that imposing higher taxes on higher incomes creates a bias against economic wealth and negatively affects incentives for the working-age population. His thought stems from philosophical and moral theories. Hayek believed that fiscal problems are partly rooted in the moral philosophy practiced by society. Progressive tax prohibits the incentives of free market competition, whilst the wealth of the minority is subordinated to the democratic vote of a majority. This results in illegitimate transfers of political power.

Hayek believed the sweeping rise of progressive taxation stemmed from deceptive justifications that, in reality, didn't bear fruit. He claims the historical and methodological conditions gave way to the imposition of the system. He believed the system was established on ludicrous premises and failed to attain its redistributive goals. He said the progressive tax failed to benefit people experiencing poverty; instead, the benefit fell to the middle class, who comprised the majority of voters, a majority that may push for tax changes.

Hayek advocated for a flat (or proportional) tax rate. Estonia was one of the first countries in Europe to adopt such a tax system.

=== Nozick's argumentation ===
Robert Nozick in his famous work 'Anarchy, State and Utopia' made the widely known statement: "Taxation of earnings from labor is on a par with forced labor". He acknowledged the difference between the previous forms of slavery, but holds the belief that it is just as immoral regardless. Nozick believed that the government should have a limited role in most sectors, including the economy. He advocates what's known as the 'minimal state'; hence, the government should not enforce 'redistribution' as it would minimize the rewards given by free-market forces. Whatever revenue is generated by taxes is to be spent on basic maintenance (i.e., road repairs).

== Loopholes ==
The current US tax code has been criticized by many who believe that the nation's wealthiest are not paying their share. This is because the current tax system taxes individuals based on wages rather than investment income, an area where the upper-class make most of their money. Prominent investor Warren Buffett has been a strong advocate for proportionally taxing the rich on investment income and wages. Buffett famously pointed out that if you analyzed every employee in his office, including himself, he said, "I'll probably be the lowest paying taxpayer in the office." This support ultimately led to the proposal of "The Buffett Rule" by President Barack Obama which proposed a 30% minimum tax on people making more than $1 million a year. The aim of the Buffett Rule was to ensure that investment income would be considered as taxable income instead of simply wages. Ultimately, the rule was rejected by Congress in March 2012. President Joe Biden attempted to do what President Obama could not and introduced the "Paying a Fair Share Act", which followed the Buffett Rule philosophy. As of August 2023, the bill has not picked up steam in Congress. Those who take advantage of these tax codes in the United States include some of the wealthiest and most prominent. It is said that "Bezos reportedly paid no federal income taxes at all in 2007 and 2011, while Musk paid none in 2018."

== Psychological factors ==
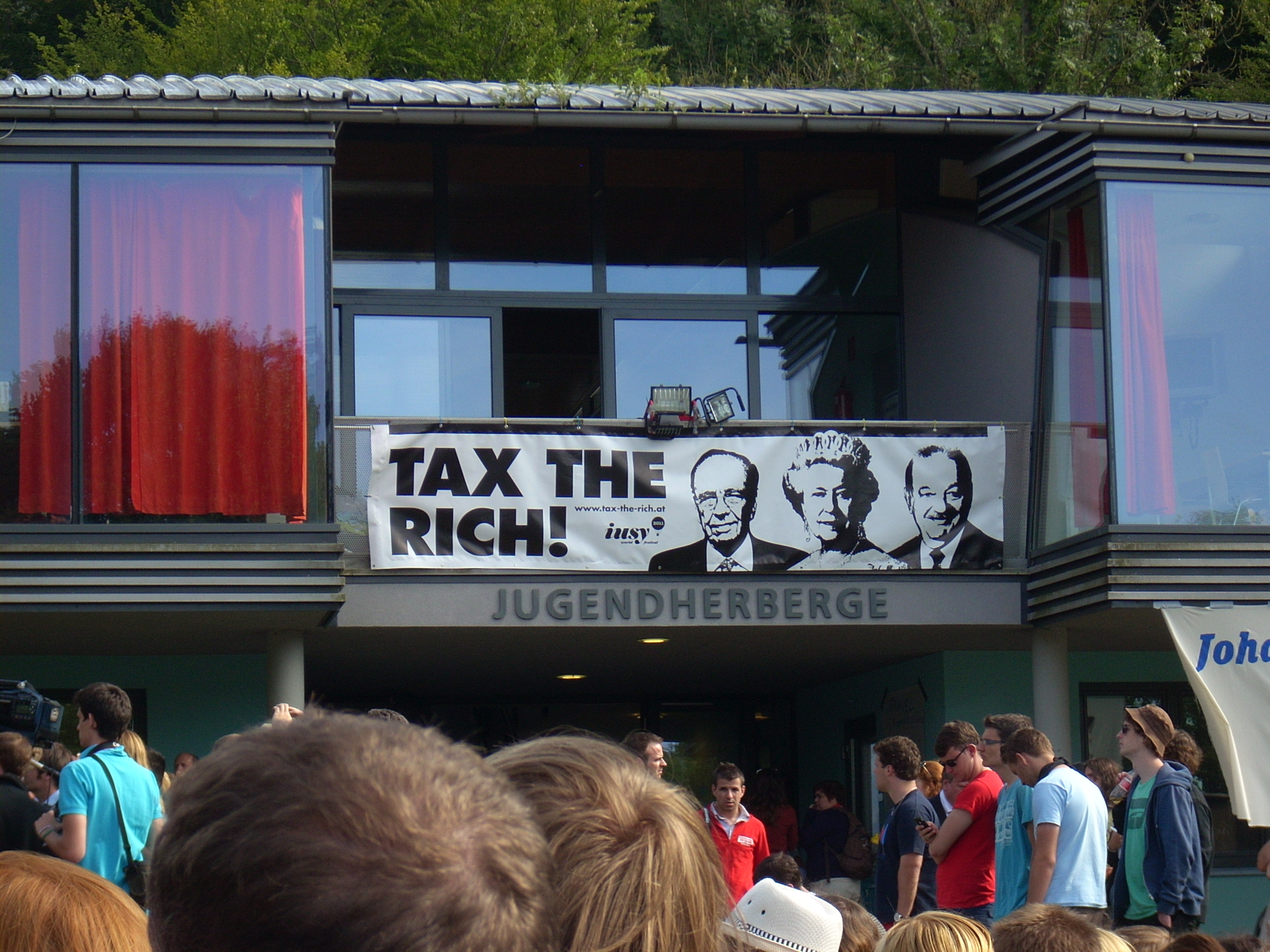
"Tax The Rich" banner at an International Union of Socialist Youth campaign for a financial transaction tax

A 2011 study by psychologists Shigehiro Oishi, Ulrich Schimmack, and Ed Diener, using data from 54 countries, found that progressive taxation was positively associated with subjective well-being, while overall tax rates and government spending were not. The authors added, "We found that the association between more-progressive taxation and higher levels of subjective well-being was mediated by citizens' satisfaction with public goods, such as education and public transportation." Tax law professor Thomas D. Griffith, summarizing research on human happiness, has argued that because inequality in a society significantly reduces happiness, a progressive tax structure which redistributes income would increase welfare and happiness in a society. Since progressive taxation reduces the income of high earners and is often used as a method to fund government social programs for low income earners, calls for increasing tax progressivity have sometimes been labeled as envy or class warfare, while others may describe such actions as fair or a form of social justice.

Even though studies conclude that a progressive tax can be positively associated with increased well-being among certain individuals, experts note that many wealthy democracies are often hesitant to enforce progressive taxes. A study conducted by Yale political scientist Kenneth Scheve and David Stasavage of New York University, published in the journal Comparative Political Studies, helps explain why that is. Their research found that voters believe all citizens should be treated equally in terms of taxation, regardless of income. The authors cite this reasoning as one of the main reasons certain countries refuse to raise taxes on the wealthy despite rising inequality. Kenneth Scheve is quoted as saying, "Progressive taxation is a powerful policy tool for responding to rising inequality, but we found that wealthy democracies don't resort to it very often". The study results are from studies conducted in the United Kingdom, the United States, and Germany. Contrary to a progressive tax, some voters argue that a fair tax system should take into account whether individuals earned their wealth through hard work, rather than whether others did. This perspective emphasizes equal-treatment fairness norms, which suggest that all citizens should be treated equally in areas such as voting rights and legal protections. Accordingly, these voters believe that everyone should pay the same tax rate, mirroring the concept of equal treatment. While progressive tax policies may address income inequality in certain countries, a significant segment of the population opposes them on the grounds of political equality. This opposition may hinder the formation of a consensus to address inequality by raising taxes on higher incomes and wealth.

== Computation ==
The function which defines the progressive approach to an income tax may be mathematically defined as a piecewise function. In every piece (tax bracket), it must be computed cumulatively, considering the taxes which had already been computed for the previous tax brackets. Pictured is the effective income tax for Portugal in 2012 and 2013.

There are two common ways of computing a progressive tax, corresponding to point–slope form and slope–intercept form of the equation for the applicable bracket. These compute the tax either as the tax on the bottom amount of the bracket, plus the tax on the marginal amount within the bracket; or the tax on the entire amount (at the marginal rate), minus the amount that this overstates the tax on the bottom end of the bracket.

For example, suppose there are tax brackets of 10%, 20%, and 30%, where the 10% rate applies to income from $1 to 10,000; the 20% rate applies to income from $10,001 to 20,000; and the 30% rate applies to all income above $20,000. In that case, the tax on $20,000 of income (computed by adding up tax in each bracket) is $10\% \times \$10,000 + 20\% \times \$10,000 = \$1,000 + \$2,000 = \$3,000$. The tax on $25,000 of income could then be computed two ways. Using point–slope form (tax on bottom amount plus tax on marginal amount) yields:
$$\$3,000 + (\$25,000 - \$20,000) \times 30\% = \$1,500 + \$3,000 = \$4,500.$$
Geometrically, the line for tax on the top bracket passes through the point $(\$20,000, \$3,000)$ and has a slope of 0.3 (30%).

Alternatively, 30% tax on $20,000 yields $30\% \times \$20,000 = \$6,000$, which overstates tax on the bottom end of the top bracket by $\$6,000 - \$3,000 = \$3,000$, so using slope–intercept form yields:
$$\$25,000 \times 30\% - \$3,000 = \$7,500 - \$3,000 = \$4,500.$$
Geometrically, the line for tax on the top bracket intercepts the y-axis at −$3,000 – it passes through the point $(0, -\$3,000)$ – and has a slope of 0.3 (30%).

In the United States, the first form was used through 2003, for example (for the 2003 15% Single bracket):

- If the amount on Form 1040, line 40 [Taxable Income], is: Over— 7,000
- But not over— 28,400
- Enter on Form 1040, line 41 [Tax] $700.00 + 15%
- of the amount over— 7,000

From 2004, this changed to the second form, for example (for the 2004 28% Single bracket):

- Taxable income. If line 42 is— At least $100,000 but not over $146,750
- (a) Enter the amount from line 42
- (b) Multiplication amount × 28% (.28)
- (c) Multiply (a) by (b)
- (d) Subtraction amount $5,373.00
- Tax. Subtract (d) from (c). Enter the result here and on Form 1040, line 43

== Examples ==
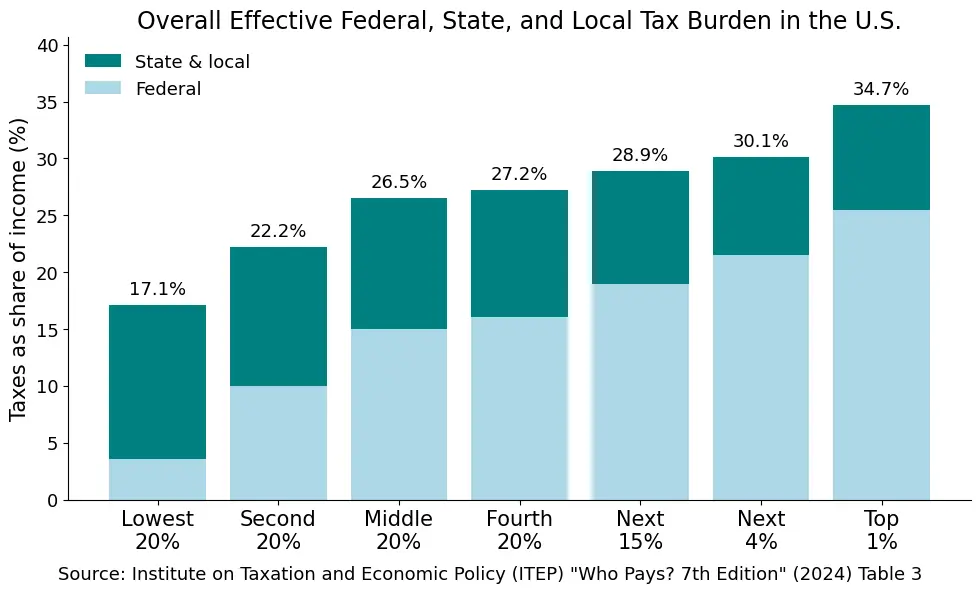
Overall tax burden in the US in 2024

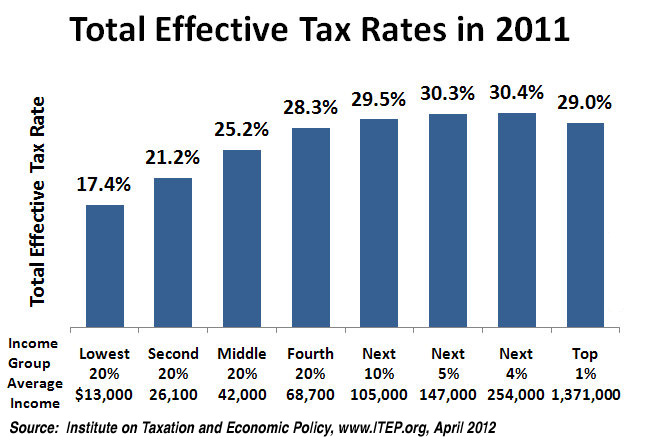
Overall tax burden in the US in 2011

Most systems around the world contain progressive aspects. When taxable income falls within a particular tax bracket, the individual pays the listed percentage of tax on each dollar that falls within that monetary range. For example, a person in the U.S. who earned $10,000 US of taxable income (income after adjustments, deductions, and exemptions) would be liable for 10% of each dollar earned from the 1st dollar to the 7,550th dollar, and then for 15% of each dollar earned from the 7,551st dollar to the 10,000th dollar, for a total of $1,122.50.

In the United States, there are seven income tax brackets ranging from 10% to 39.6% above an untaxed level of income based on the personal exemption and usually various other tax exemptions, such as the Earned Income Tax Credit and home mortgage payments. The federal tax rates for individual taxpayers in the United States for the tax year 2021 are as follows: 10% from $0 to $9,950; 12% from $9,950 to $40,525; 22% from $40,525 to $86,375; 24% from $86,375 to $164,925; 32% from $164,925 to $209,425; 35% from $209,425 to $523,600; and 37% from $523,600 and over. The US federal tax system also includes deductions for state and local taxes for lower income households which mitigates what are sometimes regressive taxes, particularly property taxes. Higher-income households are subject to the alternative minimum tax, which limits deductions and sets a flat tax rate of 26% to 28%, with the higher rate applying to income above $175,000. There are also deduction phaseouts starting at $112,500 for single filers. The net effect is increased progressivity that completely limits deductions for state and local taxes and certain other credits for individuals earning more than $306,300. To counteract regressive state and local taxes, many US states implement progressive income taxes. 32 states and the District of Columbia have graduated-rate income taxes. The brackets differ across states.

There has been a hefty decline in the progressivity of the United States federal tax system since the 1960s. The two periods with the largest reductions in tax progressivity occurred under the presidency of Ronald Reagan in the 1980s and the presidency of George W. Bush in the 2000s. The Tax Cuts and Jobs Act of 2017 implemented by President Donald Trump greatly affected the United States tax system. The act took steps to dramatically lower taxes for high-income households, open loopholes for business deductions, and cut the federal corporate tax rate to 21 percent. It maintained the structure of seven tax brackets for personal income but lowered five of the seven by one percent or more. For example, after the Tax Cuts and Jobs Act of 2017 was implemented, in 2017, a married couple with a total income of $250,000 after deductions would have faced a tax rate of 33%. However, by 2023 and 2024, their highest tax rate would have decreased to 24%. This change would have resulted in a notable disparity in their take-home pay compared to previous years.

Albania transitioned from a flat tax to a progressive tax in 2014. Kraja, Lirëza and Morelli have concluded that while a progressive tax framework may be more effective in achieving policy objectives like reducing income inequality and boosting government tax revenue, policymakers must carefully weigh its impact on investment and entrepreneurship and implement strong tax administration and enforcement measures to combat tax evasion within a progressive tax framework.

Belgium has the following personal income tax rates (for the income year 2021): 25% from EUR€0 to €13,540; 40% from €13,540 to €23,900; 45% from €23,900 to €41,360; and 50% from €41,360 and any amount over.

Canada has the following federal tax rates on income (for the year 2021): 15% from C$0 to $49,020; 20.5% from $49,020 to $98,040; 26% from $98,040 to $151,978; 29% from $151,978 to $216,511; and 33% on income over $216,511.

Denmark has the following state tax rates on personal income: 12.11% for the lower tax bracket; 15% for the higher tax bracket, or income exceeding DKK 544,800. Additional taxes, such as the municipal tax (which has a country average of 24.971%), the labour market tax, and the church tax, are also applied to an individual's income.

Germany has the following personal income tax rates for a single taxpayer (for the 2020 tax year): 0% up to EUR€9,744; 14-42% from €9,744 to €57,918; 42% from €57,918 to €274,612; and 45% for €274,612 and any amount over.

Indonesia has implemented progressive vehicular taxes at the municipal level in Cimahi and Palembang, which had a significant impact of the progressive tax system on the local income of the municipality.

Norway has the following personal income tax rates (for the year 2020): 1.9% from NOK180,800 to NOK254,500; 4.2% from NOK254,500 to NOK639,750; 13.2% from NOK639,750 to NOK999,550; and 16.2% from NOK999,550 and above.

Sweden has the following state income tax brackets for natural persons: 0% on income up to SEK 413,200; 20% from SEK 413,200 to SEK 591,600; and 25% from SEK 591,600 and any amount over.

The United Kingdom has the following income tax rates: 0% from £0 to £12,570; 20% from £12,571 to £50,270; 40% from £50,271 to £150,000; and 45% from £150,000 and over. In Scotland, however, there are more tax brackets than in other UK countries. Scotland has the following additional income tax brackets: 19% on income from £12,571 to £14,667; 20% on income from £14,667 to £25,296; 21% on income from £25,297 to £43,662; 41% on income from £43,663 to £150,000; and 46% on income over £150,000.

New Zealand has the following income tax brackets: 10.5% up to NZ$14,000; 17.5% from NZ$14,001 to NZ$48,000; 30% from NZ$48,001 to NZ$70,000; 33% from NZ$70,001 to NZ$180,000; 39% for any amount over NZ$180,000; and 45% when the employee does not complete a declaration form. All values are in New Zealand dollars and exclude the earner levy.

Australia has the following progressive income tax rates (for the 2024-2025 financial year): 0% effective up to A$18,200; 16% from A$18,201 to A$45,000; 30% from A$45,001 to A$135,000; 37% from A$135,001 to A$190,000; and 45% for any amount over A$190,000.

Italy also follows a progressive tax blueprint. As of October 2020, the progressive tax rates in Italy are outlined as follows. Income between 0 and €15,000 – 23%, €15,000 – €28,000 – 25%, €28,000 – €50,000 – 35%, €50,000 and over – 43%.

== See also ==
- Compound empowerment
- Democratic socialism – Political philosophy
- Economic progressivism – Political and economic philosophy
- Equity in taxation – Economic concept of fairness
- Income tax – Tax based on taxable income
- Optimal tax – Design and implementation of tax policy maximizing social welfare
- Redistribution of income and wealth – Political philosophy
- Robin Hood effect – Economic occurrence
- Social democracy – Centre-left political ideology
- Suits index – Measure of tax progressiveness
- Taxable income elasticity – Representation of the relationship between taxation and government revenue
- Tax bracket – Division at which a tax rate changes
- Tax incidence – Measure of the economic effect of a tax
- X tax – Form of consumption tax

Contrasting models:

- Proportional tax – Fixed fraction of source
- Regressive tax – Higher tax ratio on poorer sources
