= Effects of economic inequality =

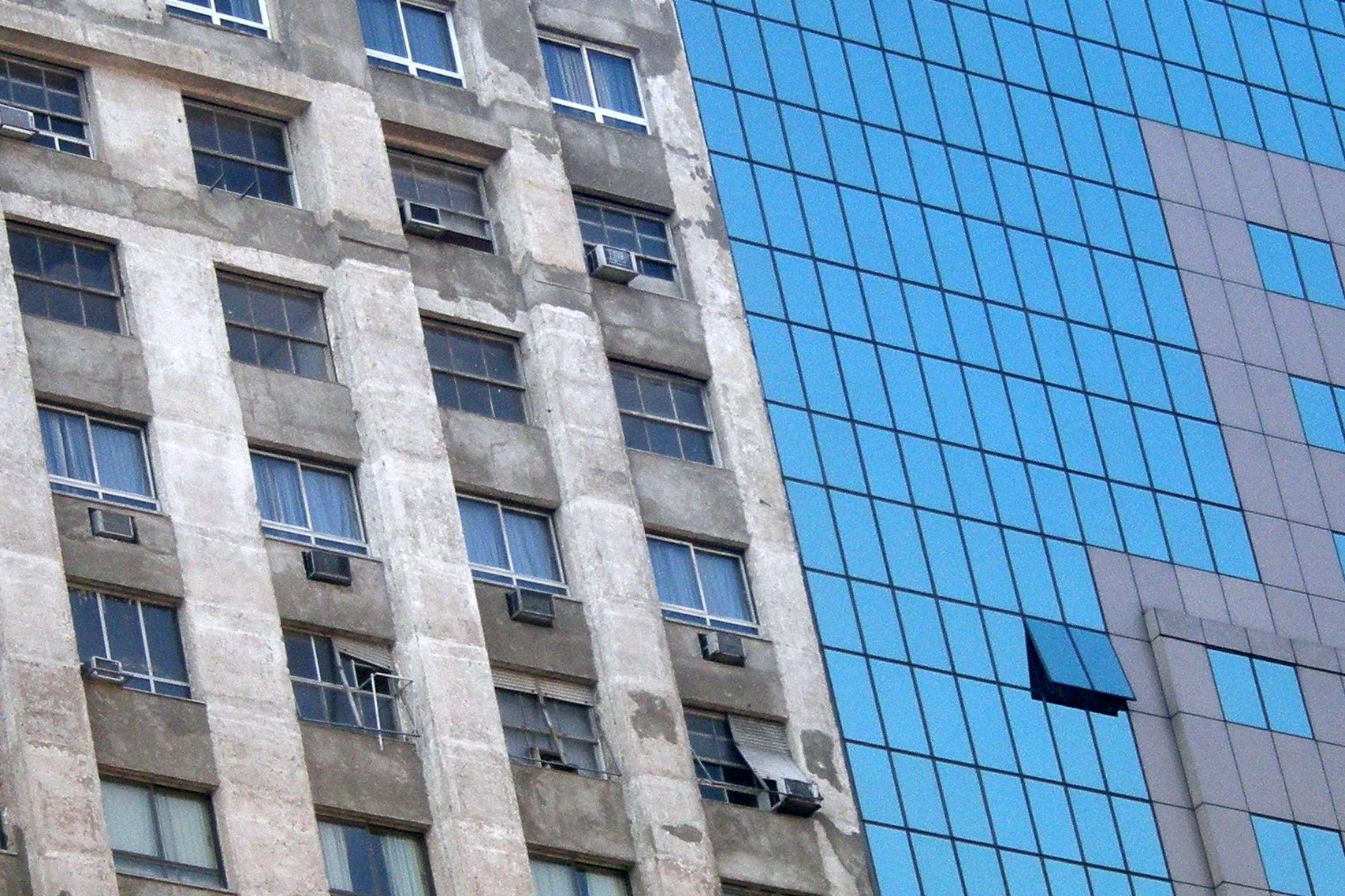
Buildings in Rio de Janeiro, demonstrating economic inequality

Effects of income inequality, researchers have found, include higher rates of health and social problems, and lower rates of social goods, a lower population-wide satisfaction and happiness and even a lower level of economic growth when human capital is neglected for high-end consumption. For the top 21 industrialised countries, counting each person equally, life expectancy is lower in more unequal countries (r = -.907). A similar relationship exists among US states (r = -.620).

2013 Economics Nobel prize winner Robert J. Shiller said that rising inequality in the United States and elsewhere is the most important problem.

== Health ==
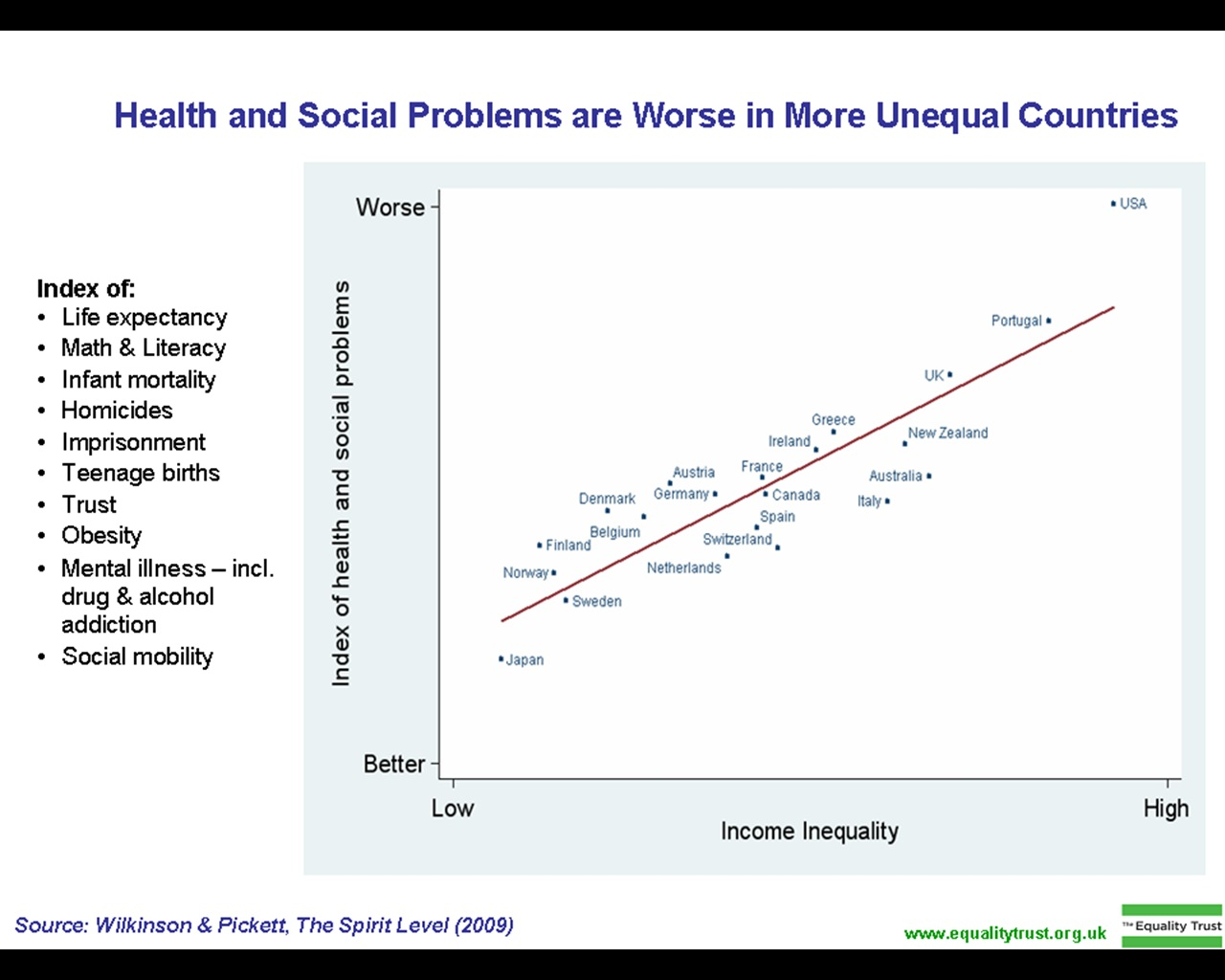
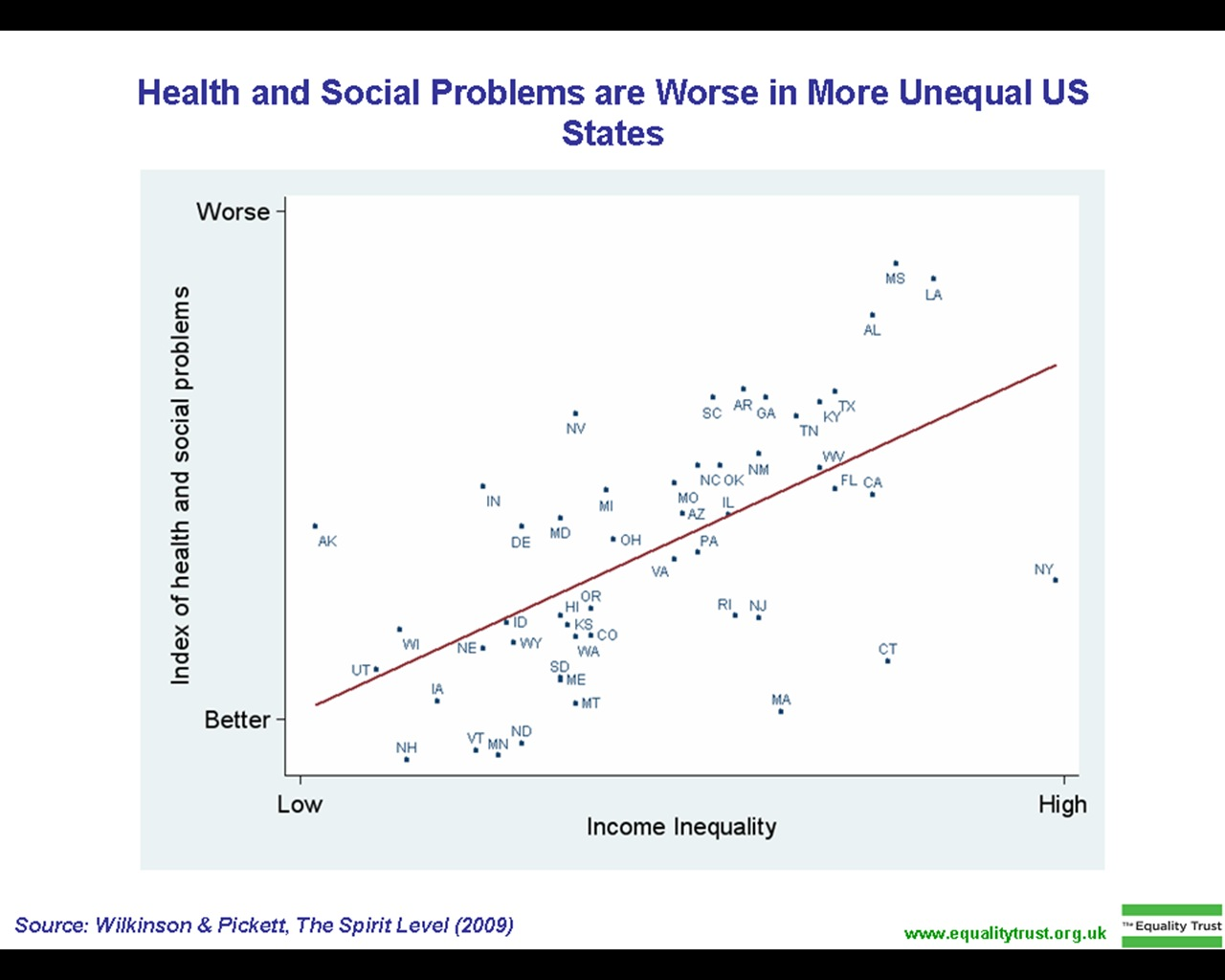
Health and social problems are worse in more unequal countries and in more unequal US states, though the reason for this correlation remains debated. The income inequality of countries is the 20:20 ratio measure of income inequality from the United Nations Development Programme Human Development Indicators, 2003-6 and for states it is the 1999 Gini index.

British researchers Richard G. Wilkinson and Kate Pickett have found higher rates of health and social problems (obesity, mental illness, homicides, teenage births, incarceration, child conflict, drug use), and lower rates of social goods (life expectancy by country, educational performance, trust among strangers, women's status, social mobility, even numbers of patents issued) in countries and states with higher inequality. Using statistics from 23 developed countries and the 50 states of the US, they found social and health problems lower in countries like Japan and Finland and states like Utah and New Hampshire with high levels of equality, than in countries (US and UK) and states (Mississippi and New York) with large differences in household income.

For most of human history higher material living standards – full stomachs, access to clean water and warmth from fuel – led to better health and longer lives. This pattern of higher incomes and longer lives still holds among poorer countries, where life expectancy increases rapidly as per capita income increases, but in recent decades it has slowed down among middle income countries and plateaued among the richest thirty or so countries in the world. Americans live no longer on average (about 77 years in 2004) than Greeks (78 years) or New Zealanders (78), though the USA has a higher GDP per capita. Life expectancy in Sweden (80 years) and Japan (82) – where income was more equally distributed – was longer. It has been suggested that the decline in life expectancy in the United States beginning in the late 2010s is linked to extreme inequality.

In recent years the characteristic that has strongly correlated with health problems in developed countries is income inequality. Creating an index of "Health and Social Problems" from nine factors, authors Richard Wilkinson and Kate Pickett found health and social problems "more common in countries with bigger income inequalities", and more common among states in the US with larger income inequalities. Other studies have confirmed this relationship. The UNICEF index of "child well-being in rich countries", studying 40 indicators in 22 countries, correlates with greater equality but not per capita income. Pickett and Wilkinson argue that inequality and social stratification lead to higher levels of psychosocial stress and status anxiety which can lead to depression, chemical dependency, less community life, parenting problems and stress-related diseases.

In their book, Social Epidemiology, Ichiro Kawachi and S.V. Subramanian found that impoverished individuals simply cannot lead healthy lives as easily as the wealthy. They are unable to secure adequate nutrition for their families, cannot pay utility bills to keep themselves warm during the winter or cold during heat waves, and lack sufficient housing.

Conversely, some researchers have criticised the view that economic inequality causes worse health outcomes, with some studies failing to confirm the relationship or finding that the relationship was more complicated due to issues of determining causality, inadequate data, correlation versus causation or confounding variables (for example, more unequal countries tend to be economically poorer).

== Social cohesion ==
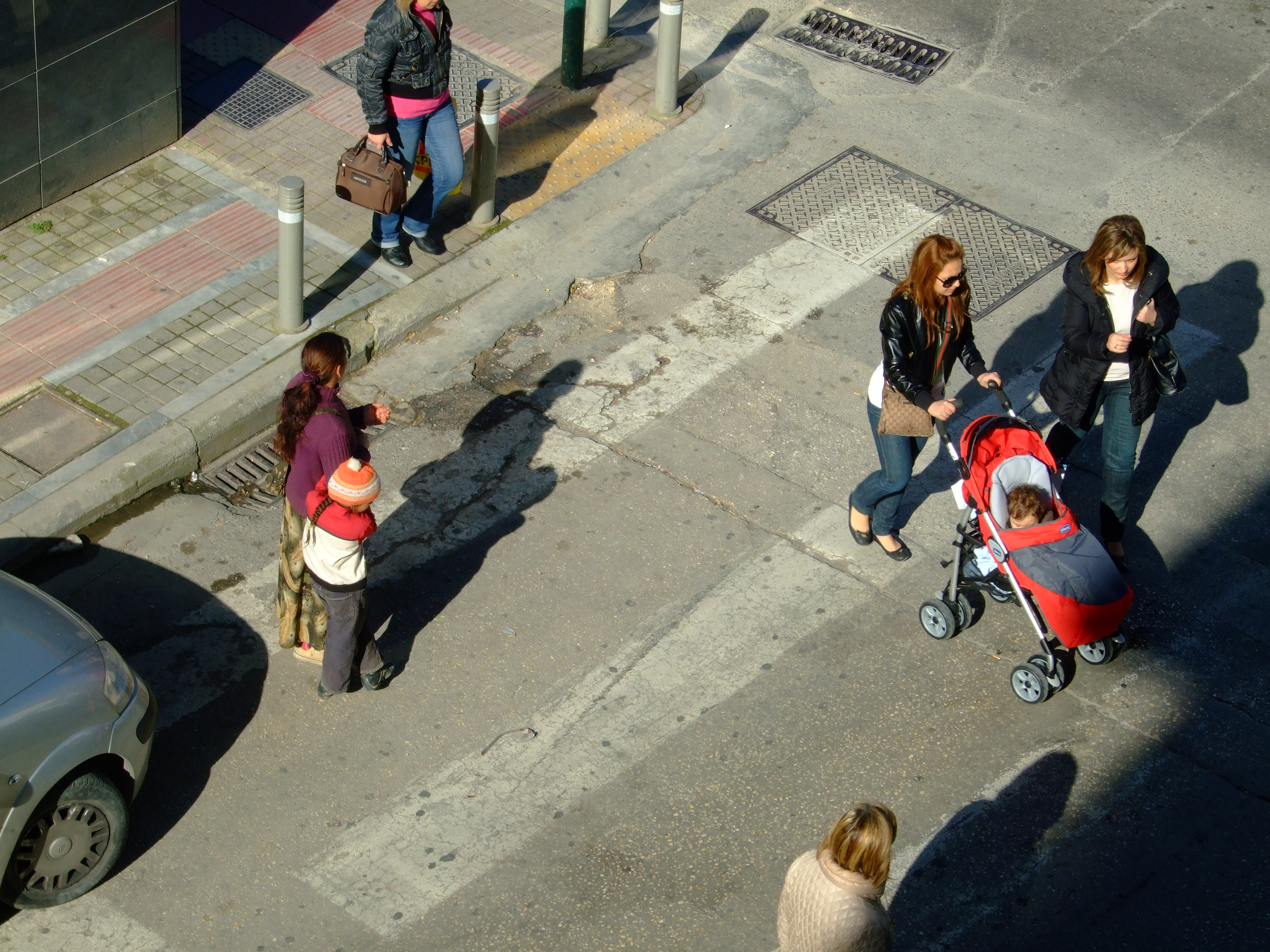
A woman begging in Patras, Greece

Research has shown an inverse link between income inequality and social cohesion. In more equal societies, people are much more likely to trust each other, measures of social capital (the benefits of goodwill, fellowship, mutual sympathy and social connectedness among groups who make up a social units) suggest greater community involvement, and homicide rates are consistently lower.

Comparing results from the question "would others take advantage of you if they got the chance?" in U.S General Social Survey and statistics on income inequality, Eric Uslaner and Mitchell Brown found there is a high correlation between the amount of trust in society and the amount of income equality. A 2008 article by Andersen and Fetner also found a strong relationship between economic inequality within and across countries and tolerance for 35 democracies.

In two studies Robert Putnam established links between social capital and economic inequality. His most important studies established these links in both the United States and in Italy. His explanation for this relationship is that

Community and equality are mutually reinforcing... Social capital and economic inequality moved in tandem through most of the twentieth century. In terms of the distribution of wealth and income, America in the 1950s and 1960s was more egalitarian than it had been in more than a century... [T]hose same decades were also the high point of social connectedness and civic engagement. Record highs in equality and social capital coincided. Conversely, the last third of the twentieth century was a time of growing inequality and eroding social capital... The timing of the two trends is striking: somewhere around 1965–70 America reversed course and started becoming both less just economically and less well connected socially and politically.

Albrekt Larsen has advanced this explanation by a comparative study of how trust increased in Denmark and Sweden in the latter part of the 20th century while it decreased in the US and UK. It is argued that inequality levels influence how citizens imagine the trustworthiness of fellow citizens. In this model social trust is not about relations to people you meet (as in Putnam's model) but about people you imagine.

The economist Joseph Stiglitz has argued that economic inequality has led to distrust of business and government.

== Crime ==
Studies show mixed results on crime correlates with inequality. Daly et al. 2001 estimated that about half of all variation in homicide rates among U.S. states and Canadian provinces can be accounted for by differences in the amount of inequality in each province or state. Fajnzylber et al. (2002) found a similar relationship worldwide. A 2016 study, controlling for different factors than previous studies, challenges the aforementioned findings. The study finds "little evidence of a significant empirical link between overall inequality and crime", and that "the previously reported positive correlation between violent crime and economic inequality is largely driven by economic segregation across neighborhoods instead of within-neighborhood inequality". A 2020 study found that in Europe, the inequality-crime correlation was present but weak (0.10), explaining less than 3% of the variance in crime with a similar finding occurring for the United States, while another 2019 study argued that the effect of inequality on property crime was nearly zero. A 2024 study found no or little association between crime and inequality.

== Redistribution and welfare ==
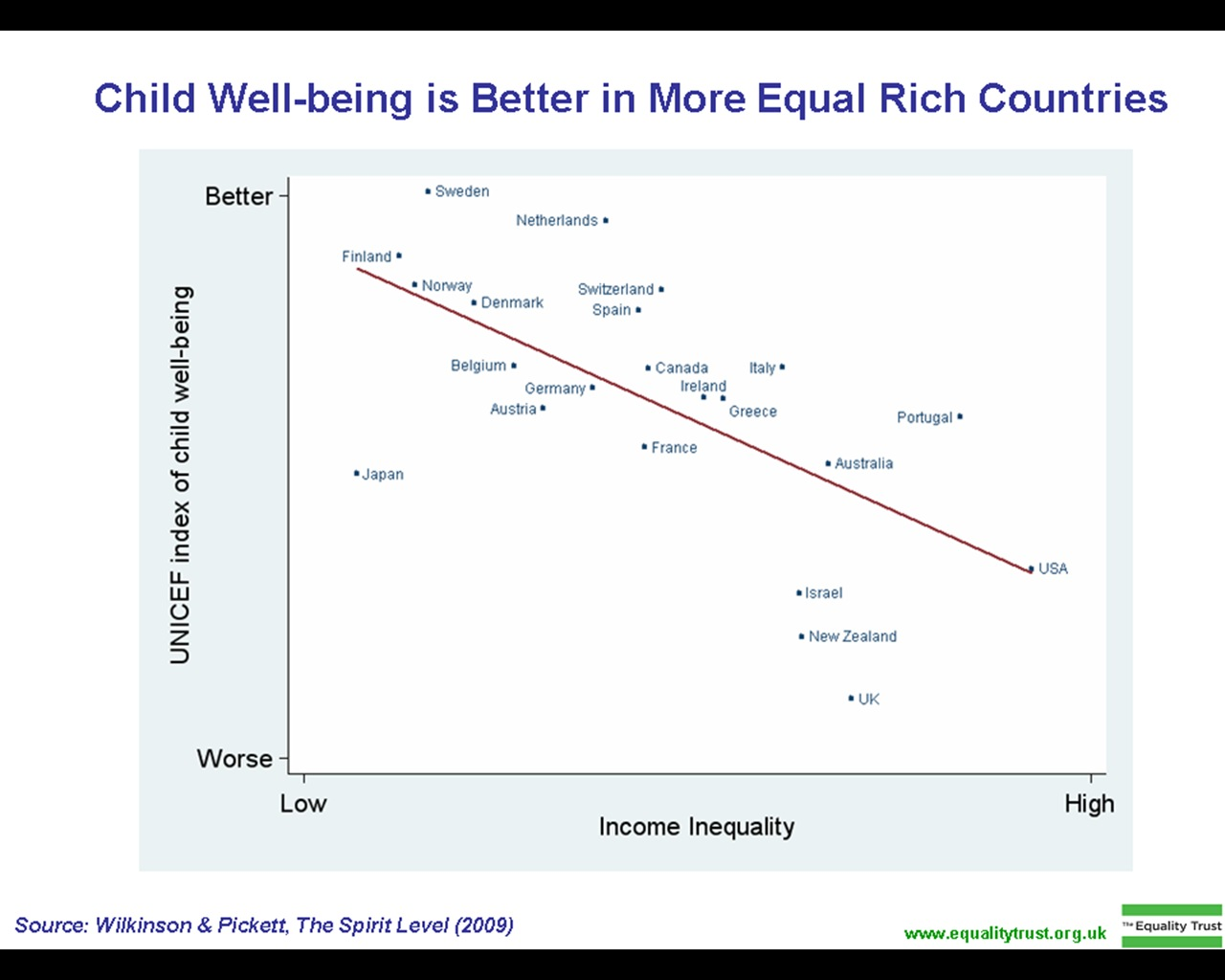
Child well-being is better in more equal rich countries

Following the utilitarian principle of seeking the greatest good for the greatest number – economic inequality is problematic. A house that provides less utility to a millionaire as a summer home than it would to a homeless family of five, is an example of reduced "distributive efficiency" within society, that decreases marginal utility of wealth and thus the sum total of personal utility. An additional dollar spent by a poor person will go to things providing a great deal of utility to that person, such as basic necessities like food, water, and healthcare; while, an additional dollar spent by a much richer person will very likely go to luxury items providing relatively less utility to that person. Thus, the marginal utility of wealth per person ("the additional dollar") decreases as a person becomes richer. From this standpoint, for any given amount of wealth in society, a society with more equality will have higher aggregate utility. Some studies have found evidence for this theory, noting that in societies where inequality is lower, population-wide satisfaction and happiness tend to be higher.

Philosopher David Schmidtz argues that maximizing the sum of individual utilities will harm incentives to produce.

A society that takes Joe Rich's second unit [of corn] is taking that unit away from someone who . . . has nothing better to do than plant it and giving it to someone who . . . does have something better to do with it. That sounds good, but in the process, the society takes seed corn out of production and diverts it to food, thereby cannibalizing itself.

However, in addition to the diminishing marginal utility of unequal distribution, Pigou and others point out that a "keeping up with the Joneses" effect among the well off may lead to greater inequality and use of resources for no greater return in utility.

a larger proportion of the satisfaction yielded by the incomes of rich people comes from their relative, rather than from their absolute, amount. This part of it will not be destroyed if the incomes of all rich people are diminished together. The loss of economic welfare suffered by the rich when command over resources is transferred from them to the poor will, therefore, be substantially smaller relatively to the gain of economic welfare to the poor than a consideration of the law of diminishing utility taken by itself suggests.

When the goal is to own the biggest yacht – rather than a boat with certain features – there is no greater benefit from owning 100 metre long boat than a 20 m one as long as it is bigger than your rival.

Economist Robert H. Frank compare the situation to that of male elks who use their antlers to spar with other males for mating rights.

The pressure to have bigger ones than your rivals leads to an arms race that consumes resources that could have been used more efficiently for other things, such as fighting off disease. As a result, every male ends up with a cumbersome and expensive pair of antlers, ... and "life is more miserable for bull elk as a group."

Firstly, certain costs are difficult to avoid and are shared by everyone, such as the costs of housing, pensions, education and health care. If the state does not provide these services, then for those on lower incomes, the costs must be borrowed and often those on lower incomes are those who are worse equipped to manage their finances. Secondly, aspirational consumption describes the process of middle income earners aspiring to achieve the standards of living enjoyed by their wealthier counterparts and one method of achieving this aspiration is by taking on debt. The result leads to even greater inequality and potential economic instability.

== Poverty ==
Oxfam asserts that worsening inequality is impeding the fight against global poverty. A 2013 report from the group stated that the $240 billion added to the fortunes of the world's richest billionaires in 2012 was enough to end extreme poverty four times over. Oxfam Executive Director Jeremy Hobbs said that "We can no longer pretend that the creation of wealth for a few will inevitably benefit the many – too often the reverse is true." The 2018 Oxfam report said that the income of the world's billionaires in 2017, $762 billion, was enough to end extreme global poverty four times over.

Jared Bernstein and Elise Gould of the Economic Policy Institute suggest that poverty in the United States could have been significantly mitigated if inequality had not increased over the last few decades.

== Housing ==
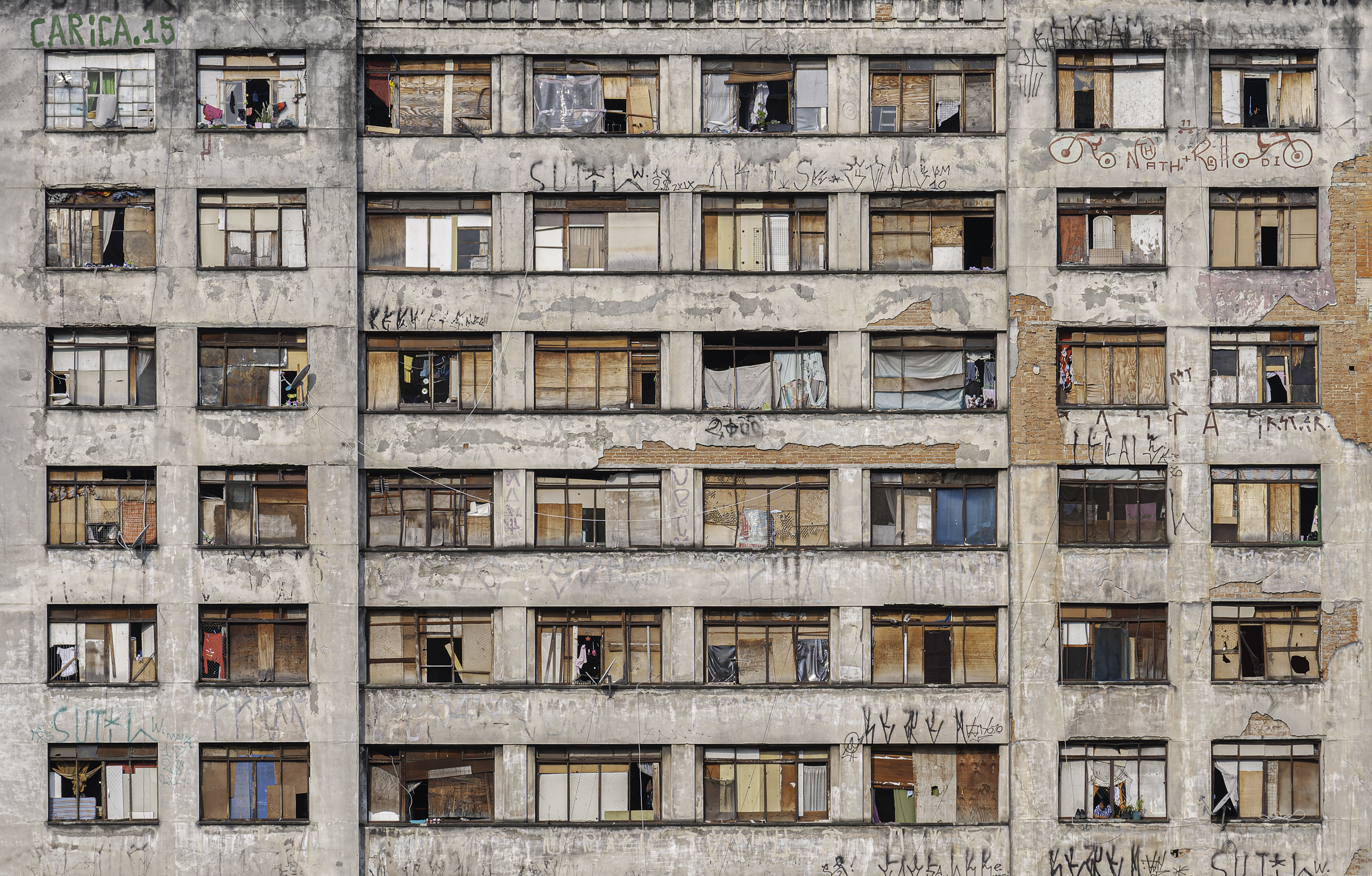
Ran down housing complex in Brazil.

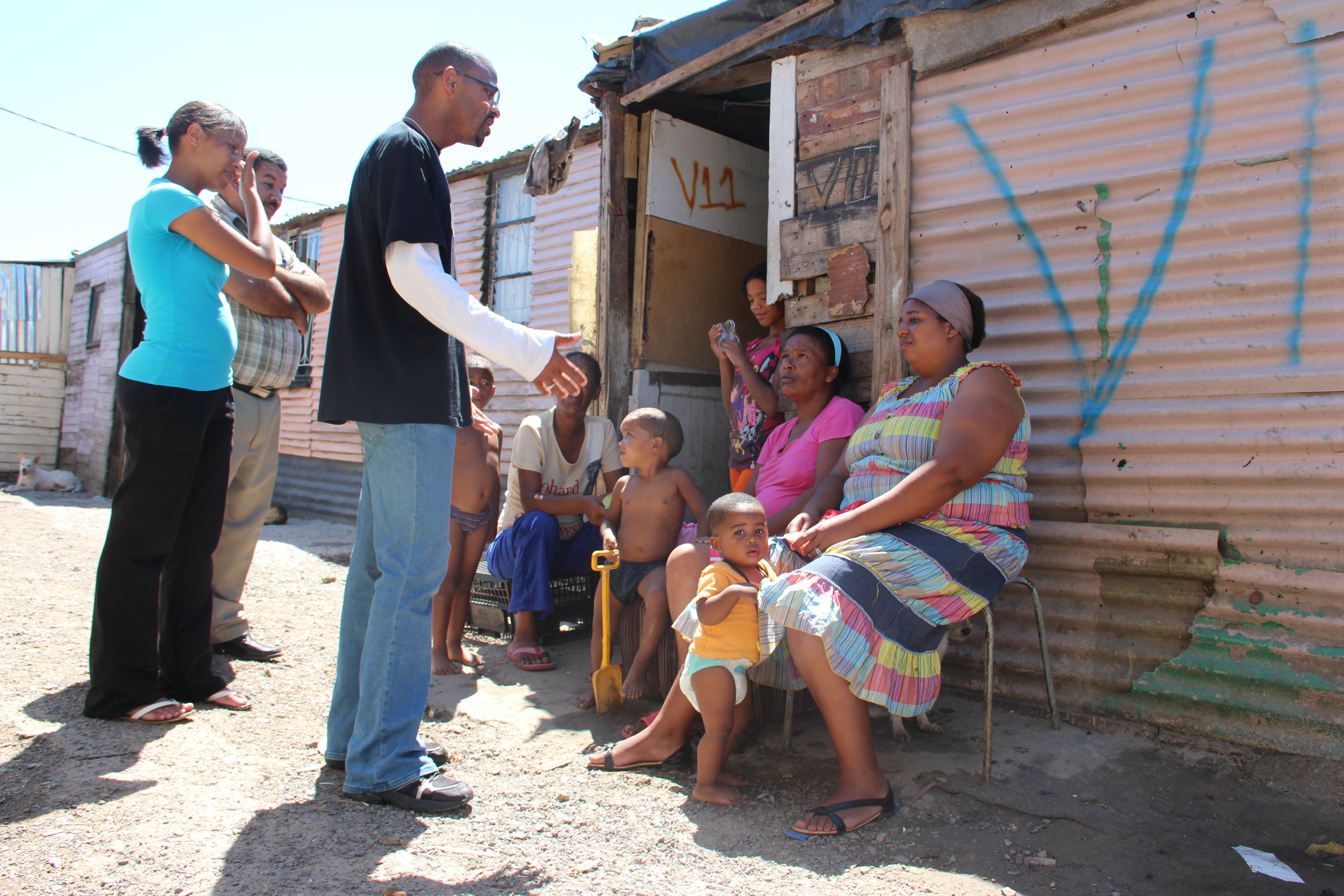
Ran down houses in Cape Town, South Africa with residents sitting outside.

In many poor and developing countries, much land and housing is held outside the formal or legal property ownership registration system. Much unregistered property is held in informal form through various associations and other arrangements. Reasons for extra-legal ownership include excessive bureaucratic red tape in buying property and building; in some countries it can take over 200 steps and up to 14 years to build on government land. Other causes of extra-legal property are failures to notarize transaction documents or having documents notarized but failing to have them recorded with the official agency.

A number of researchers (David Rodda, Jacob Vigdor, and Janna Matlack), argue that a shortage of affordable housing – at least in the US – is caused in part by income inequality. David Rodda noted that from 1984 and 1991, the number of quality rental units decreased as the demand for higher quality housing increased (Rhoda 1994:148).

== Aggregate demand, consumption and debt ==
Conservative researchers have argued that income inequality is not significant because consumption, rather than income should be the measure of inequality, and inequality of consumption is less extreme than inequality of income in the US. According to Johnson, Smeeding, and Tory, consumption inequality was actually lower in 2001 than it was in 1986. The debate is summarized in "The Hidden Prosperity of the Poor" by journalist Thomas B. Edsall. Other studies have not found consumption inequality less dramatic than household income inequality, and the CBO's study found consumption data not "adequately" capturing "consumption by high-income households" as it does their income, though it did agree that household consumption numbers show more equal distribution than household income.

Others dispute the importance of consumption over income, pointing out that if middle and lower income are consuming more than they earn it is because they are saving less or going deeper into debt. Income inequality has been the driving factor in the growing household debt, as high earners bid up the price of real estate and middle income earners go deeper into debt trying to maintain what once was a middle class lifestyle.

Central Banking economist Raghuram Rajan argues that "systematic economic inequalities, within the United States and around the world, have created deep financial 'fault lines' that have made [financial] crises more likely to happen than in the past" such as the 2008 financial crisis. To compensate for stagnating and declining purchasing power, political pressure has developed to extend easier credit to the lower and middle income earners – particularly to buy homes – and easier credit in general to keep unemployment rates low. This has given the American economy a tendency to go "from bubble to bubble" fueled by unsustainable monetary stimulation.

== Monopolization of labor, consolidation, and competition ==
Greater income inequality can lead to monopolization of the labor force, resulting in fewer employers requiring fewer workers . Remaining employers can consolidate and take advantage of the relative lack of competition, leading to less consumer choice, market abuses, and relatively higher real prices.

== Economic incentives ==
Some economists believe that one of the main reasons that inequality might induce economic incentive is because material well-being and conspicuous consumption relate to status. In this view, high stratification of income (high inequality) creates high amounts of social stratification, leading to greater competition for status.

One of the first writers to note this relationship, Adam Smith, recognized "regard" as one of the major driving forces behind economic activity. From The Theory of Moral Sentiments in 1759:

[W]hat is the end of avarice and ambition, of the pursuit of wealth, of power, and pre-eminence? Is it to supply the necessities of nature? The wages of the meanest labourer can supply them... [W]hy should those who have been educated in the higher ranks of life, regard it as worse than death, to be reduced to live, even without labour, upon the same simple fare with him, to dwell under the same lowly roof, and to be clothed in the same humble attire? From whence, then, arises that emulation which runs through all the different ranks of men, and what are the advantages which we propose by that great purpose of human life which we call bettering our condition? To be observed, to be attended to, to be taken notice of with sympathy, complacency, and approbation, are all the advantages which we can propose to derive from it. It is the vanity, not the ease, or the pleasure, which interests us.

Modern sociologists and economists such as Juliet Schor and Robert H. Frank have studied the extent to which economic activity is fueled by the ability of consumption to represent social status. Schor, in The Overspent American, argues that the increasing inequality during the 1980s and 1990s strongly accounts for increasing aspirations of income, increased consumption, decreased savings, and increased debt.

In the book Luxury Fever, Robert H. Frank argues that satisfaction with levels of income is much more strongly affected by how someone's income compares with others than its absolute level. Frank gives the example of instructions to a yacht architect by a customer – shipping magnate Stavros Niarchos – to make Niarchos' new yacht 50 feet longer than that of rival magnate Aristotle Onassis. Niarchos did not specify or reportedly even know the exact length of Onassis's yacht.

== Economic growth ==
=== Theories ===
The prevailing views about the role of inequality in the growth process has radically shifted in the past century.

The classical perspective, as expressed by Adam Smith, and others, suggests that inequality fosters the growth process. Specifically, since the aggregate saving increases with inequality due to higher propensity to save among the wealthy, the classical viewpoint suggests that inequality stimulates capital accumulation and therefore economic growth.

The Neoclassical perspective that is based on representative agent approach denies the role of inequality in the growth process. It suggests that the while the growth process may affect inequality, income distribution has no impact on the growth process.

The modern perspective which has emerged in the late 1980s suggests, in contrast, that income distribution has a significant impact on the growth process. The modern perspective, originated by Galor and Zeira, highlights the important role of heterogeneity in the determination of aggregate economic activity, and economic growth. In particular, Galor and Zeira argue that since credit markets are imperfect, inequality has an enduring impact on human capital formation, the level of income per capita, and the growth process. In contrast to the classical paradigm, which underlined the positive implications of inequality for capital formation and economic growth, Galor and Zeira argue that inequality has an adverse effect on human capital formation and the development process, in all but the very poor economies.

Later theoretical developments have reinforced the view that inequality has an adverse effect on the growth process. Specifically, Alesina and Rodrik and Persson and Tabellini advance a political economy mechanism and argue that inequality has a negative impact on economic development since it creates a pressure for distortionary redistributive policies that have an adverse effect on investment and economic growth.

A unified theory of inequality and growth that captures that changing role of inequality in the growth process offers a reconciliation between the conflicting predictions of classical viewpoint that maintained that inequality is beneficial for growth and the modern viewpoint that suggests that in the presence of credit market imperfections, inequality predominantly results in under investment in human capital and lower economic growth. This unified theory of inequality and growth, developed by Oded Galor and Omer Moav, suggests that the effect of inequality on the growth process has been reversed as human capital has replaced physical capital as the main engine of economic growth. In the initial phases of industrialization, when physical capital accumulation was the dominating source of economic growth, inequality boosted the development process by directing resources toward individuals with higher propensity to save. However, in later phases, as human capital became the main engine of economic growth, more equal distribution of income, in the presence of credit constraints, stimulated investment in human capital and economic growth.

=== Evidence ===
The reduced form empirical relationship between inequality and growth was studies by Alberto Alesina and Dani Rodrik, and Torsten Persson and Guido Tabellini. They find that inequality is negatively associated with economic growth in a cross-country analysis.

A 1999 review in the Journal of Economic Literature states high inequality lowers growth, perhaps because it increases social and political instability. The article also says:

Somewhat unusually for the growth literature, studies have tended to concur in finding a negative effect of high inequality on subsequent growth. The evidence has not been accepted by all: some writers point out the concentration of richer countries at the lower end of the inequality spectrum, the poor quality of the distribution data, and the lack of robustness to fixed effects specifications. At least, though, it has become extremely difficult to build a case that inequality is good for growth. This in itself represents a considerable advance. Given the indications that inequality is harmful for growth, attention has moved on to the likely mechanisms.... the literature seems to be moving ... towards an examination of the effects of inequality on fertility rates, investment in education, and political stability.

A 1992 World Bank report published in the Journal of Development Economics said that

Inequality is negatively, and robustly, correlated with growth. This result is not highly dependent upon assumptions about either the form of the growth regression or the measure of inequality...Although statistically significant, the magnitude of the relationship between inequality and growth is relatively small.

NYU economist William Baumol found that substantial inequality does not stimulate growth because poverty reduces labor force productivity. Economists Dierk Herzer and Sebastian Vollmer found that increased income inequality reduces economic growth, but growth itself increases income inequality.

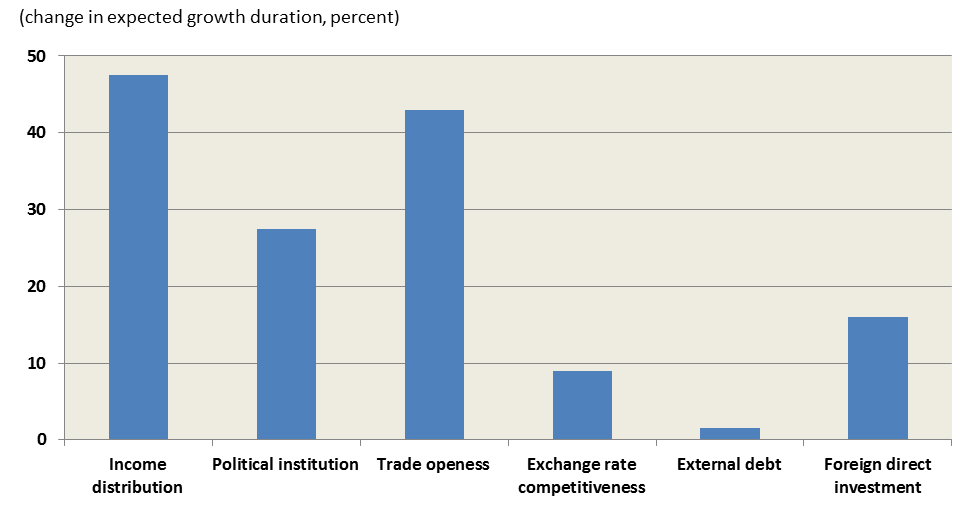
Berg and Ostry of the International Monetary Fund found that of the factors affecting the duration of growth spells (not the rate of growth) in developed and developing countries, income equality is more beneficial than trade openness, sound political institutions, or foreign investment.

A 1996 study by Perotti examined the channels through which inequality may affect economic growth. He showed that, in accordance with the credit market imperfection approach, inequality is associated with lower level of human capital formation (education, experience, and apprenticeship) and higher level of fertility, and thereby lower levels of growth. He found that inequality is associated with higher levels of redistributive taxation, which is associated with lower levels of growth from reductions in private savings and investment. Perotti concluded that, "more equal societies have lower fertility rates and higher rates of investment in education. Both are reflected in higher rates of growth. Also, very unequal societies tend to be politically and socially unstable, which is reflected in lower rates of investment and therefore growth."

Robert Barro reexamined the reduced form relationship between inequality on economic growth in a panel of countries. He argues that there is "little overall relation between income inequality and rates of growth and investment." However, his empirical strategy limits its applicability to the understanding of the relationship between inequality and growth for several reasons. First, his regression analysis control for education, fertility, investment, and it therefore excludes, by construction, the important effect of inequality on growth via education, fertility, and investment. His findings simply imply that inequality has no direct effect on growth beyond the important indirect effects through the main channels proposed in the literature. Second his study analyzes the effect of inequality on the average growth rate in the following 10 years. However, existing theories suggest that the effect of inequality will be observed much later, as is the case in human capital formation, for instance. Third, the empirical analysis does not account for biases that are generated by reverse causality and omitted variables.

A study of Swedish counties between 1960 and 2000 found a positive impact of inequality on growth with lead times of five years or less, but no correlation after ten years. Studies of larger data sets have found no correlations for any fixed lead time, and a negative impact on the duration of growth.

Some theories developed in the 1970s established possible avenues through which inequality may have a positive effect on economic development. According to a 1955 review, savings by the wealthy, if these increase with inequality, were thought to offset reduced consumer demand.

According to International Monetary Fund economists, inequality in wealth and income is negatively correlated with the duration of economic growth spells (not the rate of growth). High levels of inequality prevent not just economic prosperity, but also the quality of a country's institutions and high levels of education. According to IMF staff economists, "if the income share of the top 20 percent (the rich) increases, then GDP growth actually declines over the medium term, suggesting that the benefits do not trickle down. In contrast, an increase in the income share of the bottom 20 percent (the poor) is associated with higher GDP growth. The poor and the middle class matter the most for growth via a number of interrelated economic, social, and political channels."

However, further work done in 2015 by Sutirtha Bagchi and Jan Svejnar suggests that it is only inequality caused by corruption and cronyism that harms growth. When they control for the fact that some inequality is caused by billionaires using their political connections, then inequality caused by market forces does not seem to have an effect on growth.

Economist Joseph Stiglitz presented evidence in 2009 that both global inequality and inequality within countries prevent growth by limiting aggregate demand. Economist Branko Milanovic, wrote in 2001 that, "The view that income inequality harms growth – or that improved equality can help sustain growth – has become more widely held in recent years. ... The main reason for this shift is the increasing importance of human capital in development. When physical capital mattered most, savings and investments were key. Then it was important to have a large contingent of rich people who could save a greater proportion of their income than the poor and invest it in physical capital. But now that human capital is scarcer than machines, widespread education has become the secret to growth."

Studies on income inequality and growth have sometimes found evidence confirming the Kuznets curve hypothesis, which states that with economic development, inequality first increases, then decreases. Economist Thomas Piketty challenges this notion, claiming that from 1914 to 1945 wars and "violent economic and political shocks" reduced inequality. Moreover, Piketty argues that the "magical" Kuznets curve hypothesis, with its emphasis on the balancing of economic growth in the long run, cannot account for the significant increase in economic inequality throughout the developed world since the 1970s. However, Kristin Forbes found that if country-specific effects were eliminated by using panel estimation, then income inequality does have a significant positive relationship with economic growth. This relationship held across different "samples, variable definitions, and model specifications." Historian Walter Scheidel, who builds on Piketty's thesis that it has been violent shocks that have reduced inequality in The Great Leveler (2017), contends that "the preponderance of the evidence fails to support the idea of a systematic relationship between economic growth and income inequality as first envisioned by Kuznets sixty years ago."

A 2012 study published by Inyong Shin of Asia University found that economic inequality in the developed world has a very different effect on economic growth than in the developing world, saying that "higher inequality can retard growth in the early stage of economic development", but that "higher inequality can encourage growth in a near steady state".

A 2013 report on Nigeria suggests that growth has risen with increased income inequality. Some theories popular from the 1950s to 2011 argued that inequality had a positive effect on economic development. However, Abhijit Banerjee and Esther Duflo argue that analyses based on comparing yearly equality figures to yearly growth rates were misleading because it takes several years for effects to manifest as changes to economic growth. IMF economists found a strong association between lower levels of inequality in developing countries and sustained periods of economic growth. Developing countries with high inequality have "succeeded in initiating growth at high rates for a few years" but "longer growth spells are robustly associated with more equality in the income distribution."

An OECD study in 2015, found that internationally "countries where income inequality is decreasing grow faster than those with rising inequality", and noted that "a lack of investment in education by the poor is the main factor behind inequality hurting growth"

A 2016 meta-analysis found that "the effect of inequality on growth is negative and more pronounced in less developed countries than in rich countries", though the average impact on growth was not significant. The study also found that wealth, land and human capital inequality is more pernicious to growth than income inequality.

A 2017 study argued that there were both positive and negative effects of inequality: "When inequality is associated with political instability and social unrest, rent-seeking and distortive policies, lower capacities for investment in human capital, and a stagnant domestic market, it is mostly expected to harm long-run economic performance, as suggested by many authors. Accordingly, improving income distribution is expected to foster long-run economic growth, especially in low-income countries where the levels of inequality are usually very high. However, some degree of inequality can also be good, as has been theoretically argued in the literature and as empirically suggested in this study. A degree of inequality can play a beneficial role for economic growth when that inequality is driven by market forces and related to hard work and growth-enhancing incentives like risk taking, innovation, capital investment, and agglomeration economies. The challenge for policy makers is to control structural inequality, which reduces the country's capacities for economic development, while at the same time keeping in place those positive incentives that are also necessary for growth."

=== Mechanisms ===
The Galor and Zeira's model predicts that the effect of rising inequality on GDP per capita is negative in relatively rich countries but positive in poor countries. These testable predictions have been examined and confirmed empirically in recent studies. In particular, Brückner and Lederman test the prediction of the model by in the panel of countries during the period 1970–2010, by considering the impact of the interaction between the level of income inequality and the initial level of GDP per capita. In line with the predictions of the model, they find that at the 25th percentile of initial income in the world sample, a 1 percentage point increase in the Gini coefficient increases income per capita by 2.3%, whereas at the 75th percentile of initial income a 1 percentage point increase in the Gini coefficient decreases income per capita by -5.3%. Moreover, the proposed human capital mechanism that mediate the effect of inequality on growth in the Galor-Zeira model is also confirmed. Increases in income inequality increase human capital in poor countries but reduce it in high and middle-income countries.

This recent support for the predictions of the Galor-Zeira model is in line with earlier findings. Roberto Perotti showed that in accordance with the credit market imperfection approach, developed by Galor and Zeira, inequality is associated with lower level of human capital formation (education, experience, apprenticeship) and higher level of fertility, while lower level of human capital is associated with lower levels of economic growth. Princeton economist Roland Benabou's finds that the growth process of Korea and the Philippines "are broadly consistent with the credit-constrained human-capital accumulation hypothesis." In addition, Andrew Berg and Jonathan Ostry suggest that inequality seems to affect growth through human capital accumulation and fertility channels.

In contrast, Perotti argues that the political economy mechanism is not supported empirically. Inequality is associated with lower redistribution, and lower redistribution (under-investment in education and infrastructure) is associated with lower economic growth.

According to economist Branko Milanovic, while traditionally economists thought inequality was good for growth

The view that income inequality harms growth – or that improved equality can help sustain growth – has become more widely held in recent years. ... The main reason for this shift is the increasing importance of human capital in development. When physical capital mattered most, savings and investments were key. Then it was important to have a large contingent of rich people who could save a greater proportion of their income than the poor and invest it in physical capital. But now that human capital is scarcer than machines, widespread education has become the secret to growth.

"Broadly accessible education" is both difficult to achieve when income distribution is uneven and tends to reduce "income gaps between skilled and unskilled labor."

The sovereign-debt economic problems of the late twenty-oughts do not seem to be correlated to redistribution policies in Europe. With the exception of Ireland, the countries at risk of default in 2011 (Greece, Italy, Spain, Portugal) were notable for their high Gini-measured levels of income inequality compared to other European countries. As measured by the Gini index, Greece as of 2008 had more income inequality than the economically healthy Germany.

=== Equitable growth ===
While acknowledging the central role economic growth can potentially play in human development, poverty reduction and the achievement of the Millennium Development Goals, it is becoming widely understood among the development community that special efforts must be made to ensure poorer sections of society are able to participate in economic growth. The effect of economic growth on poverty reduction – the growth elasticity of poverty – can depend on the existing level of inequality. For instance, with low inequality a country with a growth rate of 2% per head and 40% of its population living in poverty, can halve poverty in ten years, but a country with high inequality would take nearly 60 years to achieve the same reduction. In the words of the Secretary-General of the United Nations Ban Ki-moon: "While economic growth is necessary, it is not sufficient for progress on reducing poverty." Competition policy intending to prevent companies from abusing market power contributes to inclusive growth.

== Environment ==
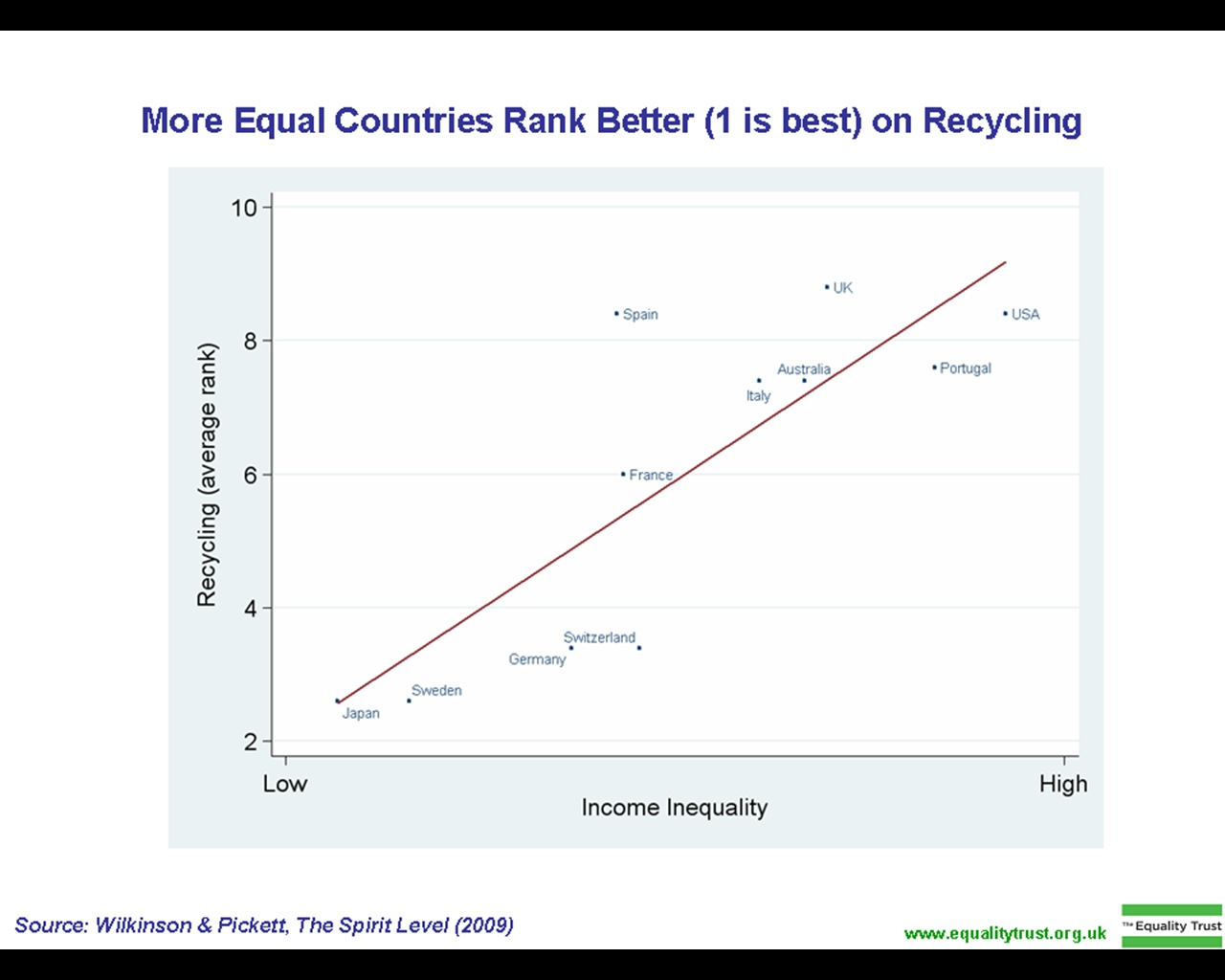
More equal countries rank better on recycling

Multiple arguments can be made about the relationship between poverty and the environment. In some cases, alleviating poverty can result in detrimental environmental affects or exacerbate degradation; the smaller the economic inequality, the more waste and pollution is created, resulting in many cases, in more environmental degradation. This can be explained by the fact that as the poor people in the society become more wealthy, it increases their yearly carbon emissions. This relation is expressed by the Environmental Kuznets Curve (EKC).{ In certain cases, with great economic inequality, there is nonetheless not more waste and pollution created as the waste/pollution is cleaned up better afterwards (water treatment, filtering, ... ) Also note that the whole of the increase in environmental degradation is the result of the increase of emissions per person being multiplied by a multiplier. If there were fewer people, however, this multiplier would be lower, and thus the amount of environmental degradation would be lower as well. As such, the current high level of population has a large impact on this as well. If (as WWF argued), population levels would start to drop to a sustainable level (1/3 of current levels, so about 2 billion people), human inequality can be addressed/corrected, while still not resulting in an increase of environmental damage.

On the other hand, other sources argue that alleviating poverty will reap positive progressions on the environment, especially with technological advances in energy efficiency. Urbanization, for instance, can "reduce the area in which humans impact the environment, thereby protecting nature elsewhere." Through concentration human societies, urbanized regions can allow for more allocated reserves for wildlife. Moreover, through urbanization, such societies have a higher standard of living that can promote environmental health with better food, technology, education, and more. In more unequal societies, there are stronger drivers for consumerism and stronger belief in free enterprise, and the rich also use a disproportionate amount of resources. Thus, in developed countries, inequality tends to accelerate resource consumption by all classes.

Research also shows that biodiversity loss is higher in countries or in US states with higher income inequality.

== Political outcomes ==
Higher income inequality led to less of all forms of social, cultural, and civic participation among the less wealthy. When inequality is higher the poor do not shift to less expensive forms of participation.

In 2015, a study by Lahtinen and Wass suggested that low social mobility reduces turnout among lower classes.

According to a 2017 review study in the Annual Review of Political Science by Stanford University political scientists Kenneth Scheve and David Stasavage, "the simple conjectures that democracy produces wealth equality and that wealth inequality leads to democratic failure are not supported by the evidence."

Some, such as Alberto Alesina and Dani Rodrik, argue that economic inequality creates demand for redistribution and the creation of welfare states. A 2014 study questions this relationship, finding that "inequality did not favour the development of social policy between 1880 and 1930. On the contrary, social policy developed more easily in countries that were previously more egalitarian, suggesting that unequal societies were in a sort of inequality trap, where inequality itself was an obstacle to redistribution."

== War, terrorism and political instability ==
One study finds a correlation between income inequality and increased levels of political instability. A 2016 study finds that interregional inequality increases terrorism. Another 2016 study finds that inequality between social classes increases the likelihood of coups but not civil wars. A lack of reliable data makes it difficult to study the relationship between inequality and political violence.

A 2014 study published in Ecological Economics said that economic stratification of society into "elites" and "masses" played a central role in the collapse of other advanced civilizations such as the Roman, Han, and Gupta empires. John A. Hobson, Rosa Luxemburg, and Vladimir Lenin argued that World War I was caused by inequality. In his 2016 book Global Inequality: A New Approach for the Age of Globalization, economist Branko Milanović says that there is credence to this argument.

== See also ==
- Involuntary unemployment
- List of countries by wealth per adult
