= Housing in Fortaleza, Brazil =

Fortaleza is a coastal city in northeastern Brazil, and the capital of Ceará province. It is the fourth largest city in Brazil, with a population of over 2.5 million people. Housing inequality has been an issue for years in Fortaleza. According to the United Nations, Fortaleza, "is the fifth most unequal city in the world" leaving the Brazilian government with an inequality crisis in their fifth largest city. "All over Brazil, the poor are pushed to the peripheries and ignored by both the higher classes and the government." Although the government is working on a solution with many non profits, the problem still exists. "The government continues to use other development projects, such as a tunnel and overpasses, as a way to remove community residents. Some families that were originally able to stay despite evictions are now being told they must also move."

The people in these low income communities rarely welcome the upper class into their homes and vice versa. "The local and state governments are absent from the neighborhoods and choose to funnel money into new shopping malls rather than building community centers that could help keep children and young adults off the streets." The upper class almost fears lower class citizens by building walls that surround their high rise apartments that contain 24/7 security. Tourism is on the rise in Brazil, since it has hosted the FIFA World Cup and soon the 2016 Summer Olympics. With so many tourists visiting this country, room needed to be made to build many new buildings and railways. " The sacrifice the urban poor are making for tourist accommodations and services has resulted in an amplification of the infamous socio-economic gap of Brazil and is becoming increasingly evident in the neighborhoods of Fortaleza."

== Effects of tourism ==
=== World Cup ===
For the World Cup, Brazil started moving their poor to the outer parts of town. The Brazilian government did not want any tourists seeing what the government considered disgraceful. 30,000 local people demonstrated against the World Cup because they did not want to be removed from their homes. The government would not have these protesters ruin their plans for the city. The demonstrators were tear gassed by the military. Some people were protesting politically asking for new spending priorities, especially for a country whose recent economic boom made global headlines. “By removing the poorest people from the inner cities, Fortaleza is causing segregation and social distinction”. "Contrary to the government and FIFA's story, local residents argue that this project is a form of social cleansing."

Although not all things from the World Cup brought negative effects. There was a boys' team that will represent Brazil in the “Street Child World Cup" during the World Cup. "The tournament will bring together teams of former street children from up to 20 countries for a 10-day event that aims to raise awareness of street children and give them a platform". Also a girls' tram from the “Ibiss Project” in Rio de Janeiro that was also recognized that gives the girls a chance to be a part of a society where they are actually seen and can demonstrate their talents. "But in Forteleza, as elsewhere in Brazil, among broad swaths of the population, the enthusiasm for the real thing is ebbing away as a nation takes a hard look at the priorities of its elite."

=== 2016 Olympics ===
"The impact of the protests against FIFA and government priorities in Brazil and in the international community remains a test for the future, particularly as the Olympics come to Brazil in 2016." With the Summer Olympics, Brazil is buying back the property from the poor to build hotels, stadia, and high speed railroads "must be built in a short period of time to accommodate tourists, yet the amount of free space is limited." The VLT project is the government's project to start building more railroads for more incoming tourists. This would allow more tourists to stay in Fortaleza and travel easily to Rio for the 2016 Olympics. The Brazilian government "has been using the VLT project, as a way to remove working-class residents without fair process or compensation". Some residents do not have government official documentation of ownership of their property, therefore the government is not giving the poor the true value of their property but much lower. "As part of the Movement to Fight in Defense of Housing (MLDM) in this large northeastern city, Sales and numerous other community members and activists successfully fought for the guarantee of compensation for their homes when initially none was offered."

== Non-profits ==
There are charity homes that social workers fill to make habitable with about 130,000 people living in extreme poverty. Many NGOs are trying to build high rise apartment building for those who are being evicted by the government for new nicer buildings for tourists. "Last year more than 350,000 people have emerged from extreme poverty-classified as living on seventy reais a month." The Ceara Institute of Research and Economic Strategy shows that more than 133,000 people were living in severe poverty in 2011. One third of these inhabitants live without sanitation and lack of adequate housing.

=== Bolsa Familia ===
Bolsa Familia, a social welfare program, has lifted millions of Brazilians out of poverty but many of the poorest don't even qualify for assistance because their children don't attend school or they have no fixed address. Things like this have happened in the past, the children will be bussed out of the city when visitors start to arrive. “For now, they exist in a twilight some of begging, stealing or working on the streets, at risk of falling into prostitution or drugs." Outside a row of breezeblock houses along a dirt road in Bom Jardim, one of the most violent favelas in Fortaleza, social worker Silvana Severo rips open the parcel of flour, beans and other food that she is bringing to a family. "”We do that to stop them selling on the food for drugs,”" she says”.

=== Movement to Fight in Defense of Housing (MLDM) ===
The MLDM was there to help lower income families in Fortaleza. These people did not know how to take control of their homes. "After MLDM demanded the government make an alternative route proposal for the VLT, the number of families facing displacement was reduced from an estimated 5,000 to about 2,500, housing activists said." With the help of the MLDM the people being moved from their homes were offered 400 reais instead of 200 before MLDM. "Another major gain for MLDM and the threatened communities was getting the government to promise alternative housing." This gave these families the option to choose government housing through Minha Casa Minha Vida (a federal housing program for the poor), this promise of housing comes with proof of a regular income where many of the lower income families do not have.

=== Urucum ===
Currently, there is a project started called Urucum. "Urucum’s project aims to promote and defend fundamental rights to adequate housing and transparency on the allocation of public resources, strengthening community resources by building partnerships with universities, other social organizations and the justice system, thus contributing to the democratization of the rule of law."

There are five ways in which this projects aims to call for action:

- Urucum intends on bringing the urban and civil communities together.
- Pulling communities and their social justice system into one.
- Building citizenship participation.
- Creating learning centers on human rights, to education on housing.
- Conduct actions to show the rest of the world how these people are truly living to have more of an impact to make sure something is done.

Urucum wants to make a positive impact on the lives of the poor. "By discussing the legitimacy and forced displacement in Fortaleza, by identifying the effectiveness of Brazilian law on access to information regarding the empowerment of affected social groups, and by utilizing institutional forms of resistance (the right to petition) against repeated violations of urban legislation, the Brazilian government’s disregard for the rule of law and lack of transparency will be challenged."
