= Housing inequality =

Unequal quality of housing in a society

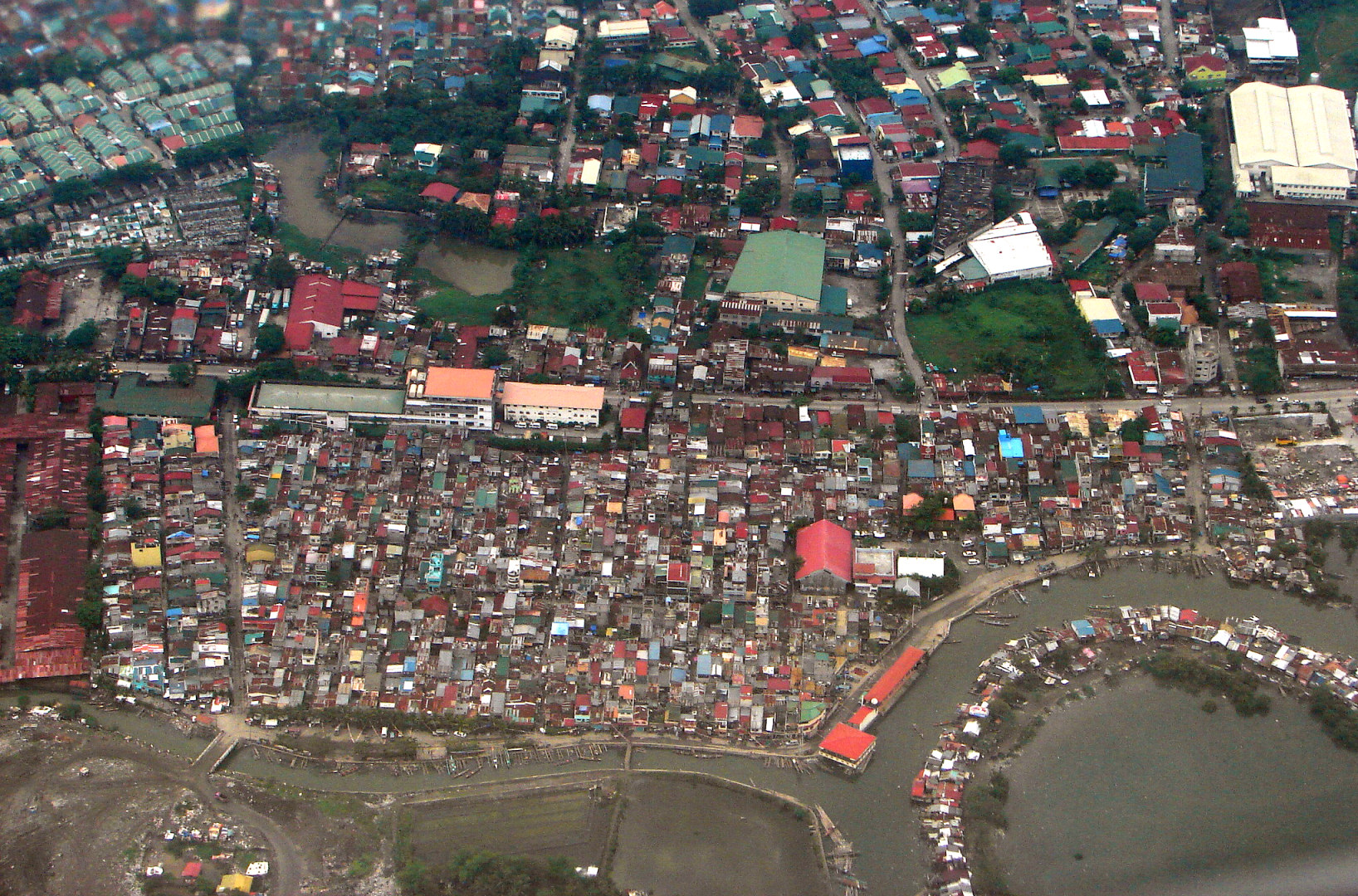
Aerial view of a slum in a suburb of Manila

Housing inequality is a disparity in the quality of housing in a society which is a form of economic inequality. The right to housing is recognized by many national constitutions, and the lack of adequate housing can have adverse consequences for an individual or a family. The term may apply regionally (across a geographic area), temporally (between one generation and the next) or culturally (between groups with different racial or social backgrounds). Housing inequality is directly related to racial, social, income and wealth inequality. It is often the result of market forces, discrimination and segregation.

It is also a cause and an effect of poverty. Residential inequality is especially relevant when considering Amartya Sen's definition of poverty as "the deprivation of core capabilities".

== Economic inequality ==
Disparities in housing explain variations in the conversion of income into human capabilities in different social climates. Income does not always translate into desirable outcomes such as healthcare, education, and housing quality is a factor which determines if those outcomes are readily available to an individual. According to economist and philosopher Amartya Sen, an individual's freedoms (or capabilities) are significant indicators of the kind of life they value or have a reason to value. As economic equality varies by economic system, historical period and society, so does housing inequality.

Economic inequality is a primary contributing factor to housing inequality. The distribution of wealth in a region affects who has access to housing, and at what level.

== Causes ==
Sociologist John Milton Yinger describes urban residential inequality as a result of housing-market forces. Yinger reasons that, all else being equal, housing becomes relatively more expensive as it is closer to work sites. Because poorer families often cannot afford to pay transportation costs, they may be forced to live in inner-city locations closer to employment opportunities. To win the spatial competition for housing near work sites, lower-income families must compensate for a high-priced location by accepting smaller housing, lower-quality housing or both. These market forces are subject to other socio-economic factors; no one cause can explain housing inequality. In the United States, Thomas Shapiro and Jessica Kenty-Drane point to the wealth gaps between African Americans and other groups as likely causes of the housing disparity between African Americans and the rest of the country. According to Shapiro and Kenty-Drane, historical and social obstacles (slavery and racial segregation) have prevented African Americans from securing and accumulating assets Including quality housing). Yinger also suggests that racial discrimination still plays a role in housing; black and Latino households must pay higher search costs, accept lower-quality housing and live in lower-quality neighborhoods due to discrimination. One study found that 20 percent of potential moves made by African American households and 17 percent of potential moves made by Latino households were discouraged by discrimination in the search process.

=== Redlining ===
A valiant effort to guide the country's deteriorating housing market amid the Great Depression, the (HOLC) 'Home Owners' Loan Corporation' was founded in 1933 by President Roosevelt. An integrated hierarchical system of stages appraised neighborhoods based on the data obtained from banks and real estate appraisers. The system consisted of 4 stages, A to D. A classified zones as pristine conditions providing minimal risk for banks. Leaving D judged as perilous and a higher investment risk.

HOLC generated a color-coded map to quickly identify an area's letter grade:

HOLC generated a color-coded map to quickly identify an area's letter grade:
Grade	Color	Label
A	Green	Best
B	Blue	Still Desirable
C	Yellow	Definitely Declining
D	Red	Hazardous

Grade D neighborhoods were later coined 'redlined areas'. Grade A areas held the highest percent change of loan approval, and B was 10 – 15% lower. The decline rate was high for zones D and C, they were not considered by conservative banks. When applying for a loan, your residency was more important than race. The race with a majority presence became the zone's identity and the dominant influence in the area. Hence the phrase when a person of color would move into the neighborhood, "Well there goes the neighborhood." This grading system continued to promote segregation as families and businesses who were thriving in Grade A areas wanted to keep their neighborhoods safe. Grades A and B residents developed a stigma believing residents of lower zones were trouble. This spread notion perpetuated by the government encouraged segregation.

=== Renting vs Buying ===
Income inequality is expressed in the amounts of poor people who cannot afford to buy a house and have to turn to renting a house/apartment instead. In 2017, it was noted that 46% of working renters would use more than 30% of their income for housing costs. The decrease in income and the increase in rent prices leads to double precarity, which causes housing and employment insecurity. In the beginning of 2022, home prices in the United States went up by 9 percent, while apartment prices increased between 12 and 20 percent since the previous year. The rise in housing prices are making new homeowners become rentholders, causing the amount of rentholders to increase, due to the lack of affordable housing. The number of homeowners is decreasing with the constant soaring of rent and down payments and the inability to save enough to transition from a renter to a home buyer.

=== COVID-19 pandemic ===
In 2020, the pandemic spread across the world causing many people to become unemployed leading to a crisis in the housing market. The United States issued a Federal Eviction Moratorium, which provided federal aid for those in need and provided housing security during the pandemic. Once the eviction moratorium was lifted, a lot of people lost their homes and had to relocate into different areas in search of jobs. The housing market was at an all-time high in construction, in 2021 the single family units hit 1.1 million while the multi-family units hit 470,000, leading it to be the highest amount of housing construction since 1973. The prices of these units are less than modest and exceed the typical median rent. Due to the pandemic, the amount of labor shortages, lack of adequate materials and the runup pricing for products only heightens the rise in housing prices creating instability for homeowners and renters.

== Effects ==
The most direct effect of housing inequality is an inequality of neighborhood amenities, which include the condition of surrounding houses, the availability of social networks, the amount of air pollution, the crime rate, and the quality of local schools. A neighborhood with a certain quality of amenities typically includes individual residences of corresponding quality. Those with lower incomes usually live in areas with poor amenities to win the spatial competition for housing. A neighborhood amenity includes satisfaction derived from living in a nice area, and many studies suggest that growing up in a high-poverty neighborhood affects social and economic outcomes later in life.

Another way the poor compete for housing is by renting homes rather than buying them, which furthers the negative effects of housing inequality by restricting access to household wealth.

=== Homeownership and Wealth Accumulation ===
Younger households benefit from homeownership, as it allows them to accumulate wealth early in their careers. This initial wealth accumulation is based on its own. Later in life, accumulated home equity can be used for unexpected expenses, funding children's education, or assisting retirement.

==== Racial Disparities and the Wealth Gap ====
Racial differences are a crucial component of housing inequality. The racial wealth gap affects the economic security of Americans throughout the United States. These disparities have intergenerational effects, affecting not only the current generation but also the future. In 2019, the median net wealth amongst Black households was seen at $24,000, while white households were seen at $190,000, almost 8 times more than Black households. The contrast amongst these numbers makes it hard for minorities to develop and accumulate wealth through homeownership.

==== Discriminatory Lending Practices ====
The Great Recession exposed discriminatory lending practices that disproportionately affect minorities. These practices hindered wealth accumulation and caused the racial wealth gap. Addressing housing inequality is essential for promoting economic fairness and ensuring a more equitable economy. The effects of housing inequality directly influence generational wealth, residually reducing financial opportunities and well-being for families across different age groups.

==== Immediate Impact on Quality of Life ====
Equalization of these factors (housing disparities) would directly enhance Black Americans' quality of life.

Establish a federal postal bank that provides access to low-cost, low-risk financial services to Black households. This can expand financial inclusion and reduce the disparities in financial access and literacy.

== Proposed remedies ==
Proposals to remedy the adverse effects of housing inequality include:

- Subsidized housing, also known as affordable housing. Subsidized housing includes:
  - Co-operative housing: Type of residential housing option that is corporation. Owners do not outright own their units.
  - Non-profit housing: Housing that is intended for low income persons or families, owned by nonprofit organizations. The non profit organizations may receive funding from government grants, donations, or other fundraising efforts.
  - Direct housing: Housing where persons or families receive housing assistance directly from the government. Help can come in the form of subsides, vouchers, and other public housing units.
  - Public housing: Form of housing where the property is owned by the government. There are different types of public housing, from single family houses to high rise apartments.
  - Rent supplements: Short term income assistance for people who cannot afford the costs of their current housing.
- Private-sector housing - U.S. landlords who provide adequate housing
- Fair-lending enforcement - Lenders are expected to not discriminate against borrowers because of family status, race, originality, gender, and color
- Scattered-site housing - A housing system where rent is based on household income This system is popular in Philadelphia in the U.S.
- Investment in local school systems - According to Ruel Hamilton, financially supporting schools in impoverished areas has a ripple effect which improves school ratings and property values for owners of inner-city housing projects.
- Land value tax - A progressive tax on land ownership

== Why should employers care about Housing? ==
High housing costs can make it difficult for employers to attract and retain workers, particularly for lower-wage roles. This reduces productivity and competitiveness. Employers can attract and retain diverse individuals at all levels. Housing instability can hinder employee productivity, well-being, and retention. Long commutes can lead to stress, depression, and financial issues for workers. Employers should be aware of, care about, and provide affordable housing. Employers can benefit from advocating for and investing in affordable housing policies and programs, which can be beneficial for their workforce and the local economy. Affordable housing can improve the quality of life, access to employment, and economic growth.

According to the Pew Research Center, approximately 63% of American adults living in urban areas stated that the diminished availability of affordable housing is a major issue in their community. This is comparable to the 46% of adults surveyed in Suburban residencies and 40% of adult residents from rural regions who share the same perception of the lack of available affordable housing.

=== Reasons businesses locate in expensive areas ===
- Talent Attraction and Retention
  - High-cost areas tend to have a population of skilled workers due to factors such as universities, research centers, and cultural facilities. Employers want to access this talent pool and are willing to operate in expensive housing markets to attract and retain skilled workers.
- Networking
  - Market Access and Visibility are synonymous with the Proximity to Clients and Partners:
  - Many businesses, particularly in finance, technology, and consulting, benefit from being close to their clients, suppliers, and partners.
  - Collaborative relationships are often established in urban areas with the higher cost of housing. Businesses want to be part of these networks to foster collaborations and growth.
  - Prime locations in expensive housing markets provide better visibility and access to customers.
  - Being in the center of a city can enhance a company's brand and attract more customers, which also invites opportunities for networking events, conferences, and industry conventions. Networking opportunities are beneficial for establishing successful collaborations and growth.
- Business Ecosystems:
  - Clusters of related businesses often occur in high-cost areas.
  - Being part of such an ecosystem can lead to synergies, partnerships, and innovation.
  - Infrastructure and Amenities:
  - Urban centers with expensive housing typically possess excellent infrastructure, such as transportation, communication, and utilities.

It is advantageous to access amenities such as restaurants, entertainment, and cultural events.

== Inequality ==
Although the focus of housing inequality has changed with time, contemporary international analyses tend to center on urbanization and the move to metropolitan areas. International housing inequality is largely characterized by urban disparities. A 2007 UN-HABITAT report estimated that over one billion people worldwide lived in slums at the time, a figure expected to double by 2030.

In developing countries, housing inequality is increasingly caused by rural-to-urban migration, increasing urban poverty and inequality, insecure tenure and globalization. All these factors contribute to the creation and continuation of slums in poorer areas of the world. One proposed solution is slum upgrading.

=== Housing Hardship Trends ===
Initially, Black and Hispanic Americans experienced a higher rate of housing hardship than white individuals. Among minority respondents, eviction/foreclosure risks and delayed rent/mortgage payments were more prevalent. However, housing inequality has decreased, not because minority groups' situations improved significantly, but because everyone became more disadvantaged. White respondents are now increasingly experiencing housing instability. Currently, 61 percent of all respondents have experienced housing difficulties at some point during the pandemic, with some becoming "long-haulers" in this situation.

=== Long-Haulers and Housing Inequality ===
The term "long-haulers" refers to individuals who frequently experience housing difficulties over an extended period. Despite some reduction in housing-related inequality, the overall situation remains uncertain for many families.

=== Racial Biased Real Estate Apprasials ===
A real estate appraisal is the valuation of a property in the current housing market. The valuation of property depends heavily on the location of the home and the condition it is found in. In recent research, there has been a constant price devaluing of Black homes and neighborhoods in comparison to non-Black homes and neighborhoods. In a 2018 study, it was found that homes in U.S. metropolitan neighborhoods where the shared population is 50 percent Black are priced around 50 percent less than homes in neighborhoods without any Black residents. The bias against Black homes and neighborhoods continues at a 4.4 percent level causing those homes to be under-appraised. As well as, Black homes are 1.9 times more likely to be priced under contract value than white neighborhoods. The neighborhoods where the majority of the population is Latino and Asian American residents will most likely receive under-appraisals in comparison to the white neighborhoods.

== See also ==
- Effects of economic inequality
- Homelessness
- Housing discrimination in the United States
- Real estate bubble
- Urbanization
