= Nelson W. Polsby =

American political scientist (1934–2007)

- Born: Nelson Woolf Polsby; October 24, 1934; Norwich, Connecticut, US
- Died: February 6, 2007 (aged 72); Berkeley, California, US
- Education: Johns Hopkins University, Yale University, Brown University
- Scientific career
- Fields: Political science
- Workplaces: University of California, Berkeley
- Doctoral advisor: Robert Dahl

Nelson Woolf Polsby (October 25, 1934 – February 6, 2007) was an American political scientist. He specialized in the study of the United States presidency, the United States Congress and how governmental policies and practices evolve.

Polsby was the Heller Professor of Political Science at the University of California, Berkeley. He was the editor of the American Political Science Review from 1971 – 1977 and the founding editor of the Annual Review of Political Science from 1998 until his death in 2007.

== Education ==
Polsby was born in Norwich, Connecticut. He attended Pomfret School, a private school in Pomfret, Connecticut. His family lived in Washington, D.C. for a time where Polsby would sit and observe sessions of Congress. Polsby became interested in public opinion and its influence on elections as Joseph R. McCarthy became more powerful in Washington during the 1940s and early 1950s.

Polsby studied for his undergraduate degree at Johns Hopkins University in 1956 and a master's degree from Brown University in 1957. He then went to Yale University where he studied with Robert Dahl. Some of his fellow students include Raymond Wolfinger and Aaron Wildavsky. He got a master's degree and a doctoral degree from Yale in 1958 and 1961. Polsby later served on Yale University's council (1978-2000) and was the president from 1986-1993.

== Career ==
Polsby was a teacher at the University of Wisconsin, Madison (1960–61) and Wesleyan University (1961-1968). He then moved to California and started teaching at the University of California, Berkeley in 1967. From 1988 to 1999, he was director of Berkeley's Institute of Governmental Studies (IGS). He was a member of the Council on Foreign Relations as well as a fellow of the American Academy of Arts and Sciences, the American Association for the Advancement of Science and the National Academy of Public Administration.

During the 1960s Polsby did extensive field work and examined the "human nature" of Congress and the historical implications of recurrent calls for change on the institution. He was one of several influential political scientists who changed the field. His paper "The Institutionalization of the U.S. House of Representatives" (1968) was considered "one of the 20 most influential articles published in the American Political Science Review."

Polsby was the author of numerous articles on American politics. He wrote articles for academic journals and did political commentary for newspapers and magazines. He sometimes wrote under the pseudonym Arthur Clun. He wrote and edited more than 20 books which includes Political Innovation in America (1984), Congress and the Presidency (1986) and How Congress Evolves (2004). In 1997, he was commissioned by the non-partisan Twentieth Century Fund to write The New Federalist Papers: Essays in Defense of the Constitution with Alan Brinkley and Kathleen M. Sullivan. In addition to his work on American politics, he co-wrote British Government and its Discontents. (1981) with Geoffrey Peter Smith.

Polsby often used humor to make his political writing more accessible and was frequently quoted by reporters. He is credited with reshaping both academic understanding and public awareness of governmental institutions.

Polsby died February 6, 2007, in Berkeley, California, from heart disease.

== Awards ==
- 1985, Wilbur Cross Medal, Yale University
- 2003, Frank Goodnow Award for distinguished service, American Political Science Association (APSA)
- Honorary degree, University of Liverpool
- Honorary degree, Oxford University

== Publications ==
- Polsby, Nelson Woolf (1963). Community power and political theory. New Haven: Yale University Press. ISBN 978-0300008326.
- Polsby, Nelson W. (1983). Consequences of party reform. Oxford: Oxford University Press. ISBN 978-0195033151.
- Polsby, Nelson W. (1984). Political innovation in America : the politics of policy initiation. New Haven: Yale University Press. ISBN 9780300030891.
- Polsby, Nelson W. (1986). Congress and the presidency (4th ed.). Englewood Cliffs, N.J.: Prentice Hall. ISBN 0131677195.
- Brinkley, Alan; Polsby, Nelson W.; Sullivan, Kathleen M. (1997). New Federalist papers : essays in defense of the Constitution. New York: Norton. ISBN 978-0393317374.
