= Annual Review of Political Science =

Academic journal

- Discipline: Political science
- Language: English
- Edited by: Margaret Levi; David Stasavage

Publication details
- History: 1998–present, 28 years old
- Publisher: Annual Reviews (US)
- Frequency: Annually
- Open access: Subscribe to Open
- Impact factor: 8.6 (2025)

Standard abbreviations
- ISO 4: Annu. Rev. Political Sci.

Indexing
- ISSN: 1094-2939 (print); 1545-1577 (web)
- LCCN: 98643699
- OCLC no.: 42836185

Links
- Journal homepage

Annual Review of Political Science is an annual peer-reviewed academic journal published by Annual Reviews (AR), covering significant developments in the field of political science, including political theory and philosophy, international relations, political economy, political behavior, American and comparative politics, public administration and policy, and methodology. It was established in 1998. Its current editors are Margaret Levi and David Stasavage.

Beginning in 2020, the Annual Review of Political Science is published open access under the Subscribe to Open (S2O) publishing model. As of 2026, Journal Citation Reports gives the journal a 2025 impact factor of 8.6, ranking it first of 332 journal titles in the category "Political Science".

== History ==
The Annual Review of Political Science was first published in 1998 by Annual Reviews (AR), a nonprofit organization whose stated mission is to synthesize knowledge "for the progress of science and the benefit of society." The journal's first editor was Nelson W. Polsby. Upon Polsby's death in 2007, editorship passed to Margaret Levi. She was joined by Nancy L. Rosenblum, who is credited as co-editor for issues from 2015 to 2023. As of July 2023, Rosenblum was succeeded as co-editor by David Stasavage.

Until 2016, the journal was published both in print and online. Beginning in 2017, it is only published online. Under AR's Subscribe to Open publishing model, the 2020 volume of the Annual Review of Political Science was published open access, a first for the journal.

The journal covers significant developments in political science, including political philosophy, international relations, political behavior, political economy, comparative politics, politics of the United States, and content relating to the policy and methodology of public administration.

== Editorial processes ==
The Annual Review of Political Science is helmed by the editor or co-editors. The editors are assisted by the editorial committee, which includes associate editors, regular members, and occasionally guest editors. Guest members participate at the invitation of the editors, and serve terms of one year. All other members of the editorial committee are appointed by the AR board of directors and serve five-year terms. The editorial committee determines which topics should be included in each volume and solicits reviews from qualified authors. Unsolicited manuscripts are not accepted. Peer review of accepted manuscripts is undertaken by the editorial committee.

== See also ==
- List of political science journals
