= Thomas D. Griffith =

- Education: Brown University; Harvard Law School
- Occupations: Professor, USC Gould School of Law

Thomas D. Griffith is an American academic, an expert on taxation and tax law, and John B. Milliken Professor of Taxation at the USC Gould School of Law.

== Career ==
Griffith was a graduate of Brown University and Harvard Law School, before joining the law firm of Hill & Barlow in Boston, as an associate. Griffith became a professor at the USC Gould School of Law in 1984. He has also taught at NYU, and was a former editor of the Harvard Law Review.

Griffith won the William A. Rutter Distinguished Teaching Award in 2009.

== Selected publications ==
=== Books ===
- Problems in Federal Income Taxation (1996)
- Federal Income Tax: Examples and Explanations, 5th ed. (2008).

=== Articles ===
- "Gangs, Schools and Stereotypes" (2004)
- "Progressive Taxation and Happiness" (2004)
- "Taxing Sunny Days: Adjusting Taxes for Regional Living Costs and Amenities" (2003)
- "Habitual Offender Statutes and Criminal Deterrence" (2001)
- "Demonizing Youth" (2001)
- "Diversity and the Law School" (2000)
- "Did 'Three Strikes' Cause the Recent Drop in California Crime?: An Analysis of the California Attorney General's Report" (1998)
- "Do Three Strikes Laws Make Sense? Habitual Offender Statutes and Criminal Incapacitation" (1998)
- "Efficient Taxation of Mixed Personal and Business Expenses." 41 UCLA Law Review 1769 (1994)
- "Should 'Tax Norms' be Abandoned? Rethinking Tax Policy Analysis and the Taxation of Personal Injury Recoveries" (1993)
- "Is the Debate Between an Income Tax and a Consumption Tax a Debate About Risk? Does it Matter?" (1992)
- "Theories of Personal Deductions in the Income Tax." 40 Hastings Law Journal 343 (1989)
- "Social Welfare and the Rate Structure: A New Look at Progressive Taxation" (1987).
