= Kenneth Scheve =

American political economist

Kenneth Frederick Scheve Jr. is an American political economist.

Scheve earned a degree in economics at the University of Notre Dame in 1990, then worked in the finance sector. He completed a doctorate in political science at Harvard University in 2000, where his doctoral thesis, Casting Votes in the Global Economy: Public Opinion and Voting Behavior in Open Economies, was advised by James E. Alt, Torben Iversen, and Gary King. Scheve accepted an assistant professorship in political science at Yale University from 2001 to 2004, when he was named associate professor of public policy at the University of Michigan. Scheve returned to Yale as full professor of political science in 2006, then left to teach at Stanford University in 2012. He later rejoined the Yale faculty as Dean Acheson Professor of Political Science and Global Affairs. In 2020, Scheve was elected a member of the American Academy of Arts and Sciences. On May 14, 2025, he returned to his undergraduate alma mater as the I.A. O'Shaughnessy Dean of the College of Arts and Letters and the Keough-Hesburgh Professor of Political Science at the University of Notre Dame.

== Selected publications ==
- Scheve, Kenneth; Stasavage, David (2016). Taxing the Rich: A History of Fiscal Fairness in the United States and Europe. Princeton University Press. ISBN 9780691165455.
