= David Stasavage =

American political scientist

- Alma mater: Cornell University; Harvard University
- Occupation: Political scientist, university teacher
- Employer: London School of Economics (1999–2005); New York University
- Awards: Fellow of the American Academy of Arts and Sciences (2015)
- Website: stasavage.com

David Stasavage is an American political scientist known for his work on democracy and political economy. He is the Dean for the Social Sciences and the Julius Silver Professor at New York University's Department of Politics and an affiliated professor in NYU's School of Law. He was elected to the American Academy of Arts and Sciences in 2015.

== Education and early career ==
Stasavage earned a bachelor's degree from Cornell University in 1989, then obtained his doctorate from Harvard University in 1995. He subsequently went to Europe, working successively for the World Bank, the Organisation for Economic Co-operation and Development, the Centre for the Study of African Economies, and the Bank of England.

== Academic career ==
Stasavage began teaching as a faculty associate within the London School of Economics in 1999. By 2005, his final year at the LSE, Stasavage had acquired the rank of reader. Stasavage returned to the United States in 2006, as an associate professor at New York University. In 2009, Stasavage was appointed to a full professorship. Since 2015, he has served as Julius Silver Professor of Politics. Stasavage was later appointed dean for the social sciences.

Stasavage carries out data driven research on the historical development of state institutions including Western Europe and Africa. He has written on topics including democracy, political economy, development economics, public credit, central banks, education policy, welfare, and income inequality.

In Public Debt and the Birth of the Democratic State: France and Great Britain, 1688-1789 (Cambridge University Press, 2003), Stasavage modeled connections between public debt and representative assemblies and their relationships with the fiscal credibility of governments in the eighteenth century. In States of Credit: Size, Power, and the Development of European Polities (Princeton University Press, 2011) he further examined the development of representative assemblies and of public borrowing in Europe, during the medieval and early modern eras. In 2012, States of Credit won the Award for the Best Book in European Politics and Society from Section 21 (European Politics and Society) of the American Political Science Association.

In Taxing the Rich (Princeton University Press, 2016) Stasavage and Kenneth F. Scheve examined democracy and taxation, with particular attention to conceptions of fairness and possible mechanisms underlying progressive taxation. In The Decline and Rise of Democracy: A Global History from Antiquity to Today (Princeton University Press, 2020) he takes an institutional approach to the interaction of state and societal actors, to identify and examine the development of both early and modern democracies.

== Honors ==
In 2015, Stasavage was elected a member of the American Academy of Arts and Sciences. In July 2023, Stasavage became co-editor of the Annual Review of Political Science.

== Selected publications ==
=== Books ===
- Stasavage, David (2004). Public Debt and the Birth of the Democratic State. Cambridge University Press. doi:10.1017/CBO9780511510557. ISBN 9780511510557.
- Stasavage, David (2011). States of Credit: Size, Power, and the Development of European Polities. Princeton University Press. ISBN 9780691140575.
- Scheve, Kenneth; Stasavage, David (2016). Taxing the Rich: A History of Fiscal Fairness in the United States and Europe. Princeton University Press. ISBN 9780691165455.
- Stasavage, David (2020). The Decline and Rise of Democracy: A Global History from Antiquity to Today. Princeton University Press. ISBN 9780691177465.

=== Papers ===
- Keefer, Philip; Stasavage, David (August 2003). "The Limits of Delegation: Veto Players, Central Bank Independence, and the Credibility of Monetary Policy". American Political Science Review. 97 (3): 407–423. doi:10.1017/S0003055403000777. ISSN 1537-5943. S2CID 14733499.
- Stasavage, David (October 2004). "Open-Door or Closed-Door? Transparency in Domestic and International Bargaining". International Organization. 58 (4). doi:10.1017/S0020818304040214. ISSN 0020-8183. S2CID 16709125.
- Stasavage, David (April 2005). "Democracy and Education Spending in Africa". American Journal of Political Science. 49 (2): 343–358. doi:10.1111/j.0092-5853.2005.00127.x.
- Scheve, Kenneth; Stasavage, David (July 26, 2006). "Religion and Preferences for Social Insurance". Quarterly Journal of Political Science. 1 (3): 255–286. doi:10.1561/100.00005052.
- Stasavage, David (May 11, 2016). "Representation and Consent: Why They Arose in Europe and Not Elsewhere". Annual Review of Political Science. 19 (1): 145–162. doi:10.1146/annurev-polisci-043014-105648. ISSN 1094-2939.
- Scheve, Kenneth; Stasavage, David (May 11, 2017). "Wealth Inequality and Democracy". Annual Review of Political Science. 20 (1): 451–468. doi:10.1146/annurev-polisci-061014-101840. ISSN 1094-2939.
