= Decisive victory =

Type of military victory

A decisive victory is a military victory in battle that definitively resolves the objective being fought over, ending one stage of the conflict and beginning another stage. Until a decisive victory is achieved, conflict over the competing objectives will continue.

== Definitions ==
The phrases "decisive battle" and "decisive victory" have evolved over time, as the methods and scope of wars themselves changed. More modernly, as armies, wars and theaters of operation expanded—so that the gestalt (i.e., a result which is greater than the sum total—see synergy) of the overall venture was more definitive—the phrase "lost its meaning." The meaning is ephemeral, like the difference between “strategy” and "tactics”.

In Defining and Achieving Decisive Victory, Colin Gray defined an operational decisive victory as "a victory which decides the outcome to a campaign, though not necessarily to the war as a whole".

The Battle of Midway is often cited as a decisive operational victory for the US despite the fact that the Pacific War ended more than three years later with the decisive strategic victory of the atomic bombings of Hiroshima and Nagasaki, which directly led to the Japanese surrender; this is because the Midway operation represented the destruction of the majority of the IJN's offensive carrier forces, which decisively stopped both the IJN's string of unbroken victories in combat and their plans to expand eastward into Midway Island, Hawaii, the Aleutian Islands and potentially the US mainland. During this period, the US Navy expanded greatly, and the IJN was never able to regain their former strength, making the victory decisive in terms of determining the future operational shape of the battles for the Pacific.

On the tactical scale, the attack on Pearl Harbor is cited as a decisive victory, as it destroyed the entirety of the US Pacific battleship fleet and neutralized Pearl Harbor's ability to retaliate in one fell swoop, thus resolving the issue of whether the battleships (which the Japanese inaccurately saw as the greatest threat) would present a threat to Japanese expansion in the West. A tactically decisive victory is no substitute for a decisive victory on a larger scale, since the strategic issue of control of the Pacific remained very much in question, and the war was later resolved decisively in the Allies' favor (see above) via aircraft carriers and bombers instead of battleships.

Writing in Military Review, Thomas Goss attributes the popularity of the closely related term "decisive battle" to Sir Edward Creasy and his 1851 book, The Fifteen Decisive Battles of the World. Goss recounts a variety of different definitions for the term used by historians and military leaders (neither of which typically define the term before using it): a battle that (1) achieves its operational objectives; (2) ends the conflict because one side has achieved its strategic objectives, or; (3) directly ends the conflict and results in a lasting peace between the belligerents. He concludes that "A decisive battle must directly lead to a rapid resolution of the contested political issues because the results on the battlefield caused both sides to agree that a decision had been reached."

Admiral Mahan emphasized that naval operations were chiefly to be won by decisive battles and blockade.

== See also ==
- Kantai Kessen
- Pyrrhic victory
- Strategic victory
- Tactical victory
- Edward Shepherd Creasy, The Fifteen Decisive Battles of the World: from Marathon to Waterloo (1851)
