= Battle =

Military engagement

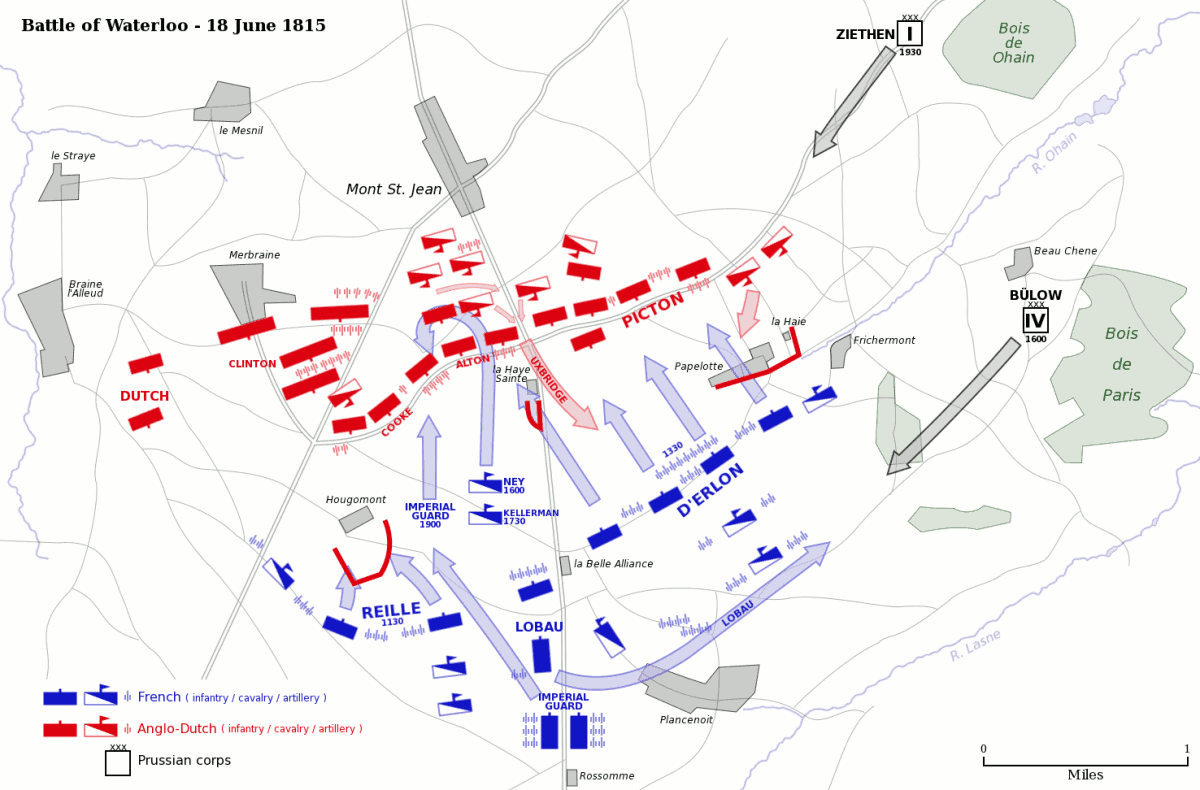
British (red) and French (blue) armies begin engagement of the decisive Battle of Waterloo, with Prussian forces (gray) arriving from the northeast

Broadly, a battle is an occurrence of combat in warfare between opposing military units of any number or size; more specifically, it is a series of military engagements that is well defined in duration, area, and force commitment. A war usually consists of multiple battles. An engagement with only limited commitment between the forces and without decisive results is sometimes called a skirmish.

The word "battle" can also be used infrequently to refer to an entire operational campaign, although this usage greatly diverges from its conventional or customary meaning. Generally, the word "battle" is used for such campaigns if referring to a protracted combat encounter in which either one or both of the combatants had the same methods, resources, and strategic objectives throughout the encounter. Some prominent examples of this would be the Battle of the Atlantic, Battle of Britain, and the Battle of France, all in World War II.

Wars and military campaigns are guided by military strategy, whereas battles take place on a level of planning and execution known as operational mobility. German strategist Carl von Clausewitz stated that "the employment of battles ... to achieve the object of war" was the essence of strategy.

== Etymology ==
Battle is a loanword from the Old French bataille, first attested in 1297, from Late Latin battualia, meaning "exercise of soldiers and gladiators in fighting and fencing", from Late Latin (taken from Germanic) battuere "beat", from which the English word battery is also derived via Middle English batri.

== Characteristics ==
The defining characteristic of the fight as a concept in military science has changed with the variations in the organisation, employment and technology of military forces. The English military historian John Keegan suggested an ideal definition of battle as "something which happens between two armies leading to the moral then physical disintegration of one or the other of them" but the origins and outcomes of battles can rarely be summarized so neatly. Battle in the 20th and 21st centuries is defined as the combat between large components of the forces in a military campaign, used to achieve military objectives. Where the duration of the battle is longer than a week, it is often for reasons of planning called an operation. Battles can be planned, encountered or forced by one side when the other is unable to withdraw from combat.

A battle always has as its purpose the reaching of a mission goal by use of military force. A victory in the battle is achieved when one of the opposing sides forces the other to abandon its mission and surrender its forces, routs the other (i.e., forces it to retreat or renders it militarily ineffective for further combat operations) or annihilates the latter, resulting in their deaths or capture. A battle may end in a Pyrrhic victory, which ultimately favors the defeated party. If no resolution is reached in a battle, it can result in a stalemate. A conflict in which one side is unwilling to reach a decision by a direct battle using conventional warfare often becomes an insurgency.

Until the 19th century the majority of battles were of short duration, many lasting a part of a day. (The Battle of Preston (1648), the Battle of Nations (1813) and the Battle of Gettysburg (1863) were exceptional in lasting three days.) This was mainly due to the difficulty of supplying armies in the field or conducting night operations. The means of prolonging a battle was typically with siege warfare. Improvements in transport and the sudden evolving of trench warfare, with its siege-like nature during the First World War in the 20th century, lengthened the duration of battles to days and weeks. This created the requirement for unit rotation to prevent combat fatigue, with troops preferably not remaining in a combat area of operations for more than a month.

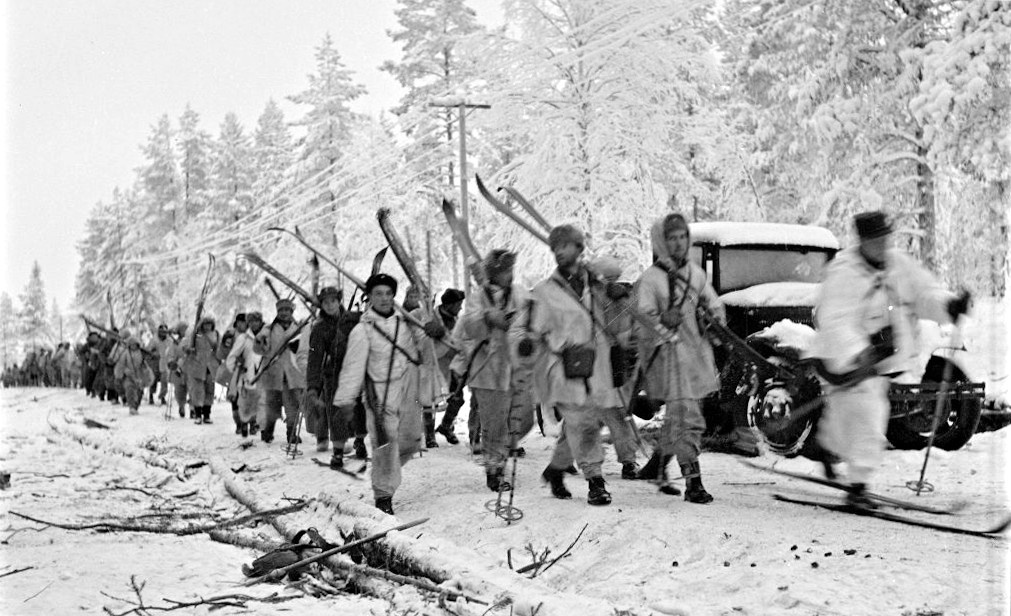
Finnish soldiers on the Raate Road during the Winter War

The use of the term "battle" in military history has led to its misuse when referring to almost any scale of combat, notably by strategic forces involving hundreds of thousands of troops that may be engaged in either one battle at a time (Battle of Leipzig) or operations (Battle of Wuhan). The space a battle occupies depends on the range of the weapons of the combatants. A "battle" in this broader sense may be of long duration and take place over a large area, as in the case of the Battle of Britain or the Battle of the Atlantic. Until the advent of artillery and aircraft, battles were fought with the two sides within sight, if not reach, of each other. The depth of the battlefield has also increased in modern warfare with inclusion of the supporting units in the rear areas; supply, artillery, medical personnel etc. often outnumber the front-line combat troops.

Battles are made up of a multitude of individual combats, skirmishes and small engagements and the combatants will usually only experience a small part of the battle. To the infantryman, there may be little to distinguish between combat as part of a minor raid or a big offensive, nor is it likely that he anticipates the future course of the battle; few of the British infantry who went over the top on the first day on the Somme, 1 July 1916, would have anticipated that the battle would last five months. Some of the Allied infantry who had just dealt a crushing defeat to the French at the Battle of Waterloo fully expected to have to fight again the next day (at the Battle of Wavre).

== Battlespace ==
Battlespace is a unified strategic concept to integrate and combine armed forces for the military theatre of operations, including air, information, land, sea and space. It includes the environment, factors and conditions that must be understood to apply combat power, protect the force or complete the mission, comprising enemy and friendly armed forces; facilities; weather; terrain; and the electromagnetic spectrum.

== Factors ==
Battles are decided by various factors, the number and quality of combatants and equipment, the skill of commanders and terrain are among the most prominent. Weapons and armour can be decisive; on many occasions armies have achieved victory through more advanced weapons than those of their opponents. An extreme example was in the Battle of Omdurman, in which a large army of Sudanese Mahdists armed in a traditional manner were destroyed by an Anglo-Egyptian force equipped with Maxim machine guns and artillery.

On some occasions, simple weapons employed in an unorthodox fashion have proven advantageous; Swiss pikemen gained many victories through their ability to transform a traditionally defensive weapon into an offensive one. Zulus in the early 19th century were victorious in battles against their rivals in part because they adopted a new kind of spear, the iklwa. Forces with inferior weapons have still emerged victorious at times, for example in the Wars of Scottish Independence. Disciplined troops are often of greater importance; at the Battle of Alesia, the Romans were greatly outnumbered but won because of superior training.

Battles can also be determined by terrain. Capturing high ground has been the main tactic in innumerable battles. An army that holds the high ground forces the enemy to climb and thus wear themselves down. Areas of jungle and forest, with dense vegetation act as force-multipliers, of benefit to inferior armies. Terrain may have lost importance in modern warfare, due to the advent of aircraft, though the terrain is still vital for camouflage, especially for guerrilla warfare.

Generals and commanders also play an important role. Hannibal, Julius Caesar, Khalid ibn Walid, Subutai and Napoleon Bonaparte were all skilled generals and their armies were extremely successful at times. An army that can trust the commands of their leaders with conviction in its success invariably has a higher morale than an army that doubts its every move and lacks hopefulness for future affairs. The British in the naval Battle of Trafalgar owed its success to the reputation of Admiral Lord Nelson.

== Types ==
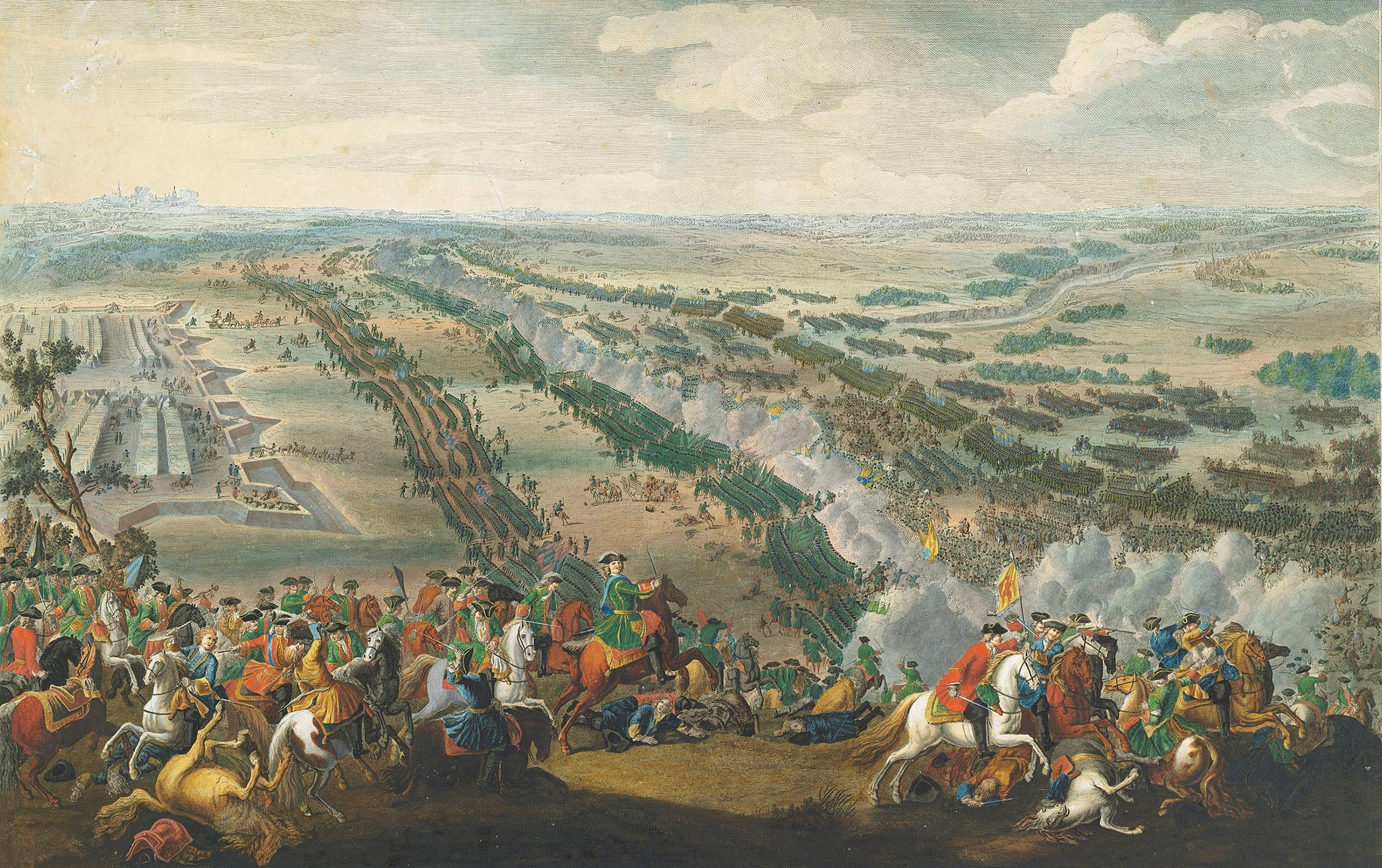
The Battle of Poltava between Russia and Sweden, by Denis Martens the Younger

Battles can be fought on land, at sea, and in the air. Naval battles have occurred since before the 5th century BC. Air battles have been far less common, due to their late conception, the most prominent being the Battle of Britain in 1940. Since the Second World War, land or sea battles have come to rely on air support. During the Battle of Midway, five aircraft carriers were sunk without either fleet coming into direct contact.

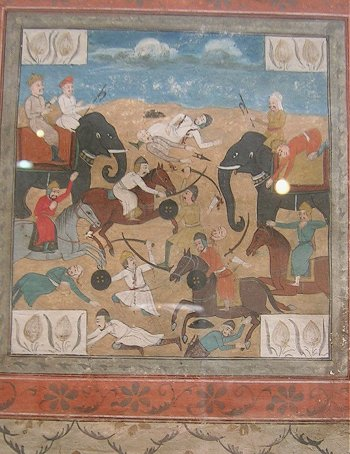
Battle Scene-Detail from Deccan miniature painting, c. 19th century

- A pitched battle is an encounter where opposing sides agree on the time and place of combat.
- A battle of encounter (or encounter battle) is a meeting engagement where the opposing sides collide in the field without either having prepared their attack or defence.
- A battle of attrition aims to inflict losses on an enemy that are less sustainable compared to one's own losses. These need not be greater numerical losses – if one side is much more numerous than the other then pursuing a strategy based on attrition can work even if casualties on both sides are about equal. Many battles of the Western Front in the First World War were intentionally (Verdun) or unintentionally (Somme) attrition battles.
- A battle of breakthrough aims to pierce the enemy's defences, thereby exposing the vulnerable flanks which can be turned.
- A battle of encirclement—the Kesselschlacht of the German battle of manoeuvre (bewegungskrieg)—surrounds the enemy in a pocket.
- A battle of envelopment involves an attack on one or both flanks; the classic example being the double envelopment of the Battle of Cannae.
- A battle of annihilation is one in which the defeated party is destroyed in the field, such as the French fleet at the Battle of the Nile.

Battles are usually hybrids of different types listed above.

A decisive battle is one with political effects, determining the course of the war such as the Battle of Smolensk or bringing hostilities to an end, such as the Battle of Hastings or the Battle of Hattin. A decisive battle can change the balance of power or boundaries between countries. The concept of the decisive battle became popular with the publication in 1851 of Edward Creasy's The Fifteen Decisive Battles of the World. British military historians J.F.C. Fuller (The Decisive Battles of the Western World) and B.H. Liddell Hart (Decisive Wars of History), among many others, have written books in the style of Creasy's work.

=== Land ===
There is an obvious difference in the way battles have been fought. Early battles were probably fought between rival hunting bands as unorganized crowds. During the Battle of Megiddo, the first reliably documented battle in the fifteenth century BC, both armies were organised and disciplined; during the many wars of the Roman Empire, barbarians continued to use mob tactics.

As the Age of Enlightenment dawned, armies began to fight in highly disciplined lines. Each would follow the orders from their officers and fight as a unit instead of individuals. Armies were divided into regiments, battalions, companies and platoons. These armies would march, line up and fire in divisions.

Native Americans, on the other hand, did not fight in lines, using guerrilla tactics. American colonists and European forces continued using disciplined lines into the American Civil War.

A new style arose from the 1850s to the First World War, known as trench warfare, which also led to tactical radio. Chemical warfare also began in 1915.

By the Second World War, the use of the smaller divisions, platoons and companies became much more important as precise operations became vital. Instead of the trench stalemate of 1915–1917, in the Second World War, battles developed where small groups encountered other platoons. As a result, elite squads became much more recognized and distinguishable. Maneuver warfare also returned with an astonishing pace with the advent of the tank, replacing the cannon of the Enlightenment Age. Artillery has since gradually replaced the use of frontal troops. Modern battles resemble those of the Second World War, along with indirect combat through the use of aircraft and missiles which has come to constitute a large portion of wars in place of battles, where battles are now mostly reserved for capturing cities.

=== Naval ===
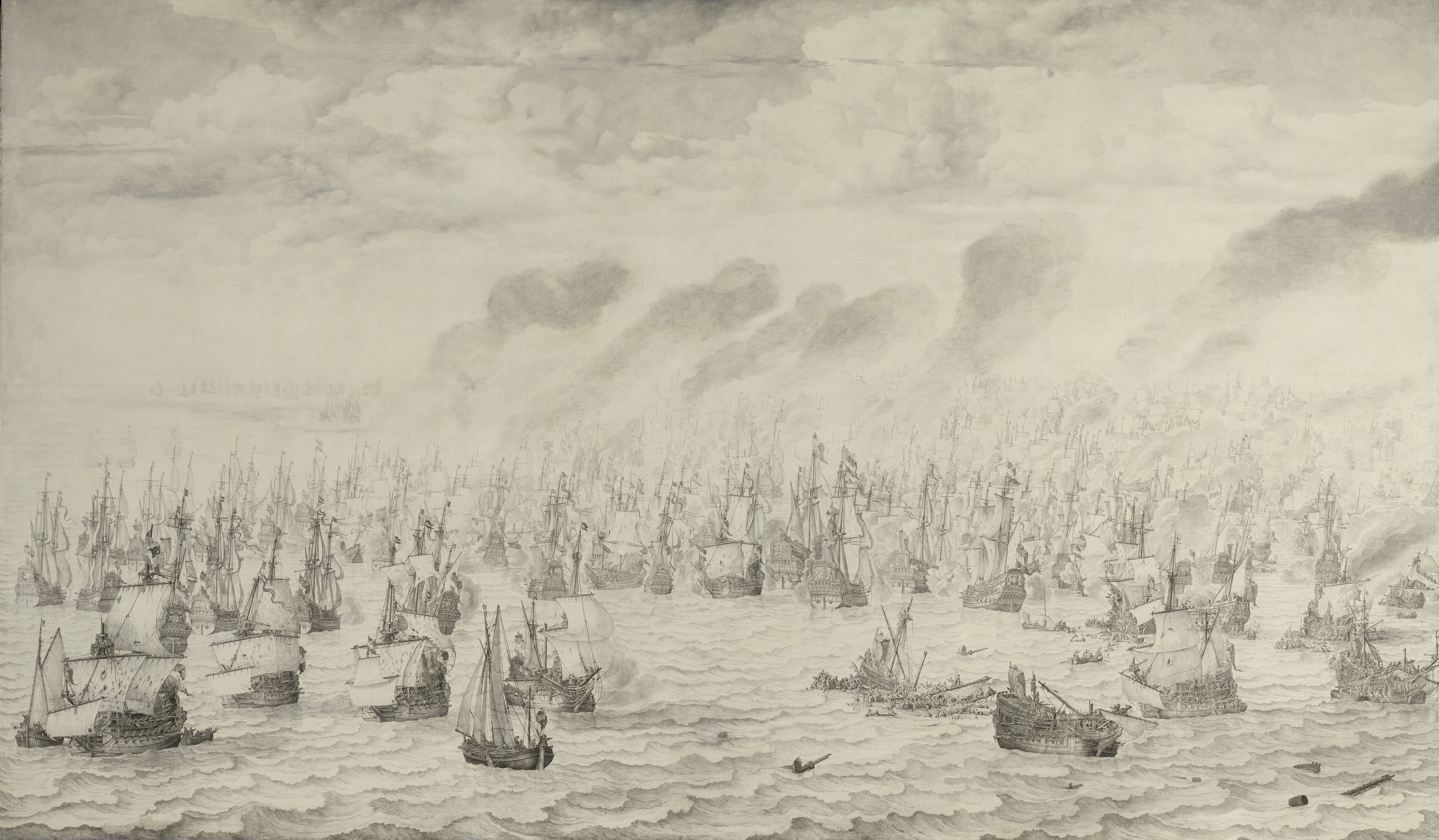
The Battle of Scheveningen of 1653: episode from the First Anglo-Dutch War.

One significant difference of modern naval battles, as opposed to earlier forms of combat is the use of marines, which introduced amphibious warfare. Today, a marine is actually an infantry regiment that sometimes fights solely on land and is no longer tied to the navy. A good example of an ancient naval battle is the Battle of Salamis. Most ancient naval battles were fought by fast ships using the battering ram to sink opposing fleets or steer close enough for boarding in hand-to-hand combat. Troops were often used to storm enemy ships as used by Romans and pirates. This tactic was usually used by civilizations that could not beat the enemy with ranged weaponry. Another invention in the late Middle Ages was the use of Greek fire by the Byzantines, which was used to set enemy fleets on fire. Empty demolition ships utilized the tactic to crash into opposing ships and set it afire with an explosion. After the invention of cannons, naval warfare became useful as support units for land warfare. During the 19th century, the development of mines led to a new type of naval warfare. The ironclad, first used in the American Civil War, resistant to cannons, soon made the wooden ship obsolete. The invention of military submarines, during World War I, brought naval warfare to both above and below the surface. With the development of military aircraft during World War II, battles were fought in the sky as well as below the ocean. Aircraft carriers have since become the central unit in naval warfare, acting as a mobile base for lethal aircraft.

=== Aerial ===
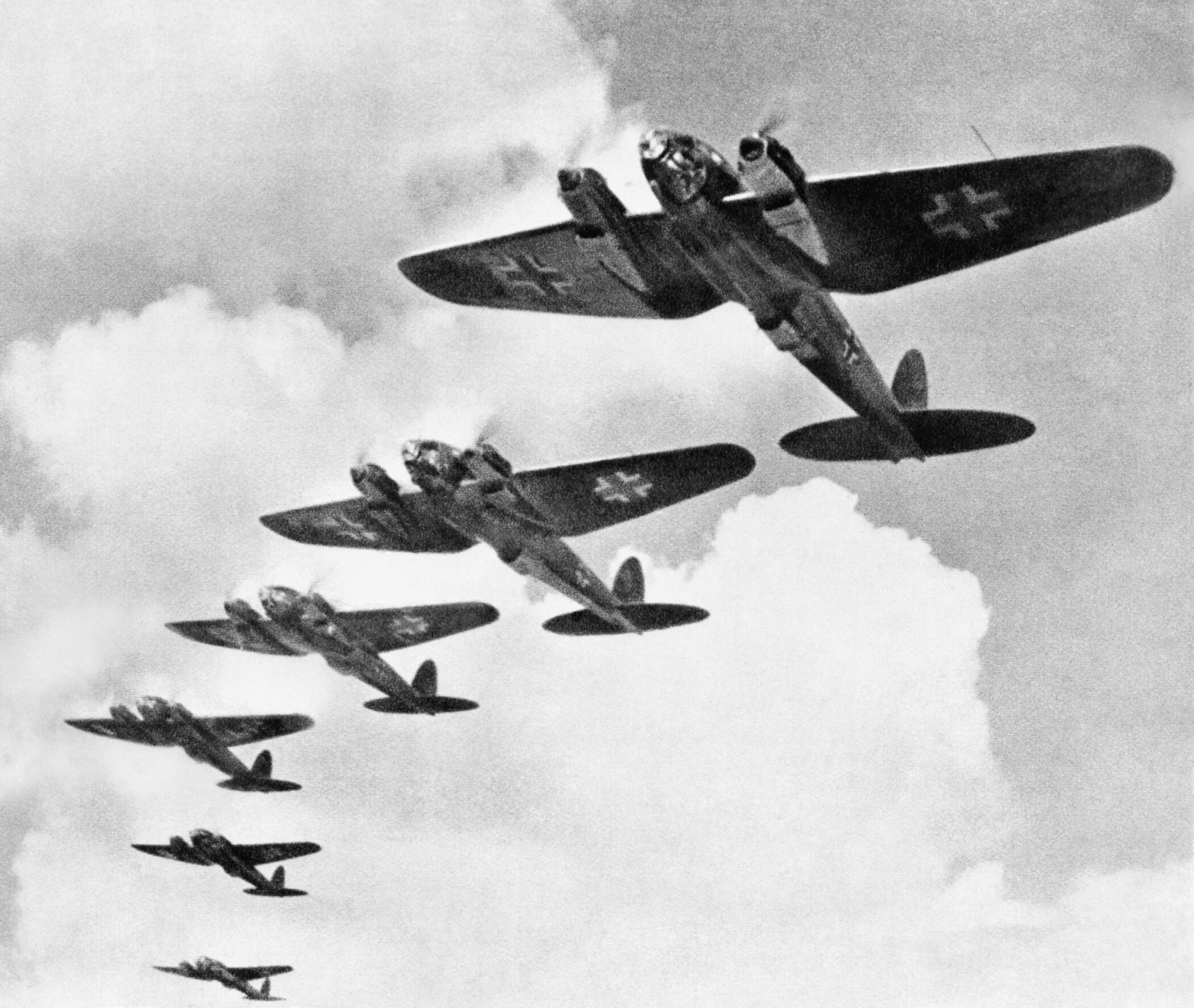
Heinkel He 111 bombers during the Battle of Britain

Although the use of aircraft has for the most part always been used as a supplement to land or naval engagements, since their first major military use in World War I aircraft have increasingly taken on larger roles in warfare. During World War I, the primary use was for reconnaissance, and small-scale bombardment. Aircraft began becoming much more prominent in the Spanish Civil War and especially World War II. Aircraft design began specializing, primarily into two types: bombers, which carried explosive payloads to bomb land targets or ships; and fighter-interceptors, which were used to either intercept incoming aircraft or to escort and protect bombers (engagements between fighter aircraft were known as dog fights). Some of the more notable aerial battles in this period include the Battle of Britain and the Battle of Midway. Another important use of aircraft came with the development of the helicopter, which first became heavily used during the Vietnam War, and still continues to be widely used today to transport and augment ground forces. Today, direct engagements between aircraft are rare – the most modern fighter-interceptors carry much more extensive bombing payloads, and are used to bomb precision land targets, rather than to fight other aircraft. Anti-aircraft batteries are used much more extensively to defend against incoming aircraft than interceptors. Despite this, aircraft today are much more extensively used as the primary tools for both army and navy, as evidenced by the prominent use of helicopters to transport and support troops, the use of aerial bombardment as the "first strike" in many engagements, and the replacement of the battleship with the aircraft carrier as the center of most modern navies.

== Naming ==
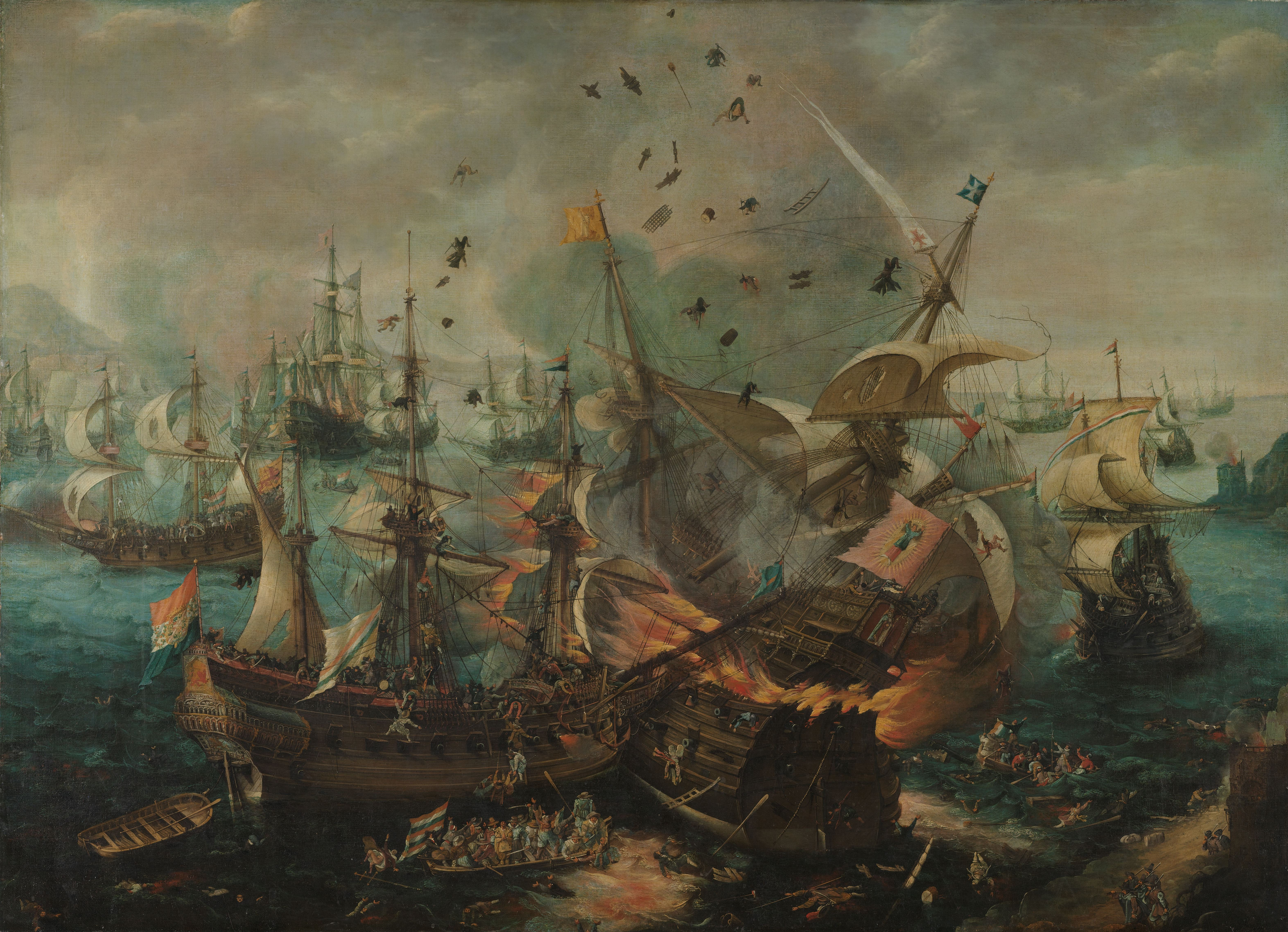
Battle of Gibraltar of 1607, Hendrick Cornelisz Vroom

Battles are usually named after some feature of the battlefield geography, such as a town, forest or river, commonly prefixed "Battle of...". Occasionally battles are named after the date on which they took place, such as The Glorious First of June. In the Middle Ages it was considered important to settle on a suitable name for a battle which could be used by the chroniclers. After Henry V of England defeated a French army on October 25, 1415, he met with the senior French herald and they agreed to name the battle after the nearby castle and so it was called the Battle of Agincourt. In other cases, the sides adopted different names for the same battle, such as the Battle of Gallipoli which is known in Turkey as the Battle of Çanakkale. During the American Civil War, the Union tended to name the battles after the nearest watercourse, such as the Battle of Wilsons Creek and the Battle of Stones River, whereas the Confederates favoured the nearby towns, as in the Battles of Chancellorsville and Murfreesboro. Occasionally both names for the same battle entered the popular culture, such as the First Battle of Bull Run and the Second Battle of Bull Run, which are also referred to as the First and Second Battles of Manassas.

Sometimes in desert warfare, there is no nearby town name to use; map coordinates gave the name to the Battle of 73 Easting in the First Gulf War. Some place names have become synonymous with battles, such as the Passchendaele, Pearl Harbor, the Alamo, Thermopylae and Waterloo. Military operations, many of which result in battle, are given codenames, which are not necessarily meaningful or indicative of the type or the location of the battle. Operation Market Garden and Operation Rolling Thunder are examples of battles known by their military codenames. When a battleground is the site of more than one battle in the same conflict, the instances are distinguished by ordinal number, such as the First and Second Battles of Bull Run. An extreme case are the twelve Battles of the Isonzo—First to Twelfth—between Italy and Austria-Hungary during the First World War.

Some battles are named for the convenience of military historians so that periods of combat can be neatly distinguished from one another. Following the First World War, the British Battles Nomenclature Committee was formed to decide on standard names for all battles and subsidiary actions. To the soldiers who did the fighting, the distinction was usually academic; a soldier fighting at Beaumont Hamel on November 13, 1916, was probably unaware he was taking part in what the committee named the Battle of the Ancre. Many combats are too small to be battles; terms such as "action", "affair", "skirmish", "firefight", "raid", or "offensive patrol" are used to describe small military encounters. These combats often take place within the time and space of a battle and while they may have an objective, they are not necessarily "decisive". Sometimes the soldiers are unable to immediately gauge the significance of the combat; in the aftermath of the Battle of Waterloo, some British officers were in doubt as to whether the day's events merited the title of "battle" or would be called an "action".

== Effects ==
Battles affect the individuals who take part, as well as the political actors. Personal effects of battle range from mild psychological issues to permanent and crippling injuries. Some battle-survivors have nightmares about the conditions they encountered or abnormal reactions to certain sights or sounds and some experience flashbacks. Physical effects of battle can include scars, amputations, lesions, loss of bodily functions, blindness, paralysis and death. Battles affect politics; a decisive battle can cause the losing side to surrender, while a Pyrrhic victory such as the Battle of Asculum can cause the winning side to reconsider its goals. Battles in civil wars have often decided the fate of monarchs or political factions. Famous examples include the Wars of the Roses, as well as the Jacobite risings. Battles affect the commitment of one side or the other to the continuance of a war, for example the Battle of Inchon and the Battle of Huế during the Tet Offensive.

== See also ==
- List of battles
- Military strategy
- Military tactics
- Naval battle
- Pitched battle
- Skirmisher
- War
