= Joseph B. Mitchell =

American historian

Joseph Brady Mitchell (September 25, 1915 – February 17, 1993) was an American military historian.

He served for 18 years in the U.S. Army and achieved the rank of lieutenant colonel.

== Books ==
- Decisive Battles of the American Revolution
- Decisive Battles of the Civil War
- Discipline and Bayonets: The Armies and Leaders in the War of the American Revolution
- Twenty Decisive Battles of the World
- Military Leaders of the Civil War
- The Badge of Gallantry: Recollections of Civil War Congressional Medal of Honor Winners
