= Strategic victory =

Winning a long-term advantage

A strategic victory is a victory that provides a long-term advantage to the victor and/or undermines the enemy's ability to wage war. When historians refer to a victory in general terms, they usually mean a strategic victory. A strategic victory often follows a tactical victory on the battlefield that enables further progress toward a campaign's objectives. However, a tactical defeat may also be considered a strategic victory if it achieves other goals, such as inflicting heavy casualties on the opposing force and slowing or halting its advance, potentially resulting in a Pyrrhic victory for the enemy.

== Examples ==
- Battle of Antietam, American Civil War: The battle itself was a tactical draw, as the Confederate Army of Northern Virginia under Robert E. Lee was forced to end its incursion into the North while the Union Army of the Potomac under George B. McClellan was unable to capitalize on its numerical advantage to destroy the Confederate army outright before the latter retreated back to Virginia. However, the battle provided an opportunity for President of the United States Abraham Lincoln to issue the Emancipation Proclamation, which prominently tied the issue of slavery to the war itself and made the prospect of British or French intervention in favor of the Confederacy much more remote as neither government could be seen as openly supporting a practice that both countries had themselves banned for years.
- First Battle of the Marne, World War I: The Allied victory managed to stop the German advance towards Paris at the city's eastern outskirts and ended prospects for a quick defeat of France in the Western Front, resulting in the frustration of the German Schlieffen Plan and leading to the two-front war the Plan had sought to avoid.
- Battle of Moscow, World War II: The successful Soviet defence of its capital.
- Battle of the Coral Sea, World War II: Though the Imperial Japanese Navy sank more Allied naval vessels in the battle than they lost, the planned Japanese invasion of Port Moresby in New Guinea and Tulagi in the southeastern Solomon Islands was checked and the unavailability of two fleet carriers (thanks to this battle) that could have otherwise been used by the IJN at the Battle of Midway a month later contributed to the US' decisive victory in the latter, marking the high point of the extent of the Japanese Empire after which Japan would gradually retreat.
- Tet Offensive, Vietnam War: Though the United States and South Vietnam recorded tactical victories as they were eventually able to repulse all of the Viet Cong's attacks during the offensive, the high-profile attacks greatly damaged the perception in the United States that the communists were being defeated since it was thought the VC were incapable of launching such an offensive. US public support for the war deteriorated and the US government began to draw down its involvement in the war as well as seek negotiations for a peace agreement.
- Operation Flash, Croatian War of Independence: Was a brief Croatian Army (HV) offensive conducted against the forces of the self-declared proto-state Republic of Serbian Krajina (RSK) from 1–3 May 1995. The offensive occurred in the later stages of the Croatian War of Independence and was the first major confrontation after ceasefire and economic cooperation agreements were signed between Croatia and the RSK in 1994. The last organised RSK resistance formally ceased on 3 May, with the majority of troops surrendering the next day near Pakrac, although mop-up operations continued for another two weeks.

== See also ==
- Decisive victory
- Tactical victory
- Pyrrhic victory
