= Tactical victory =

Accomplishment of a military operation's tactical objective

In military tactics, a tactical victory may refer to a victory that results in the completion of a tactical objective as part of an operation or a result in which the losses of the "defeated" outweigh those of the "victor" although the victorious force failed to meet its original objectives.

== Concepts ==
Large-scale planning of goals may be called "strategy" and are conducted at the "strategic level of war." Lower-level operations that fulfil the strategic planning are conducted at the "operational level of war." The lowest level of planning which fulfills operational goals and strategy is called the "tactical level of war".

== Based on planning ==
A tactical mission is one in which the operational area that aims to complete the goals of the assigned mission or task given by "tactical control." Therefore, a tactical victory is the successful completion of that mission. Tactical missions contribute to the success or failure of the whole operation. Tactics include the handling of assets such as soldiers, vehicles, weapons, and munitions and tactics might be as simple as the combat maneuvering of an individual soldier in a skirmish with an enemy soldier. The definition of tactical victory may become blurred in large-scale tactical maneuvering of troops in division-sized formations or the operational goals of company-sized units to exercise control of important positions, as they contribute in different ways to the success or the failure of operations and strategy.

Nations may have differing strategic objectives for a conflict, and their individual combat units may be made to believe in still-different objectives. Survival, on an individual or a unit level, may become an important objective in battle, and the different objectives allow both sides to maintain morale by declarations of victory to justify the costs of combat. Many battles involving multiple units include elements of tactical success by both opposing forces. The individual tactical victories may not cause the force to be successful in that battle or in the larger goals of the conflict.

== Based on losses ==
The term is then applied to a simple tally of the numbers of losses of each side, but that may be complicated by the value attached to certain assets lost. An example of a naval tactical victory dependent on losses would be the Battle of the Coral Sea. The battle was considered a strategic victory for the Allies because they stopped a Japanese invasion. However, the latter lost fewer valuable ships; the Allies lost one aircraft carrier, one destroyer, and one oil tanker, but the Japanese lost one light carrier and one destroyer and so are considered to have won a tactical victory.

== See also ==
- Decisive victory
- Strategic victory
- Pyrrhic victory
