= The Fifteen Decisive Battles of the World =

1851 book by Edward Shepherd Creasy

The Fifteen Decisive Battles of the World: from Marathon to Waterloo
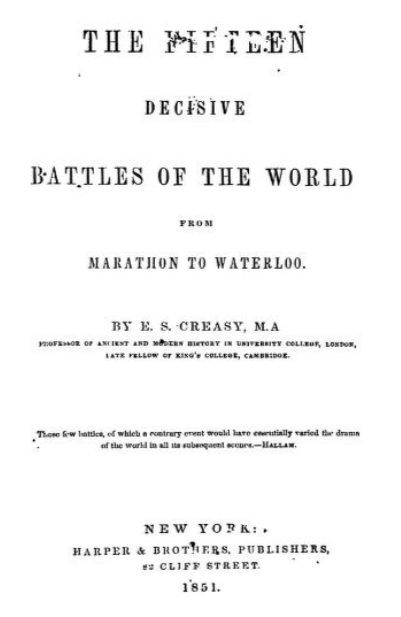
- Title page for The Fifteen Decisive Battles of the World: from Marathon to Waterloo (1851)
- Author: Edward Shepherd Creasy
- Language: English
- Subject: History
- Publication date: 1851
- Publication place: United Kingdom and India
- Media type: Paper

The Fifteen Decisive Battles of the World: from Marathon to Waterloo is a book written by Sir Edward Shepherd Creasy and published in 1851. This book tells the story of the fifteen military engagements which, according to the author, had a significant impact on world history.

== Chapters ==
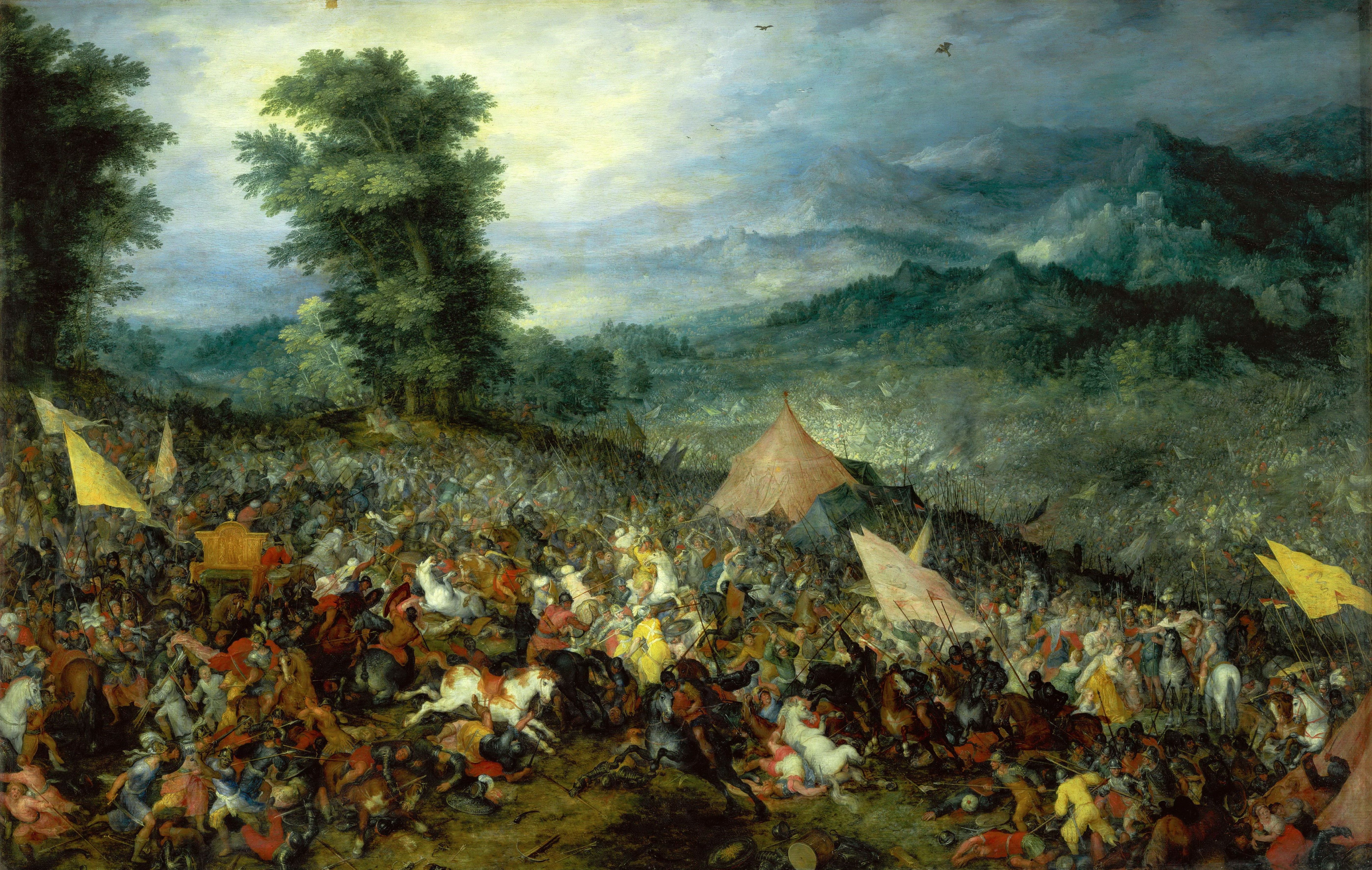
The Battle of Gaugamela

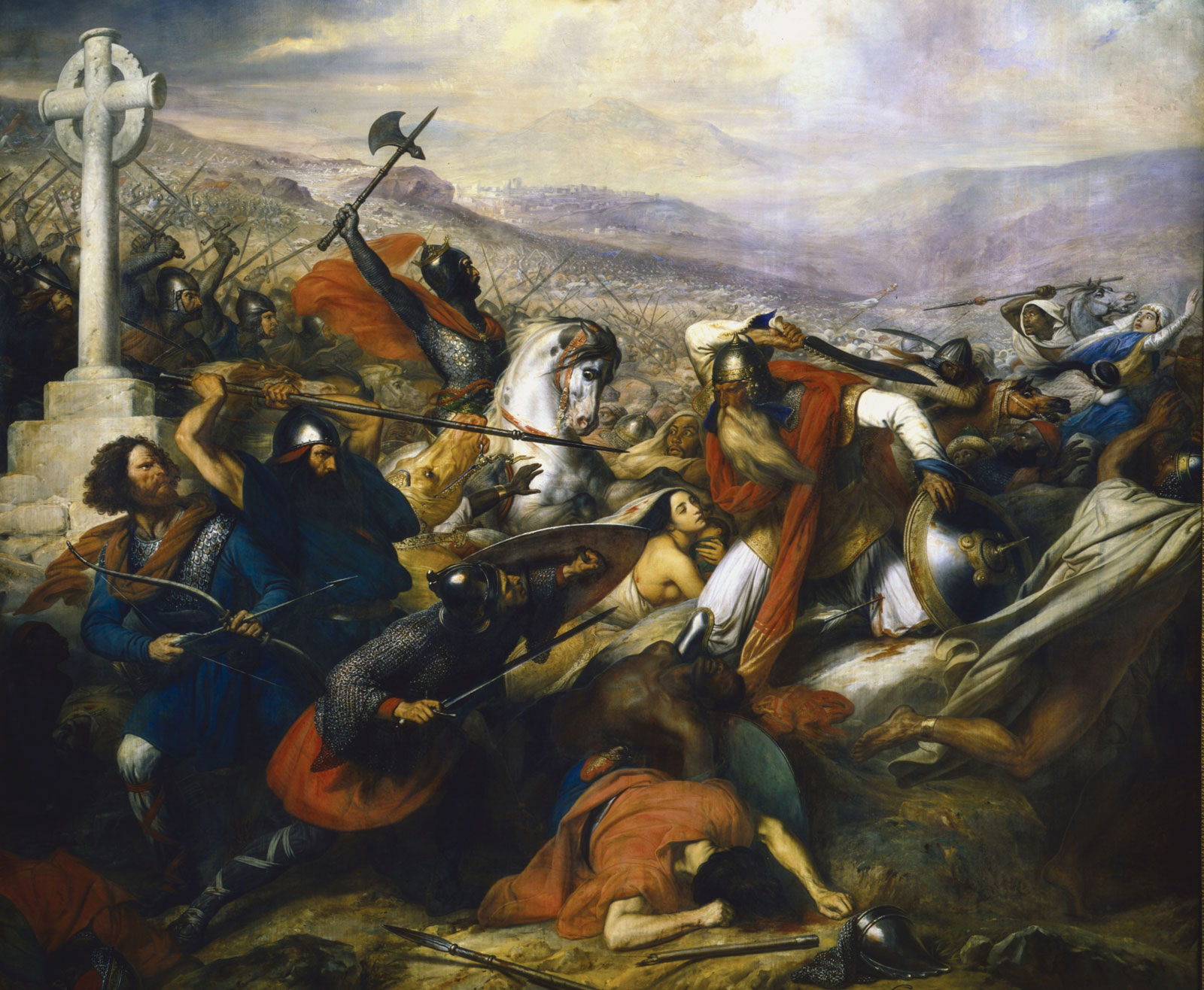
The Battle of Tours

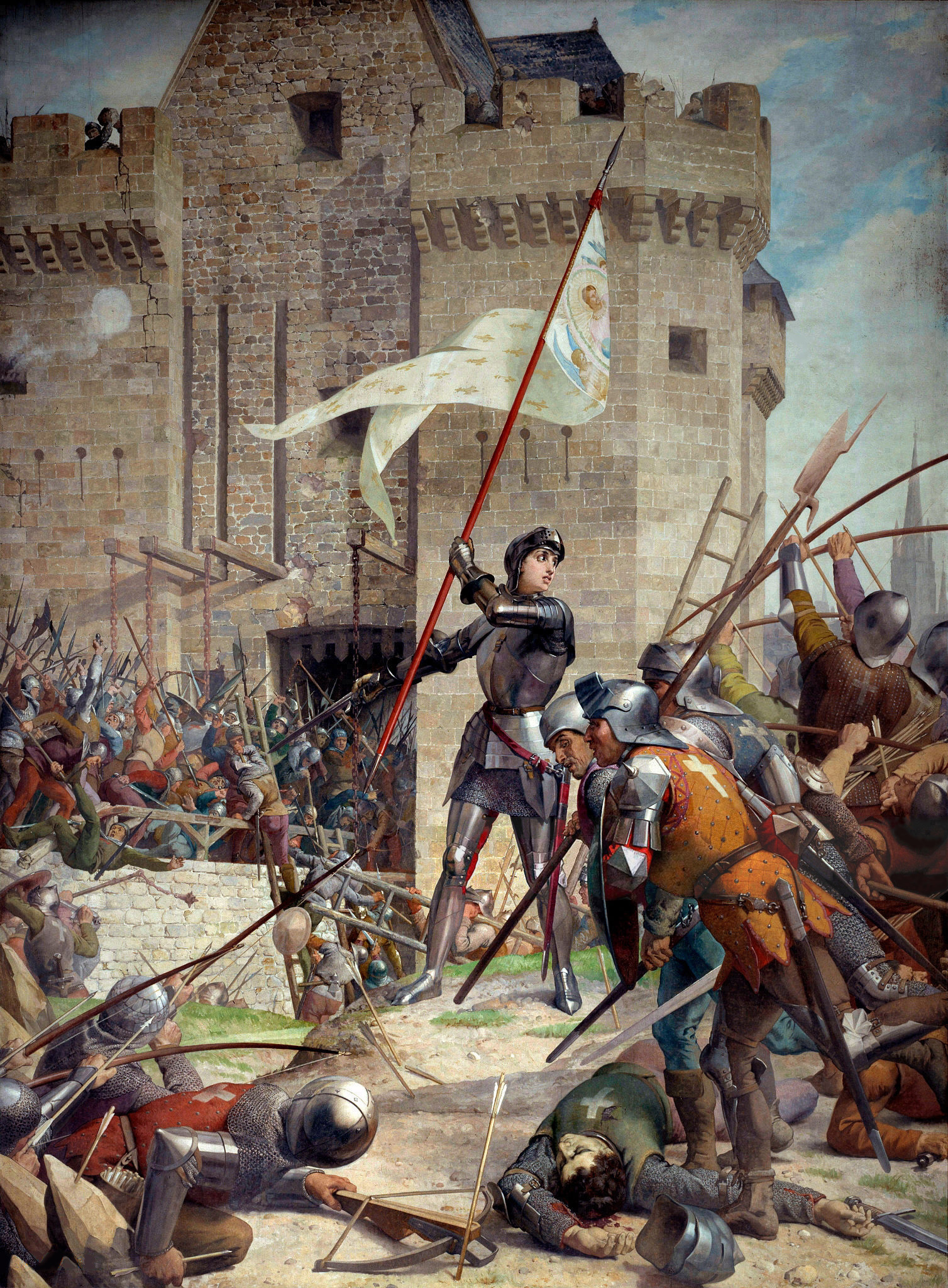
The Siege of Orléans

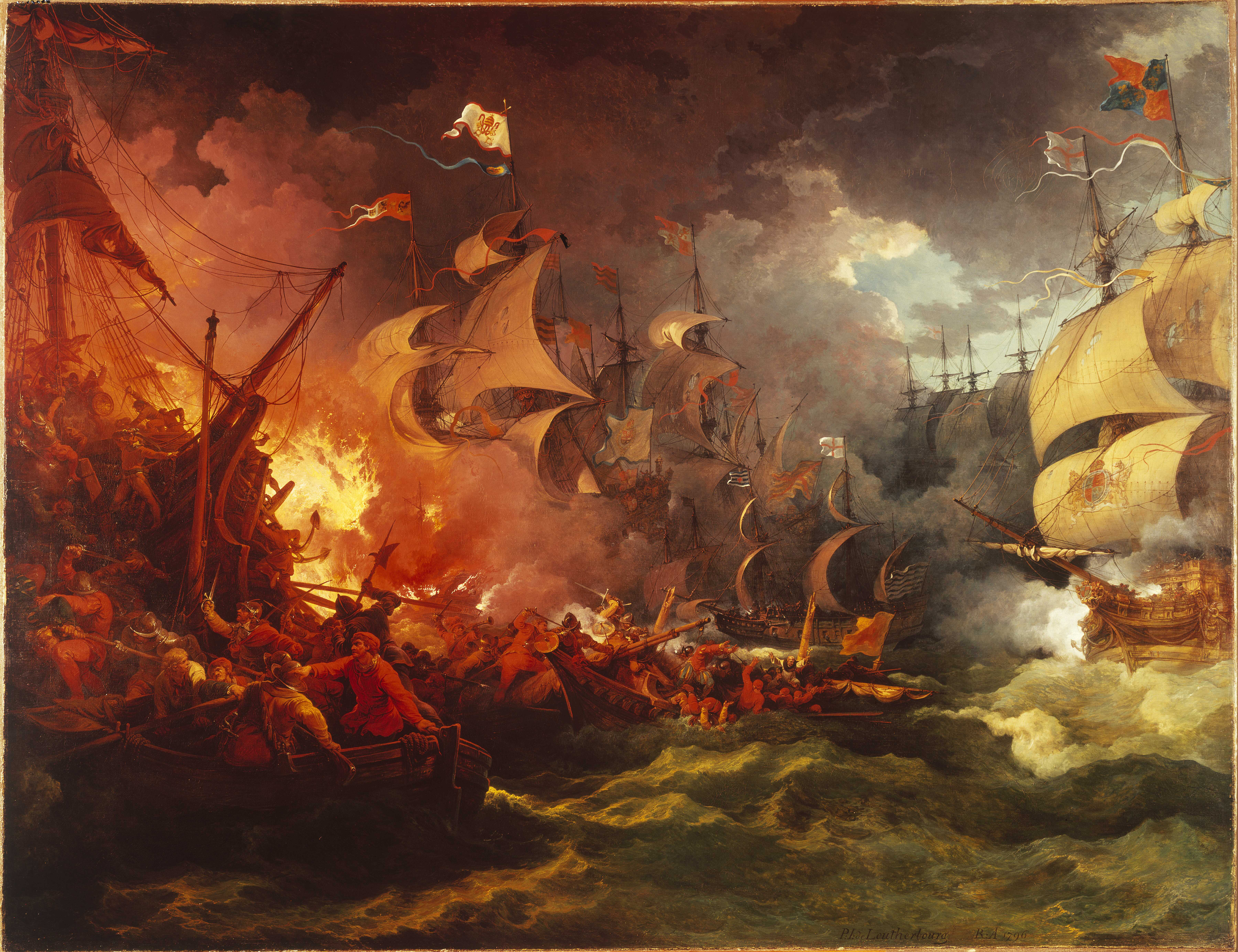
The Spanish Armada

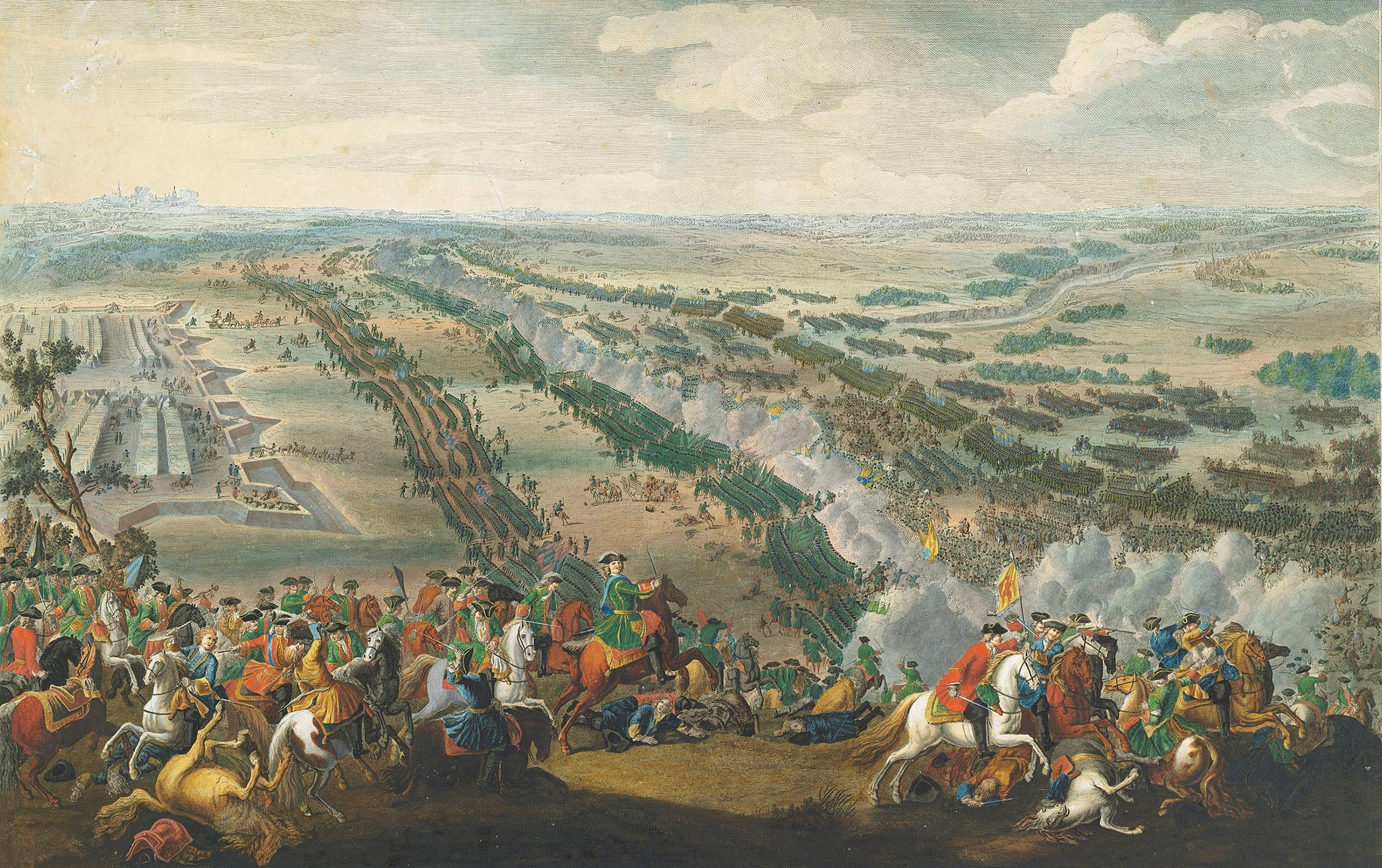
The Battle of Poltava

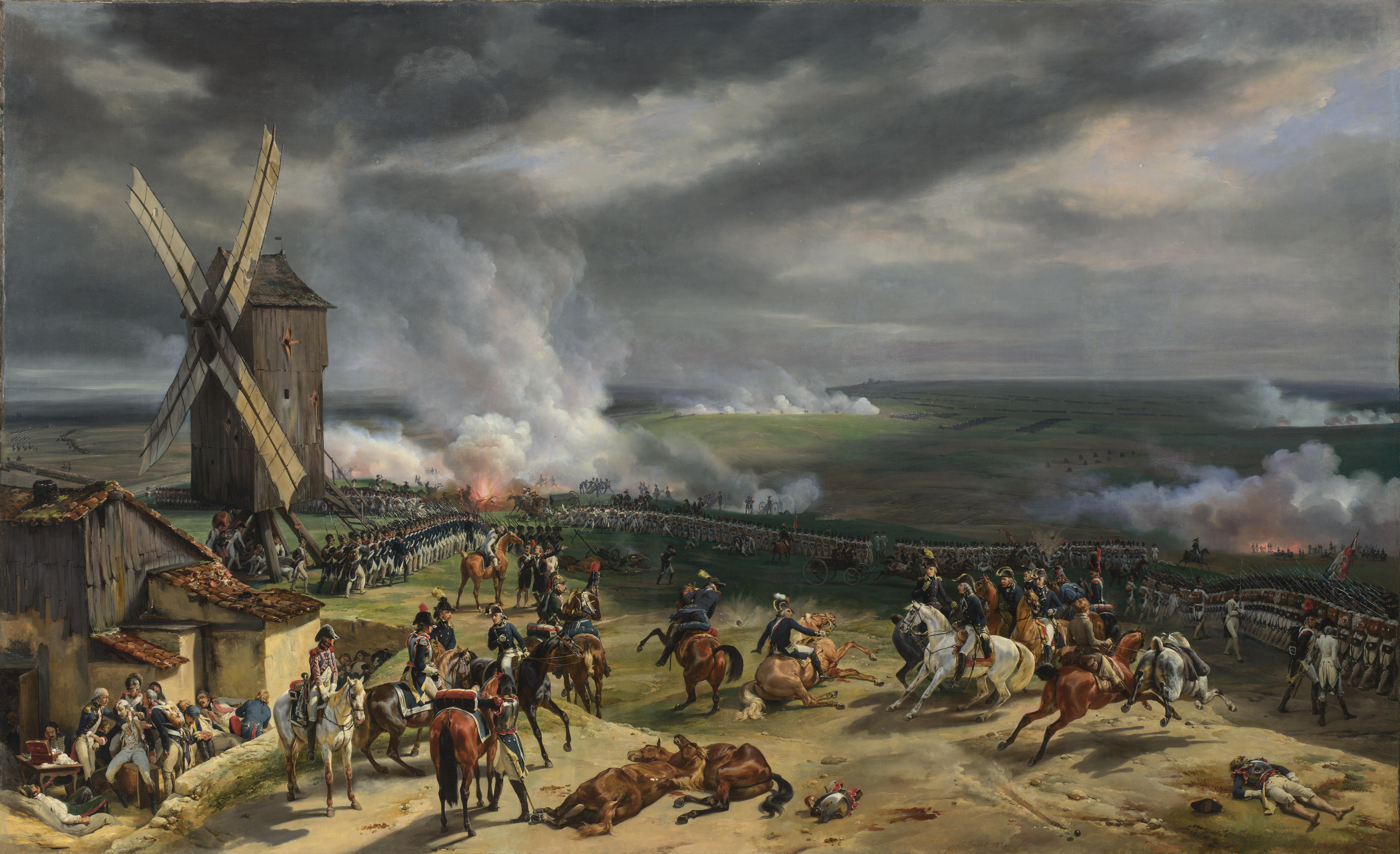
The Battle of Valmy

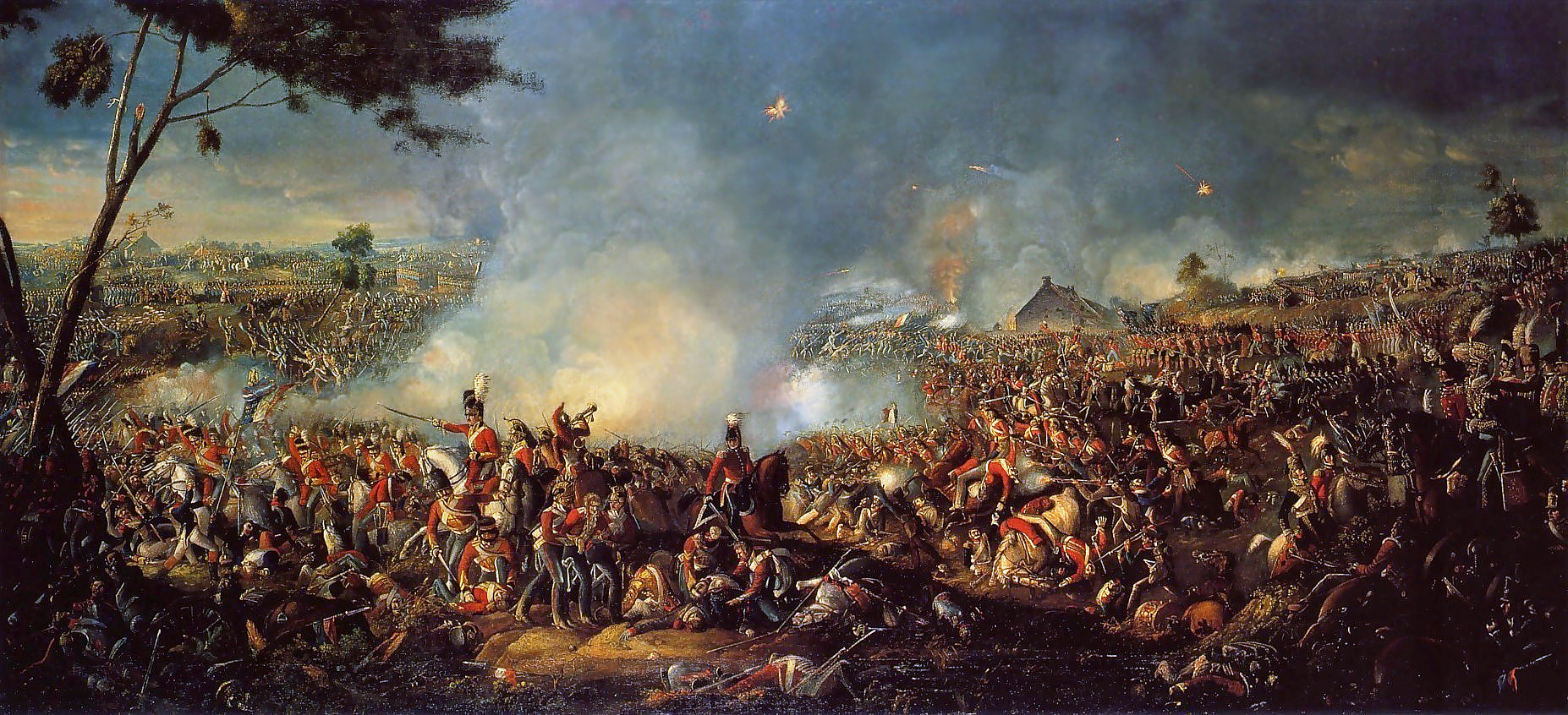
The Battle of Waterloo

Each chapter of the book describes a different battle. The fifteen chapters are:

1. The Battle of Marathon, 490 BC
  - Excerpt: "Two thousand three hundred and forty years ago, a council of Athenian Officers was summoned on the slope of one of the mountains that look over the plain of Marathon, on the eastern coast of Attica. The immediate subject of their meeting was to consider whether they should give battle to an enemy that lay encamped on the shore beneath them; but on the result of their deliberations depended, not merely the fate of two armies, but the whole future progress of human civilization."
2. Defeat of the Athenians at Syracuse, 413 BC
  - Known as the Battle of Syracuse.
  - Excerpt: "Few cities have undergone more memorable sieges during ancient and medieval times than has the city of Syracuse."
3. The Battle of Gaugamela, 331 BC
  - Also called the Battle of Arbela.
  - Excerpt: "the ancient Persian empire, which once subjugated all the nations of the earth, was defeated when Alexander had won his victory at Arbela."
4. The Battle of the Metaurus, 207 BC
  - Excerpt: "That battle was the determining crisis of the contest, not merely between Rome and Carthage, but between the two great families of the world..."
5. Victory of Arminius over the Roman Legions under Varus, AD 9
  - Known as the Battle of the Teutoburg Forest.
  - Excerpt: "that victory secured at once and forever the independence of the Teutonic race."
6. The Battle of Châlons, AD 451
  - Also called the Battle of the Catalaunian Fields or the Battle of the Catalun.
  - Excerpt: "The victory which the Roman general, Aëtius, with his Gothic allies, had then gained over the Huns, was the last victory of imperial Rome."
7. The Battle of Tours, AD 732
  - Also called the Battle of Poitiers.
  - Excerpt: "the great victory won by Charles Martel ... gave a decisive check to the career of Arab conquest in Western Europe."
8. The Battle of Hastings, AD 1066
  - Excerpt: "no one who appreciates the influence of England and her empire upon the destinies of the world will ever rank that victory as one of secondary importance."
9. Joan of Arc's Victory over the English at Orléans, AD 1429
  - Known as the Siege of Orléans.
  - Excerpt: "the struggle by which the unconscious heroine of France, in the beginning of the fifteenth century, rescued her country from becoming a second Ireland under the yoke of the triumphant English."
10. Defeat of the Spanish Armada, AD 1588
  - Excerpt: "The England of our own days is so strong, and the Spain of our own days is so feeble, that it is not easy, without some reflection and care, to comprehend the full extent of the peril which England then ran from the power and the ambition of Spain, or to appreciate the importance of that crisis in the history of the world."
11. The Battle of Blenheim, AD 1704
  - Excerpt: "Had it not been for Blenheim, all Europe might at this day suffer under the effect of French conquests resembling those of Alexander in extent and those of the Romans in durability."
12. The Battle of Pultowa, AD 1709
  - Also called the Battle of Poltava.
  - Excerpt: "The decisive triumph of Russia over Sweden at Pultowa was therefore all-important to the world, on account of what it overthrew as well as for what it established"
13. Victory of the Americans over Burgoyne at Saratoga, AD 1777
  - Excerpt: "The ancient Roman boasted, with reason, of the growth of Rome from humble beginnings to the greatest magnitude which the world had then ever witnessed. But the citizen of the United States is still more justly entitled to claim this praise."
14. The Battle of Valmy, AD 1792
  - Excerpt: "the kings of Europe, after the lapse of eighteen centuries, trembled once more before a conquering military republic."
15. The Battle of Waterloo, AD 1815
  - Excerpt: "The exertions which the allied powers made at this crisis to grapple promptly with the French emperor have truly been termed gigantic, and never were Napoleon's genius and activity more signally displayed than in the celerity and skill by which he brought forward all the military resources of France ..."

== Derivative works ==
Since the publication of Creasy's book, other historians have attempted to modify or add to the list.

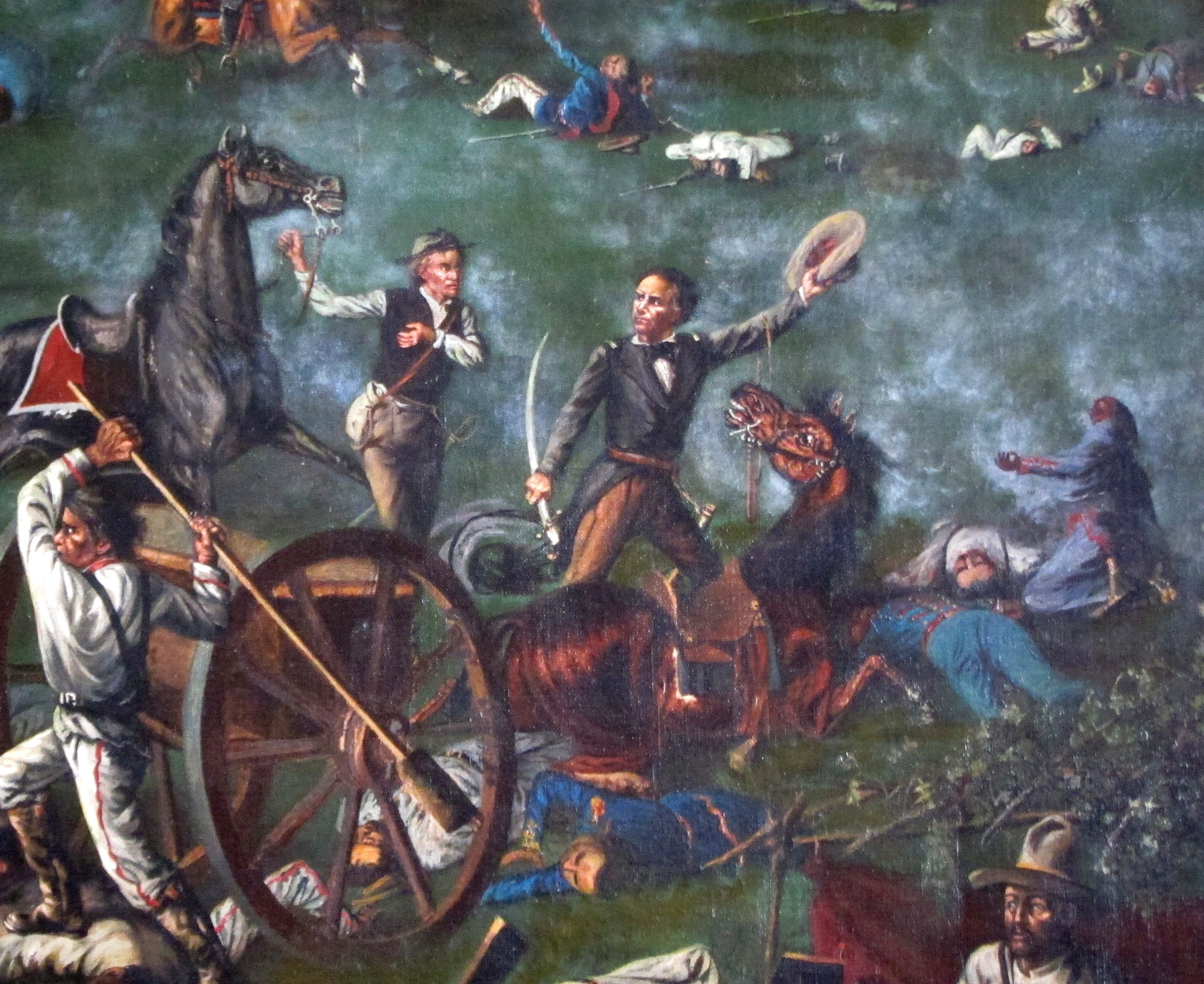
The Battle of San Jacinto

- In 1899 The Colonial Press published Decisive Battles of the World by Edward Shepherd Creasy with a Special Introduction and Supplementary Chapters On the Battles of Gettysburg 1863, Sedan 1870, Santiago and Manila 1898, by John Gilmer Speed (Revised Edition)
- In 1901 the firm J. B. Lippincott & Co. from Philadelphia published Great battles of the world by Stephen Crane, with illustrations by John Sloan.
- In 1908 Harper & Bros published an edition with eight battles added: Quebec, Yorktown, Vicksburg, Gettysburg, Sedan, Manila Bay, Santiago, and Tsushima.
- In 1920 Edgar Vincent, 1st Viscount D'Abernon published The Eighteenth Decisive Battle of the World: Warsaw, 1920, in which he claimed that the next battle on the list was the battle of Warsaw, fought in 1920 by the Polish and Bolshevik forces during the Polish–Soviet War.
- In 1930 Texas historian Clarence Wharton published San Jacinto: The Sixteenth Decisive Battle, in which he made the case for adding the final battle of the Texas Revolution to Creasy's list. In 1936 the San Jacinto Monument was given an inscription that echoed Wharton's view: "Measured by its results, San Jacinto was one of the decisive battles of the world. The freedom of Texas from Mexico won here led to annexation and to the Mexican–American War, resulting in the acquisition by the United States of the states of Texas, New Mexico, Arizona, Nevada, California, Utah and parts of Colorado, Wyoming, Kansas and Oklahoma. Almost one-third of the present area of the American Nation, nearly a million square miles of territory, changed sovereignty."
- In 1954–56, British historian J.F.C. Fuller published The Decisive Battles of the Western World and their Influence upon History.
- In 1956, historian and author Fletcher Pratt published The Battles that Changed History, stories of conflicts that forever changed the course of world events. He listed 16 battles from Arbela to Midway.
- In 1963, Robert Silverberg published 15 Battles that Changed the World and acknowledged the inspiration of Creasy's book. Silverberg's list included seven battles that Creasy had listed (Marathon, Tours, Hastings, Orleans, the Spanish Armada, Blenheim, and Waterloo) with six different battles (Zama, Actium, Adrianople, Lepanto, the Plains of Abraham, and Valcour Island) and two that had occurred after Creasy's work (Gettysburg and Stalingrad). Silverberg also acknowledged that this was a list of battles that had affected Western history and did not include battles from other parts of history.
- In 1964, American historian Lt. Col. Joseph B. Mitchell published Twenty Decisive Battles of the World, an update of Creasy's list with five additions:
  1. The Vicksburg Campaign, 1863. By capturing the Mississippi River during the American Civil War, the Union separated the Confederacy into halves.
  2. Battle of Sadowa, 1866. This Prussian victory over the Austrians during the Seven Weeks War paved the way for a German empire.
  3. First Battle of the Marne, 1914. The British and French prevented a German assault on Paris and an early German victory in World War I.
  4. Battle of Midway, 1942. The beginning of the United States offensive in the Pacific Ocean during World War II and the devastating loss of four Japanese aircraft carriers.
  5. Battle of Stalingrad, 1942–43. The defeat of the German attempt to conquer the Soviet Union and a significant loss of German resources in World War II.
- In 1976, Noble Frankland and Christopher Dowling published Decisive Battles of the Twentieth Century, which listed 23 battles, from the Battle of Tsushima to the Tet Offensive.
- In 100 Decisive Battles: From Ancient Times to the Present (2001), Paul K. Davis listed battles from Megiddo to Desert Storm.

== In popular culture ==
Referring to Creasy's work in the Gilbert and Sullivan operetta The Pirates of Penzance, Major-General Stanley boasts that he is able to "quote the fights historical; from Marathon to Waterloo, in order categorical."

== Criticism ==
Creasy's text, while immensely popular at the time, and still frequently read today came into an increasing amount of criticism from the 20th century onwards in regards to several aspects.

=== Eurocentrism ===
The vast majority of Creasy's selected battles occurred in Europe between two European powers (or in the case of the Battle of Saratoga, between two Western powers). In addition, many of his battles feature England in some capacity, leaving a lack of balance in regards to non-European history.

=== Non-decisive ===
Creasy's text is premised on the fact that his chosen battles were decisive - that an alternate result (or the absence of the battle) would lead to the world as we know it being radically different. This viewpoint has been frequently criticised in the last century, with most, though not all, viewpoints disagreeing that (these) singular battles were the primary movers of society.

=== Vagueness ===
Beyond potential errors in choice or concept, Creasy is criticised for the vagueness of his descriptions, sources given and battle analysis. By World War I, fully reconstructed battle movements and plans were considered the norm if true analysis was to be undertaken. The lack of context, both political and social, around the battles chosen makes consideration of its various impacts either difficult or impossible. There is also a focus on dramatic description or rhetoric of the battles taking precedence over analysis. Set against this however is the fact that Creasy did not specifically set out to target his works for the military or military historians - he also wrote for public readership, and was without military experience or formal training in the field.
