= Edward Shepherd Creasy =

Chief Justice of British Ceylon from 1860 to 1875

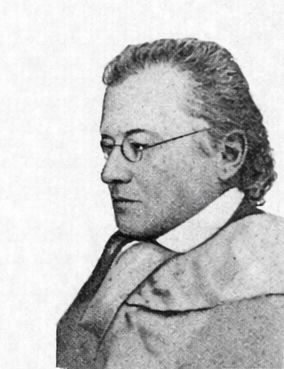
Edward Creasy portrait

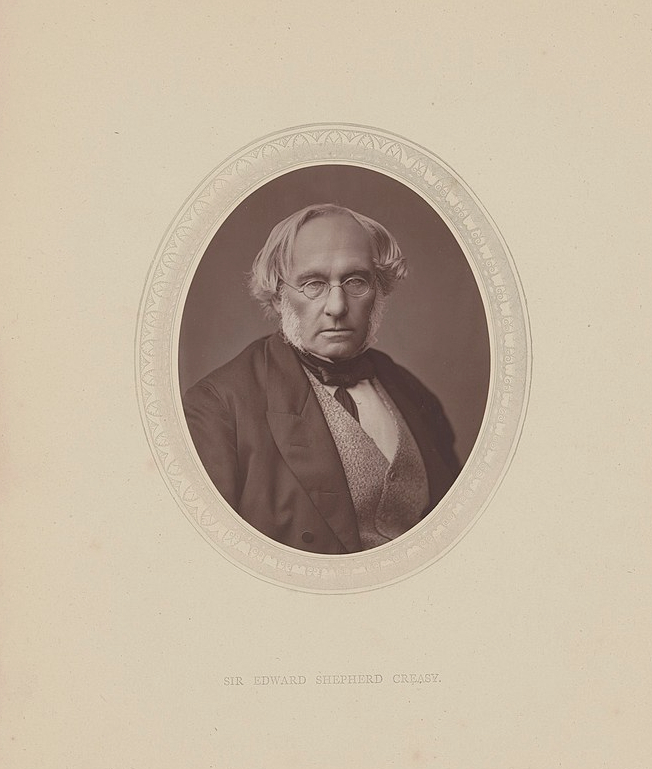
Sir Edward Shepherd Creasy, 1870s woodburytype

Sir Edward Shepherd Creasy (12 September 1812 – 17 January 1878) was an English historian and jurist.

== Life ==
The son of a land agent, he was born in Bexley, Kent, England, and educated at Eton College (where he won the Newcastle Scholarship in 1831) and King's College, Cambridge. He was called to the Bar in 1837 and appointed assistant judge at the Westminster sessions court.

In 1840, he began teaching history at the University of London and wrote a number of historical books including The Fifteen Decisive Battles of the World (1851).

Creasy was knighted in 1860 and spent the next decade and a half in Ceylon as Chief Justice of Ceylon (1860 to 1875). He then returned in poor health to England and died in London on 17 January 1878.

While in Ceylon, he served as president of the Ceylon Branch of the Royal Asiatic Society from 1861 to 1864. In July, 1864 Creasy founded the Colombo Rowing Club.

== Works ==
Creasy's best known contribution to literature is his Fifteen Decisive Battles of the World (1851). Historian John Keegan characterized it in The Face of Battle as "one of the great Victorian best-sellers, rivalling Darwin's Origin of Species . . . republished thirty-eight times in the forty-three years between 1851 and 1894." The reason that Creasy gives for the significance of many of the fifteen battles is that they denied Eastern peoples access to European soil. Other battles are seen as "decisive" because they shaped the development of Britain, which was the world's leading power at the time of writing.

Other works are:

- Biographies of Eminent Etonians (1850) (several editions)
- Historical and Critical Account of the Several Invasions of England (1852);
- History of the Ottoman Turks, from the Beginning of Their Empire to the Present Time (1854)
- The Rise and Progress of the English Constitution (1855) (17th ed. 1886)
- History of England from the Earliest to the Present Time (5 vols.), 1869–70
- Imperial and Colonial Constitutions of the Britannic Empire, Including Indian Institutions (1872)
- First Platform of International Law (London: John van Voorst, Paternoster Row, 1876).

Old Love and the New (1870) was a novel. With John Sheehan and Robert Gordon Latham, Creasy took part in contributing to Bentley's Miscellany, the political squibs in verse known as the Tipperary Papers.
