= Barbalha =

Municipality in Ceará, Brazil

Barbalha Município de Barbalha
- Municipality
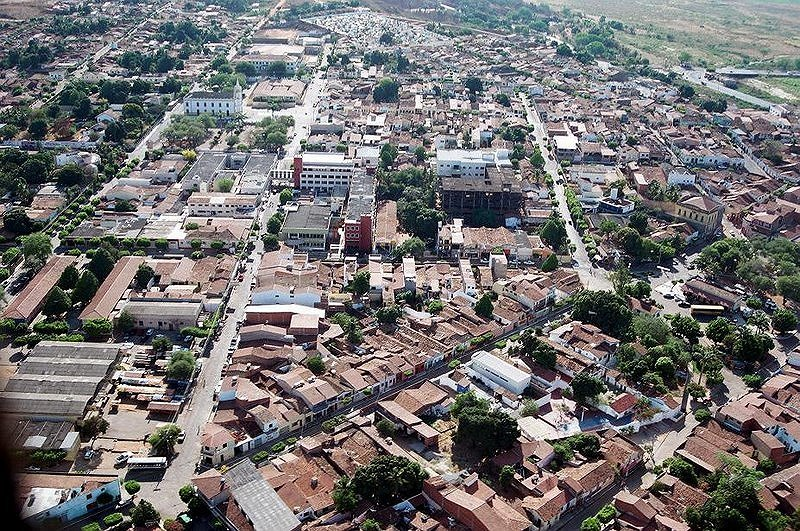
- Aerial view of Barbalha

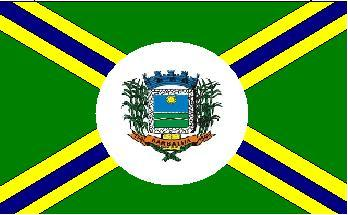
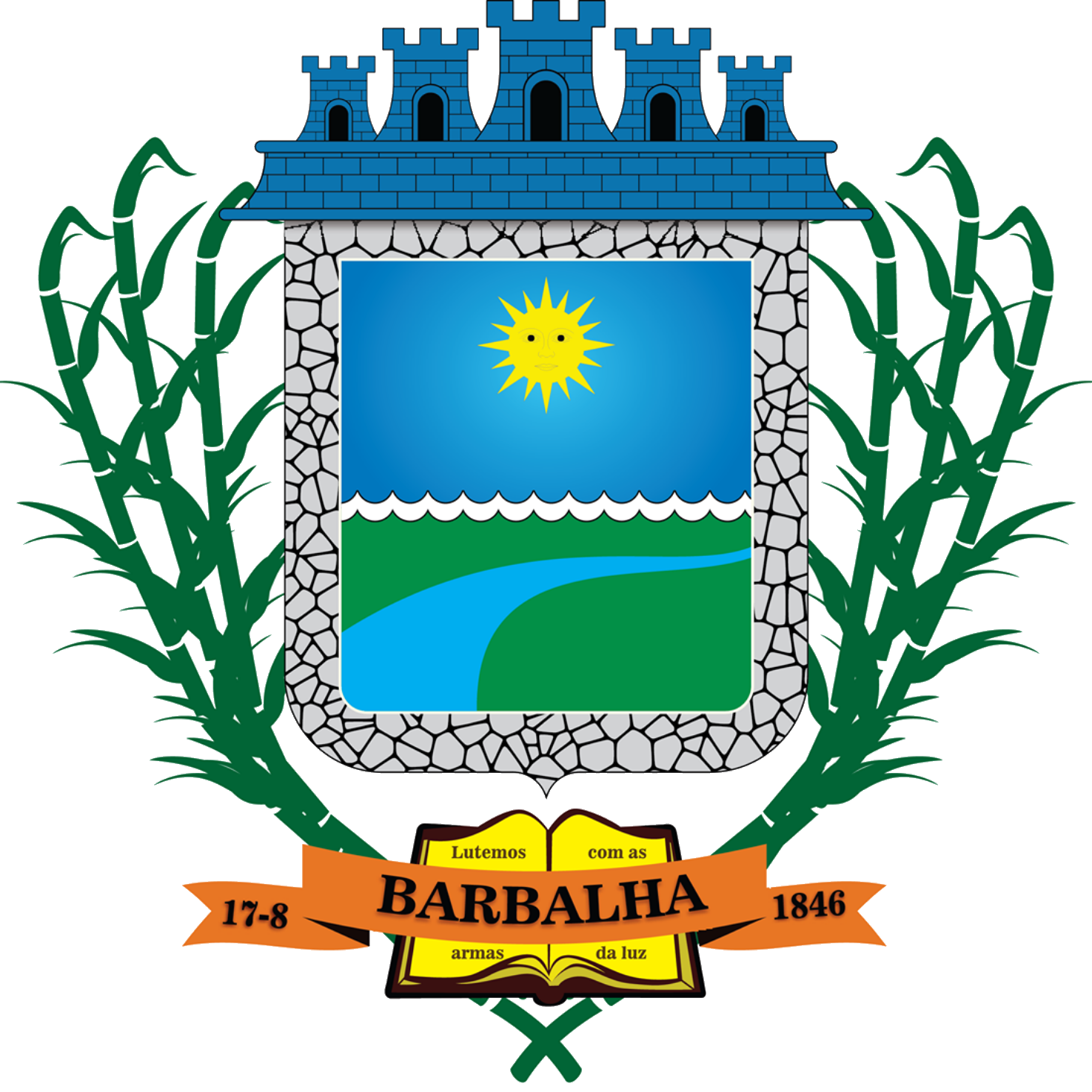
- Flag Coat of arms
- Motto: Lutemos com as armas da luz
- Location of Barbalha in Ceará

- Location of Barbalha in Brazil
- Coordinates: 7°18′18″S 39°18′7″W
- Country: Brazil
- Region: Northeast
- State: Ceará
- Founded: 1846

Government
  - Mayor: Argemiro Sampaio Neto (PSDB, 2017–2020)

Area
  - Total: 569.5 km^{2} (219.9 sq mi)
- Elevation: 414 m (1,358 ft)

Population (2020)
  - Total: 61,228
  - Density: 107.5/km^{2} (278.5/sq mi)
- Demonym: Barbalhense
- Time zone: UTC−3 (BRT)
- Website: barbalha.ce.gov.br

Barbalha is a municipality in the state of Ceará in the Northeast region of Brazil. Barbalha covers 569.5 km^{2} (219.9 mi^{2}), and has a population of 61,228 with a population density of 100 inhabitants per square kilometer. It is located at the south of the state, 575 km (357 mi) from the state capital of Fortaleza. The eastern part of the Araripe-Apodi National Forest, established in 1946, is located in Barbalha. The city sits at the foot of the Chapada do Araripe, a large plateau on the border of Ceará and Pernambuco.

The municipality of Barbalha is located in the microregion of the Vale do Cariri, in the south of the state of Ceará. It is bordered by the municipalities of Crato, Juazeiro do Norte, Porteiras, Jardim, and Missão Velha.

In the Portuguese colonial period the larger region of southern Ceará belonged to Francisco Magalhães Barreto (1816–1887), a sugarcane landowner. The small settlement of Barbalha was elevated to parish (freguesia) status by Provincial Law No. 91 of August 30, 1838. On August 7, 1846, by Provincial Law no. 374, it was raised to village status and a judiciary seat was created there. Barbalha was then detached from the municipality of Crato. Barbalha was elevated to municipality status by Provincial Law no. 9740 on August 30, 1876.

Barbalha is associated with significant events of history in Ceará in the 19th century. Residents of the town participated in the Pernambucan Revolt of 1817 and in the Confederation of the Equator, a short-lived rebellion that occurred in the Northeastern region of Brazil in 1824.

An important festival in Barbalha is the Festa do Pau-da-Bandeira de Santo Antonio (Feast of the Flagpole of Saint Anthony) in June. The municipality produces famous rapadura (panela) (unrefined whole cane sugar) and cassava flour. Other industries in the town produce marble, bricks, tiles, and Portland cement.

== Former Town Hall ==
The former town hall of Barbalha (Casa de Câmara e Cadeia) was built during the great drought of 1877. Construction of the building was approved to create work for unemployed farmers. The square at the town hall is the location of Festa do Pau-da-Bandeira de Santo Antonio. The building, according to town residents, was renovated at the beginning of the 1930s. The town hall became a protected structure of the State of Ceará on March 3, 1995.

== Climate ==
Barbalha experiences a tropical savanna climate (Köppen: Aw) with hot temperatures and distinct wet and dry seasons.

The city experiences a wet season from January to April. The dry season extends from June to November.

Barbalha has hot conditions throughout the year. October and November are the hottest months, with average highs around 33 °C (91 °F).

Climate data for Barbalha (1991–2020)
Month	Jan	Feb	Mar	Apr	May	Jun	Jul	Aug	Sep	Oct	Nov	Dec	Year
Mean daily maximum °C (°F)	32.7 (90.9)	31.6 (88.9)	31.3 (88.3)	31.3 (88.3)	31.3 (88.3)	30.9 (87.6)	31.1 (88.0)	32.7 (90.9)	34.4 (93.9)	35.3 (95.5)	35.1 (95.2)	34.4 (93.9)	32.7 (90.9)
Daily mean °C (°F)	26.2 (79.2)	25.6 (78.1)	25.4 (77.7)	25.2 (77.4)	25.0 (77.0)	24.7 (76.5)	24.6 (76.3)	25.5 (77.9)	26.8 (80.2)	27.8 (82.0)	27.8 (82.0)	27.3 (81.1)	26.0 (78.8)
Mean daily minimum °C (°F)	21.8 (71.2)	21.6 (70.9)	21.5 (70.7)	21.2 (70.2)	20.7 (69.3)	19.9 (67.8)	19.6 (67.3)	19.5 (67.1)	20.3 (68.5)	21.6 (70.9)	22.2 (72.0)	22.2 (72.0)	21.0 (69.8)
Average precipitation mm (inches)	180.9 (7.12)	197.4 (7.77)	251.7 (9.91)	151.0 (5.94)	69.8 (2.75)	18.2 (0.72)	13.9 (0.55)	2.4 (0.09)	4.2 (0.17)	20.2 (0.80)	36.3 (1.43)	76.3 (3.00)	1,022.3 (40.25)
Average precipitation days (≥ 1.0 mm)	10.1	11.8	13.8	9.6	5.4	1.9	1.6	0.6	0.7	1.7	3.6	5.1	65.9
Average relative humidity (%)	72.5	80.0	81.8	81.1	76.2	70.2	63.8	57.8	54.0	53.3	59.3	63.1	67.8
Average dew point °C (°F)	21.1 (70.0)	21.9 (71.4)	22.3 (72.1)	22.1 (71.8)	21.1 (70.0)	19.3 (66.7)	18.0 (64.4)	17.4 (63.3)	17.5 (63.5)	18.3 (64.9)	19.6 (67.3)	20.0 (68.0)	19.9 (67.8)
Mean monthly sunshine hours	214.7	193.3	214.0	227.4	230.8	235.4	248.9	284.3	285.1	290.5	261.3	252.6	2,938.3
Source: NOAA

== Notable people ==
- Hermes Carleial (1904–1954), Brazilian poet, lawyer, accountant and writer

== See also ==
- List of municipalities in Ceará
