= Tito Aureliano =

Brazilian palaeontologist and science communicator

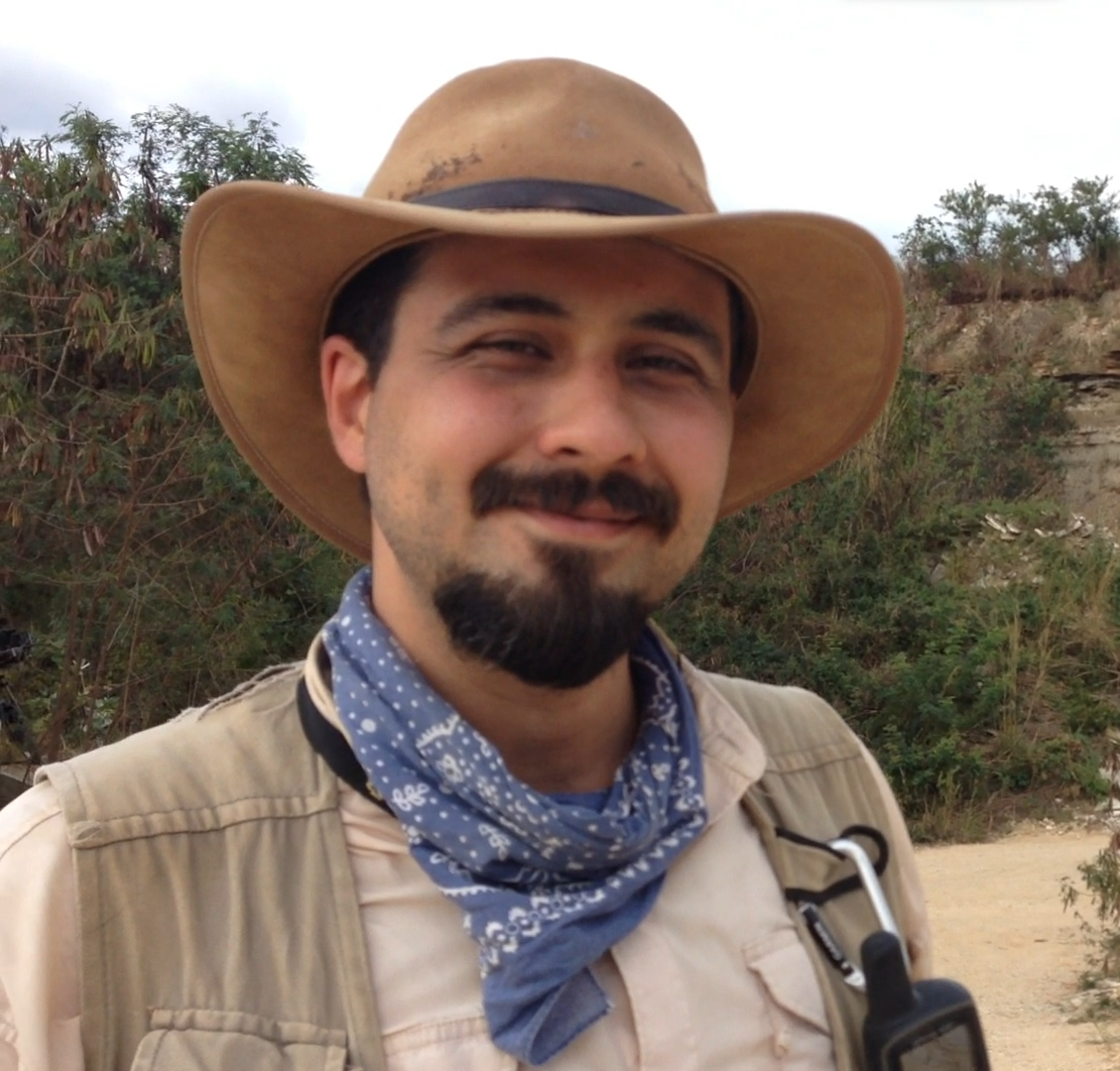
- Aureliano in 2023
- Born: 28 December 1989 (age 36); Brazil
- Education: State University of Campinas; Federal University of Pernambuco
- Known for: "Colecionadores de Ossos (Bone Collectors)", paleontology, paleohistology, anatomy
- Spouse: Aline Ghilardi
- Scientific career
- Fields: Paleontologist, researcher, geologist, science communicator
- Workplaces: Universidade Regional do Cariri

Tito Aureliano Neto, or simply Tito Aureliano (Recife, December 28, 1989), is a Brazilian paleontologist, researcher, science communicator, and writer.

== Biography ==
Although born in Recife, Tito moved to Brasília as a child, with his parents and sister. During his childhood, he became interested in paleontology. He studied and worked at the University of Brasília, until he completed his degree in Geology at the Federal University of Pernambuco. He later earned a master's and doctorate in science from the State University of Campinas (Unicamp). He specializes in the study of fossilized tissues and his doctoral research was a study of the evolution of the dinosaur respiratory system through paleohistology.

== Science communication and Colecionadores de Ossos ==
In January 2010, he joined the blog created by scientist Aline Ghilardi Colecionadores de Ossos (Bone Collectors), focused on science outreach about paleontology. The blog became a YouTube channel in 2014 and has established itself as one of the main productions of its subject in Brazil. The YouTube channel evolved into the world's largest Paleontology and Geosciences channel carried out independently by experts in the area, offering direct dialogue between audience and active researchers. The initiative produces literary, audiovisual, and gaming material with more than 200 works distributed in over 40 countries.

In 2015, Tito released the book Dino Hazard: Hidden Reality, a fictional story that also got Spanish and English versions and a prequel as a role-playing video game.

== Research contributions ==
=== Paleohistology ===
Through systematic paleohistological investigations utilizing advanced thin-sectioning techniques, Aureliano has made contributions to understanding bone microstructure, growth dynamics, and physiological adaptations across diverse extinct vertebrate groups. His research encompasses studies on dinosaurs, pterosaurs, crocodyliforms, and Quaternary mammals, providing insights into their paleobiology and evolutionary strategies.

Aureliano's histological investigations have provided crucial insights into the evolution of dwarfism and unique growth strategies within titanosaur lineages. His collaboration on the analysis of Ibirania parva, a nanoid titanosaur from the Upper Cretaceous São José do Rio Preto Formation, revealed that extreme secondary remodeling and dense Haversian bone tissue can result from environmental pressures beyond traditional island dwarfism. The histological analysis demonstrated that this 5.7-meter-long sauropod had achieved full skeletal maturity, exhibiting Histological Ontogenetic Stage 13-14 with up to five generations of secondary osteons and senescent tissue characteristics, confirming its adult status despite diminutive size.

His comparative work revealed that Ibirania exhibits bone tissue patterns remarkably similar to European insular nanoid titanosaurs like Magyarosaurus and Lirainosaurus, including reduced medullary cavities, thick cortical bone, and extensive secondary remodeling caused by slowed resorption fronts. This research demonstrated that environmental stresses such as prolonged aridity and resource limitations can drive convergent evolution of similar histological adaptations in geographically distant titanosaur lineages, challenging previous assumptions that dwarfism was exclusively associated with island environments.

Aureliano's earlier work on Lower Cretaceous titanosaur remains from the Rio Piranhas Formation further contributed to understanding ontogenetic variation within the group. His histological analysis of a juvenile titanosaur fibula revealed fibrolamellar bone tissue with variable vascularization patterns and limited secondary remodeling, representing approximately 40-50% of adult body size at Histological Ontogenetic Stage 7. This study emphasized the importance of histological analysis in distinguishing between juvenile individuals and genuinely small-bodied adults, providing methodological frameworks for future studies of sauropod body size evolution. The research also demonstrated significant microstructural variation across different regions of the same bone, highlighting the necessity of comprehensive sampling strategies in paleohistological investigations.

His work on theropod dinosaurs has significantly advanced understanding of growth evolution within Abelisauroidea. Analysis of an abelisaurid femur from the Serra da Galga Formation challenged previous hypotheses linking environmental pressures to reduced growth rates, instead suggesting that fibrolamellar bone tissue correlates strongly with both phylogeny and body size in these predators. His analysis of spinosaurid theropods provided critical evidence for semi-aquatic adaptations through bone histology. His study of a Brazilian spinosaurine tibia revealed osteosclerotic conditions—characterized by extremely high bone compactness (0.872)—similar to those found in Spinosaurus aegyptiacus. This research demonstrated that pachyosteosclerotic bone density represented an adaptation for buoyancy control in aquatic environments, extending the temporal range of this specialization by at least 10 million years prior to the Moroccan Spinosaurus.

Aureliano's studies of crocodyliform bone histology have revealed complex growth strategies and physiological adaptations. His analysis of Pissarrachampsa sera, a baurusuchid crocodyliform from the Upper Cretaceous Adamantina Formation of Southeast Brazil, demonstrated remarkable histological variability among skeletal elements within a single individual. The study revealed fibrolamellar bone tissue with varied vascularization patterns—including radial, reticular, plexiform, laminar, and longitudinal canals—indicating differential growth rates, with the tibia exhibiting the fastest growth and the fibula the slowest. He also explored how fossil diagenesis and taphonomic processes affect osteohistological analysis and the reliability of paleobiological interpretations.

Aureliano's pterosaur research has contributed to understanding flight evolution and growth dynamics in these aerial reptiles. His contributions to the histological analysis of a large dsungaripteroid femur from the Kimmeridgian of Portugal revealed rapid, uninterrupted growth patterns that continued until skeletal maturity, representing some of the fastest growth rates documented in Jurassic pterosaurs. The presence of an external fundamental system confirmed adult status, while the predominance of fibrolamellar tissue indicated sustained high metabolic rates necessary for powered flight.

His work on Brazilian pterosaurs from the Romualdo Formation demonstrated the utility of histological analysis for ontogenetic assessment, revealing subadult status in specimens that had not yet reached sexual maturity despite substantial body size.

Collaborations with his team on Pleistocene carnivores have provided insights into extinction mechanisms and paleobiology of Quaternary megafauna. His comparative analysis of Smilodon populator and Puma concolor femora from Northeastern Brazil revealed differential growth strategies between extinct and surviving carnivore lineages. The sabertooth cat exhibited fibrolamellar tissue organization typical of young adults, while the fossil puma showed extensive secondary remodeling characteristic of mature individuals.

Throughout his paleohistological research, Aureliano and his colleagues emphasized the importance of methodological rigor and technical innovation. His work has integrated traditional thin-sectioning approaches with advanced CT scanning and three-dimensional reconstruction techniques, providing a comprehensive analysis of both external morphology and internal microstructure. He has developed standardized protocols for distinguishing between different types of mineralized tissues, including criteria for differentiating lamellar bone fibers, Sharpey's fibers, and pneumosteal bone based on optical mineralogy characteristics.

=== Skeletal Pneumaticity and Vertebral Anatomy ===
Aureliano is an internationally recognized expert in skeletal pneumaticity and evolutionary vertebral anatomy among archosaurs. His pioneering work has shown that postcranial skeletal pneumaticity (PSP), and the interpreted invasion of bones by air-sac diverticula, developed independently multiple times in dinosaur and pterosaur evolution. This work challenged previous notions that vertebral pneumaticity originated in a single lineage, revealing instead a complex and mosaic evolutionary history.

Aureliano demonstrated the earliest evidence of postcranial pneumaticity in Triassic stem-pterosaurs, namely Venetoraptor, using micro-CT imaging. His research supports the hypothesis that the evolution of air sacs and internal vertebral pneumatic structures predated true powered flight in early pterosaur lineages and facilitated major transitions in vertebrate physiology and biomechanics.

Among ornithischian dinosaurs, his team revealed that hadrosaur (Huallasaurus) vertebrae from Patagonia possess a dense trabecular matrix and lack invasive air sacs, differing markedly from the pneumatised bones seen in theropods and sauropods.

Aureliano further contributed to the understanding of vertebral anatomy and pneumaticity in theropods and sauropods by describing the variability of pneumatic structures and their relationships to the development of the avian-style respiratory system.

One of his most significant discoveries was the identification of protocamerae tissue in the Late Triassic sauropodomorph Macrocollum itaquii. This represents the chronologically oldest and phylogenetically earliest unambiguous evidence of an invasive air sac system in a dinosaur, challenging previous hypotheses about skeletal pneumatization evolution.

=== Paleopathology ===
Aureliano led investigations into both pathological and parasitological conditions in dinosaur fossils. He and colleagues provided the first fossil evidence of blood parasites inside the vascular canals of a titanosaur (Ibirania parva) from the Upper Cretaceous of Brazil, revealing a co-occurrence of acute osteomyelitis and blood parasite infestation. Recent work expanded the spectrum of dinosaur paleopathologies by documenting several cases of osteomyelitis—chronic bone infection—in sauropod limb and axial bones from the Bauru Group, Brazil. Reactive bone growth exhibited a range of morphologies, including circular bumps, fingerprint-like ellipsoid protrusions, and enlarged bone scars, all interpreted as evidence of chronic infection that was fatal for afflicted individuals.

=== Morphometry and taxonomic studies ===
His morphometric research includes a detailed analysis of Purussaurus brasiliensis, an extinct giant crocodilian, where he utilized regression equations based on modern crocodilians to provide novel bite-force estimations. The study revealed that this Late Miocene "super crocodile" had bite forces approximately twice as strong as Tyrannosaurus rex.

=== Taphonomic research ===
Aureliano's work has advanced understanding of how taphonomic processes affect the preservation of histological evidence for vertebral pneumaticity. His research with the Brazilian titanosaur Uberabatitan ribeiroi demonstrated that diagenetic processes can obliterate traces of pneumosteal bone, emphasizing the importance of understanding diagenetic history when studying pneumatic tissues.

== Species discoveries ==
As part of his studies, Tito took part in research into the extinct super crocodilian Purussaurus, and Sousatitan. He also co-described Ibirania parva, one of the smallest known titanosaurs at only 5.7 meters long, representing the first confirmed dwarf titanosaur species in the Americas.

== Science communication and advocacy ==
He is also active in scientific communication, and his studio produces literary, audiovisual and gaming material with more than 200 works and distribution in more than 40 countries.

=== Ubirajara repatriation campaign ===
Aureliano was also one of the major supporters of the #UbirajaraBelongstoBR campaign (Ubirajara belongs to Brazil), a campaign created by paleontologist Aline Ghilardi so that, 27 years after being removed from Brazil illegally and brought to a German museum, the fossil of the dinosaur Ubirajara jubatus would return to its country of origin. The campaign was successful, with the fossil being officially returned to Brazil in June 2023 and now housed at the Plácido Cidade Nuvens Paleontology Museum at the Universidade Regional do Cariri.

== Current position ==
He is currently an associate researcher of the DINOlab - Diversity, Ichnology and Osteohistology Laboratory, Federal University of Rio Grande do Norte, with paleontologist Aline Ghilardi. He also maintains affiliations with the Universidade Regional do Cariri.

== Personal life ==
Tito Aureliano is married to paleontologist Aline Ghilardi. He is also the great-grandson of Rodolfo Aureliano, one of the first Afro-Brazilian judges in Brazil.

== Works in fiction ==
- 2012: Mesozoic tales (Fiction; board game);
- 2016: Dino Hazard: Realidade Oculta (Fiction; novel);
- 2021: Dino Hazard: Comics - Vol.1 (Fiction; Graphic Novel; co-authorship with Márcio L. Castro)
- 2023: A Ascensão de um Império (Nonfiction; book; co-authorship with Aline M. Ghilardi)
- 2023: Dino Hazard: Chronos Blackout (Fiction; video game; co-authorship with Aline M. Ghilardi)
