= Aline Ghilardi =

Brazilian palaeontologist, researcher, university professor and influencer

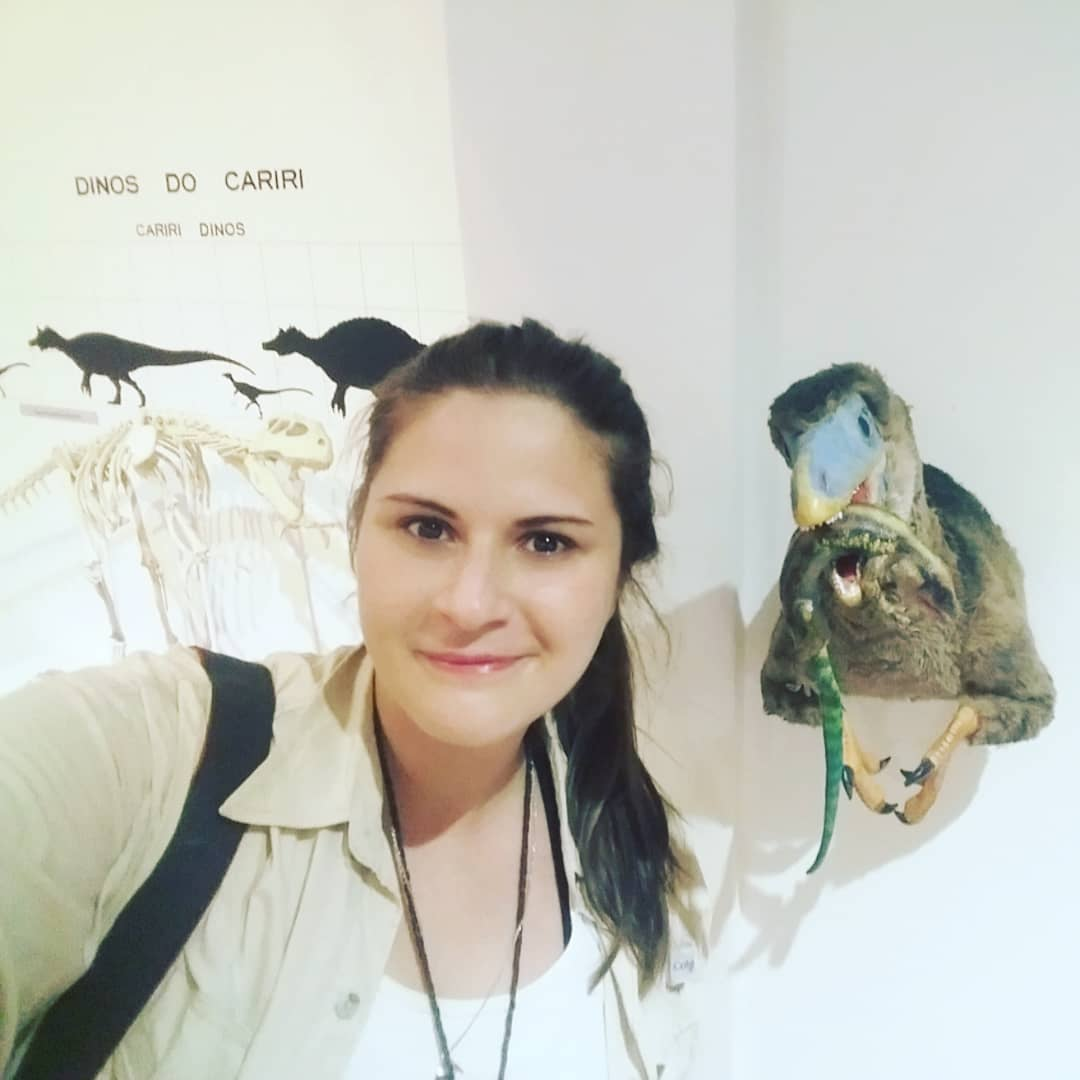
- Aline Ghilardi in 2023
- Born: 8 June 1986 (age 40); Brazil
- Education: Federal University of São Carlos; Federal University of Rio de Janeiro
- Known for: "Colecionadores de Ossos (Bone Collectors)", Paleozoology, Paleoecology, Paleoichnology, and Ubirajara
- Spouse: Tito Aureliano
- Scientific career
- Fields: Paleontologist, Researcher, Biologist, Science communicator
- Workplaces: Federal University of Rio Grande do Norte

Aline Marcele Ghilardi (born 8 June 1986) is a Brazilian biologist and palaeontologist. She was one of those responsible for the return of the "Ubirajara jubatus" dinosaur fossil to Brazil in 2023 by promoting the Ubirajara belongs to Brazil campaign (#UbirajaraBelongstoBR). She is currently a professor and researcher at the Federal University of Rio Grande do Norte.

== Career ==
Ghilardi was born on 8 June 1986, in São Paulo. She graduated from UFSCar, where she did her post-doctorate in 2019, her master's degree in Ecology and Natural Resources from PPGERN-UFSCar in 2017, and her doctorate in Geology from PPG-GI UFRJ in 2015.

Since 2020, she has been the coordinator of DINOlab - Diversity, Ichnology and Osteohistology Laboratory, linked to the Federal University of Rio Grande do Norte (UFRN), where she has been teaching since 2019. The focus of her research over the last 15 years has been on palaeoichnology, palaeoecology and palaeohistology. Ghilardi also carries out research into the physiology and diseases of extinct beings. She was one of the researchers who discovered a parasite preserved inside dinosaur bones; the research was published in October 2020 in the scientific journal Cretaceous Research. She has published articles on paleontology in Nature and journals from publishing houses such as PLOS, Elsevier, and Wiley-Blackwell.

In 2018, she coordinated studies in the city of Sousa, Paraíba, to study dinosaur footprints more than 136 million years old that were being destroyed by erosion caused by animals stepping on the ground. In an interview with Diário do Sertão, she said that the action was urgent and aimed to preserve historical heritage.

Ghilardi and her husband, fellow palaeontologist Tito Aureliano, are responsible for the YouTube channel Colecionadores de Ossos. In May 2019, she took part in Conversa com Bial show, talking about the possibility of recreating dinosaurs. In 2021, she took part in Folha de S.Paulo's Habitat podcast.

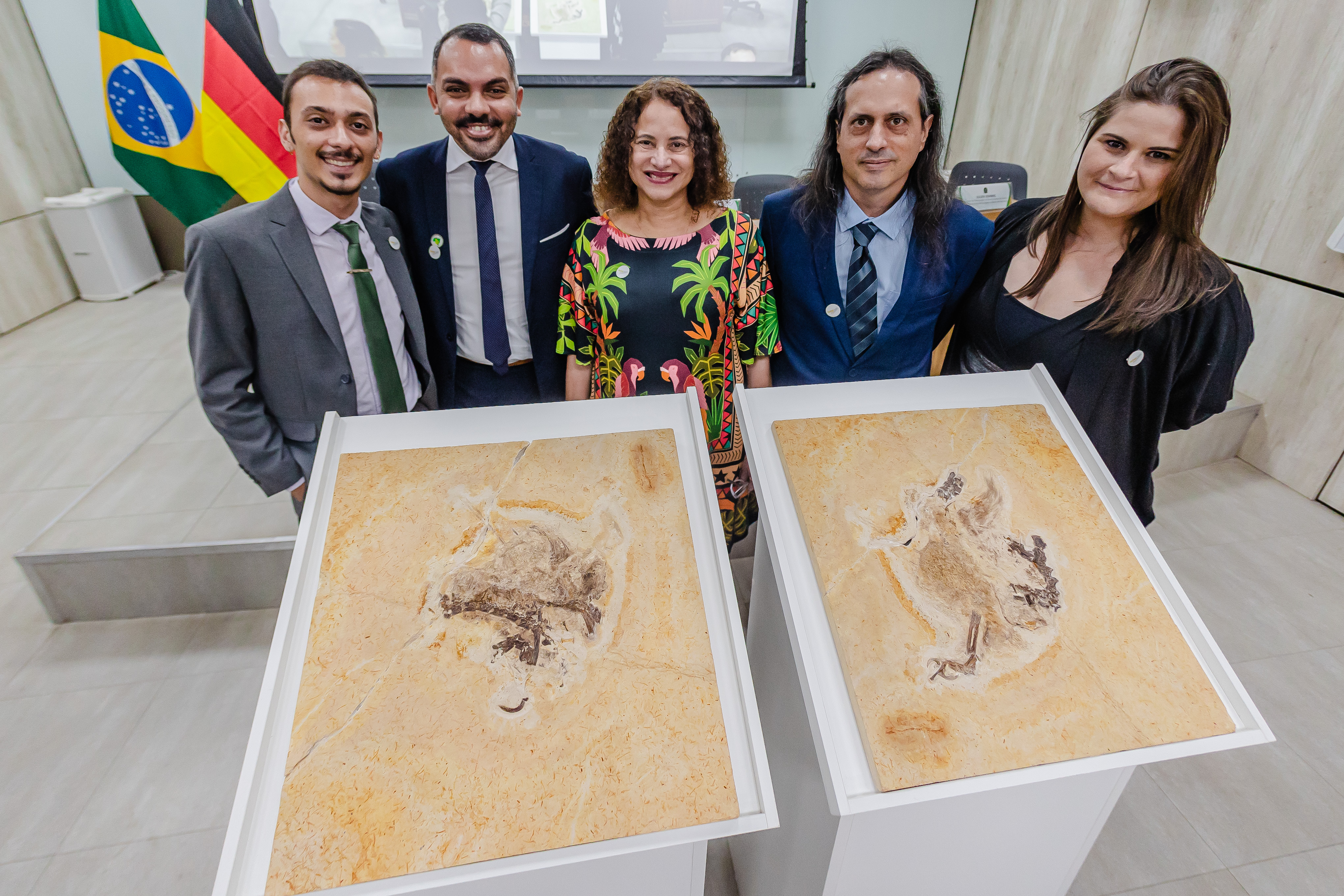
Aline Ghilardi (at the right) at the Ubirajara fossil repatriation ceremony

Ghilardi was responsible for the "#UbirajaraBelongstoBR" campaign to retrieve the "Ubirajara jubatus" fossil, which had been illegally removed from Brazil to Germany. In July 2022, twenty-seven years after its removal, German authorities decided that the fossil should be returned to Brazil. This was done in June 2023.
