= Universidade Regional do Cariri =

Brazilian state public university

Coordinates: 7.2381°S 39.4159°W

Regional University of Cariri
- Motto: Felix ad Satvm
- Motto in English: Happy to sow
- Type: Public
- Established: June 9, 1986
- Provost: Carlos Kleber
- Rector: Lima Junior
- Location: Crato, Ceará, Brazil
- Website: http://www.urca.br

The Universidade Regional do Cariri (URCA) (English: Cariri Regional University) is a Brazilian state public university with its administrative headquarters in the city of Crato, with other campuses in the city of Juazeiro do Norte and decentralized units in Iguatu, Campos Sales and Missão Velha. Additionally, it encompasses the Plácido Cidade Nuvens Paleontology Museum in Santana do Cariri. URCA serves an academic community of approximately 12,500 students from around 111 municipalities in the states of Ceará, Piauí, Pernambuco and Paraíba, distributed between undergraduate education, special programs and lato sensu postgraduate education.

It was created by State Law No. 11.191, of June 9, 1986, in the form of a special regime autarchy and authorized by Decree No. 94.016, of February 11, 1987. It was officially installed on March 7, 1987. It is part of the state's Higher Education System and is linked to the Department of Science and Technology. The staff composition includes 238 technical-administrative employees, both permanent and outsourced, 371 permanent professors, 153 temporary professors, and 80 substitute professors. With the latest public competition, the admission of over 90 professors was approved, the majority of whom joined the university with extension projects to increase the number of researchers in the region.

These employees, staff, and professors are distributed across six campuses: three in the municipality of Crato (Pimenta, São Miguel, and São Francisco), two in the municipality of Juazeiro do Norte (CRAJUBAR and Pirajá), and one in Santana do Cariri, where the Paleontology Museum operates. This museum showcases one of the most important reserves of fossils from the Cretaceous period.

Today, the university has 33 undergraduate, master's and doctoral programs. There are also 45 postgraduate courses, four Special Pedagogical Training Programs and two residencies, one in Multiprofessional Collective Health and the other in Obstetric Nursing.

== History ==
URCA began its activities with courses in Economic Sciences, Law and Civil Construction Technology from the State University of Ceará (UECE) and courses from the Padre Ibiapina Foundation (Crato Faculty of Philosophy) — Natural History, Geography, Literature and Pedagogy.

Since its creation until 2019, URCA has graduated 20,993 students, 18,285 from Crajubar (Crato and Juazeiro), 1,806 from the Iguatu Decentralized Unit, 194 from the Missão Velha Decentralized Unit and 708 from the Campos Sales Decentralized Unit. URCA also trained 302 students in the Freire Platform program, the National Basic Education Teacher Training Plan (PARFOR) and 207 in the undergraduate course of the special pedagogical training program, with poles spread throughout the region.

In its 33 years, URCA has modernized its infrastructure and made progress with improvement projects, with the expansion of the Crajubar and Pimenta campuses. Teaching qualifications began in 1990 and currently the teaching staff consists of 140 doctors, 140 masters, 44 specialists and 06 undergraduates.

URCA is the only Brazilian university with a UNESCO-recognized geopark, the Araripe Geopark, and one of the country's leading paleontology museums, the Plácido Cidade Nuvens Paleontology Museum. It also has a Legal Practice Center and an Accessibility Center.

== Rectors and Vice-Rectors ==
Rector	Vice-Rector	Years
Antônio Martins Filho		1986–1987
José Teodoro Soares	Gonçalo Farias Filho	1987–1990
Manuel Edmilson do Nascimento	Gonçalo Farias Filho	1990–1996
Maria Violeta Arraes de Alencar Gervaiseau	Plácido Cidade Nuvens	1996–2003
André Luiz Herzog Cardoso	José Nilton de Figueiredo	2003–2007
Plácido Cidade Nuvens	Antônia Otonite de Oliveira Cortez	2007–2011
Otonite de Oliveira Cortez	José Patrício Pereira de Melo	2011–2015
José Patrício Pereira Melo	Francisco do O´ de Lima Júnior	2015–2019
Francisco do O´ de Lima Júnior	Carlos Kleber Nascimento de Oliveira	2019–Current

== See also ==
- List of universities in Brazil by state
