= Trigonopterus oblongus =

Scientific classification
- Kingdom: Animalia
- Phylum: Arthropoda
- Clade: Pancrustacea
- Class: Insecta
- Order: Coleoptera
- Suborder: Polyphaga
- Infraorder: Cucujiformia
- Superfamily: Curculionoidea
- Family: Curculionidae
- Genus: Trigonopterus
- Species: T. oblongus

Binomial name
- Trigonopterus oblongus (Pascoe, 1885)

Species of beetle

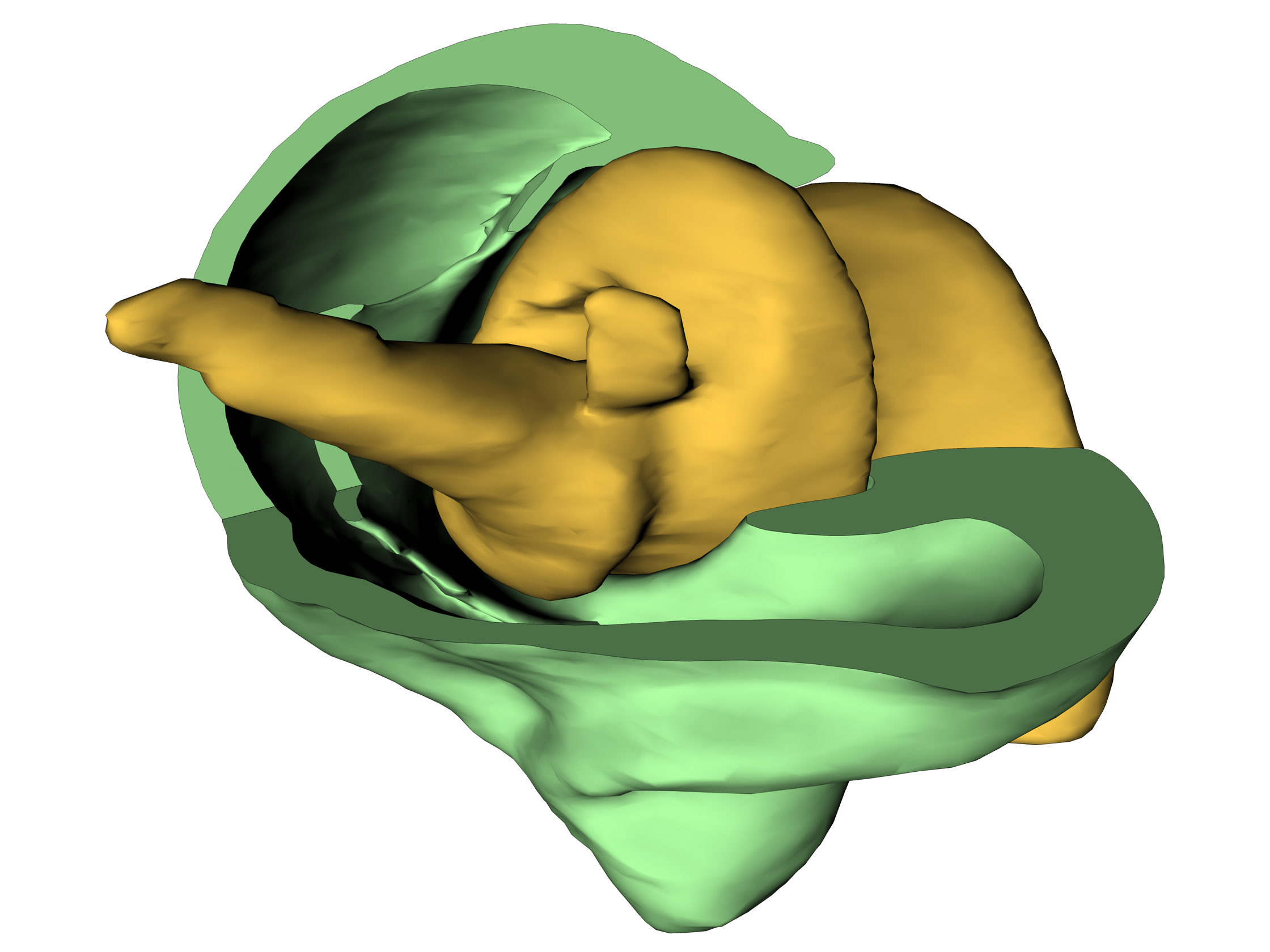
Diagram of the biological screw in the weevil Trigonopterus oblongus

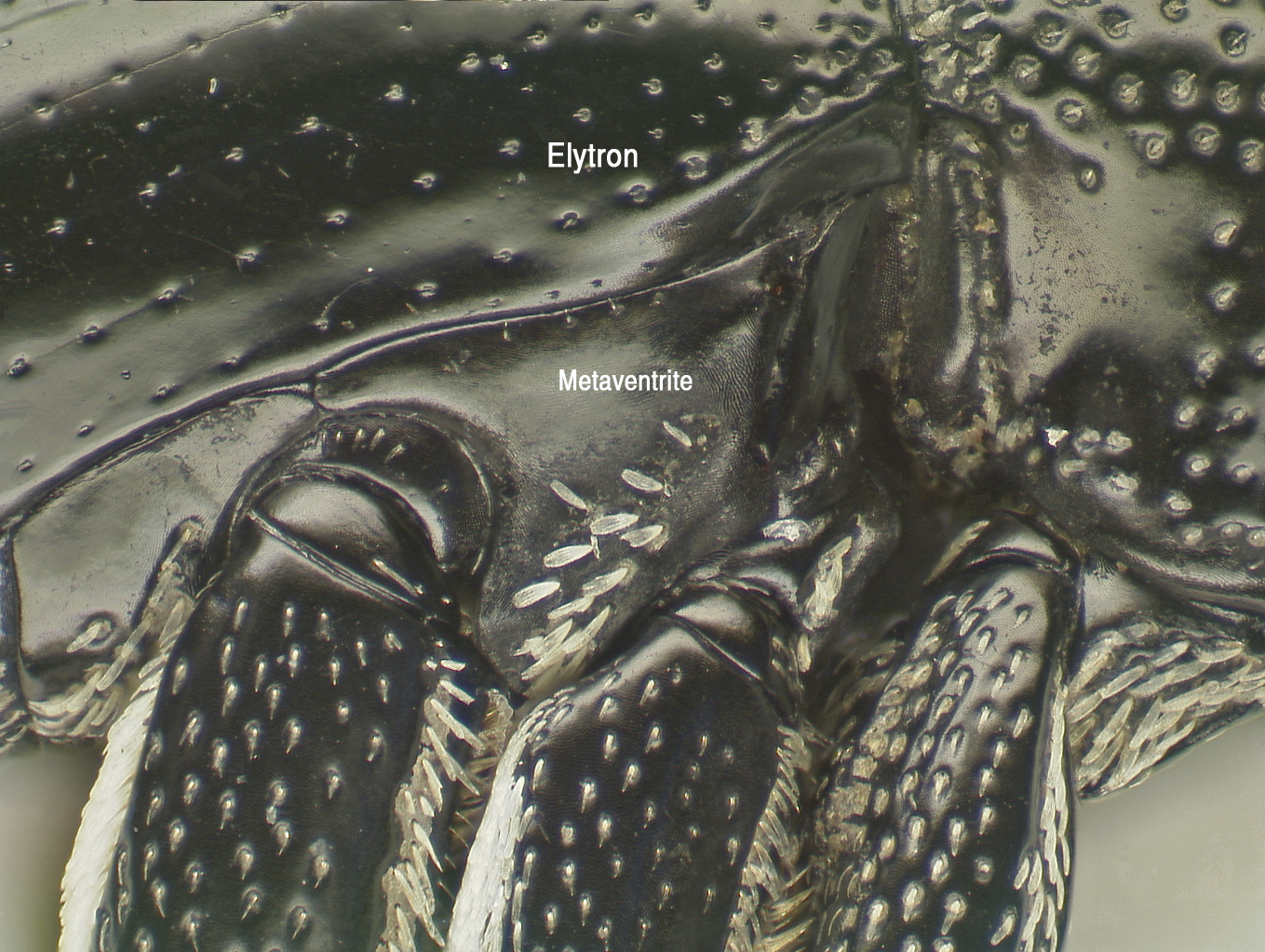
The lateral aspect on thorax of the weevil Trigonopterus oblongus. In this genus, the metanepisternite is absent and the elytron touches the metaventrite (indicated).

Trigonopterus oblongus is a weevil found in Papua. It was notable as the first known instance of a biological screw joint. The weevils are just 4 millimetres (0.16 in) long and can fold their legs below their body. The biological screw joint is just 0.5 millimetres (0.020 in) in size. This discovery was made by Alexander Riedel of the State Museum of Natural History Karlsruhe and by Thomas van de Kamp of the Karlsruhe Institute of Technology .
