= Federal University of Cariri =

Brazilian federal university

Federal University of Cariri

The Federal University of Cariri (Portuguese: Universidade Federal do Cariri, UFCA) is a Brazilian federal public higher education institution, created in 2013 and based in the city of Juazeiro do Norte, in the state of Ceará. It has campus in the cities of Crato, Barbalha, Brejo Santo and Icó.

The Federal University of Cariri is the result of the dismemberment of the Cariri Campus of the Federal University of Ceará (UFC). Its dismemberment was sanctioned by the law nº 12.825, sanctioned by Dilma Rousseff, president of the country at the time. The UFC becomes a tutor of the implantation, providing necessary administrative support to the total installation of the new university.

== Courses ==
Undergraduate and postgraduate courses:

Campi	Curses	Graduation or post graduation	Course mode
Barbalha	Medicine	Undergraduate	Bachelor
Brejo Santo	Interdisciplinary in Natural Sciences and Mathematics	Undergraduate	
Crato	Agronomy	Undergraduate	Bachelor
Crato	Sustainable Regional Development	Post graduation	Master's degree
Icó	History	Undergraduate	Bachelor
Juazeiro do Norte	Administration	Undergraduate	Bachelor
Juazeiro do Norte	Public Administration	Undergraduate	Bachelor
Juazeiro do Norte	Biblioteconomy	Undergraduate	Bachelor
Juazeiro do Norte	Computer Science	Undergraduate	Bachelor
Juazeiro do Norte	Journalism	Undergraduate	Bachelor
Juazeiro do Norte	Product Design	Undergraduate	Technologist
Juazeiro do Norte	Civil Engineering	Undergraduate	Bachelor
Juazeiro do Norte	Materials Engineering	Undergraduate	Bachelor
Juazeiro do Norte	Philosophy	Undergraduate	Bachelor
Juazeiro do Norte	Music	Undergraduate	
Juazeiro do Norte	Water resources	Post graduation	Master's degree
Juazeiro do Norte	Mathematics	Post graduation	Master's degree
Executive Marketing Management	Post graduation	Specialization	

== See also ==
- Federal University of Ceará
- Universidade da Integração Internacional da Lusofonia Afro-Brasileira
- List of federal universities of Brazil
