= Biological screw joint =

Naturally occurring form of screw joint

The biological screw joint is a naturally occurring form of the screw joint, a mechanical device that combines rotational movement with single-axis translation. Alexander Riedel of the State Museum of Natural History Karlsruhe and Thomas van de Kamp of the Karlsruhe Institute of Technology discovered it in specimens of Trigonopterus oblongus, a weevil found in Papua.

== Discovery ==
Anatomical examination was made for specimens of the weevil species Trigonopterus oblongus, provided by the Karlsruhe State Museum of Natural History, using a microtomograph at the Institute of Synchrotron Radiation (ANKA) of Karlsruhe Institute of Technology. The analysis revealed that the weevils had a nut-and-screw system for the hip-leg joint.

== Mechanism ==
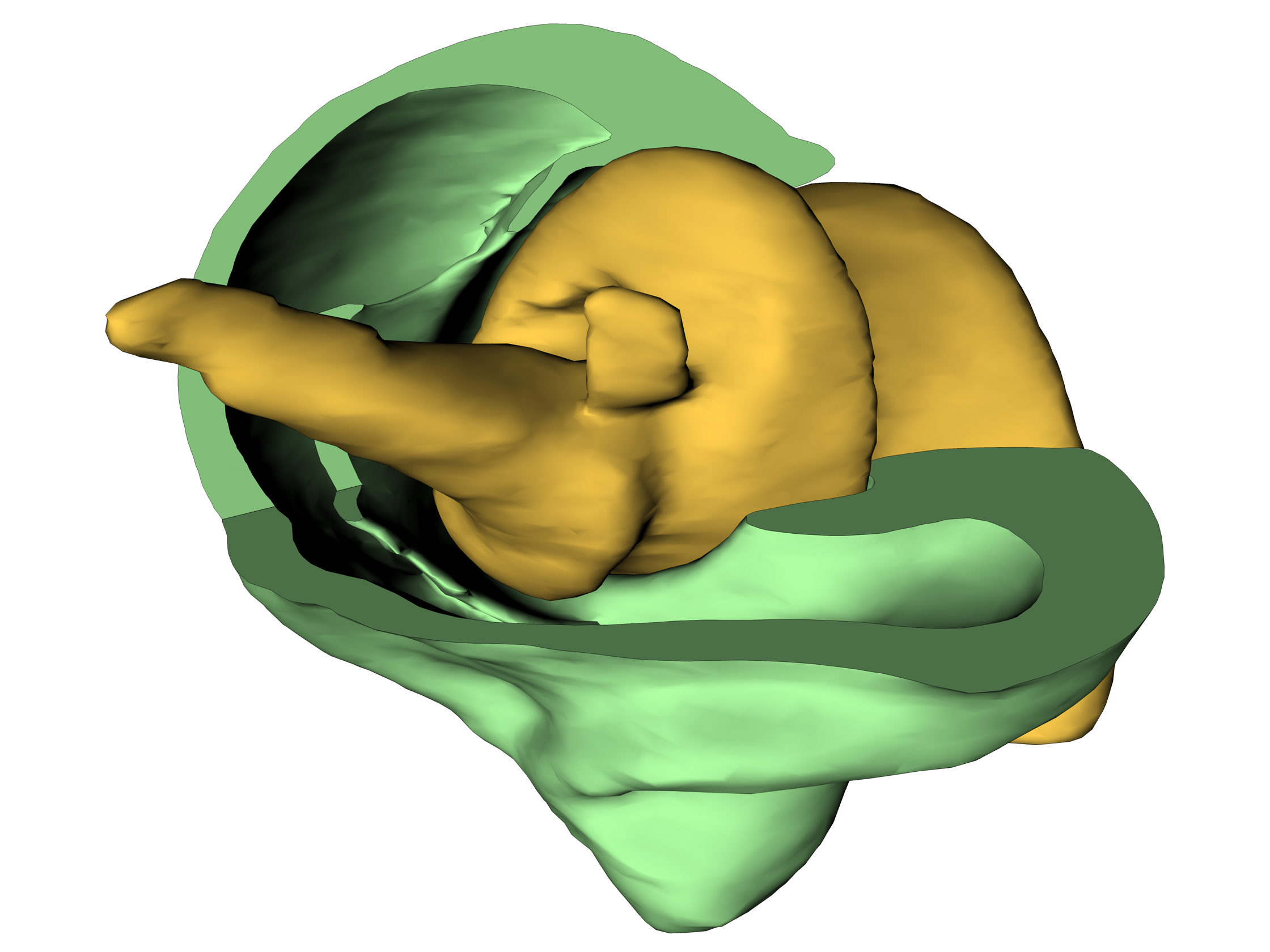
Diagram of the biological screw in the weevil Trigonopterus oblongus

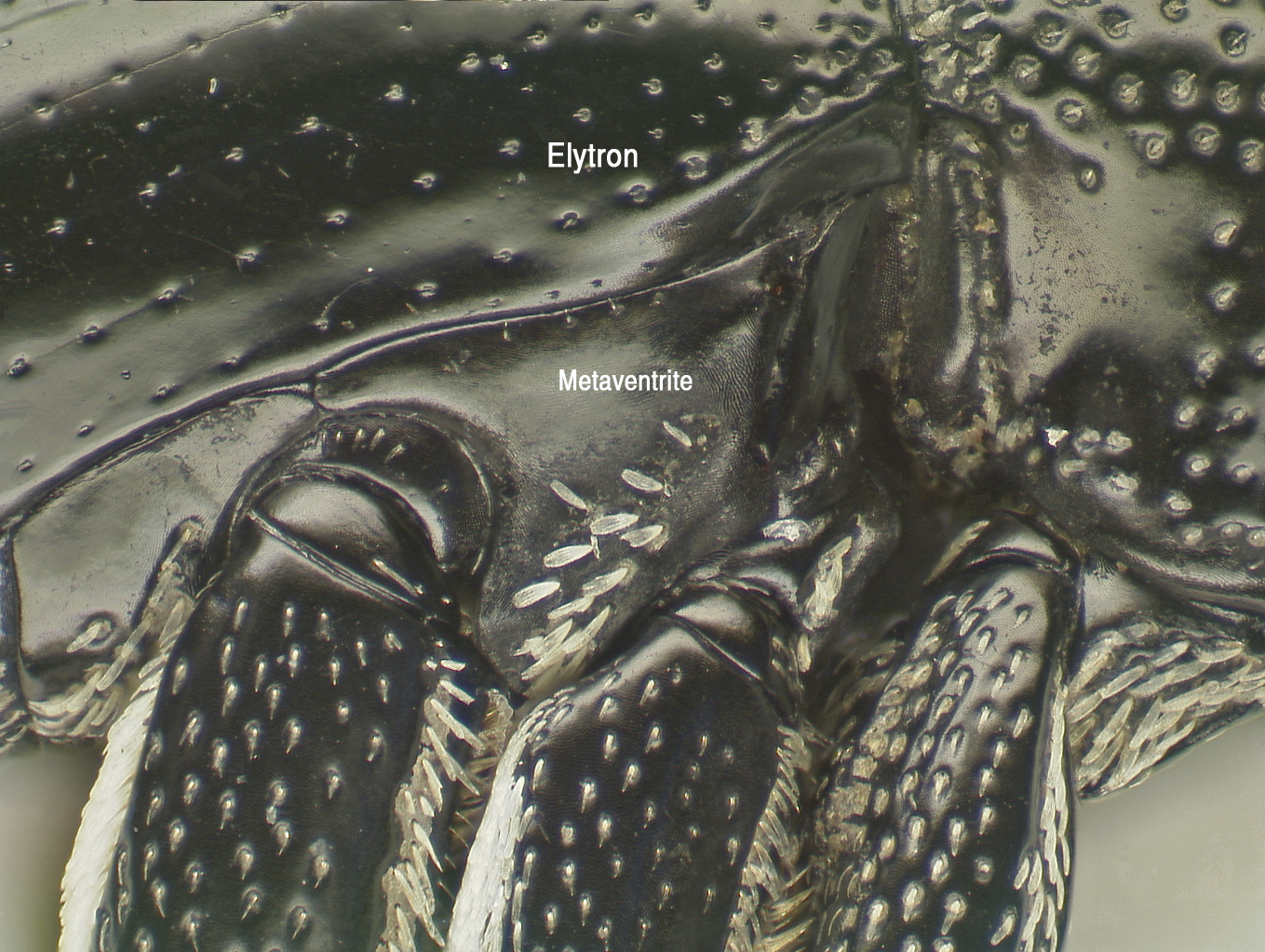
The lateral aspect on thorax of the weevil Trigonopterus oblongus. In this genus, the metanepisternite is absent and the elytron touches the metaventrite (indicated).

The mechanism has been described as "rotational movement combined with a single-axis translation".

The arthropod hip–leg joint consists of two parts – the coxa (or the hip) and the trochanter (or the head of the arthropod leg femur). The coxa, in the case of weevils, resembles a nut, and it has a thread running along its inner surface with an angular span of 345°. The trochanter resembles the screw. It is rod-shaped with a large external spiral flange, having an angular span of 410°, in excess of a full circle, which functions as a thread. When the leg muscles of a beetle are stretched, the screw turns. Though the screw-thread provide for very large angular rotation, the front legs of weevils are capable of rotating by 90°, while their hind legs can rotate by 130°.

The weevils are just 4 millimetres (0.16 in) long and can fold their legs below their body. The joint is just 0.5 millimetres (0.020 in) in size. Before this was discovered, all known hip-leg joints have been based on either the ball and socket joint system for hip-leg connections, as in humans, as hinges or as saddle joints. The discovery is the first ever instance of a musculoskeletal nut-and-screw system in the animal kingdom.

== Evolution ==
The screw-and-nut system has been found to be present in all 15 weevils examined by the scientists and appears to be a hitherto unknown anatomical feature of weevils. It has been estimated that weevils evolved this system about 100 million years ago. It is surmised that the development of this feature provided additional flexibility which permitted weevils to improve their climbing abilities, keep steady when at rest, and have stronger leverage for piercing by the snout.

== See also ==
- Issus, one of many planthoppers that have a "biological gear" mechanism in the nymph stage
