= Hermes Carleial =

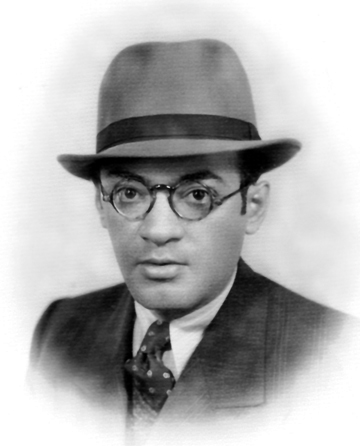
- Born: Hermes Carleial; 30 March 1904; Barbalha, Ceará, Brazil
- Died: 6 July 1954 (aged 50); Fortaleza, Ceará, Brazil
- Education: Federal University of Ceará
- Occupations: Poet, lawyer, accountant, writer
- Spouse: Maria do Carmo Mendes Frota
- Writing career
- Pen name: Marquez do Vale, Sousa Neto
- Notable works: Cariry, Rapsódia Cearense, Ao Clarim do Destino
- Literary movement: Romanticism

Hermes Carleial (30 March 1904 – 6 July 1954) was a Brazilian poet, lawyer, accountant and writer.

== Biography ==
Hermes Carleial was born in the city of Barbalha, in the State of Ceará, in 1904. He was the second child in a family of seven brothers and two sisters. His parents were José Bernardino Carvalho Leite, a self-taught lawyer, entrepreneur, and local champion of literacy, and Antônia Alves Carvalho Leite. His mother had been taught to read by his father at a farm twelve years before they married in 1899. Hermes started his studies in Barbalha and finished high school in Fortaleza, Ceará, at Colégio São Luis. He then began working in local trade. In 1926 he received a diploma in accountancy at the Escola de Comércio Fênix Caixeral as valedictorian. In 1933 he married Maria do Carmo Mendes Frota. They had three daughters.

Hermes Carleial graduated in Law at the Faculdade de Direito do Ceará, but he decided not to become a practicing lawyer like his father. He preferred to continue in business. In 1940, he established his own commercial representation office, Representações e Conta Própria Carleial & Cia. Ltda.. His business included international trading, especially with North America.

He wrote for magazines and newspapers published in Fortaleza and Rio de Janeiro City, as O Povo, O Estado, Jornal das Moças and Revista Fon-Fon. In 1952 his work Rapsódia Cearense won the José Albano prize in the poetry genre, promoted by the Education Department of Fortaleza.

He died in Fortaleza in 1954 a victim of a stroke (cerebrovascular accident) subsequent to a hypertensive emergency.

== Works ==
- Cariry (Fortaleza, Ceará, 1931)
- Ao Clarim do Destino (Fortaleza, Ceará, 1935)
- Rapsódia Cearense (Fortaleza, Ceará, 1987)
- Rio Formoso

Excerpt (translated from Portuguese):

"Just as nocturnal birds,

In their own way, are fond of darkness,

There are such men that are friends with taciturn places,

Averse to light and brightness."
