= Antônio Martins Filho =

Brazilian jurist

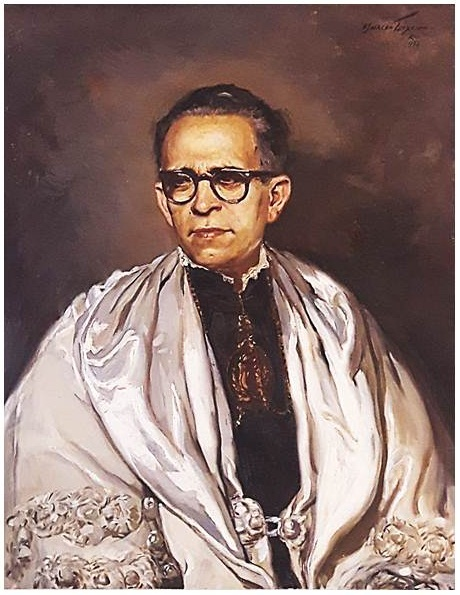
- Born: December 22, 1904; Crato, Ceará, Brazil
- Died: December 20, 2002 (aged 97); Fortaleza, Brazil
- Education: Piauí Law School
- Occupations: Lawyer, writer, teacher
- Employer(s): Federal University of Ceará, Institute of Ceará, Ceará State University

Antônio Martins Filho (22 December 1904, Crato, Brazil – 20 December 2002, Fortaleza, Brazil) was a Brazilian jurist. One of the most eminent promoters of the founding of the first university in Ceará, he became the chancellor of that institution, which is now known as the Federal University of Ceará, when it was established in 1954.

== Biography ==
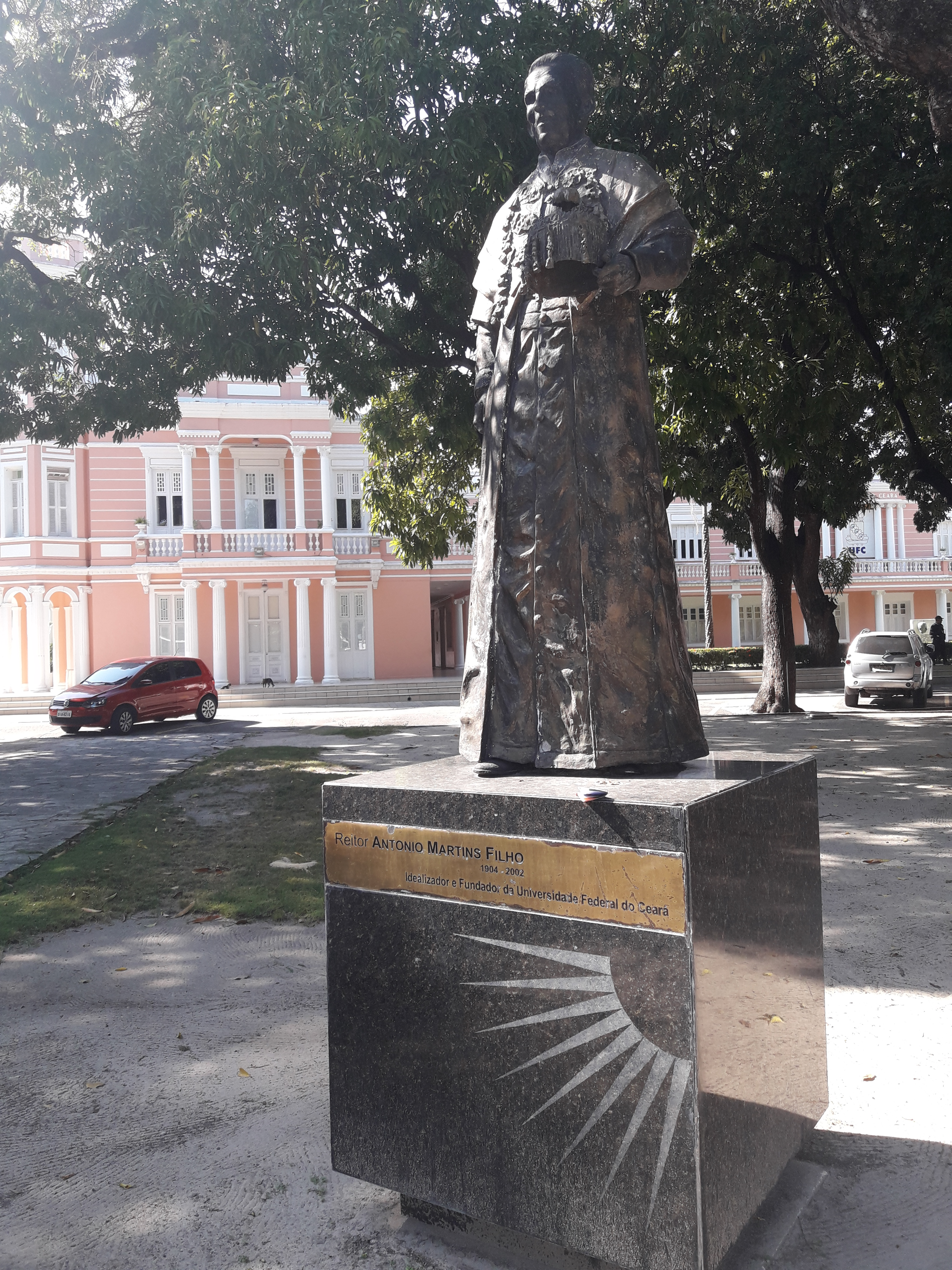
Statue of Rector Antônio Martins Filho at the Rectory of the Federal University of Ceará

In 1948, he took the lead in the process of creating the former University of Ceará, now known as UFC. The university was finally established in 1954 and inaugurated in 1955. Until 1967, Martins Filho served as the chancellor and continued to develop the university's infrastructure, establishing the University Press, acquiring the current Chancellor's Office building and the Casa de José de Alencar, and creating conditions for the university's continued growth.

He retired in 1974 but also founded the State University of Ceará – UECE in 1977 and the Regional University of Cariri – URCA in 1986. He was a member of the National Education Council in the 1960s, remaining on the council for 13 years. He represented Brazil at the OAS in the Latin American Committee for the Evaluation of Scholarship Systems. He contributed to the founding of over 20 Brazilian universities.

He was the brother of the writer and jurist Fran Martins, one of the most prominent scholars of Commercial Law in Brazil in the 20th century. Fran Martins was a Professor at the Faculty of Law of the Federal University of Ceará and an important member of the modernist movement in Ceará's literature during the 1930s, 1940s, and 1950s. He had an extensive body of work and was a founding member of the Clã Group.

Martins Filho was admitted to the Order of Military Merit in 1994 as a special Officer by President Itamar Franco. He was promoted to the rank of Commander by Fernando Henrique Cardoso in 2000.

He died in Fortaleza on December 20, 2002, at age 97, due to multiple organ failure.

== Works ==
- A presença da poesia no mundo dos negócios (1978)
- Três anos de FUNEDUCE: subsídios para a história da Universidade Estadual do Ceará (1979)
- Autonomia das universidades federais (1980)
- Historia abreviada da UFC: 1944 a 1967 (1996)

== Tributes ==
- Several streets across Brazil bear his name.
- Schools named in his honor.
- A viaduct in Fortaleza bears his name as a form of homage.
- The URCA, Regional University of Cariri, established the Antônio Martins Filho Merit Medal, an award created in 2003 to honor institutions and personalities who have contributed to the development of culture and the promotion of regional values.
- The UECE, in 2003, established the Reitor Antônio Martins Filho Merit Medal, which encompasses five categories: Scientific, Cultural, Administrative, Institutional, and Educational.
- The OAB-CE, in 2010, created the Professor Lawyer Standard Antonio Martins Filho Medal, awarded to lawyers for their work in the legal profession and in Ceará's teaching field.
