= Campos Sales Airport =

Campos Sales Regional Airport Aeroporto Regional de Campos Sales
- IATA: none; ICAO: SNCS; LID: CE0009

Summary
- Airport type: Public
- Operator: Infraero (2023–2025); Visac Aeroportos (2025-present)
- Serves: Campos Sales
- Time zone: BRT (UTC−03:00)
- Elevation AMSL: 615 m / 2,018 ft
- Coordinates: 07°03′06″S 040°21′30″W
- Website: www4.infraero.gov.br/aeroporto-campos-sales/

Map
- Location in Brazil

Runways
Direction	Length		Surface
Direction	m	ft	Surface
11/29	1,200	3,937	Asphalt

Statistics (2024)
- Passengers: 278
- Aircraft operations: 86
- Metric tonnes of cargo: 0
- Statistics: Infraero; Sources: Airport Website, ANAC, DECEA

Campos Sales Regional Airport (ICAO: SNCS), is an airport serving Campos Sales, Brazil.

It is managed by contract by Visac Aeroportos.

== History ==
Previously operated by Infraero, on April 22, 2025 the State of Ceará signed a one-year contract of operation with Visac Aeroportos.

== Airlines and destinations ==
No scheduled flights operate at this airport.

== Access ==
The airport is located 3 km (2 mi) from downtown Campos Sales.

== See also ==
- List of airports in Brazil
