= Federal University of Ceará =

Federal university in Ceará, Brazil

Ceará Federal University
- Universidade Federal do Ceará
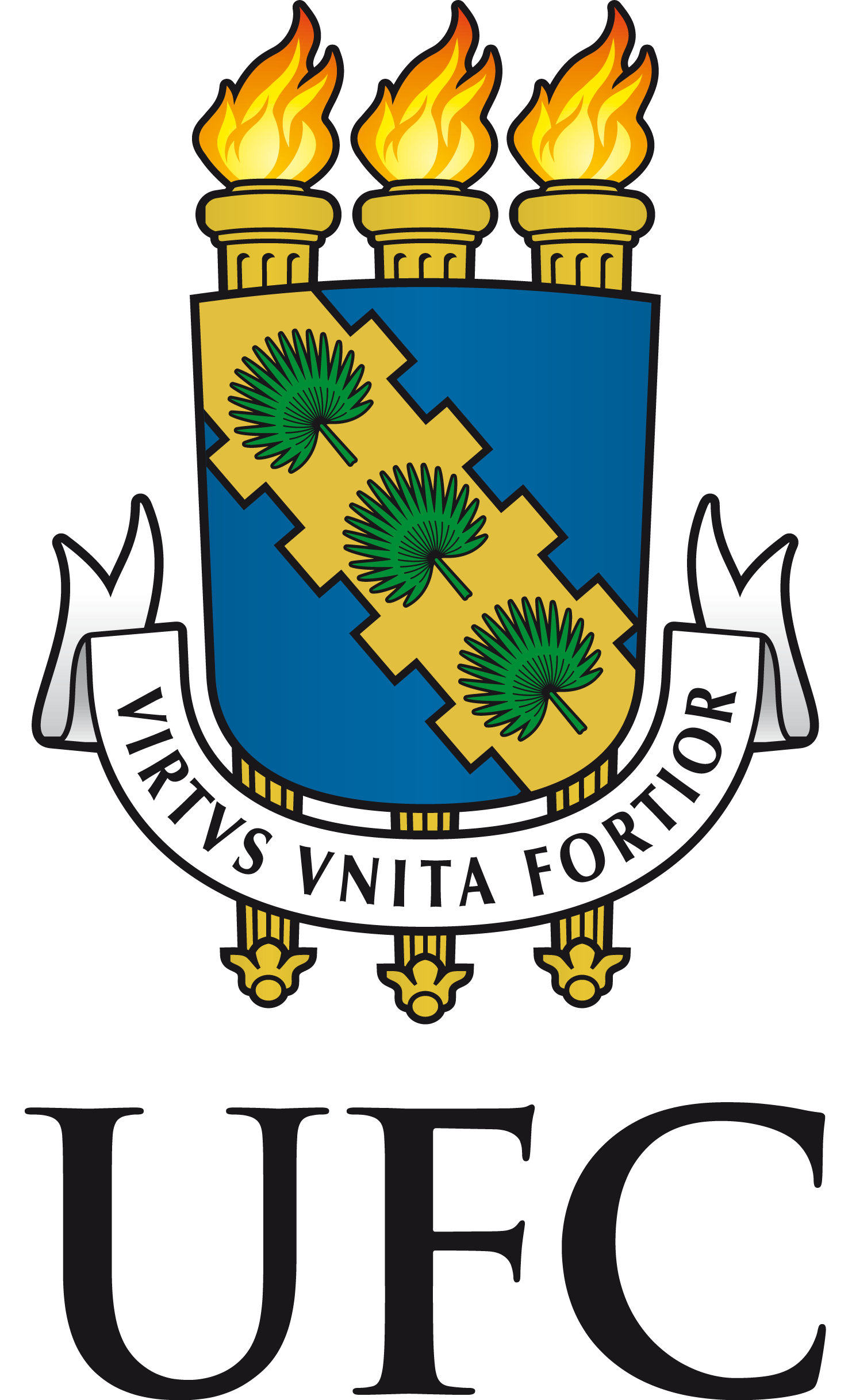
- Other names: UFC
- Motto: Virtvs Vnita Fortior
- Motto in English: The more united the virtues, the stronger
- Type: Public
- Established: 1954; 72 years ago
- Affiliations: CRUB, RENEX
- Endowment: R$1.2 billion (2014)
- Chancellor: Custódio Luís Silva de Almeida
- Vice-Chancellor: Diana Cristina Silva de Azevedo
- Academic staff: 2,052 (1,883 effective) (2012)
- Administrative staff: 1,385 (2007)
- Students: 34,597 (2012)
- Undergraduates: 26,956 (2012)
- Postgraduates: 7,641 (2012)
- Doctoral students: 1,346 (2012)
- Location: Fortaleza, Ceará, Brazil; 3.7416°S 38.5390°W
- Website: www.ufc.br

The Federal University of Ceará (Portuguese: Universidade Federal do Ceará, UFC) is a federal university with campuses in the cities of Fortaleza, Sobral, Russas, Quixadá, Crateús and Itapajé, in the state of Ceará, Brazil. UFC is a public and tuition-free university, with several academic programs in most areas of knowledge.

In Fortaleza, the university has three main campuses: "Campus do Pici", with most of the programs in science and technology areas, "Campus do Benfica", which harbors the university's administration and the programs in humanities, business, and the law school, and the "Campus do Porangabussu", with the medical school. The campus of Sobral has a Medical School, Computer Engineering, Electrical Engineering, Finance, Economy, Dentistry, Psychology and Teaching Music. The campus of Quixadá offers graduations in Information System, Software Engineering, Computer Networks, Computer Science, Computer Engineering, and Digital Design. The campus of Russas is home to courses in Computer Science, Software Engineering, Civil Engineering, Production Engineering, and Mechanical Engineering. The campus of Crateús offers graduations in Computer Science, Environmental and Sanitary Engineering, Civil Engineering, Mining Engineering, and Information System.

== History ==
UFC was created by the Brazilian federal government in 1955 and is under the Ministry of Education. The university was created as the result of great public debate, which had begun in 1949. The main character of this movement was Antônio Martins Filho, an intellectual who became the first director of the recently created "Universidade do Ceará" ('University of Ceará'). The university itself was created by Law #2.373, ratified in December 1954 and began to function on June 25, 1955. Its implementation was owed to the union of the several higher education institutes then present in the city of Fortaleza: the School of Agronomy, the Law College of Ceara, the Medicine College and the Pharmacy & Odontology College. Today, the university consists of four centers of basic science and education and five professional colleges.

== Notable alumni ==
- Ciro Gomes
- Hermes Carleial
- Camilo Santana
- Luizianne Lins
- Socorro Acioli
- Falcão

== See also ==
- Brazil University Rankings
- List of federal universities of Brazil
- Universities and Higher Education in Brazil
- Federal University of Cariri
- Universidade da Integração Internacional da Lusofonia Afro-Brasileira
