= Museu de Paleontologia da Universidade Regional do Cariri =

Brazilian museum

Coordinates: 7°11′10″S 39°44′10″W

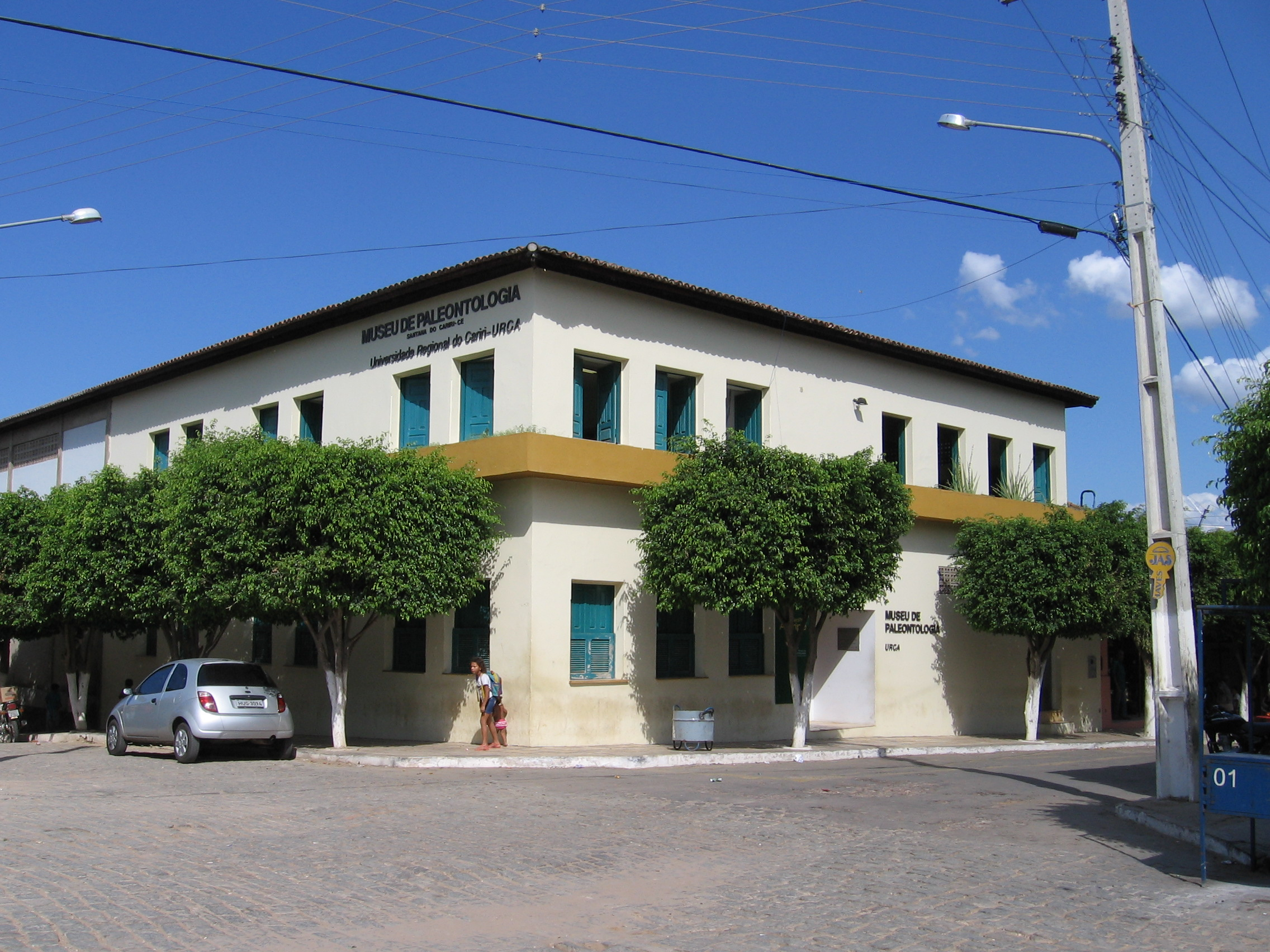
Paleontological museum

Museu de Paleontologia Plácido Cidade Nuvens (English: Plácido Cidade Nuvens Paleontology Museum) is a Brazilian museum that houses a paleontological collection from the Cariri region, belonging to the Regional University of Cariri (URCA). It is located in Santana do Cariri, Ceará, a region that hosts one of the largest concentrations of fossils on the planet, preserving evidence dating back 110 million years.

It is estimated that the museum welcomes around 10,000 visitors each year.

== History ==
The museum was established by Law No. 173/85 on April 18, 1985, originating from the proposal of the then-mayor of Santana do Cariri, Professor Plácido Cidade Nuvens. It was donated to the Regional University of Cariri on April 12, 1988, which authorized a 30-year lease agreement. The museum's inauguration took place on July 26, 1988, and it was officially assumed by URCA in 1991.

By 1997, the museum had become a promoter of paleontological research, scientific outreach, and a supporter of the Cariri region, particularly after the implementation of the Paleontological Complex of Chapada do Araripe in the area.

Regularly, the institution organizes lectures, training sessions, courses, and meetings through the Technological Diffusion Center. This makes the museum a supportive hub for research from all around the globe.
