= State University of Ceará =

Public university in the Brazilian state of Ceará

- Universidade Estadual do Ceará
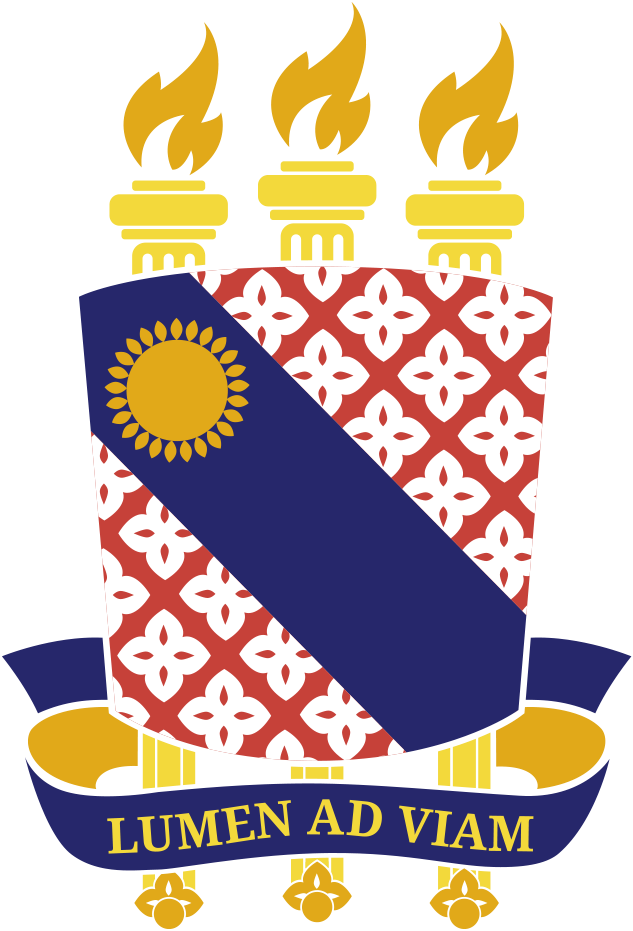
- Other name: UECE
- Motto: Lumen ad Viam
- Motto in English: Illumination for your way
- Type: Public
- Established: 1975
- Affiliations: CRUB, ABRUEM, RENEX
- Endowment: R$52.300.321,00 (2005)
- Chancellor: Hidelbrando dos Santos Soares
- Academic staff: 812 (2013)
- Administrative staff: 357 (2013)
- Students: 21.653 (2013)
- Undergraduates: 18.138(2013)
- Postgraduates: 3.515 (2013)
- Doctoral students: 407 (2013)
- Location: Fortaleza, Ceará, Brazil
- Website: http://www.uece.br/

The State University of Ceará (Portuguese: Universidade Estadual do Ceará, UECE) is a public university in the Brazilian state of Ceará. It is the second largest university in Ceará, the eighth best state university in Brazil and considered the best state university in the North, Northeast and Center-West of the country.

Established in 1975 by the Act No. 9.753 which authorizes the State Executive Branch to create Ceará State Educational Foundation (FUNEDUCE), UECE is the largest state university of Ceará. It is involved in teaching, research and science outreach in many areas of knowledge. Its structure consists of a network of campuses that privileges the courses aimed at the training of teachers. The undergraduate programs in Business Administration, Accounting and Psychology are among the best in the country according to Students Performance National Exam (Enade).

On January 27, 2021, the then governor of Ceará, Camilo Santana, authorized the start of construction of the Ceará University Hospital (HUC), which will be the largest hospital in the state. The unit will be built within the Itaperi campus and will be deeply integrated with the university, whether in physical, urban or academic aspects. Nevertheless, the university also has the largest veterinary hospital in the North Northeast located on the Itaperi campus and linked to the Faculty of Veterinary Medicine (Favet).

According to the 2019 Folha de S.Paulo University Ranking (RUF), it is considered the 9th best state university in Brazil, and the best state university in the North, Northeast and Midwest regions. By this same ranking, it is the 55th best Brazilian university. In 2013, it was the state's top-rated higher education institution in the National Student Performance Exam (Enade). In addition, the courses of Administration, Psychology and Business Administration were among the best in the country. In 2021 the Times Higher Education (THE) published The Impact Rankings 2021 and the Latin America University Rankings 2021, which place Uece 92nd in the world and 4th in Brazil in "Quality Education" and one of the best universities in Latin America and the Caribbean. It is also the only Brazilian university cited in the Bright Green Book, the 21st Century Green Book, a partnership between the Euro-Brazilian Council for Sustainable Development (EUBRA) and UN-Habitat, the urban settlements program of the United Nations.

It has ten campuses, two of them in Fortaleza (the main campus is called Campus do Itaperi). The other campuses are in the cities of Quixadá, Itapipoca, Quixeramobim, Canindé, Aracati, Crateús, Limoeiro do Norte, Mombaça, Iguatu, Tauá, Guaiúba, and Pacoti.

== Undergraduate programs ==
Biological Sciences

- Physical Education
- Biology
- Nursing
- Medicine
- Veterinary Medicine
- Occupational Therapy
- Nutrition

Exact Sciences

- Computer Science
- Physics
- Mathematics
- Chemistry
- Accounting
- Management
- Information Systems

Humanities

- Social Sciences
- Business administration
- Philosophy
- Geography
- History
- Linguistics (literature·grammar)
  - Portuguese
  - English
  - Spanish
  - French
- Music
- Pedagogy
- Psychology
- Social work
- Visual Arts

== Organization ==
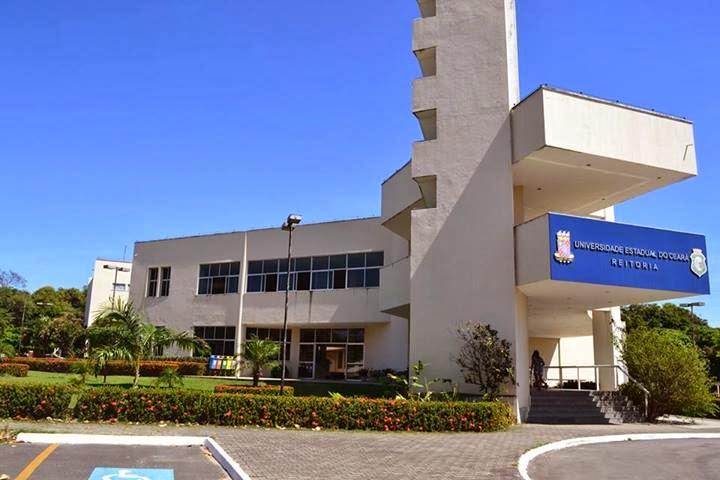
Rectory of the State University of Ceará

=== Centers, Schools and Institutes ===
Center for Humanities (CH)
Center for Education (CED)
Center for Applied Social Studies (CESA)
Center for Health Sciences (CCS)
Center for Science and Technology (CCT)
School of Veterinary Medicine (FAVET)
Don Aureliano Matos School of Philosophy (FAFIDAM)
Education School of Itapipoca (FACEDI)
Education School of Crateús (FAEC)
Education, Science, and Letters School of Central Sertão (FECLESC)
Education, Science, and Letters School of Iguatu (FECLI)

Mombaça Advanced Campus (FECLI/MOMBAÇA)
Education, Science, and Letters School of Inhamuns (CECITEC)

Health Sciences School of the Central Sertão (FACISC)

Education and Integrated Sciences School of Canindé (FECISC)

Education and Integrated Sciences School of the Eastern Coast (FECILL)
Institute of Biomedical Sciences

=== Postgraduate Courses ===
Doctorates/PhD:

- Administration (PPGA)
- Biotechnology (RENORBIO)
- Biotechnology in Human and Animal Health (PPGBiotec)
- Computer Science (PPGCC)
- Physiological Sciences (PPGCF)
- Natural Sciences (PPGCN)
- Veterinary Sciences (PPGCV)
- Education (PPGE)
- Geography (PROPGEO)
- Clinical Care in Nursing and Health (PPCCLIS)
- Applied Linguistics (POSLA)
- Public Policies (PPGPP)
- Collective Health (PPSAC)
- Family Health (RENASF)
- Sociology (PPGS)

Academic Masters:

- Administration (PPGA)
- Computer Science (PPGCC)
- Applied Physical Sciences (MACFA)
- Physiological Sciences (PPGCF)
- Natural Sciences (PPGCN)
- Veterinary Sciences (PPGCV)
- Clinical Care in Nursing and Health (PPCCLIS)
- Education (PPGE)
- Education and Teaching (MAIE)
- Philosophy (CMAF)
- Geography (PROPGEO)
- History (MAHIS)
- History and Letters (MIHL)
- Applied Linguistics (POSLA)
- Nutrition and Health (CMANS)
- Public Health (CMASP)
- Social Work, Work and Social Matters (MASS)
- Sociology (PPGS)

=== Deans ===
Dean of Undergraduate (PROGRAD)
Dean of Graduate Studies and Research (PROPGPQ)
Dean of Science Outreach (PROEX)
Dean of Student Policies (PRAE)
Dean of Management (PROAD)
Dean of Planning (PROPLAN)

=== Councils ===
Board of Directors (CD)
University Council (CONSU)
Council of Teaching, Research and Science Outreach (CEPE)

=== Libraries ===
Prof. Antônio Martins Filho Library
Center of Humanities Library
Prof. Paulo de Melo Petrola Library
Canon Misael Alves de Sousa Library
Education School of Crateús Library
Raquel de Queiroz Library
Humberto Teixeira Library
Education, Science and Letters School of Inhamuns Library

=== Other facilities ===
University Restaurant (RU)
UECE Publisher (EdUECE)
Executive Committee of Admission (CEV)

== See also ==
- List of state universities in Brazil
