= Jardim, Ceará =

Municipality in Ceará, Brazil

Coordinates: 7°34′55″S 39°17′52″W

Jardim
- Municipality
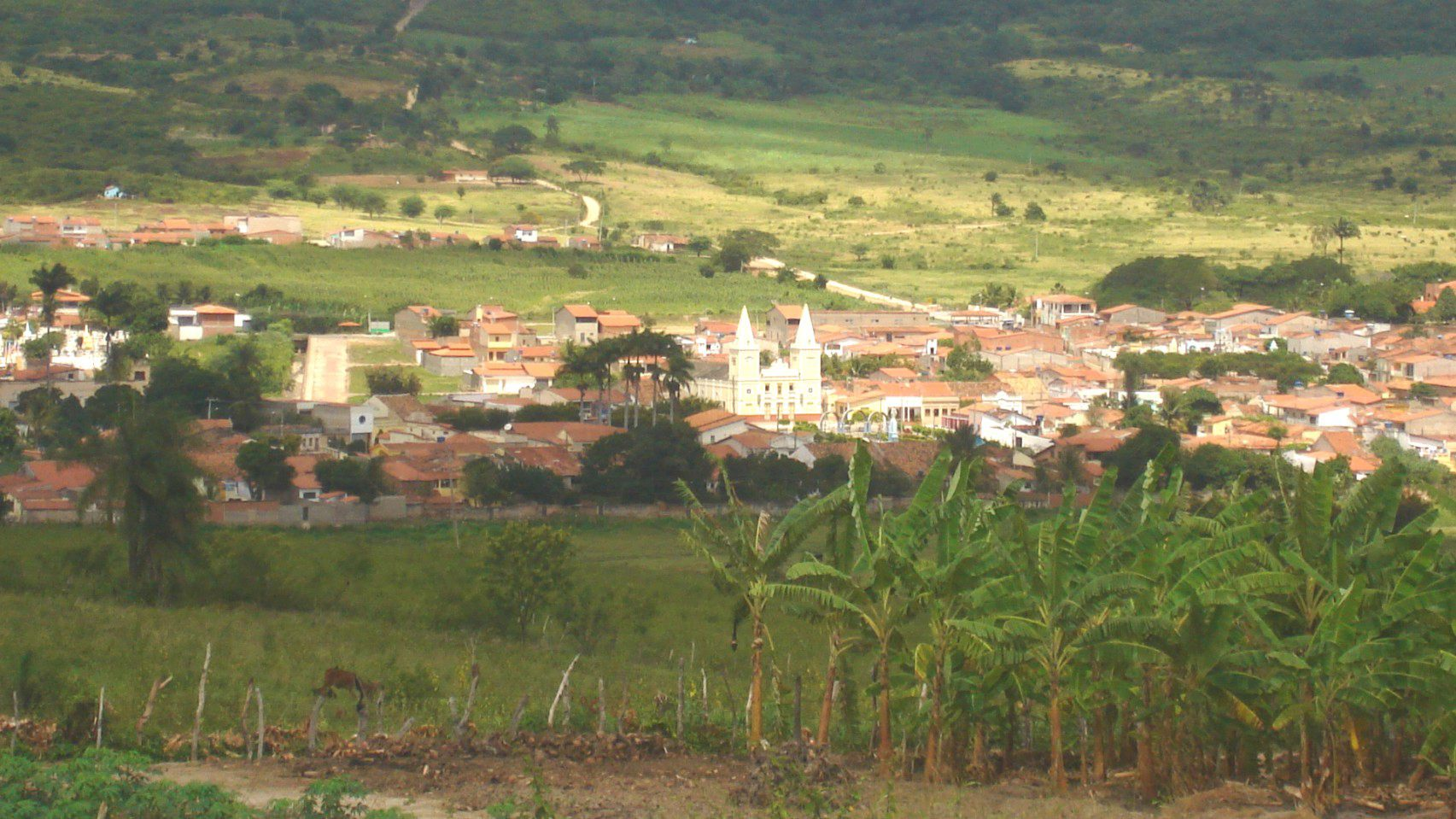

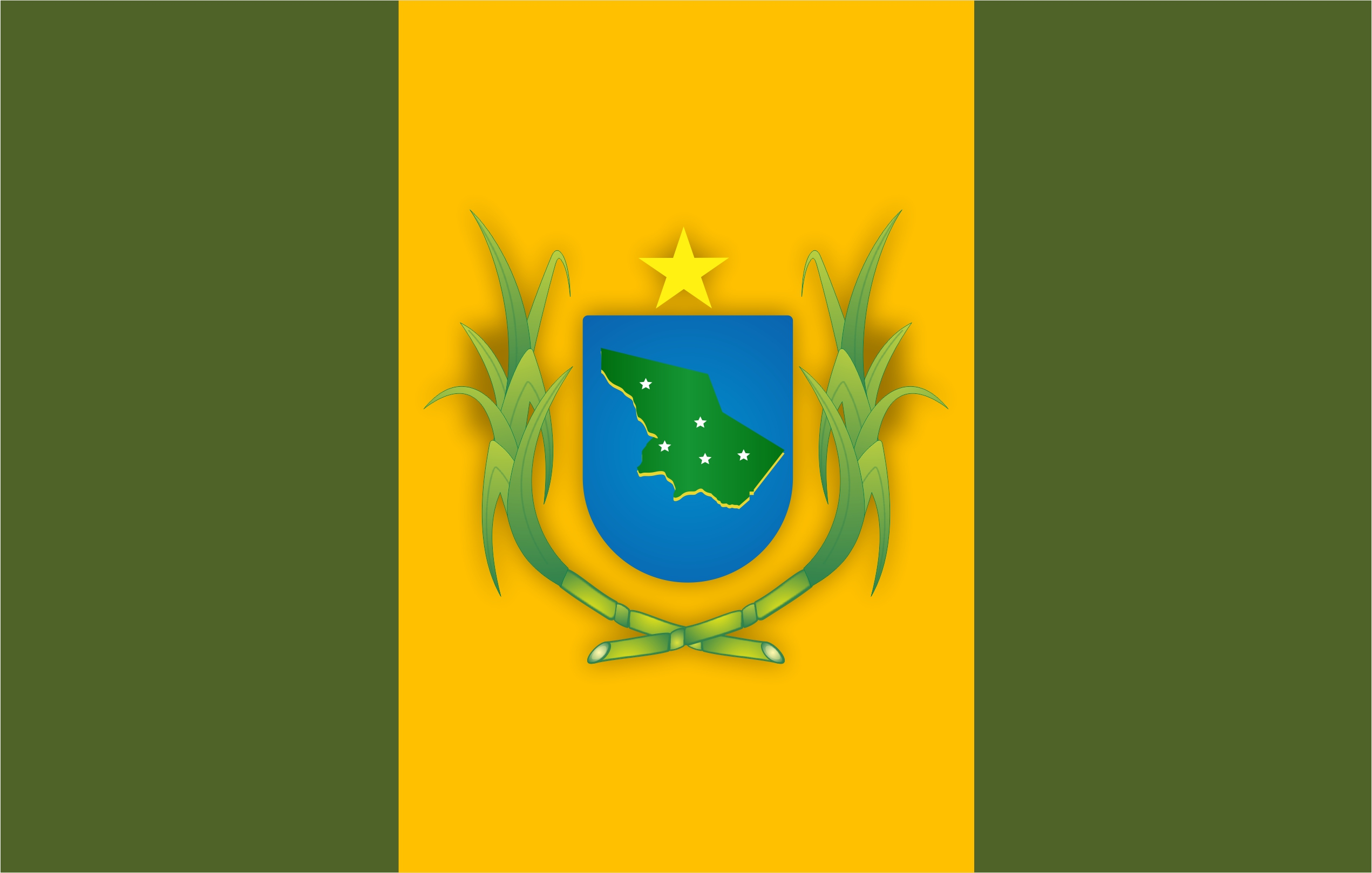
- Flag Coat of arms
- Interactive map of Jardim
- Country: Brazil
- Region: Nordeste
- State: Ceará
- Mesoregion: Sul Cearense

Population (2020)
  - Total: 27,181
- Time zone: UTC−3 (BRT)

Jardim, Ceará is a municipality in the state of Ceará in the Northeast region of Brazil.

== See also ==
- List of municipalities in Ceará
