= Porteiras =

Municipality in Ceará, Brazil

Coordinates: 7.535°S 39.1178°W

- Municipality
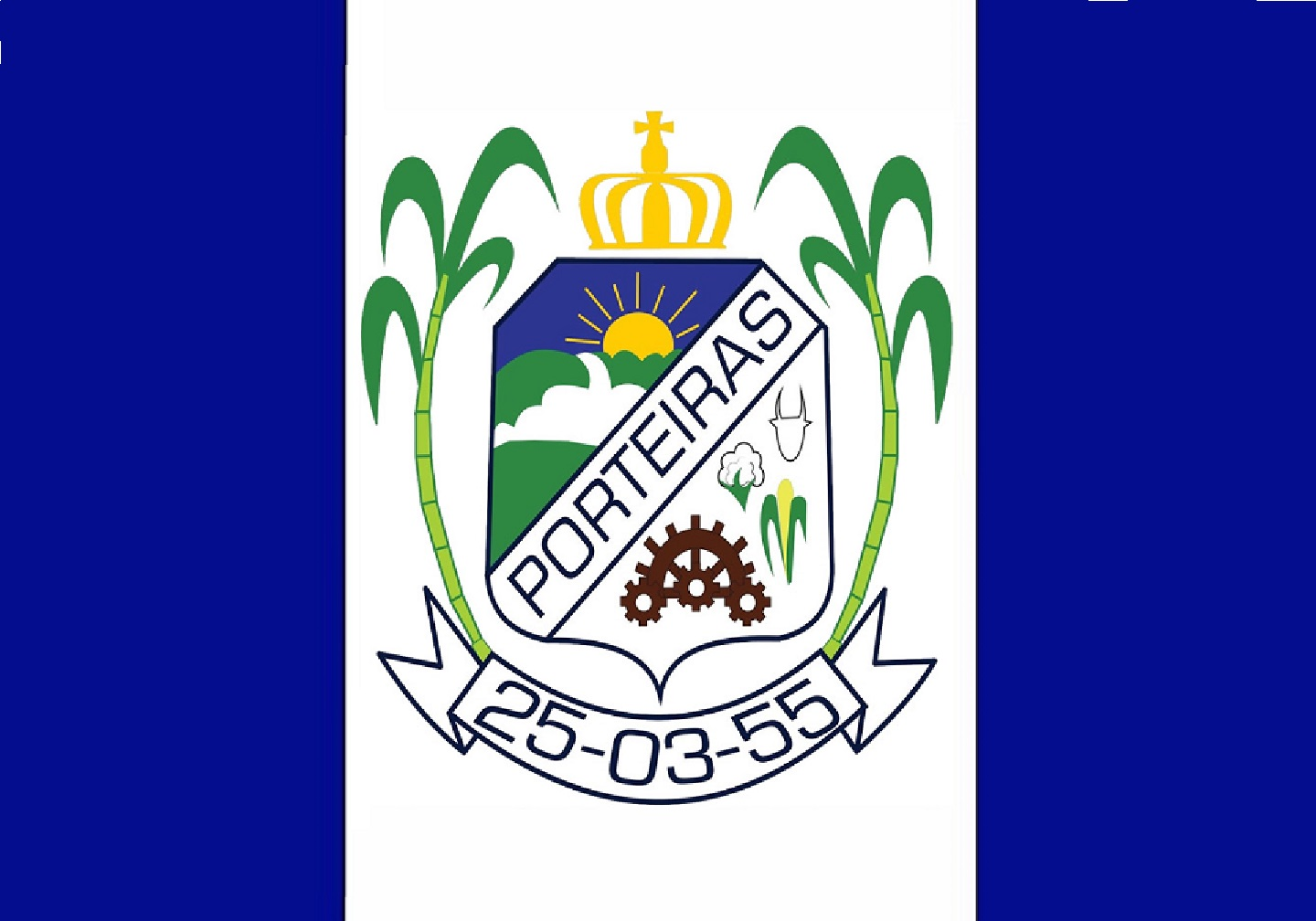
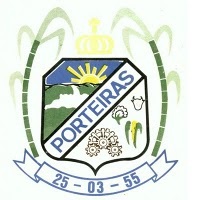
- Flag Coat of arms
- Interactive map of Porteiras
- Country: Brazil
- Region: Nordeste
- State: Ceará
- Mesoregion: Sul Cearense

Population (2020)
  - Total: 14,958
- Time zone: UTC−3 (BRT)

Porteiras is a municipality in the state of Ceará in the Northeast region of Brazil.

== See also ==
- List of municipalities in Ceará
