= Ubirajara jubatus =

Informal species of theropod

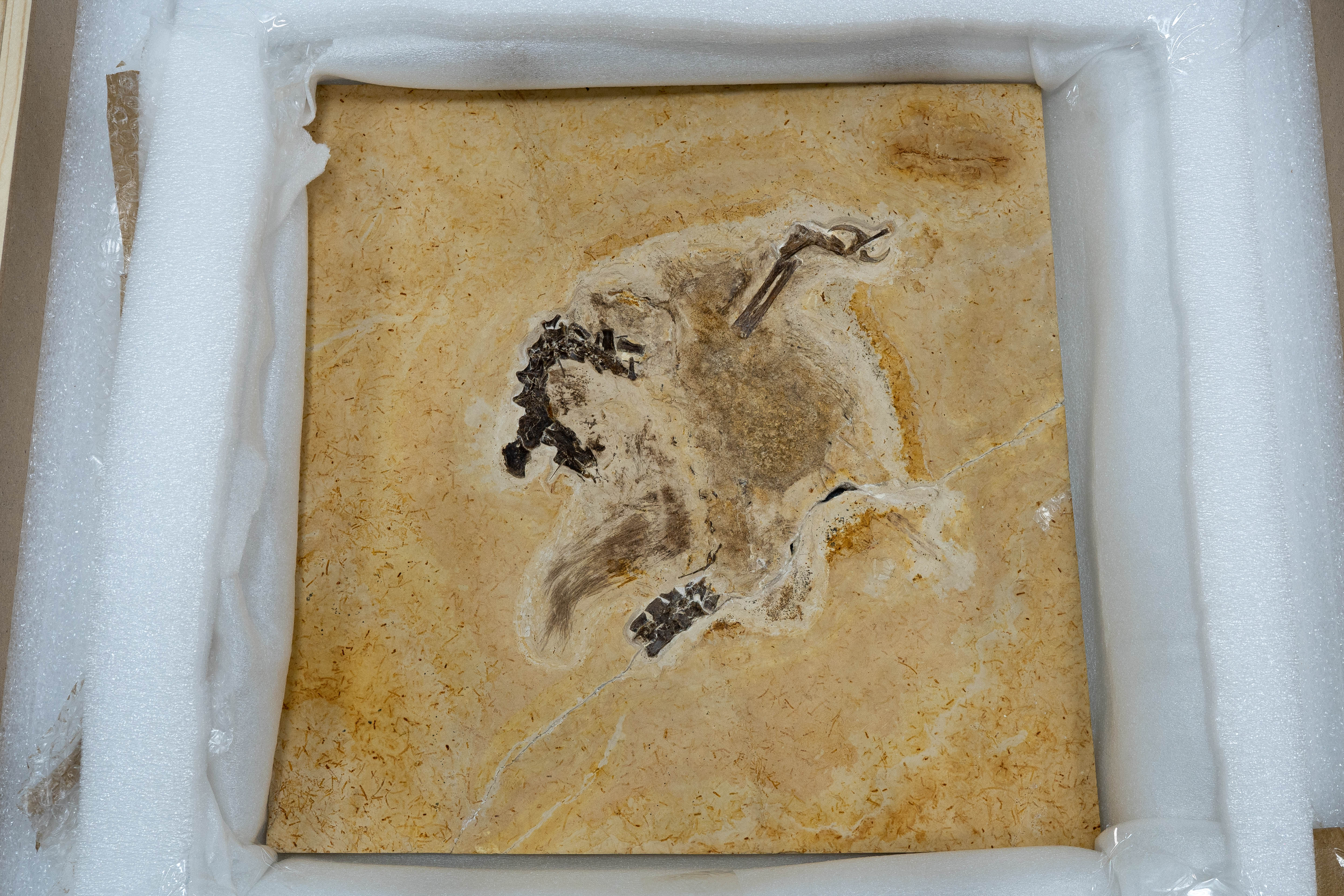
Proposed holotype specimen

"Ubirajara" ("lord of the spear") is an informal genus of compsognathid theropod dinosaur that lived during the early Cretaceous period in what is now Brazil. The manuscript describing it was available online pre-publication but was never formally published and, as a consequence, both genus and species name are considered invalid and unavailable. It is known by a single species, "Ubirajara jubatus", recovered from the Crato Formation. It was described as the first Gondwanan non-avian theropod dinosaur discovered with preserved integumentary structures. Such proto-feathers, most likely used for display, include slender monofilaments associated with the base of the neck, increasing in length along the dorsal thoracic region, where they would form a mane, as well as a pair of elongate, ribbon-like structures likely emerging from its shoulders. The taxon was informally named in 2020 in a now-withdrawn in-press academic paper. The description caused controversy due to the fossil having been apparently illegally smuggled from Brazil. In June 2023, Germany returned the fossil to Brazil after a legitimate export permit could not be found. The name "Ubirajara jubatus" was removed from ZooBank in November 2022, which means it no longer has any nomenclatural significance. The case has been labeled as an instance of scientific colonialism.

== History of discovery ==
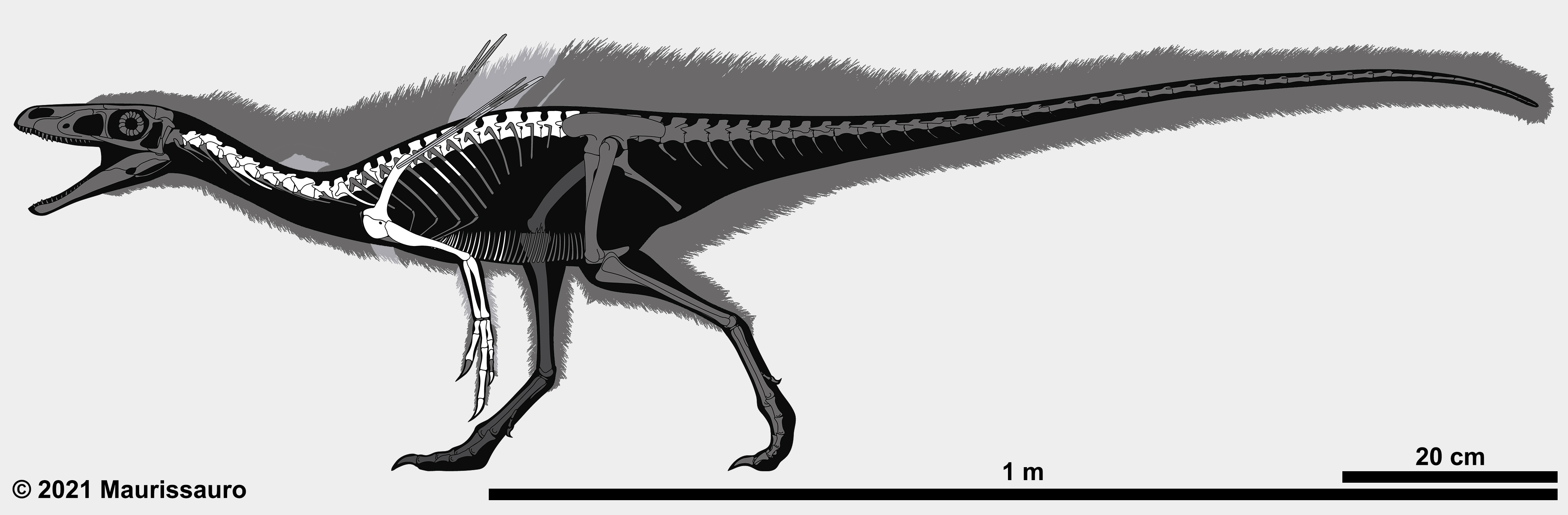
Skeletal reconstruction showing known elements

Workers recovered a number of fossils from a chalk quarry located between Nova Olinda and Santana do Cariri. One of the recovered pieces was a chalk plate that had already been split by the workers. Further preparation by a sharp steel pin and X-ray photography revealed the presence of a small theropod skeleton. The specimen, SMNK PAL 29241, was discovered in a layer of the Crato Formation, dating from the Aptian, about 115 million years old. It consists of a partial skeleton lacking the skull, preserved on a slab and counterslab. It consists of nine neck vertebrae, thirteen back vertebrae, two sacral vertebrae, the shoulder girdle, one neck rib, seven dorsal ribs, fifteen belly ribs and the almost complete left arm. Apart from the bones, the fossil also preserves remains of the plumage, skin, granulate structures in the torso, and the keratin sheaths of the hand claws. The skeleton is partially articulated. It represents a juvenile, and possibly male, individual.

=== Legal issues ===
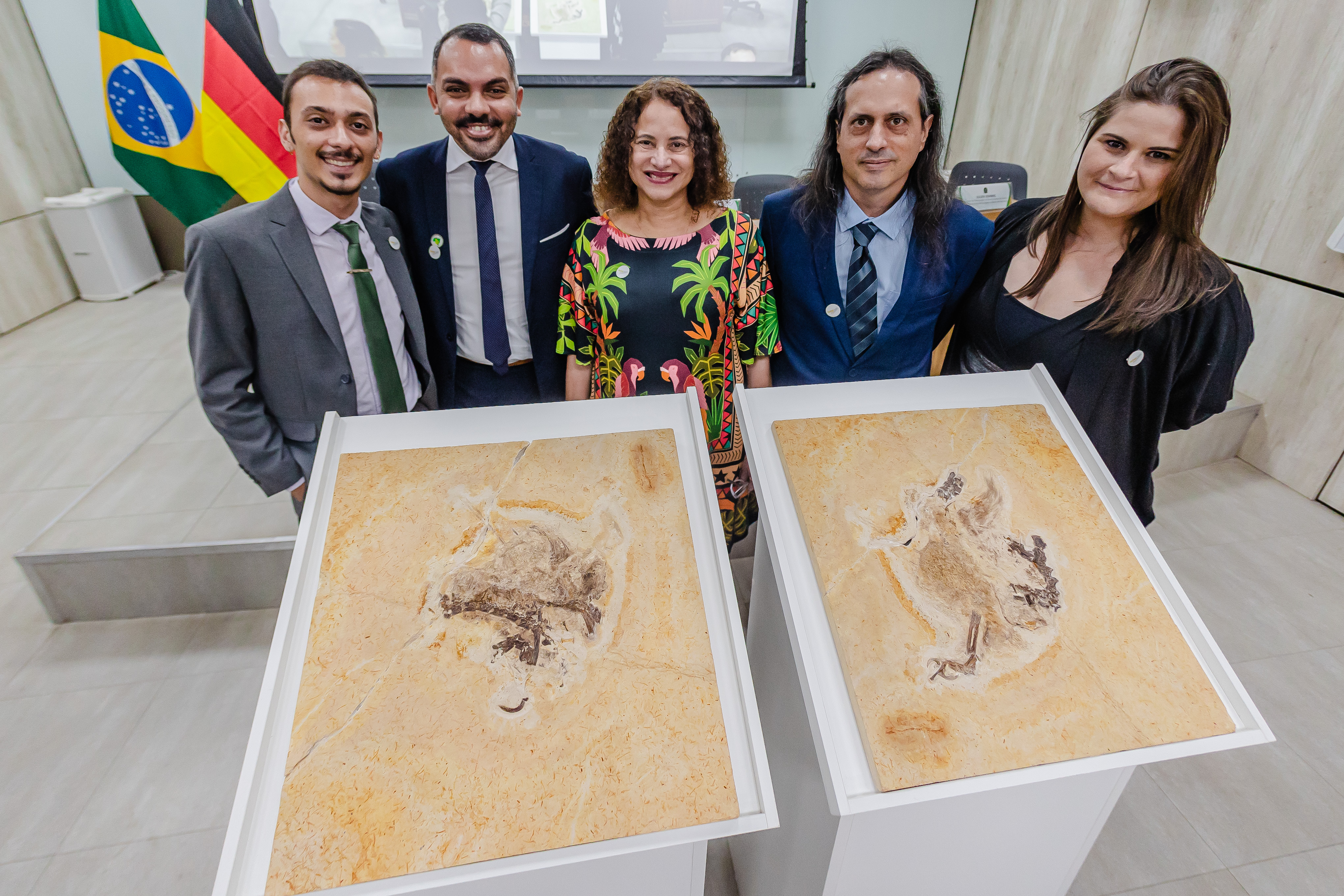
Officials with the specimen's slab and counterslab during a ceremony after its return to Brazil in 2023

The authors of the 2020 study claimed that the fossil had been acquired by the State Museum of Natural History Karlsruhe (SMNK) in 1995, following an export from Brazil with the necessary documentation. This led to a considerable backlash as researchers from Brazil disputed this claim. They argued that Brazilian law does not allow the removal of fossils from its territory, nor for studies on them to be conducted without the participation of local scientists or institutions. As a result, Brazilian scientists campaigned for the repatriation of the fossil. This campaign relied heavily on social media and mobilised a large number of supporters under the hashtag #UbirajaraBelongstoBR.

Due to the ethical issues involving the potentially illegal transfer of the fossil from Brazil to Germany, the paper describing the specimen was "temporarily removed" only a few days after being made available online "in press" prior to formal publication. The article was later withdrawn in September 2021.

These events prompted an investigation into the provenance of the specimen. In 2021, a spokesperson for the Ministry of Science, Research and Culture of Baden-Württemberg confirmed that the fossil had, in fact, been removed from Brazil in 2006 and acquired by the SMNK in 2009. The investigation also failed to retrieve legitimate permits for the export of the specimens from Brazil. A legal analysis, published in the International Journal of Cultural Property, later confirmed the doubts concerning the legality of the specimen, concluding that the Brazilian state was the legal owner of the specimen, that the SMNK had not acquired good title to it, and that as a result, Brazil would be entitled to a civil action of restitution pursuant to Article 985 of the German Civil Code.

Accordingly, State Minister for Science, Research and Culture Theresia Bauer made an announcement in July 2022 that the fossil of "Ubirajara jubatus" would be returned to Brazil. During a ceremony on 12 June 2023, the specimen was officially repatriated by a German delegation headed by German Foreign Minister Annalena Baerbock. It is now on display at the Plácido Cidade Nuvens Paleontology Museum which is associated with the Regional University of Cariri (Urca).

=== Nomenclatural issues ===
The genus name "Ubirajara" was erected by Robert S. H. Smyth, David Michael Martill, Eberhard Frey, Hector Eduardo Rivera-Silva and Norbert Lenz in December 2020. The generic name means "Lord of the Spear" in the local Tupi language, in reference to the elongate shoulder filaments. The informal specific name, "jubatus", means "maned" in Latin, referring to the preserved integument on its back.

The "temporary removal" and ultimately the retraction of the publication describing the new genus and species, however, raise questions as to the nomenclatural validity of the new taxon. On 18 November 2022, the records of the names "Ubirajara jubatus", as well as their publication records, were removed from ZooBank, and a 2023 review noted that "Ubirajara jubatus" is an unavailable name with no nomenclatural significance, but not specifically a nomen nudum. The authors of the review note also noted that the phylogenetic matrix containing the specimen has never been made available, raising doubts about the claimed affinities of the specimens.

== Description ==
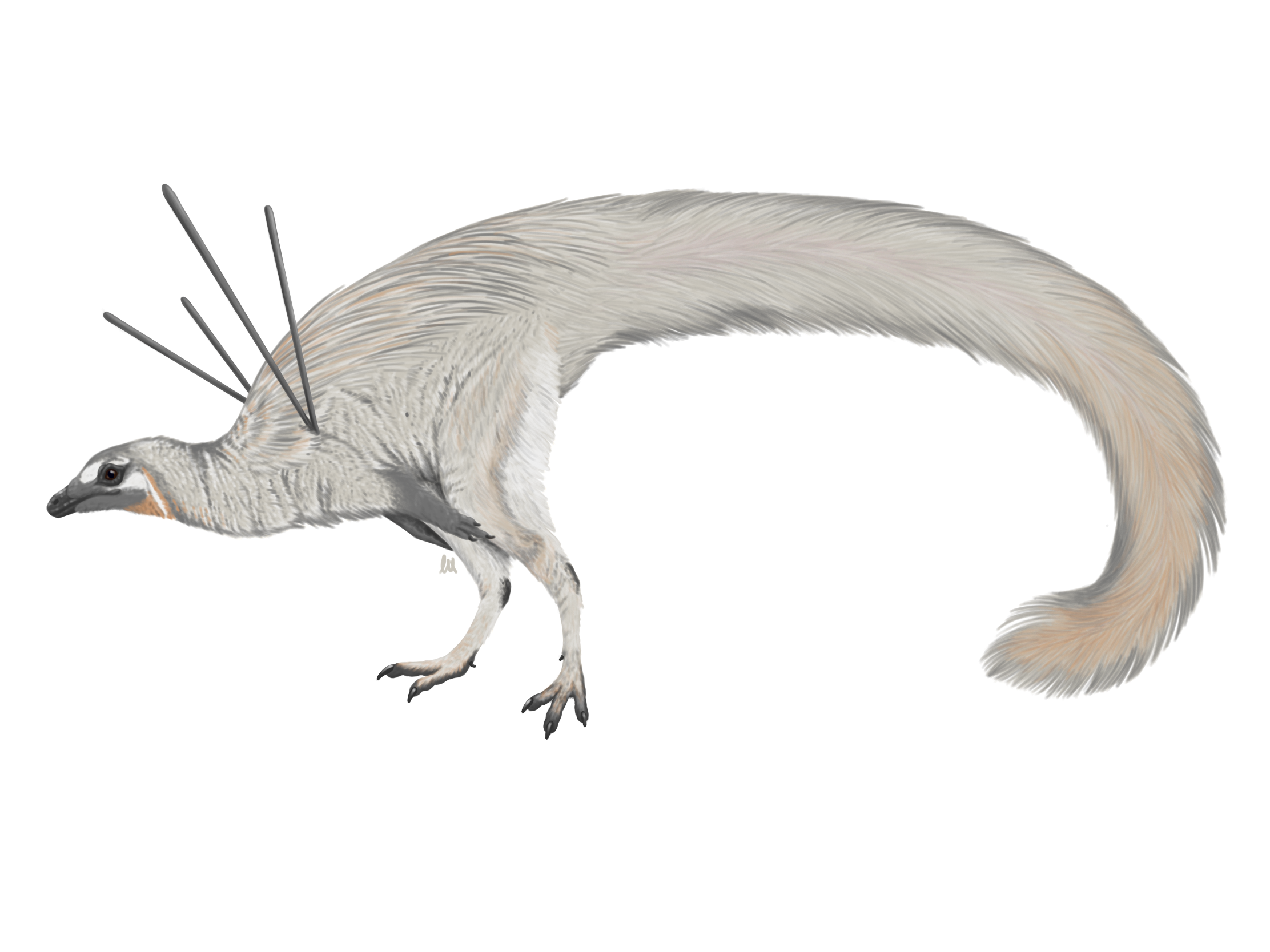
Life restoration

In life, the fossil individual would have been approximately 1 metre (3.3 ft) long.

== Phylogeny ==
The specimen was placed in the Compsognathidae family in 2020, as the sister species of a clade formed by Sinosauropteryx and Compsognathus. This phylogeny was criticized since it cannot be properly scientifically tested or replicated at the moment because the data supporting it were never made available.

== See also ==
- List of informally named dinosaurs
- List of non-avian dinosaur species preserved with evidence of feathers
