= Campos Sales, Ceará =

Municipality in Ceará, Brazil

Coordinates: 7°04′26″S 40°22′33″W

Campos Sales
- Municipality
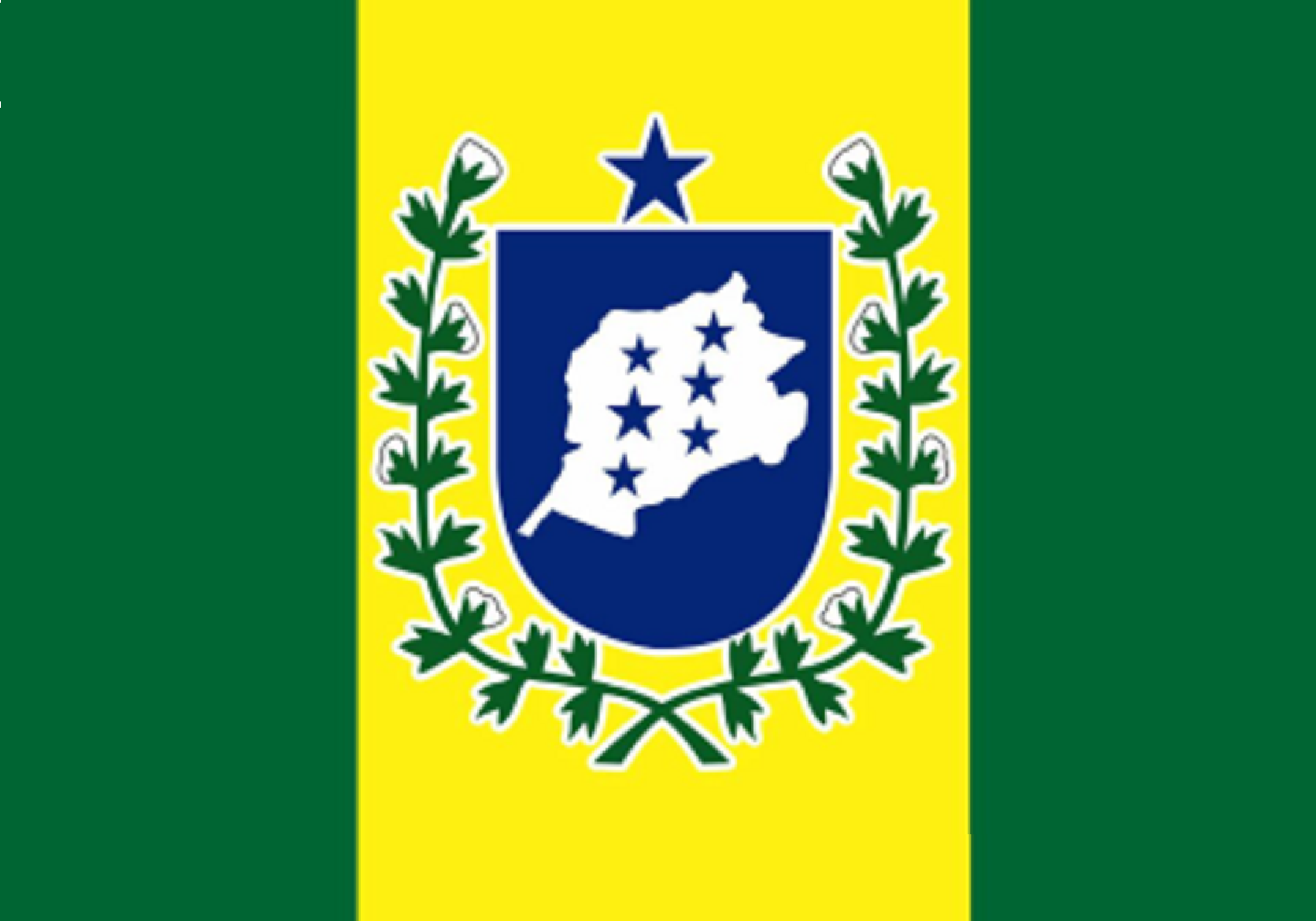
- Flag
- Interactive map of Campos Sales
- Country: Brazil
- Region: Nordeste
- State: Ceará
- Mesoregion: Sul Cearense

Population (2022)
  - Total: 25,135
- Time zone: UTC−3 (BRT)

Campos Sales, Ceará is a municipality in the state of Ceará in the Northeast region of Brazil.

== Climate ==
Climate data for Campos Sales (1981–2010)
Month	Jan	Feb	Mar	Apr	May	Jun	Jul	Aug	Sep	Oct	Nov	Dec	Year
Mean daily maximum °C (°F)	31.0 (87.8)	30.1 (86.2)	29.8 (85.6)	29.5 (85.1)	29.5 (85.1)	29.5 (85.1)	29.6 (85.3)	31.0 (87.8)	32.8 (91.0)	33.8 (92.8)	33.5 (92.3)	32.6 (90.7)	31.1 (88.0)
Daily mean °C (°F)	25.4 (77.7)	24.6 (76.3)	24.2 (75.6)	24.0 (75.2)	23.7 (74.7)	23.3 (73.9)	23.4 (74.1)	24.4 (75.9)	26.0 (78.8)	27.2 (81.0)	27.3 (81.1)	26.7 (80.1)	25.0 (77.0)
Mean daily minimum °C (°F)	20.9 (69.6)	20.4 (68.7)	20.2 (68.4)	19.9 (67.8)	19.2 (66.6)	18.6 (65.5)	18.6 (65.5)	18.8 (65.8)	19.9 (67.8)	21.2 (70.2)	21.6 (70.9)	21.5 (70.7)	20.1 (68.2)
Average precipitation mm (inches)	99.0 (3.90)	111.7 (4.40)	137.6 (5.42)	109.4 (4.31)	35.0 (1.38)	4.8 (0.19)	5.4 (0.21)	0.9 (0.04)	2.1 (0.08)	10.3 (0.41)	19.8 (0.78)	63.1 (2.48)	599.1 (23.59)
Average precipitation days (≥ 1.0 mm)	8	9	12	10	5	1	1	0	1	1	2	5	55
Average relative humidity (%)	68.1	75.7	79.5	80.1	72.9	65.6	60.1	53.1	46.4	45.6	50.4	56.6	62.8
Mean monthly sunshine hours	190.8	162.0	182.2	192.2	230.3	248.4	268.1	291.4	278.7	270.5	251.6	222.4	2,788.6
Source: Instituto Nacional de Meteorologia

== Transportation ==
Campos Sales is served by Campos Sales Regional Airport

== See also ==
- List of municipalities in Ceará
