= State Museum of Natural History Karlsruhe =

Natural history museum in Karlsruhe, Germany

- Staatliches Museum für Naturkunde Karlsruhe
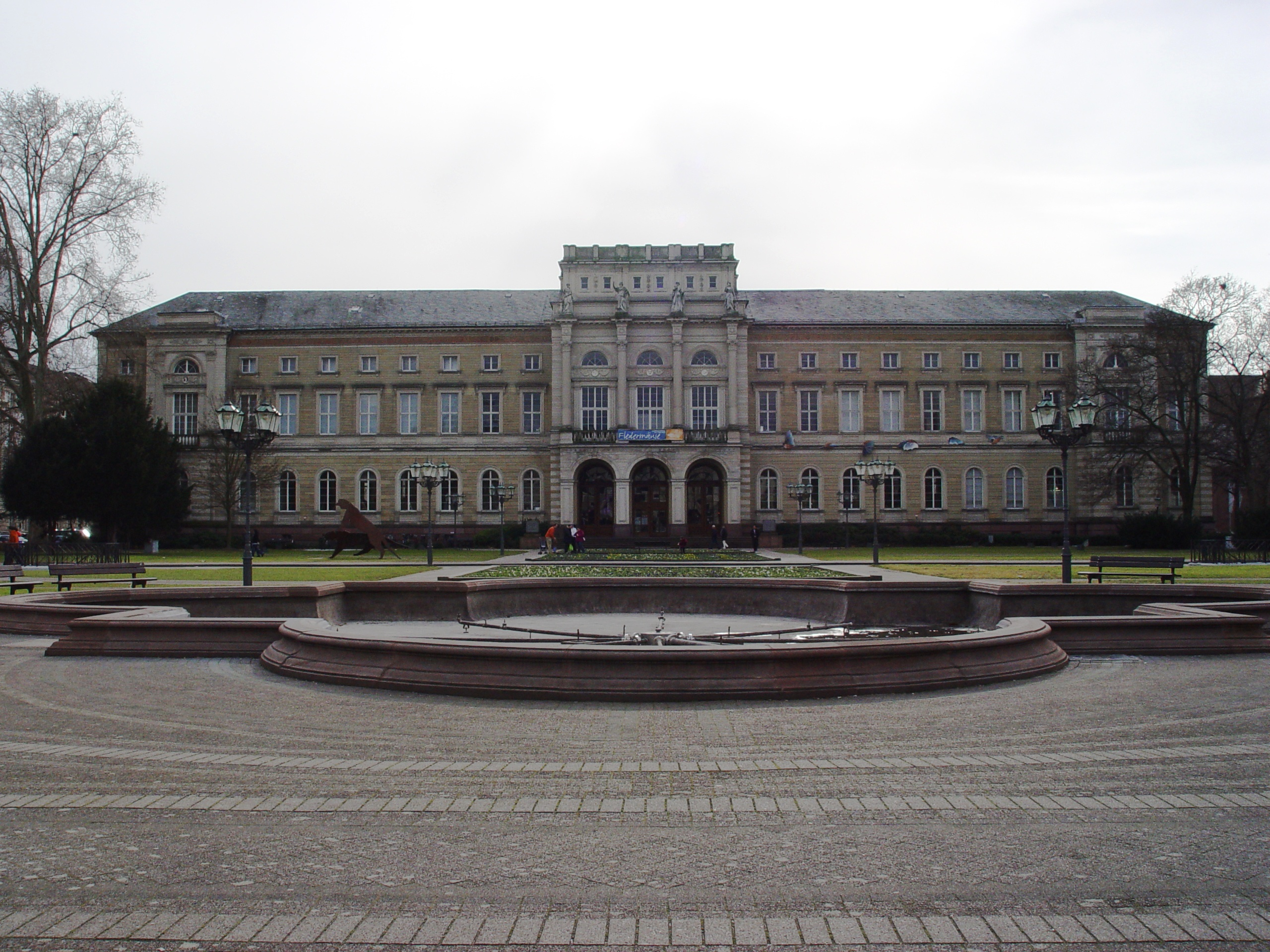
- Location: Karlsruhe, Baden-Württemberg, Germany
- Coordinates: 49°00′26″N 8°24′01″E
- Type: Natural history museum
- Website: www.smnk.de/en/

The State Museum of Natural History Karlsruhe (German: Staatliches Museum für Naturkunde Karlsruhe), abbreviated SMNK, is one of the two state of Baden-Württemberg's natural history museums. Together with the State Museum of Natural History Stuttgart (Staatliches Museum für Naturkunde Stuttgart) it is one of the most important repositories for state-owned natural history collections.

It is well known for its exhibitions on all aspects of natural history in the city of Karlsruhe and beyond. Every year, the SMNK is visited by about 150,000 people.

Research at the museum mainly deals with various fields of natural history i.e. geology, paleontology, taxonomy, biogeography, and ecology. The SMNK is part of the national networks German Natural History Research Collections (DNFS), the Humboldt-Ring (Association of Research Museums) and of the International Council of Museums (ICOM).

The SMNK looks back at a long history as it emerged from the cabinet of natural history of Landgravine Caroline Louise of Hesse-Darmstadt during the mid 18th century.

== Controversy ==
The museum has been criticized for unethical and possibly illegal appropriation of fossils. The fossil that has been informally named "Ubirajara jubatus", an unusual dinosaur from the Cretaceous period with structures that might be early feathers, was found in 1990 in Brazil by a team of paleontologists. It was exported from the country 1995 with a permit for unspecified fossil specimens (making it impossible to directly link it to the "Ubirajara" fossil) from Brazilian authorities. However, Brazilian law does not allow permanent exports of fossils, only loans. As a consequence, the paper describing the fossil was temporarily removed. The fossil was returned to Brazil in 2023. Other Brazilian fossils in the museum, notably Unwindia and Susisuchus, faced similar ethical concerns.

== See also ==
- List of museums in Germany
- List of natural history museums
