= Missão Velha =

Municipality in Ceará, Brazil

Coordinates: 7.25°S 39.1428°W

- Municipality
- Interactive map of Missão Velha
- Country: Brazil
- Region: Nordeste
- State: Ceará
- Mesoregion: Sul Cearense

Government
  - Mayor: Tardiny Pinheiro Roberto (PT)

Population (2020)
  - Total: 35,480
- Time zone: UTC−3 (BRT)

Missão Velha is a municipality in the state of Ceará in the Northeast region of Brazil.

== See also ==
- List of municipalities in Ceará
