= Cumbuco =

- Beach

- Location on the Brazilian coast
- Coordinates: 3°37′40″S 38°43′40″W
- Country: Brazil
- Region: Northeast
- State: Ceará
- Municipality: Caucaia

Area
  - Land: 1.6 km^{2} (0.62 sq mi)

Population
  - Total: 1,600
- Time zone: UTC-3 (UTC-3)

Cumbuco is a small fishing village situated about 25 kilometres (16 mi) North West from the city of Fortaleza, in the state of Ceará, along the north east coast of Brazil. The population is around 1600. The village is regarded as picturesque and scenic and is attracting both domestic and international tourism.

Cumbuco has a beach near Fortaleza on one side of town and sand dunes on the other. VG sun cumbuco is located in beachside, There is a small and busy village centre built around the main square adjacent to the beach which has a fish market, tropical palm trees, and several beach restaurants (barracas).

Facing onto the Atlantic Ocean, Cumbuco is popular for kitesurfing and windsurfing, with mild air and ocean temperatures and strong and consistent South East trade winds from July to January. Sand dunes behind the village also create a thermal effect that boost the wind speed.

There are more than 300 km of beaches in the State of Ceará, which are popular for practicing downwind trips and kite safaris.
