= Ceará =

State of Brazil

- State
- Flag Coat of arms
- Motto: Terra da Luz (Portuguese) "Land of Light"
- Anthem: Hino do Ceará
- Location in Brazil
- Coordinates: 5.08°S 39.65°W
- Country: Brazil
- Region: Northeast
- Capital and largest city: Fortaleza

Government
  - Type: Unitary state
  - Governor: Elmano de Freitas (PT)
  - Vice Governor: Jade Romero (PT)
  - Senators: Camilo Santana (PT); Cid Gomes (PSB); Eduardo Girão (NOVO)
  - Legislature: Legislative Assembly of Ceará

Area
  - Total: 146,348.3 km^{2} (56,505.4 sq mi)
  - Rank: 17th

Population (2022)
  - Total: 8,794,957
  - Rank: 8th
  - Density: 60.09607/km^{2} (155.6481/sq mi)
  - Rank: 11th
- Demonym: Cearense

GDP (2024)
  - Total: R$257.249 billion (US$47.737 billion)

HDI
  - Year: 2024
  - Category: 0.773 – high (16th)
- Time zone: UTC-3 (BRT)
- Postal Code: 60000-000 to 63990-000
- ISO 3166 code: BR-CE
- Website: www.ceara.gov.br

Ceará (/ˌsɛɑːˈrɑː/, SEH-ah-RAH; Brazilian Portuguese: [seaˈɾa], locally [sjaˈɾa] or [si.aˈɾa]) is one of the 26 states of Brazil, located in the northeastern part of the country, on the Atlantic coast. It is the eighth-largest Brazilian State by population and the 17th by area. It is also one of the main tourist destinations in Brazil. The state capital is the city of Fortaleza, the country's fourth most populous city. The state has 4.3% of the Brazilian population and produces 2.1% of the Brazilian GDP. It is divided into 184 municipalities.

Literally, the name Ceará means "sings the jandaia". According to José de Alencar, one of the most important writers of Brazil and an authority in Tupi Guaraní, Ceará means turquoise or green waters.

The state is best known for its extensive coastline, with 600 kilometers (370 mi) of sand. There are also mountains and valleys producing tropical fruits. To the south, on the border of Paraíba, Pernambuco and Piauí, is the National Forest of Araripe.

== Geography ==
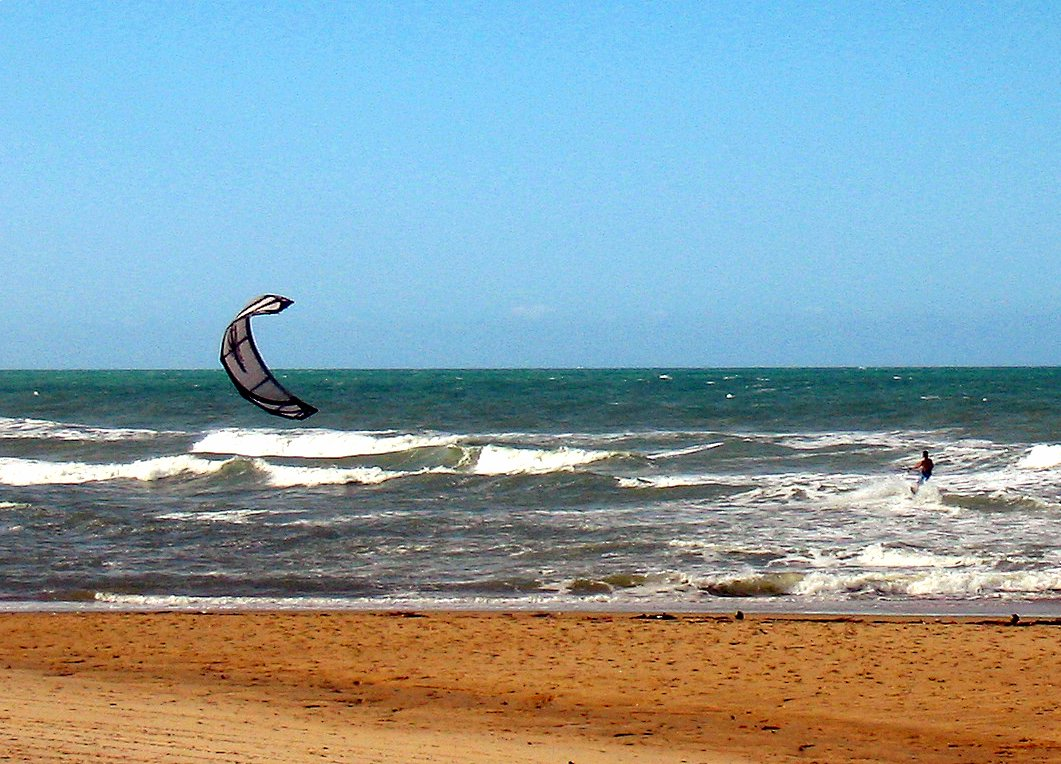
Kitesurf in Fortaleza

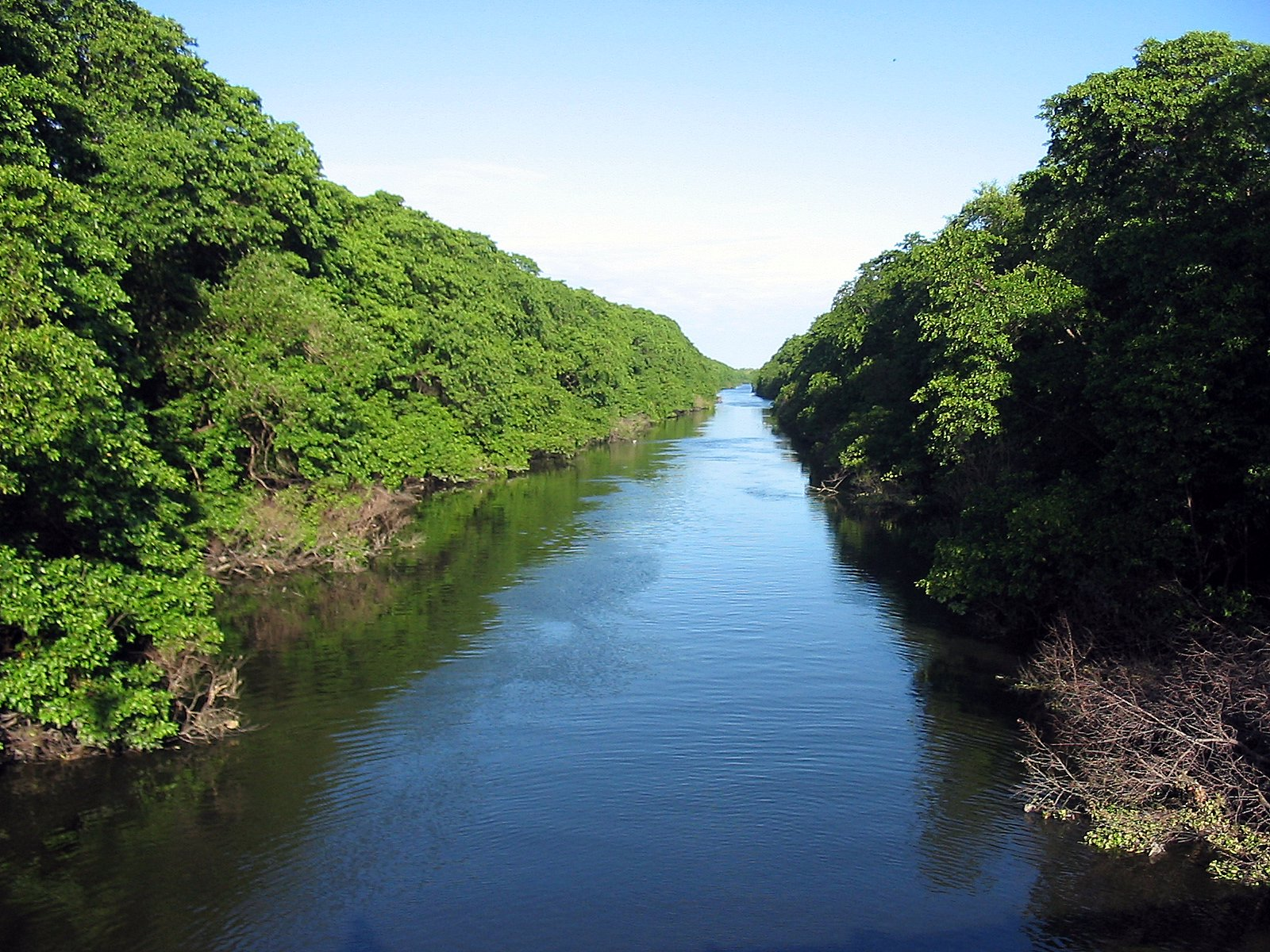
Cocó River

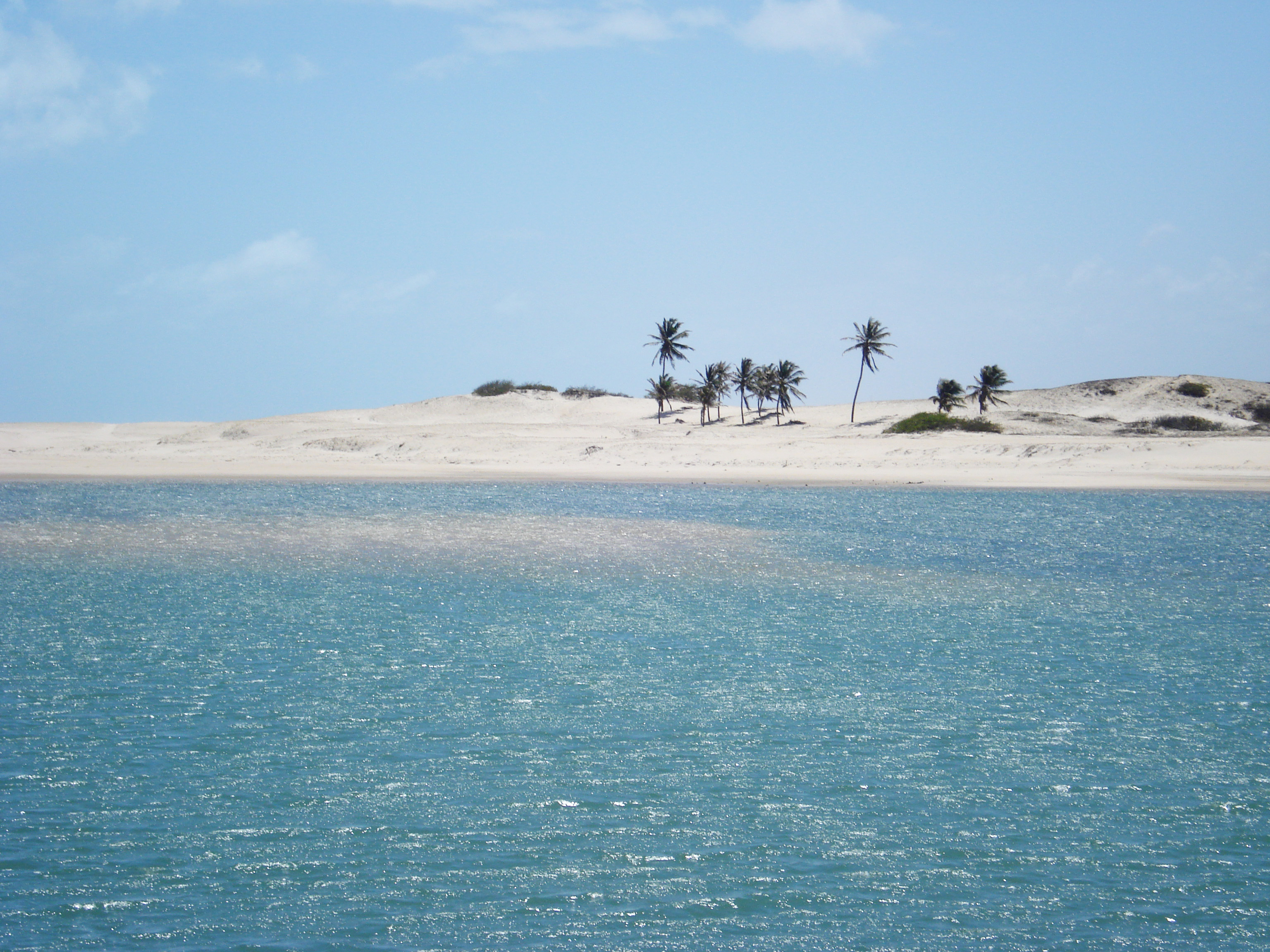
Aguas Belas beach, in Cascavel

Ceará has an area of 148,016 square kilometres (57,149 sq mi). It is bounded on the north by the Atlantic Ocean, on the east by the states of Rio Grande do Norte and Paraíba, on the south by Pernambuco state, and on the west by Piauí.

Ceará lies partly upon the northeast slope of the Brazilian Highlands, and partly upon the sandy coastal plain. Its surface is a succession of great terraces, facing north and northeast, formed by the denudation of the ancient sandstone plateau which once covered this part of the continent; the terraces are seamed by watercourses, and their valleys are broken by hills and ranges of highlands. The latter are the remains of the ancient plateau, capped with horizontal strata of sandstone, with a uniform altitude of 2,000 to 2,400 feet (610 to 730 m). The flat top of such a range is called a chapada or taboleira, and its width in places is from 32 to 56 miles (51 to 90 km). The boundary line with Piauí follows one of these ranges, the Serra de Ibiapaba, which unites with another range on the southern boundary of the state, known as the Serra do Araripe. Another range, or escarpment, crosses the state from east to west, but is broken into two principal divisions, each having several local names. These ranges are not continuous, the breaking down of the ancient plateau having been irregular and uneven.

The rivers of the state are small and, with one or two exceptions, become completely dry in the dry season. The largest is the Jaguaribe, which flows entirely across the state in a northeast direction.

Ceará has a varied environment, with mangroves, caatinga, jungle, scrubland and tropical forest. The higher ranges intercept considerable moisture from the prevailing trade winds, and their flanks and valleys are covered with a tropical forest which is typical of the region, gathering species from tropical forests, caatinga and cerrado. The less elevated areas of the plateaus are either thinly wooded or open campo. Most of the region at the lower altitudes is characterized by scrubby forests called caatingas, which is an endemic Brazilian vegetation. The sandy, coastal plain, with a width of 12 to 18 miles (19 to 29 km), is nearly bare of vegetation, although the coast has many enclaves of restingas (coastal forests) and mangroves.

The soil is, in general, thin and porous and does not retain moisture; consequently, the long dry season turns the country into a barren desert, relieved only by vegetation along the riverways and mountain ranges, and by the hardy, widely distributed carnauba palm (Copernicia cerifera), which in places forms groves of considerable extent. Some areas in the higher ranges of Serra da Ibiapaba, Serra do Araripe and others are more appropriate for agriculture, as their soil and vegetation are less affected by the dry seasons.

The beaches of the state are a major tourist attraction. Ceará has several famous beaches such as Canoa Quebrada, Jericoacoara, Morro Branco, Taíba and Flexeiras. The beaches are divided into two groups (in relation to the capital Fortaleza): Sunset Coast (Costa do Sol poente) and Sunrise Coast (Costa do Sol nascente).

Ceará lies in one of the few regions of the country that experiences earthquakes. In 1980 an earthquake measuring 5.8 on the Richter scale struck near Quixeramobim in the center of the state, rattling the city of Fortaleza but causing no injuries.

=== Climate ===
Climate types of Ceará

The climate of Ceará is hot almost all year. The temperature in the state varies from 22 to 36 °C (72 to 97 °F). The coast is hot and humid, tempered by the cool trade winds; in the more elevated, semi-arid regions it is very hot and dry (often above 22 °C (72 °F), but seldom above 30 °C (86 °F)), although the nights are cool. In the higher ranges (Serra da Ibiapaba, Chapada do Araripe and several smaller highlands) the temperatures are cooler and vary from about 14 to 18 °C (57 to 64 °F). The record minimum temperature registered in Ceará was 8 °C (46 °F), recorded in Jardim, a small city in Chapada do Araripe.

The year is divided into a rainy and dry season, the rains beginning in January to March and lasting until June. The dry season, July to December, is sometimes broken by slight showers in September and October, but these are of slight importance. Sometimes the rains fail altogether, and then a drought (seca) ensues, causing famine and pestilence throughout the entire region. The most destructive droughts recorded in the 18th and 19th centuries were those of 1711, 1723, 1777–1778, 1790, 1825, 1844–1845, and 1877–1880, the last-mentioned (known by local people as a Grande Seca, "the Great Drought") destroying nearly all the livestock in the state, and causing the death through starvation and pestilence of nearly half a million people, or over half the population. Because of the constant risk of droughts, many dams (called açudes) have been built throughout Ceará, the largest of them the Açude Castanhão. Because of the dams, the Jaguaribe River no longer dries up completely.

== Paleontology ==
The state contains outcrops of the Early Cretaceous Crato and Santana formations. In 2015, the earliest South American enantiornithine bird was described from the Aptian sediments of Crato Formation. The animal was named Cratoavis cearensis, after formation and state’s naming.

== History ==
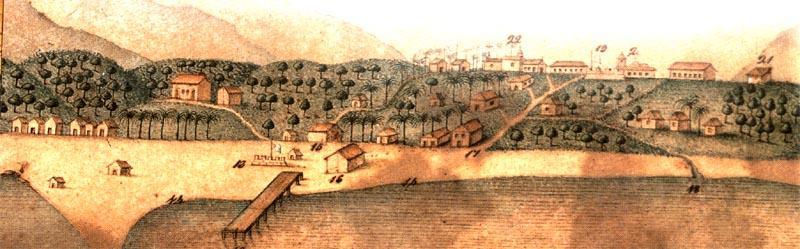
Panorama of Fortaleza in 1811

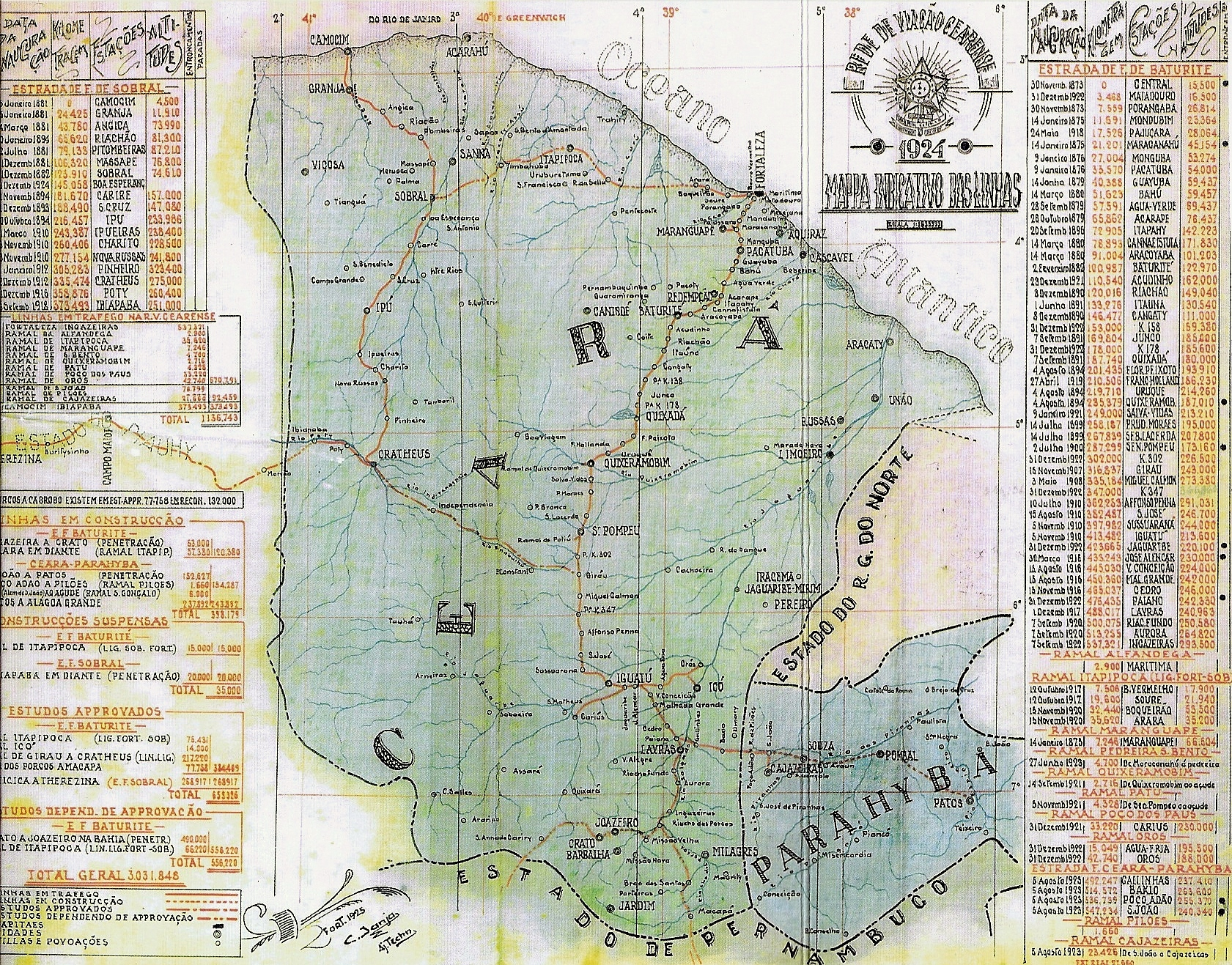
Map of Ceara State in 1924, (Portuguese edition)

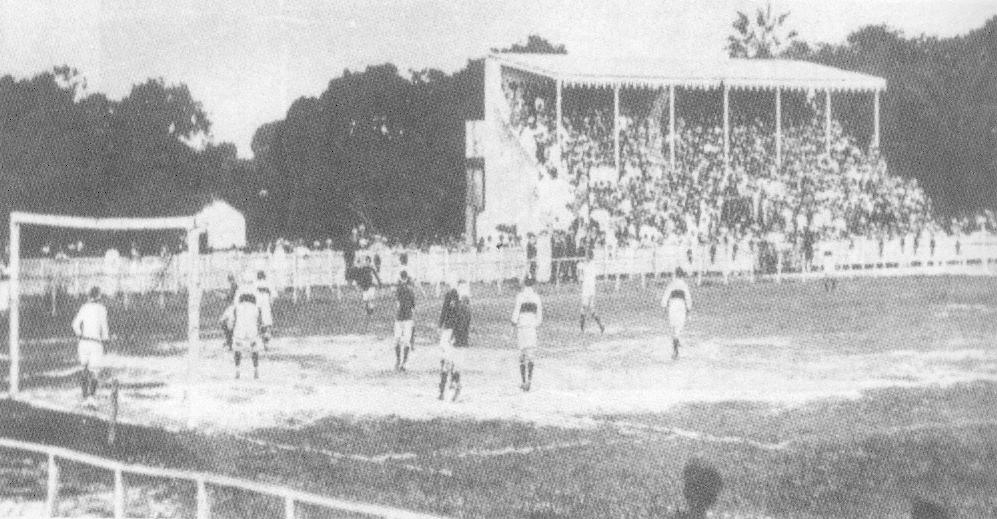
Campo do Prado in 1927

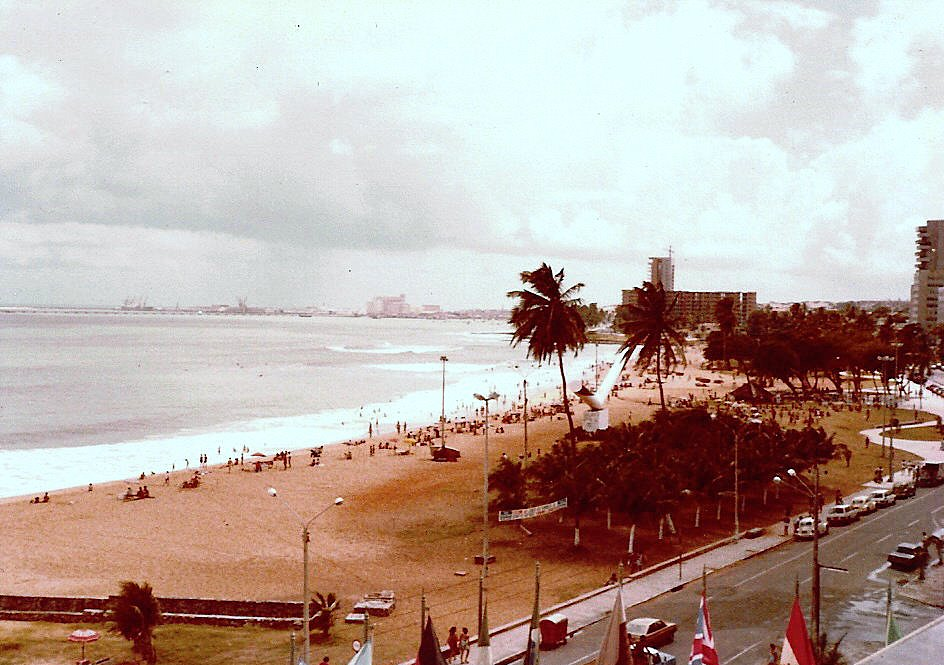
Fortaleza in 1980

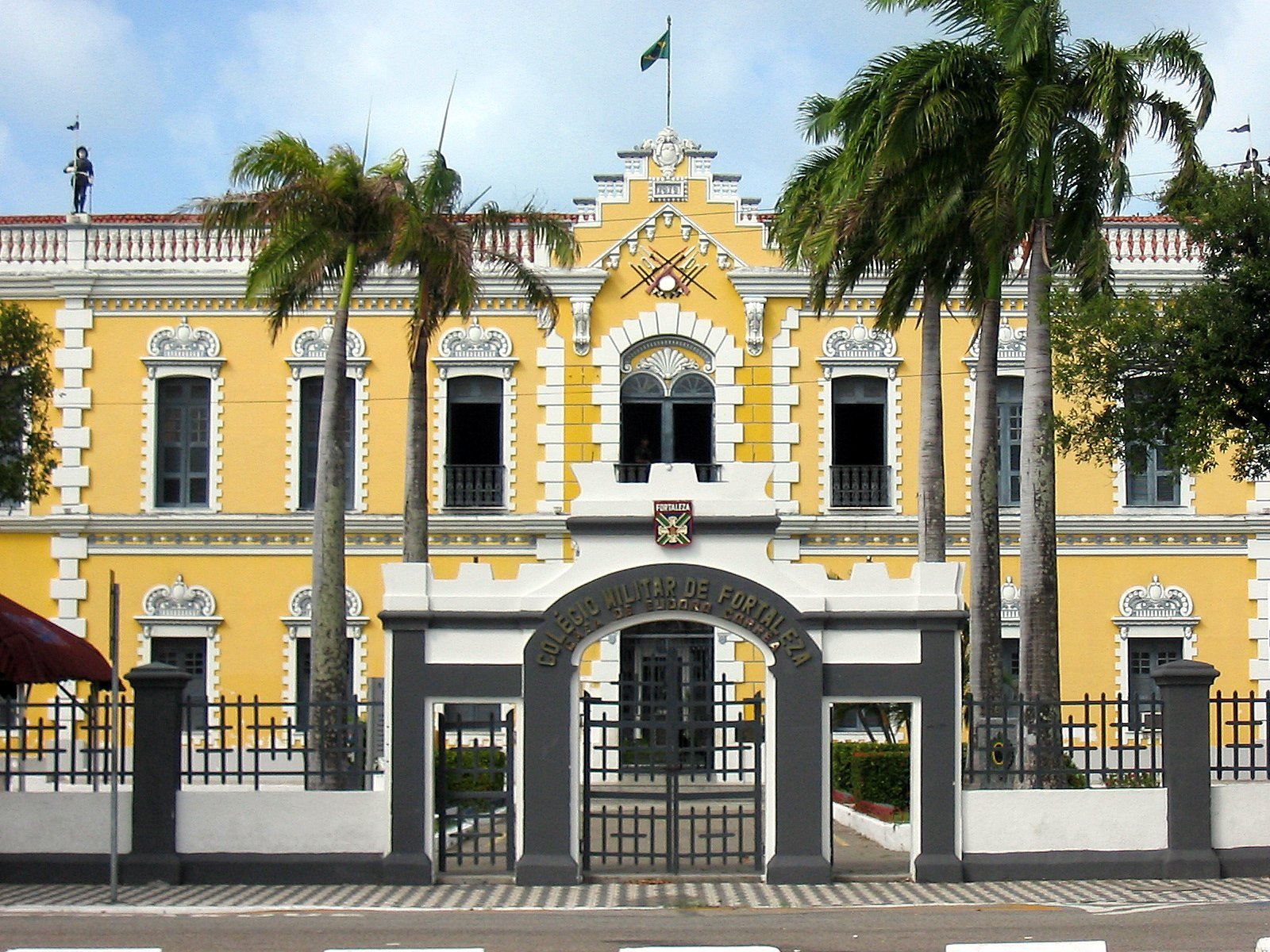
Colégio Militar de Fortaleza

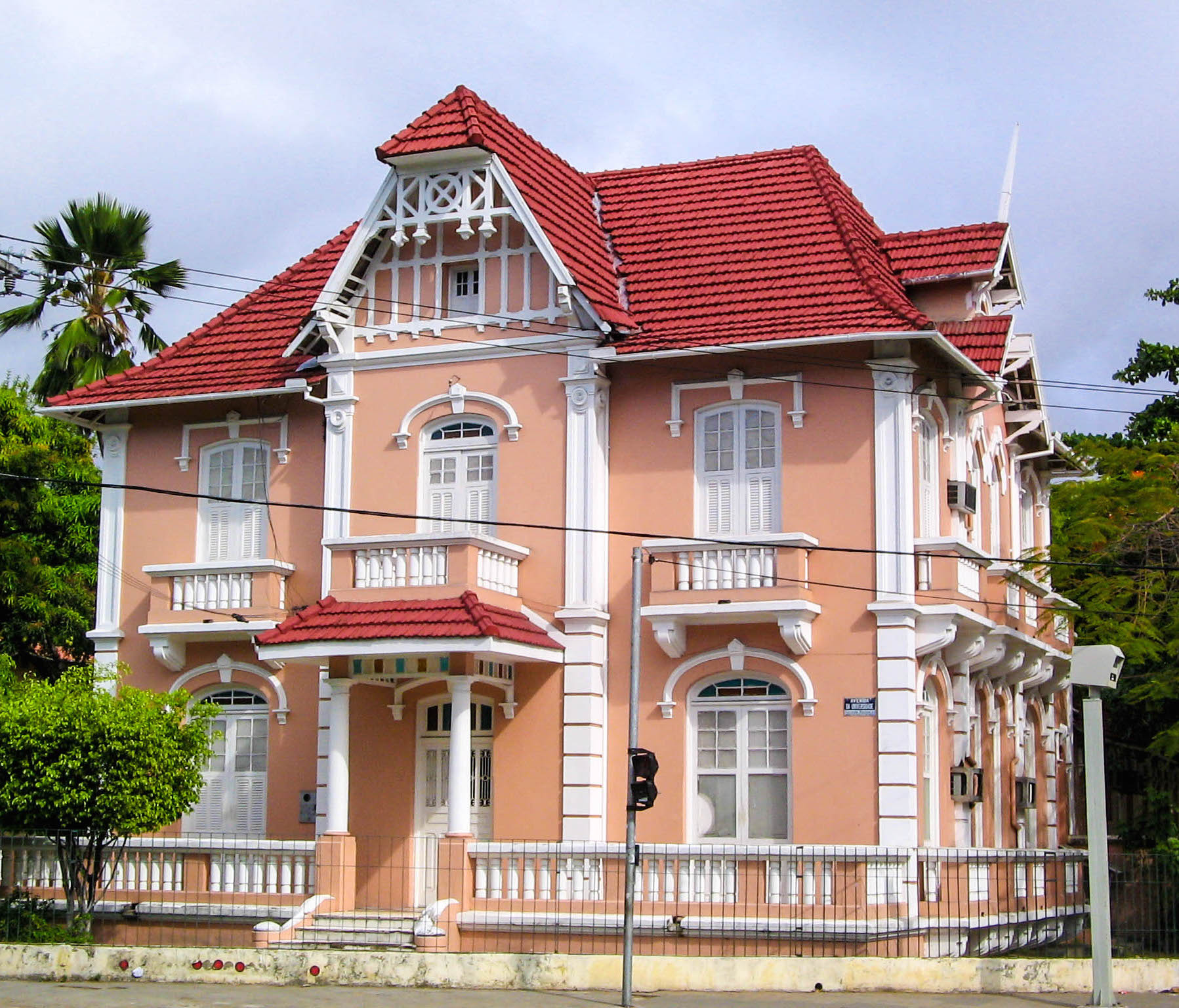
German culture house in Fortaleza

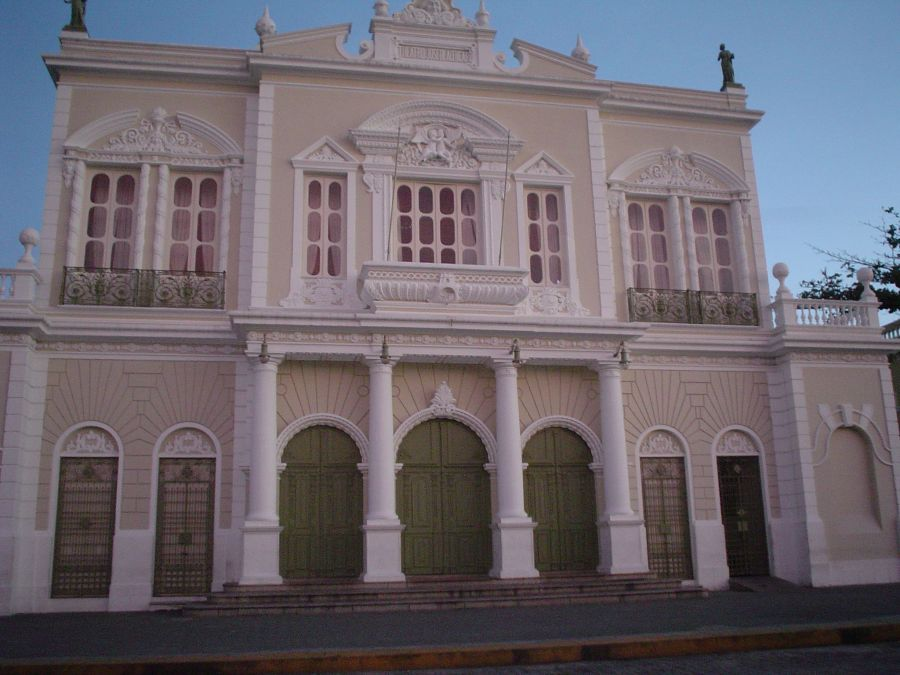
José de Alencar Theatre in Fortaleza

The territory of Ceará was originally inhabited by different Indian peoples, such as the Tabajara, Potyguara, Anacés, Kariri, Inhamum, Jucá, Kanindé, Tremembé, Paicaú and others, who had commercial relations with various European people, including the French, before the Portuguese decided to include the area in Brazil.

The first Portuguese plan for settling in Ceará dated from 1534, but the first attempts to settle the territory failed, and the earliest Portuguese settlement was made near the mouth of the Ceará River in 1603, by Pero Coelho de Sousa. He established the fort of São Tiago, but one year later he and his family abandoned Ceará because of a period of drought, a natural phenomenon that periodically afflicts the province, which the Portuguese settlers were ill-equipped to endure.

Portugal wanted to form a military base in Ceará to support the Portuguese operations in the war against the French. The first attempt with Pero Coelho de Sousa, in 1603, was not successful, and the French continued operating from Maranhão and Ibiapaba, where they had established a base in 1590. The Indians and French formed political and military alliances. In 1607, two Jesuits, Francisco Pinto and Pereira Figueira, arrived in Ceará with a mission to spy in the area of Ibiapaba. In October, that year Francisco Pinto was killed by the Indians and Pereira Filgueira returned with more information about the area and the French and Indian alliance.

In 1612, the French were successfully expelled from Ceará and Maranhão by a military expedition under the command of Portuguese Martim Soares Moreno. In the same year he constructed the fortress of São Sebastião on the same site as São Tiago, and one year later he left Ceará for Portugal. It was only in 1618 that Martim Soares Moreno returned to Ceará, and it is from this time that the Portuguese presence dates. This was restricted at first to the area of the Ceará River: Martim Soares Moreno made an alliance with the Indians of the Potiguara tribe. In 1631, he left Ceará to help the Portuguese against the Dutch in Pernambuco and the fort of São Sebastião lost its importance.

At this time, what is today Brazil was hotly disputed by the Dutch and the Portuguese. The area was invaded twice by the Dutch, in 1637 and in 1649. In 1637, the Dutch and the Indians took the Fort of São Sebastião and dominated Ceará. The Dutch expanded their presence in Ceará and made alliances with different Indian tribes. In 1639, Georg Marcgrave made an expedition in Ceará, but in 1644 the Indians attacked the Dutch Governor of Ceará, Gideon Morris, the Dutch soldiers were killed, and São Sebastião was destroyed.

There were no Europeans in the region between 1644 and 1649, but in 1649, before negotiations with the different Indian tribes, Matias Beck arrived in Ceará to explore silver mines of Maranguape. Good-quality silver was not found however. In this period the Dutch built another fort, by the banks of river Pajeú, and named it Fort Schoonenborch after one of their commanders. In 1654, the Dutch were expelled from Brazil; the Portuguese took Schoonenborch, changed its name to Fortaleza de Nossa Senhora de Assunção (The Fortress of Our Lady of the Assumption), and the different Indian tribes that had made alliance with the Dutch had to flee from Portuguese persecution.

In 1661, the Netherlands formally ceded their Brazilian territories to the Portuguese crown, ending conflict in the region. Ceará became a dependency of Pernambuco in 1680; this relationship lasted until 1799, when the Captaincy of Ceará was made independent.

The fight for Brazilian independence in 1822 was fierce in Ceará, with the area being a rebel stronghold that incurred vicious retribution from loyalists. The captaincy became a province in 1822 under Dom Pedro I. A revolution followed in 1824, the president of the province was deposed fifteen days after his arrival, and a republic was proclaimed. Internal dissensions immediately broke out, the new president was assassinated, and after a brief reign of terror the province resumed its allegiance to the empire.

Ceará became the first province of Brazil to abolish slavery, on March 25, 1884, more than four years before the 1888 national law of abolition, passed by Princess Isabel.

The reign of Dom Pedro II of the Empire of Brazil saw great advances in infrastructure in Ceará, with the commerce increasing by a large amount, and with gas lighting becoming almost ubiquitous.

The state of Ceará became a bishopric of the Roman Catholic Church in 1853, the bishop residing at Fortaleza.

Two railway lines running inland from the coast (the Baturité line from Fortaleza to Senador Pompeu, 179 miles (288 km), and the Sobral line from the port of Camocim to Ipu, 134 miles), were built by the national government after the drought of 1877–1878 to give work to the starving refugees, and were later operated under leases. Dams were also built for irrigation purposes.

The population numbered 805,687 in 1890, and 849,127 in 1900. In 1900, approximately five-sixths of the population lived on estates, owned no property, paid no taxes, and derived few benefits from the social and political institutions about them. Education was then confined almost exclusively to the upper classes, from which came some of the most prominent men in Brazilian politics and literature.

In the early 20th century the sandy zone along the coast was nearly barren, but the more elevated region behind the coast with broken surfaces and sandy soil produced fruit and most tropical products when conditions were favourable. The natural vegetable production was important, and included manigoba or Ceará rubber, carnahuba wax and fibre, cashew wine and ipecacuanha. The principal agricultural products were cotton, coffee, sugar, manioc and tropical fruits. The production of cotton increased largely with the development of cotton manufacture in Brazil.

The higher plateau was devoted almost exclusively to cattle raising, once the principal industry of the state, although recurring droughts created an obstacle to its profitable development. The state exported considerable amounts of cattle, hides and skins.

Since 1960, the Orós Dam, comparable in size to the Aswan Dam has supplied Ceará with much of its water, and in 1995 construction began on the enormous Castanhão Dam, completed in 2003, which is able to hold 6.5 km^{3} of water.

== Politics and government ==
Ceará is governed by the Governor of Ceará, currently Elmano de Freitas since 2023, and the Legislative Assembly of Ceará.

== Demographics ==
Historical population
Year	Pop.	±%
1872	721,686	—
1890	805,687	+11.6%
1900	849,127	+5.4%
1920	1,319,228	+55.4%
1940	2,091,032	+58.5%
1950	2,695,450	+28.9%
1960	3,337,856	+23.8%
1970	4,491,590	+34.6%
1980	5,380,432	+19.8%
1991	6,362,620	+18.3%
2000	7,431,597	+16.8%
2010	8,452,381	+13.7%
2022	8,794,957	+4.1%

According to the 2022 IBGE census, there were 8.794.957 people residing in the state. The population density was 59.07 inhabitants/km^{2}.

Urbanization: 76.9% (2022); Population growth: 0.38% (2024–2025); Houses: 2,181,000 (2006).

The last PNAD (National Research for Sample of Domiciles) census revealed the following numbers: 5,690,973 Pardos (Multiracial) people (64.7%), 2,456,214 White people (27.9%), 595,694 Black people (6.8%), 39,982 Amerindian people (0.5%), 11,256 Asian people (0.1%).

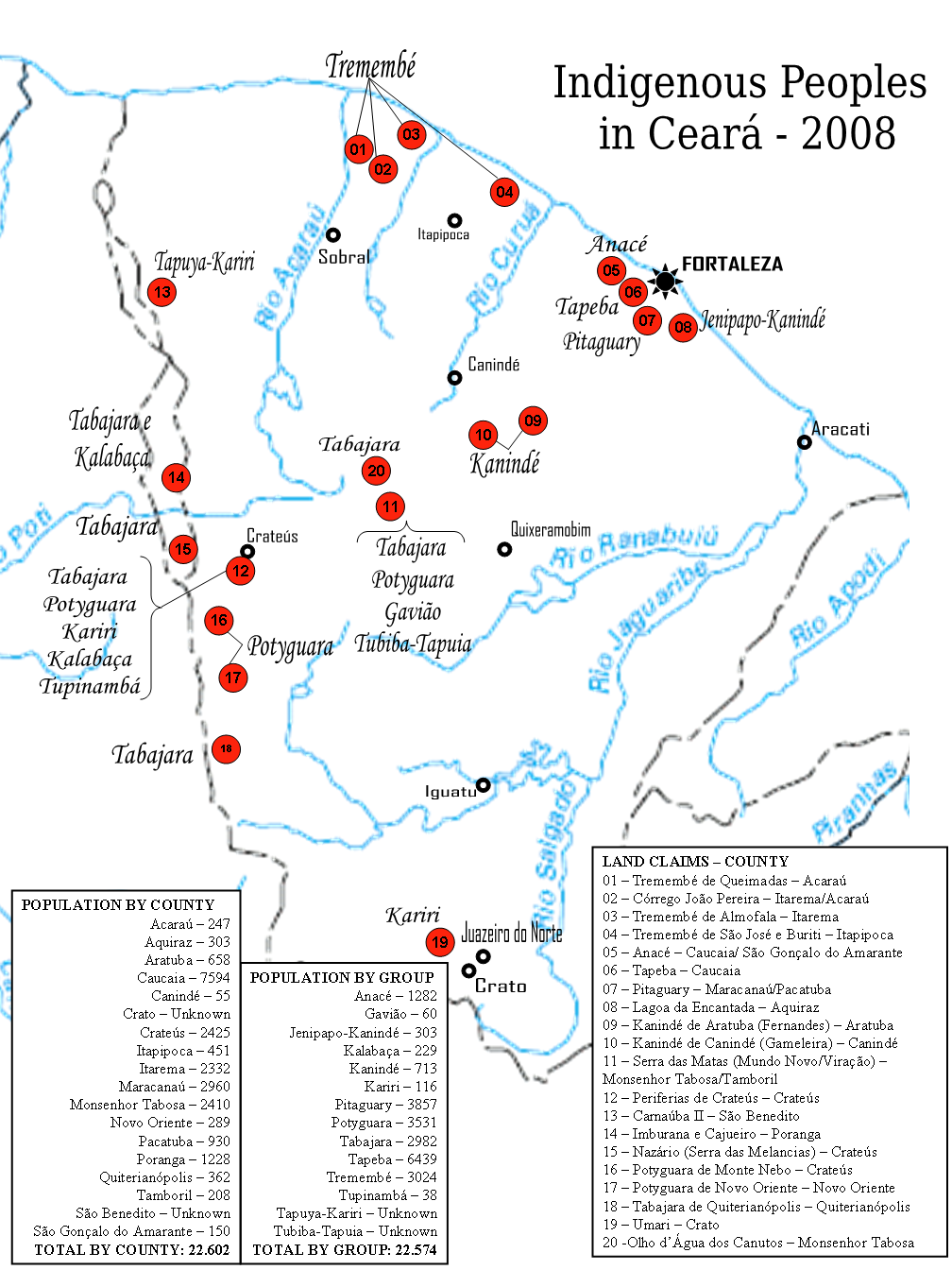
Map of indigenous groups in Ceará

=== Largest cities ===
Largest cities or towns of Ceará (2011 census of Instituto Brasileiro de Geografia e Estatística)
	Rank	Name	Pop.	Rank	Name	Pop.	
Fortaleza Caucaia Sobral	1	Fortaleza	2,210,282	11	Canindé	74,847	Juazeiro do Norte Maracanaú Crato
Fortaleza Caucaia Sobral	2	Caucaia	324,854	12	Crateús	72,959	Juazeiro do Norte Maracanaú Crato
Fortaleza Caucaia Sobral	3	Juazeiro do Norte	153,841	13	Aquiraz	73,880	Juazeiro do Norte Maracanaú Crato
Fortaleza Caucaia Sobral	4	Maracanaú	108,267	14	Pacatuba	73,560	Juazeiro do Norte Maracanaú Crato
Fortaleza Caucaia Sobral	5	Sobral	101,724	15	Quixeramobim	72,865	Juazeiro do Norte Maracanaú Crato
Fortaleza Caucaia Sobral	6	Crato	100,716	16	Russas	70,793	Juazeiro do Norte Maracanaú Crato
Fortaleza Caucaia Sobral	7	Itapipoca	99,000	17	Aracati	69,771	Juazeiro do Norte Maracanaú Crato
Fortaleza Caucaia Sobral	8	Maranguape	98,464	18	Tianguá	69,723	Juazeiro do Norte Maracanaú Crato
Fortaleza Caucaia Sobral	9	Iguatu	97,330	19	Cascavel	66,834	Juazeiro do Norte Maracanaú Crato
Fortaleza Caucaia Sobral	10	Quixadá	81,444	20	Icó	65,681	Juazeiro do Norte Maracanaú Crato

=== Religion ===
Religion in Ceará (2010)
1. Catholicism (78.8%)
2. Protestantism (14.6%)
3. Spiritism (0.60%)
4. Other (2.00%)
5. No religion (4.00%)

Religion is very important in the culture of Ceará, being an extremely important factor in the construction of the identity of the people. Catholicism is the hegemony religion in Ceará and is the Christian confession that left most marks in Ceara's culture. It was the only one recognized by the government until 1883, when the Presbyterian Church of Fortaleza was founded in the state capital. Roman Catholicism in Ceará presents several influences of indigenous beliefs. A large portion of traditional Christian manifestations in Ceará are strongly influenced by religious syncretism.

Throughout the 20th century, several churches were installed in the State and at the end of that century there was a considerable increase in people from other religions. However, Ceará is still the third Brazilian state with the highest proportion of Roman Catholics, 78.8% of the population, according to data from 2010 census. Evangelicals are 14.6%, Spiritists, 0.6%, members of other religions, 2.0%, and those without religion, 4.0%.

=== Statistics ===
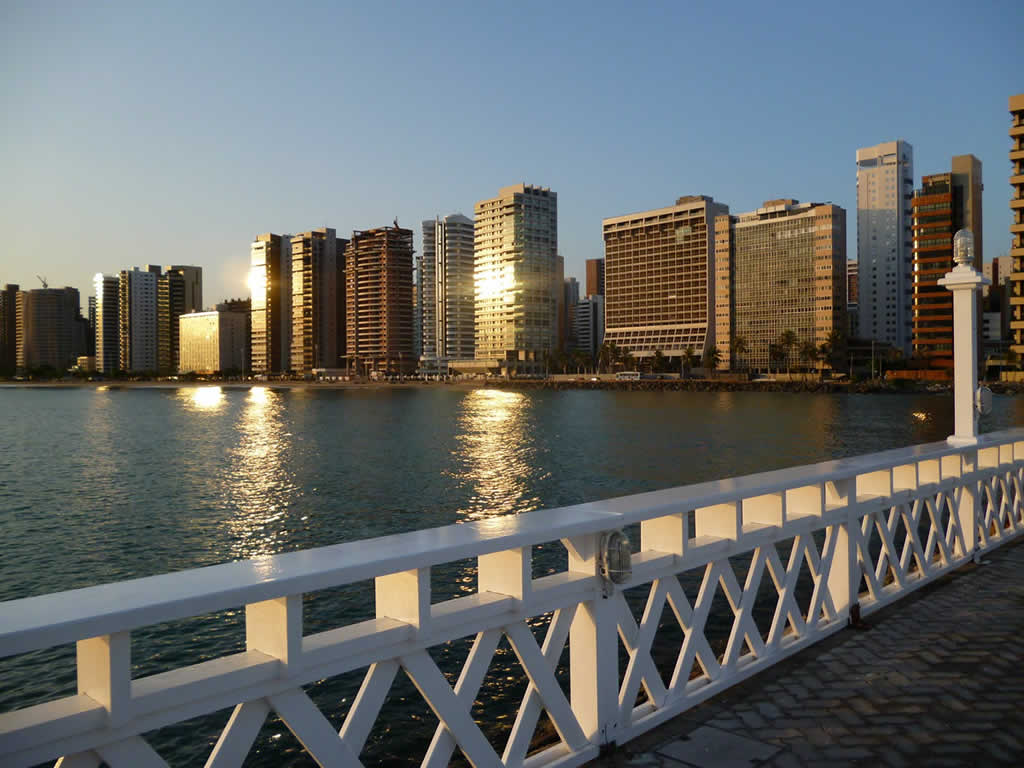
Fortaleza

Vehicles: 1,084,991 (March/2007); Mobile phones: 3.5 million (April/2007); Telephones: 908 thousand (April/2007); Cities: 184 (2007).

=== Education ===
There are more than 53 higher education institutions in the state of Ceará

==== Higher education institutions ====
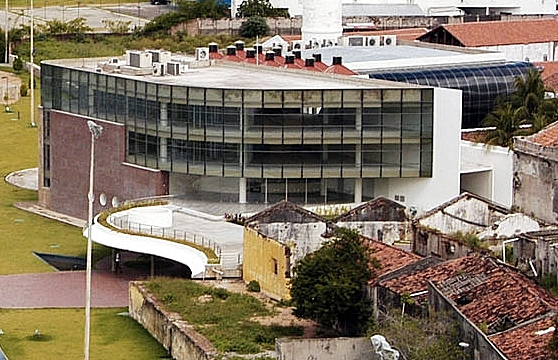
Public Library of Sobral

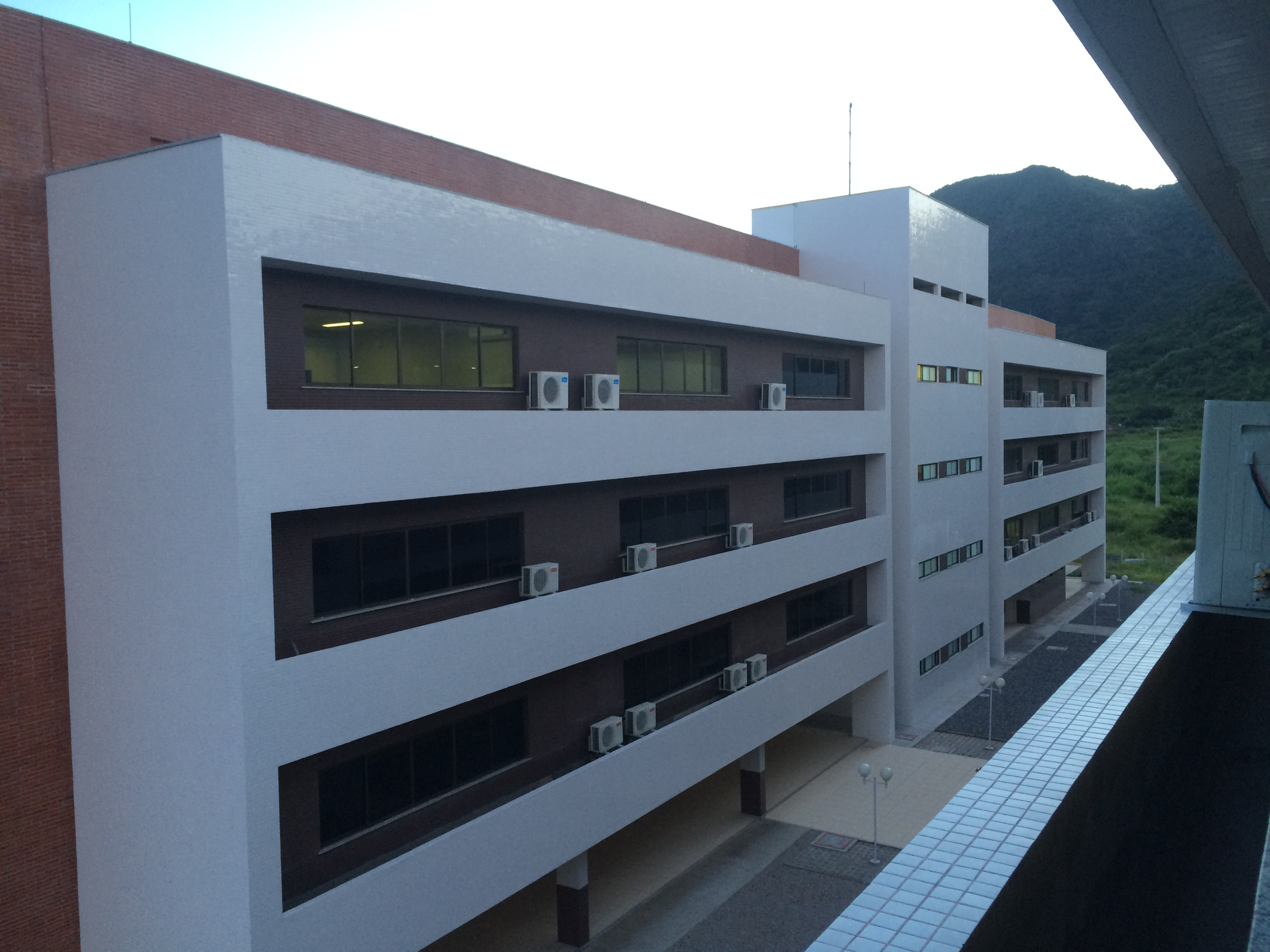
Academic Building at UNILAB

- Universidade da Integração Internacional da Lusofonia Afro-Brasileira (UNILAB) (University of International Integration of the Afro-Brazilian Lusophony)
- Universidade Federal do Ceará (UFC) (Federal University of Ceará);
- Universidade Estadual do Ceará (UECE) (State University of Ceará);
- Universidade Federal do Cariri (UFCA);
- Faculdade 7 de Setembro (FA7);
- Instituto Federal do Ceará (IFCE);
- Universidade de Fortaleza (UNIFOR) (University of Fortaleza);
- State University of Vale do Acaraú (Uva) (University of Acaraú Valley);
- Universidade Regional do Cariri (URCA) (Regional University of Cariri);
- Instituto Teológico Jeová Rafá;
- Universidade Nacional de Teologia do Brasil (UTEB)
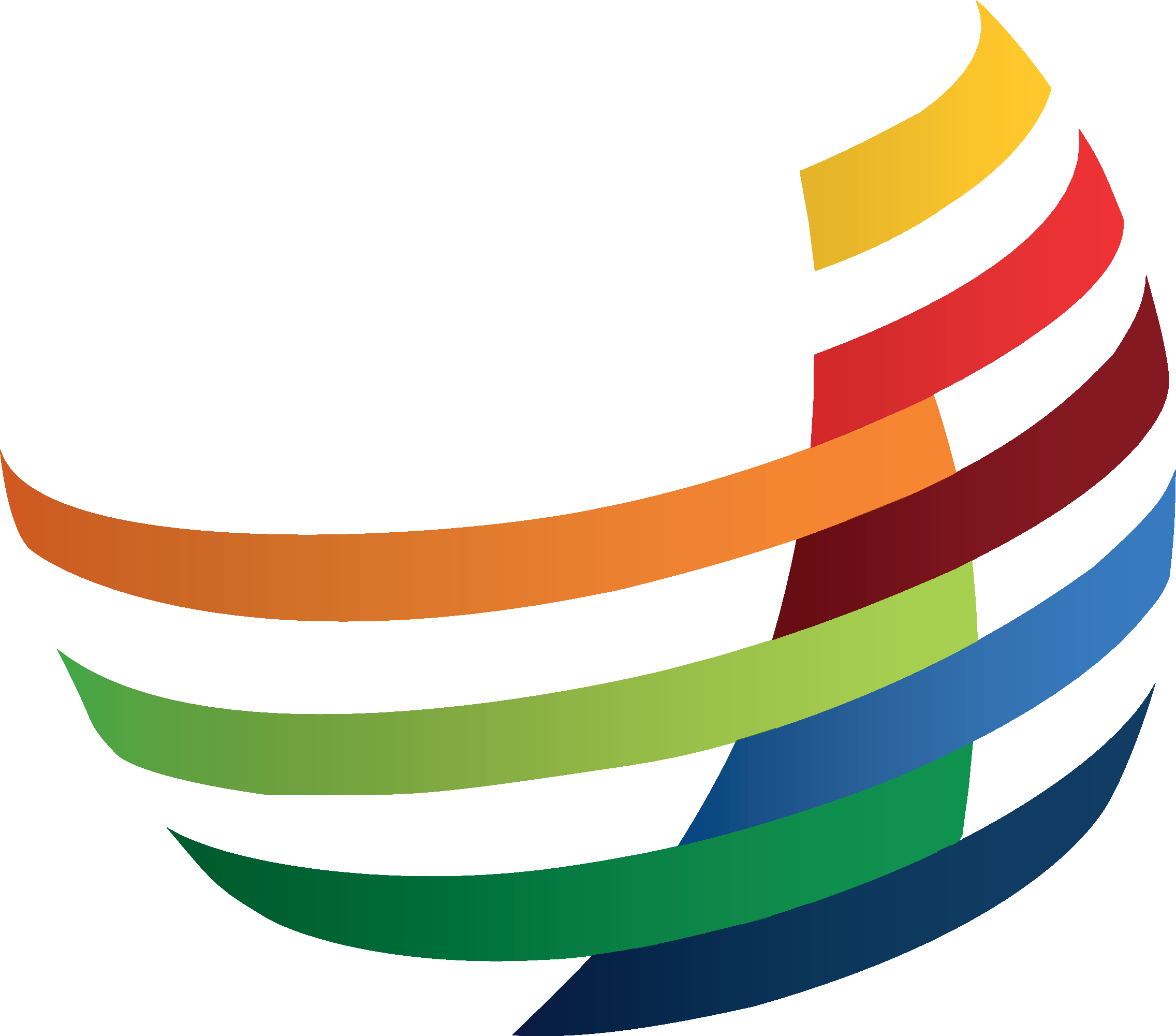
UNILAB

UFC

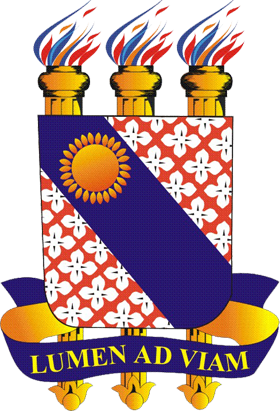
UECE

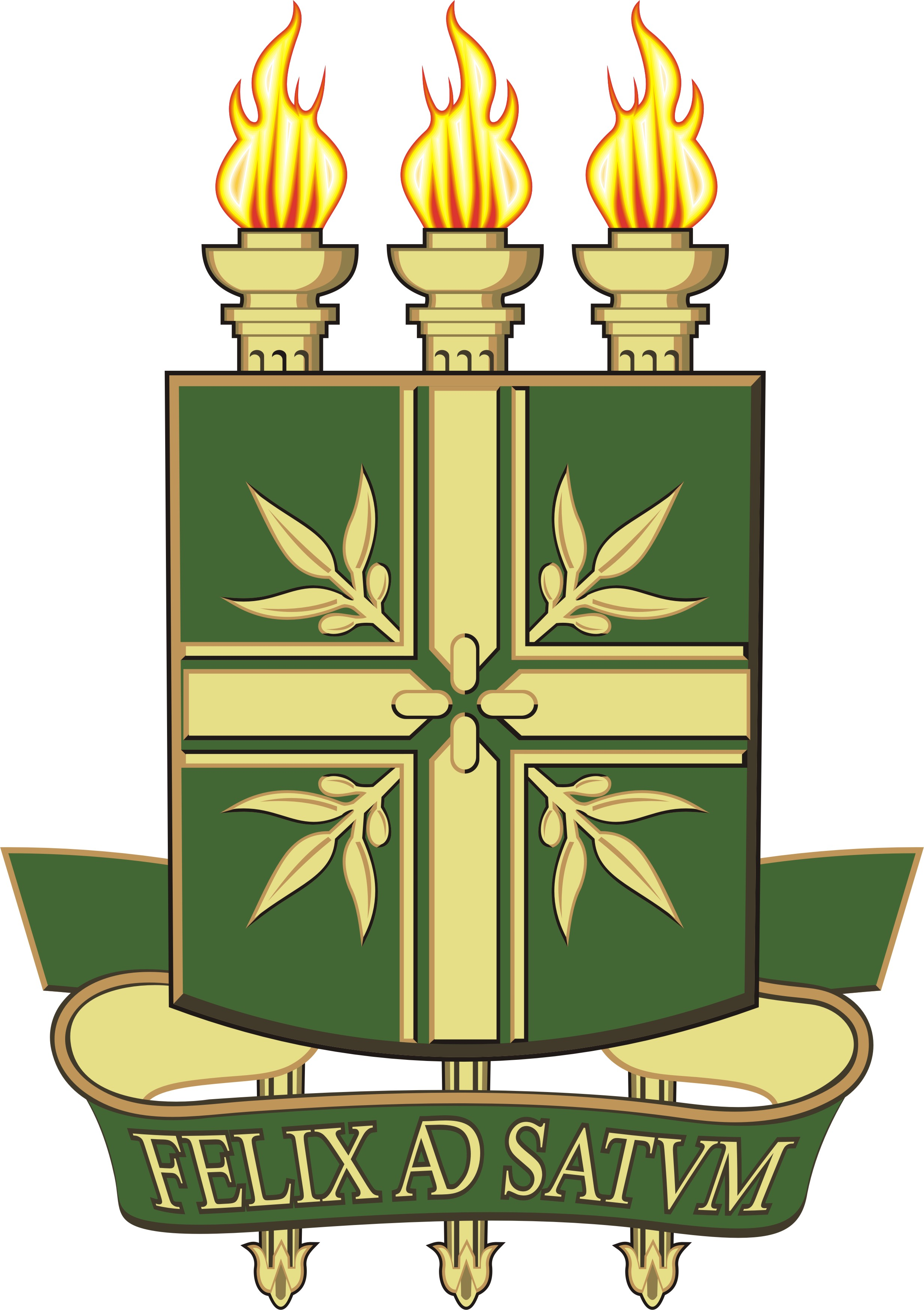
URCA

== Economy ==
The service sector is the largest component of GDP at 73.28%, followed by the industrial sector at 20.49%. Agriculture represents 6.23% of GDP (2021). Ceará exports: cast iron, iron and steel (53,08%), shoes and similar artifacts (13,12%), fruits (7,66%), mineral fuels and derived products (3,81%), fish, crustaceans and other aquatic invertebrates (3,68%) (2023). It is one of only three Brazilian states which together produce the world's entire supply of carnauba wax.

Share of the Brazilian economy: 2,16% (2021).

According to the data from IPECE and IBGE, the GDP growth of the State of Ceará in 2021 was of 4.76%, while Brazil's overall GDP grew 4,76% as well in the same year.

Traditionally an agriculture-based state, Ceará began an industrialisation program under the military regime (1964–1985), and the industrial sector continues to expand annually. In 1999, industry accounted for 39.3% of the state's GDP. Tourism also plays a large role in Ceará's economy, with the state's many waterfalls, beaches and rainforests. On average, Fortaleza alone receives half a million tourists annually.

In agriculture, the state stands out in the production of cashew nuts, coconut, papaya, melon and beans.

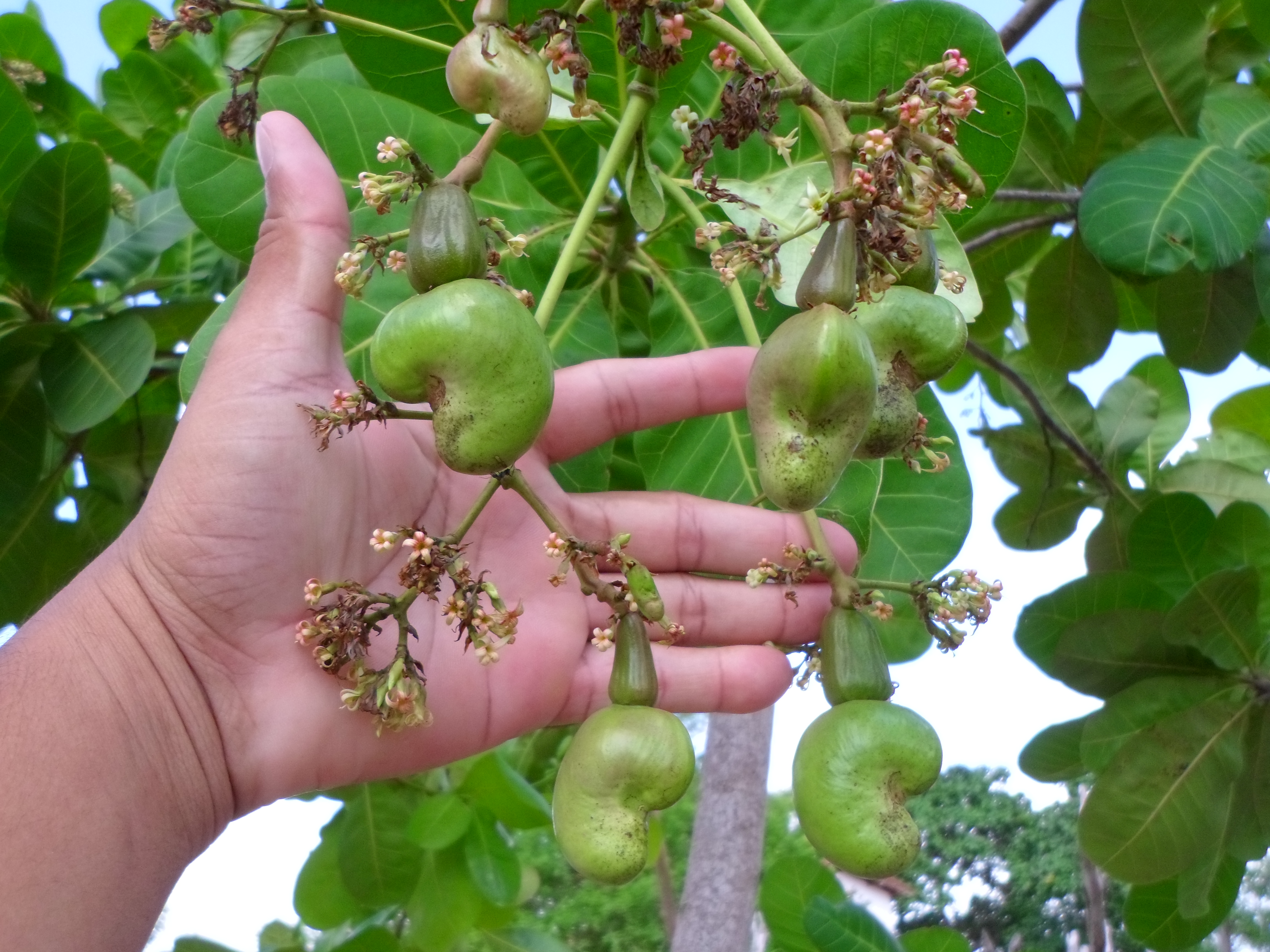
Cashew in Ceará

The production of cashew in Brazil is carried out almost exclusively in the Northeast. The area occupied by cashew trees in Brazil in 2017 was estimated at 505,500 ha; of this total, 99.5% is located in the Northeast. The main producers in this region are Ceará (61.6% of the national area), Rio Grande do Norte and Piauí. However, Brazil, which in 2011 was the fifth largest world producer of cashew nuts, in 2016, fell to 14th position, with 1.5% of the total volume of nuts produced in the world. Vietnam, Nigeria, India and Côte d'Ivoire were the world's largest cashew nut producers in 2016, with 70.6% of global production. In recent years, there has been increased competition with some African countries, where government programs have driven the expansion of culture and processing capacity. It is estimated that at 295 thousand tons per year the installed capacity for processing cashew nuts in the Northeast, however, the Region only managed to produce around a quarter of that quantity. Among the main world producers, Brazil has the lowest productivity. Several factors are pointed out as the cause of the low productivity and the fall in the Brazilian production of cashew nuts. One reason is that most orchards are in a phase of natural decline in production. In addition, the giant cashew trees, which are the majority in the Region, are exploited in an almost extractive manner, with low use of technology.

In 2017, the Northeast Region was the largest producer of coconut in the country, with 74.0% of national production. Bahia produced 351 million fruits, Sergipe, 234 million, and Ceará 187 million. However, the sector has been suffering strong competition and losing market to Indonesia, the Philippines and India, the world's largest producers, who even export coconut water to Brazil. In addition to climatic problems, the low productivity of coconut palms in the Northeast Region is the result of factors related to the variety of coconut harvested and the technological level used in coastal regions. In these areas, the semi-extractive cultivation system still prevails, with low fertility and without the adoption of cultural management practices. The three states that have the largest production, Bahia, Sergipe and Ceará, present a yield three times lower than that of Pernambuco, which is in 5th place in the national production. This is because most of the coconut trees in these three states are located in coastal areas and cultivated in semi-extractivist systems.

In 2018, the South Region was the main producer of beans with 26.4% of the total, followed by the Midwest (25.4%), Southeast Region (25.1%), Northeast (20.6%) and North (2.5%). The largest producers in the Northeast were Ceará and Bahia.

In cassava production, Brazil produced a total of 17.6 million tons in 2018. Maranhão was the 7th largest producer in the country, with 681 thousand tons. Ceará was 9th, with 622 thousand tons. In total, the northeast produced 3,5 million tons.

Rio Grande do Norte is the largest producer of melon in the country. In 2017 it produced 354 thousand tons. The Northeast region accounted for 95.8% of the country's production in 2007. In addition to Rio Grande do Norte, which in 2005 produced 45.4% of the country's total, the other 3 largest in the country were Ceará, Bahia and Pernambuco.

In the production of papaya, in 2018 Bahia was the 2nd largest producer state in Brazil, almost equaling with Espírito Santo. Ceará was in 3rd place and Rio Grande do Norte in 4th place.

In the production of banana, in 2018 Ceará was the 8th largest national producer, with 408 thousand tons.

The state stands out nationally in raising goats and sheep. In 2016, Ceará had the fourth largest herd of goats in the country, with 1.13 million heads. The state occupied the same position in the herd of sheep, with 2.31 million animals.

Ceará's cattle herd is small compared to other states in Brazil. In 2019, it had 2.4 million heads. Milk production was 705 million liters this year.

In 2017, the Northeast was the largest shrimp producer in the country. National production was 41 thousand tons. Rio Grande do Norte (37.7%) and Ceará (28.9%) were the largest producers. Aracati, in Ceara, was the municipality with the highest participation.

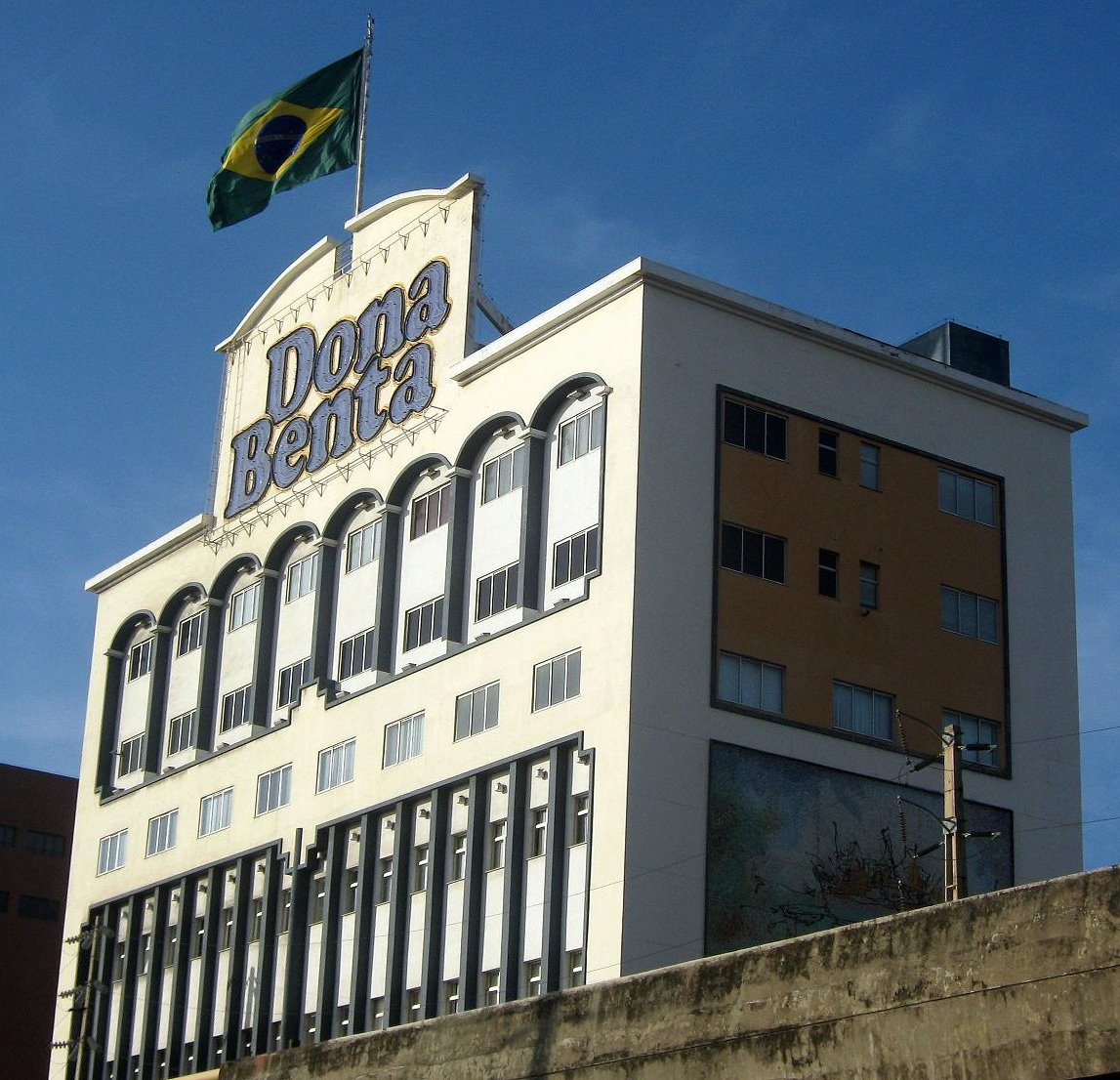
J Macêdo, one of the largest pasta industries in Brazil

About industry, Ceará had in 2017 an industrial GDP of R$22.2 billion, equivalent to 1.9% of the national industry. It employs 296,734 workers in the industry. The main industrial sectors are: Construction (26.2%), Industrial Public Utility Services, such as Electricity and Water (22.5%), Food (11.0%), Leather and footwear (10.5%) and Clothing (5.5%). These 5 sectors concentrate 75.7% of the state's industry.

The main sectors of the Ceará industry are clothing, food, metallurgy, textiles, chemicals and footwear. Most of the industries are installed in the Metropolitan Region of Fortaleza, where the Industrial District of Maracanaú is located. In São Gonçalo do Amarante, a steel mill is installed, Companhia Siderúrgica do Pecém, which in 2018 produced 2.9 million tons of crude steel, of the 35.4 million produced in the country.

Some of the large companies in Ceará with national reach are: Aço Cearense (steel), Companhia de Alimentos do Nordeste (food), Grendene (footwear), Café Santa Clara (coffee), Grande Moinho Cearense (mill), Edson Queiroz Group (business conglomerate, works with gas, mineral water, household appliances, communications, education, among others), Naval Industry of Ceará, J. Macêdo, M. Dias Branco (food company that manufactures, markets and distributes cookies, pasta, cakes, snacks, wheat flour, margarine and vegetable fats) and Ypióca.

The state is generally poor. According to 2013 data, 396,370 people live in slums in Fortaleza. Fortaleza has the 2nd largest population in a slum among cities in the Northeast. 31.6% of residents have income per capita up to half the minimum wage. The state's productivity is small.

== Tourism and recreation ==
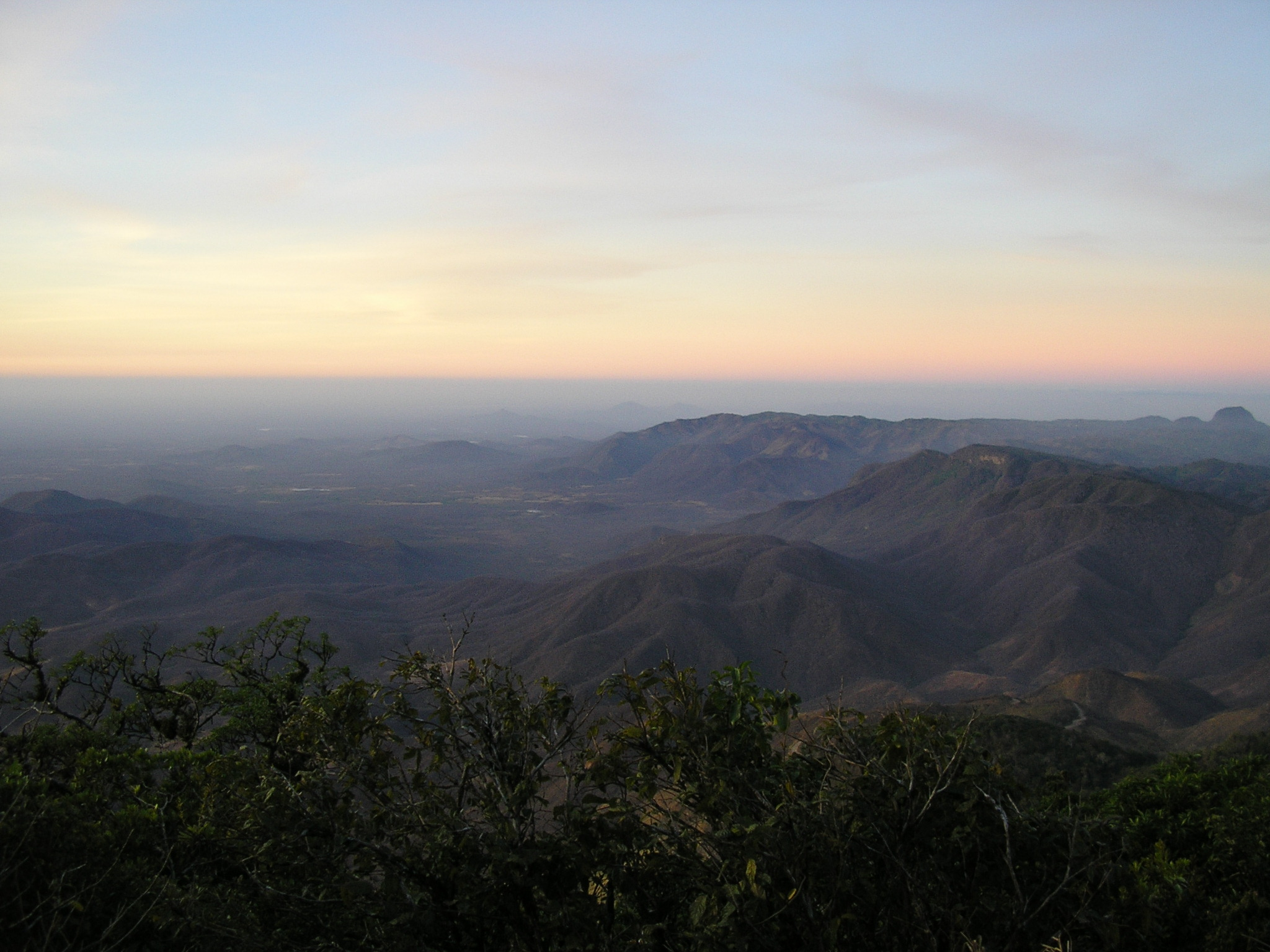
Guaramiranga, in Maciço de Baturité, Ceará

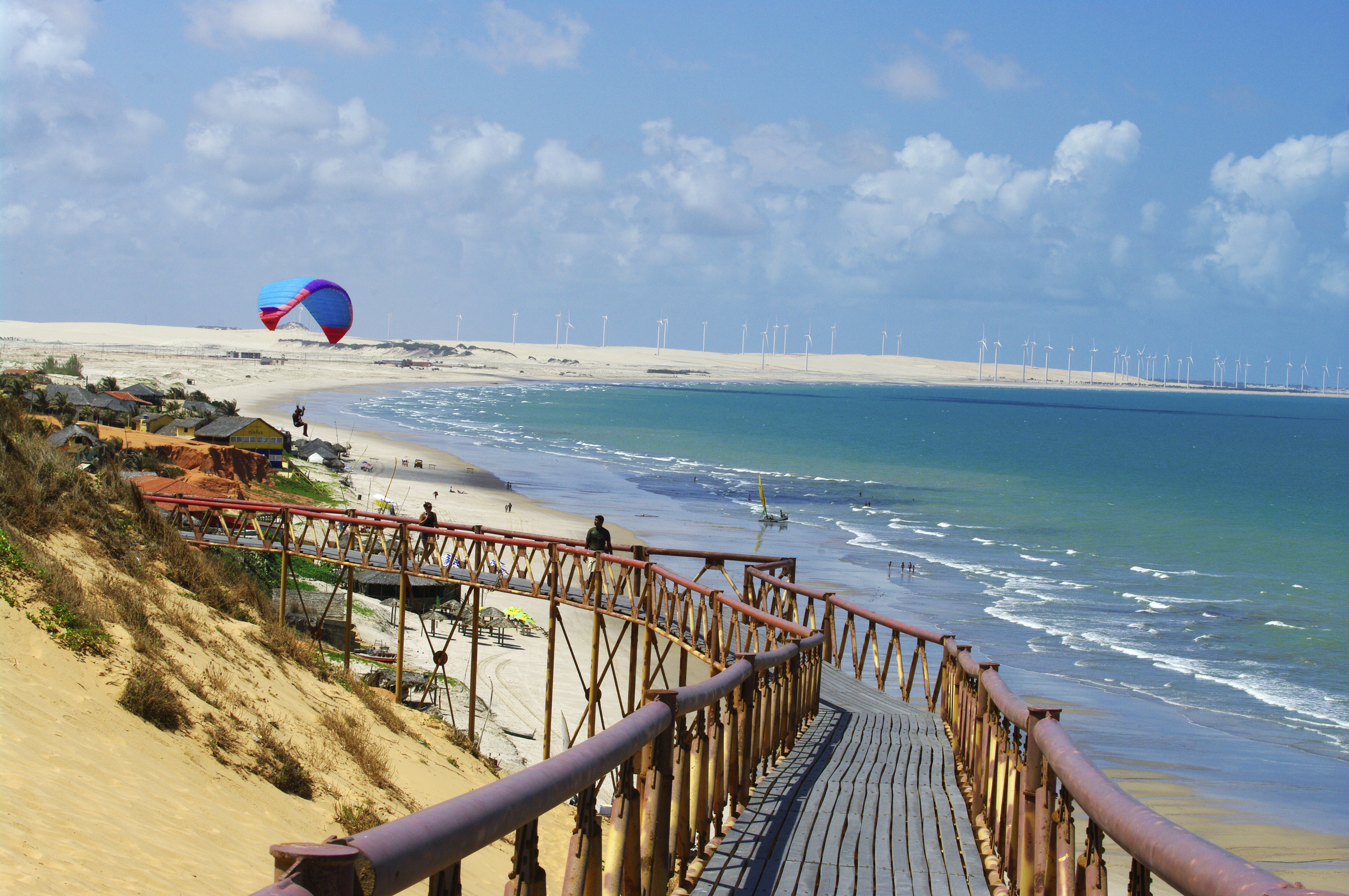
Canoa Quebrada Beach in Aracati

Fortaleza's international airport (Pinto Martins airport) is served by international flights from North and Central America as well as Europe.

The beach of Cumbuco, located in the municipality of Caucaia (neighbour to Fortaleza), is considered one of the best places in the world for the practicing of kitesurfing.

Jericoacoara National Park is a windswept region, with the population consisting of local fisherman and with travellers. Some of the available activities are: forro dancing and music, Capoeira, kite and windsurfing, sand buggy tours to the Lagoa Azul nearby, and the experiences of Ayahuasca.

=== Main tourist attractions ===
- Guaramiranga Mountains
- Canoa Quebrada Beach (in Aracati)
- Morro Branco
- Praia Do Futuro
- Jericoacoara Beach (profiled on E! Network's Wild On! series in 2000)

== Infrastructure ==
=== International airport ===
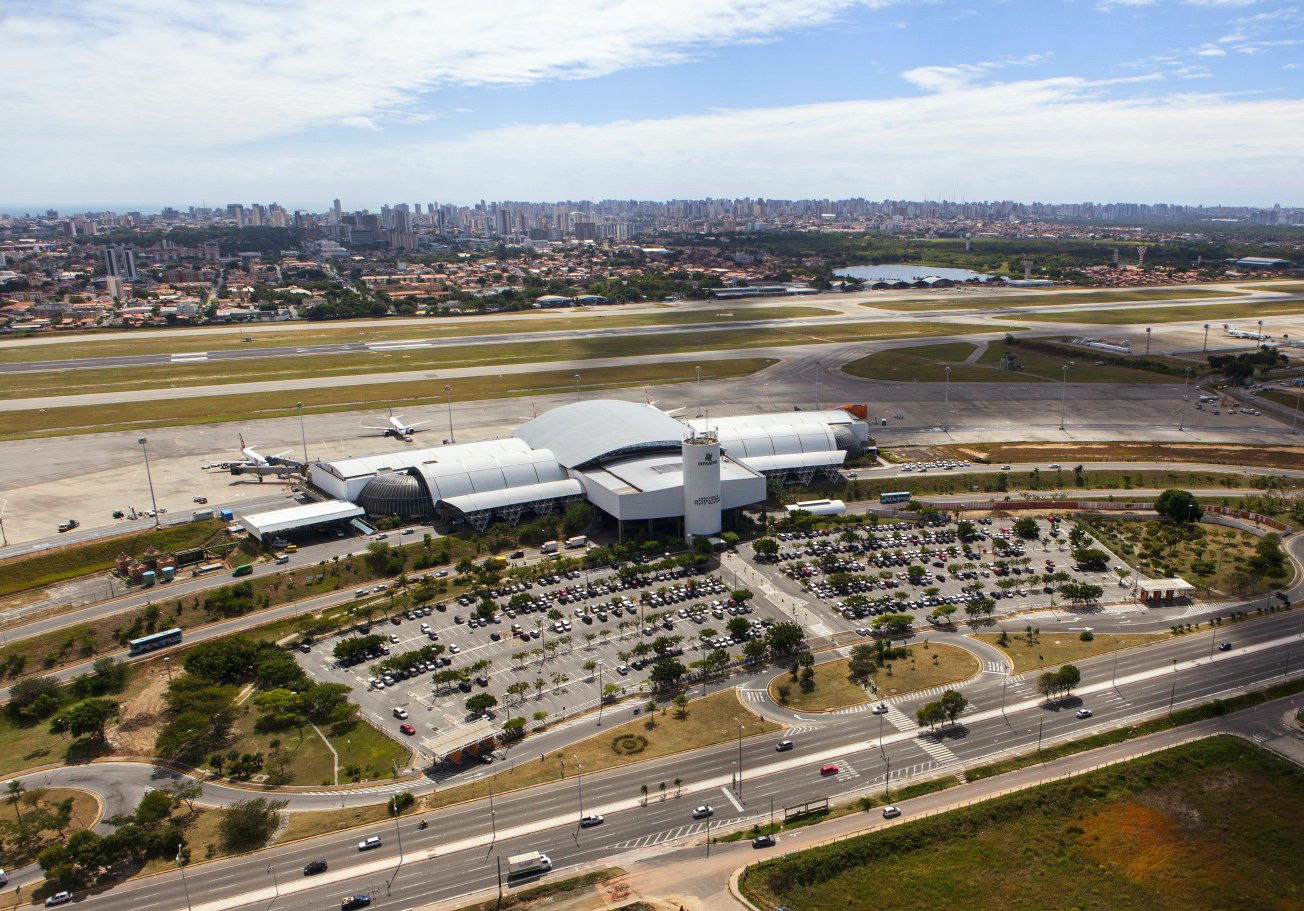
View of Fortaleza's International Airport

The Pinto Martins International Airport is situated in Fortaleza. The passenger terminal is air conditioned and has four levels. The basement level has parking for 1,000 cars as well as automatic teller machines and a stop for regular city buses. The ground level has 31 check-in counters, airline offices, car rental agencies, special tourist information, a juvenile court bureau to facilitate travel of minors, a National Civil Aviation Agency (ANAC) office, information counter, passenger arrival area and access to two taxi stops.

The second level contains shops, a food court and domestic and international boarding lounges. The top floor has a beer garden and panoramic deck overlooking the maneuvering apron with a view of the Fortaleza skyline. The apron is 152,857 square meters and can accommodate 14 aircraft at once in pre-established positions ("boxes").

The scheduled airlines operating out of Fortaleza are Cabo Verde Airlines, TAP, Delta Air Lines, Gol, TAM, Webjet, OceanAir and TAF. The airport also frequently receives domestic and international charter flights. The passenger terminal, opened in 1998, was designed to have a useful life of 50 years. The former terminal, called the General Aviation Terminal, is now used for general aviation and the fire brigade. The control tower is located alongside.

Construction of a cargo terminal is the next big step planned by Infraero. The new terminal will have roughly eight thousand square meters, boosting the cargo storage and handling capacity fourfold. Plans then call for the new terminal to be integrated with highway and railroad links.

=== Highways ===
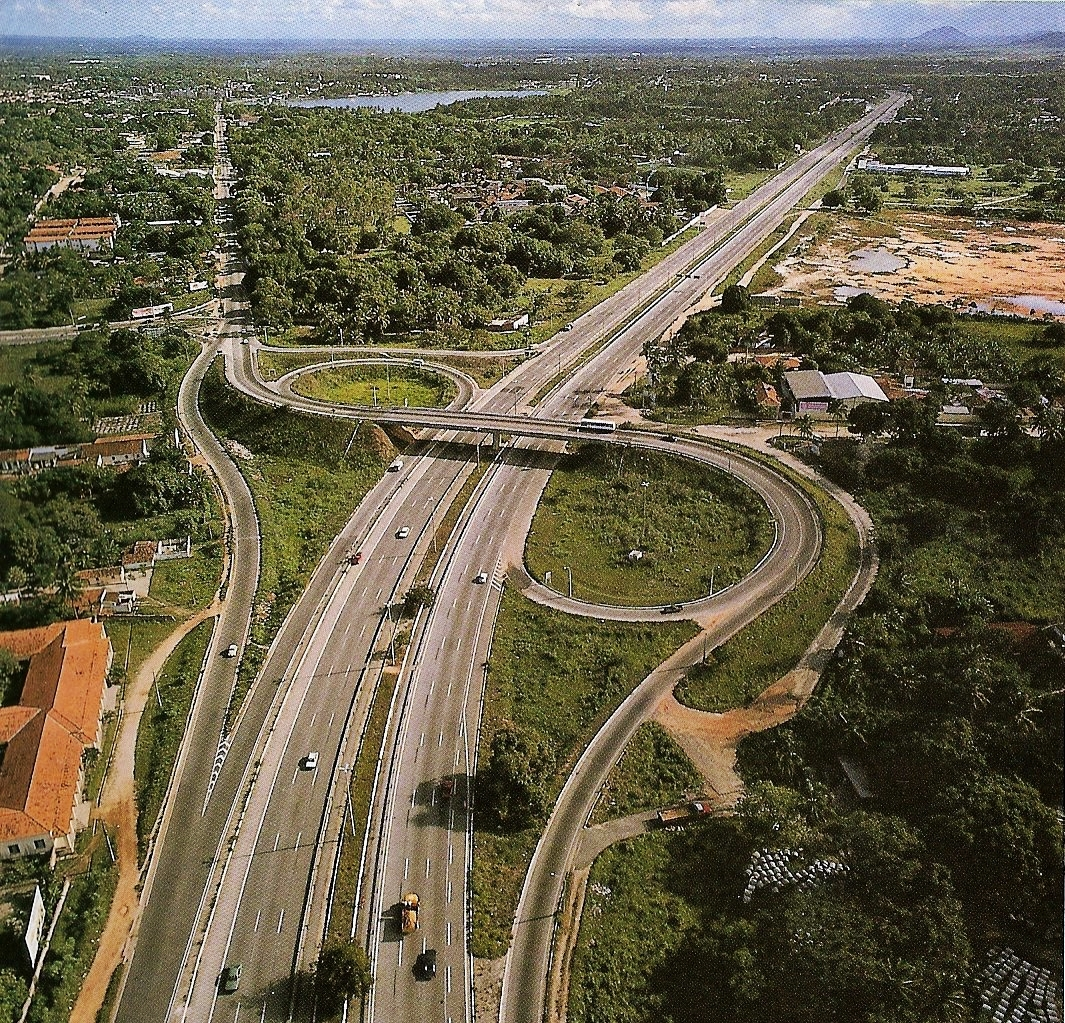
View of Fortaleza's BR-116 entrance

Highways in Ceará include:

- BR-020
- BR-116
- BR-122
- BR-222
- BR-226
- BR-230
- BR-304
- BR-402
- BR-403
- BR-404
- CE-004
- CE-040
- CE-060

=== Ports ===
The Port of Fortaleza is located in the inlet of the Mucuripe and is a man-made port, including an oil platform. The quay stretches 1,054 meters. There are 6,000 square meters of warehouses and more than 100,000 square meters of dock for containers. There are still two wheat mills, interconnected to the railway system by an extensive maneuvering dock.

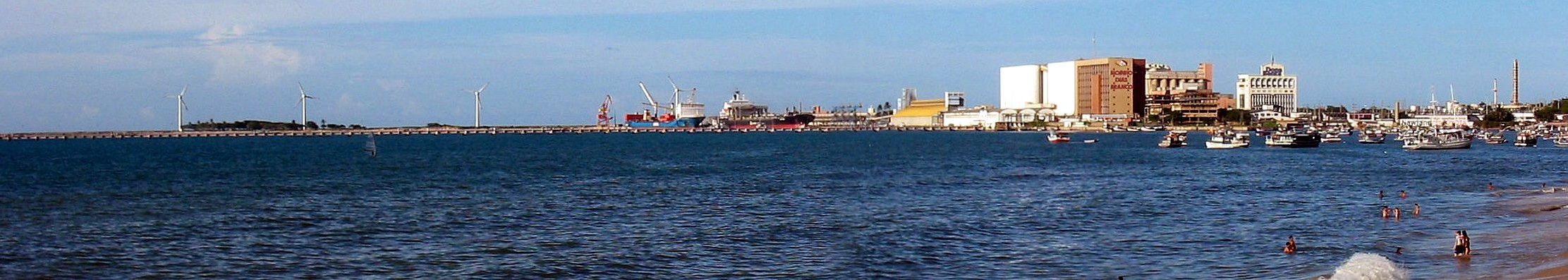
Port of Fortaleza

The Port of Pecem is the other big port facility in the state, located in the municipality of São Gonçalo do Amarante, about 60 kilometers from Fortaleza.

== Sports ==
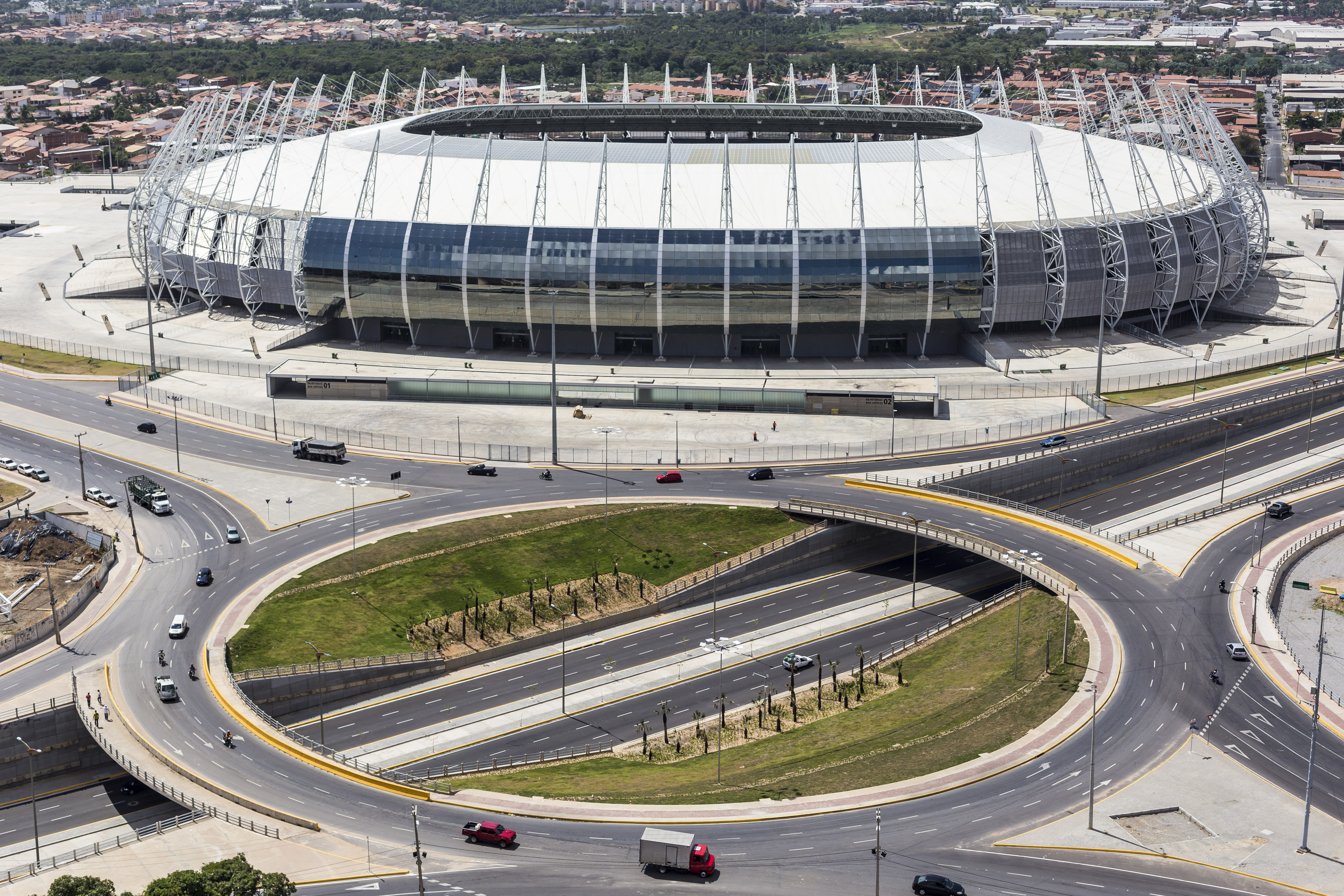
Arena Castelão in Fortaleza

Fortaleza provides visitors and residents with various sport activities. The most popular sport there, as well as in the remainder of Brazil, is football. The Championship of Ceará has its main games in Fortaleza. There are several football clubs, such as Ceará SC, Fortaleza EC and Ferroviário AC. Strong winds make the Praia do Futuro an excellent place for nautical sports, and Fortaleza hosts world competitions of surfing, windsurfing and kitesurfing. Fortaleza has produced high-level athletes in combat sports, as evidenced by several Fortalezans' success in mixed martial arts.

Fortaleza was one of the host cities of the 2014 FIFA World Cup.

== Flag ==
The state flag of Ceará, is one of the national symbols. The background is identical to the Brazil flag, with the real difference in its coat of arms; has a polonium shield, which represents the strength and endurance of the state and the protective function. However, it is not only that, but also reveals the geography, fauna and flora, the example is the coast, the backlands, birds, the carnaúbas. It also has anthropological and cultural elements, such as the Mucuripe Lighthouse, the Golden Fortress, which shows not only the militarized past but also the people; the rafts, a kind of boat used by fishermen.

== See also ==
- Jericoacoara
- Canoa Quebrada
- Cumbuco
- Evolutionist Liberal Party of Ceará
- Sertão
- Northeast Region of Brazil
- João Inácio Júnior
- List of municipalities in Ceará
- Federative units of Brazil
- Cearadactylus
