= São Gonçalo do Amarante (disambiguation) =

Gundisalvus of Amarante is a Portuguese priest and hermit.

São Gonçalo do Amarante may also refer to:

- São Gonçalo do Amarante, Rio Grande do Norte, a municipality in Brazil
- São Gonçalo do Amarante, Ceará, a municipality in Brazil
