= Cascavel, Ceará =

Municipality in Ceará, Brazil

Coordinates: 4.13083°S 38.2358°W

Cascavel
- Municipality
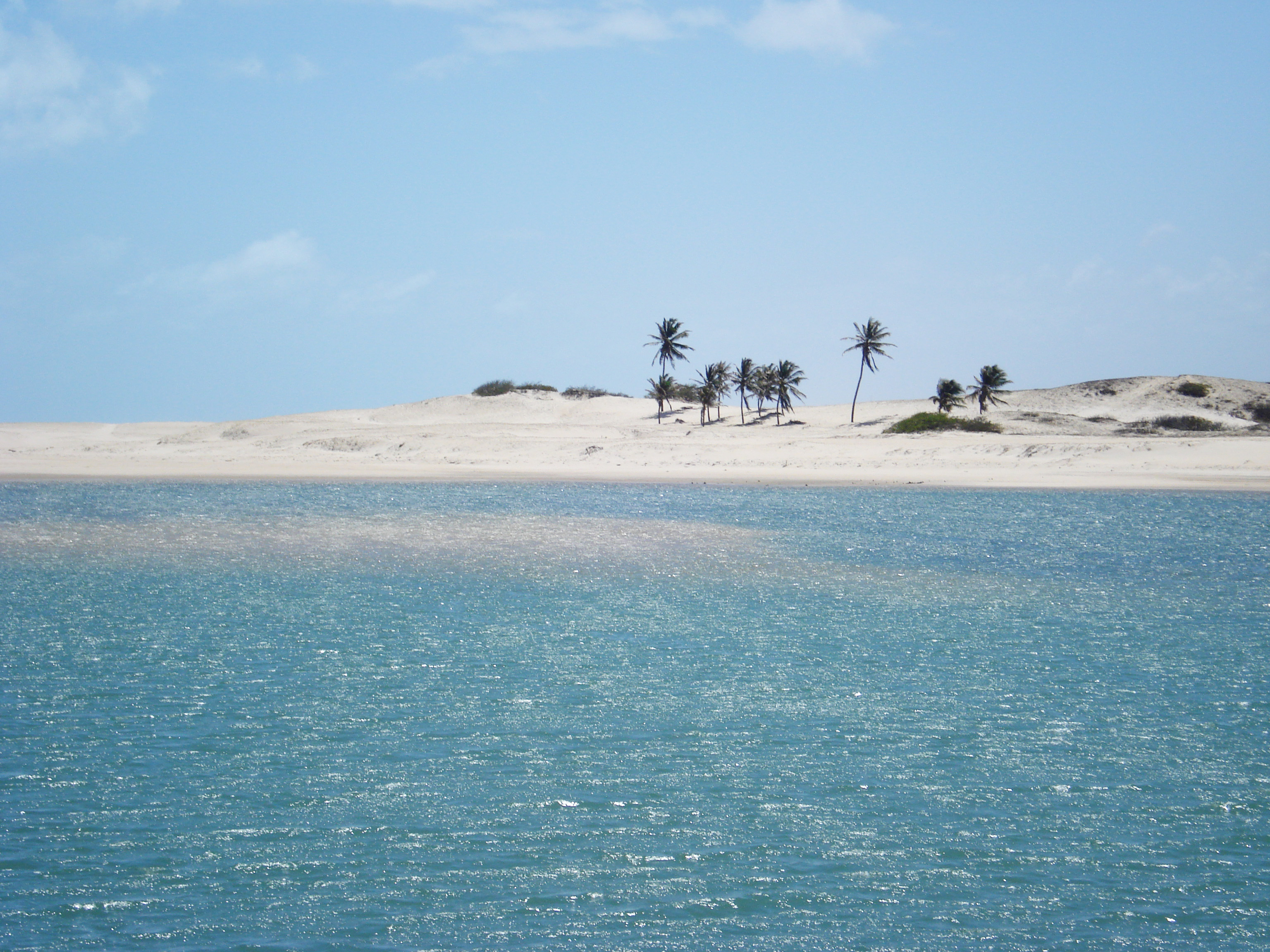
- Aguas Belas beach, in Cascavel.

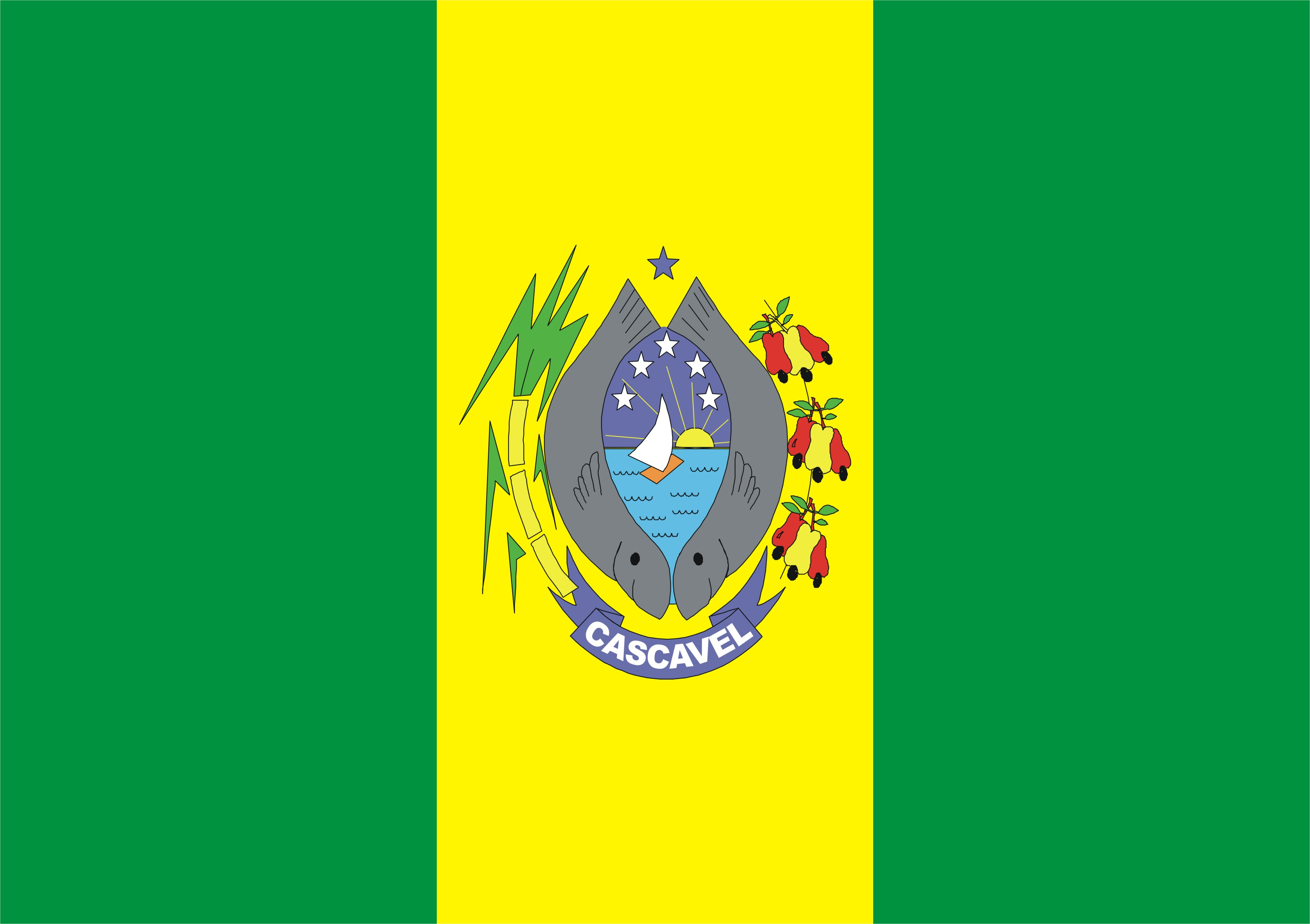
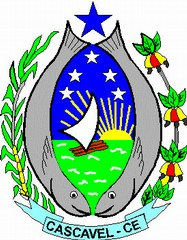
- Flag Coat of arms
- Interactive map of Cascavel
- Country: Brazil
- Region: Nordeste
- State: Ceará
- Mesoregion: Noroeste Cearense

Population (2020)
  - Total: 72,232
- Time zone: UTC−3 (BRT)

Cascavel is a municipality in the state of Ceará in the Northeast region of Brazil.

== See also ==
- List of municipalities in Ceará
