= Jeová Rafá Theological Institute =

Institution of higher education in Brazil

The Jeová Rafá Theological Institute (Portuguese: Instituto Teológico Jeová Rafá) is an independent non-denominational institution of higher education in Itapipoca, Ceará State (CE), in northeast Brazil. It is one of a significant number of Evangelical Christian educational institutions in Brazil offering theological qualifications primarily by distance learning. The institute offers online courses ranging from foundation, bachelors, masters, to doctoral degrees.

== History and accreditation ==
The Jeová Rafá Theological Institute, also known as ITEF, was founded in 2015 and is currently led by its director, Rev'd Dr Clesilvio de Castro Sousa. Its qualifications are recognised under Brazilian law as "free" (exempt) courses (or cursos livres in Portuguese) not requiring specific recognition by the MEC (Ministério da Educação), the Brazilian Ministry of Education. The laws regulating cursos livres apply to a wide range of vocational and distance learning courses. Examples include courses for languages, security, and IT. In the case of courses designated for the exercise of religious ministry and religious education the exempt qualifications are defined by the legal term interna corporis, or for 'in-house' use within a social entity, such as a church or seminary.
