= Itapipoca =

Municipality in Ceará, Brazil

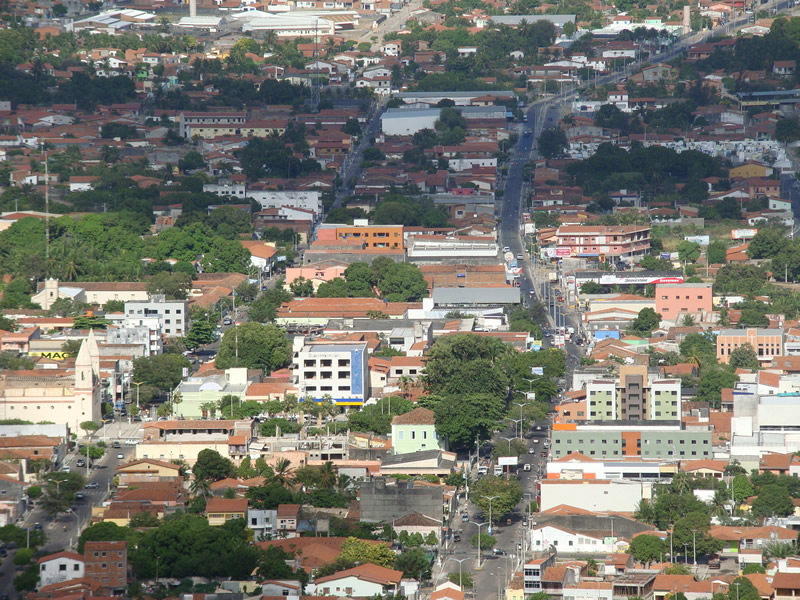
- Partial view of Itapipoca city center

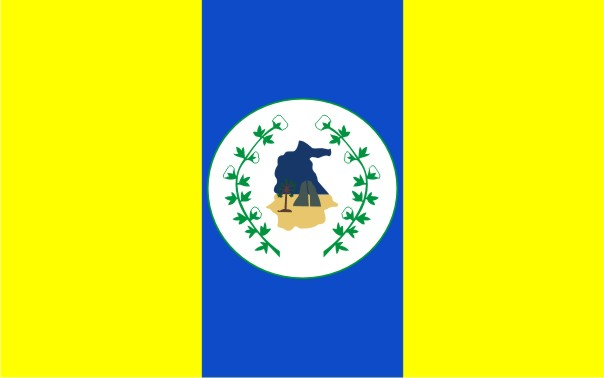
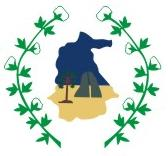
- Flag Coat of arms
- Nickname: Portuguese: Cidade dos Três Climas (The city of the three climates)
- Location in Ceará

- Location in Brazil
- Coordinates: 3°29′38″S 39°34′44″W
- Country: Brazil
- Region: Northeast
- State: Ceará
- Mesoregion: North of Ceará
- Microregion: Itapipoca
- Founded: February 3, 1823
- Incorporated (municipality): August 31, 1915

Government
  - Mayor: Dagmauro Sousa Moreira

Area
  - Total: 1,614.682 km^{2} (623.432 sq mi)
- Elevation: 109 m (358 ft)

Population (2022 Census)
  - Total: 131,123
  - Estimate (2025): 138,978
  - Density: 71.9/km^{2} (186/sq mi)
- Time zone: UTC−3 (BRT)
- CEP postal code: 62500-000
- Area code: 88
- HDI (2010): 0,640
- Website: www.itapipoca.ce.gov.br

Itapipoca is a city in Ceará, Brazil. It was founded in 1823.

== Education ==
=== Higher Education ===
- National University of Theology of Brazil (Portuguese: Universidade Nacional de Teologia do Brasil or UTEB)
- Jeová Rafá Theological Institute (Portuguese: Instituto Teológico Jeová Rafá)

== Notable people ==
- Tiririca - entertainer and politician
