= National University of Theology of Brazil =

Higher education institution in Brazil

The National University of Theology of Brazil (Portuguese: Universidade Nacional de Teologia do Brasil or UTEB) is a private non-denominational institution of higher education in Betânia, Itapipoca, Ceará State (CE), in northeast Brazil. UTEB is one of a significant number of independent Pentecostal and Evangelical Christian educational institutions in Brazil offering theological qualifications primarily by distance learning. UTEB offers online courses from introductory, diploma, foundation, bachelors, masters, to doctoral degrees in a range of areas within theology and religious studies.

== Accreditation ==
UTEB offers courses up to doctoral level in a range of theology and religious studies specialisms including systematic theology, Christian education, and biblical studies. The university's qualifications are recognised under Brazilian law as "free" (as in exempt) courses (or cursos livres in Portuguese) not requiring specific recognition by the MEC (Ministério da Educação), the Brazilian Ministry of Education, in common with a large number of similar institutions. The laws regulating cursos livres apply to a wide range of vocational and professional distance learning qualifications. Examples include courses for languages, security, and IT. In the case of courses designated for the exercise of religious ministry and religious education, the exempt qualifications are defined by the legal term interna corporis, or for 'in-house' use within a social entity, such as a church or seminary.
