= Caucaia =

Municipality in Ceará, Brazil

- Municipality
- The Municipality of Caucaia
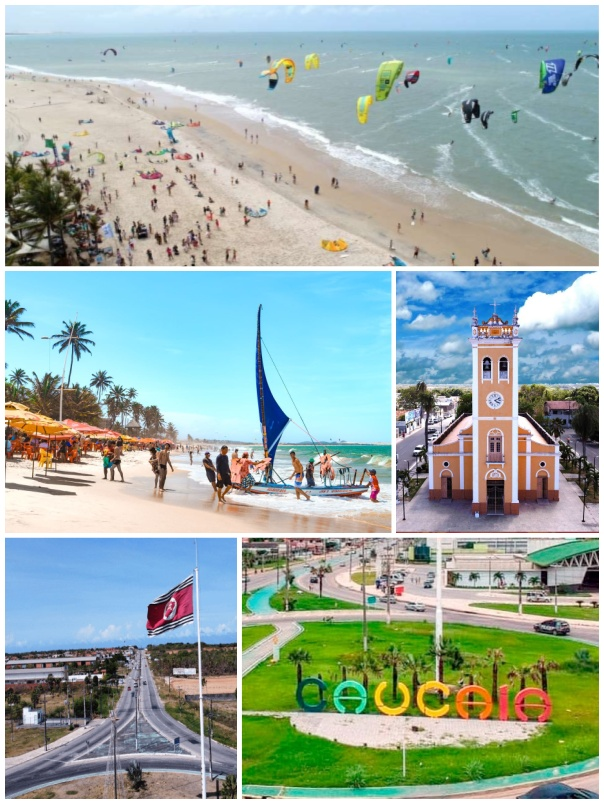
- Pictures of Caucaia

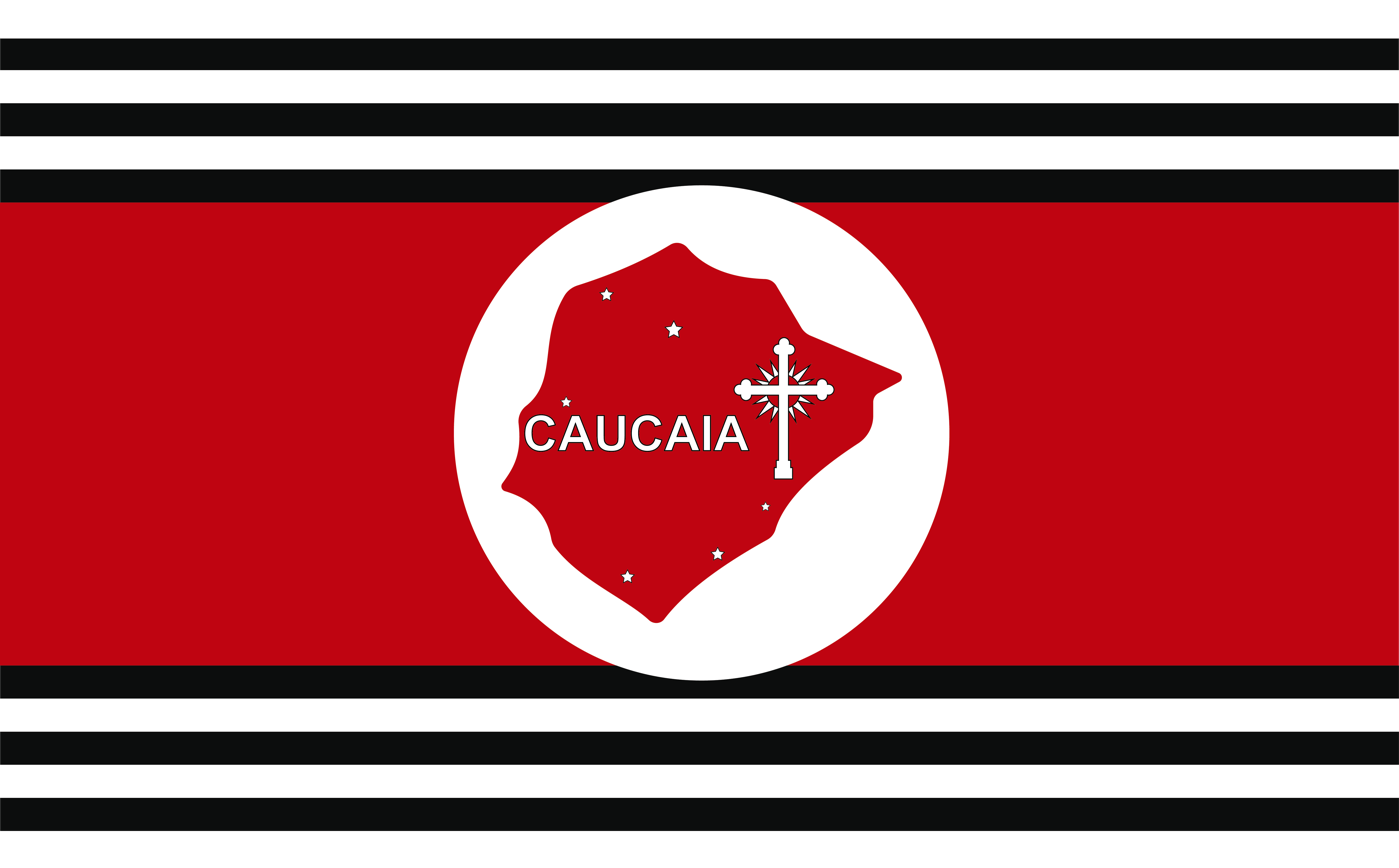
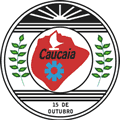
- Flag Seal
- Nickname: Caucaiense

- Location in Brazil
- Coordinates: 03°43′58″S 38°39′21″W
- Country: Brazil
- Region: Northeast
- State: Ceará
- Founded: October 15, 1759

Government
  - Mayor: Vitor Valim

Area
  - Total: 1,227.931 km^{2} (474.107 sq mi)
- Elevation: 29 m (95 ft)

Population (2025)
  - Total: 378,406
  - Density: 308.166/km^{2} (798.145/sq mi)
  - City/Settlement: 332,140
- Time zone: UTC−3 (BST)

Caucaia is a Brazilian municipality in the state of Ceará. As of 2025, it had a population of 378,406. It is home to the Tapeba tribe, a native group organized in 17 villages around the metropolitan region of Fortaleza. Caucaia has the second biggest GDP in Ceara state, thanks to the industries surrounding the port of Pecem, which attract several investors interested in installing offshore windfarms and desalination plants in the municipality.

== Geography ==
Caucaia is close to the capital city of Fortaleza and is home to a state garden park. There is a market in the center of the town with fish, fruits, and souvenirs for tourists. Caucaia can be reached by train that departs from the center of the city by the Feiras in downtown, as well as buses departing to and from the city through Rodoviarias (bus stations).

Caucaia has a diverse landscape, with beaches, hills and valleys. For nature lovers, popular sights for hiking are the Serra da Rajada and Serra do Jua.

== Main sights ==
Caucaia is a popular destination for kitesurfing, as it has an extensive coastline suitable for the practice of diverse aquatic sports and good weather conditions throughout the whole year, being the season between July and November the windiest. The beach of Cumbuco and the Cauipe lagoon are the hotspots of kitesurfers. March and April are known as swell season, therefore many surfers go to Icarai beach in search of good waves.

At the center of the city sits a church. Masses are held throughout the week and many of the local people walk around the square at night. There are stalls with cheap "bon bons" (little candies) and other treats.

Caucaia has a museum of Cashew where visitors can appreciate local handcraft art and cuisine.
