= Evolutionist Liberal Party of Ceará =

Defunct Brazilian political party

Evolutionist Liberal Party of Ceará (Portuguese: Partido Liberal Evolucionista do Ceará) was a political party in Ceará, Brazil. The party contested the October 14, 1934, elections to the Federal Chamber and the Ceará Constituent Assembly. The party nominated 11 candidates for the federal election and 30 candidates for the state assembly. One of the party's 30 state election candidates was Adilia de Albuquerque Moraes, one of five female candidates in the fray. Albuquerque contested on the slogan "For the defence of women". None of its candidates was elected.
