= Port of Pecém =

Port in the state of Ceará, Brazil

Coordinates: 3°32′48″S 38°49′53″W

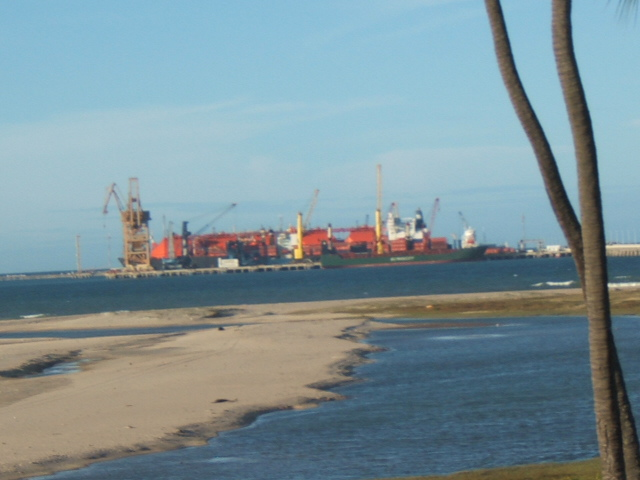
A ship in the port of Pecem.

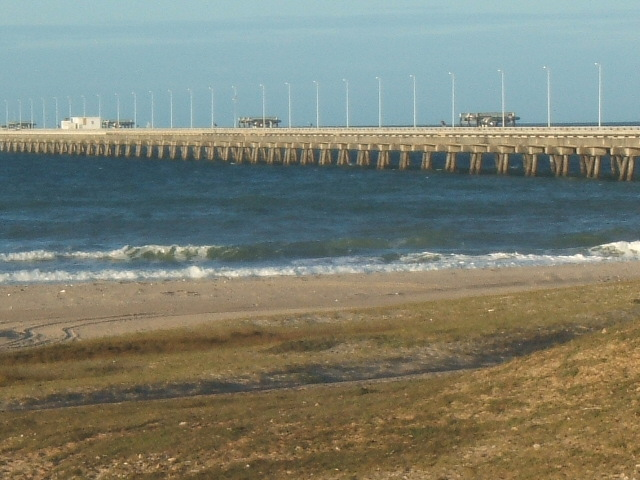
The transportation bridge of the port of Pecem.

The Port of Pecém is one of the two big ports in the state of Ceará, in Brazil. It's located in the municipality of São Gonçalo do Amarante.

In the year of 2025 the port handled 20.9 million metric tons of cargo, representing an increase of 7% over the previous year.
