= São Gonçalo do Amarante, Ceará =

Municipality in Ceará, Brazil

Coordinates: 3°36′21″S 38°58′08″W

São Gonçalo do Amarante
- Municipality
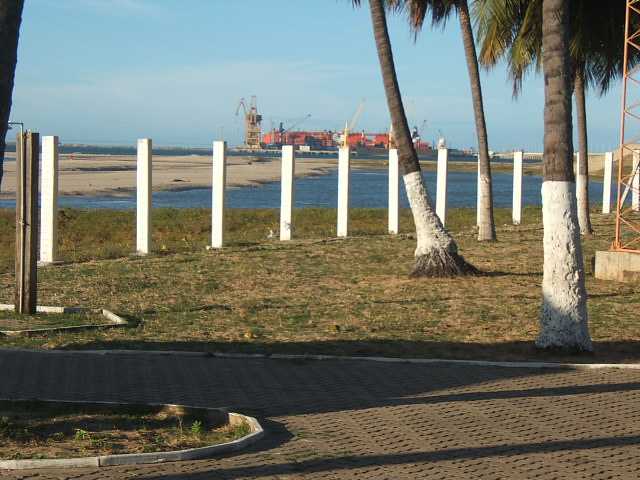

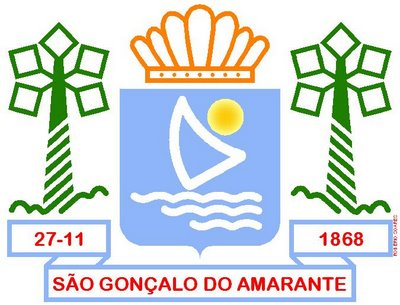
- Flag Coat of arms
- Interactive map of São Gonçalo do Amarante
- Country: Brazil
- Region: Nordeste
- State: Ceará
- Mesoregion: Noroeste Cearense

Population (2020)
  - Total: 48,869
- Time zone: UTC−3 (BRT)

São Gonçalo do Amarante, Ceará is a municipality in the state of Ceará in the Northeast region of Brazil.

In this municipality is located the Port of Pecem, one of the two big ports of the state of Ceará.

== See also ==
- List of municipalities in Ceará
