= Martim Soares Moreno =

Portuguese explorer

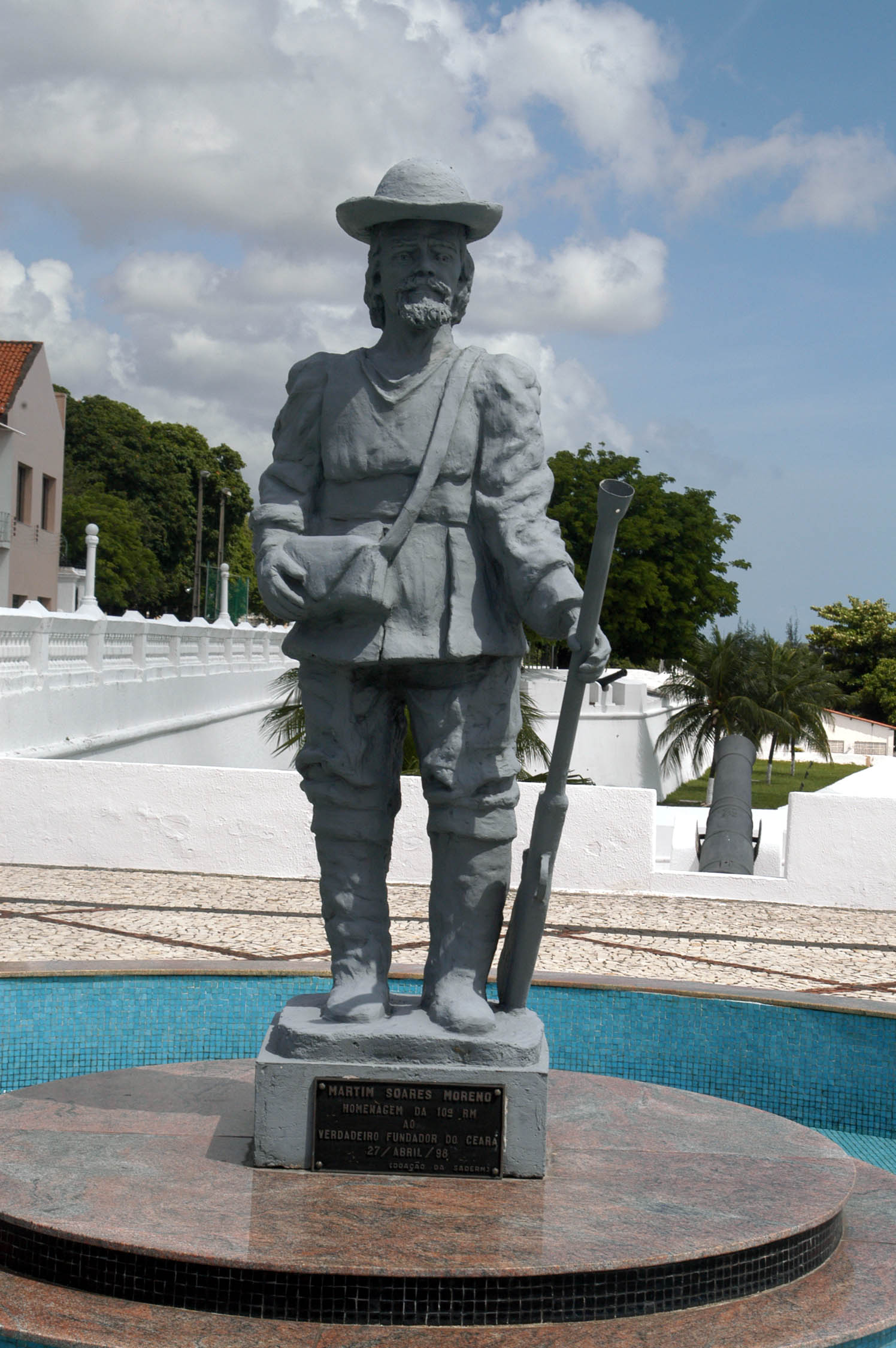

Captain-major of Ceará
- In office 1611–1613
- Monarch: Philip II of Portugal
- Preceded by: Pero Coelho de Sousa
- Succeeded by: Manuel de Brito Freire

Captain-major of Ceará
- In office 1621–1631
- Monarch: Philip III of Portugal
- Preceded by: Manuel de Brito Freire
- Succeeded by: Domingos da Veiga Cabral

Personal details
- Born: c. 1586 Santiago do Cacém, Kingdom of Portugal
- Died: After 1648 Kingdom of Portugal
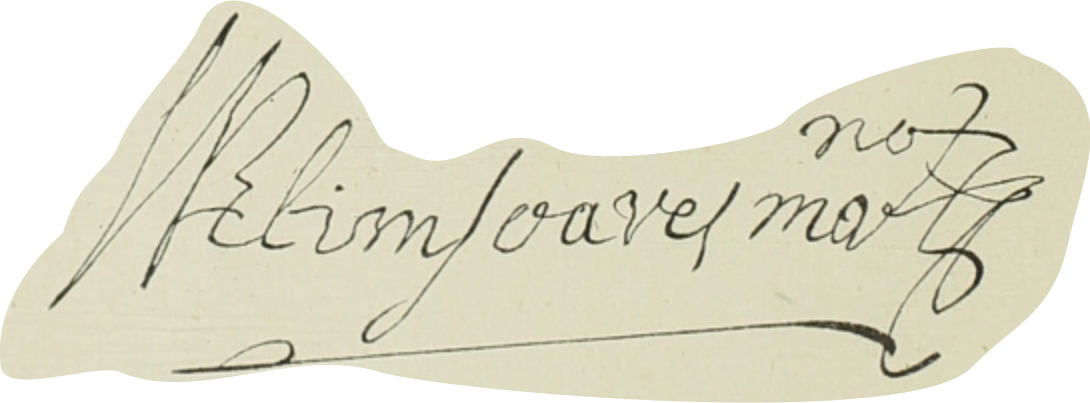
- Signature

Military service
- Allegiance: Portuguese Empire
- Battles/wars: Dutch-Portuguese War

Martim Soares Moreno, born around 1586 in Santiago do Cacém, Kingdom of Portugal, was a Portuguese explorer who defended the interests of the Portuguese crown in the colony of Brazil, fighting French pirates and Dutch invaders during decades.

His uncle, Diogo de Campos Moreno says that "he was sent very young with Pêro Coelho de Sousa, so that while serving in that expedition he could learn the language of the Indians, and their customs, devoting himself to them, and making himself very familiar, and a relative or friend to them, as they say." He participated in the Pêro Coelho expedition to Ceará in 1603 and ended up becoming, years later (1612), the virtual founder of that colony. There he built, on the river Ceará, a fort and a chapel, with the help of the Indians that he brought from Rio Grande do Norte.

That same year, on the orders of Jerónimo de Albuquerque Maranhão, he reconnoitered Maranhão, occupied by the French, who had stirred up the people of that land. On his return, however, his ship was driven by the wind to the Antilles. In 1614 he was in Seville, in Spain.

The next year, now a captain, he returned to Maranhão, together with reinforcements of 900 men, which made possible the definitive expulsion of the French and the capture of the city of São Luís. In 1616 he was captured on the high seas by a French Corsair, after a violent battle that left him seriously wounded with a cut on the face and the loss of a hand.

The charter letter of May 26, 1619 made him lord of the captaincy of Ceará, in thanks for his services. There, in 1624 and 1625, he repelled the attacks of two Dutch ships.

In 1630 he dedicated himself to fighting the Dutch invasion of Pernambuco. He left Ceará with a few Indians and soldiers and arrived at the Arraial do Bom Jesus in June 1631. In the initial phase of the fight, he took part in the blockade of the Dutch forces in Recife and Olinda. He always distinguished himself, as a combatant and interpreter with the Indians. In subsequent years he took part in the defense of Paraíba and of Cunhaú (in Rio Grande do Norte).

The Dutch having defeated the Portuguese colonial resistance, and the Portuguese Monarchy having been restored in 1640, a truce was signed between Portugal and the Netherlands. Nevertheless, in 1645, Martim Soares Moreno took part in the clandestine movement that ended with the expulsion of the Dutch from Brazilian territory.

== In culture ==
His life served as the historical basis for José de Alencar's novel Iracema.
