= Rail transport in Brazil =

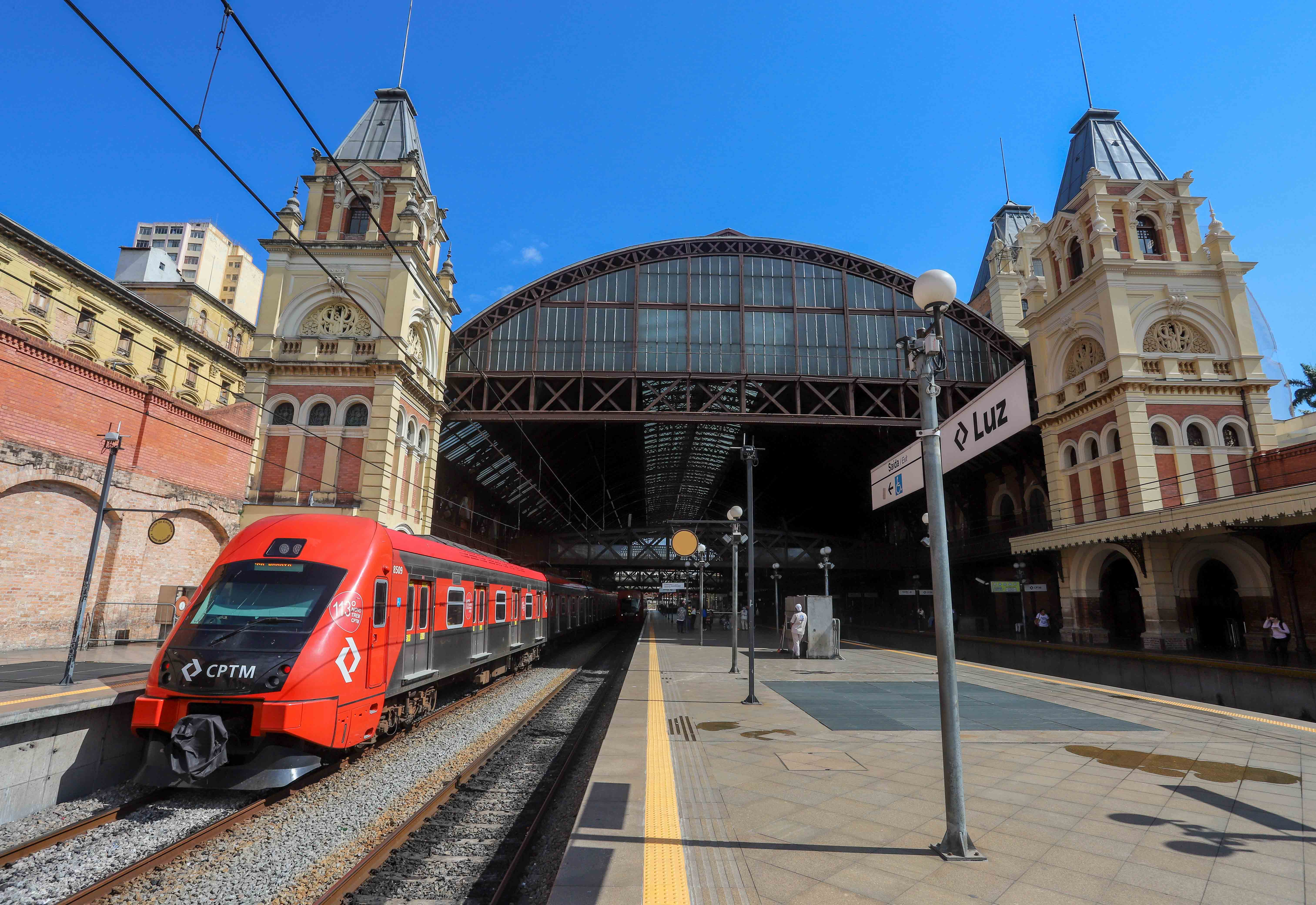
- Train at Luz Station, São Paulo

Operation
- Infrastructure company: Infra S.A.
- Major operators: Rumo Logística, MRS Logística, Vale S.A., VLI Multimodal S.A., CBTU, CPTM

Statistics
- Ridership: 2.48 billion (2023)

System length
- Total: 30,576 km (18,999 mi) (2015)
- Freight only: 29,074 km (18,066 mi) (2022)

Track gauge
- Metre gauge 1,000 mm (3 ft 3 3/8 in): 22,539 km (14,005 mi)
- Irish gauge 1,600 mm (5 ft 3 in): 7,432 km (4,618 mi)
- Dual gauge 1,600 mm (5 ft 3 in) and 1,000 mm (3 ft 3 3/8 in): 514 km (319 mi)

Electrification
- 3 kV DC: 1,121 km (697 mi)

Features
- Longest tunnel: Tunelão, 8.645 km (5.372 mi)
- No. of stations: 631 (2023)
Map
- Brazilian railway network in 2016

Rail transport in Brazil began in the 19th century and there were many different railway companies. The railways were nationalized under RFFSA (Rede Ferroviária Federal, Sociedade Anônima) in 1957. Between 1999 and 2007, RFFSA was broken up and services are now operated by a variety of private and public operators, including Rumo Logística, Companhia Paulista de Trens Metropolitanos and SuperVia. The government retains ownership of the infrastructure, with freight rail operations and maintenance of associated infrastructure tendered out to private companies on thirty-year concessions.

Oficial Brazilian Government Document showing and explaining intentions and History Summary of Current Situation of Rail in Country

Most railways in Brazil are for freight transportation or urban passenger transportation. Only two inter-city passenger railways survive: the Carajás Railway (connecting Pará and Maranhão) and the Vitória-Minas Railway (connecting Espírito Santo and Minas Gerais), both operated by Vale S.A.

== Track gauge ==
The rail system in Brazil operates on three rail gauges:

- Broad gauge: 4,932 kilometres (3,065 mi) 1,600 mm (5 ft 3 in) gauge
- Metre gauge: 23,773 kilometres (14,772 mi) 1,000 mm (3 ft 3 3/8 in) gauge
- Standard gauge: 202.4 kilometres (125.8 mi) 1,435 mm (4 ft 8 1/2 in) gauge:
  - Used on lines 4, 5, and 6 of the São Paulo Metro and the Salvador Metro so that they can use "off the shelf" equipment.
  - Estrada de Ferro do Amapá in the middle of the Amazon rainforest also used standard gauge.
- Dual gauge: 396 kilometres (246 mi) 1,000 mm (3 ft 3 3/8 in) and 1,600 mm (5 ft 3 in) gauges (three rails) (1999 est.)
- Total: 29,303 kilometres (18,208 mi) (1,520 kilometres (940 mi) electrified).

A 12 km section of the former 2 ft 6 in (762 mm) gauge Estrada de Ferro Oeste de Minas is retained as a heritage railway.

== Rapid transit and light rail ==
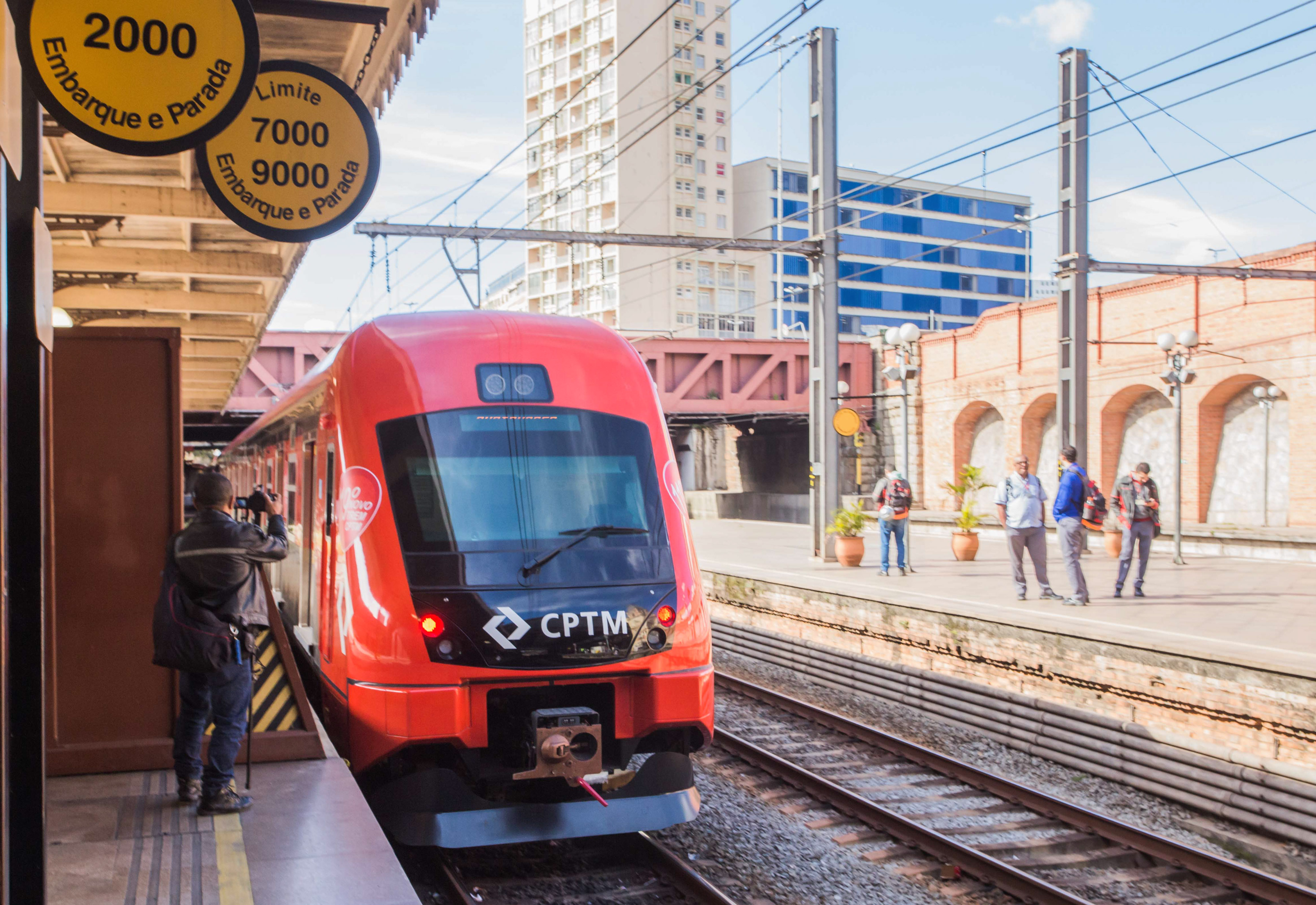
Regional rail system in São Paulo

Metros operating and under construction:

- Belo Horizonte Metro
- Federal District Metro
- Fortaleza Metro
- Porto Alegre Metro
- Recife Metro
- Rio de Janeiro Metro (Rio de Janeiro Metropolitan Area)
- Salvador Metro
- São Paulo Metro (São Paulo Metropolitan Area)

Light rail (VLT) and interurban systems operating and under construction:

- Baixada Santista Light Rail
- VLT do Cairi
- Sistema de Trens Urbanos de João Pessoa
- Maceió Urban Rail
- Rio de Janeiro Light Rail
- Sistema de Trens Urbanos de Natal
- Teresina Metro

== Tramways and light rail ==
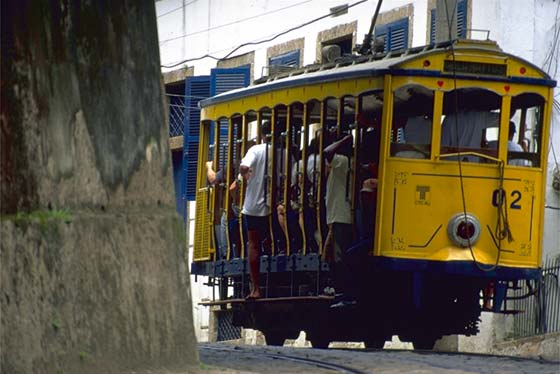
Santa Teresa Tram in Rio de Janeiro

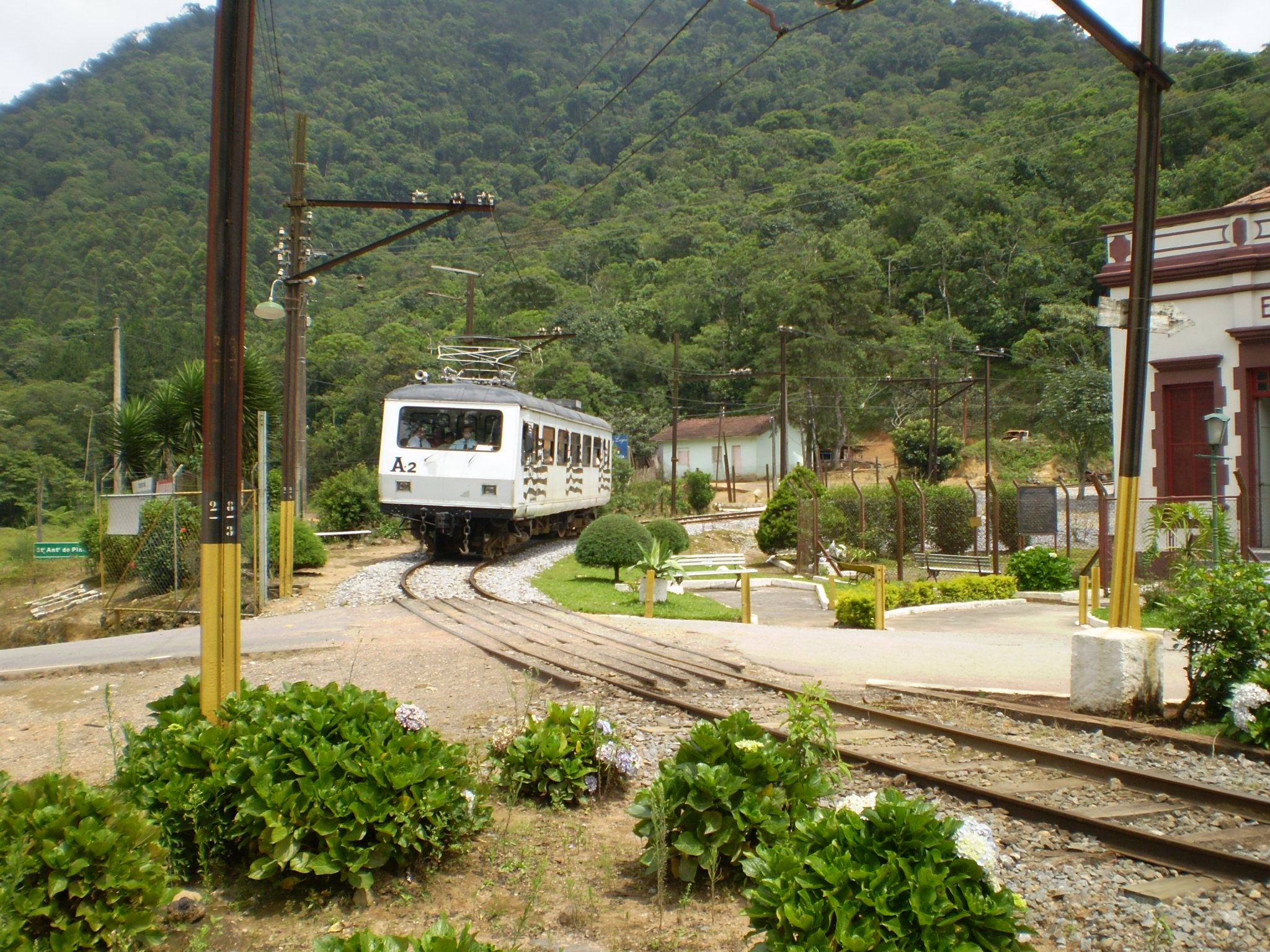
Interurban tramway in Campos do Jordão

Steam-powered, horse-drawn and electric tramways operated in Brazil from 1859 until 1989, new systems were introduced in the 1980s and 90s in Rio de Janeiro and Campinas with no success, nevertheless, that may change soon as studies are being conducted to introduce tramway systems in Goiânia, and Curitiba now plans a light metro to replace bus rapid transit (BRT) in a major corridor, and in Cariri, the Cariri MetroTram that will run between Crato and Juazeiro do Norte is under construction.

- List of light rail transport (LRT) or tramway systems in Brazil:
- VLT Carioca in Rio de Janeiro, Rio de Janeiro
- Salvador LRT in Salvador, Bahia
- Baixada Santista LRT, between Santos and São Vicente, São Paulo
- VLT de Sobral in Sobral, Ceará
- VLT de Maceió in Maceió, Alagoas
- VLT do Cariri in Juazeiro do Norte, Ceará
- VLT de Fortaleza in Fortaleza, Ceará
- VLT do Distrito Federal in the Federal District (Brasília)
- VLT de Cuiabá in Cuiabá, Mato Grosso

== Passenger Rail ==
=== Intercity trains ===
Although Brazil has one of the largest rail networks, it lacks passenger transportation. Passenger trains were controlled by state-run companies until a mass privatization occurred in 1996–1999. By then, most tracks and rolling stock were in a very poor condition and most trains would not run over 60 km/h even on broad gauge, forcing the now private-run railway companies to shut down almost every single regional and long-distance service in the entire country in the next 5 years. The situation remains the same as of 2025.

The state of São Paulo used to have an extensive network of long-distance rail running on electrified and mostly rectified tracks, with specifically designed broad-gauge sections in the 1970s built for 160km/h electric train operation. The number of passengers from 1980s dwindled, due to lack of funds, the economic crisis at the end of the military dictatorship era in Brazil, lack of interest from the new governments in railway investment, and several design flaws that were never corrected, mainly:

- Severely limited capacity north of São Paulo: The line between São Paulo and Campinas was double-track, but never triple or quad-tracked, which meant that faster trains were incapable of overtaking the ever increasing frequency of stopping commuter trains on Line 7 of São Paulo commuter rail network, which increased journey times between São Paulo and Campinas from 1h 15min to almost 3h. Further connections north of Campinas suffered from poor railway maintenance and winding tracks through the dense urban aglomeration, with electric trains being capable of reaching 120km/h+ only in more sparsely populated sections north of Rio Claro, from where the electrified tracks did not go much further, requiring extra time necessary to swap for slower diesel locomotives, bringing the whole average journey times down.
- Lack of suitable rolling stock: Most of the passenger train compositions were made with 1930s to 1940s built V8 electric locomotives which suffered from high maintenance due to their age, and a small amount of relatively modern 1950s Budd passenger cars amongst many old passengers cars (many still wooden-built). Diesel locomotives were mostly designed for freight, with maximum speeds of rarely more than 90km/h (which could only be achieved in the unelectrified São Paulo-Rio line), and slow acceleration. During the late 1970s modern DMUs were got from Hungary which were a great improvement in terms of comfort, technology, and speed (140km/h), and were meant to be used on São Paulo-Rio connections to achieve record average speeds in connecting both capitals in 6h. But due to unpredicted design mismatches due to the terrain those trains were designed to run (in mostly flat Hungary), meant that it did not have enough torque to climb the Serra do Mar mountains, and they were repurposed for connections North of São Paulo, which suffered greatly from the above-mentioned point.
- Mixed gauge: São Paulo had a decently sized broad-gauge network, but most of the network was narrow-gauge. For example, the metre-gauge Mogiana line, which was the most important narrow-gauge line in the state and amongst the main railways in Brazil, had passenger services begin in Campinas and continue all the way to the country capital of Brasilia. Although this railway was partly electrified and mostly rectified, with curve radius that theoretically could achieve over 120km/h, the nature of metre-gauge and lack of suitable higher-speed capable narrow-gauge rolling stock meant that it could still not compete in speed with the connections between Campinas, Ribeirao Preto, Uberaba, Uberlandia and Brasilia, the problem was further aggravated due to the need to switch trains in Campinas, which already took too long to travel from São Paulo due to the previously mentioned bottleneck.

These reasons, amongst others, meant that after privatization, the newly formed operators were not interested in the vast amounts of investment that would be required to make the passenger lines profitable.

Currently the country's rail network is almost entirely used for heavy freight transport only, all of the electrification of routes which were used for intercity passenger trains in broad gauge lines in São Paulo (state) are completely dismantled, as well as most of the train stations that are now in ruins (some were refurbished and are used as museums, government facilities and other purposes). Much of the dual-track lines are also abandoned, with trains making use of only one track now, the vast majority of which are in a very poor state of maintenance, running at very slow speeds. The lines and branch lines which were used for passenger only, which were not profitable for current private operators, and are now completely abandoned. Brazil today has only a few heritage railways and two long-distance trains operated by Vale on narrow gauge that are mainly used of a tourist attraction due to the scenic journey rather than a transportation system, especially due to the slow operating speed (60 km/h maximum), making Brazil's land rail public transportation infrastructure one of the worst and slowest, in average speed, in the world.

=== Rapid-transit and commuter ===
São Paulo and Rio de Janeiro both have extensive rapid transit and commuter train routes. Although there may be discussed that they are much less than it should be for cities with their proportions, both systems are almost fully electrified and mostly have modern air-conditioned EMUs. Both systems are in constant expansion, but São Paulo is growing much faster, with currently 6 projects of subway and commuter lines being applied (3 in construction and 3 in advanced planning).

Apart from the large systems in Rio and São Paulo, the further cities in Brazil with smaller commuter train systems include the Cariri region, João Pessoa, Maceió, Natal, and Teresina. The other Brazilian metro systems are the Belo Horizonte Metro, Federal District Metro, Fortaleza Metro, Porto Alegre Metro, Recife Metro and Salvador Metro.

== Future developments ==
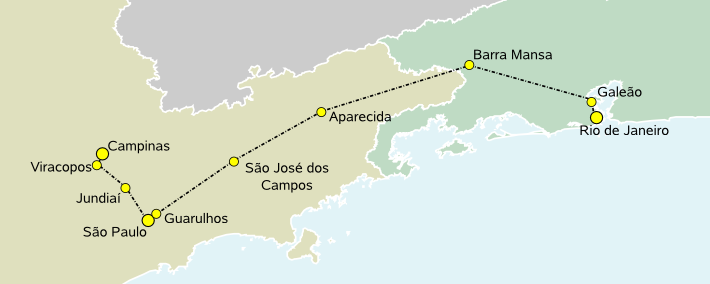
Rio–São Paulo High-speed rail

In the light of the problems with the lack of intercity passenger rail transportation, there are many projects to reinstall fast passenger trains back to Brazil, although all of them are on halt due to the current political and financial crisis.

=== High-speed rail ===
In September 2008, Brazil's Transportation Ministry announced a high-speed train project for the world cup connecting São Paulo, Rio de Janeiro and Campinas. This would cost US$15 billion. These lines will use 1,435 mm (4 ft 8 1/2 in) standard gauge.

The current financial crisis has put this high-speed project on complete halt, and has no prediction on when it will be resumed.

=== Regional Trains in São Paulo ===
In 2010, São Paulo state government showed off a project to build up 4 regional intercity trains routes connecting the area surrounding São Paulo with high population cities close by, which today rely exclusively on intercity buses that are almost completely saturated and running at very short intervals at full capacity. The original plan was for construction to start 2013–2014, but the Brazilian financial crisis that it is suffering since 2015 has put all projects on standby, and the next prediction is for construction to start only by 2025.

=== International link ===
On 23 August 2008, Argentina, Brazil, and Venezuela agreed to develop an electrified long-distance passenger railway link between these countries. A minor hurdle is the use of both 50 Hz and 60 Hz railway electrification systems. There is also a confusion of gauges (3 gauges of 1435mm, 1600mm and 1676mm) to overcome.

=== New freight line ===
A new metre gauge line from Maracaju via Cascavel to Paranaguá for agricultural products is proposed.

=== Ferrogrão railway ===
A new north–south (1600mm gauge) line is planned, known as EF-170 and separate from the rest of the network, between Sinop in Mato Grosso state and the inland port of Miritituba in Pará state on the River Tapajós, first phase 933km. The line is expected to be used primarily for moving export grain and soy products from Mato Grosso state, but it would also carry fertilizer, sugar, ethanol and petroleum products: this traffic is currently carried on the BR163 trunk road.

== Railway links with adjacent countries ==
Country	Location	Line	Gauge	Brazilian Gauge	Line	Location
Argentina	Paso de los Libres	Urquiza	1,435 mm (4 ft 8 1/2 in)	1,000 mm (3 ft 3 3/8 in)	unknown	Uruguaiana
Bolivia	Puerto Suárez	unknown	1,000 mm (3 ft 3 3/8 in)	1,000 mm (3 ft 3 3/8 in)	E.F. NOB	Corumbá
Uruguay	Rivera	Linea Rivera	1,435 mm (4 ft 8 1/2 in)	1,000 mm (3 ft 3 3/8 in)	unknown	Santana do Livramento
Uruguay	Rio Branco	Linea Rio Branco	1,435 mm (4 ft 8 1/2 in)	1,000 mm (3 ft 3 3/8 in)	unknown	Jaguarão

== Heaviest trains ==
Brazil has some of the heaviest iron ore trains in the world, and these run on the metre gauge track of the EFVM railway, these trains are pulled by a fleet of specially built locomotives that utilize 4-axle trucks or two pairs of 2-axle trucks with span bolsters. The first model of locomotive built specially for this duty was the DDM45, created by EMD in 1970. 83 examples were delivered to the EFVM. Later, in the early 1990s the EFVM also ordered BB40-8M models from General Electric and continues to order further BB40-9W models, also from GE.

However, a major power shortage occurred in 2002 across the Brazilian narrow-gauge systems. As new locomotives would be too expensive for many railways, or would take too long to be delivered for others, the solution was to buy second-hand standard gauge locomotives and fit them with new metre-gauge bogies. The number of axles was increased due to limitations with tractive effort output from the smaller metre-gauge traction motors. The dual-truck axle conversion was fairly expensive, so not all railways could afford it; some, such as ALL (América Latina Logística) retained the original trucks, narrowing them to fit the new gauge and fitting smaller traction motors. Additional issues arose with the extra axles, primarily due to the increased length of locomotives creating excessive drawbar swing, causing some derailments on tighter curves.

== History ==
From the 1930s to the 1970s, the railways were the main way to transport agricultural product from the rural farms to the ports. However, the different gauges, owners and severed connections between multiple networks lead to the abandonment of much of the rail network, being replaced with highways.

=== Predecessors ===
The first incentive to start building a rail network in Brazil occurred in 1828, when the then imperial government incentivized the building of all transport roads. The first significant try to build a railway was the founding on an Anglo-Brazilian company in Rio de Janeiro in 1832, which planned to connect the city of Porto Feliz to the port of Santos. The government, however, did not support the project and so it did not progress any further.

Three years later, in 1835, the regent Diogo Antônio Feijó passed the Imperial Law n.º 101, which conceded privileges for 40 years to whoever built railways connecting Rio de Janeiro to the capitals of Minas Gerais, Rio Grande do Sul, and Bahia. Even with the incentives in place, no investor risked starting the project, as there was no guarantee that this railway would be profitable. Some groups did study the possibility of building this railway and its profitability, including another group of English and Brazilian investors, but none of them actually started building the infrastructure.

On 26 July 1852, Law 641, which gave advantages like a 90-year guarantee of a 33 km exclusion zone, the right to desapropriate any land that was "in the way", and a tax break for the import of railway material. However, it also came with an 8% limit to all dividends. With a revision of interest rate from 5% to 12%, the interest in building railways in Brazil spiked across the world, mainly in England, which was the main force behind the early construction efforts.

=== First railways ===
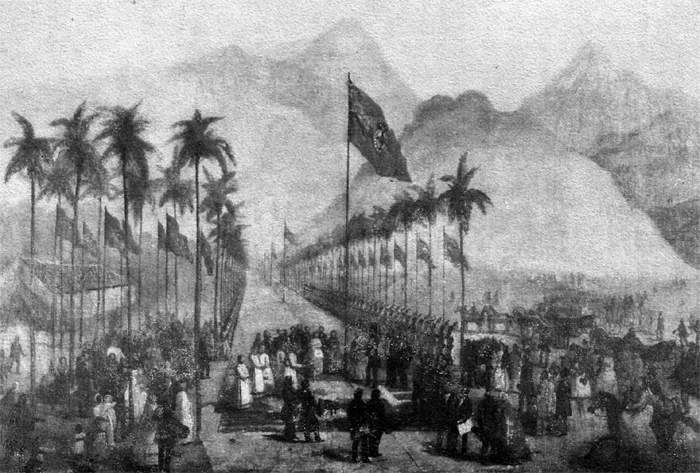
Placing of the fundamental stone of the Estrada de Ferro Mauá, on 30 April 1854. The event had the presence of many Brazilian authorities, including Dom Pedro II.

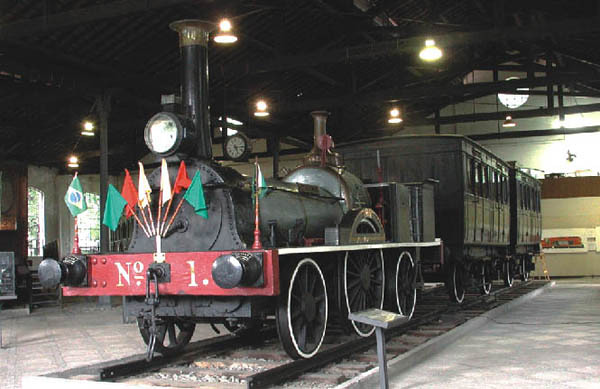
The first Brazilian locomotive, Baroneza, today being exhibited in the Museu do Trem, Engenho de Dentro, in Rio de Janeiro, with 174 years, is unique all over the world from manufacturer William Fairbairn & Sons

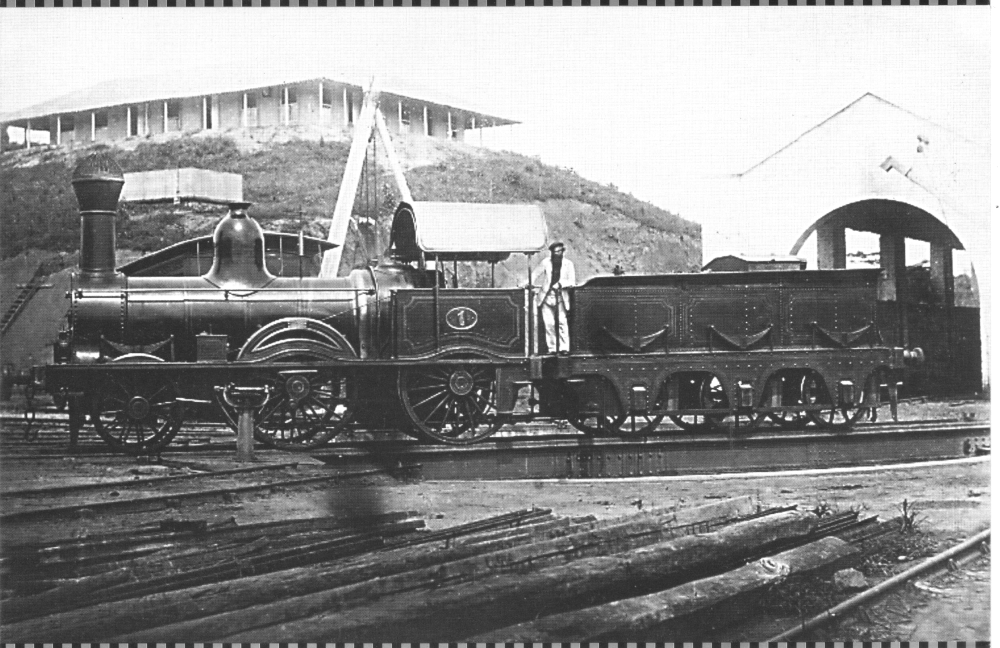
The first locomotive of the Recife and São Francisco Railway Company, the second oldest Brazilian railway.

Some time before the enacting of Law 641, the banker Irineu Evangelista de Souza requested permission to build a railway connecting the Port of Mauá, in the Bay of Guanabara, to Raiz da Serra. This railway became effectively the first-ever Brazilian railway, being inaugurated on 30 April 1854, with only 14.5 km (9.0 mi) of 5 ft 6 in (1,676 mm) track. Irineu's company, Imperial Companhia de Navegação a Vapor - Estrada de Ferro Petrópolis ("Imperial Steam Navigation Company - Petropolis Railroad"), realized the first port-railway operation in Brazil, transporting cargo from the ship Praça XV to Raiz da Serra. The Mauá Railway had little value besides its political and symbolic values, however. Mauá directly and indirectly participated in the building of nine other railways in Brazil.

The first section of the Recife and São Francisco Railway Company, which had 31 km (19 mi) between Cinco Pontas in Recife and the vila do Cabo, opened to regular traffic on 8 February 1858. This was the second-ever railway in Brazil, being managed by the first British company that settled in Brazil. The planned construction was only finished in 1862, due to delays caused by a variety of problems.

The first stretch of the Companhia Estrada de Ferro D. Pedro II ("Dom Pedro II Railroad Company") was opened on 29 March 1858, with the 47.21 km (29.33 mi) connection between the Estação da Corte and Queimados, in Rio de Janeiro. Later, with the proclamation of the republic, this railway was renamed the Estrada de Ferro Central do Brasil ("Central Brazil Railroad"), which was one of the main axis of connection between Rio de Janeiro and São Paulo in 1877, when the Estrada de Ferro Dom Pedro II connected to the Estrada de Ferro São Paulo.

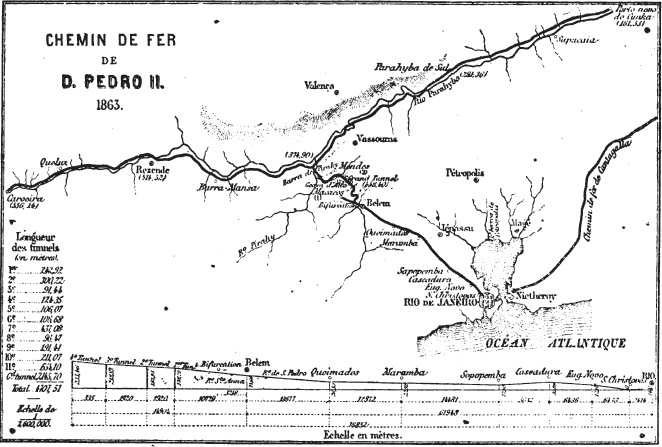
Estrada de Ferro Dom Pedro II (1863)

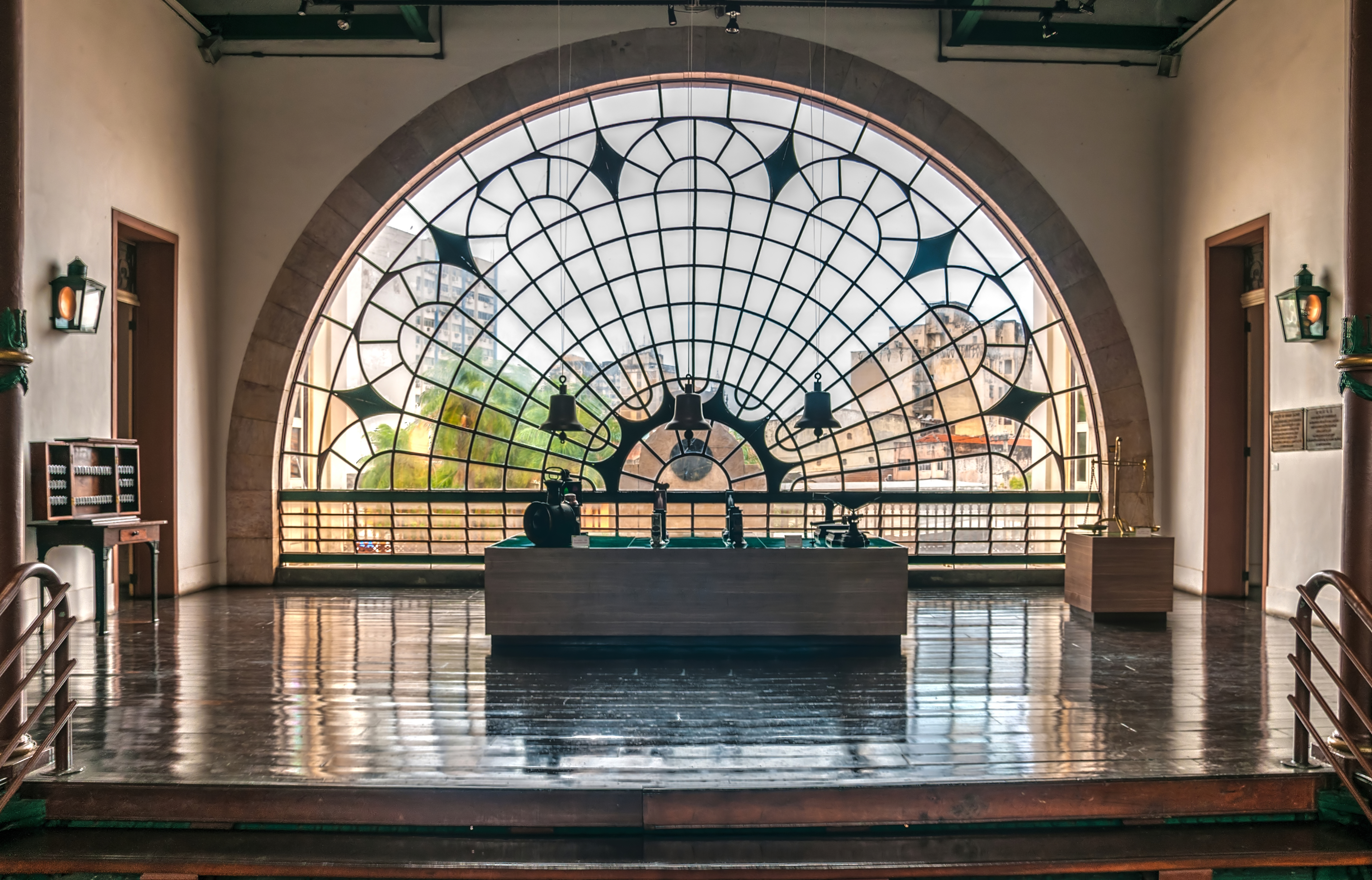
Recife was the first city in the world to operate steam locomotives specially designed to run in the roads: the so-called "maxambomba" was inaugurated in 1867.

In 1867, São Paulo Railway Ltd was founded: the first railway built in the state of São Paulo, connecting the Port of Santos with the coffee farms.

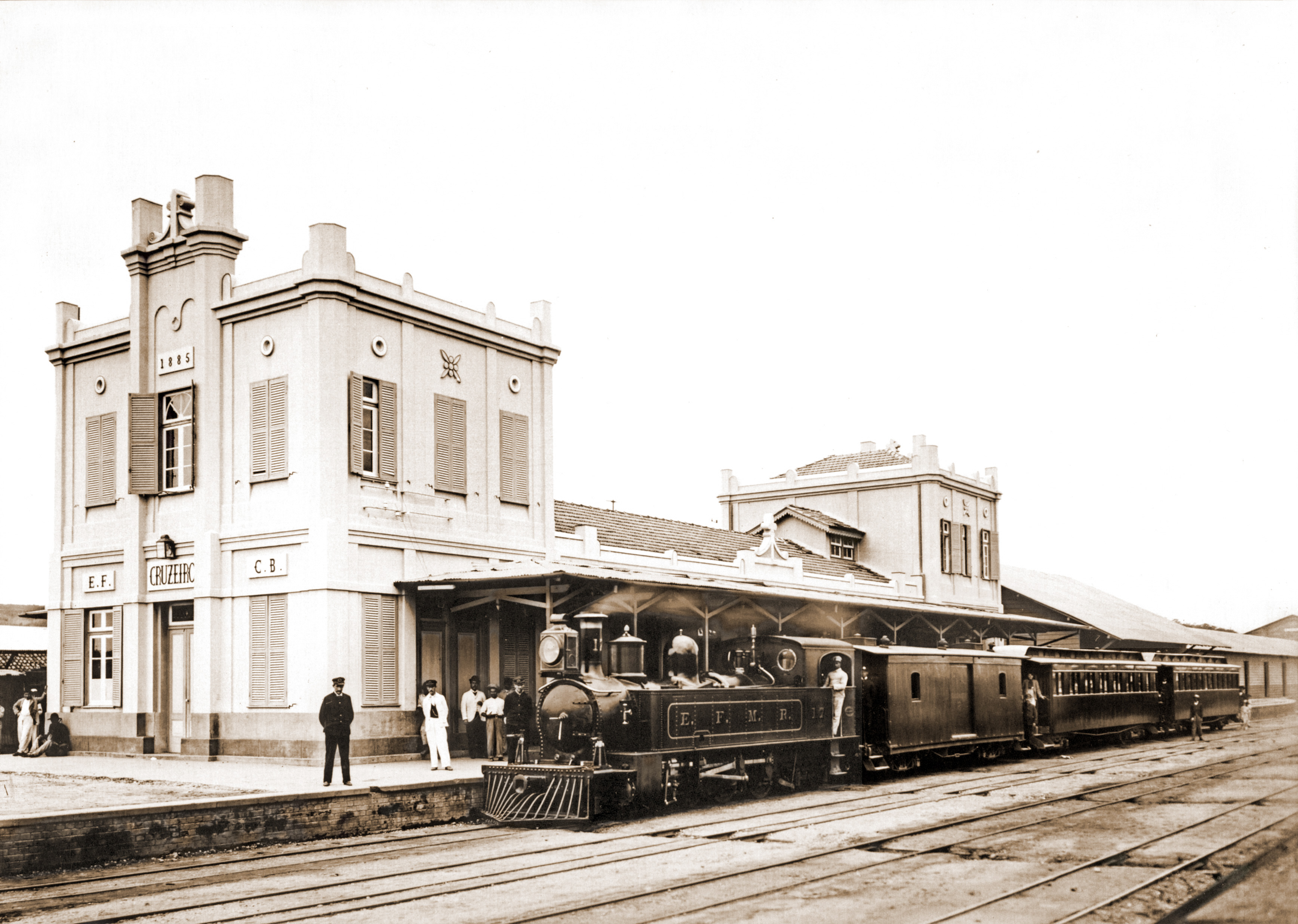
Station in Cruzeiro (SP), part of the Estrada de Ferro Minas e Rio. (1885)

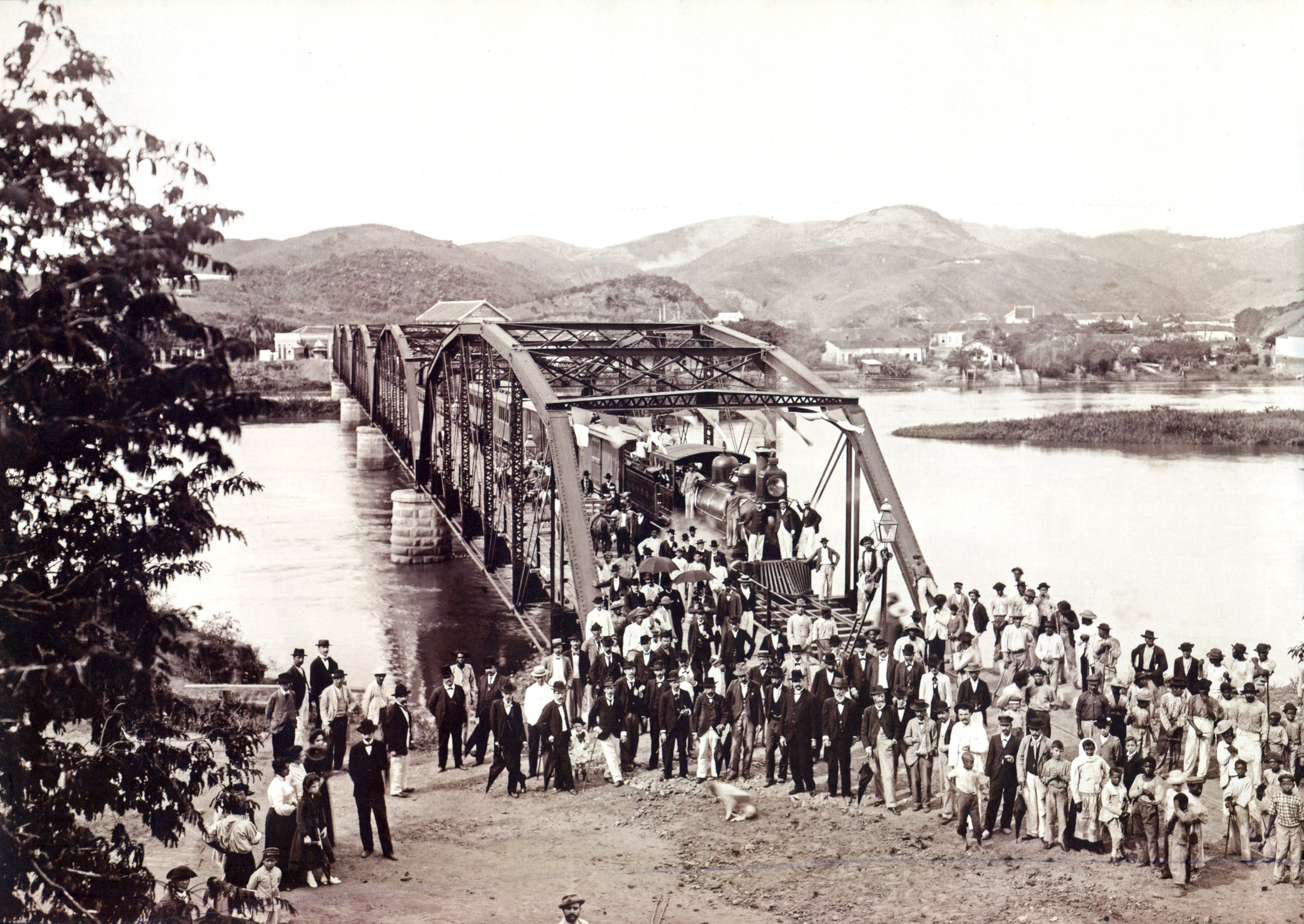
Inauguration of the bridge over the Rio Paraíba in 1888.

In late 1889, when the republic was proclaimed, there were 9,583 km (5,955 mi) of active railways in Brazil, which served 14 of the 20 provinces. The government of the republic decided to start a new plan to build railways across Brazil, but few new railways were actually built because of the government financial crisis.

=== Expansion ===
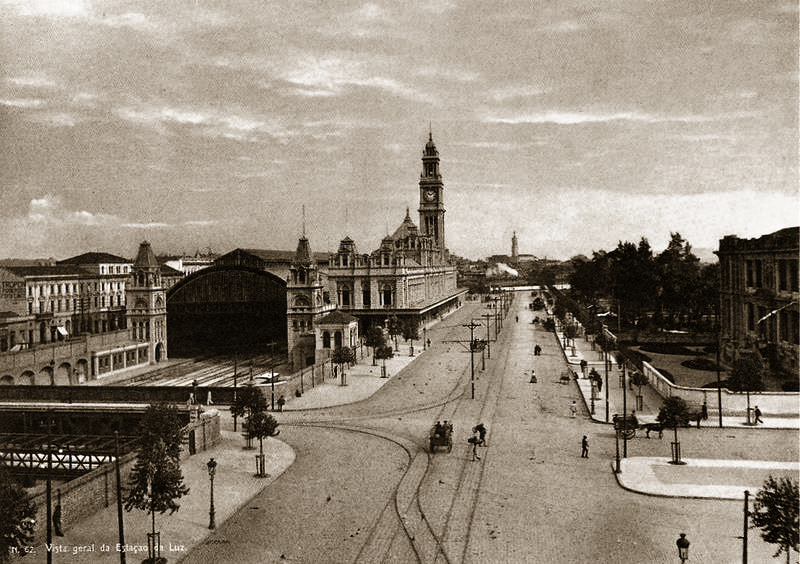
Photo of the Estação da Luz in the 1900s, by Guilherme Gaensly

In 1907, the process of leasing out the Brazilian rail network started, with a statement from then president Campos Sales:

Our long experience has shown that there's no advantage in keeping the railways under national management. Giving them to the private initiative and stimulating their development not only relieves the national treasure but brings more utility for both commerce and industry.

During the years of the Old Republic, there was significant expansion of the rail network, reaching 29,000 km (18,000 mi) of rails, versus the 9,538 km (5,927 mi) that existed during the imperial period. The biggest expansion occurred in the state of São Paulo, where at its peak there were 18 railways, the biggest being the E.F Sorocabana, with 2,074 km (1,289 mi), Mogiana, with 1,954 km (1,214 mi), the E.F Noroeste do Brasil, with 1539 km and the Cia. Paulista de Estradas de Ferro with 1,536 km (954 mi), and the São Paulo railway, which held the connection with the port of Santos. Together, they helped the growth of agriculture and industry in the state.

Besides the railways in São Paulo, other significant railways were founded in this age, like the Estrada de Ferro Vitória a Minas in 1903 and the Madeira-Mamoré railway in 1912.

Electric locomotives, planned since 1922, were introduced in the 1930s, to substitute steam locomotives in some stretches of track. In 1938, diesel-electric locomotives started operating in Brazil, and continue to be the main locomotives in use to this day.

Starting with the first government of Getúlio Vargas, the development of highways was prioritized, putting others ways, which until then had played key roles in national planning in the background. At this time, the nationalization of the railways also started, mainly the ones controlled by overseas companies. However, the lack of planning and investment in the interwar period made railways fall into disrepair, and few new tracks were laid.

=== Nationalization era ===
In the 50s, the government request a study into the state of the railways in Brazil, which as of 1956 represented 14% of the debt country-wide. On 30 September 1957, the Rede Ferroviária Federal S.A. (RFFSA) was created, uniting 22 railways. Its objective was to standardize the railways, reduce the debts and modernize the network.

In 1971, the government of the state of São Paulo founded the other great state-owned railway, the FEPASA, uniting five railways already owned by the state. In the start, it had almost 5000 km of track, covering almost all of the state of São Paulo.

With the objective to reduce the debt of the railways, the used track was cut down to 32.163 km in 1964, and in the following years many branch lines which were considered uneconomical were closed down.

With the economical and political crisis that were happening in Brazil in the '70s, the RFFSA lost most of its budget. During the '80s, a lot of the network fell into permanent disrepair, and the railways, which were the most efficient method of transport lost much of its market share. In the end of the '80s, the RFFSA's budget was only 19% of what it was in the end of the '70s.

=== Privatization era ===
On 10 March 1992, the RFFSA entered Collor's de-nationalization program.

Due to the opening up of the economy, Brazil entering international markets and the need for better alternatives for cargo transport, the RFFSA was sold off to private companies in 1996, with FEPASA following up in 1997. The government retained ownership of the rail infrastructure.

With the extinction of the RFFSA, most passenger lines were also extinct, with only the Trem de Prata, which connect Rio de Janeiro to São Paulo surviving for one more year, being extinct 1998.

=== Historic Tramways ===
Brazil is the fifth-largest country in the world and had a hundred tram systems, almost as many as all the other Latin American countries combined. It had one of the world's first tramways: an 1859 system in Rio de Janeiro pre-dates street railway experiments in all European countries except France. Trams still operate in Rio today, over 150 years later. Brazil has one of the first steam-powered street railways and had the world's first steam locomotive designed specifically to work on the street. It had one of the world's first electric trams, Rio de Janeiro had electric streetcars before London, Paris, Rome, Madrid, Lisbon and any other city in Latin America. Niterói, Brazil, may have been the first place where the trams were successfully fed by storage batteries. Brazil had the largest collection of American streetcars built outside the United States, and had the world's largest foreign-owned street railway empire.

Five trams were still operating in 1989, the Santa Teresa and Corcovado lines in Rio de Janeiro; the Campos do Jordão line near São Paulo; the Itatinga line near Bertioga; and the tourist tram in Campinas. A sixth line, the Tirirical tram near São Luís, ceased operation in 1983 but may be reactivated.

Currently, there are vintage tramways operating in:

- Campinas – Heritage Tram
- Campos do Jordão – Interurban Tramway
- Itatinga – Non-public Tramway
- Rio de Janeiro – Santa Teresa Tram
- Santos – Santos tramways, Heritage Tramway
- Belém – Heritage Tramway

=== Historical Railway companies ===
Pre-1957 companies - this list is incomplete

- Estrada de Ferro Central do Brasil, nationalised 1957
- Estrada de Ferro Oeste de Minas, a part of this railway still operates as a heritage railway
- Estrada Ferro Recife ao São Francisco
- Estrada de Ferro Rio d'Ouro
- Estrada de Ferro Santos-Jundiaí, nationalised 1957 - 1,600 mm (5 ft 3 in) gauge
- Estrada de Ferro Sorocabana
- São Paulo Railway, nationalised 1946, renamed Estrada de Ferro Santos-Jundiaí 1948

==== State ownership ====
- Estrada de Ferro Central de Pernambuco
- RFFSA (Rede Ferroviária Federal, Sociedade Anônima). Created in 1957 and dissolved between 1999 and 2007.

== Locomotives ==
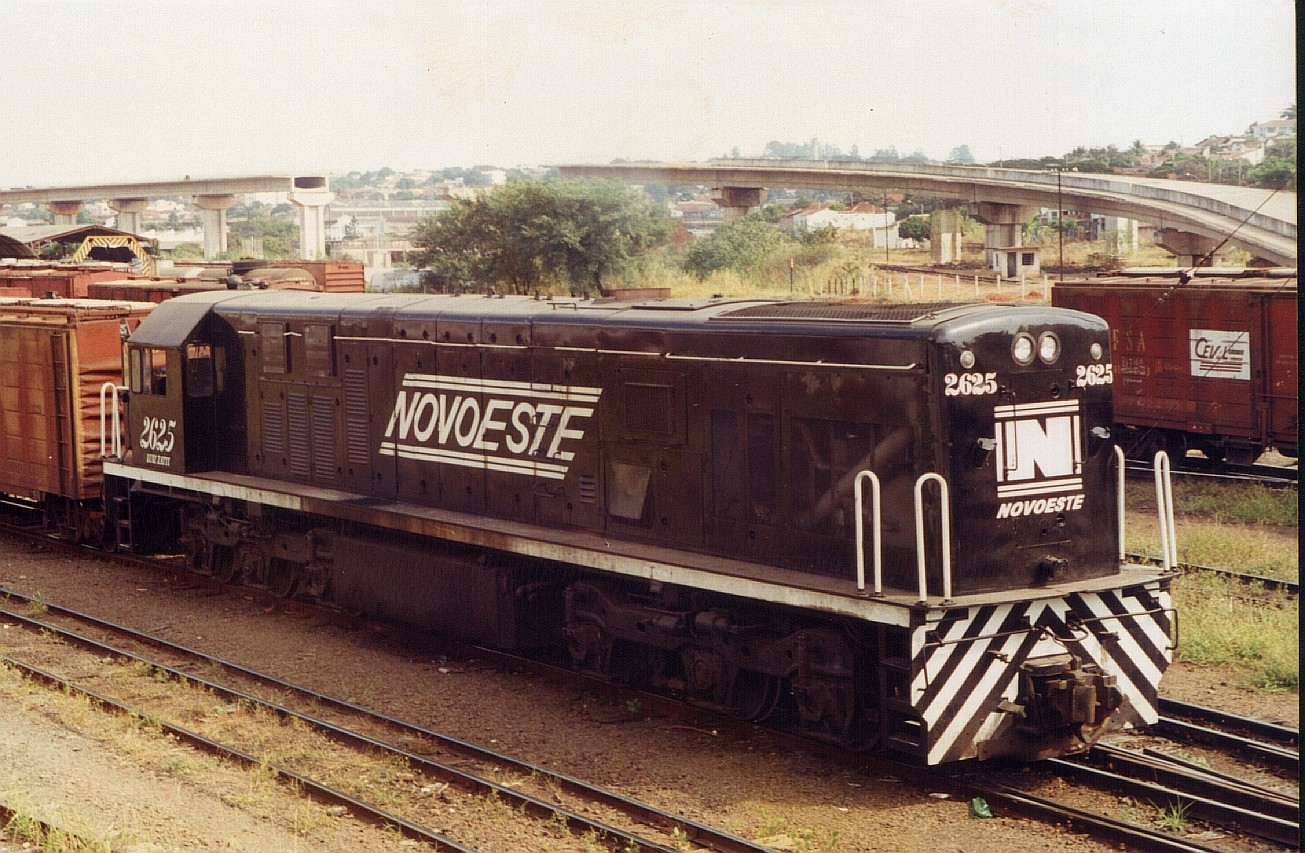
GE U20C NOVOESTE #2625

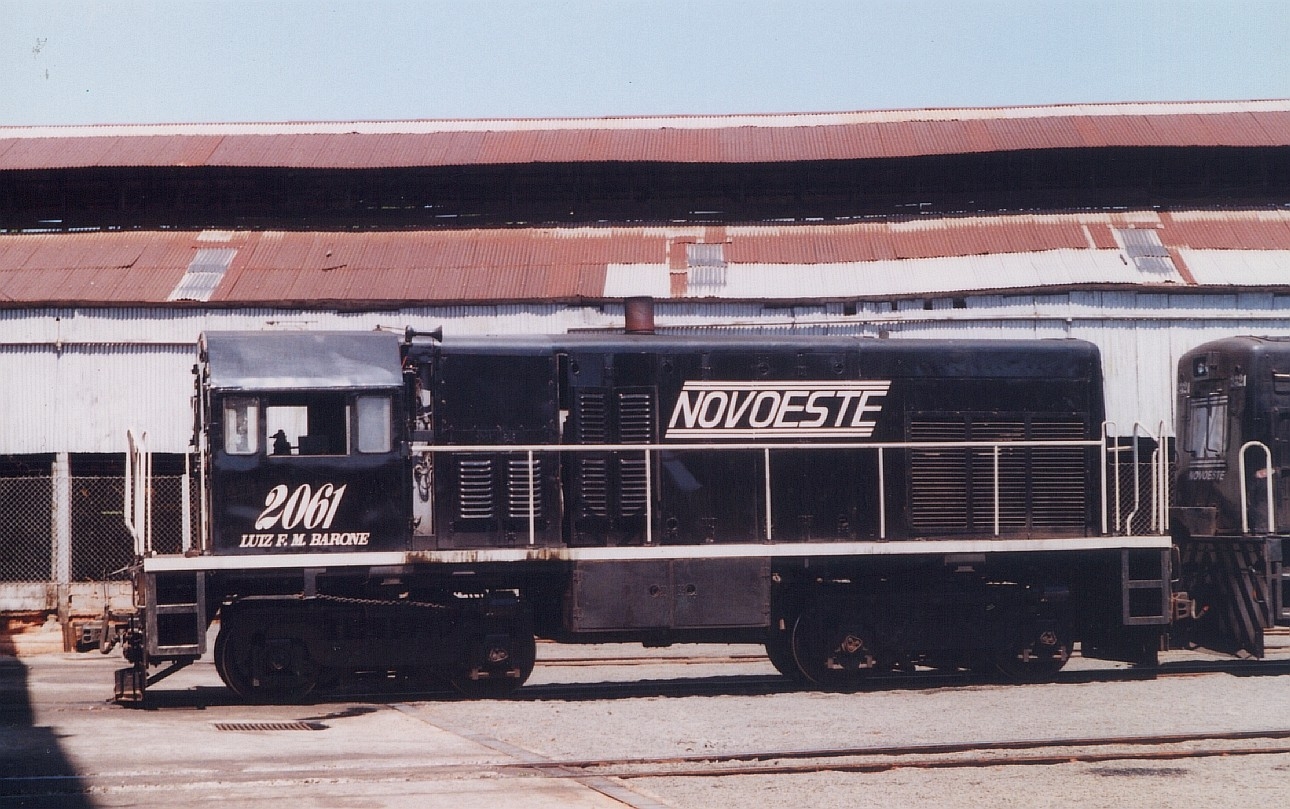
GE U5B NOVOESTE #2061 - "Luiz F. M. Barone"

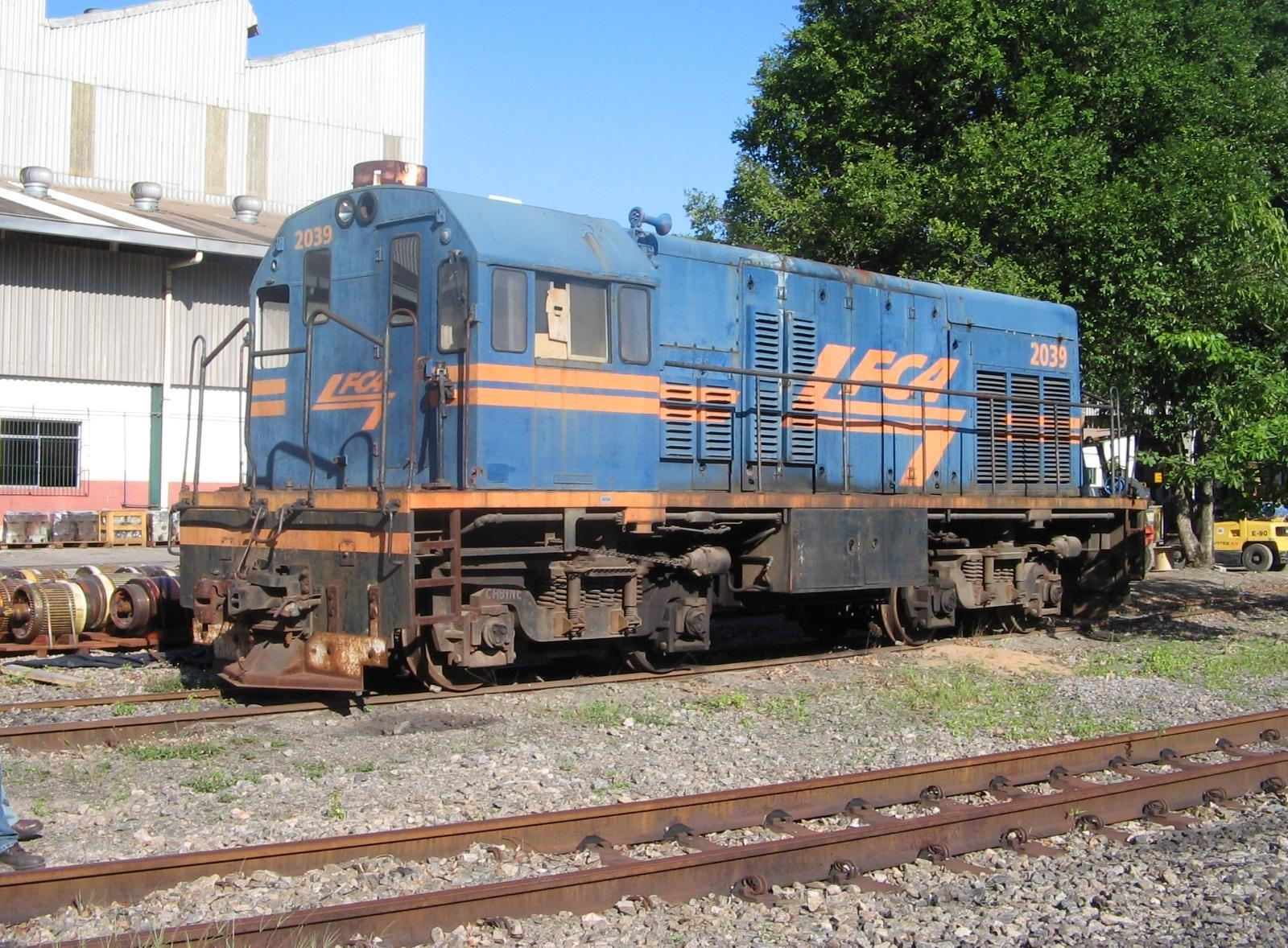
GE U5B FCA (Ferrovia Centro-Atlântica) #2039

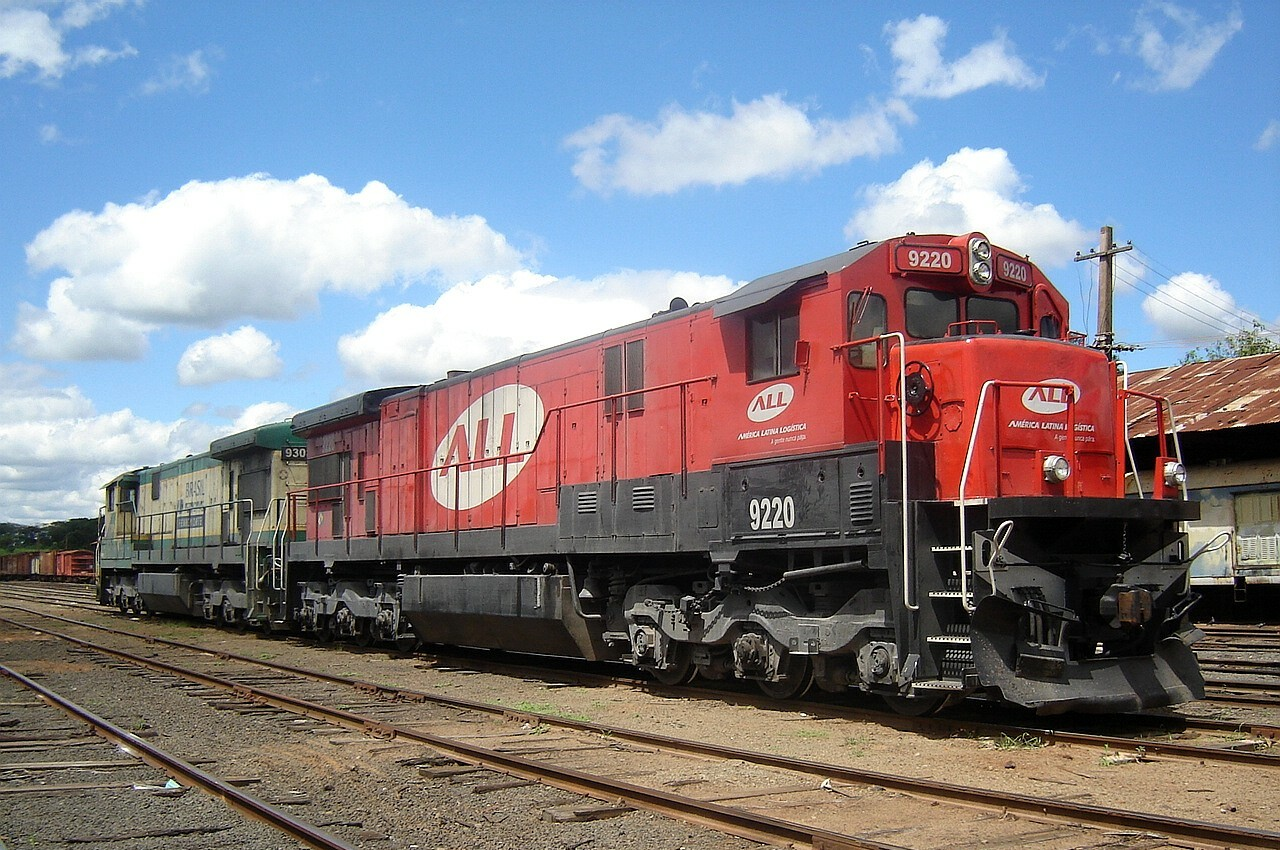
GE C30-7 #9220 of América Latina Logística

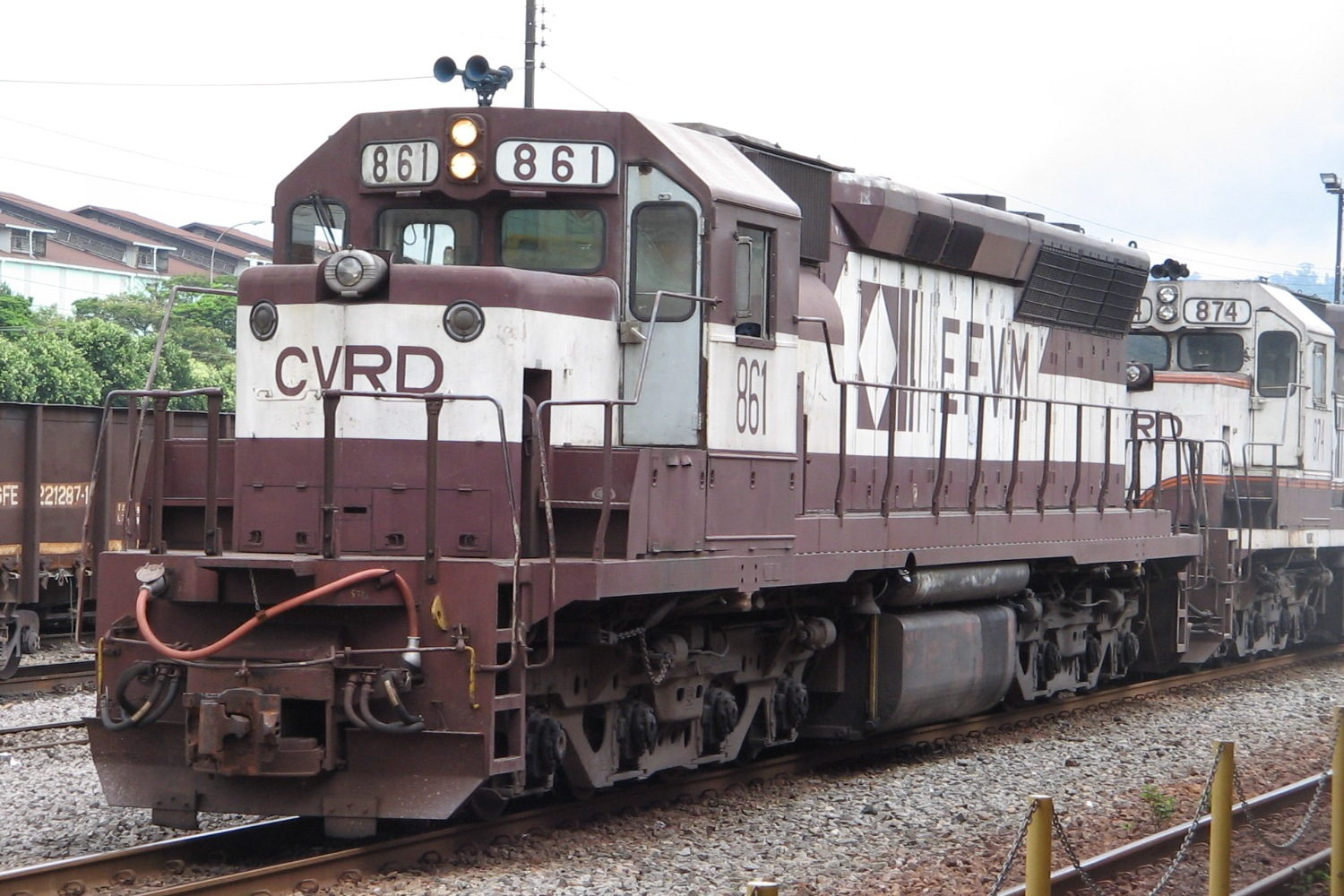
EMD DDM45 from Estrada de Ferro Vitória a Minas, of VALE.

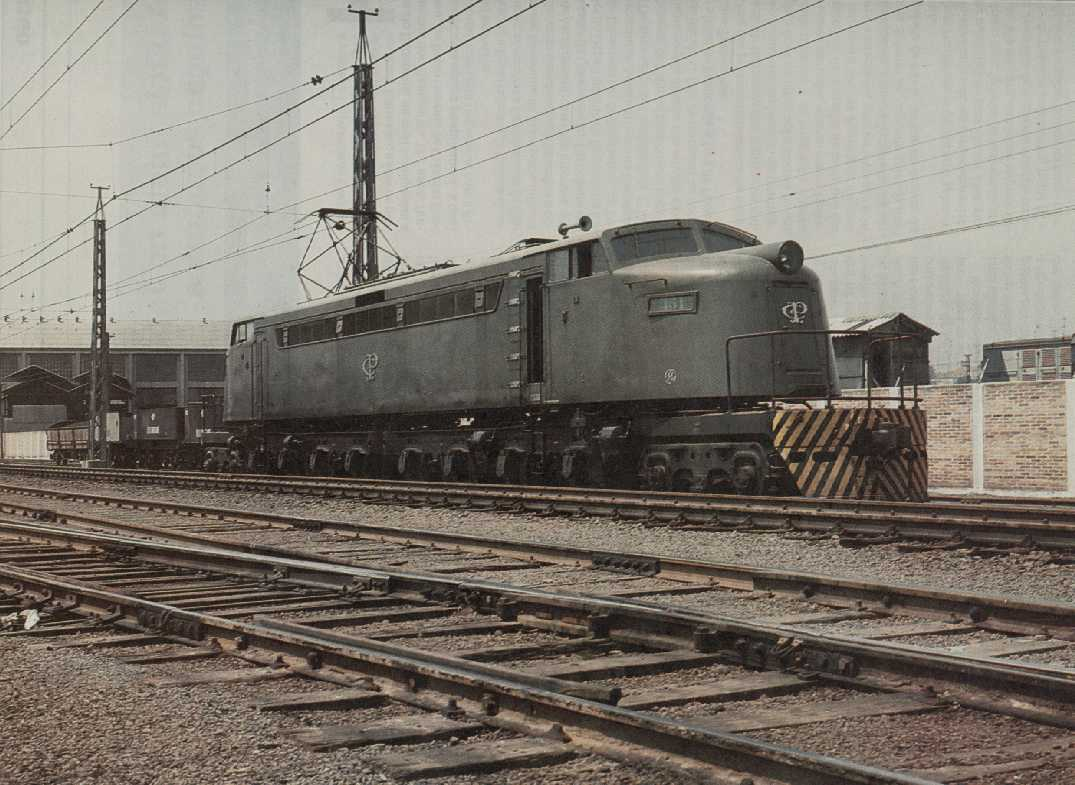
FEPASA Little Joe electric locomotive

== See also ==
- Present day Brazilian railway companies
- Transport in Brazil
- North-South Railway
