= Pau-Brasil Ecological Station =

Pau-Brasil Ecological Station may refer to one of two ecological stations protecting stands of Brazil Wood (Pau Brasil):

- Pau-Brasil Ecological Station (Bahia)
- Pau-Brasil Ecological Station (Paraíba)
