= Danielle do Vale =

State Deputy of Paraíba
- Incumbent
- Assumed office 1 February 2027
- Constituency: Paraíba

Personal details
- Born: 19 May 1980 (age 46)
- Party: Republicans (Brazil)

Danielle do Nascimento Rodrigues Pessoa (Mamanguape, 19 May 1980), known as Danielle do Vale, is a Brazilian politician and accountant who is a member of the Republicans party. In 2026, she was elected to the Paraíba State House of Representatives for the legislative term that began in 2027.
