= Recife Central Station =

Railway station in Recife, Brazil

Recife Central Station Estação Central do Recife
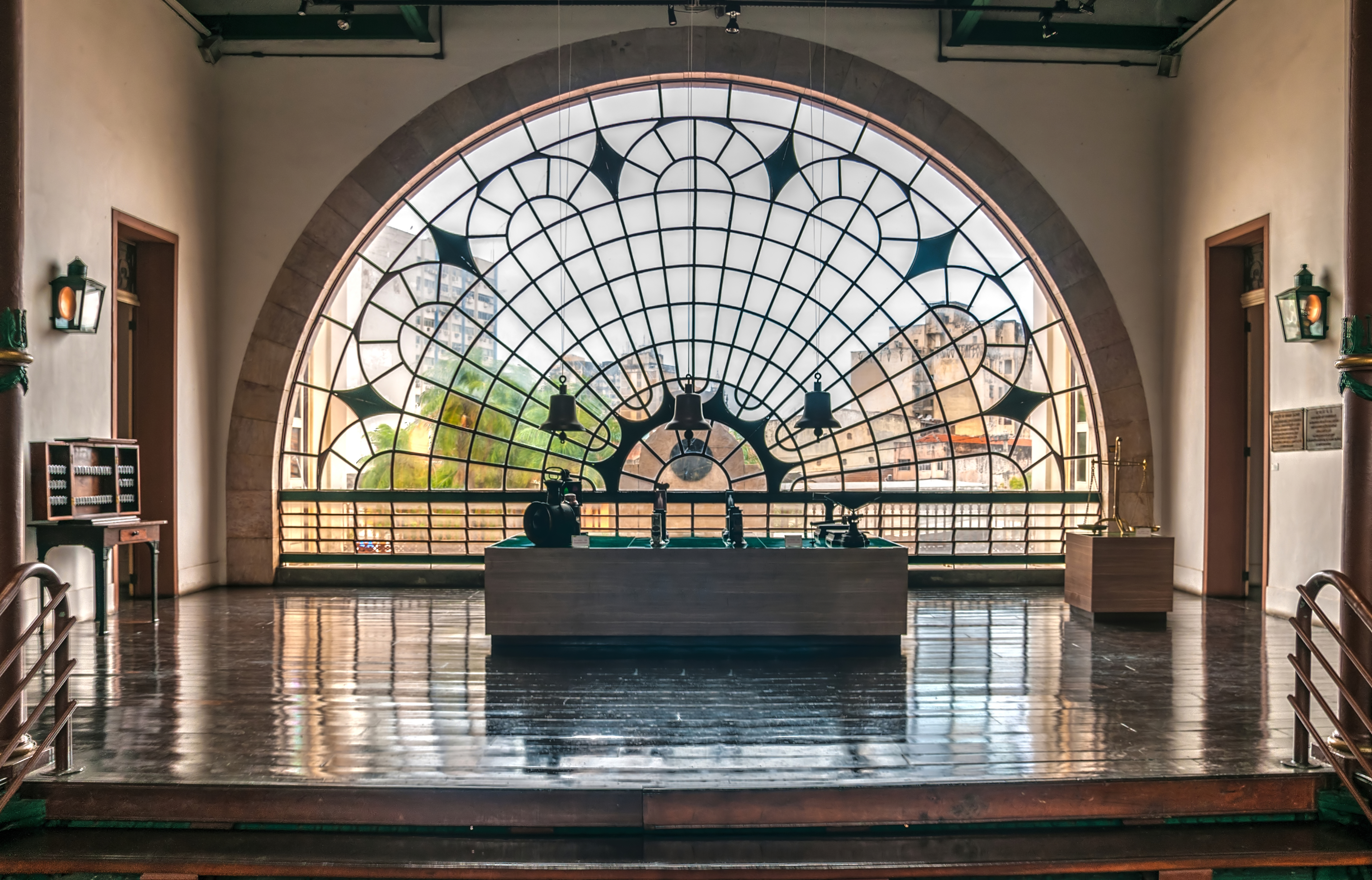
- Train Museum

General information
- Location: Recife, suburbs of Recife and cities in the interior of the state
- Coordinates: 8.067469°S 34.883589°W
- Owner: FUNDARPE

Key dates
- 1885: Inauguration on March 25, 1885
- (1890-1901): EFCP administration
- (1901-1951): GWBR administration
- (1951-1957): RFN administration
- (1957-1984): RFFSA administration
- (1984-2011): CBTU administration
- (2011-current): Train Museum under FUNDARPE administration
Location

Recife Central Station, also known as Estação Central Capiba/Museu do Trem, was a railway station built in Pernambuco. Opened in 1888, the station was the starting point for trips to the suburbs of Recife, cities in the interior of Pernambuco and neighboring states in the Northeast Region.

Built in 1885, the station was provisionally designed in the neighborhood of São José. The current building was inaugurated in March 1888 and is located on Floriano Peixoto street, the building was designed by the Minas Gerais architect Herculano Ramos for the Recife Railway Caruaru.
