= Rio Tinto, Paraíba =

- Municipality
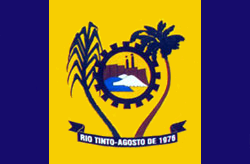
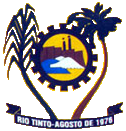
- Flag Coat of arms

- Location in Brazil
- Coordinates: 6.807005°S 35.077799°W
- Country: Brazil
- Region: South
- State: Paraíba
- Mesoregion: Mata Paraibana

Population (2020)
  - Total: 24,218
- Time zone: UTC−3 (BRT)

Rio Tinto, Paraíba is a municipality in the state of Paraíba in the Northeast Region of Brazil.

The municipality contains part of the 4,052-hectare (10,010-acre) Guaribas Biological Reserve, a fully protected conservation unit created in 1990.

== See also ==
- List of municipalities in Paraíba
