= Engenho Gargaú Private Natural Heritage Reserve =

Reserve in Paraíba, Brazil

- Reserva Particular do Patrimônio Natural Engenho Gargaú
- Location within Brazil
- Nearest city: Santa Rita, Paraíba
- Coordinates: 7.021°S 34.956°W
- Area: 1,058.62 hectares (2,615.9 acres)
- Designation: Private natural heritage reserve

The Engenho Gargaú Private Natural Heritage Reserve (Portuguese: Reserva Particular do Patrimônio Natural Engenho Gargaú) is a private natural heritage reserve in the state of Paraíba, Brazil.

== Establishment ==
The reserve covers an area of 1,058.62 hectares (2,615.9 acres) in the municipality of Santa Rita, Paraíba. It was created by decree on 15 June 1994. Before it was created the reserve had been exploited for timber and agricultural crops.

== Fauna ==
It was thought that the blond capuchin monkey (Cebus flavius) was extinct, but it has been rediscovered in two Atlantic Forest fragments in Paraíba, the Camaratuba Experimental Station and the Gargaú reserve. The animals are listed as Critically Endangered on the IUCN Red List. Sample animals were captured and examined in the Gargaú reserve. They seemed healthy and sufficiently genetically diverse to form a viable population. The reserve is also home to the red-handed howler (Alouatta belzebul) and common marmoset (Callithrix jacchus).

== Sources ==
- Emanuel Ubaldino Torres Junior (25 September 2015), Conhecimento ecológico e percepção ambiental sobre primatas por uma comunidade rural no entorno da reserva particular do patrimônio natural Engenho Gargaú, Paraíba – Brasil (Thesis), Federal University of Paraiba
- Feitoza, Camila Andrade; Medeiros Silva, Lígia Maria de; Sabino, Alberto Alves (2016), "COMPOSIÇÃO FLORÍSTICA E FITOSSOCIOLOGICA DO COMPONENTE ARBÓREO DA RESERVA PARTICULAR DO PATRIMÔNIO NATURAL (RPPN) ENGENHO GARGAÚ, SANTA RITA – PB", Revista de Biologia e Ciências da Terra, 16 (2), ISSN 1519-5228
- Mônica Mafra Valença Montenegro (2011-12-05), Ecologia de Cebus flavius (Schreber, 1774) em remanescentes de Mata Atlântica no estado da Paraíba (Thesis), Universidade de São Paulo
- RPPN Engenho Gargaú (in Portuguese), ICMBio
