= Sistema de Trens Urbanos de João Pessoa =

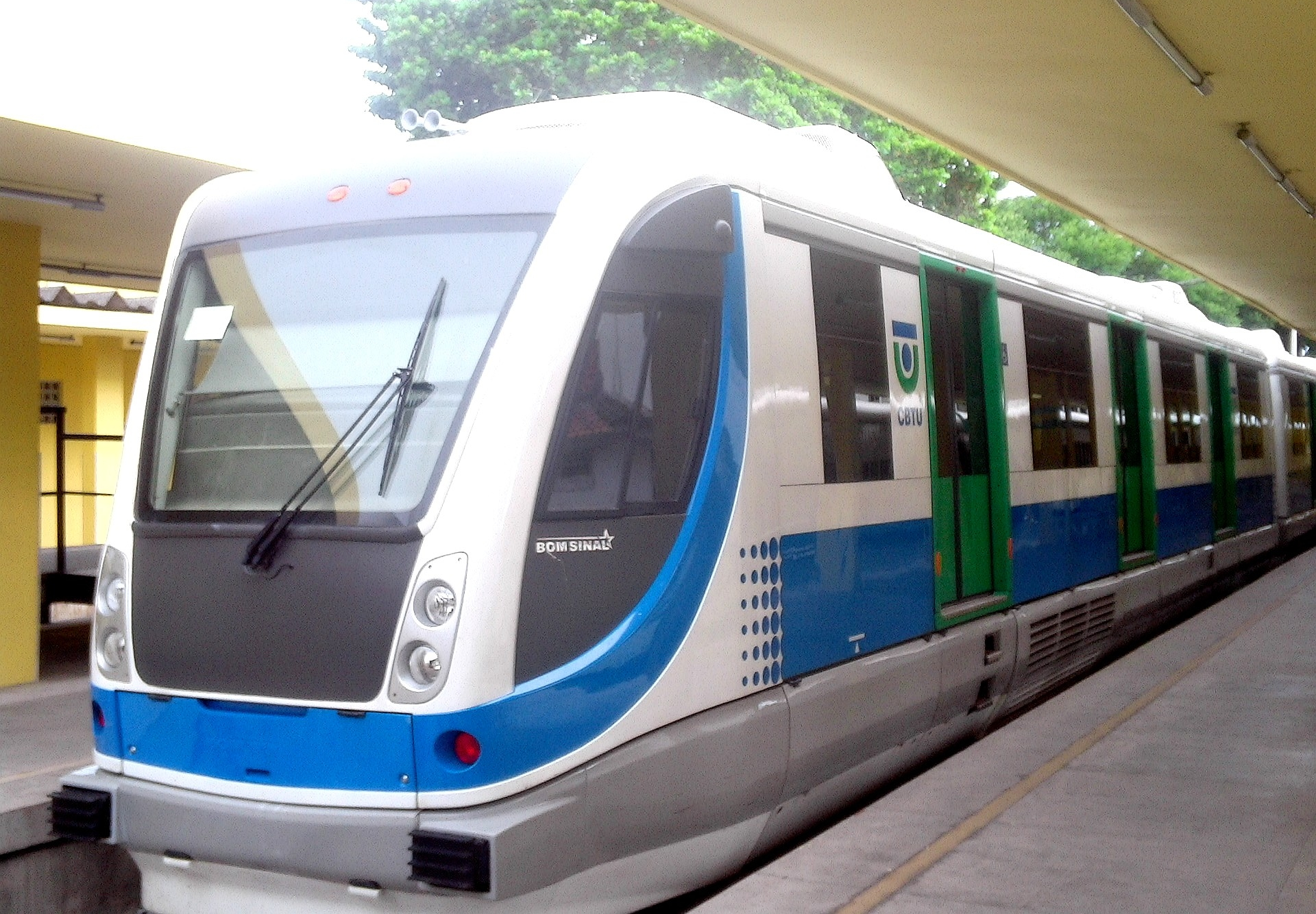

Overview
- Owner: CBTU
- Locale: João Pessoa, Paraíba, Brazil
- Transit type: Commuter rail
- Number of lines: 1
- Number of stations: 13
- Daily ridership: 11,600

Technical
- System length: 30.03 km (18.66 mi)
- Track gauge: 1,000 mm (3 ft 3 3/8 in) metre gauge
System map
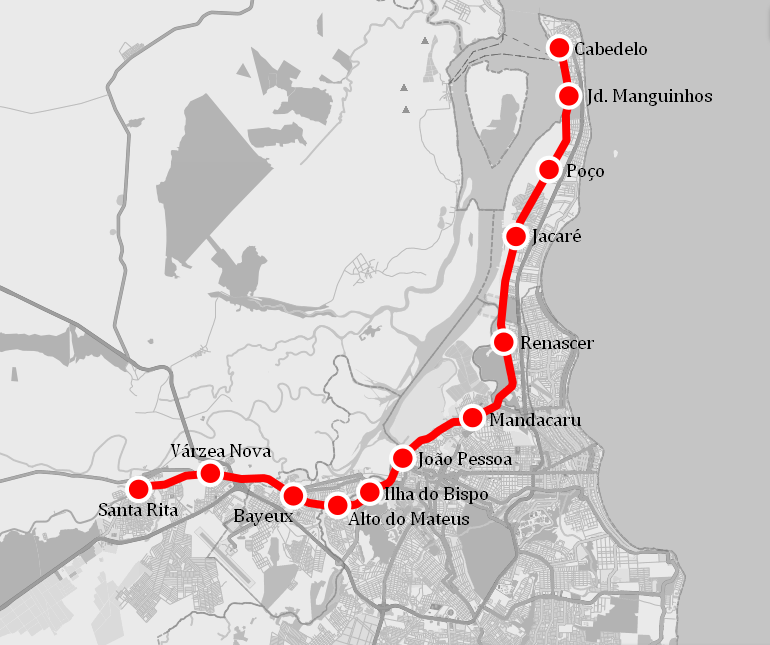

The Sistema de Trens Urbanos de João Pessoa (João Pessoa Urban Trains System), also known as VLT de João Pessoa (VLT for Veiculo Leve sobre Trilhos, Light Rail Vehicle) is the metropolitan train system of the João Pessoa Metropolitan Region. It is operated by the Companhia Brasileira de Trens Urbanos (CBTU) through the Superintendência de Trens Urbanos de João Pessoa.

It currently consists of 13 stations on a single line of 30.03 kilometers, which interconnects the municipalities of Santa Rita, Bayeux, João Pessoa and Cabedelo in the state of Paraíba, carrying an average of 11,600 passengers per day.

== History ==
=== Imperial Period (1871–1889) ===
In November 1871, the Princess Isabel signed the Decree No. 4838 to build and operate the Companhia Estrada de Ferro Conde D’Eu, connecting the seat of the Province to the village of Alagoa Grande, with extensions to those of Ingá and Independência (former name of the city of Guarabira). This concession did not go forward.

In 1880 the concession is given to the Companhia Estrada de Ferro Conde D’Eu of Imperial Brazil that began the construction of a 40 km stretch linking João Pessoa to the town of Entroncamento in Sapé, Paraíba, which was inaugurated in 1881. In Entroncamento the railroad branched off to the north with branches to Mulungu in 1882, Guarabira in 1884, and continuing to Nova Cruz in Rio Grande do Norte and from there to the capital of the state of Rio Grande do Norte, Natal. The southern section arrived in Pilar in 1883. The connection between the state capital, Parahyba do Norte (present João Pessoa) and the port of Cabedelo occurred in 1889 with the construction of a stretch of 35 km. In that same year proclamation of the republic happened, stopping the works of construction of the railroad.

=== Great Western Railway (1901–1957) ===
The republican government administered the railroad for eleven years, and in 1901 construction was resumed of the approximately 36 km line from Mulungu to Alagoa Grande. In July of that same year, the Republican government leased the railroad to the British company Great Western Railway (that operated in the country from 1873, in Pernambuco), that extended the southern section of Pilar to Timbaúba and completed the northern section of Guarabira to Nova Cruz, in the state of Rio Grande do Norte. In 1907 the Great Western Railway arrived in Campina Grande.

=== Re-establishment and administration by the RFFSA (1957–1982) ===
In 1957 the Great Western Railway concession ended, and the government created the Rede Ferroviária Federal, which managed the system with long-distance trains. In 1982 most of the state railroads were disabled.

=== Creation of CBTU (1984–present) ===
In February 1984 with Decree-Law No. 89,396 the Companhia Brasileira de Trens Urbanos (CBTU) was founded, linked to the National Transport Ministry of Transport Department which manages the urban train of João Pessoa. The commuter rail system was reactivated in Paraíba in March 1985 by running used ALCO diesel locomotive-hauled trains with six passenger cars each in-between Santa Rita and Cabedelo. In 1996 the federal government privatized the cargo transportation currently operated by Companhia Ferroviária do Nordeste. In 2007 the RFFSA ceased to operate. Currently the urban train system of João Pessoa is a single metre gauge line of 30 km, run with five diesel electric multiple units of type Mobile 3, delivered from 2014 to 2017 by Brazilian railcar manufacturer Bom Sinal.

== System features ==
=== Stations ===
- Santa Rita
- Várzea Nova
- Bayeux
- Alto do Mateus
- Ilha do Bispo
- João Pessoa
- Mandacarú
- Renascer
- Jacaré
- Poço
- Jardim Camboinha (since Dec. 2022)
- Jardim Manguinhos
- Cabedelo

== Projects ==
A modernization of the line began in 2014 and is due for completion in 2020. An additional four stations will also be added.
