= Pau-Brasil Ecological Station (Paraíba) =

- Estação Ecológica do Pau-Brasil
- IUCN category Ia (strict nature reserve)
- Location within Brazil
- Nearest city: João Pessoa, Paraíba
- Coordinates: 6°36′17″S 35°07′45″W
- Area: 82 hectares (200 acres)
- Designation: Ecological station
- Created: 25 March 2002

The Pau-Brasil Ecological Station (Portuguese: Estação Ecológica do Pau-Brasil is an ecological station in state of Paraíba, Brazil. It protects a stand of the endangered Pau Brazil (Brazil Wood) trees, and is home to the endangered blond capuchin (Sapajus flavius).

== Location ==
Pau-Brasil Ecological Station was created by state decree 22,881 of 25 March 2002. It is in the northern part of the municipality of Mamanguape, on the north coast of Paraíba. It contains a remnant of about 82 hectares (200 acres) of Atlantic Forest, with characteristic semi-deciduous seasonal forest. The soils are mostly sandy or clay, with low fertility. The climate is humid tropical, with a dry summer and rainy winter. Average annual rainfall is 1,512 millimetres (59.5 in) and average annual temperature ranges from 24 to 27 °C (75 to 81 °F). It is one of two conservation units in the municipality, the other being the Guaribas Biological Reserve.

== Conservation ==
The Pau-Brazil (Caesalpinia echinata) is a native species of the Atlantic Forest that has been heavily exploited since the European discovery of Brazil. The tree has almost disappeared due to the devastation of coastal forests, and is officially listed as being threatened with extinction. A 2006 study of the trees of this species in the conservation unit indicated that over time mortality was exceeding replacement. The station also holds the endangered blond capuchin (Sapajus flavius). Sudema plans to create a headquarters office to support management, sustainable tourism, environmental education and scientific research, and also to create a nursery for Brazil wood seedlings.

== Sources ==
- Michelle Scarione, "Mamanguape é região importante para preservação do pau-brasil", Paraíba Urgente (in Portuguese), archived from the original on 2016-09-23
- "Municipio de Mamanguape", Cidade-Brasil.com.br (in Portuguese)
- Juan Diego Silva Lourenço; Sergio Romero da Silva Xavier (2013), "SAMAMBAIAS DA ESTAÇÃO ECOLÓGIA DO PAU-BRASIL, PARAÍBA, BRASIL" (PDF), Pesquisas, Botânica (in Portuguese), 64, São Leopoldo: Instituto Anchietano de Pesquisas, archived from the original (PDF) on 2016-09-20
- Sylvia Sátyro Xavier Tertuliano (2006), Estrutura e dinâmica de uma população de Caesalpinia echinata lam. (Pau-Brasil) no litoral norte da Paraíba: uma perspectiva para conservação da espécie (in Portuguese), UFPB
