= Estrada de Ferro Central de Pernambuco =

Brazilian railway company

- EFCP

Overview
- Main region: Pernambuco
- Headquarters: Recife, Brazil
- Dates of operation: 1879–1904
- Predecessor: Estrada de Ferro Recife–Caruaru
- Successor: Great Western of Brazil Railway

Technical
- Track gauge: 1,000 m
- Length: 180 km (1896)

Estrada de Ferro Central de Pernambuco (EFCP) was a Brazilian railway company based in Recife. Established in 1879, the company was named Estrada de Ferro Recife–Caruaru (EFRC) until 1890.

The Estrada de Ferro Central de Pernambuco was built to facilitate communication and trade between Recife and the rural interior of Pernambuco. At its peak in 1896, it reached a length of 180 km. The EFCP was abolished in 1904 and its railway network was incorporated into the Great Western of Brazil Railway.

== History ==
=== Origins ===
The government Pernambuco signed a contract with Bento José da Costa Júnior on February 10, 1874, aiming to build the first section of the Estrada de Ferro Recife–Caruaru. The purpose of the railway was to improve the flow of commerce between Recife and the rural agricultural region of Pernambuco.

Based on studies on the railway route, completed in 1878, it was determined that the railway bound for Caruaru would include the then village of Jaboatão in its railway network. The report delivered to the Ministry of Agriculture concludes that the route of the Estrada de Ferro Recife–Caruaru would cover an area with around two hundred sugarcane engenhos.

=== Construction and consolidation ===
Construction began in 1881, with excavation and earthworks in the section between Recife and Jaboatão. Initially operating on a 17 km route, the first section of the EFCR opened in 1885. Years after the inauguration of the previous section, in 1894 the railway arrived in Gravatá. The slow expansion of the Estrada de Ferro Central de pernambuco is attributed to the challenges faced in crossing the Serra das Russas, a treacherous area of the Borborema Plateau. The development of this new segment required the construction of many infrastructure elements, including the creation of nine viaducts and the building of twenty-one tunnels. The railway reached Caruaru in 1895.

=== Apogee and dissolution ===
The EFCP reached a maximum length of 180 km in 1896, when the Antonio Olinto station was opened, in the city of Tacaimbó.

The company remained in activity until 1904 when it was dissolved and its railway network incorporated into that of the Great Western of Brazil Railway.

== See also ==
Estrada Ferro Recife ao São Francisco

Rail transport in Brazil
