= Santa Rita, Paraíba =

Santa Rita
- Municipality
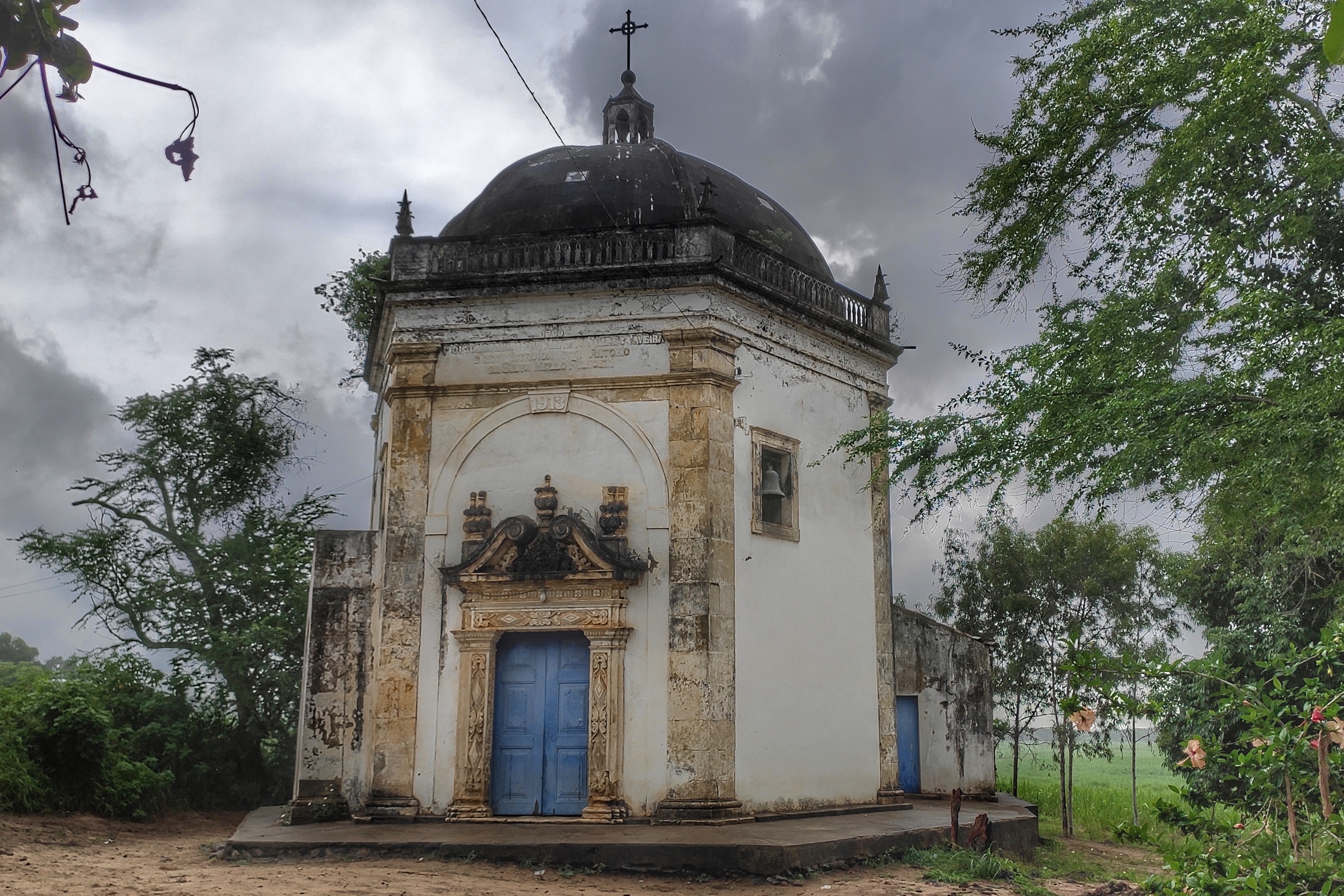

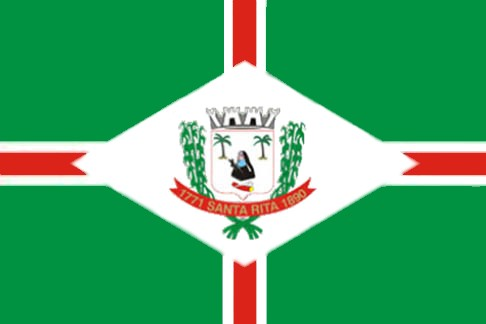
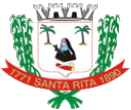
- Flag Coat of arms

- Location in Brazil
- Coordinates: 7°6′50″S 34°58′40″W
- Country: Brazil
- State: Paraíba
- Macroregion: Mata Paraibana
- Microregion: João Pessoa
- Founded: 19 March 1890

Government
  - Mayor: Jackson Alvino Da Costa (2024-2028)

Population (2022 Census)
  - Total: 149,910
  - Estimate (2025): 160,852
- Demonym: Santaritense
- Time zone: UTC−3 (BRT)
- Website: Official website

Santa Rita, Paraíba is a municipality in the state of Paraíba in the Northeast Region of Brazil.

Santa Cruz Recreativo Esporte Clube is the municipality's football club. In this municipality is located the Presidente Castro Pinto International Airport which serves the state capital, João Pessoa. The municipality contains the Engenho Gargaú Private Natural Heritage Reserve, which holds a population of the critically endangered blond capuchin monkey (Cebus flavius).

== See also ==
- List of municipalities in Paraíba
