= Mamanguape =

- Municipality
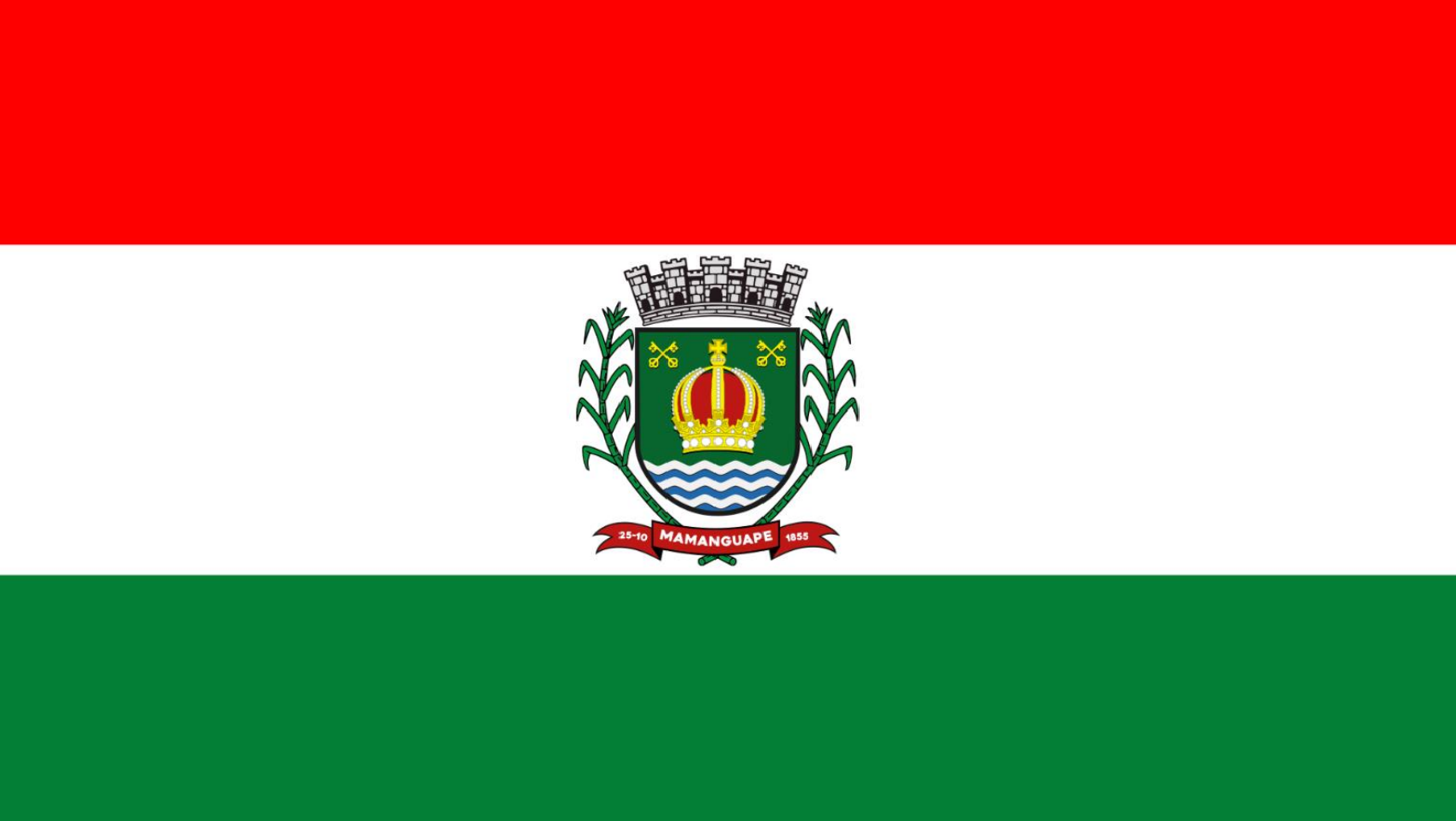
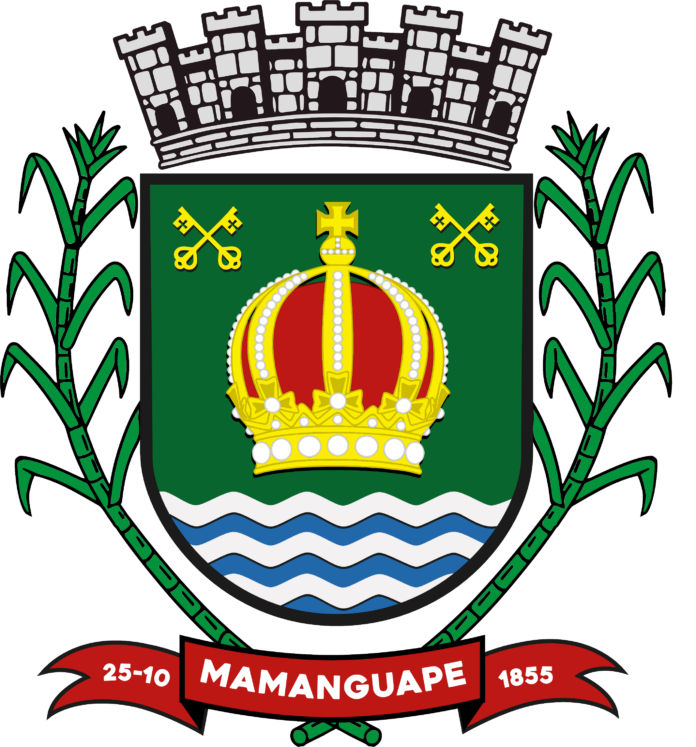
- Flag Coat of arms

- Location in Brazil
- Coordinates: 6.837546°S 35.126718°W
- Country: Brazil
- Region: South

Population (2020)
  - Total: 45,136
- Time zone: UTC−3 (BRT)

Mamanguape is a municipality in the state of Paraíba in the Northeast Region of Brazil.

The municipality contains part of the 4,052-hectare (10,010-acre) Guaribas Biological Reserve, a fully protected conservation unit created in 1990. It also contains the Pau-Brasil Ecological Station, which protects a stand of endangered Pau-Brazil (Caesalpinia echinata) trees.

== See also ==
- List of municipalities in Paraíba
