= Maceió Urban Rail =

Coordinates: 9°39′57″S 35°44′06″W

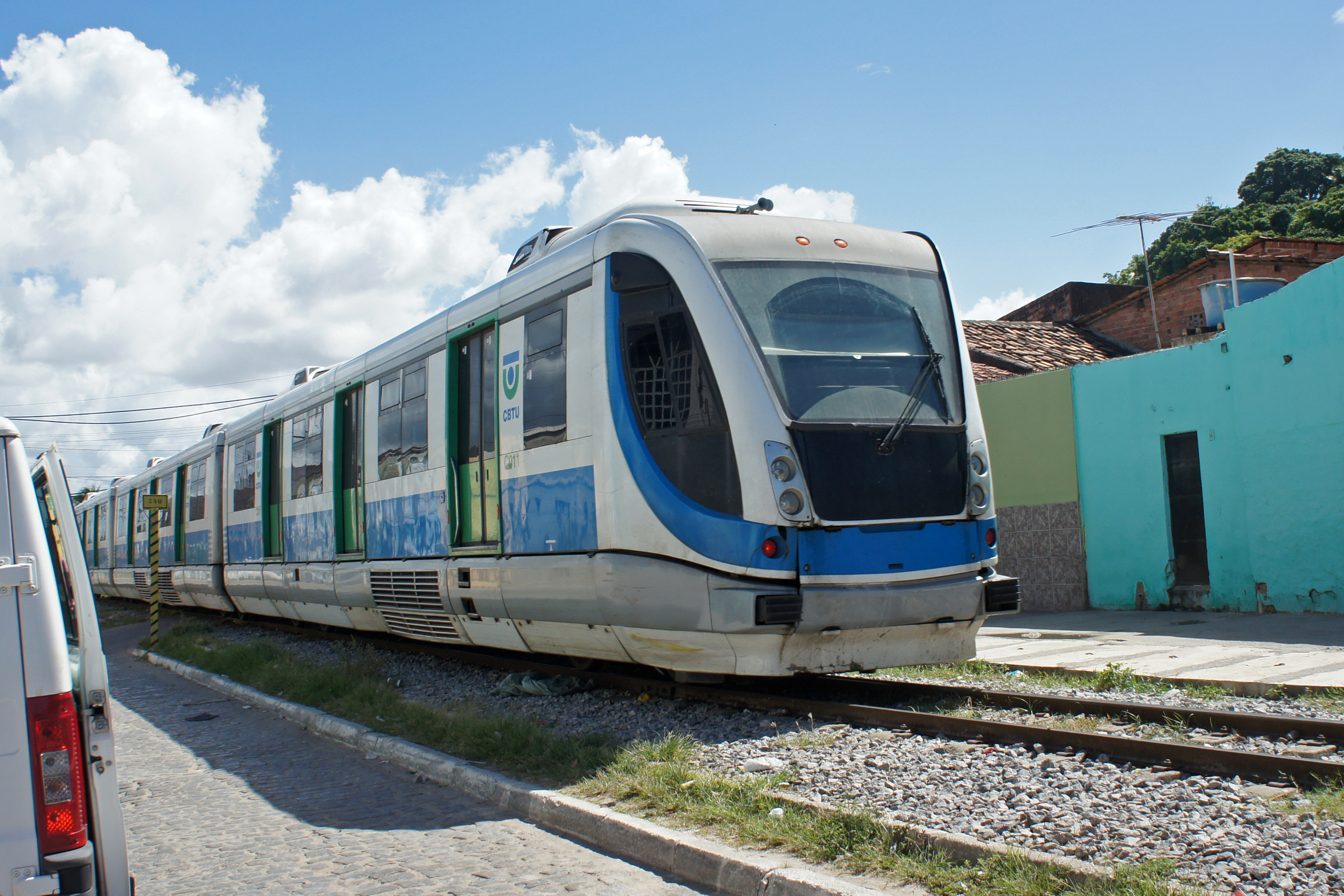

Overview
- Native name: Sistema de Trens Urbanos de Maceió
- Locale: Maceió, Alagoas, Brazil
- Termini: Maceió; Lourenço Albuquerque
- Stations: 15

Service
- Type: Commuter rail
- Operator(s): CBTU
- Rolling stock: 3 locomotives & 21 cars
- Daily ridership: 11,000

History
- Opened: 31 December 2011

Technical
- Line length: 32.1 km (19.9 mi)
- Track gauge: 1,000 mm (3 ft 3 3/8 in) metre gauge

Maceió Urban Rail (Portuguese: Sistema de Trens Urbanos de Maceió) is the 32.1-kilometre (19.9 mi) metre gauge diesel commuter rail line that serves the city of Maceió, Alagoas, Brazil. The line connects Maceió with two cities in the metropolitan area, Satuba and Rio Largo (the line's northern terminus).

== Background ==
The project has a fund of R$174 million to construct its railway line. The first stage of the project is working with eight cars in the passages Bebedouro/Central Station and Center/Mangabeira. It was later planned to expand operation to cover the route between Maceió and Lourenço Albuquerque.
