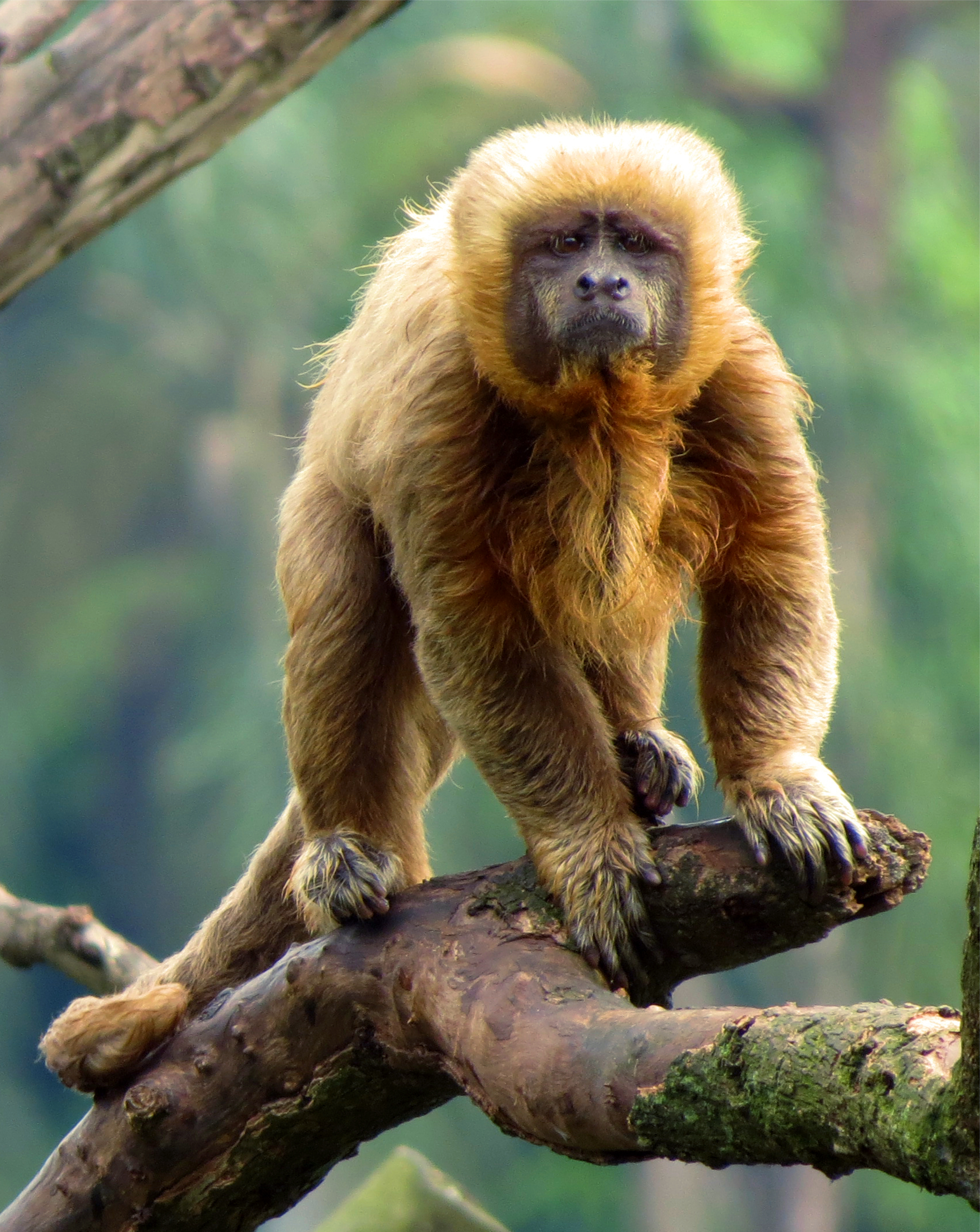

Conservation status
- Endangered (IUCN 3.1)

Scientific classification
- Kingdom: Animalia
- Phylum: Chordata
- Class: Mammalia
- Infraclass: Placentalia
- Order: Primates
- Family: Cebidae
- Genus: Sapajus
- Species: S. flavius

Binomial name
- Sapajus flavius (Schreber, 1774)
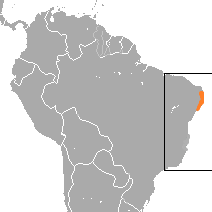
- Blond capuchin range

Synonyms
- Cebus queirozi Mendes Pontes and Malta, 2006

= Blond capuchin =

Species of New World monkey

The blond capuchin (Sapajus flavius) is a species of capuchin monkey endemic to northeastern Brazil. This endangered species was rediscovered in 2006. It can live in exceptionally large groups of over 150 individuals, and like other capuchin species, exhibits a complex and high level of sociality. It is threatened by loss of habitat due to agriculture, primarily sugarcane fields. In many cases this has caused sugarcane to make up a large portion of their diet, which would otherwise consist of mostly fruit and small animals. The blond capuchin is known to inhabit both the Atlantic forest and Caatinga biomes, although the habitation of the Caatinga may be a recent choice caused by human encroachment into its former habitats. Like other primate species, the blond capuchin is also threatened by poaching and capture for the illegal pet trade.

== Classification ==
The blond capuchin was first described as "caitaia" by Georg Marcgrave in 1648. In 1774 Johann Christian Daniel von Schreber posited Simia flavia as an independent species, but it had long lacked any specimen. It was not until in 2006 when researchers made its neotype designation. In their neotype designation article, de Oliveira and Langguth confirmed the consistency of Marcgrave's, Schreber's, and their capuchins, attributed the authority to Schreber, and established a new combination of its scientific name, C. flavius Schreber, 1774.

In the same year, 2006, Mendes Pontes and Malta reported C. queirozi as a new species. However, de Oliveira and his collaborators pointed out the existence of the previous studies, that is, those of Marcgrave and Schreber, as well as the inadequacy of Mendes Pontes and Maldta's designation of the type specimen, and therefore considered C. queirozi to be a junior synonym. Rylands and Mittermeier followed de Oliveira and Langguth's view.

In 2011, Jessica Lynch Alfaro et al. proposed that the robust capuchins such (formerly the C. apella group) be placed in a separate genus, Sapajus, from the gracile capuchins (formerly the C. capucinus group) which retain the genus Cebus.

== Description ==
The body hair of the blond capuchin is almost uniformly golden-yellow with the notable exception of a whitish cap on the front half of the head. It has a pink-coloured face with light-brown eyes and a darkly-coloured, hairless throat flap on the ventral side of its neck. The hair on the feet and hands is much lighter compared to the rest of the coat, while the palms and soles of the feet are hairless and black. The hair on the head grows towards the posterior and is not tufted. The blond capuchin is on the smaller end of capuchin monkeys, reaching a maximum head and body length of 40 cm (16 in). Similar to other capuchin species, the length of the tail is nearly equivalent to the length of the head and body. The typical weight of an adult ranges from 2 to 3 kg (4.4 to 6.6 lb).

== Distribution ==
The blond capuchin inhabits the northeastern Atlantic Forest extended in the states of Paraíba, Pernambuco, and Alagoas in the northeastern part of Brazil. It was rediscovered in two Atlantic Forest fragments in Paraíba, the Camaratuba Experimental Station and the Engenho Gargaú Private Natural Heritage Reserve. Sample animals were captured and examined. In the Gargaú reserve they seemed healthy and were probably a viable population for the next 100 years. The Camaratuba population had a 50% risk of extinction. It has also been seen in the Pau-Brasil Ecological Station in Paraíba, just south of the Camaratuba station.

The blond capuchin is also known to inhabit the Caatinga biome in the state of Rio Grande do Norte located in northeastern Brazil. Although only officially discovered in the mid to late 2000s, local residents claim to have seen them for at least the past 40 years. Locals of the area claim the blond capuchins frequently raid the nearby maize fields, indicating that they may have been forced to move to and adapt to the Caatinga biome due to human activity. Notably, blond capuchins living in the Caatinga spend much more of their time on the ground then populations living in the Atlantic forest.

== Behaviour and ecology ==
=== Social dynamics ===
Blond capuchins live in large, complex social groups that can be made up of over 150 individuals, containing both males and females. Males will typically lead group movements, and will sometimes split into subgroups when foraging. This is believed to reduce competition within the group, as their favoured food, fruits, are often found in clumps that could inspire conflict if too many individuals were to forage from the same clump at the same time. Although both males and females exhibit parental care, females are the primary caregivers of infants and have been observed to be doing the majority of infant carrying. Blond capuchins do not have a mating season, thus mothers can be observed carrying infants of different ages throughout all times of the year. One study observed a mother carrying her dead infant, causing her to fall behind from her group and become exposed to predation, suggesting blond capuchin mothers maintain strong bonds with their children. The mother in this study was guarded by two males, also suggesting that while males may not have much of a direct role in childcare, they may help by protecting mothers and infants from threats.

They use a variety of calls and behaviours to communicate with each other, with one study identifying 29 different call types. Although a few of the call types were shared with other capuchin species, the majority were unique to blond capuchins.

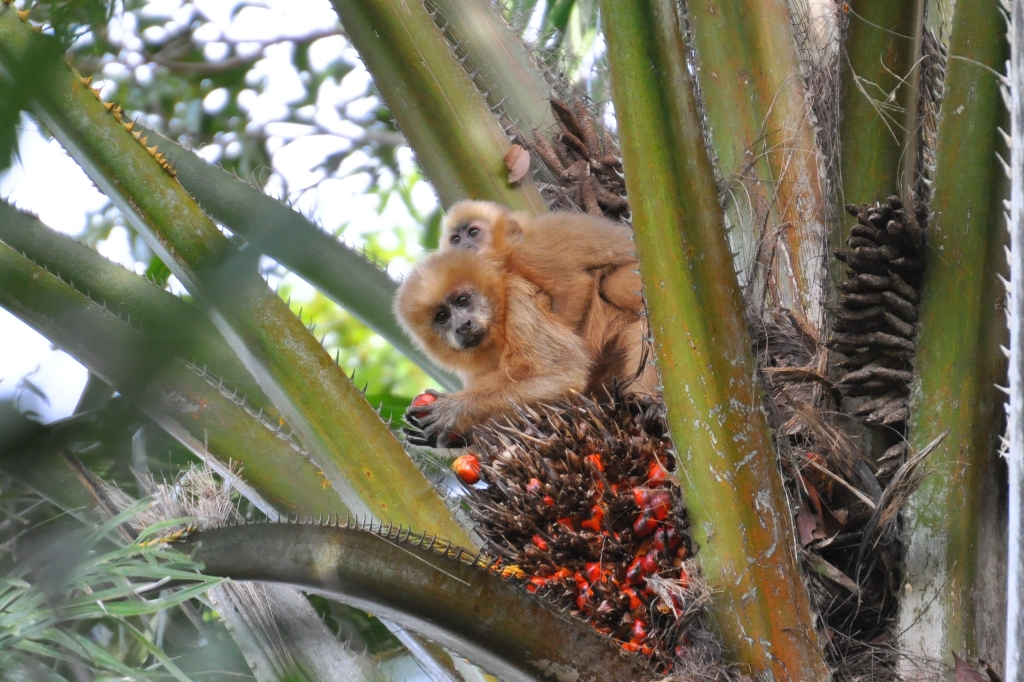
Mother gathering food while her child holds on to her back.

=== Diet ===
Like other capuchin species, the blond capuchin is diurnal and does most of its foraging during the early morning, possibly to avoid harsher midday temperatures. It is an omnivore and feeds on a wide variety of food types including fruits and other vegetable parts, small vertebrates, arthropods, and sugarcane. Notably, sugarcane was found in one study to make up 50% of the blond capuchin's diet, although fruit was the preferred food when available. Sugarcane is obtained by raiding the agricultural sugarcane fields that often surround the forest fragments the blond capuchins inhabit. Within these forest fragments, sugarcane is often more readily available than fruit, but requires significant processing time and effort, thus creating conflict between individuals who gather the sugarcane and individuals who would prefer to steal the processed sugarcane from the gatherers. Blond capuchins suck on the sugarcane rather than eating it, indicating that the consumption of sugarcane is providing caloric intake without much of the nutrition found in other plant foods they would normally consume. A study of a different group of blond capuchins found similarly that the majority of their diet was made up of introduced plants, suggesting that the blond capuchin's ability to adapt to new food sources is a significant contributing factor to their survival in forest fragments isolated by agricultural land.

=== Tool use ===
While tool use is not common in blond capuchins, it has been observed in a few instances. One such instance is the occurrence of termite fishing by blond capuchins inhabiting Atlantic forests. This process involves first finding an arboreal termite nest, finding a stick, putting the stick in the nest, pulling the stick out after a short amount of time, then finally eating the termites on the stick.

Blond capuchins have also been observed rubbing the toxic defensive secretions of Poecilocricus millipedes on themselves. This behaviour was performed by individuals of all ages, done mostly socially, and during mosquito season, suggesting this behaviour serves a dual purpose as a method of social bonding and a method of mosquito repellent. Similar behaviours have been observed in other capuchin species, although the secretions served an anti-parasitic role. Here, individuals were observed applying the secretions to each other's hard-to-reach areas, suggesting the sociality of this behaviour may provide further health and efficacy benefits.

In the Caatinga biome, blond capuchins have been observed using a 'hammer and anvil' method to crack open Manihot nuts, the hammer being a small rock and the anvil being a larger rock.

== Conservation ==
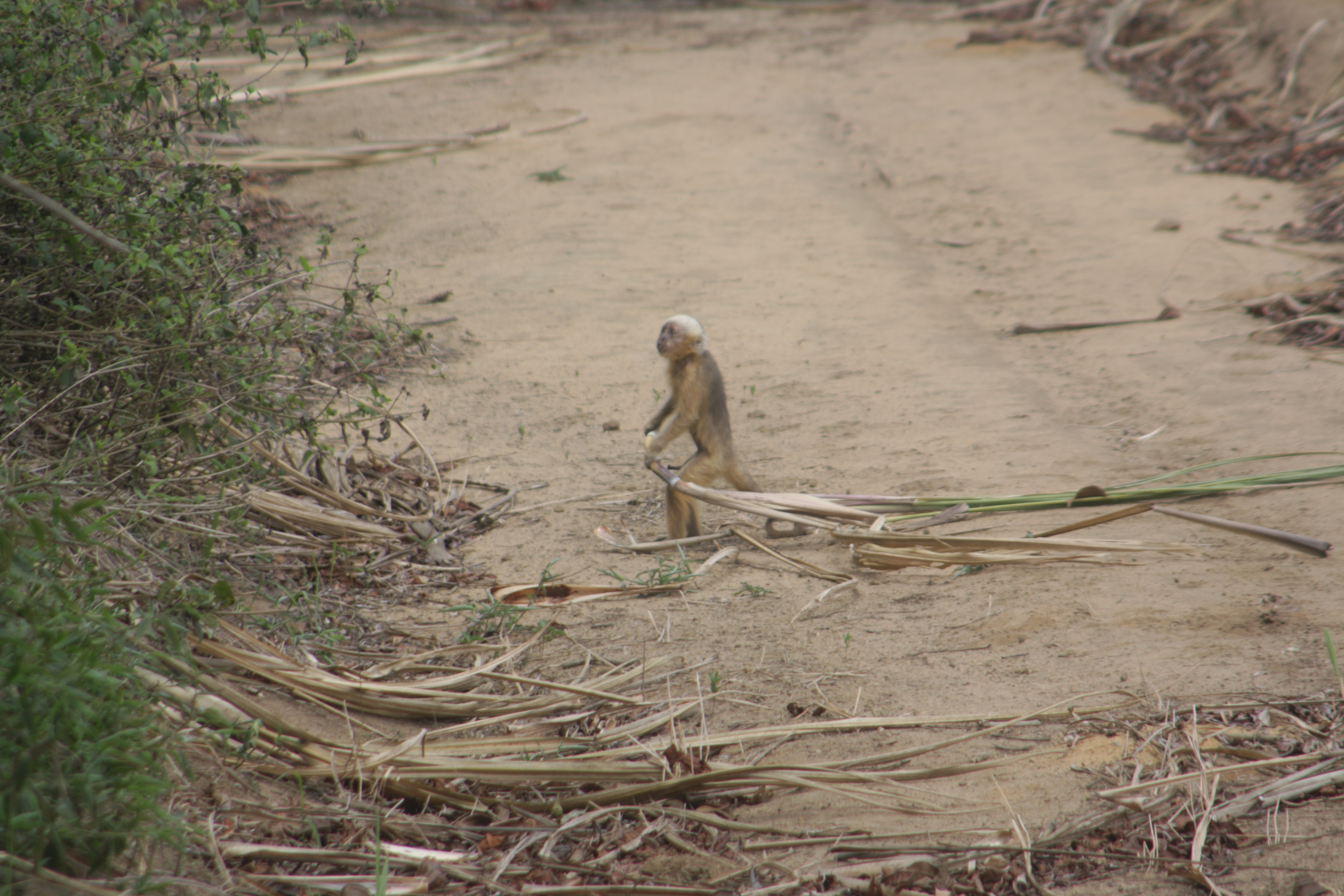
A blond capuchin holding a sugarcane stalk it has retrieved from a nearby sugarcane plantation.

Like many capuchin species, the primary threat facing the blond capuchin is the loss of habitat, either through deforestation in the Atlantic forest habitat or desertification in the Caatinga habitat. Deforestation caused by agriculture and human encroachment has led to reduced population sizes and has forced groups to move from their typically inhabited areas. This has further led to groups of blond capuchins overlapping with other species of capuchins they did not previously encounter, possibly leading to hybridization between the blond capuchin and other capuchin species. Loss of habitat has also caused blond capuchins to live in small forest fragments where they are at higher risk of infectious diseases. One group of blond capuchins was found to have 12% of its individuals containing antibodies for Toxoplasma gondii, and 46% of its individuals carrying microfilariae parasites. Like other species of primates, blond capuchins are threatened by hunting and capture for the pet trade. Blond capuchins have been kept as pets at least as far back as the colonial era, appearing in a 16th century fresco commissioned by Pope Leo X.
