= Guaribas Biological Reserve =

- Reserva Biológica Guaribas
- IUCN category Ia (strict nature reserve)
- Location within Brazil
- Coordinates: 6.715°S 35.181°W
- Area: 4,052 hectares (10,010 acres)
- Designation: biological reserve
- Created: 25 January 1990

Guaribas Biological Reserve (Portuguese: Reserva Biológica Guaribas) is a biological reserve in the state of Paraíba, Brazil.

== Location ==
The 4,052 hectares (10,010 acres) reserve was created on 25 January 1990. It is administered by the Chico Mendes Institute for Biodiversity Conservation. The reserve is in the municipalities of Rio Tinto and Mamanguape in the state of Paraíba. Altitude varies from 120 to 204 metres (394 to 669 ft) above sea level. Average annual rainfall is 1,750 millimetres (69 in). Temperature varies from 18 to 36 °C (64 to 97 °F) with an average of 28 °C (82 °F).

The reserve is on the Borborema Plateau, with slopes that face east and south east. The terrain is flat, with gentle undulations. The reserve contains parts of the basins of the Mamanguape and Camaratuba rivers. It contains the Descanso or Caiana Lagoon, which dries up completely in the dry season.

== Ecology ==
The reserve is in a transition zone between the Atlantic Forest, caatinga and cerrado biomes. The area is mostly forest-covered, although there are some patches of open cerrado vegetation which once stretched to the coast. The area has suffered from the removal of timber in some areas, which are now in the process of regeneration. There have been frequent incursions by people removing timber and gathering fruit. Adult and sapling specimens of Caesalpinia echinata (Brazil wood) are common. Selective illegal logging of this species has opened large clearings in the forest, allowing establishment of pioneer species.

== Conservation ==
The Biological Reserve is a "strict nature reserve" under IUCN protected area category Ia. The purpose is to fully protect the biota and other natural attributes without human interference. Specifically, it is to protect one of the last well-preserved remnants of Atlantic Forest in the north east of Brazil, which may be harboring a variety of plant and animal species, and may play an important role in preserving genetic diversity.

Protected species include white-necked hawk (Buteogallus lacernulatus), oncilla (Leopardus tigrinus), black-cheeked gnateater (Conopophaga melanops), rufous gnateater (Conopophaga lineata), buff-throated purpletuft (Iodopleura pipra), blue-crowned motmot (Momotus momota), scalloped antbird (Myrmeciza ruficauda), spot-winged wood quail (Odontophorus capueira), rusty-margined guan (Penelope superciliaris), golden-spangled piculet (Picumnus exilis), white-throated spadebill (Platyrinchus mystaceus) and plain xenops (Xenops minutus).

== Sources ==
- Reserva Biológica Guaribas (in Portuguese), Chico Mendes Institute for Biodiversity Conservation, archived from the original on 2016-04-22
- Unidade de Conservação: Reserva Biológica Guaribas (in Portuguese), MMA: Ministério do Meio Ambiente
