= Estrada Ferro Recife ao São Francisco =

Brazilian railway company founded in 1852

Estrada de Ferro Recife ao São Francisco
- EFRSF

Overview
- Main region: Pernambuco
- Headquarters: Recife, Brazil
- Dates of operation: 1852–1901
- Successor: Great Western of Brazil Railway

Technical
- Track gauge: 1,600 m
- Length: 124 km

The Estrada Ferro Recife ao São Francisco (EFRSF) or Recife and São Francisco Railway Company was a railway company. Opened in 1858, it was the first railway built in Pernambuco and the second in Brazil.

The initial section went from Cinco Pontas in Recife to Cabo, in the state of Pernambuco, over a length of 31.5 kilometers, on a broad gauge (1.60 meters).

In 1901 the Great Western of Brasil Railway Company, an English company, acquired the concession from EFRSF and other rail companies operating in Pernambuco.
