= Plus FM =

Brazilian radio network

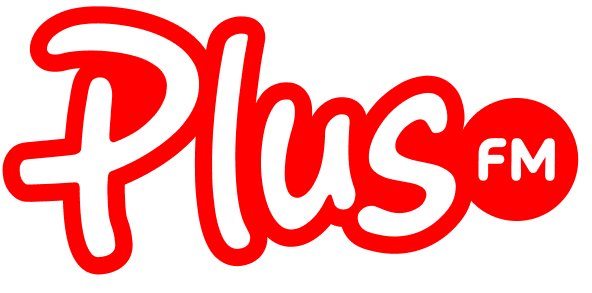
- Type: Broadcast radio network
- Country: Brazil
- Headquarters: Fortaleza, Ceará

Programming
- Language(s): Portuguese
- Format: Music

Ownership
- Owner: Rede Plus Brasil de Comunicação Ltda.
- Operator: Don7 Media Group

History
- Founded: July 23, 2013 by Donizete Arruda

Links
- Website: plusfm.com.br

Plus FM is a Brazilian radio network based in Fortaleza, Ceará. The radio station was founded on March 23, 2013 and belongs to the Don7 Media Group, owned by journalist and businessman Donizete Arruda. The radio network is characterized by its style of popular music programming, reserving space for regional journalism, the main journalistic program being Ceará News, broadcast in the morning. Its stations are concentrated in the state of Ceará, in the municipalities of Aracati, Cascavel, Catarina, Crateús, Missão Velha, Pacajus, Redenção, Iguatu, Paraipaba, Santa Quitéria and Sobral.

== Stations ==
Call sign	Frequency	Trade name	Headquarters / City of license	First air date
ZYS 797	98.1 MHz	Plus FM Aracati	Aracati	2013
ZYE 412	97.1 MHz	Plus FM Cariri	Missão Velha	2023
ZYS 799	106.1 MHz	Plus FM Cascavel	Cascavel	2019
ZYV 818	88.7 MHz	Plus FM Catarina	Catarina	2019
ZYC 416	93.3 MHz	Plus FM Crateús	Crateús	2013
ZYV 362	91.5 MHz	Plus FM Iguatu	Iguatu / Cariús	2014
ZYV 774	99.5 MHz	Plus FM Pacajus	Pacajus / Chorozinho	2017
ZYV 352	88.7 MHz	Plus FM Paraipaba	Paraipaba	2013
ZYC 430	98.7 MHz	Plus FM Redenção	Redenção	2013
ZYV 370	106.5 MHz	Plus FM Santa Quitéria	Santa Quitéria	2017
ZYS 818	105.1 MHz	Plus FM Sobral	Sobral	2013

=== Former stations ===
Call sign	Frequency	Trade name	Headquarters / City of license	Current status/affiliation	Transmission period
ZYV 822	100.5 MHz	Plus FM Cariri	Juazeiro do Norte / Crato	Rede Aleluia	2018-2023
ZYV 830	94.5 MHz	Plus FM Baturité	Baturité	Replaced by 94 FM.	2013-2014
ZYS 809	90.9 MHz	Plus FM Iguatu	Jucás	Replaced by Jucás FM.	2013-2014

== Controversy ==
On June 14, 2018, the Official Gazette of the Municipality of Sobral published Decree No. 2055, signed by Mayor Ivo Gomes, expropriating the land on which the headquarters of the Plus FM branch in Sobral is located. At the time, the action was part of the Alto do Cristo urbanization project, which provided for the requalification of the Alto do Cristo region. The decree was defined as "dictatorial" by the website Ceará News 7, which belongs to the group that controls the radio station, since it would attack stations that are critical of Ivo Gomes' management, in this case Plus FM and Paraíso FM, which also received a decree of expropriation of land.
