= List of suburban and commuter rail systems =

This is an alphabetical listing of cities and countries that have commuter or suburban railways that are currently operational and in service. Commuter and suburban rail systems are train services that connect city centres with outer suburbs or nearby cities, with most passengers traveling for work or school. Unlike metros or light rail these systems usually operate on main line tracks unsegregated from other rail traffic. They differ from regional rail in that they usually have a hub-and-spoke paradigm and are focused on moving large number of passengers to a central business district.

== Africa ==
Country	City or area	Name	External link	Lines	Stations	Length (km)	Daily ridership
Algeria	Algiers	Algiers suburban rail network	SNTF	7	44	212	91,000 (2018)
Botswana	Gaborone - Lobatse	BR Express (Botswana Railways)		1	3		
Egypt	Cairo	Cairo Light Rail Transit (Note: Cairo Train classified as light rail and use the Commuter rail tram-train as metro system.)		1	12	70	
Kenya	Nairobi	Nairobi rail service		4	23	160	9,400
Morocco	Casablanca	Al Bidaoui	ONCF	2	11	32.0	
Nigeria	Abuja	Abuja Light Rail		1			
Senegal	Dakar	Train Express Regional (TER)	TER	1	14	55	50,000 (2022)
Senegal	Dakar-Thiès	Petit train de banlieue	http://www.au-senegal.com/Le-chemin-de-fer.html	1			
South Africa	Cape Town	Metrorail Western Cape	Metrorail	4	122	423	500,000
South Africa	Durban	Metrorail KwaZulu-Natal	Metrorail	8	99		
South Africa	East London	Metrorail Eastern Cape	Metrorail	1	18		
South Africa	Johannesburg/Pretoria	Metrorail Gauteng	Metrorail	12			
South Africa	Johannesburg/Pretoria	Gautrain	Gautrain	2	10	80	
South Africa	Port Elizabeth	Metrorail Eastern Cape	Metrorail	1	10		
Tanzania	Dar es Salaam	Dar es Salaam commuter rail	Tazarasite.com	2	23	45	16,000
Tunisia	Tunis	TGM	TransTu	1	18	19	
Tunisia	Tunis	SNCFT		1		23.2	
Tunisia	Tunis	Réseau Ferroviaire Rapide		3	32	40	
Tunisia	Sahel	Sahel Metro		1	29	73	

== Asia ==
Country	City or area	Name	External link	Lines	Stations	Length (km)	Daily ridership
Azerbaijan	Baku	Baku suburban railway	Azerbaijan Railways Official Site	2	15	91	30,300
China	Beijing	Beijing Suburban Railway		4	22	364.7	
China	Changsha	Changsha–Zhuzhou–Xiangtan intercity railway		1	21	97.6	
China	Chengdu	Chengdu Commuter Rail		2	33	194.3	
China	Guiyang	Guiyang railway loop line		1	17	113	
China	Haikou	Haikou Suburban Rail		1	7	51.4	
China	Lanzhou	Lanzhou–Zhongchuan Airport intercity railway		1	6	61	
China	Ningbo	Ningbo Suburban Railway		1	3	48.7	
China	Pearl River Delta	Pearl River Delta Metropolitan Region intercity railway		7	80 (Note: Not including the 25 stations of the Guangfo Metro.)	379.034 (Note: The 39.6 km Guangfo Metro is not included.)	
China	Shanghai	Shanghai Suburban Railway		2	15	114.978	
China	Shaoxing	Shaoxing Tourism New Transit railway		1	5	80.2	
China	Taizhou	Taizhou Urban Train		2	5	104.338	
Hong Kong (Note: A "special administrative region" of the People's Republic of China since 1997.)	Hong Kong	MTR (Note: In the MTR system, East Rail line, Tuen Ma line, and Tung Chung line are classified as suburban railways. The rest of the system mostly provide metro services.)	MTR	5	58	119.7	1,877,400
India	Chennai	Chennai Suburban Railway		8	300	1,174.21	1,500,000
India	Lucknow - Kanpur	Lucknow-Kanpur Suburban Railway		2	16	72	80,000
India	Delhi	Delhi Suburban Railway				35	3,700
India	Hyderabad	Hyderabad MMTS		3	29	50	220,000
India	Kolkata	Kolkata Suburban Railway	Eastern Railway	24	458	1501	6,100,000
India	Pune	Pune Suburban Railway		2	29	64	100,000
India	Mumbai	Mumbai Suburban Railway	Mumbai Railway Vikas Corporation	7	154	465	7,585,000
Indonesia	Jakarta (Greater Jakarta) (Note: Include regency of Lebak, Karawang, and Purwakarta.)	KRL Commuterline	KAI Commuter	5	80	293.4	1,200,000
Indonesia	Jakarta (Greater Jakarta)	Soekarno–Hatta Airport Rail Link	Railink	1	5	54.3	4,100
Indonesia	Jakarta (Greater Jakarta)	Merak Commuter Line		1	13	68.5	
Indonesia	Jakarta (Greater Jakarta)	Jatiluhur and Walahar Commuter Line		1	10	60	
Indonesia	Bandung (Greater Bandung)	Greater Bandung Commuter Line	KAI Commuter	1	14	42	75,070
Indonesia	Bandung (Greater Bandung)	Garut Commuter Line		1	33		
Indonesia	Semarang (Greater Semarang)	Kedungsepur		1	8	60	
Indonesia	Surabaya (Greater Surabaya)	Greater Surabaya Commuter Line	KAI Commuter	8			52,502
Indonesia	Medan (Greater Medan)	Sri Lelawangsa		1	7	21	15,586
Indonesia	Medan (Greater Medan)	Kualanamu Airport Rail Link	Railink	1	2	40	
Indonesia	Padang (Greater Padang)	Minangkabau Express		1	8	23	
Indonesia	Yogyakarta–Surakarta	Adisumarmo Airport Rail Link		1	5	13.5	
Indonesia	Yogyakarta–Surakarta	Prambanan Express		1	5	64	
Indonesia	Yogyakarta–Surakarta	Yogyakarta International Airport Rail Link		1	4		
Indonesia	Yogyakarta–Surakarta	KRL Commuterline Yogyakarta–Solo		1	13	65.4	29,744
Iran	Tehran	Tehran Metro Line 5	Urban & Suburban Railway Operation Co	1	11	41.5	
Israel	Tel Aviv, Haifa, Jerusalem, Beersheba	Israel Railways	Israel Railways	11	69	1221	225,000
Japan	Fukui	Echizen Railway	JP	2	44	53	
Japan	Fukuoka-Kitakyushu	JR Kyushu	JA EN	11	175	464.3	
Japan	Fukuoka-Kitakyushu	Nishi-Nippon Railroad (Nishitetsu)	JA EN	4	72	106.1	542,994
Japan	Fukuoka-Kitakyushu	Amagi Railway	JA	1	11	13.7	3,700
Japan	Fukuoka-Kitakyushu	Heisei Chikuhō Railway		3	35	49.2	
Japan	Hiroshima	JR West		4	76	247.8	
Japan	Kanazawa	Hokuriku Railroad (Hokutetsu) (Note: Most of this company's once-extensive rail lines have closed, and this company now primarily functions as a bus operator on its former railway routes.)	JP	2	29	20.6	
Japan	Matsuyama	Iyotetsu	JP	3 (Note: The Takahama Line and the Yokogawara Line now operate as a single line, which means that a train goes directly from Takahama Station to Yokogawara Station via Matsuyama City Station, yet they're still counted as two separate lines.)	35	33.9	
Japan	Nagano	Nagano Electric Railway (Nagaden)	JP	1	24	33.2	
Japan	Nagoya (Chūkyō Area)	JR Central	JA EN	10	138	465.2	
Japan	Nagoya (Chūkyō Area)	Aichi Loop Line (Aikan)	JA	1	23	45.3	38,759
Japan	Nagoya (Chūkyō Area)	Johoku Line (TKJ)	JA	1	6	11.2	1,384
Japan	Nagoya (Chūkyō Area)	Kinki Nippon Electric Railway (Kintetsu) (Note: Only Nagoya Line and its branches, and Yamada/Toba/Shima Line)	JA EN	6	89	168.4	
Japan	Nagoya (Chūkyō Area)	Nagoya Railroad (Meitetsu)	JA EN+map	20	275	443.8	
Japan	Nagoya (Chūkyō Area)	Nagoya Seaside Rapid Railway (Aonami Line)	JA+map	1	11	15.2	43,888
Japan	Nagoya (Chūkyō Area)	Sangi Railway	JA	2	29	48	
Japan	Nagoya (Chūkyō Area)	Toyohashi Railroad (Toyotetsu)	JA	1 (Note: Only the Atsumi Line is a commuter railway, the other line that Toyotetsu operates, the Azumada Main Line, is a tram line.)	16	18	
Japan	Niigata	JR East		6	58	177.9	
Japan	Okayama-Kurashiki	JR West		8	117	417.5	
Japan	Okayama-Kurashiki	Mizushima Rinkai Railway	JP	1	10	11.2	
Japan	Osaka-Kobe-Kyoto (Keihanshin Area)	JR West Urban Network	JA EN	25	361	985.7	
Japan	Osaka-Kobe-Kyoto (Keihanshin Area)	Hankyu Railway	JA EN+map	9	91	136	1,950,000
Japan	Osaka-Kobe-Kyoto (Keihanshin Area)	Hanshin Electric Railway	JA EN	3	46	43.9	
Japan	Osaka-Kobe-Kyoto (Keihanshin Area)	Hokushin Kyuko Electric Railway	JA	1	2	7.5	
Japan	Osaka-Kobe-Kyoto (Keihanshin Area)	Keihan Electric Railway	JA EN	7	88	90.7	
Japan	Osaka-Kobe-Kyoto (Keihanshin Area)	Kinki Nippon Electric Railway (Kintetsu) (Note: Except Nagoya Line and its branches, and Yamada/Toba/Shima Line)	JA EN	15	185	302.5	
Japan	Osaka-Kobe-Kyoto (Keihanshin Area)	Kita-Osaka Kyuko Railway (Kitakyu)	JA+map EN+map	1	4	5.9	
Japan	Osaka-Kobe-Kyoto (Keihanshin Area)	Kobe Electric Railway (Shintetsu)	JA	4	46	69.2	160,900
Japan	Osaka-Kobe-Kyoto (Keihanshin Area)	Kobe Rapid Railway (Note: The company itself does not own any rolling stocks, instead it provides through service for 4 other railway companies (Shintetsu, Hanshin, Hankyu, and Sanyo) into Kobe city center.)	JA	2	11	7.6	
Japan	Osaka-Kobe-Kyoto (Keihanshin Area)	Nankai Electric Railway	JA	8	99	157.9	586,866
Japan	Osaka-Kobe-Kyoto (Keihanshin Area)	Nose Electric Railway	JA	2	15	14.8	
Japan	Osaka-Kobe-Kyoto (Keihanshin Area)	Sanyo Electric Railway	JA	2	49	63.2	
Japan	Sapporo	JR Hokkaido	JA EN	3	55	168.7	
Japan	Sendai	JR East	JA EN	5	86	252	
Japan	Sendai	Sendai Airport Transit	JP	1	4	7.1	6,670
Japan	Shizuoka-Hamamatsu	JR Central		3	70	268.4	
Japan	Takamatsu	Takamatsu-Kotohira Electric Railroad	JA	3	52	60	
Japan	Tokyo (Greater Tokyo Area)	JR East	JA EN	43	623	2282.8	16,359,962
Japan	Tokyo (Greater Tokyo Area)	Hakone Tozan Line (Note: As the name "Tozan", or "mountain-climbing", indicates, this line is a primary scenic railway for the Fuji-Hakone-Izu National Park uphill. However, Odakyu commuter trains operate on the section from Odawara to Hakone-Yumoto, thus only this section should be considered as commuter rail.)	JA	1	11 (Note: 5, if only the section from Odawara to Hakone-Yumoto is counted.)	15 (Note: 6.1, if only the section from Odawara to Hakone-Yumoto is counted.)	
Japan	Tokyo (Greater Tokyo Area)	Hokuso Railway	JA EN	1	15	32.3	108,680
Japan	Tokyo (Greater Tokyo Area)	Izuhakone Railway	JA	1 (Note: The Daiyūzan Line serves Odawara, a city inside the Greater Tokyo; the other line Sunzu Line serves Mishima, which is outside Greater Tokyo.)	12	9.6	
Japan	Tokyo (Greater Tokyo Area)	Kanto Railway	JA	2	28	55.6	
Japan	Tokyo (Greater Tokyo Area)	Keihin Electric Express Railway (Keikyu)	JA EN	5	77	87	1,316,499
Japan	Tokyo (Greater Tokyo Area)	Keio Corporation	JA EN	6	69	88.3	1,851,364
Japan	Tokyo (Greater Tokyo Area)	Keisei Electric Railway	JA EN	6	69	152.8	786,063
Japan	Tokyo (Greater Tokyo Area)	Metropolitan Intercity Railway Company (Tsukuba Express)	JA EN	1	20	58.3	431,060
Japan	Tokyo (Greater Tokyo Area)	Nagareyama Line (Ryūden)	JA	1	6	5.7	
Japan	Tokyo (Greater Tokyo Area)	Odakyu Electric Railway	JA EN	3	80	120.5	2,069,383
Japan	Tokyo (Greater Tokyo Area)	Sagami Railway (Sotetsu)	JA EN	2	28	35.9	634,899
Japan	Tokyo (Greater Tokyo Area)	Saitama Railway	JA EN+map	1	8	14.6	
Japan	Tokyo (Greater Tokyo Area)	Seibu Railway	JA EN	12	92	176.6	1,804,521
Japan	Tokyo (Greater Tokyo Area)	Tobu Railway	JA EN	13	204	463.3	2,522,067
Japan	Tokyo (Greater Tokyo Area)	Tokyu Corporation	JA EN	7 (Note: Tokyu corporation owns 8 lines in total, but the Setagaya Line is not included here since it is classified as a light rail line; Tokyu also operates Kodomonokuni Line, which is owned by Yokohama Minatomirai Railway)	86	100.3	3,171,660
Japan	Tokyo (Greater Tokyo Area)	Toyo Rapid Railway	JA EN	1	9	16.2	133,000
Japan	Toyama	Toyama Chihō Railway (Chitetsu)	JA	3 (Note: The Fujikoshi Line and the Kamidaki Line now operate as one line.)	66	93.2	
Kazakhstan	Almaty	Elektrichka	"EN map".				
Malaysia	Greater Johor Bahru	KTM Komuter Southern Shuttle		2	8	150.1	
Malaysia	Greater Kuala Lumpur	KTM Komuter	KTM Berhad	3	56	269	120,389
Malaysia	Greater Kuala Lumpur	Express Rail Link	KLIA Ekspres	2	8	110.1	17,634
Malaysia	Greater Kota Kinabalu	Western Sabah Railway Line	Sabah State Railway Berhad	1	15	134	
Malaysia	Greater Penang	KTM Komuter Northern Sector	KTM Berhad	2	20	272	
Myanmar	Yangon	Yangon Circular Railway		1	39	45.9	100,000-150,000
Philippines	Naga, Legazpi	Philippine National Railways Bicol Commuter	PNR	1			
South Korea	Busan	Korail Donghae Line (Note: Only the urban section between Bujeon station and Taehwagang station)	EN	1	23	65.7	51,097
South Korea	Daegu	Korail Daegyeong Line		1	8	61.8	
South Korea	Seoul Capital Area	AREX	KO	1	14	63.8	182,343
South Korea	Seoul Capital Area	Great Train eXpress	KO	1	9	81.1	
South Korea	Seoul Capital Area	Korail	KO EN	8	260	591.4	3,197,423
Sri Lanka	Colombo	Sri Lanka Railways		18	201	1,436	301,894
Taiwan	Greater Taipei-Taoyuan-Hsinchu	Taiwan Railway	TRA	4			
Taiwan	Taichung	Taiwan Railway	TRA	2			
Taiwan	Tainan-Kaohsiung	Taiwan Railway	TRA	1			
Thailand	Bangkok (Bangkok Metropolitan Region)	Greater Bangkok Commuter rail	State Railway of Thailand	5	21	623	
Thailand	Bangkok (Bangkok Metropolitan Region)	SRT Red Lines		2	11	41.26	
Thailand	Bangkok (Bangkok Metropolitan Region)	Airport Rail Link	Airport Rail Link	1	7	28.6	47,000
Turkey	Adapazarı	Adaray		1	7	8.4	
Turkey	Ankara	Başkentray		1	26	37	
Turkey	Aydın	AYBAN		1	8	29.5	
Turkey	Istanbul	Marmaray	Marmaray	1	43	76.6	148,034
Turkey	İzmir	İZBAN		2	41	136	185,000
Turkey	Gaziantep	Gaziray		1	16	25.5	

== Europe ==
Country	City or area	Name	External link	Lines	Stations	Length (km)	Daily ridership
Austria	Graz	S-Bahn Steiermark	Graz-Köflacher Bahn (GKB) ÖBB Steiermärkische Landesbahnen (StB)	11	112	450	45,520
Austria / Germany / Italy	Innsbruck	Tyrol S-Bahn	ÖBB	6	68	271	42,000
Austria / Italy	Klagenfurt	S-Bahn Kärnten	ÖBB	4	82	325	
Austria	Linz	S-Bahn Oberösterreich	S-Bahn OberösterreichLILOÖBB	5	62	172	
Austria / Germany	Salzburg	Salzburg S-Bahn	Berchtesgadener Land Bahn (BLB)ÖBBSalzburger Lokalbahn (SLB)	5	64	130	
Austria	Vienna	S-Bahn Wien	ÖBB S-Bahn Wien	10	181	475	300,000
Austria / Liechtenstein / Germany / Switzerland	Vorarlberg	S-Bahn Vorarlberg (in part Bodensee S-Bahn)	Montafonerbahn ÖBB Bodensee S-Bahn	6	46	80	
Belgium	Antwerp	S-trein Antwerpen	NMBS	4			
Belgium	Brussels	Brussels S Train		12	120	350	68,500
Belgium	Charleroi	Charleroi RER	SNCB	4	63		
Belgium	Ghent	S-trein Gent	NMBS	3			
Belgium	Liège	Liège RER	SNCB	4	35		
Croatia	Split	Split Suburban Railway		1	7	17.8	156
Croatia	Zagreb	Zagreb Commuter Rail		1	19	47	
Czech Republic	Prague	Esko Prague		33	295	933	110,000
Czech Republic	Ostrava	Esko Moravian-Silesian Region		10			
Denmark	Aalborg	Aalborg Commuter Rail	DSB	1	7	27	
Denmark	Copenhagen	S-train^{1}	S-tog	7	85	170	357,000
Estonia	Tallinn	Tallinn commuter rail	Elron	11	62	259	
Finland	Helsinki	Helsinki commuter rail^{1}	VR commuter rail	14	55	236	200,000
Finland	Tampere	Tampere commuter rail	Nysse	2	20		
France	Lille	TER Hauts-De-France	SNCF	12	363		
France	Paris	Réseau Express Régional (RER)^{1}	RATP	5	257	602	3,290,000
France	Paris	Transilien	Transilien	15	383	1299	3,520,700
France	Toulouse	Toulouse railway network	Tisséo	2	10		
Germany / France	Offenburg/Strasbourg	Ortenau S-Bahn	SWEG	4		170	
Germany	Berlin	Berlin S-Bahn^{1}	S-Bahn Berlin GmbH	15	166	335.2	1,500,000
Germany	Bremen	Bremen Regional S-Bahn	NordWestBahn	4	56	270	
Germany	Dresden	Dresden S-Bahn	DB Regio	3	46	166	36,000
Germany	Frankfurt/Mainz/Wiesbaden (Frankfurt Rhine-Main area)	Rhine-Main S-Bahn^{1}	DB Regio	9	108	303	400,000
Germany	Freiburg im Breisgau	Breisgau S-Bahn	DB Regio	8		190	
Germany	Hamburg	Hamburg S-Bahn^{1}	S-Bahn Hamburg GmbH Hamburger Verkehrsverbund	6	68	144	605,000
Germany	Hanover	Hanover S-Bahn	DB Regio	8	74	385	82191
Germany	Leipzig/Halle	Mitteldeutschland S-Bahn^{1}	DB RegioS-Bahn Mitteldeutschland	7	104	839	90,000
Germany	Magdeburg	Mittelelbe S-Bahn	DB Regio	1	22	130	5479
Germany	Mannheim/Heidelberg/Karlsruhe	RheinNeckar S-Bahn	DB Regio	5	77	437	75,000
Germany	Munich	Munich S-Bahn^{1}	DB RegioMVV	8	148	434	800,000
Germany	Nuremberg	Nuremberg S-Bahn	DB Regio	4	78	320	40,000
Germany	Ruhr Area/Cologne/Düsseldorf	Cologne S-Bahn	DB Regio	4	65	239	
Germany	Ruhr Area/Cologne/Düsseldorf	Rhein-Ruhr S-Bahn	AbellioDB RegioRegio-Bahn	11	181	475	356,000
Germany	Villingen-Schwenningen/Tuttlingen	Ringzug	SWEG	6	46	194	
Germany	Rostock	Rostock S-Bahn	DB Regio	3	24	90.7	
Germany	Stuttgart	Stuttgart S-Bahn^{1}	Stuttgart S-Bahn	6	75	215	435,000
Germany	Ulm	Danube-Iller Regional S-Bahn	Regio S-Bahn	7	55	388	
Greece	Athens	Athens Suburban Railway (Proastiakos)	Athens Suburban Railway	4	45	292	30,000
Greece	Thessaloniki	Proastiakos Thessaloniki	Proastiakos Thessaloniki	2	25	248.9	
Greece	Patras	Proastiakos Patras	Proastiakos Patras	2	16	29	4,400
Hungary	Budapest	BHÉV	MÁV-HÉV Zrt.	5	79	101	200,000
Hungary	Budapest	Suburban trains in Budapest		14	333		172,000
Ireland	Dublin (Greater Dublin Area)	Dublin Area Rapid Transit	Iarnród Éireann	2	32	53	81,905
Ireland	Dublin (Greater Dublin Area)	Dublin Suburban Rail	Iarnród Éireann	5	77		40,000
Ireland	Cork	Cork Suburban Rail	Iarnród Éireann	3	10		5,975
Ireland	Galway	Galway Suburban Rail	Iarnród Éireann	1	3		
Ireland	Limerick	Limerick Suburban Rail	Iarnród Éireann	3	7		
Italy	Bari	Bari metropolitan railway service	FNB; Ferrovie	2	13		
Italy	Bologna	Bologna metropolitan railway service	SFM Bologna	8	82	350	82,076
Italy	Catanzaro	Servizio ferroviario metropolitano di Catanzaro		1	11	11.1	
Italy	Milan	Milan suburban railway service^{1}	Trenord	11	123	403	230,000
Italy	Naples	Naples metropolitan railway service^{1}	EAV and Trenitalia	8	129	184.2	
Italy	Palermo	Palermo metropolitan railway service	Trenitalia	2	17	39	
Italy	Rome	FL lines	Trenitalia	8	128	672	372,000
Italy	Rome	Rome–Lido railway^{1}		1	14	28	90,000
Italy	Rome	Rome–Civita Castellana–Viterbo railway (Note: Only the urban section between Piazzale Flaminio station and Montebello station)		1	7	12.77	
Italy	Turin	Turin metropolitan railway service	Torino Ferrovie GTT Trenitalia	7	85		
Italy	Salerno	Salerno metropolitan railway service	Trenitalia	1	6	6	
Latvia	Riga	Vivi	Map	4	80	248.5	
Lithuania	Kaunas	Elektrichka	Map				
Lithuania	Vilnius	Elektrichka	Map				
Norway	Bergen	Bergen Commuter Rail /Vy Gjøvikbanen	Vy	2	28	135	
Norway	Oslo	Oslo Commuter Rail	Ruter	2	48	92	
Norway	Stavanger	Jæren Commuter Rail	Kolumbus	1	18	75	7,000
Norway	Trondheim	Trønderbanen	SJ	2	35	290	3 300
Poland	Bydgoszcz, Toruń	Szybka kolej miejska BiTCity	Polregio	1	13		
Poland	Kraków	Lesser Poland Railways	Lesser Poland Railways	1	9	14	
Poland	Kraków	Szybka Kolej Aglomeracyjna w Aglomeracji Krakowskiej	Lesser Poland Railways	3			
Poland	Łódź	Łódź Agglomeration Railway	Łódź Agglomeration Railway	4	61		
Poland	Poznań	Poznańska Kolej Metropolitalna	PKM	5			
Poland	Silesia	Szybka Kolej Regionalna	KS	1	13	29	
Poland	Tricity Area	Szybka Kolej Miejska w Trójmieście (Tricity Rapid City Rail)^{1}	Szybka Kolej Miejska	1	27		
Poland	Tricity Area	Pomorska Kolej Metropolitalna	Pomorska Kolej Metropolitalna	1	11	19.5	
Poland	Warsaw	Masovian Railways	Masovian Railways	8		1266	170,151
Poland	Warsaw	Szybka Kolej Miejska	SKM Warszawa	5	46		77,000
Poland	Warsaw	Warszawska Kolej Dojazdowa	WKD	1	28		23,500
Poland	Wrocław	Lower Silesian Agglomeration Railway	KD	1	23 (Note: The number of stations and stops in the large agglomeration – 77 The number of active stations and stops in the large agglomeration – 70 The number of stations and stops in the small agglomeration – 26 The number of active stations and stops in the small agglomeration – 23)		
Portugal	Coimbra	CP Urban Services	CP (in English)	1	20		
Portugal	Lisbon	CP Urban Services	CP (in English)	4	67		
Portugal	Lisbon	Fertagus	Fertagus (in Portuguese)	1	14	54	
Portugal	Porto	CP Urban Services	CP (in English)	4	78		
Romania	Bucharest	CFR Săgeata Albastră	Căile Ferate Române (in Romanian)	1	4	20	2,750
Russia	Moscow	Moscow Suburban Railway		13	749	2384.7	2,739,726
Russia	Moscow	Moscow Central Diameters	MCD (in Russian)	2	66	132	
Russia	Moscow	Aeroexpress	Aeroexpress	3	9		
Russia	Yekaterinburg	Yekaterinburg City Rail	SPK (in Russian)	2	14	70	
Russia	Nizhny Novgorod	Nizhny Novgorod City Rail	NNCR (in Russian)	3	27	71.2	
Serbia	Belgrade	BG Voz	City of Belgrade – Secretariat for Public Transport (in Serbian)	2	21	31.3	35,000
Spain	Alicante/Murcia	Cercanías Murcia/Alicante	Cercanías Murcia/Alicante	4	40	220	9,000
Spain	Barcelona	Rodalies Barcelona^{1}	Cercanías Barcelona	19	228	615	350,000
Spain	Bilbao	Cercanías Bilbao	Cercanías Bilbao	4	63	100	40,000
Spain	Bilbao	Euskotren Trena	Euskotren	3	79		23,000
Spain	Cádiz/Jerez de la Frontera	Cercanías Cádiz	Cercanías Cádiz	2	13	61	18,000
Spain	Ferrol	Cercanías Galicia	Cercanías Ferrol	1	24	53	75
Spain	León	Cercanías León	Cercanías León	1	44	98,3	350
Spain	Madrid	Cercanías Madrid^{1}	Cercanías Madrid	10	90	370	880,000
Spain	Málaga	Cercanías Málaga	Cercanías Málaga	2	26	70	44,000
Spain	Palma de Mallorca	Serveis Ferroviaris de Mallorca		3	29	85	30,684
Spain	Oviedo/Gijón	Cercanías Asturias	Cercanías Asturias	9	143	383	24,000
Spain	Santander	Cercanías Cantabria	Cercanías Cantabria	3	27	92	14,500
Spain	San Sebastián	Cercanías San Sebastián	Cercanías San Sebastián	1	30	80.5	19,700
Spain	Seville	Cercanías Sevilla	Cercanías Sevilla	5	37	251	25.0
Spain	Valencia	Cercanías Valencia	Cercanías Valencia	6	66	252	57,534
Spain	Zaragoza	Cercanías Zaragoza	Cercanías Zaragoza	1	6	16.6	1164
Sweden	Gothenburg	Gothenburg commuter rail		3	25	104	60,000
Sweden	Linköping/Norrköping	Östergötland commuter rail	Östgötatrafiken	1	11	115	9,000
Sweden	Scania	Pågatågen	Skånetrafiken	6	78	388	50,000
Sweden	Stockholm	Stockholm commuter rail^{1}	SL	4	53	241	410,000
Sweden	Stockholm	Roslagsbanan and Saltsjöbanan	SL	5	56	83	70,000
Switzerland	Aargau	Aargau S-Bahn	AAR Bus+Bahn	6	78		
Switzerland / Germany / France	Basel (Trinational Eurodistrict of Basel)	Basel S-Bahn	Regio-S-Bahn Basel	5	72	250	65,000
Switzerland	Bern	Bern S-Bahn	Bern S-Bahn	13	134		175,000
Switzerland	Chur	Chur S-Bahn	Rhaetian Railway	2	22	53	
Switzerland	Fribourg	RER Fribourg	RER Fribourg	7			
Switzerland / France	Geneva (Grand Genève)	Léman Express	CFF and SNCF	6	45	230	
Switzerland / France	Jura	RER Jura	RER Jura	4	16		
Switzerland	Lausanne	RER Vaud	RER Vaud	10	75		
Switzerland	Lucerne	Lucerne S-Bahn	S-Bahn Luzern	9			
Switzerland / Germany	Schaffhausen	Schaffhausen S-Bahn (in part Bodensee S-Bahn)	Schaffhausen S-Bahn Bodensee S-Bahn	3	16		
Switzerland / Germany / Austria	St. Gallen	St. Gallen S-Bahn (in part Bodensee S-Bahn)	St. Gallen S-Bahn Bodensee S-Bahn	23	188		
Switzerland / Germany	Zurich (Zurich Metropolitan Area)	Zürich S-Bahn	ZVV	28	171	380	456,073
Switzerland	Zug	Zug Stadtbahn		2			
Ukraine	Kyiv	Kyiv Urban Electric Train		1	15	50	32,000
United Kingdom	Belfast	Belfast Suburban Rail (NI Railways)	NI Railways	4	44		
United Kingdom	Birmingham	West Midlands Trains	Centro, Network West Midlands	9	146	867.4	
United Kingdom	Bristol	MetroWest	MetroWest				
United Kingdom	Cardiff	South Wales Metro		9	94	169	
United Kingdom	Edinburgh	ScotRail	First ScotRail				
United Kingdom	Glasgow	ScotRail^{1}	First ScotRail		341	3032	
United Kingdom	Greater Manchester				98	229	
United Kingdom	Liverpool	Merseyrail^{1}	Merseyrail, Merseytravel	2	68	120.7	110,000
United Kingdom	Leeds	MetroTrain	MetroTrain				
United Kingdom	Greater London	c2c	c2c	3	28	128.7	
United Kingdom	Greater London	Chiltern Railway	Chiltern Railways		62	336.4	
United Kingdom	Greater London	Great Western Railway	Great Western Railway		270	2129.2	
United Kingdom	Greater London	TSGN^{1}	TSGN		129	778.9	
United Kingdom	Greater London	Greater Anglia	Abellio Greater Anglia		168		
United Kingdom	Greater London	London Overground^{1}	London Overground	9	112	167	517,808
United Kingdom	Greater London	Southern	Southern Railway	12	67		
United Kingdom	Greater London	South Western Railway	South Western Railway	14	90		
United Kingdom	Greater London	London & South Eastern Railway	London & South Eastern Railway	15	74		
United Kingdom	Greater London	Elizabeth Line^{1}	Elizabeth line	4	23	59	

== North America ==
Country	City or area	Name	External link	Lines	Stations	Length (km)	Daily ridership
Canada	Montreal	Exo commuter rail	Exo	5	61	224.6	83,100
Canada	Toronto	GO Transit	Go Transit	7	70	526	216,000
Canada	Toronto	Union Pearson Express	UP Express	1	5	23.3	10,091
Canada	Vancouver	West Coast Express	West Coast Express	1	8	69	11,300
Costa Rica	San José	Interurbano Line		3	32	72	
Cuba	Havana	Havana Suburban Railway		8			
Mexico	Mexico City	Tren Suburbano	Ferrocarriles Suburbanos	1	7	27	218,000
Mexico	Mexico City-Toluca	El Insurgente	El Insurgente	1	7	57.7	
United States	Albuquerque	New Mexico Rail Runner Express	Rio Metro	1	11	156	3,900
United States	Austin	CapMetro Rail	CapMetro – CapMetro Rail	1	9	51	1,600
United States	Boston	MBTA Commuter Rail	MBTA – Commuter Rail Maps and Schedules	12	141	641	129,400
United States	Chicago	Metra	Metra	11	243	785	296,600
United States	Chicago	South Shore Line	South Shore Line	1	19	140	11,500
United States	Dallas–Fort Worth	Trinity Railway Express (TRE)	Trinity Railway Express	1	10	54.7	8,300
United States	Dallas–Fort Worth	A-train	Denton County Transportation Authority	1	6	33.8	1,500
United States	Dallas–Fort Worth	TEXRail	Trinity Metro	1	9	43.8	1,301
United States	Dallas–Fort Worth	DART rail, Silver Line	DART	1	10	41.84	
United States	Denver	RTD Commuter Rail, A, B, G, and N lines	Fastracks	4	21	85.29	28,700
United States	Los Angeles	Metrolink	Metrolink	7	62	859	42,265
United States	Miami - West Palm Beach	Tri-Rail	Tri-Rail	1	18	114.1	13,700
United States	Nashville	WeGo Star	RTA – WeGo Star	1	6	51.5	1,000
United States	New Haven-Hartford	CTrail	CTrail	2	22	194.5	3,431
United States	New York metropolitan area	Long Island Rail Road	MTA – Long Island Rail Road	11	124	1100	385,000
United States	New York metropolitan area	Metro-North Railroad	MTA – Metro-North Railroad	6	124	1267	300,000
United States	New York metropolitan area	NJ Transit	NJ Transit	11	160	1530	301,746
United States	Orlando	SunRail	SunRail	1	16	78.7	4,300
United States	Philadelphia	SEPTA Regional Rail^{1}	SEPTA Regional Rail	13	153	450	125,300
United States	Portland	Westside Express Service (WES)	TriMet WES	1	5	23.7	1,400
United States	Salt Lake City	FrontRunner	UTA FrontRunner	1	16	142	13,000
United States	San Diego	Coaster	Coaster	1	8	66	4,800
United States	San Francisco Bay Area	Caltrain	Caltrain	1	32	124.6	58,250
United States	San Francisco Bay Area	Altamont Corridor Express (ACE)	ACE	1	10	138	2,800
United States	San Francisco Bay Area	Sonoma–Marin Area Rail Transit (SMART)	SMART	1	12	45	2,206
United States	Seattle	Sounder commuter rail	Sound Transit	2	9	132	17,057
United States	Washington	MARC	Maryland Transit Administration	3	43	301	31,300
United States	Washington	Virginia Railway Express	VRE	2	18	145	19,000

== Oceania ==
Country	City or area	Name	External link	Lines	Stations	Length (km)	Daily ridership
Australia	Adelaide	Railways in Adelaide	Adelaide Metro	6	89	132	39,700 (2018)
Australia	South East Queensland	Railways in South East Queensland	Queensland Rail	12	153	689	148,000 (2019)
Australia	Melbourne	Metro Trains Melbourne^{1}	Metro Trains Melbourne Public Transport Victoria Vicsig	17	221	1047	630,000 (2019)
Australia	Perth	Transperth	Transperth	7	74	253	159,600 (2018)
Australia	Sydney	Sydney Trains^{1}	Sydney Trains	9	170	813	709,000 (2023)
New Zealand	Auckland	AT Metro	Auckland Transport	4	40	129.10	300,000
New Zealand	Auckland-Hamilton	Te Huia	Te Huia	1	6	138.37	
New Zealand	Wellington	Metlink	Metlink	5	48	154	30,000
New Zealand	Wellington	Capital Connection	Capital Connection	1	5	136	

== South America ==
Country	City or area	Name	External link	Lines	Stations	Length (km)	Daily ridership
Argentina	Buenos Aires	Buenos Aires Metropolitan Area Rail Network	Trenes Argentinos Operaciones Satélite Ferroviario	8	224	815	1,400,000 (2015)
Argentina	Córdoba	Tren de las Sierras	Trenes Argentinos Operaciones Satélite Ferroviario	1	17	150.8	1,388 (2020)
Argentina	La Plata	University train of La Plata	Trenes Argentinos Operaciones	1	7	4.6	7,559 (2019)
Argentina	Neuquén-Cipolletti	Tren del Valle	Trenes Argentinos Operaciones	1	5	21	400 (2021)
Argentina	Salta	Servicio Regional Salta	Trenes Argentinos Operaciones Satélite Ferroviario	1	8	87	570 (2019)
Argentina	Santiago del Estero	Tren al Desarrollo	Government of Santiago del Estero	1	4	8	
Argentina / Paraguay	Posadas - Encarnación	Posadas-Encarnación International Train	Trenes Argentinos Operaciones	1	2	8	8,000 (2015)
Brazil	Crato–Juazeiro do Norte	Cariri Metro	Metrô do Cariri		9		5,000
Brazil	Fortaleza	Fortaleza Metro (Metrofor) (Note: Fortaleza is in the process of converting its suburban rail network into a full metro system.)	Metrofor	2	28	43	31,000
Brazil	João Pessoa	Sistema de Trens Urbanos de João Pessoa	CBTU João Pessoa	1	12	30	10,000
Brazil	Maceió	Maceió Urban Rail	CBTU Maceio	1	15	34.3	11,000
Brazil	Natal	Sistema de Trens Urbanos de Natal	CBTU Natal	2	23	56	15,000
Brazil	Rio de Janeiro	SuperVia	SuperVia	8	104	270	341,630
Brazil	São Paulo	São Paulo Metropolitan Trains^{1}	CPTM; ViaMobilidade; TIC Trens	7	97	277.4	2,500,000
Brazil	Sobral	VLT de Sobral (Metrofor) (Note: Metrô de Sobral is classified as light rail and use the Commuter rail tram-train as metro system.)	Metrofor	2	12	13.9	18,000
Brazil	Teresina	Teresina Metro		1	9	13.5	8,000
Chile	Valparaiso	Valparaíso Metro^{1}	Metro de Valparaíso	1	20	43	75,000
Chile	Concepción	Biotren		2	17	48	24,500
Chile	Concepción	Corto Laja		1	22	87.3	1,600
Chile	Santiago - Rancagua	Metrotren^{1}		1	18	133.8	74,000
Chile	Victoria	Regional Victoria-Temuco		1	8	65	1,300
Chile	Talca	Talca-Constitución Buscarril	Buscarril	1	11	88	136
Uruguay	Montevideo	State Railways Administration of Uruguay		1	5	80	1200
Venezuela	Caracas	Sistema Ferroviario Central		1	4	41.4	140,000

== See also ==
- Lists of urban rail transit systems
  - List of metro systems
  - List of tram and light rail transit systems
  - List of town tramway systems
  - List of monorail systems
- List of rail transit systems in the United States
- Regional rail
- S-Bahn
- List of airport people mover systems
- List of funicular railways
- List of trolleybus systems
- List of bus rapid transit systems
- List of premetro systems

== Notes ==
- ^1 Sydney, Melbourne, Barcelona, Berlin, Copenhagen, Frankfurt, Glasgow, Hamburg, Helsinki, Leipzig, Liverpool, London, Madrid, Milan, Munich, Naples, Paris (RER), Rome, Stockholm, Stuttgart, Tricity, Philadelphia, Santiago, São Paulo (CPTM) and Valparaíso have hybrid systems, with trains running as metro-like services (on segregated track—usually in tunnel—and with high frequency) in their inner cities, but as main-line commuter services in the suburbs. Nonetheless, the International Association of Public Transport (French: L’Union internationale des transports publics (UITP) does not consider these systems to be "metro" systems.
