= Fortaleza Metro =

Urban rail transit system in Fortaleza, Brazil

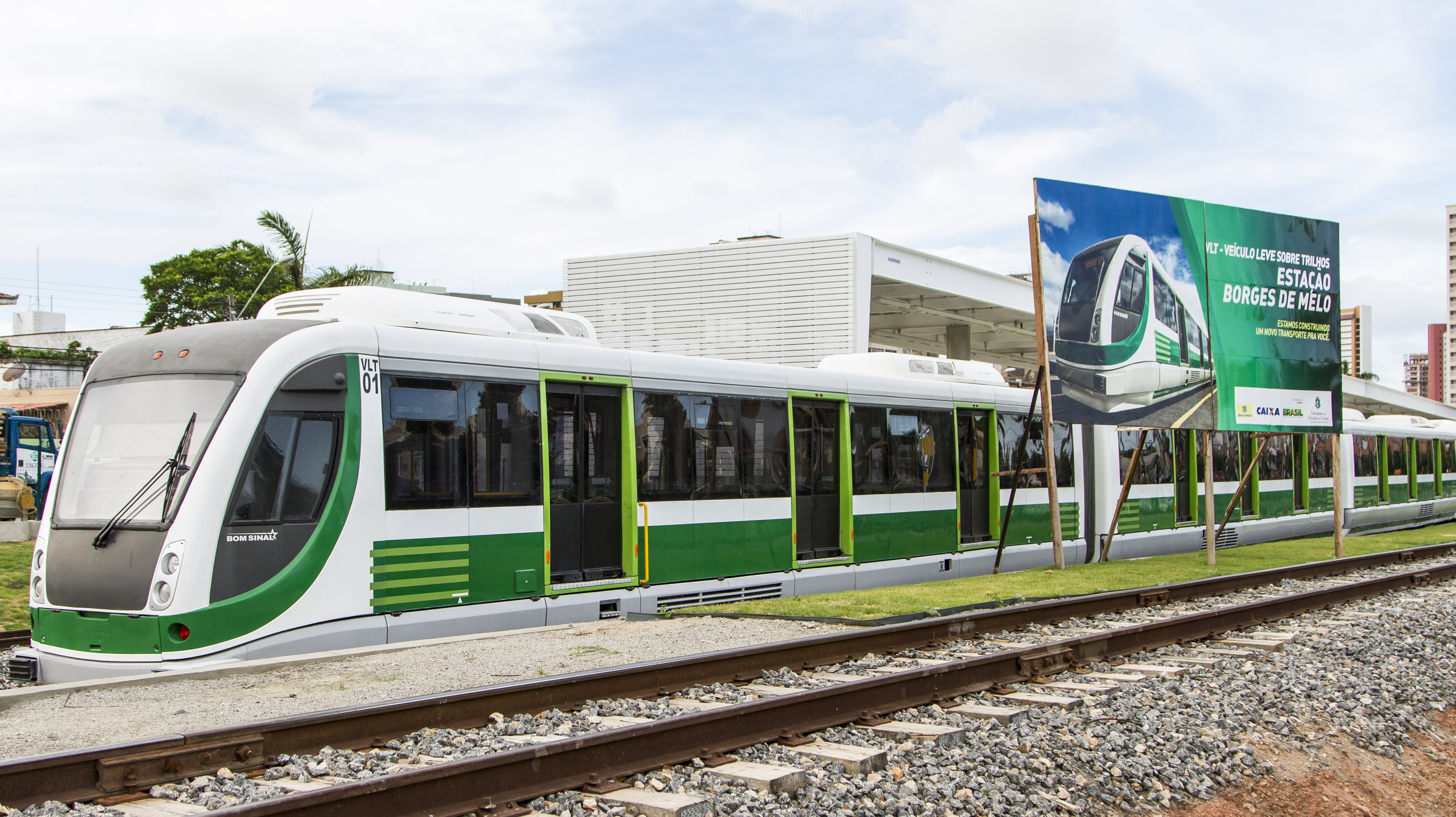

Overview
- Native name: Metrô de Fortaleza
- Locale: Fortaleza, Ceará, Brazil
- Transit type: Commuter rail; Light rail
- Number of lines: 3 (light rail); 1 (metro)
- Annual ridership: 15 million (2022)
- Website: Metrô de Fortaleza

Operation
- Began operation: 24 October 2012; 14 years ago
- Operator: Metrofor

Technical
- System length: 43.6 km (27.1 mi); 13.2 km (8.2 mi) (light rail)
- Track gauge: 1,000 mm (3 ft 3 3/8 in) metre gauge
System map
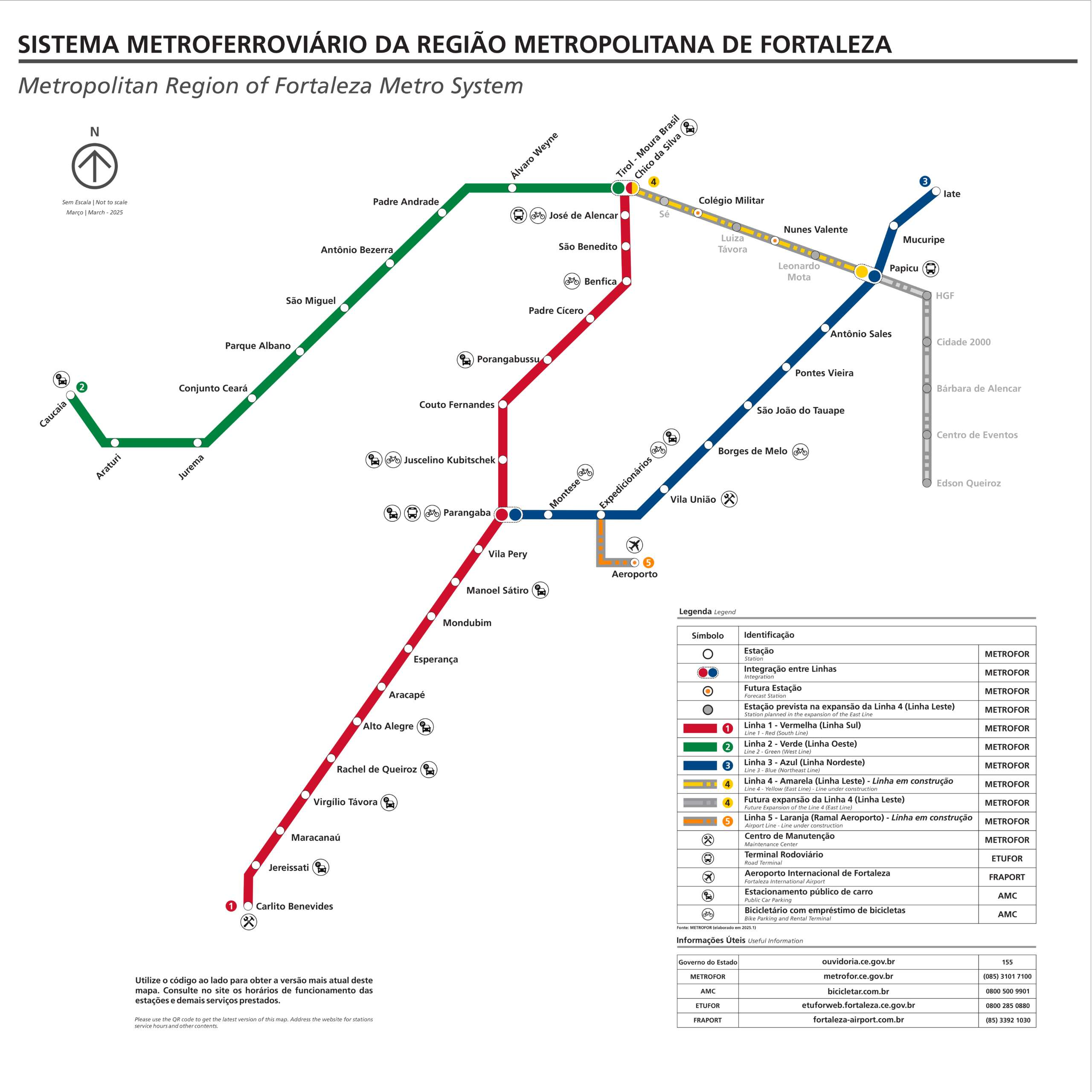
Map of metro and light rail (LRV) lines, operated by Metrofor, in operation and under construction in the Fortaleza Metropolitan Region.

The Fortaleza Metro, also known popularly as the Metropolitan of Fortaleza or Metrofor, is a system of metropolitan transport that operates in the Brazilian city of Fortaleza, operated by Companhia Cearense de Transportes Metropolitanos, company of social capital, captained by the Government of the State of Ceará, in Brazil. Founded on May 2, 1997, the company is responsible for administration, construction and metro planning in the state of Ceará, Metrofor manages seven public transport lines, four of which belong to the system in the capital of Ceará, in the three main metropolitan regions of Ceará: Fortaleza, Cariri, and Sobral.

With 62 stations distributed across 84.3 kilometers of railway lines, the Ceará network is the largest metro infrastructure operated by a company in the Northeast, serving more than 56,000 passengers daily in municipalities such as Fortaleza, Caucaia, Maracanaú, Pacatuba, Sobral, Juazeiro do Norte, and Crato.

Operations of the Fortaleza Metro began on June 15, 2012, with the inauguration of part of the South Line (1–Red). Currently, the system consists of one metro line, South Line (1–Red) (Central–Chico da Silva ↔ Carlito Benevides), and three diesel Light Rail Vehicle (LRV) lines: West Line (2–Green) (Moura Brasil ↔ Caucaia), Northeast Line (3–Blue) (Parangaba ↔ Iate) and Airport-Castelão Line (5–Orange) (Expedicionários ↔ Aeroporto). Between January and December 2025, the three lines in operation at the time transported approximately 15.2 million passengers, with a daily average of 52,800 users on weekdays.

In November 2023, the system was the fifth largest in Brazil in terms of length, with 56.8 kilometers of railway tracks and 40 stations, representing approximately 5.1% of the country's total urban rail transport network, which totaled 1,133.4 kilometers, according to data from the National Association of Rail Passenger Transport Operators (ANPTrilhos). In 2026, the system reached 59.3 kilometers and 41 stations with the inauguration of the first section of Line 5–Orange (Expedicionários ↔ Aeroporto). The network is expected to expand until 2028, when it should reach 71.7 kilometers in length with the inauguration of the first 7.3-kilometer section of Line 4–Yellow (Central–Chico da Silva ↔ Papicu) and the 5.1 kilometers of the second section of Line 5–Orange (Aeroporto ↔ Castelão).

== Background ==
The operator of the Fortaleza Metro, Metrofor, has been in the process of modernizing Fortaleza's rail network since 1999, with the first plans for improving the network going back to the 1980s. The project involved double tracking and electrification of two of the main passenger rail lines, installation of modern signalling and communications system, construction of new stations, and acquisition of new rolling stock, all with the goal of achieving higher frequency operations on the two lines. The upgraded rail network is expected to serve nearly 700,000 passengers a day.

== Operations ==
The existing Fortaleza rail infrastructure consists of 43 kilometers (27 mi) of rail route, comprising two lines:

=== Lines ===
Line	Termini	Opened	Length	Stations	Travel time (min)	Operation
1–Red (South / Sul)	Central – Chico da Silva ↔ Carlito Benevides	June 15, 2012	24.1 km (15.0 mi)	20	33	Opened, and in higher frequency operation.
2–Green (West / Oeste)	Caucaia ↔ Central – Chico da Silva	No information	19.5 km (12.1 mi)	10	30	Currently operational, but as a commuter rail line with lower frequencies.
3–Blue (Northeast / Nordeste)	Parangaba ↔ Iate	July 25, 2017	13.3km (8.26 mi)	11		Currently operational, but as a commuter rail line with lower frequencies.
5–Orange (Ramal Aeroporto / Airport Branch)	Expedicionários ↔ Aeroporto	February 6, 2026	2.4 km (1.5 mi)	2		

=== Routes ===
The 24.1-kilometer (15.0 mi) long South Line provides passenger services between Carlito Benevides in Maracanaú to Central – Chico da Silva in downtown Fortaleza. The Linha Sul (South Line) is the first of the two lines to be converted to higher frequency service, with headways of 27 minutes. Its route has been diverted into a 4.0-kilometer (2.5 mi) long tunnel, with 4 underground stations, all with 110 m (360 ft) long platforms, in the city center.

The West Line, currently operating as a commuter rail line, is 19.5 kilometers (12.1 mi) long. It begins at Caucaia and currently terminates at João Felipe, with plans to extend it to Central – Chico da Silva. It currently operates with train frequencies of 45 minutes.

=== Stations ===
Stations on the metro-standards South Line, from south to north:

- Carlito Benevides (formerly Vila das Flores)
- Jereissati
- Maracanaú
- Virgílio Távora (formerly Novo Maracanaú)
- Rachel de Queiroz (formerly Pajuçara)
- Alto Alegre
- Aracapé
- Esperança (formerly Conjunto Esperança)
- Mondubim
- Manoel Sátiro
- Vila Pery
- Parangaba
- Juscelino Kubitschek
- Couto Fernandes
- Padre Cícero
- Porangabussu
- Benfica
- São Benedito
- José de Alencar (formerly Lagoinha)
- Estação Central – Chico da Silva (formerly João Felipe)

=== Rolling stock ===
The AnsaldoBreda rolling stock used on the system is similar to that used on the Circumvesuviana railway, in Naples, Italy. A total of 20 train-sets were expected to be delivered, and in service, by 2012.

=== Light rail ===
A third rail line in the Fortaleza area, which runs between Parangaba and Mucuripe and which had operated as a cargo line, was converted into a diesel light rail line. The line partly opened in July 2017, was extended in July 2018, and was then extended to its current 10-station length with the opening of Iate station in September 2020. A 2.4 km (1.5 mi) long branch of the line (designated as line 5), running from Expedicionários station to Fortaleza–Pinto Martins International Airport, opened on February 9, 2026.

Line	Termini	Opened	Length	Stations	Operation
Parangaba Mucuripe	Parangaba ↔ Iate	2017	13.2 km (8.2 mi)	10	In operation

== Future plans: East Line ==
A new totally underground line, the East (Leste) line, was expected to begin construction in 2018, with the contract for its constructions awarded to Sacyr and Ferrera Guedes, with an estimated construction time of 48 months. Tunnel boring machines for the construction were announced to be provided by The Robbins Company in 2012, but construction stalled. Current plans are to complete this third metro line as follows:

Line	Termini	Planned opening	Length	Stations	Operation
East (Leste)	Central – Chico da Silva ↔ Fórum Clóvis Beviláqua	TBD	12 km (7 mi)	13	Under construction

== See also ==
- List of suburban and commuter rail systems
- Rapid transit in Brazil
