= Dikoko =

Brazilian food industry company

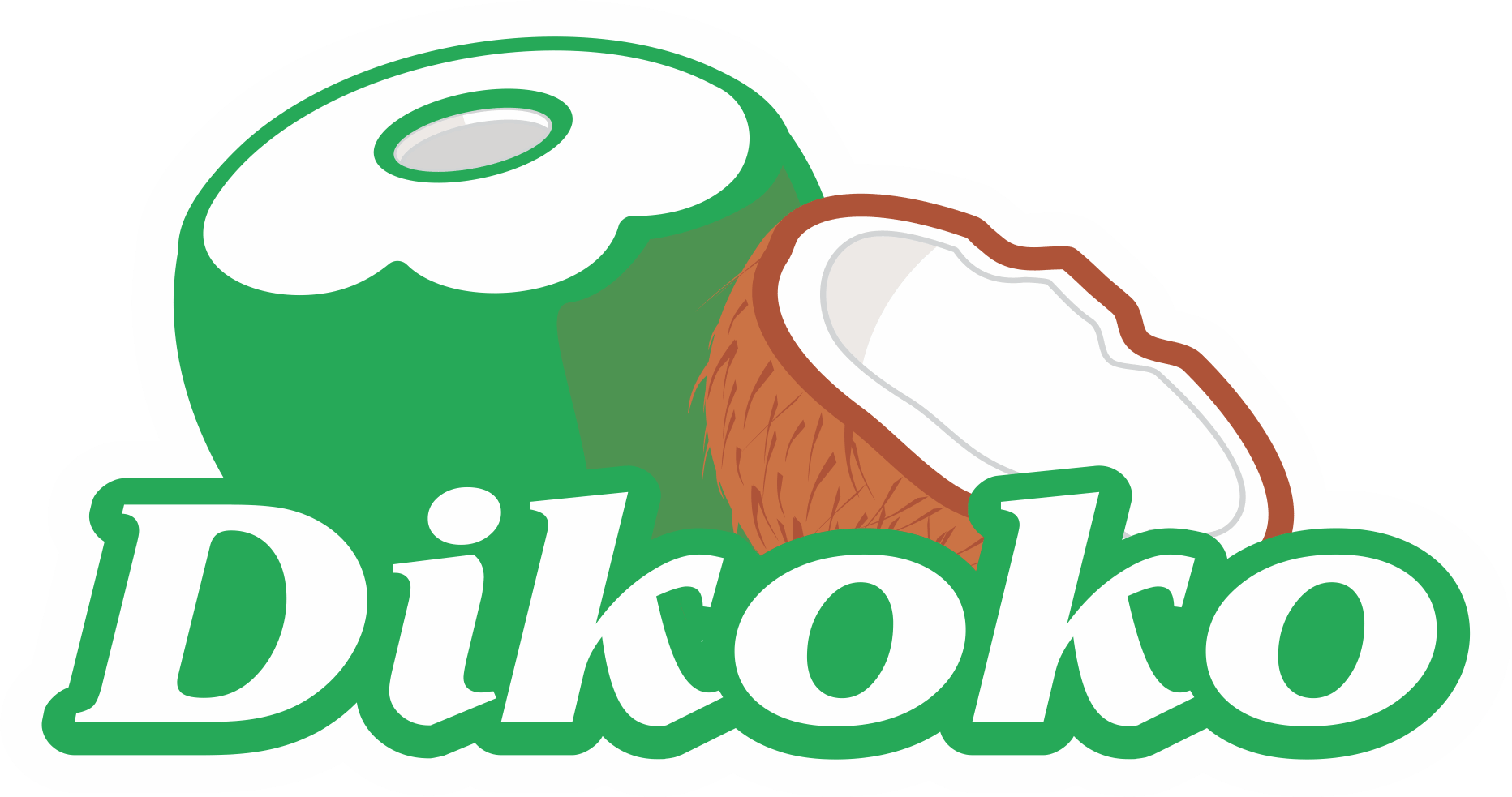
Currently, Dikoko is the largest coconut processing plant in Ceará, the second-largest coconut-derivatives industry in the Americas

Dikoko Alimentos Ltda., or simply Dikoko, is a Brazilian food industry company specializing in the processing and industrialization of coconut derivatives. Founded in 1987 by entrepreneur Raimundo Dias de Almeida, the company is headquartered in the district of Calumbi, located approximately 10 km from the municipal seat of Paraipaba, in the state of Ceará, and also operates a production unit in the municipality of Petrolândia, in the state of Pernambuco. Currently, Dikoko is the largest coconut processing plant in Ceará, the second-largest coconut-derivatives industry in the Americas, and the largest exporter of the fruit in the state.

The company operates throughout the entire production chain, from coconut cultivation to the processing and distribution of more than thirty derivative products, including coconut water, oil, milk, sugar, grated coconut, and flour. Its products are marketed both domestically and internationally, with exports to countries such as the United States, China, Mexico, Colombia, and Singapore.

In recent years, Dikoko has expanded its industrial structure in the state of Ceará, with emphasis on the plant located in Calumbi. The company is also investing in the construction of a new factory in Itapipoca, with a projected capacity to process up to 500,000 coconuts per day. The estimated investment for this expansion is approximately R$ 194 million over five years.

Dikoko generates direct and indirect employment in the region, contributing to the local economy, and adopts practices related to irrigated cultivation and the vertical integration of production.
