= Francisco Helder Braga Fernandes =

Brazilian bar owner (born 1959 or 1960)

- Born: 1959 or 1960 (age 65–66); Jucás, Ceará
- Occupation: Bar owner
- Known for: Bar do Bin Laden
- Website: Archived 30 September 2016 at the Wayback Machine

Francisco Helder Braga Fernandes (born 1959 or 1960), nicknamed the "Brazilian Bin Laden", is a Brazilian bar owner known for being a lookalike of former Al-Qaeda leader Osama bin Laden. He is the owner of a bar in São Paulo, where he lives, called Bar do Bin Laden.

== Biography ==
Francisco Helder Braga Fernandes was born in Jucás in 1959 or 1960 and moved to São Paulo in 1978. He originally named his bar, located in the Anhangabaú neighborhood, Barbas 'beards', after his thick beard. Soon after the September 11 attacks, a group of motorcyclists requested a photo with Fernandes due to a resemblance with Osama bin Laden. On another occasion, the police took action against him for the same reason. Until the attacks, Fernandes did not know who Bin Laden even was. Since the 1990s, he had been growing his large beard, but he did not properly let it grow long until 2000. Initially, Fernandes wanted to distance his image from bin Laden by shaving his beard three times, first in January 2002, due to harassment on the street after the attacks; again between 2003 and 2004, at the request of his girlfriend, though he grew the beard back after breaking up with her six months later; and in 2009, after a request by TV Al Jazeera crew members, who had reported on him. Fernandes, due to the publicity of his appearance, changed the name of his bar to Bar do Bin Laden afterwards and is now nicknamed the Brazilian Bin Laden. In contrast to Bin Laden, Fernandes describes himself as peaceful.

== Media representation ==
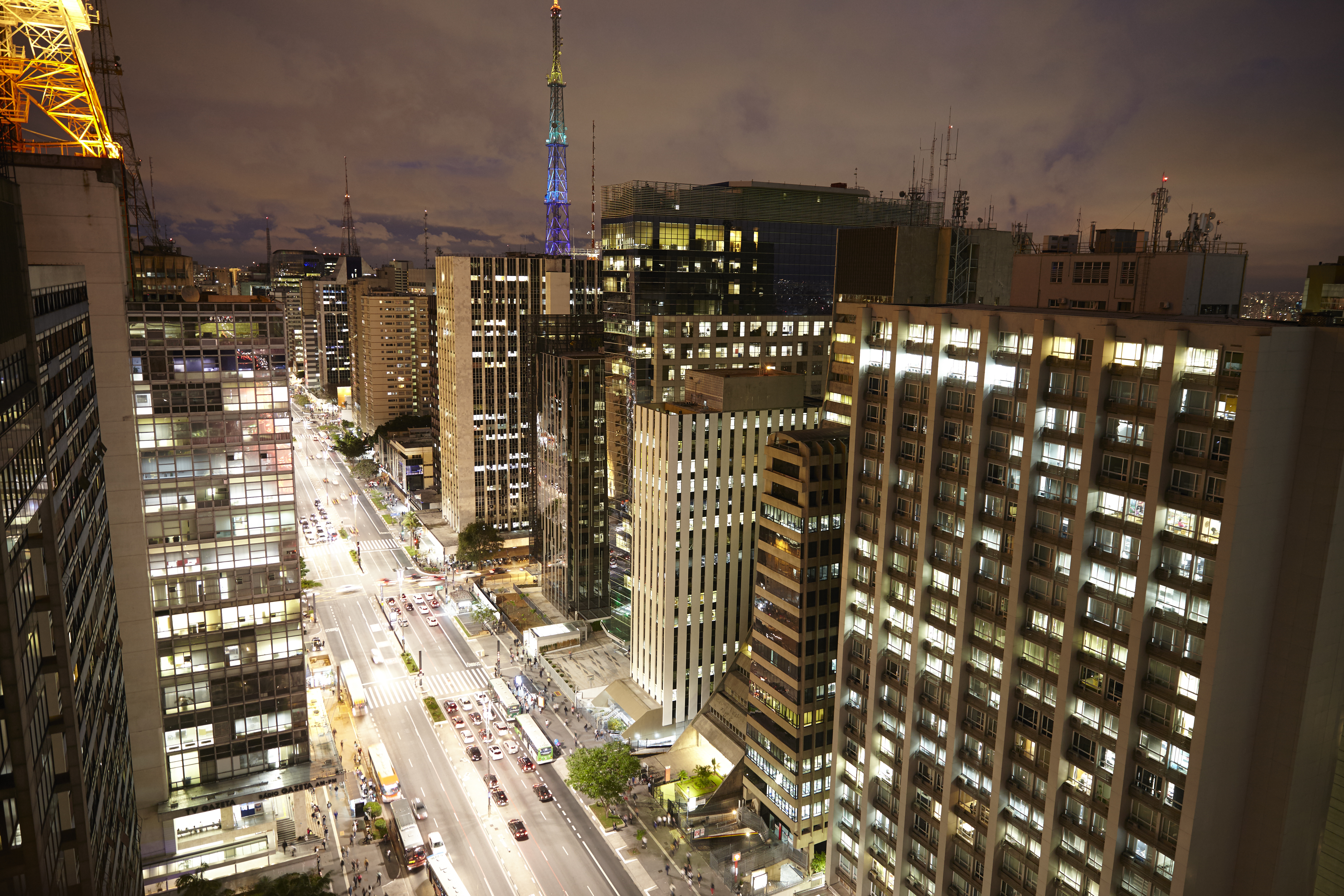
Paulista Avenue at night in 2014

Fernandes partook in the 2009 New Year's Eve celebration on Paulista Avenue, where he was taken on stage, resulting in national fame. According to him, "Never have I been photographed so much in my life." Fernandes has been the subject of reporting from Folha de S.Paulo and O Globo in Brazil, and from international news organizations, including The Guardian, HuffPost, Mega Brasil, The Telegraph, and the Daily Mirror. In 2011, following the death of bin Laden, TV Record sponsored a meeting between Fernandes and Ananias Rodrigues da Silva, a Barack Obama lookalike. He also made an appearance on Programa Silvio Santos, of the TV network SBT.

== See also ==
- MC Bin Laden
- Humor based on the September 11 attacks
