= Humor based on the September 11 attacks =

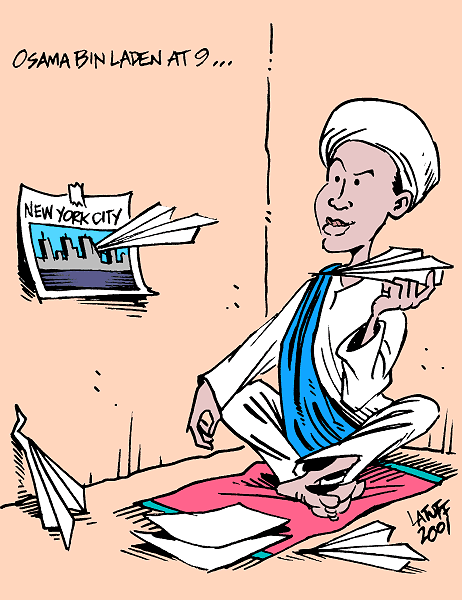
Caricature by Carlos Latuff of a 9-year-old Osama bin Laden throwing paper planes to a photo of New York City, where the 9/11 attacks occurred

The September 11 attacks (also known as 9/11) were a series of terrorist attacks by the Islamic terrorist group Al-Qaeda against the United States on the morning of Tuesday, September 11, 2001, in which 2,977 people and 19 hijackers were killed. Jokes based on the events have been made in print and other media since soon after the attacks.

A number of scholars have studied the ways in which humor has been used to deal with the trauma of the event, including researcher Bill Ellis who found that jokes about the attacks began the day afterwards in the U.S., and Giselinde Kuipers, who found jokes on Dutch websites a day later. Kuipers had collected around 850 online jokes about 9/11, Osama bin Laden, and the Afghanistan war by 2005. A notable early public attempt at 9/11 humor was by Gilbert Gottfried just a few weeks after the attacks. During a comedy roast for Hugh Hefner at the Friars Club the crowd did not respond well to Gottfried's 9/11 gag, with one audience member yelling "Too soon!", a common response to jokes told in the immediate wake of such events.

In contrast to these early jokes about 9/11, late-night comedy shows and humorous publications did not appear for several weeks following the attacks. The Onion, a satirical newspaper, cancelled the issue that had been scheduled to be released on September 11, 2001, and then returned to print with a special edition on September 26, 2001, which was devoted to the attacks.

== In literature ==
The Zero (2006) by Jess Walter is a post-9/11 satirical novel that features a New York City cop who shoots himself in the head and forgets it minutes later; his brain damage accounts for gaps in the story.

In 2016, comedian Billy Domineau uploaded a spec script to the Internet that he had written for Seinfeld, which had aired its last episode in 1998, set in New York during the days after the attacks. He said later that it had started when he suggested "a 9/11 episode of Seinfeld" to a student as an example of "an exercise in bad taste" for a class. In his episode, the show's four main characters follow plotlines typical of them, all related to the attacks: Jerry Seinfeld becomes convinced that dust from the fallen towers is contaminating his food; Elaine Benes,initially relieved that she will not have to break up with a boyfriend who worked at the Twin Towers, finds herself engaged to him when he unexpectedly survives; George Costanza receives praise after he is mistaken for a hero who rescued people, and Cosmo Kramer attempts to recover the high-quality box cutter he loaned to Mohamed Atta. Popular minor characters, such as George's parents and Newman, also make appearances. "[It] is indeed in bad taste, but it perfectly captures the self-obsessed way these characters would handle such a crisis," wrote The Guardian.

== On stage ==
Gilbert Gottfried was one of the first stand-up comedians to reference the 9/11 attacks on stage. Eighteen days after the attacks at the New York Friars Club Roast of Hugh Hefner hosted by Comedy Central, Gottfried said, "I have to catch a flight to California. I can't get a direct flight. They said they have to stop at the Empire State Building first." The joke was met with gasps, boos, and scattered laughter, with one person shouting that it was "too soon!". The joke was followed by the telling of a version of The Aristocrats joke, which was well received. In an interview with Vulture, Gottfried said, "I lost an audience bigger than anybody has ever lost an audience. People were booing and hissing." The Aristocrats joke, however, Gottfried stated, was "the biggest laughs I ever heard".

Just a month later, George Carlin addressed the attacks, sarcastically claiming that "otherwise the terrorists win", which he claimed to be the latest mindless mantra. He went on to joke about how in this extreme time he was even willing to cooperate with the US government and "Governor Bush". Then he elaborated his plan for retaliation through the use of "fart warfare".

One notable 9/11 joke was told by Joan Rivers in London in 2002. The joke concerned the widows of fire fighters killed in the attacks, who Rivers said would be disappointed if their husbands had been found alive as they would be forced to return money they had received in compensation for their late spouses. The joke received condemnation from Harold A. Schaitberger, General President of the International Association of Fire Fighters.

Pete Davidson has incorporated several 9/11 jokes into some of his routines. His father, Scott Davidson, was a New York City firefighter serving in Ladder 118 who died in service during the 9/11 attacks; he was last seen entering the Marriott World Trade Center. On September 12, 2021, Davidson and Jon Stewart hosted NYC Still Rising After 20 Years: A Comedy Celebration, a comedy special performed in Madison Square Garden, with proceeds going towards 9/11-related charities. Amy Schumer, Bill Burr, Colin Jost, Colin Quinn, Dave Attell, Dave Chappelle, Jay Pharoah, Jimmy Fallon, John Mulaney, Michael Che, Ronny Chieng, Tom Segura and Wanda Sykes also performed.

== On screen ==
To improve the chance of an Oscar award, a 9/11 joke was cut from Jean Dujardin's 2012 comedy film The Players. The deleted scene featured a man seducing a woman in a New York apartment while an aircraft crashes into the World Trade Center in the background.

In the 2009 movie Gulaal, the song "Ranaji" features references to the 9/11 attacks, with one line translating into "Like a plane forced itself into the tower of a faraway country". It also features other political references, like colonialism, Afghan Jihad, and the invasion of Iraq.

In The Simpsons episode "Moonshine River", aired in 2012, Bart tells Homer he would desire New York now that his two least favorite buildings have been obliterated, but then quickly adds Old Penn Station and Shea Stadium, after a pause.

=== South Park ===
In November 2001, South Park released an episode entitled "Osama bin Laden Has Farty Pants". The town is in shock following the events of September 11—for instance, children are sent to school in gas masks for fear of anthrax. Cartman, Stan, Kyle and Kenny are locked into a military plane by mistake and end up stranded in Afghanistan, where they are captured and held hostage by Osama bin Laden. The boys are ultimately rescued by four local children, and Cartman kills bin Laden in a fight resembling those in Looney Tunes cartoons during World War II. In October 2006, the episode "Mystery of the Urinal Deuce" aired, making fun of the conspiracy theories about the attacks. An outraged Mr. Mackey launches an investigation after an unknown person (later revealed to be Stan) defecates in a school urinal. Meanwhile, Cartman launches his own investigation into September 11, much to the frustration of Kyle, and ultimately comes to the conclusion that Kyle was behind the attack.

=== Family Guy ===
In the Family Guy episode "Back to the Pilot", broadcast in November 2011, Brian and Stewie take a trip back in time during which Brian tips off his past self about 9/11 so that the present-day him can play hero and stop the terrorist attacks. This causes George W. Bush to lose re-election, meaning a Second Civil War starts that leads to nuclear attacks on the Eastern Seaboard. Brian and Stewie are then forced to go back and mend the situation, later noting that their celebratory cheers of causing 9/11 to happen again would sound bad if taken out of context. A Time critic wrote of the episode, "It sounds custom-made for a 'too soon' label, and it probably is. But avid Family Guy viewers live for 'too soon' moments, no matter how sensitive the material." Other news organizations, including Aly Semigran of Entertainment Weekly, also thought the show had gone too far with the reference. Deadline also commented that it "squeaked past the Fox standards and practices department but is sure to raise as many eyebrows."

Meanwhile, the Season 16 episode "Boy (Dog) Meets Girl (Dog)" saw Stewie make an off-color about how the 9/11 planes didn't land, which he immediately acknowledged was in poor taste. Brian then stated that he was supposed to be on one of the planes, alluding to the fact that Seth MacFarlane, the voice of Brian and Stewie, was supposed to fly on American Airlines Flight 11, but had missed it because he was late in getting to the airport by 10 minutes.

Perhaps reflecting how the acceptability to mainstream broadcasters of jokes referencing the 9/11 attacks has evolved only gradually, however, the DVD release of the earlier season five Family Guy episode "Meet the Quagmires", first aired in 2007, contained an extended scene that was removed from the episode as it was first broadcast. In the deleted scene, while traveling in time back to 1980s Quahog with Peter, Brian is confronted by the boyfriend of a woman he has been hitting on. In response to the boyfriend's challenge that he will fight Brian 'anywhere, any time', Brian invites the man to meet him "On top of the World Trade Center, September 11th, 2001, at 8am", to which the boyfriend replies "I will be there, pal. You think I'll forget, but I won't!".

== In print ==
Satirical newspaper The Onion cancelled their Volume 7 Issue 32 of the paper, scheduled to be released on September 11. John Krewson, a writer for The Onion at the time, said "For one thing, distribution would have been a nightmare. Second of all, we just didn't think anyone was ready for a bunch of wacky jokes that were no longer relevant." The paper also skipped the following Issue 33 as the staff went on a week-long break to reflect on the tragedy. Initially, the writing staff had considered not referencing the attacks at all in the following issue, with writer Todd Hanson saying "Our normal, irreverent, edgy, cynical, dark humor wasn't going to be emotionally appropriate with this situation." Multiple employees threatened to quit if the paper ran an issue focused on the attacks, but no employee left once the paper was released. The paper went on to release Issue 34 of the paper on September 27, with most articles being in response to the attacks. The leading article was titled "U.S. Vows To Defeat Whoever It Is We're At War With", with other headlines such as "American Life Turns Into Bad Jerry Bruckheimer Movie" and "Not Knowing What To Do, Woman Bakes American-Flag Cake". The Onion's editor-in-chief Robert Siegel later said of the issue "Everything in that issue either needed to make a point or express something people were feeling." Jokes that directly poked fun at the loss of life were cut, such as "America Stronger Than Ever Says Quadragon Officials", with the writers preferring to make jokes about how the American people were feeling at the time. No writers were credited with writing their respective articles, with all articles being credited to The Onion. The issue was well received by both critics and the public.

== In advertising ==
In the days before the 15th anniversary of the attacks in 2016, Miracle Mattress of San Antonio, Texas, briefly ran a commercial promoting a sale themed around the occasion. In it, the daughter of the store's owner, in conversation with two employees who stood behind her, explained how the store was recalling the Twin Towers' collapse by selling all its inventory at the price of twin-sized mattresses for the weekend with the slogan "Twin Towers, Twin Price". At the end of the ad, she inadvertently pushed the two employees into twin piles of mattresses behind her, one of which was topped with the American flag; both collapsed. After briefly expressing shock and horror, she turned to the camera and said "We'll never forget".

The company soon pulled the ad, but copies were saved and uploaded to the Internet, where it and Miracle became the subject of intense and vociferous criticism. Entertainment Weekly said it "might be most offensive commercial ever". The Miracle Mattress Yelp! and Facebook pages filled with disparaging comments and calls for boycotts. Owner Mike Bonnano, whose daughter had, as the chain's head of marketing, conceived the commercial and starred in it, apologized profusely but eventually decided to close the San Antonio location "indefinitely" pending disciplinary measures and donations to the 9/11-related charity Tuesday's Children. Miracle Mattress reopened a few days later.

In Brazil there are bars and restaurants named after Bin Laden, inspired by their owners looking like Osama. A prominent example is the Bar do Bin Laden, run by Bin Laden lookalike Francisco Helder Braga Fernandes.

== Online culture ==
Internet memes have become a common way of distributing jokes about 9/11, often lampooning 9/11 conspiracy theories with such phrases as "Bush did 9/11" or "jet fuel can't melt steel beams." Viral videos on Vine and other platforms feature fictional characters, celebrities or other notable people appearing to be responsible for the attacks, typically throwing an object or flying an aircraft, before cutting to footage of the planes hitting the Twin Towers (mostly Flight 175 hitting the South Tower). These videos are also sometimes accompanied by statements that said character or individual "did 9/11". Following the popularity of Barbenheimer in 2023, some Japanese Twitter users made memes showing the Twin Towers with pink smoke or Barbie interacting with Osama bin Laden; this was in response to the subject matter of Oppenheimer dealing with the creation of the atomic bomb, which is an extremely sensitive subject in Japan due to the fact that it is the only country to have been attacked with atomic bombs. Images featuring George W. Bush learning about the attacks while reading to children during his visit to an elementary school were used humorously in other contexts to show him learning about various pop culture events.

== See also ==
- "Mystery of the Urinal Deuce," a South Park episode related to 9/11 conspiracy theories.
- List of cultural references to the September 11 attacks
- List of entertainment affected by the September 11 attacks
- Cultural influence of 9/11
- Holocaust humor
