= Cariri Metro =

Commuter rail line in Ceará state, Brazil

Overview
- Native name: Metrô do Cariri; VLT do Cariri
- Locale: Crato–Juazeiro, Ceará, Brazil
- Transit type: Commuter rail (or light rail)
- Number of lines: 1
- Number of stations: 9
- Daily ridership: 1,700 (daily)
- Annual ridership: 557,894 (2025)
- Website: VLT do Cariri

Operation
- Began operation: 1 December 2009
- Operator: Metrofor
- Number of vehicles: Diesel light rail vehicles
- Headway: 40 minutes (weekdays)

Technical
- System length: 13.6 km (8.5 mi)
- Track gauge: 1,000 mm (3 ft 3 3/8 in) metre gauge

Cariri Metro (Portuguese: Metrô do Cariri, though it is technically not a metro system; also known as Portuguese: VLT do Cariri) is a 13.9-kilometer (8.6 mi), nine station diesel commuter rail line (sometimes referred to as a light rail (VLT) line) in the Cariri region of southern Ceará state, Brazil. It is operated by Companhia Cearense de Transportes Metropolitanos, which also operates the Fortaleza Metro. It is expected to transport about 5,000 passengers per day. The line went into operation on an experimental basis on 1 December 2009, and went into regular service in 2010.

This rail line connects the cities of Crato and Juazeiro do Norte together, and is operated with diesel light rail vehicles (LRVs). The initially estimated cost for implementation of this project was R$ 13,223,522; the cost that was later revised to R$ 25,190,720.

The commuter rail system was implemented on a 13.9-kilometer (8.6 mi) existing railway line, where the rail was adjusted to allow for the acquisition of greater speeds between stations. Five stations were built in Juazeiro do Norte, and four in Crato.

In the future, it is planned to extend this rail line to the city of Barbalha, south of Juazeiro do Norte.

== History ==
In late 2006, Lúcio Alcântara, the then-Governor of Ceará, announced the construction of a passenger rail line in Cariri, which was later renamed Metrô do Cariri. The inauguration was scheduled for February 2007, but in January 2007, work on the line was halted due to the change in state government, and was only resumed in June 2007.

The Metro Cariri was officially opened for test service on 1 December 2009 and, after further testing, for full commercial operation in 2010.

== Operations ==
=== Line ===
The Cariri Metro's single passenger rail line, called the Central Line, serves a total of nine stations, and runs over a total length of 13.6 kilometers (8.5 mi), consisting entirely of an at-grade rail route. The gauge of this line is meter gauge (1,000 mm (3 ft 3 3/8 in)). The frequency of trains on the line is every 40 minutes on weekdays. Every one hour and 20 minutes on Saturdays.

A second line for the system, to be called the South Line, is in the planning stages.

=== Rolling stock ===
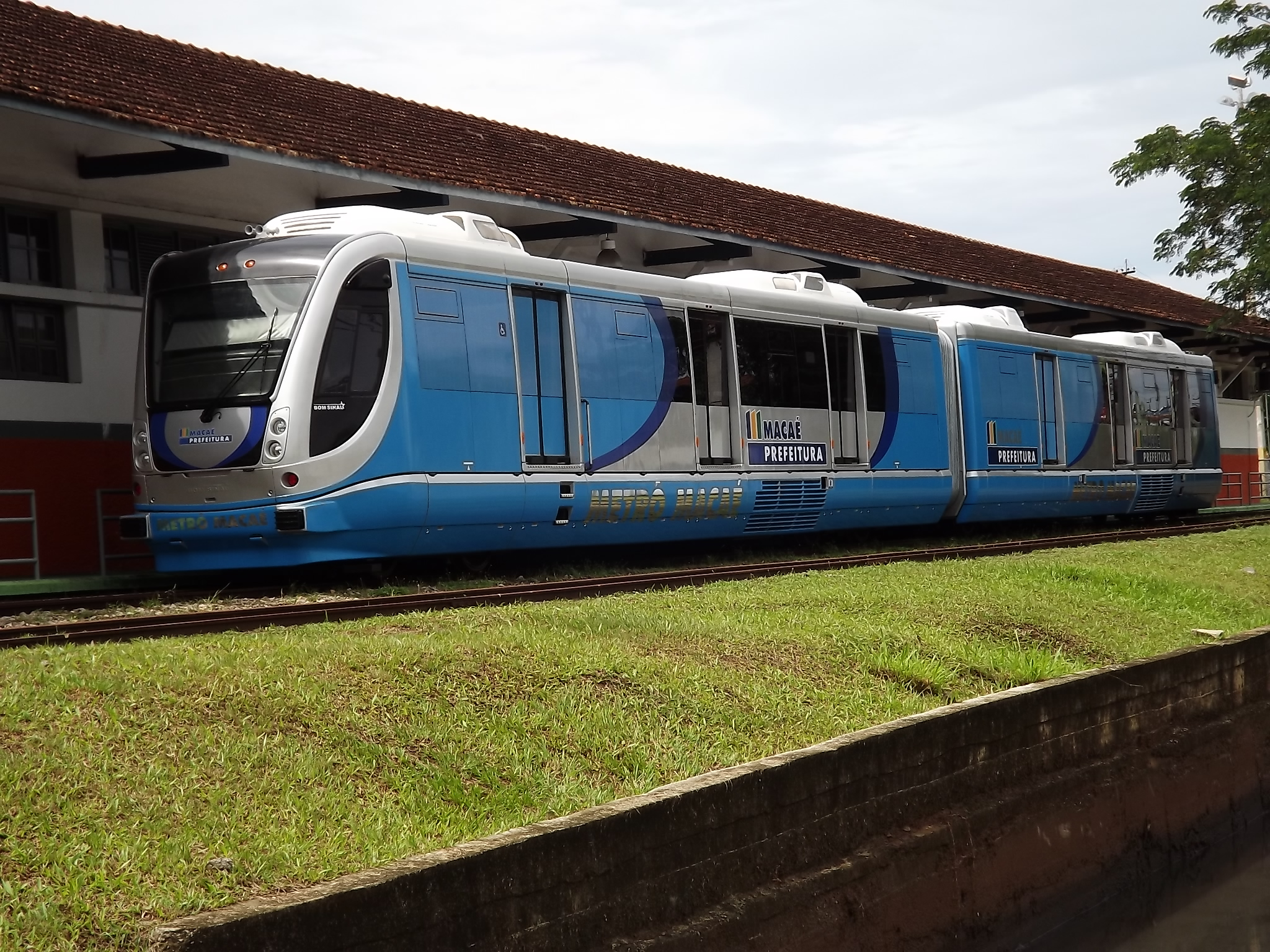
Example of the VLT Bom Sinal in Macaé, which is almost identical to the one in Cariri.

The fleet generally consists of a LRV trainset composition which is formed by two air-conditioned cars, and which are capable of carrying up to 330 passengers per train. While the vehicles used by the Cariri Metro have a maximum speed of 80 km/h (50 mph), they operate with a maximum speed of 60 km/h (37 mph) on the rail line itself. The LRVs operated on this line are diesel hydraulic powered.

The trainsets are built by Bom Sinal Indústria e Comércio Ltda., a company established in the municipality of Barbalha. LRVs are stored in a depot in Crato.

During festival season, the number of cars is doubled due to demand.

== Ridership ==
Year	Passengers
2016	365,059
2017	200,760
2018	409,777
2019	499,915
2020	163,985
2021	377,602
2022	515,088
2023	577,894

== See also ==
- Teresina Metro
