= Teresina Metro =

Commuter rail line in Teresina, Piauí, Brazil

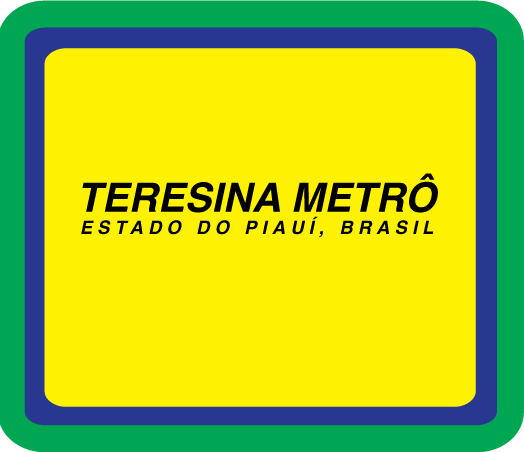

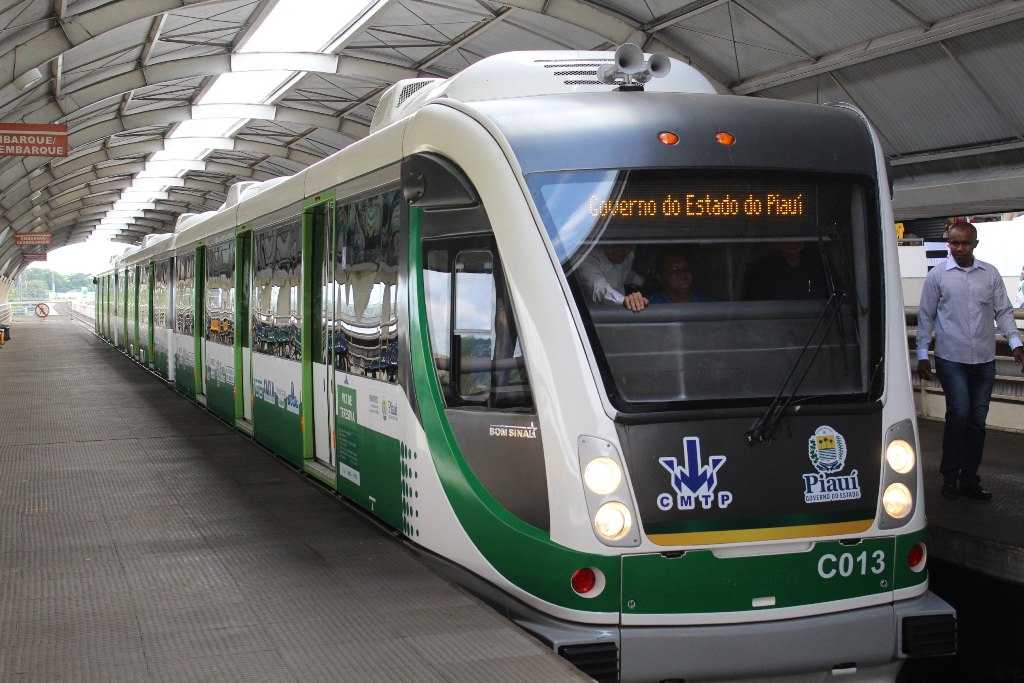

Overview
- Native name: Metrô de Teresina
- Locale: Teresina, Piauí, Brazil
- Transit type: Rapid Transit, Commuter rail
- Number of lines: 1
- Number of stations: 13
- Annual ridership: 1,700,000 (2025)

Operation
- Began operation: 11 January 1991; 35 years ago
- Operator: CFLP

Technical
- System length: 16.8 km (10.4 mi)
- Track gauge: 1,000 mm (3 ft 3 3/8 in) metre gauge

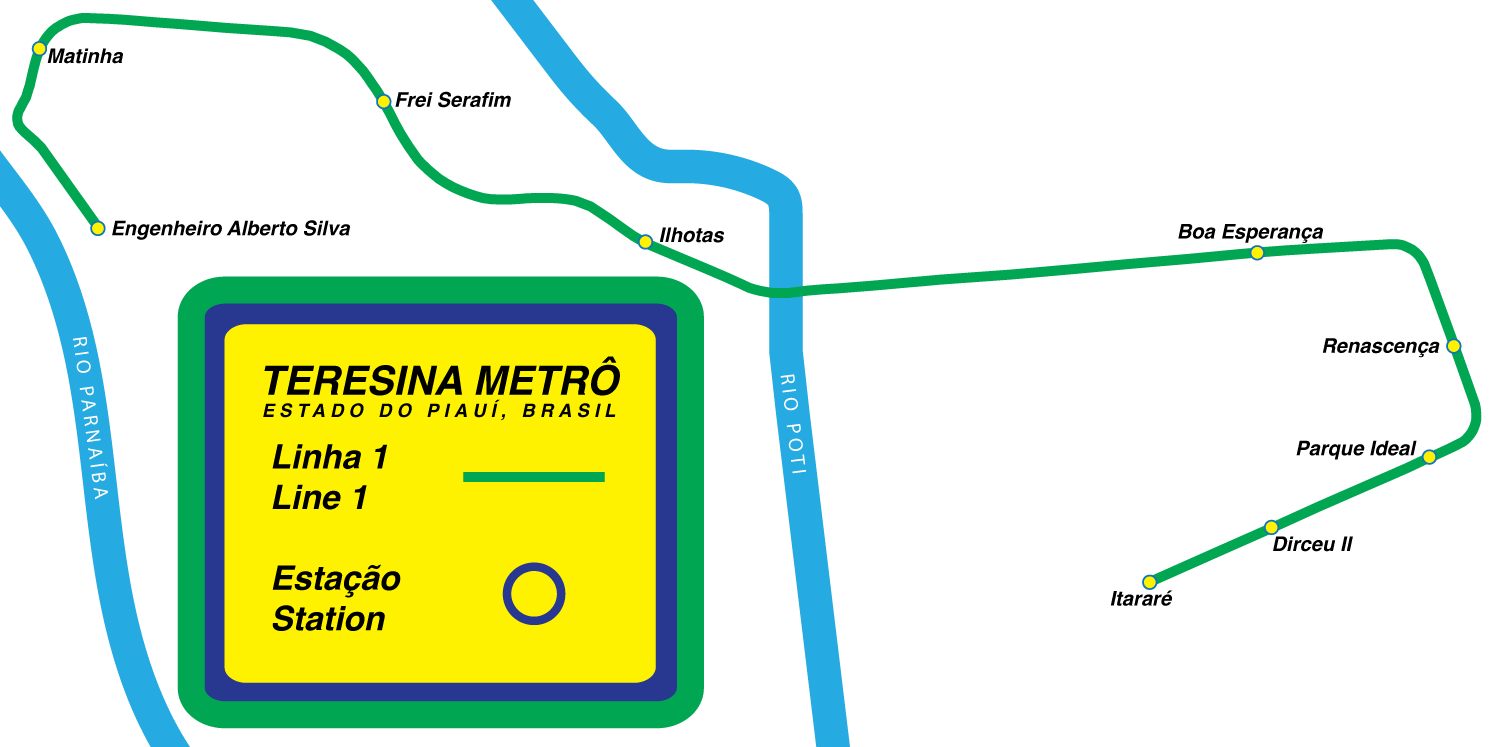
Teresina Metro (route map of 2014)

The Teresina Metro (Portuguese: Metrô de Teresina, commonly called Metrô) in Teresina, the capital and largest city of the Brazilian state of Piauí, is a diesel light rail line operated by Companhia Ferroviária e de Logística do Piauí (CFLP, Railroad and Logistics Company of Piauí). It is 16.8 kilometres (10.4 mi) long with 13 stations and serves a daily ridership of about 5,000 in 2025.

== History ==
First plans came up in 1978 and have been overhauled several times. To reduce the costs of the system, the project uses the existing metre gauge rail line, which travels through Teresina. It was placed into a cut in the centre of the city, to reduce interference with road traffic. It adopted diesel train-sets sponsored by RFFSA, which covered the stretch between Porto Alegre and Uruguaiana before, which has the metre gauge track. The construction works were initiated in July 1987. The company of the Teresina Metro was inaugurated on 15 August 1989, with the objective of establishing a high-capacity transport for the urban agglomeration of Teresina.

Line 1 entered into trial operation in November 1990 and was launched commercially on 11 January 1991.

A new station under construction in the city centre was supposed to increase usage to 20,000 passengers daily since none of the other stations are in the center of the city nor do they have bus terminals at their stations (the majority of Teresina Metro stations are on narrow streets in poorer neighborhoods with little commercial activity). After the inauguration of the Engenheiro Alberto Tavares Silva/Bandeira station, daily ridership only increased to 8,000 in 2013. In comparison, the city bus system handles about 225,000 daily passengers.

The Teresina Metro has plans to expand since it currently serves no major shopping center (besides the Shopping da Cidade which is populated by street vendors), the local soccer stadium, bus station or airport.

=== 2023 Modernization program ===
Since 2023, there is the commencement of the first phase of a major modernization and expansion program, budgeted at 531 million reais (approximately 90 million euros), which aims to achieve 15-minute service intervals. Individual measures, totaling 193 million reais and scheduled for completion by mid-2026, include:

- Upgrading the former railway line eastward from Boa Esperança station to Todos os Santos station, including the construction of a new junction station. This all was completed in May 2026.
- Installation of concrete sleepers and more robust rails.
- Construction of a new Mafuá station between Matinha and Frei Serafim stations.
- Double-tracking from Mafuá to Ilhotas, from Parque Ideal to Itararé, and around the São João station.
- Construction of a new double-track underpass beneath the six-lane Avenida Higino Cunha to eliminate the existing level crossing.
- Renovation of the Itararé (inaugurated 14. July 2025) and Renascença stations.
- Acquisition of three additional railcars.
- A new traffic control center at the Transnordestina depot.

In a second phase, two major projects will be implemented:

- Construction of a new bridge with double track approximately 260 meters long over the Río Poti and the parallel expressway.
- Double-tracking and reconstruction of the elevated section towards the city center, including the construction of a new terminus building at Eng. Alberto Tavares Silva station.

Furthermore, the remaining single-track sections from the elevated railway to Mafuá station and from the new river bridge to Boa Esperança station will be expanded by a second track, the remaining seven stations not yet renovated will be made accessible, and the maintenance depot will be modernized. Five additional train cars are also planned to enable the system to transport 40,000 passengers daily. A total of another 351 million reals are planned, the contract for this was signed on October 6, 2025.

== Operations ==
=== System characteristics ===
The system consists of a total length of 16.8 kilometres (10.4 mi). Eleven stations formed mostly by surface track, one lays inside a cutting and one is elevated. Diesel trains are running on a single-track line with meter gauge (1,000 mm (3 ft 3 3/8 in)), traveling at an average speed of 30 km/h (19 mph). Three new train sets have been coming into operations in 2018, three additional train sets will come into sercvice in 2026.

=== Line ===
Line	Terminals	Inauguration	Length	Stations	Length of trips (min)	Operation
1	Eng. Alberto Tavares Silva ↔ Itararé	11 January 1991	13.5 km	11	35	daily, 7:00-19:00 hrs
2	Boa Esperança ↔ Colorado	12 November 2024	2.3 km	1	5	daily, 7:00-19:00 hrs
2	Colorado ↔ Todos Santos	12 May 2026	1.0 km	1	3	daily, 7:00-19:00 hrs

== See also ==
- Cariri Metro
