= Catarina, Ceará =

Municipality in Ceará, Brazil

Coordinates: 6°07′51″S 39°52′40″W

Catarina
- Municipality
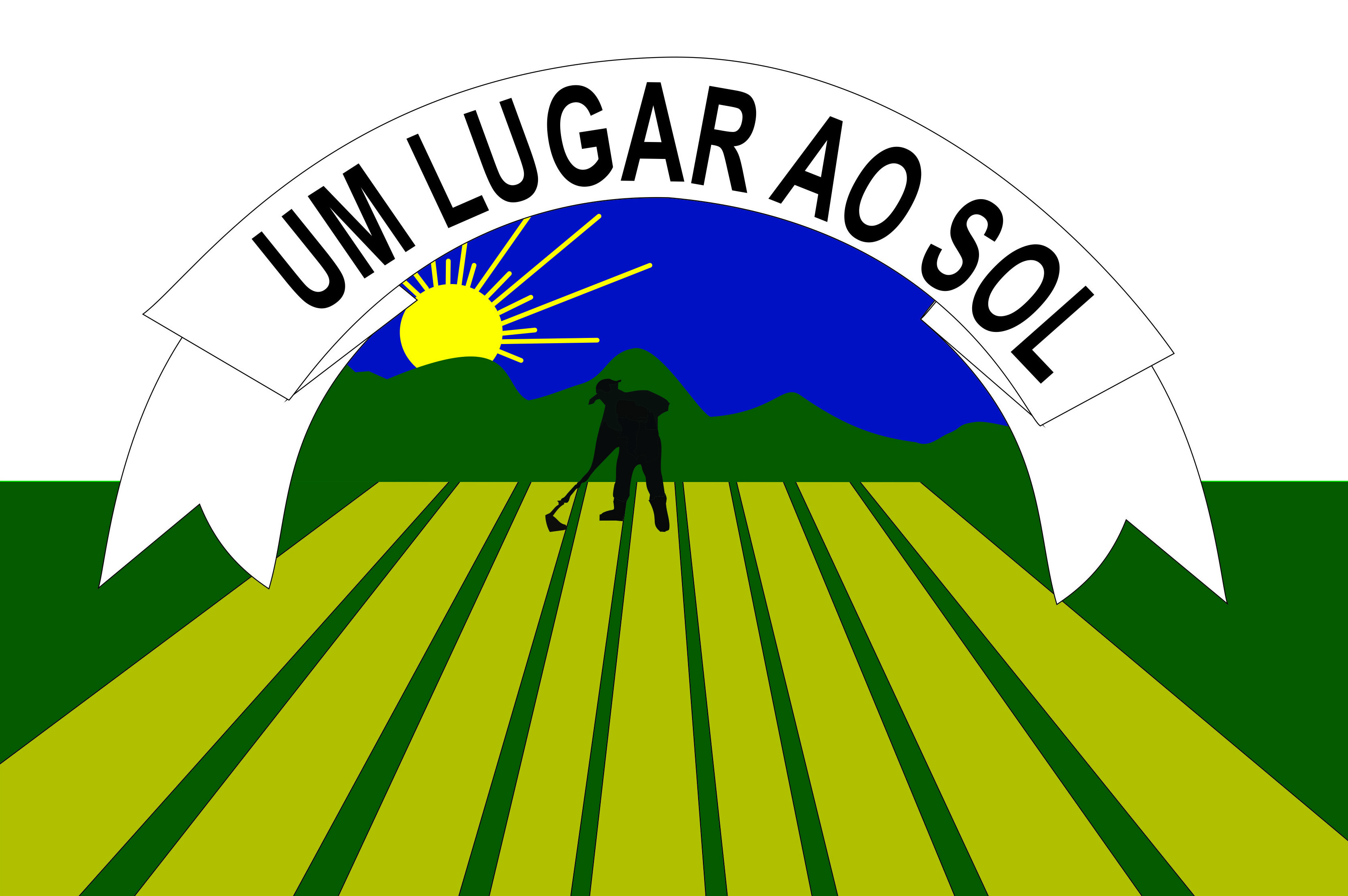
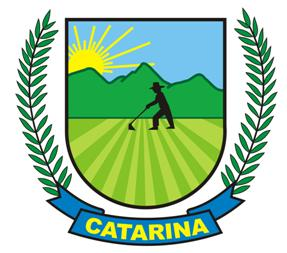
- Flag Coat of arms
- Interactive map of Catarina
- Country: Brazil
- Region: Nordeste
- State: Ceará
- Mesoregion: Sertoes Cearenses

Population (2020)
  - Total: 20,871
- Time zone: UTC−3 (BRT)

Catarina, Ceará is a municipality in the state of Ceará in the Northeast region of Brazil.

== See also ==
- List of municipalities in Ceará
