= Jucás =

Municipality in Ceará, Brazil

Coordinates: 6°31′30″S 39°31′40″W

- Municipality
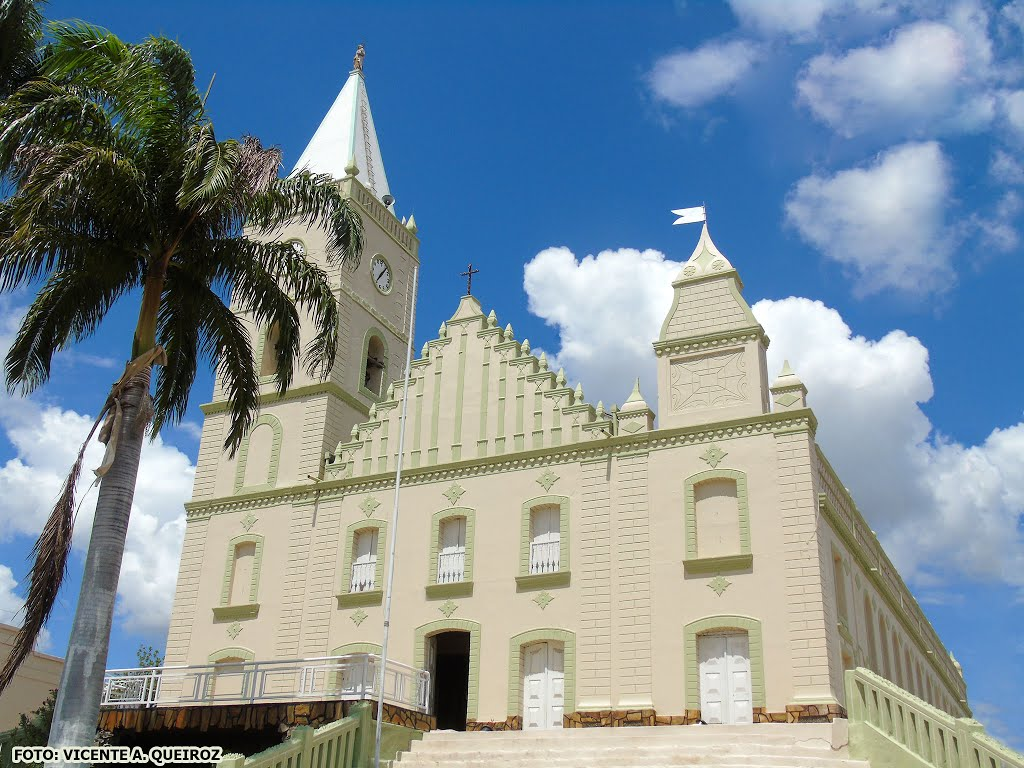

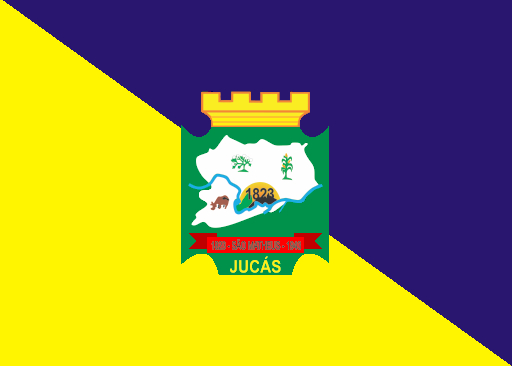
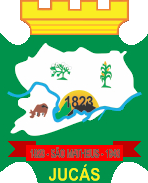
- Flag Coat of arms
- Interactive map of Jucás
- Country: Brazil
- Region: Nordeste
- State: Ceará
- Mesoregion: Centro-Sul Cearense

Population (2020)
  - Total: 24,892
- Time zone: UTC−3 (BRT)

Jucás is a municipality in the state of Ceará in the Northeast region of Brazil.

== See also ==
- List of municipalities in Ceará
