= Juazeiro do Norte =

Municipality in Ceará, Brazil

- city
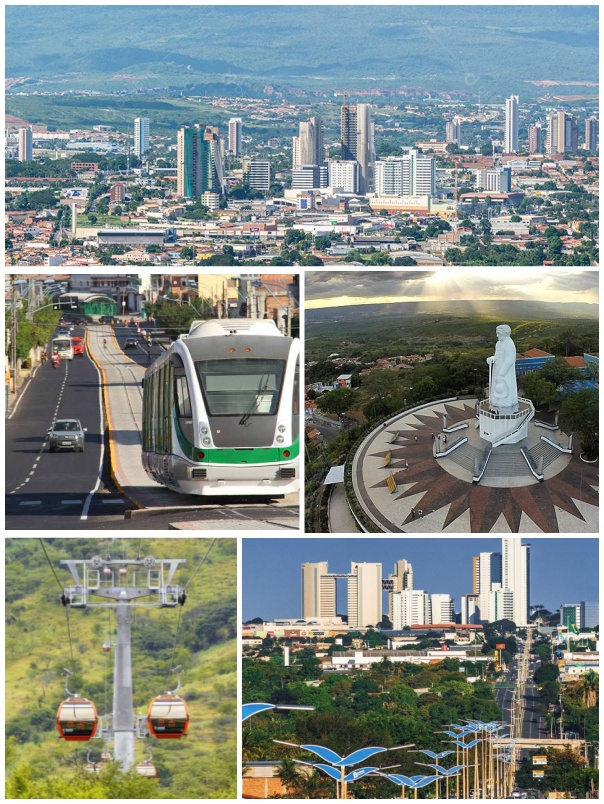

- Flag Coat of arms

- Location of Juazeiro do Norte
- Coordinates: 7°13′27″S 39°18′47″W
- Country: Brazil
- Region: Northeast
- State: Ceará
- Settled: July 30, 1858
- Founded: July 22, 1911 by Padre Cícero

Government
  - Mayor: Glêdson Lima Bezerra (PODE)

Area
  - Total: 348,200 km^{2} (134,400 sq mi)
- Elevation: 350 m (1,150 ft)

Population (2022)
  - Total: 286,120
  - Estimate (2025): 305,531
  - Density: 0.8217/km^{2} (2.128/sq mi)

Juazeiro do Norte is a city in the state of Ceará in northeastern Brazil. It is located 491 km south of the state capital Fortaleza in the semiarid sertão. The municipality has a population of 305.531 (2025 official estimate) and covers 248 km^{2}.

Juazeiro do Norte is best known as the base of the charismatic priest and politician Padre Cícero (Cícero Romão Batista) (1844–1934). A pilgrimage in his honour takes place every November, attracting thousands of followers.

The city is served by Orlando Bezerra de Menezes Airport. Juazeiro do Norte is connected to the nearby city of Crato by a commuter rail line called the Cariri Metro that opened in 2009–2010.

== History ==
Juazeiro do Norte was initially a district of the nearby city of Crato, until a young Padre Cícero Romão Batista decided to stay as a cleric in the village. Padre Cícero was then responsible for the independence and emancipation of the city. Because of the so-called "Milagre de Juazeiro" ("Miracle in Juazeiro", when Padre Cícero gave the sacred host to the religious sister Maria de Araújo, the host became blood), the priest was associated with mystical characteristics and began to be venerated by the people as a saint. Today the city is the second largest in the state and a reference in the Northeast region thanks to the priest.

== Musical events ==
On July 6, 2013, during the worst drought in 60 years in the Brazilian Wilderness (Sertão), a Christian music band Diante do Trono recorded its sixteenth work in Juazeiro do Norte, Tu Reinas album was recorded at Park Events Padre Cicero brought together approximately 50,000 people who came from all parts of Brazil, was the largest event in Juazeiro do Norte and across the Sertão region.
