= Crato, Ceará =

Municipality in Ceará, Brazil

Crato
- Municipality
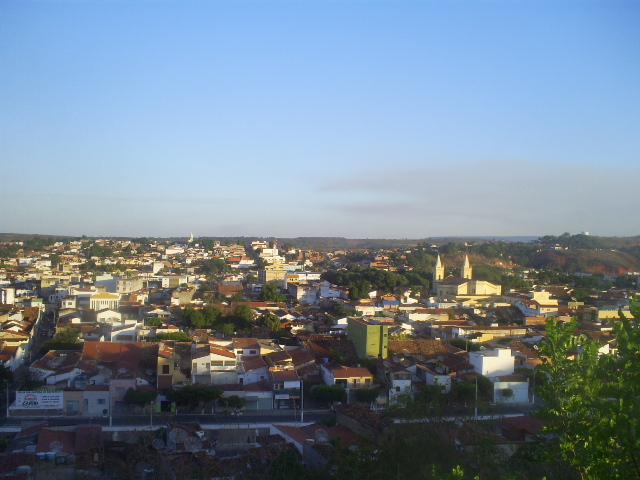

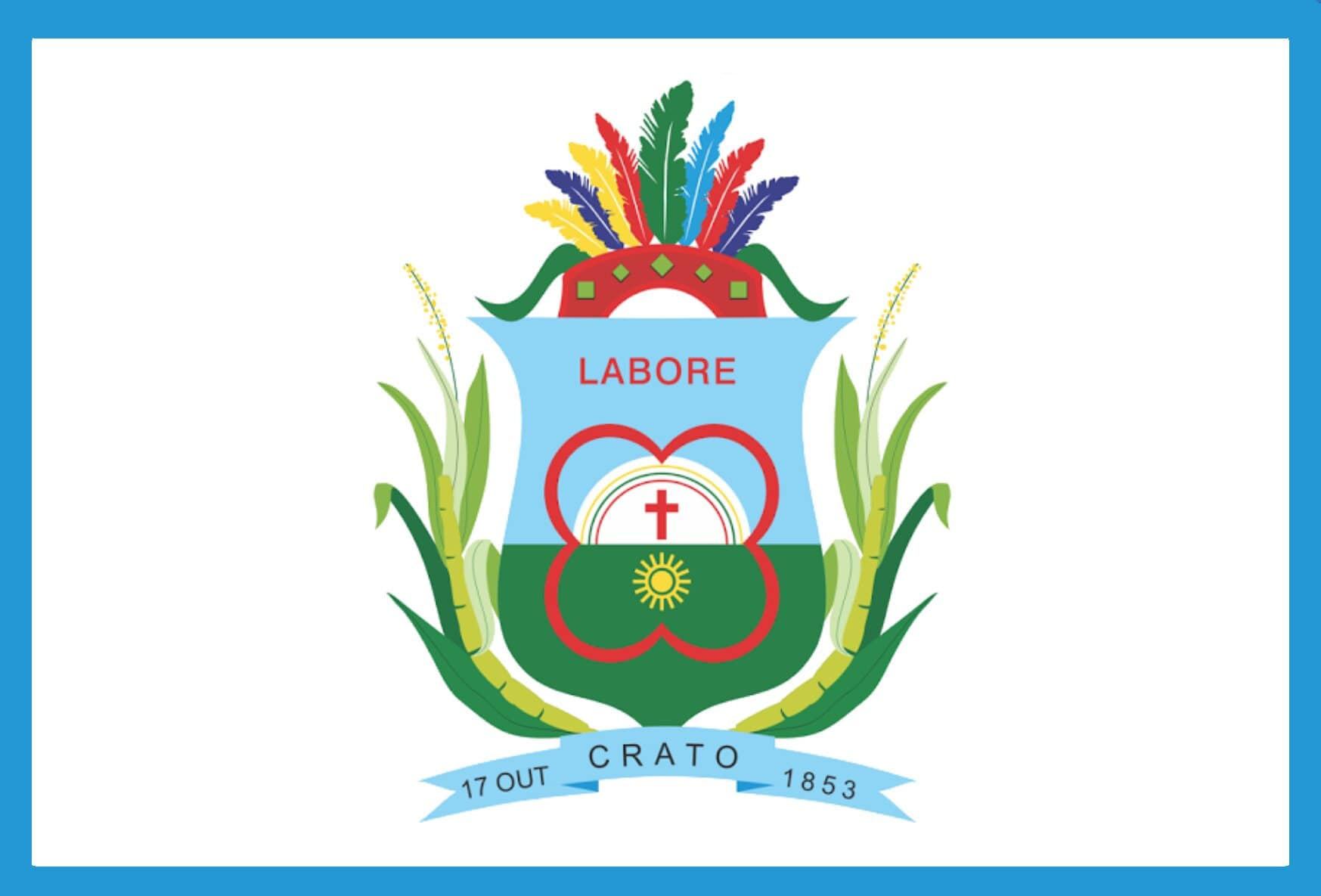
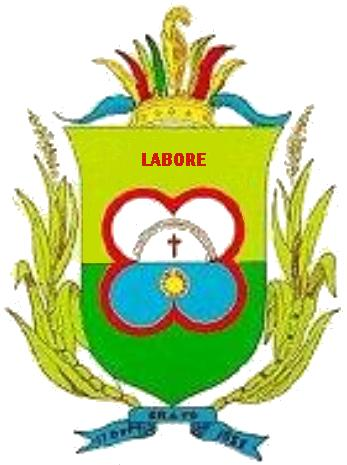
- Flag Coat of arms

- Location of Crato in the state Ceará

- Location in Brazil
- Coordinates: 7°14′02″S 39°24′32″W
- Country: Brazil
- Region: Nordeste
- State: Ceará
- Mesoregion: Sul Cearense

Government
  - Mayor: André Barreto Esmeraldo

Area
  - Total: 454.236 sq mi (1,176.467 km^{2})

Population (2022 Census)
  - Total: 131,050
  - Estimate (2025): 139,027
  - Density: 288.51/sq mi (111.39/km^{2})
- Time zone: UTC−3 (BRT)

Crato is a city of 130,000 inhabitants on the banks of the river Granjeiro in the south of the state of Ceará, in the northeast of Brazil. It was founded on June 21, 1764, by the Capuchin friar Carlos Maria de Ferrara. Originally it was a small village in which the population were principally native Kariris, it gained official status as a city on October 17, 1817.

The Brazilian city of Crato was named in honor to Crato, a Portuguese town which was founded in the 13th century.

The people of Crato credit their city's blossoming to a priest, Padre Cicero, who was outcast from the nearby town of Juazeiro do Norte in the late 1800s and settled in Crato with his various followers thereafter. Various images and statues of the priest can be found around Crato as a sign of appreciation for the priest.

Crato is about 550 km from Fortaleza, the capital of the state of Ceará. Its county has a surface area of approximately 1,117 km^{2}. It is at an altitude of 426m, 07°14′03″S 39°24′34″W. Its population of 110,000 makes it the sixth-largest city in Ceará. The economy is a mix of trading and agriculture; as of 2004, a small industrial park is expanding. The region is rich in minerals, especially gypsum and marble.

Crato has its Roman Catholic Diocese which has contributed to the educational system of the region with schools in the past. For the most recent data (2007) the city has 5.3 in the classification of the development index of basic education (for primary education, IDEB) - this index ranges from 0 to 10. The national average is 3.8 and that of the state of Ceará is 6.1 (the fourth place in the country).

In higher education, in addition to hosting campuses at the Federal University of Cariri (UFCA) and the Federal Institute of Technological Education (IFCE), the city is home to the state institution Universidade Regional do Cariri (URCA), which has around 10,000 students. Several private higher education institutions are active in the city.

The city is surrounded by a tropical wood in the Araripe basin (Serra do Araripe) near the border of the state of Pernambuco. the climate is generally mild, with somewhat more rain than is typical of the region.

Crato is connected to the nearby city of Juazeiro do Norte by a commuter rail line called the Cariri Metro that opened in 2009–2010.

== See also ==
- List of municipalities in Ceará
