= List of Belo Horizonte Metro stations =

This is a list of Belo Horizonte Metro stations, excluding abandoned, projected, planned stations, and those under construction.

== List of active stations ==
| Line | Name | Transfer | Opened |
|---|---|---|---|
| Line 1 | Novo Eldorado | No | 9 February 2026 |
| Line 1 | Eldorado | No | 1 August 1986 |
| Line 1 | Cidade Industrial | No | 1 August 1986 |
| Line 1 | Vila Oeste | No | 30 July 1999 |
| Line 1 | Gameleira | No | 1 August 1986 |
| Line 1 | Calafate | No | 1 August 1986 |
| Line 1 | Carlos Prates | No | 1 August 1986 |
| Line 1 | Lagoinha | No | 1 August 1986 |
| Line 1 | Central | No | April 1987 |
| Line 1 | Santa Efigênia | No | April 1992 |
| Line 1 | Santa Tereza | No | December 1993 |
| Line 1 | Horto | No | December 1992 |
| Line 1 | Santa Inês | No | December 1994 |
| Line 1 | José Cândido da Silveira | No | April 1997 |
| Line 1 | Minas Shopping | No | April 1997 |
| Line 1 | São Gabriel | No | 5 January 2002 |
| Line 1 | Primeiro de Maio | No | April 2002 |
| Line 1 | Waldomiro Lobo | No | July 2002 |
| Line 1 | Floramar | No | July 2002 |
| Line 1 | Vilarinho | No | 20 September 2002 |
| Line 2 | Amazonas | No | 3 July 2026 |
| Lines 1 and 2 | Nova Suíça | Yes | 3 July 2026 |
