= Rapid transit in Brazil =

Overview of the rapid transit system in Brazil

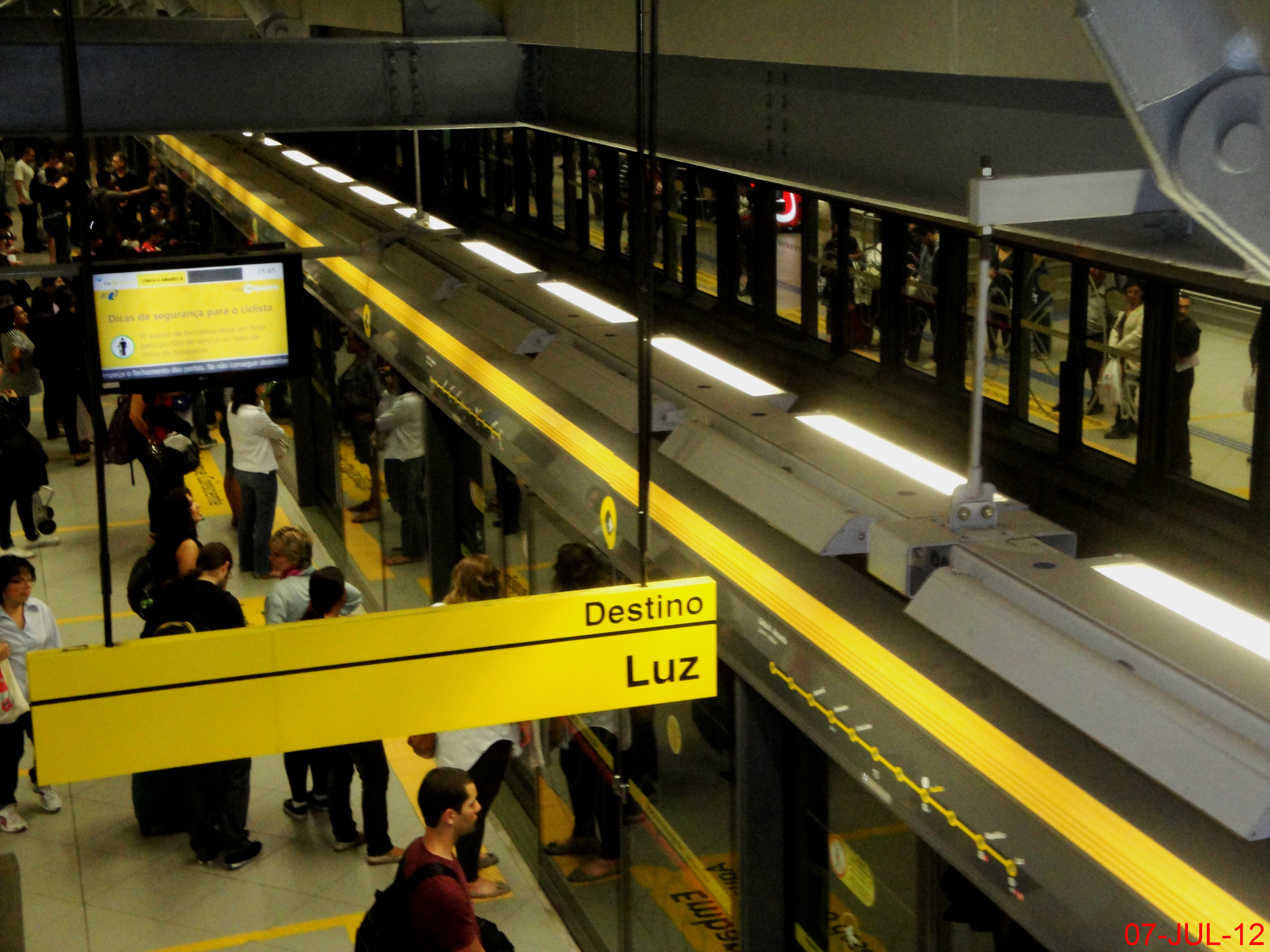
República Station on São Paulo Metro Line 4

Rapid transit in Brazil is characterized by rail-based systems for regional passenger flow and mass transit, such as light rail, subways, and urban train networks. These systems are concentrated primarily in the Brazilian Southeast and Northeast regions, home to its major urban centers. The São Paulo Metro is the 3rd largest in Latin America, featuring eight lines spanning 116.2 kilometers; it serves as the third most important mode of transport for the metropolis's 11.4 million residents, having been the public transport system that saw the most growth in the city between 2007 and 2017.

Most public transport rail systems in Brazil operate on electric power supplied via overhead lines, such as the Belo Horizonte Metro and the Baixada Santista Light Rail, or through an energized third rail or APS technology, as seen with the Rio de Janeiro Light Rail. Some networks, primarily located in the Northeast, are not electric but diesel-powered, such as the Teresina Metro and the urban trains operated by CBTU in the region.

The cities with a metro system are São Paulo, Belo Horizonte, Rio de Janeiro, Porto Alegre, Salvador, Fortaleza, Recife, and Brasília, built between 1974 and 2014. There are also regions with light rail or urban rail systems, such as Sobral, Crato, Juazeiro do Norte, Rio de Janeiro, Baixada Santista, João Pessoa, Natal, and Maceió. There also was one suburban rail system in Pindamonhangaba, operated by the Campos do Jordão Railway, but it has had its operations paused since 2021.

== Current expansion projects ==
Map of Belo Horizonte Metro Line 2

=== Belo Horizonte Metro ===
Following the concession of the metro system to the Comporte Group, and utilizing federal and state investment, construction resumed on Line 2 of the Belo Horizonte Metro, which is set to connect the Nova Suíça to Barreiro.

The expansion of Line 1 to the Novo Eldorado station was completed in February 2026, and the federal government announced investments for the construction of the Beatriz and Parque São João stations in Contagem Municipality. The Nova Suíça and Amazonas stations on Line 2 opened in July and are currently in partial operation.

=== São Paulo Metro ===
Line 2-Green is being expanded by 8 new stations over an 8.4-kilometer stretch, creating approximately 3,500 direct jobs and serving 320,000 passengers per workday. The expansion will make the Green Line the longest in the system, spanning 23 kilometers.

For Monorail Line 15-Silver, one of the few active monorail lines in the country, the construction of the Jacu-Pêssego, Ipiranga, and Boa Esperança stations is planned along a one-kilometer stretch. The deadline for the line to begin operations has been pushed back to 2029, contrasting with the initial forecast of 2027. The future Ipiranga station has already reached the concrete-pouring stage for the main structure's first floor, while the interior areas of the other two planned stations have begun receiving structural finishes and component assembly.

== List of metro and monorail systems in Brazil ==
=== Operational ===
City	System	Start of operations	System length	Lines	Stations	Gauge	Operator
Belo Horizonte	Belo Horizonte Metro	1986	32 km (18.5 mi)	2	22	1,600 mm (5 ft 3 in)	Metrô BH
Brasília	Federal District Metro	2001	42.4 km (26.3 mi)	2	27	1,600 mm (5 ft 3 in)	Companhia do Metropolitano do Distrito Federal (Metrô-DF)
Porto Alegre	Porto Alegre Metro	1985	43.8 km (27.2 mi)	1	22	1,600 mm (5 ft 3 in)	Empresa de Trens Urbanos de Porto Alegre (TRENSURB)
Recife	Recife Metro	1985	39.5 km (24.5 mi)	3	37	1,600 mm (5 ft 3 in)	Companhia Brasileira de Trens Urbanos (CBTU)
Rio de Janeiro	Rio de Janeiro Metro	1979	58 km (36 mi)	3	41	1,600 mm (5 ft 3 in)	Concessão Metroviária do Rio de Janeiro (MetrôRio)
Salvador	Salvador Metro	2014	38 km (24 mi)	2	21	1,435 mm (4 ft 8 1/2 in)	Companhia do Metrô da Bahia (CCR Metrô Bahia)
Fortaleza	Fortaleza Metro	2012	24.1 km (15.0 mi)	3	20	1,000 mm (3 ft 3 3/8 in)	Companhia Cearense de Transportes Metropolitanos (METROFOR)
São Paulo	São Paulo Metro	1974	116.2 km (64.8 mi)	8	105	1,600 mm (5 ft 3 in), 1,435 mm (4 ft 8 1/2 in)	Companhia do Metropolitano de São Paulo (Lines 1–3, 15); ViaQuatro (Line 4); ViaMobilidade (Line 5)

=== Proposed ===
City	System	Start of operations	System length	Lines	Stations	Gauge	Operator
Curitiba	Curitiba Metro	Proposed	17.6 km (10.9 mi)	1	14	1,435 mm (4 ft 8 1/2 in)	
Manaus	Manaus Monorail	Planned	20 km (12.0 mi)	1	9	None	

=== Discontinued ===
City	System	Start of operations	End of operations	System length	Lines	Stations	Gauge	Operator
Poços de caldas	Poços de Caldas Monorail	2000	2003	8 km (4.9 mi) constructed, 30 km (18.6 mi) planned	1	11	None	Municipal Government of Poços de Caldas
Campinas	Campinas Light Metro	1990	1995	7.9 km (4.5 mi)	1	11 stations planned, 8 stations constructed	1,600 mm (5 ft 3 in)	Ferrovia Paulista (FEPASA)

Metro systems in Brazil

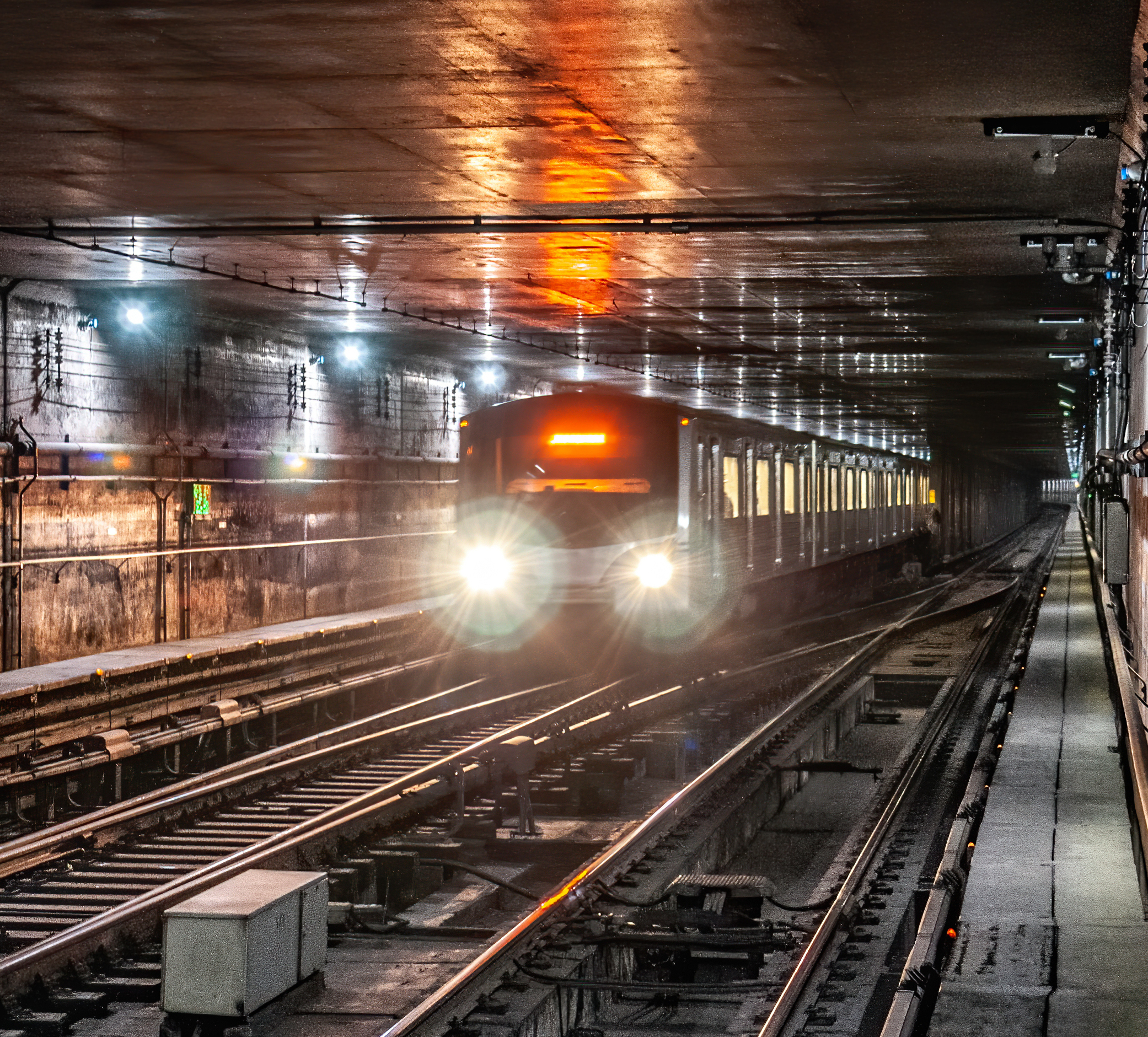
São Paulo Metro train arriving at Luz Station, Line 1

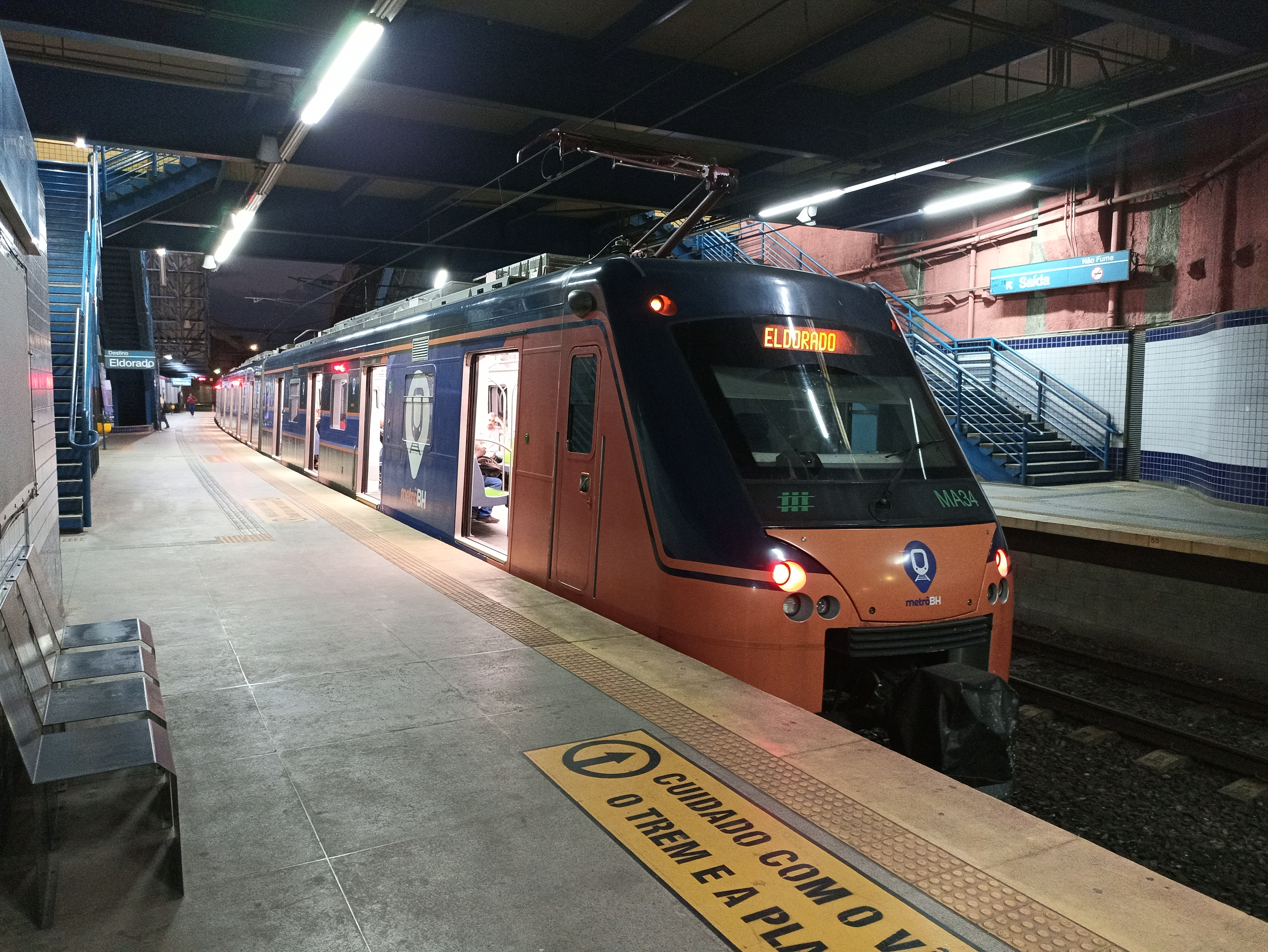
1000 Series EMU at Waldomiro Lobo Station on Line 1 of the Belo Horizonte Metro

== List of Light Rail Systems in Brazil ==
=== Operational ===
City	System	Start of operations	System length	Lines	Stations	Gauge	Operator
Sobral	Sobral Light Rail	2014	13.9 km (8.6 mi)	2	12	1000mm (3 ft 3.4 in)	Companhia Cearense de Transportes Metropolitanos (METROFOR)
Crato, Juazeiro do Norte	Cariri Light Rail	2009	13.9 km (8.5 mi)	1	9	1000mm (3 ft 3.4 in)	Companhia Cearense de Transportes Metropolitanos (METROFOR)
Santos, São Vincente	Baixada Santista Light Rail	2015	11,5 km (7,15 mi)	1	15	1,435 mm (4 ft 8 1/2 in)	BR Mobilidade Consortium (supervised by ARTESP, the São Paulo State regulatory body for transportation)
Rio de Janeiro	VLT Carioca	2016	28 km (17,4 mi)	4	30	1,435 mm (4 ft 8 1/2 in)	VLT Carioca
Metropolitan Area of Salvador	VLT do Subúrbio	2027-2028	37 km (22.9 mi)	3	34	1,435 mm (4 ft 8 1/2 in)	To be determined by the government
Teresina	Teresina Metro	1991	16 km	1	12	1000 mm (3 ft 3.4 in)	Companhia Ferroviária e de Logística do Piauí (CFLP)

=== Discontinued ===
City	System	Start of operations	End of operations	System length	Lines	Stations	Gauge	Operator
Cuiabá	Cuiabá Light Rail	The construction was never completed	Construction was interrupted in 2015	22.2 km (13.7 mi)	2	33	1,435 mm (4 ft 8 1/2 in)	

Light Rail Systems in Brazil

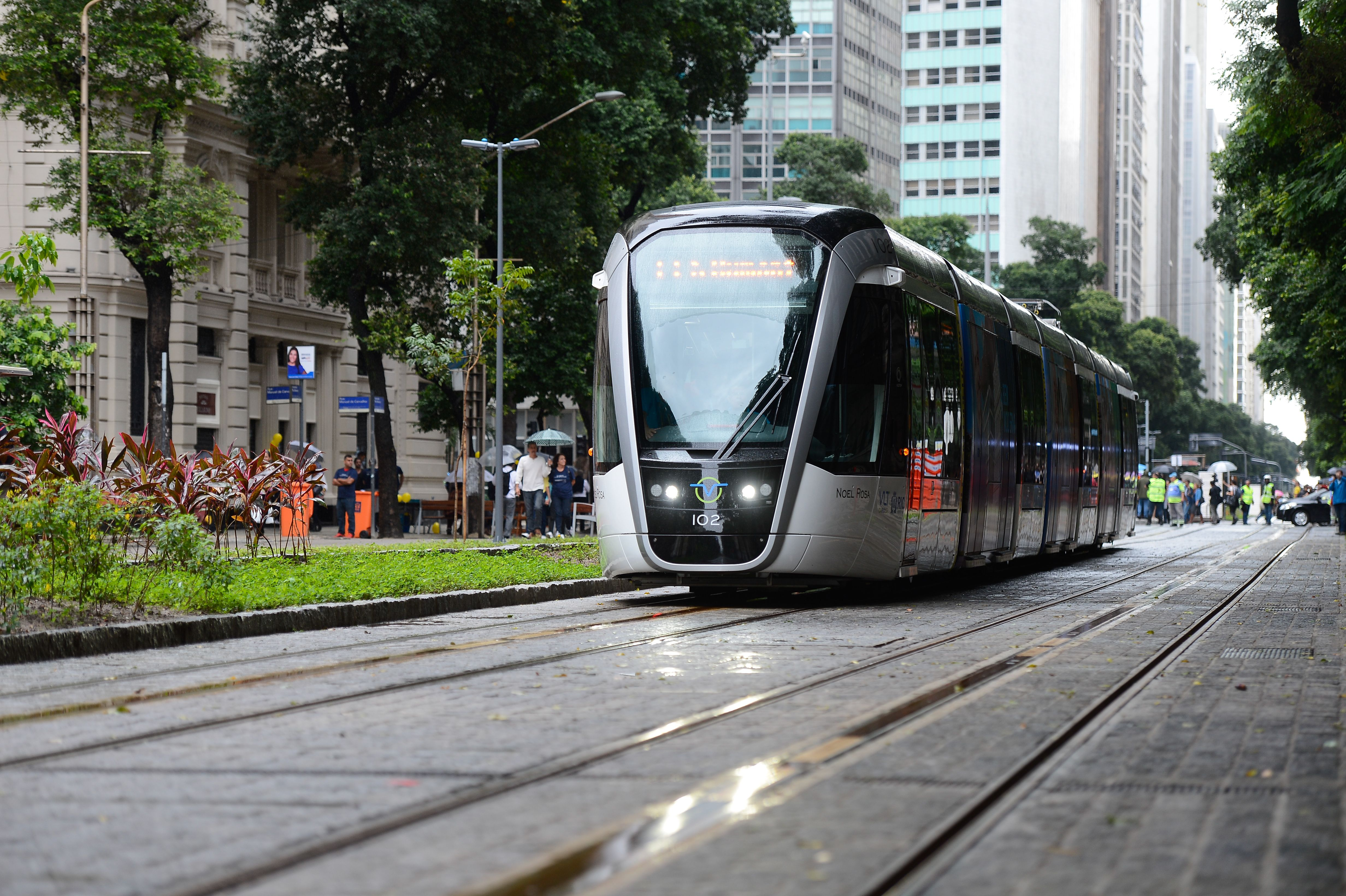
Alstom Citadis 402 of the VLT Carioca during its inaugural trip in downtown Rio de Janeiro

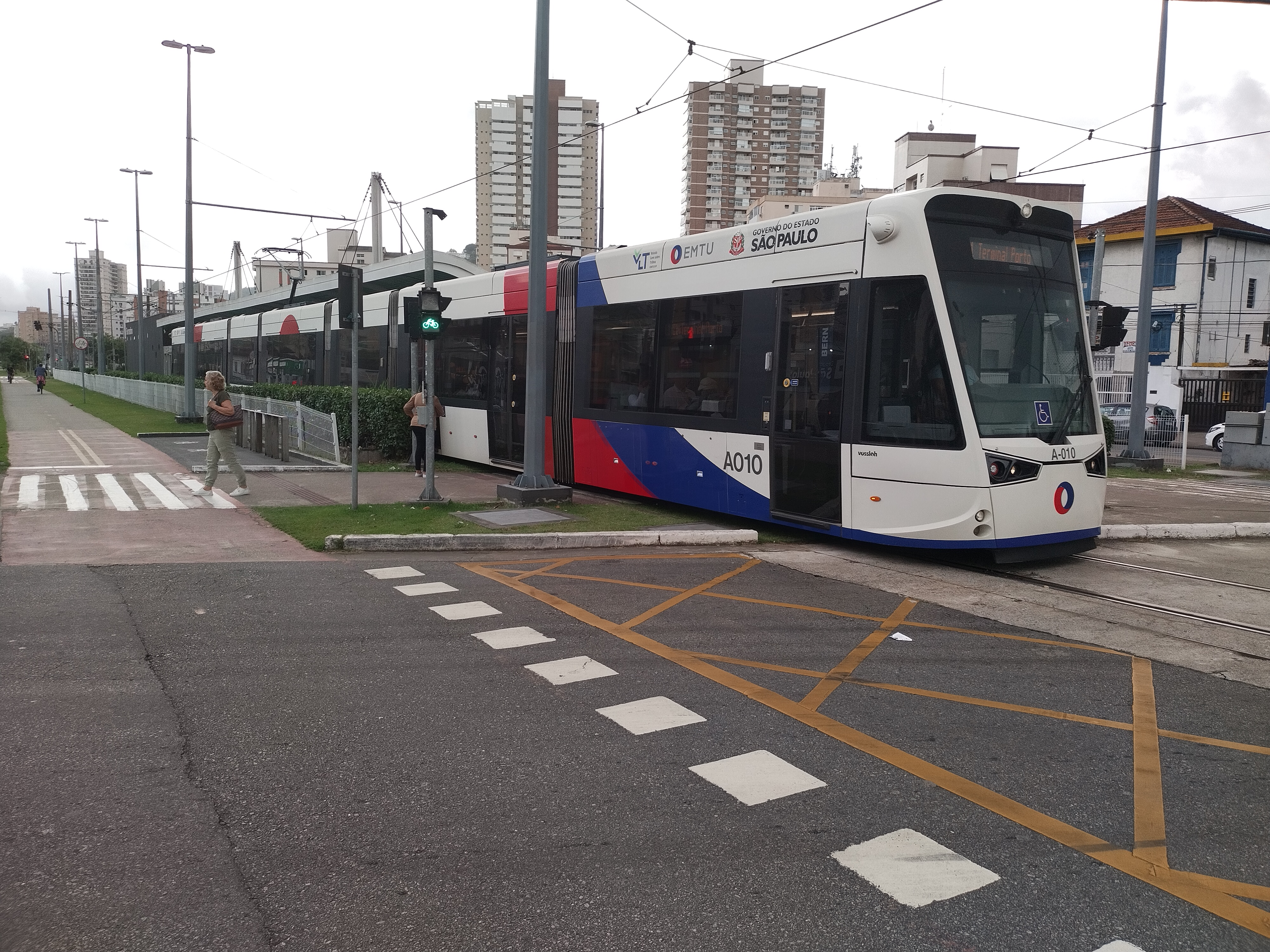
Vossloh Tramlink V4 tram of the Baixada Santista light rail at Bernardino de Campos Station

== Suburban Rail ==
=== Operational ===
City	System	Start of operations	System length	Lines	Stations	Gauge	Operator
São Paulo	São Paulo Metropolitan Trains	1889	280 km	7	96	1,600 mm (5 ft 3 in)	Companhia Paulista de Trens Metropolitanos (Lines 7, 10, 11, 12, 13) ViaMobilidade (Lines 8 and 9)
João Pessoa	João Pessoa Urban Train System	1985	30 km (18.6 mi)	1	9	1000mm (3 ft 3.4 in)	Companhia Brasileira de Trens Urbanos (CBTU)
Rio de Janeiro	Urban Trains of Rio de Janeiro	1852	270 km	8	104	1,600 mm (5 ft 3 in)1000mm (3 ft 3.4 in)	TrensRJ
Campos do Jordão	Campos do Jordão Railway	1914	47 km	1	40	1000mm (3 ft 3.4 in)	Estrada de Ferro Campos do Jordão (EFCJ)
Natal	Natal Urban Train System	1984	77.5 km (48.1 mi)	2	13	1000mm (3 ft 3.4 in)	Companhia Brasileira de Trens Urbanos (CBTU)
Maceió	Maceió Urban Train System	2011	34.7 km (21,2 mi)	2	15	1000mm (3 ft 3.4 in)	Companhia Brasileira de Trens Urbanos (CBTU)

=== Discontinued ===
City	System	Start of operations	End of operations	System length	Lines	Stations	Gauge	Operator
Belo Horizonte	Metropolitan Area of Belo Horizonte Suburban Train	1957	1988	321 km	7	21	1 600 mm (5 ft 3 in)	Rede Ferroviária Federal (1957-1984), Companhia Brasileira de Trens Urbanos (1984-1992)
Bauru	Bauru Urban Train	1973, 1988	1982, 1990	10.0 km (6.21 mi)	2	9	1000mm (3 ft 3.4 in), 1,600 mm (5 ft 3 in)	Ferrovia Paulista (FEPASA), Rede Ferroviária Federal (RFFSA)

Suburban Rail Systems in Brazil

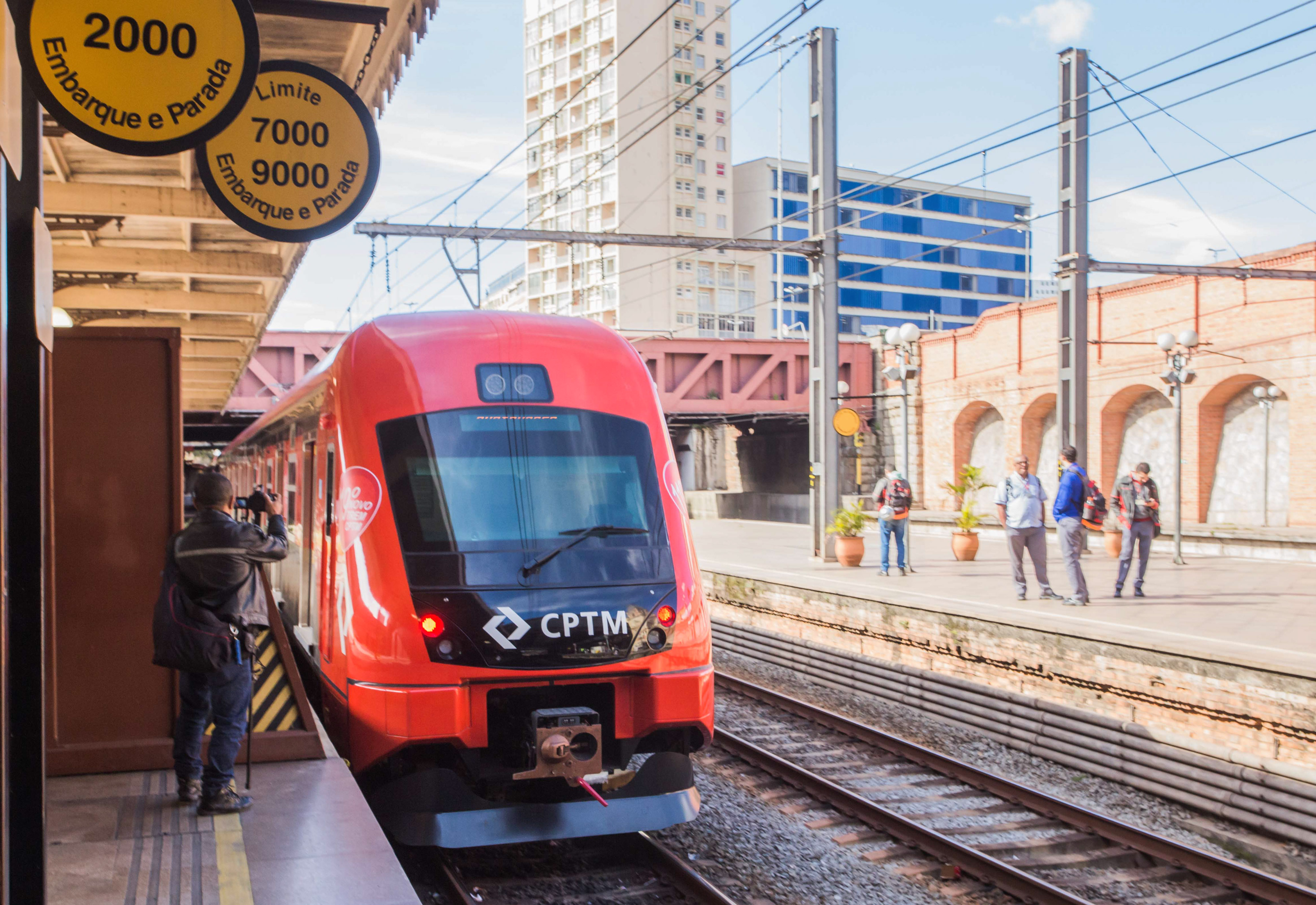
CPTM Coral Line Train

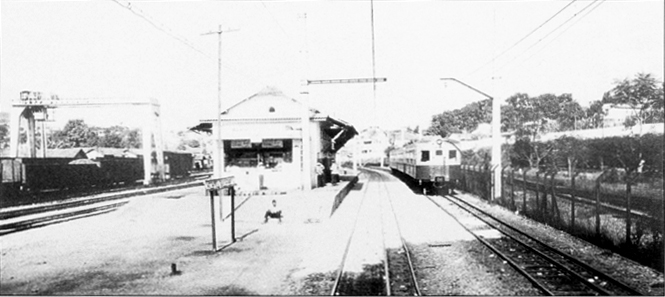
A Series 100 electric train unit at Horto Florestal station, Belo Horizonte.

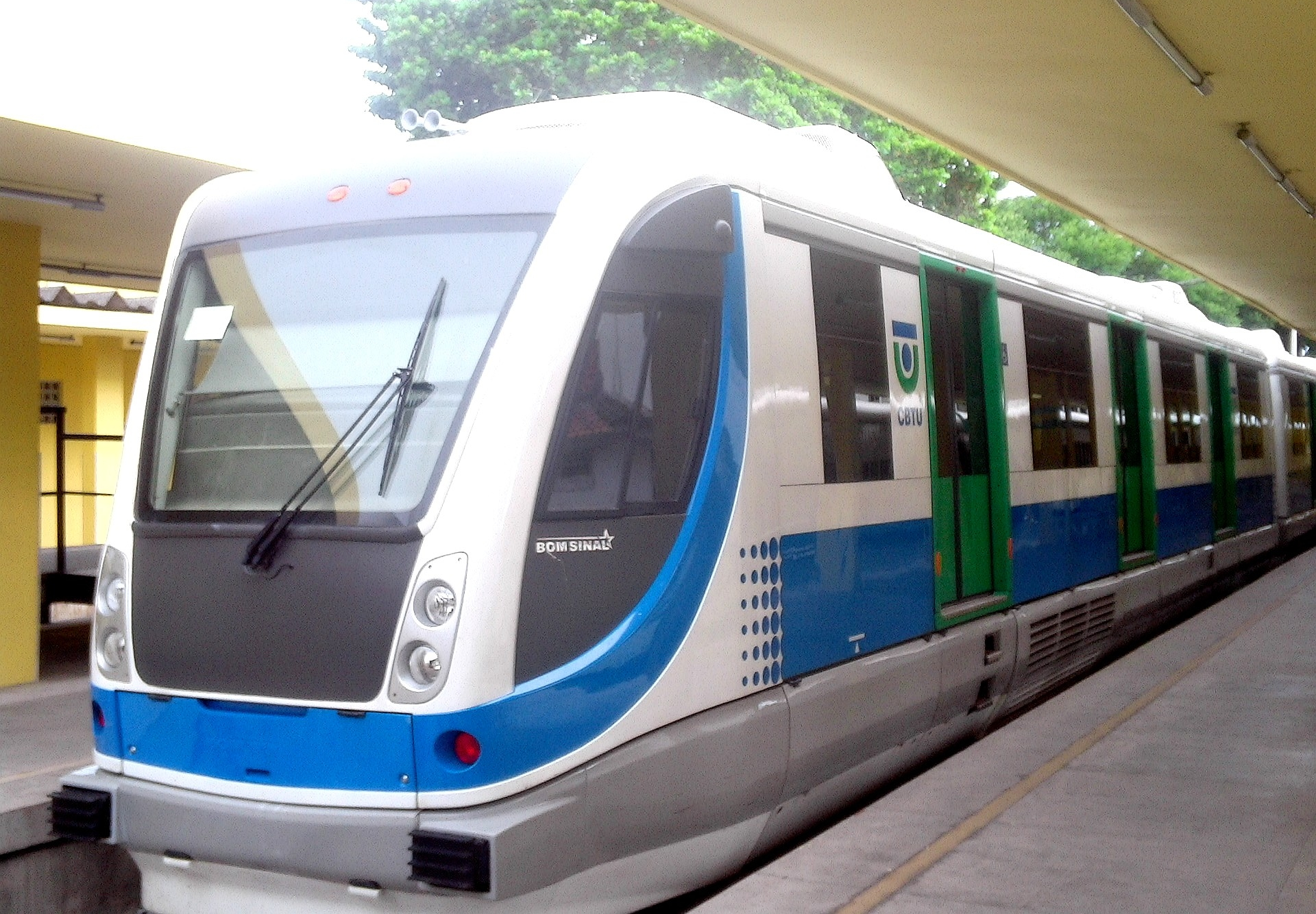
TUDH model Mobile 3 manufactured by Bom Sinal of the Maceió Urban Train System

== See also ==
- São Paulo Metro
- Rapid Transit
- Transport in Brazil
