= Gameleira station =

Belo Horizonte metro station

Gameleira
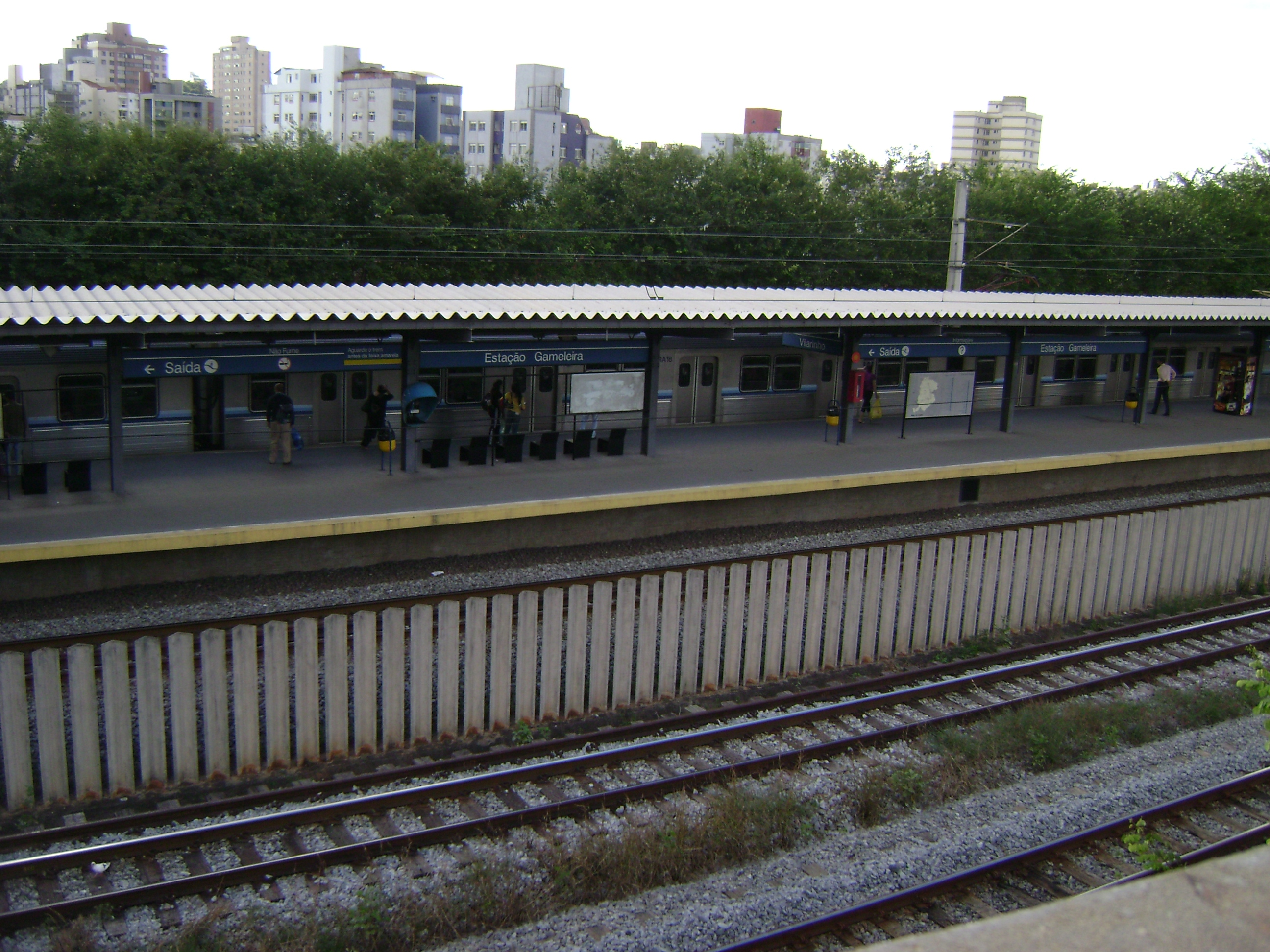
- Gameleira subway station in Belo Horizonte.

General information
- Location: Brazil
- Coordinates: 19°55′41.3″S 43°59′18.7″W
- System: Belo Horizonte Metro station
- Line: Line 1

History
- Opened: 1 August 1986

Services
Preceding station	Belo Horizonte Metro	Following station
Vila Oeste towards Novo Eldorado	Line 1	Nova Suíça towards Vilarinho
Location

Gameleira is a Belo Horizonte Metro station on Line 1. It was opened on 1 August 1986 as part of the inaugural section of the line, from Eldorado to Lagoinha. The station is located between Vila Oeste and Nova Suíça.
