= Calafate station =

Belo Horizonte metro station

Calafate
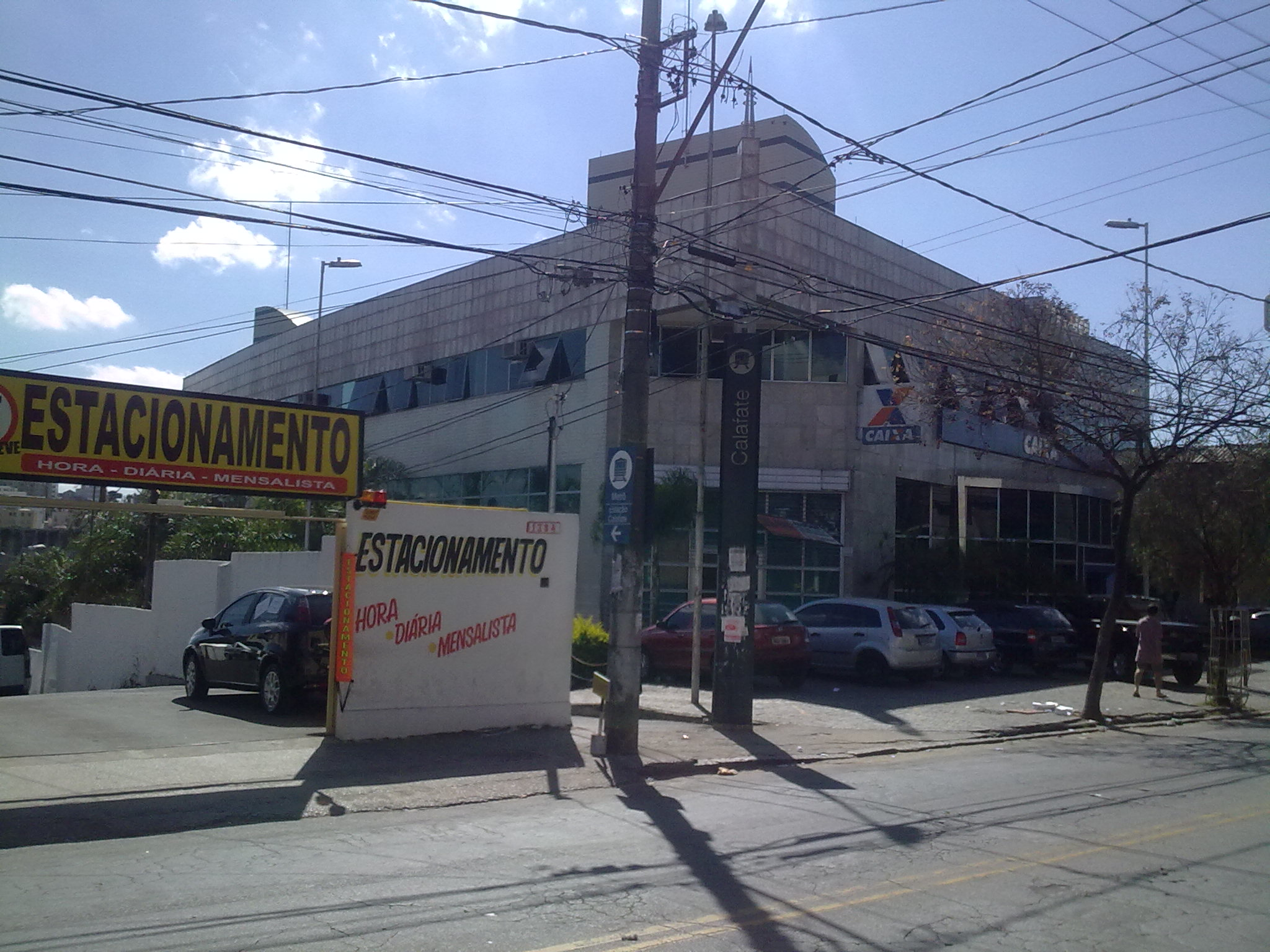
- Entrance to the subway station Calafate, in Belo Horizonte, Brazil

General information
- Location: Brazil
- Coordinates: 19°55′20.5″S 43°58′12.4″W
- System: Belo Horizonte Metro station
- Line: Line 1

History
- Opened: 1 August 1986

Services
Preceding station	Belo Horizonte Metro	Following station
Nova Suíça towards Novo Eldorado	Line 1	Carlos Prates towards Vilarinho
Location

Calafate is a Belo Horizonte Metro station on Line 1. It was opened on 1 August 1986 as part of the inaugural section of the line, from Eldorado to Lagoinha. The station is located between Nova Suíça and Carlos Prates.
