= Vila Oeste station =

Belo Horizonte metro station

Vila Oeste
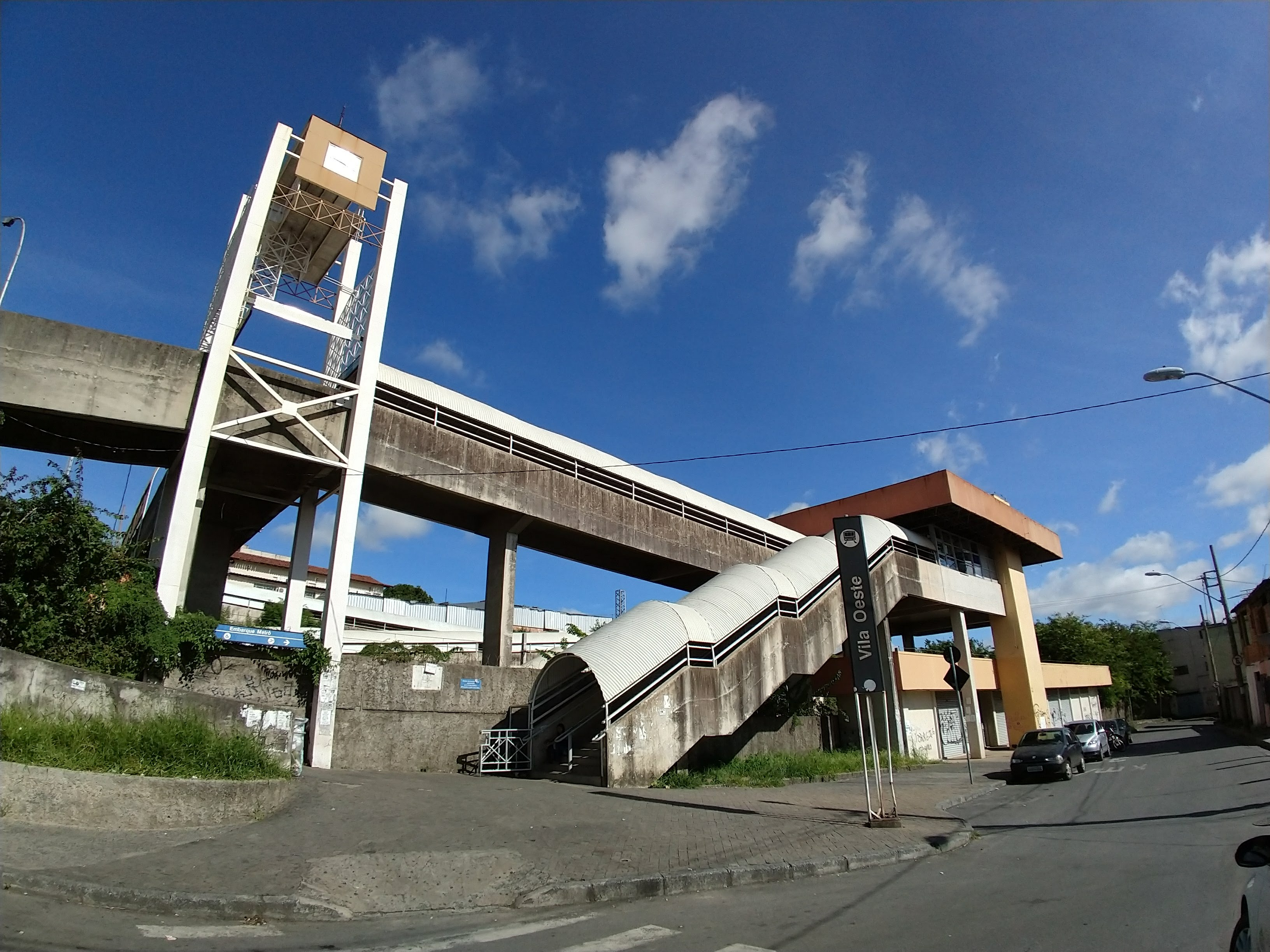
- Vila Oeste Station, in Belo Horizonte, Minas Gerais

General information
- Location: Brazil
- Coordinates: 19°56′19.2″S 44°00′10.8″W
- System: Belo Horizonte Metro station
- Line: Line 1

History
- Opened: 30 July 1999

Services
Preceding station	Belo Horizonte Metro	Following station
Cidade Industrial towards Novo Eldorado	Line 1	Gameleira towards Vilarinho
Location

Cidade Industrial is a Belo Horizonte Metro station on Line 1. It was opened on 30 July 1999, being added to already functioning section of the line from Eldorado to Minas Shopping. The station is located between Cidade Industrial and Gameleira.
