= Cidade Industrial station =

Belo Horizonte metro station

Cidade Industrial
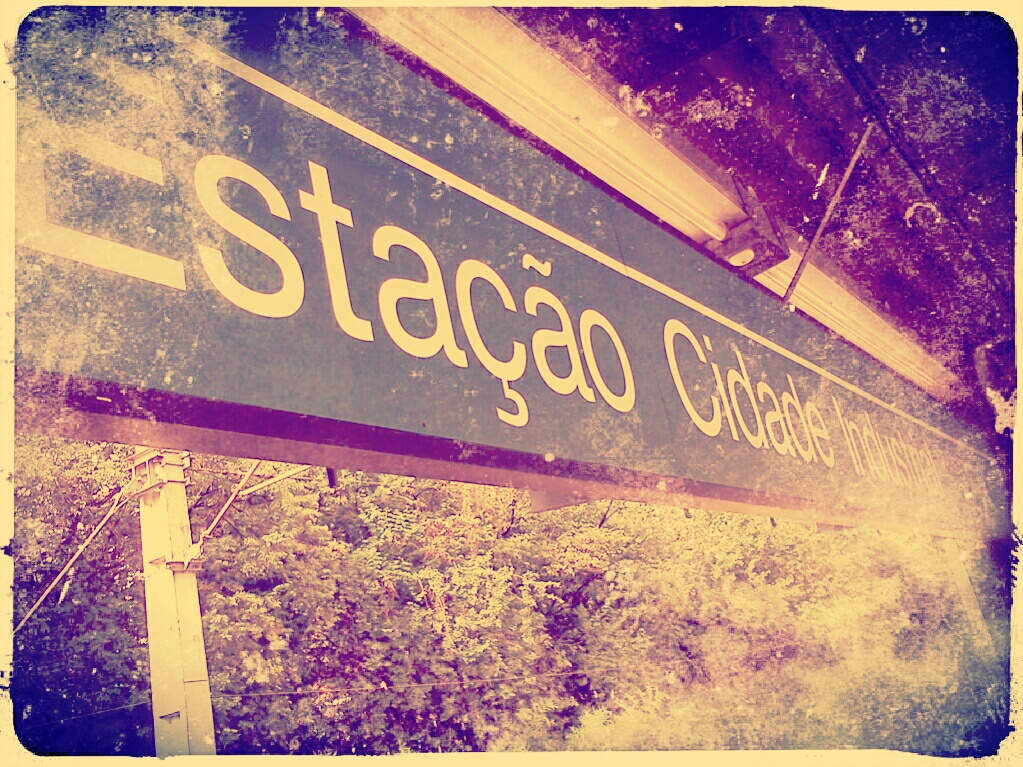

General information
- Location: Brazil
- Coordinates: 19°56′43.8″S 44°00′59.2″W
- System: Belo Horizonte Metro station
- Line: Line 1

History
- Opened: 1 August 1986

Services
Preceding station	Belo Horizonte Metro	Following station
Eldorado towards Novo Eldorado	Line 1	Vila Oeste towards Vilarinho
Location

Cidade Industrial is a Belo Horizonte Metro station on Line 1. It was opened on 1 August 1986 as part of the inaugural section of the line, from Eldorado to Lagoinha. The station is located between Eldorado and Vila Oeste.
