= Carlos Prates station =

Belo Horizonte metro station

Carlos Prates

General information
- Location: Brazil
- Coordinates: 19°55′05.3″S 43°57′26.3″W
- System: Belo Horizonte Metro station
- Line: Line 1

History
- Opened: 1 August 1986

Services
Preceding station	Belo Horizonte Metro	Following station
Calafate towards Novo Eldorado	Line 1	Lagoinha towards Vilarinho
Location

Carlos Prates is a Belo Horizonte Metro station on Line 1. It was opened on 1 August 1986 as part of the inaugural section of the line, from Eldorado to Lagoinha. The station is located between Calafate and Lagoinha.
