= Central station (Belo Horizonte Metro) =

Belo Horizonte metro station

Central
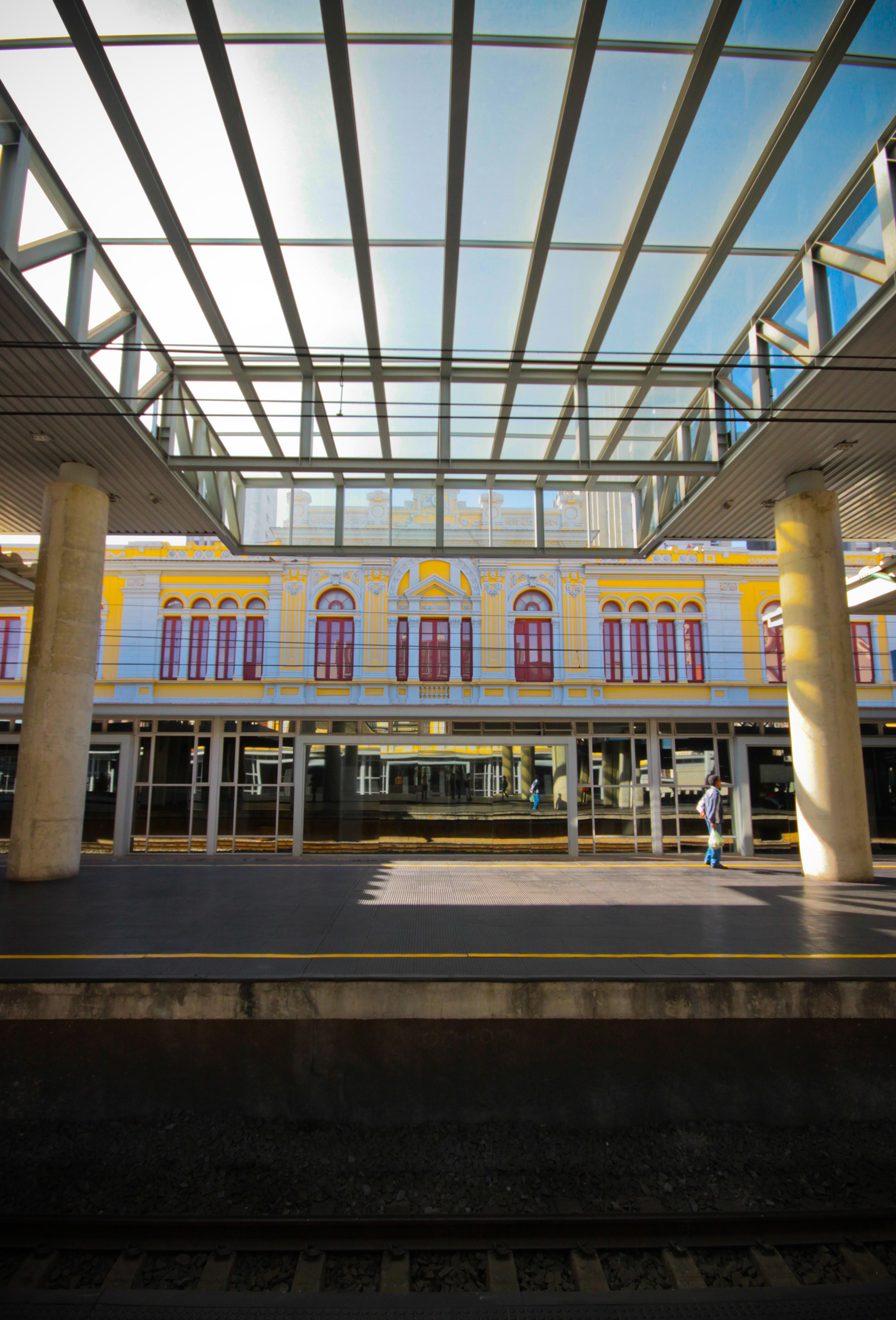
- Architecture of the Belo Horizonte Metro Central Station.

General information
- Location: Brazil
- Coordinates: 19°55′03.3″S 43°55′59.6″W
- System: Belo Horizonte Metro station
- Line: Line 1

History
- Opened: April 1987

Services
| Preceding station | Belo Horizonte Metro | Following station |
|---|---|---|
| Lagoinha towards Novo Eldorado | Line 1 | Santa Efigênia towards Vilarinho |
| Preceding station | Vale S.A. | Following station |
At nearby heavy rail station
| Terminus | Vitória-Minas Railway | Barão de Cocais towards Pedro Nolasco |
Location

Central is a Belo Horizonte Metro station on Line 1. It was opened in April 1987 as a one-station extension of the line from Lagoinha. In April 1992 the line was extended to Santa Efigênia. The station is located between Lagoinha and Santa Efigênia.
