= Santa Efigênia station =

Belo Horizonte metro station

Santa Efigênia

General information
- Location: Brazil
- Coordinates: 19°55′10.4″S 43°55′20.1″W
- System: Belo Horizonte Metro station
- Line: Line 1

History
- Opened: April 1992

Services
Preceding station	Belo Horizonte Metro	Following station
Central towards Novo Eldorado	Line 1	Santa Tereza towards Vilarinho
Location

Santa Efigênia is a Belo Horizonte Metro station on Line 1. It was opened in April 1992 as a one-station extension of the line from Central. In December 1992 the line was extended to Horto. The station is located between Central and Santa Tereza.
