= Santa Tereza station =

Belo Horizonte metro station

Santa Tereza
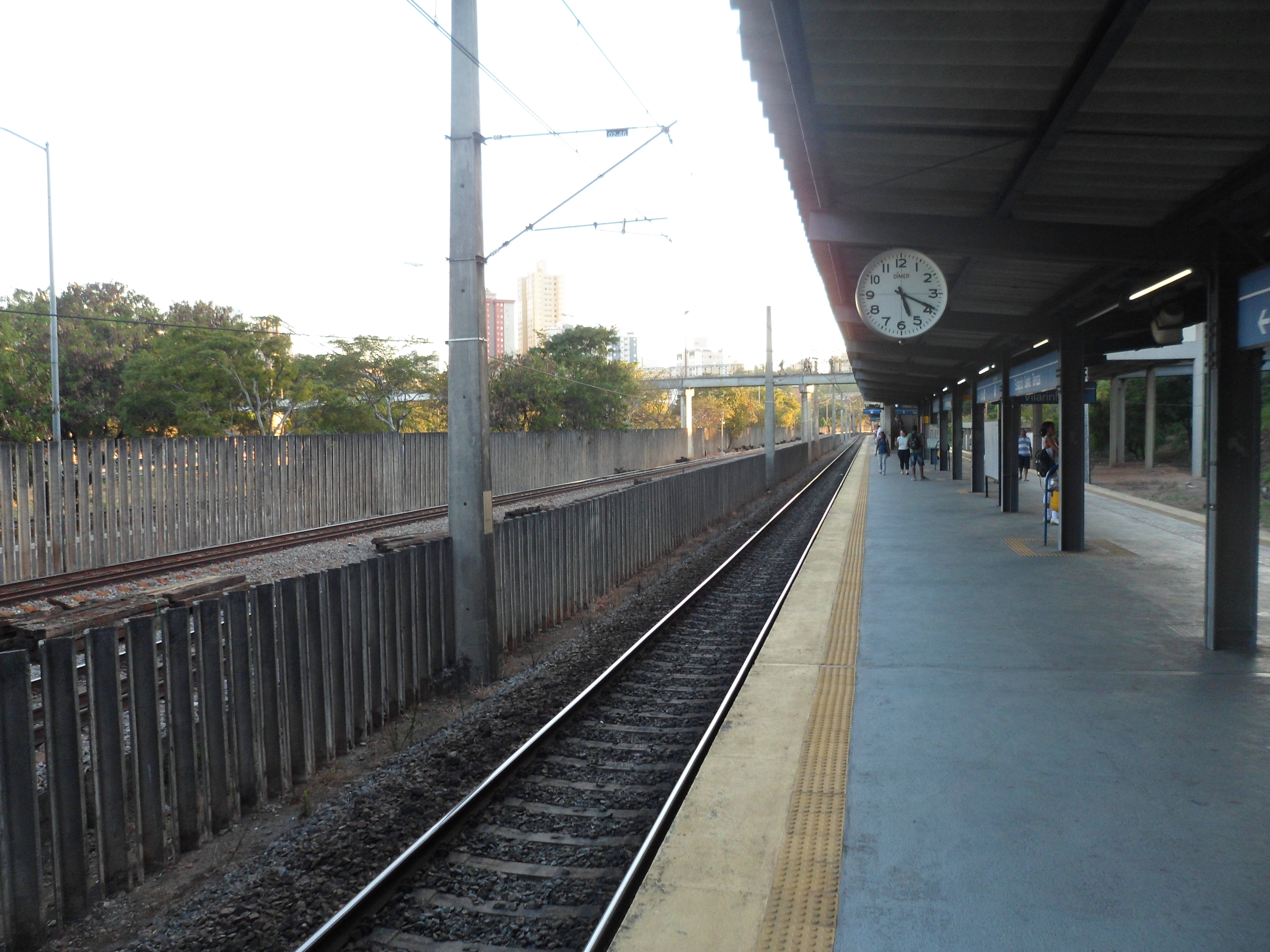
- Station Platform

General information
- Location: Brazil
- Coordinates: 19°55′04.4″S 43°54′45.8″W
- System: Belo Horizonte Metro station
- Line: Line 1

History
- Opened: December 1993

Services
Preceding station	Belo Horizonte Metro	Following station
Santa Efigênia towards Novo Eldorado	Line 1	Horto towards Vilarinho
Location

Santa Tereza is a Belo Horizonte Metro station on Line 1. It was added in December 1993 to already operating line. The station is located between Santa Efigênia and Horto.
