= São Gabriel station =

Belo Horizonte metro station

São Gabriel
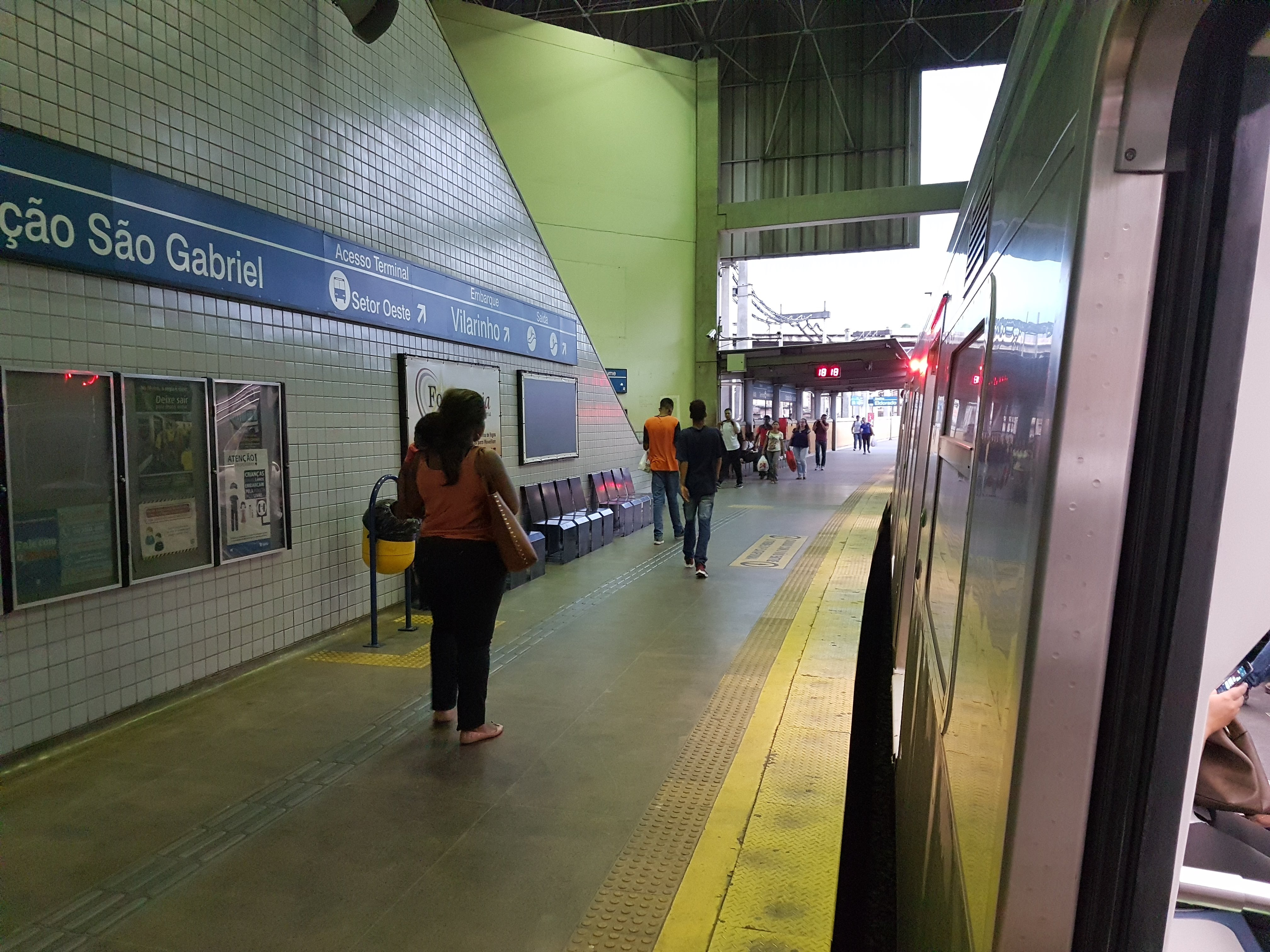

General information
- Location: Brazil
- Coordinates: 19°51′47.3″S 43°55′34.5″W
- System: Belo Horizonte Metro station
- Line: Line 1

History
- Opened: 5 January 2002

Services
Preceding station	Belo Horizonte Metro	Following station
Minas Shopping towards Novo Eldorado	Line 1	Primeiro de Maio towards Vilarinho
Location

São Gabriel is a Belo Horizonte Metro station on Line 1. It was opened on 5 January 2002 as a one-station extension of the line from Minas Shopping. In April 2002, the line was extended to Primeiro de Maio. The station is located between Minas Shopping and Primeiro de Maio.
