= Primeiro de Maio station =

Belo Horizonte metro station

Primeiro de Maio
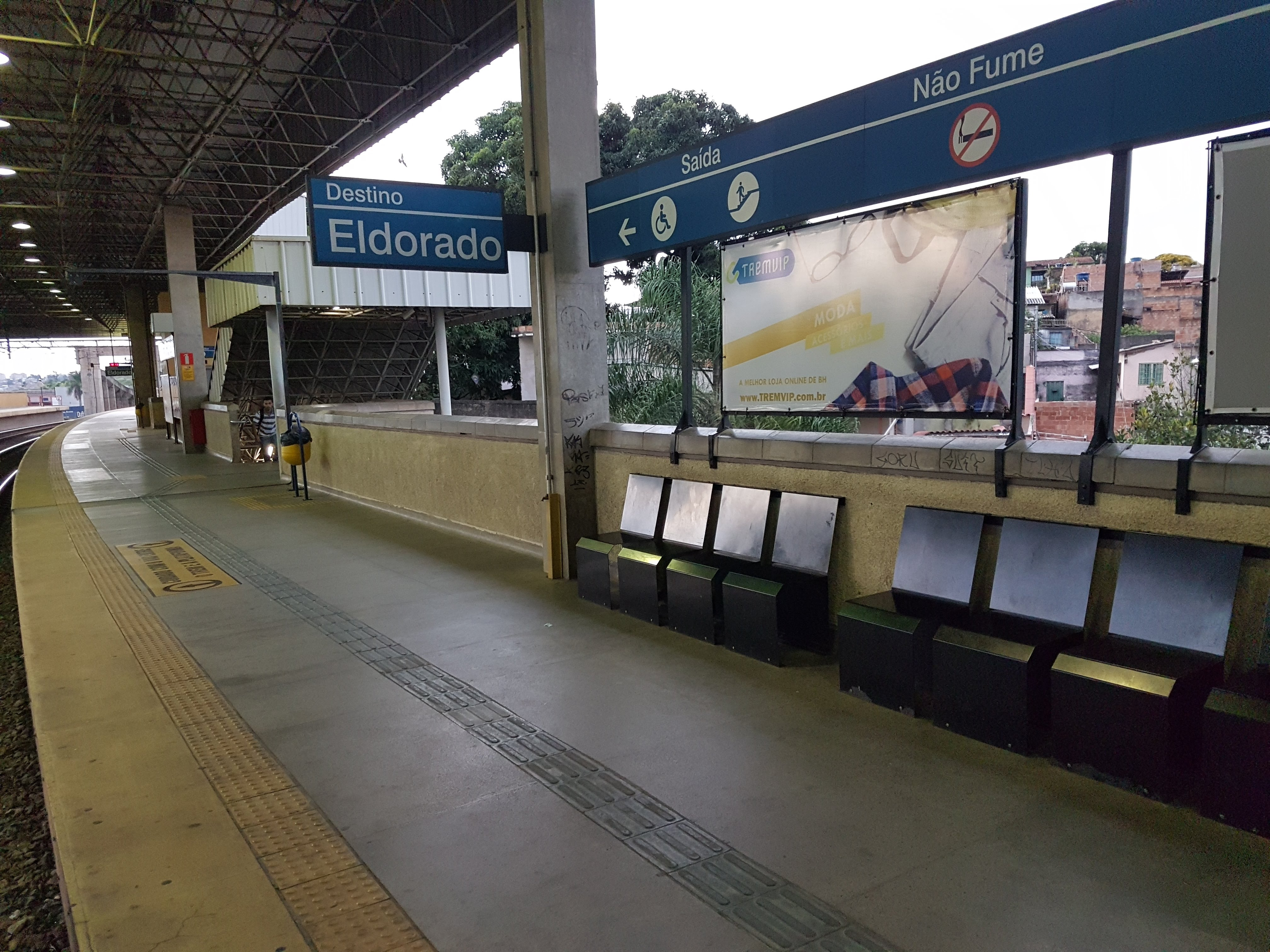
- Station Platform

General information
- Location: Brazil
- Coordinates: 19°51′28.7″S 43°56′02″W
- System: Belo Horizonte Metro station
- Line: Line 1

History
- Opened: April 2002

Services
Preceding station	Belo Horizonte Metro	Following station
São Gabriel towards Novo Eldorado	Line 1	Waldomiro Lobo towards Vilarinho
Location

Primeiro de Maio is a Belo Horizonte Metro station on Line 1. It was opened in April 2002 as a one-station extension of the line from São Gabriel. In July 2002, the line was extended to Floramar. The station is located between São Gabriel and Waldomiro Lobo.
