= Calafate =

Calafate may refer to:

- El Calafate, city in the Argentine province of Santa Cruz, in Patagonia
- Calafate station, a Belo Horizonte Metro station
- Calafate, Spanish name for berberis, a genus of shrubs commonly known as 'barberry'

== See also ==
- Calafat
- Caliphate
