= Floramar station =

Belo Horizonte metro station

Floramar
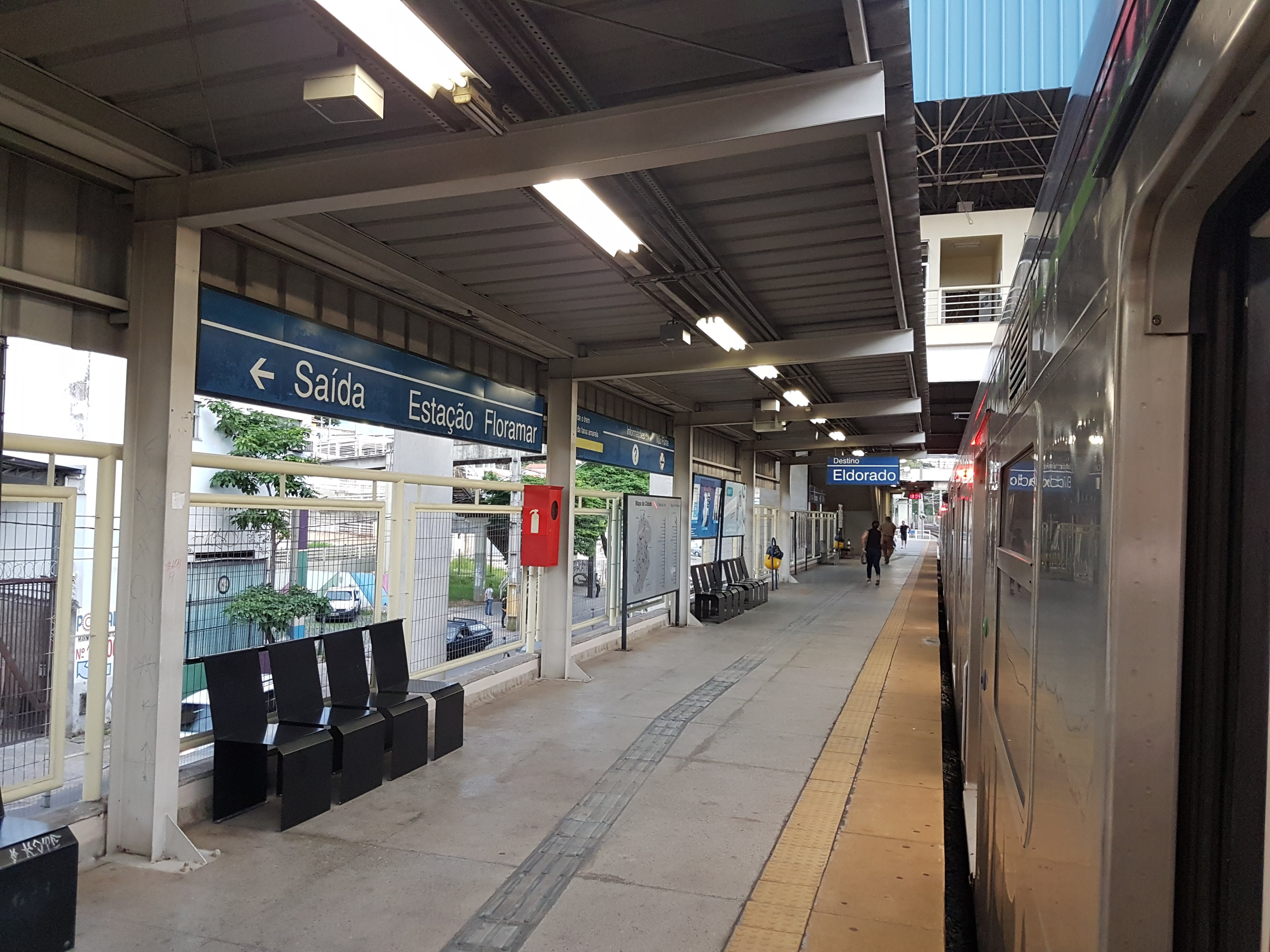

General information
- Location: Brazil
- Coordinates: 19°50′03″S 43°56′25.5″W
- System: Belo Horizonte Metro station
- Line: Line 1

History
- Opened: July 2002

Services
Preceding station	Belo Horizonte Metro	Following station
Waldomiro Lobo towards Novo Eldorado	Line 1	Vilarinho Terminus
Location

Floramar is a Belo Horizonte Metro station on Line 1. It was opened in July 2002 as the northern terminus of the two-station extension of the line from Primeiro de Maio to Floramar. On 20 September 2002, the line was extended to Vilarinho. The station is located between Floramar and Vilarinho.
