= Waldomiro Lobo station =

Belo Horizonte metro station

Waldomiro Lobo
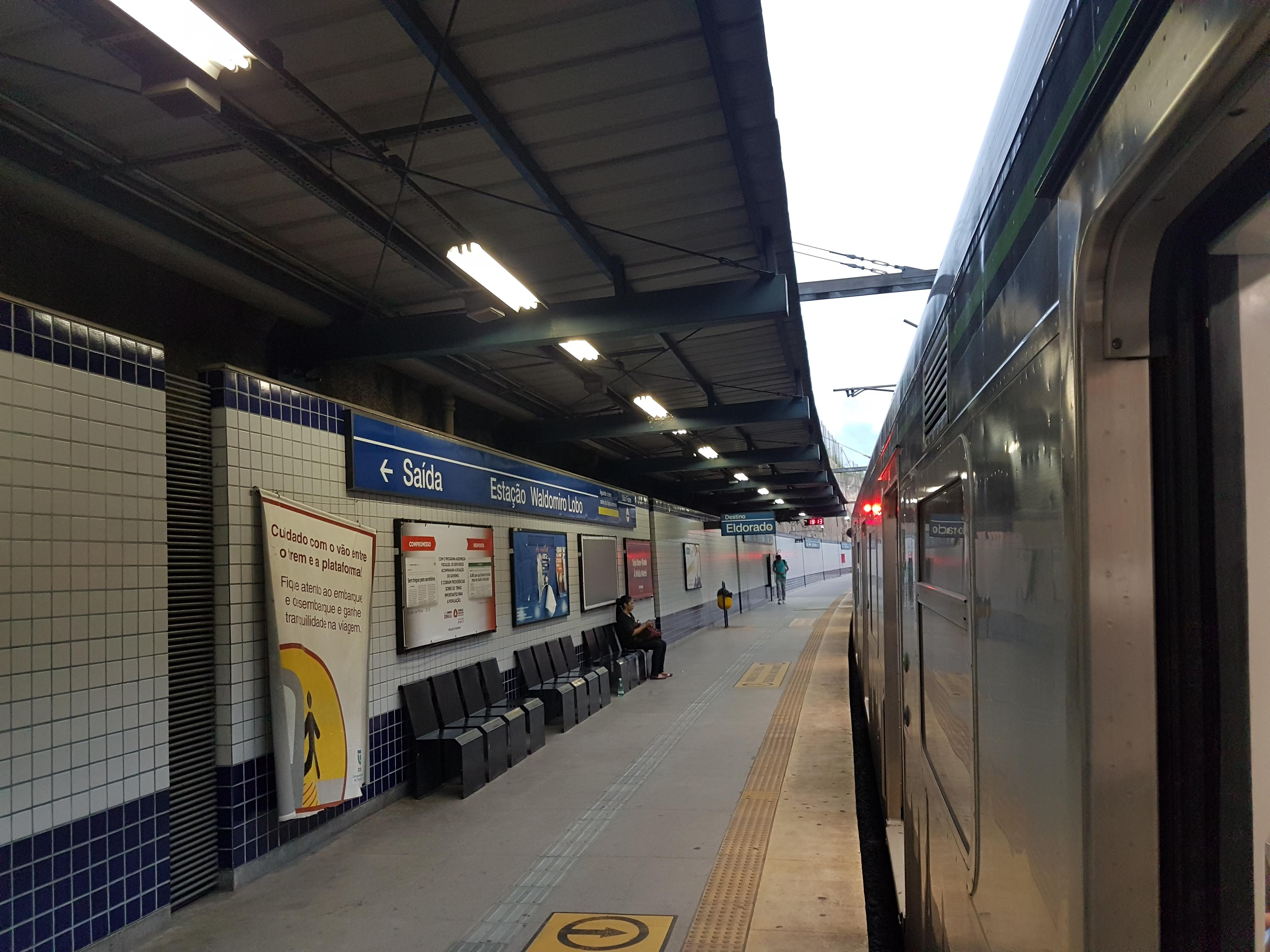
- Waldomiro Lobo Station Platform

General information
- Location: Brazil
- Coordinates: 19°50′52.1″S 43°55′57.6″W
- System: Belo Horizonte Metro station
- Line: Line 1

History
- Opened: July 2002

Services
Preceding station	Belo Horizonte Metro	Following station
Primeiro de Maio towards Novo Eldorado	Line 1	Floramar towards Vilarinho
Location

Waldomiro Lobo is a Belo Horizonte Metro station on Line 1. It was opened in July 2002 as part of a two-station extension of the line from Primeiro de Maio to Floramar. The station is located between Primeiro de Maio and Floramar.
