= Nova Suíça station =

Belo Horizonte metro station

Nova Suíça

General information
- Location: Brazil
- Coordinates: 19°55′29.5″S 43°58′44.1″W
- System: Belo Horizonte Metro station
- Line: Line 1, Line 2

History
- Opened: 3 July 2026

Services
Preceding station	Belo Horizonte Metro	Following station
Gameleira towards Novo Eldorado	Line 1	Calafate towards Vilarinho
Amazonas Terminus	Line 2	Terminus
Location

Nova Suíça is a Belo Horizonte Metro station on Line 1 and Line 2. It is the only transfer station of Belo Horizonte Metro and serves as the northern terminus of Line 2. It was opened on 3 July 2026 on the existing segment of Line 1, between Gameleira and Calafate. On the same day, the inaugural segment of Line 2 was opened for limited service. The segment consisted of two stations, Nova Suíça and Amazonas.
