= Horto station =

Belo Horizonte metro station

Horto

General information
- Location: Brazil
- Coordinates: 19°54′22″S 43°54′47.1″W
- System: Belo Horizonte Metro station
- Line: Line 1

History
- Opened: December 1992

Services
Preceding station	Belo Horizonte Metro	Following station
Santa Tereza towards Novo Eldorado	Line 1	Santa Inês towards Vilarinho
Location

Horto is a Belo Horizonte Metro station on Line 1. It was opened in December 1992 as a one-station extension of the line from Santa Efigênia; later, Santa Tereza was added in the middle of this extension. In December 1994, the line was extended to Santa Inês. The station is located between Santa Tereza and Santa Inês.
