= Amazonas station =

Belo Horizonte metro station

Amazonas

General information
- Location: Brazil
- Coordinates: 19°55′55″S 43°59′03″W
- System: Belo Horizonte Metro station
- Line: Line 2

History
- Opened: 3 July 2026

Services
Preceding station	Belo Horizonte Metro	Following station
Terminus	Line 2	Nova Suíça Terminus

Future services
Preceding station	Belo Horizonte Metro	Following station
Nova Gameleira towards Barreiro	Line 2 Opening 2028	Nova Suíça Terminus
Location

Amazonas is a Belo Horizonte Metro station on Line 2. It serves as the southern terminus of Line 2. It was opened on 3 July 2026 for limited service as part of the inaugural segment of Line 2. The segment consisted of two stations, Nova Suíça and Amazonas.
