= Lagoinha station =

Belo Horizonte metro station

Lagoinha
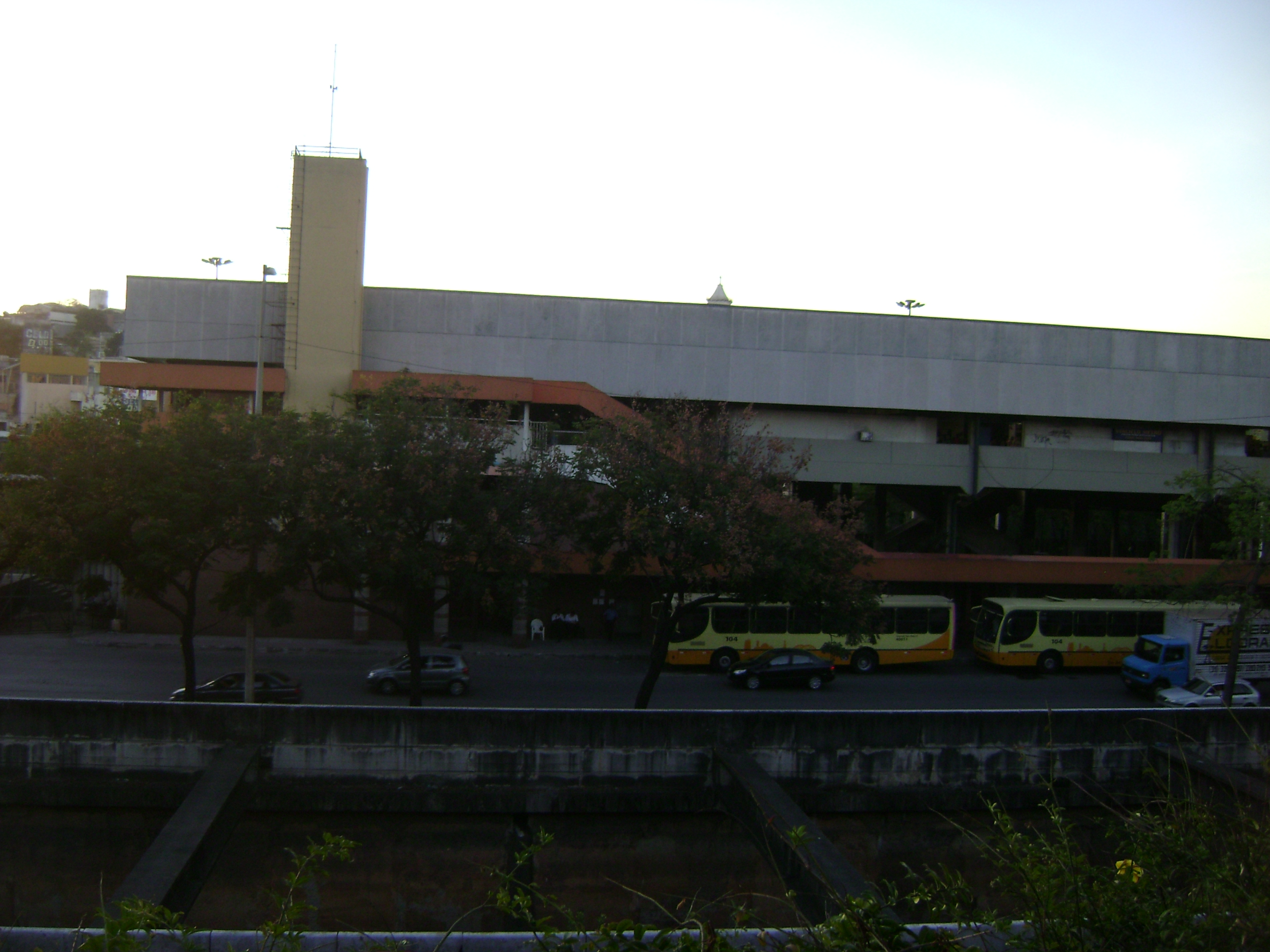

General information
- Location: Brazil
- Coordinates: 19°54′46.7″S 43°56′33.2″W
- System: Belo Horizonte Metro station
- Line: Line 1

History
- Opened: 1 August 1986

Services
Preceding station	Belo Horizonte Metro	Following station
Carlos Prates towards Novo Eldorado	Line 1	Central towards Vilarinho
Location

Lagoinha is a Belo Horizonte Metro station on Line 1. It was opened on 1 August 1986 as the eastern terminus of the inaugural section of the line, from Eldorado to Lagoinha. In April 1987, the line was extended to Central. The station is located between Carlos Prates and Central.

Situated on Avenida do Contorno, the station serves as a key transit hub by providing direct access to the city's main bus station, Terminal Rodoviário Governador Israel Pinheiro.
