= Metrô BH =

Brazilian rail transport company

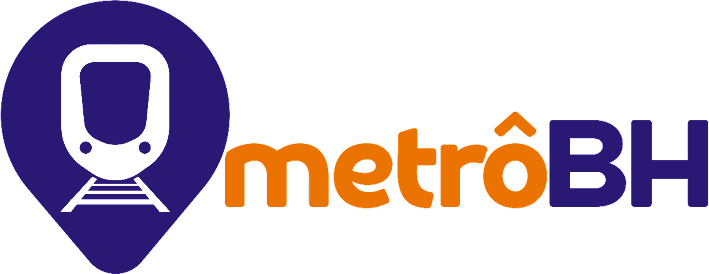
- Logo
- Type: Privately held company (S.A.)
- Industry: Rail transport
- Founded: 27 May 2022; 4 years ago
- Headquarters: Belo Horizonte, Brazil
- Area served: Greater Belo Horizonte
- Key people: Claudio Andrade (Chief Executive Officer)
- Products: Commuter transport
- Owner: Comporte Group
- Website: www.metrobh.com.br

Metrô BH is a privately held Brazilian company based in Belo Horizonte. It is a private concessionaire granted by the State Government of Minas Gerais for the management, maintenance, and operation of the Belo Horizonte Metro lines.

The company is part of the Comporte Group, a holding company that brings together several companies in the passenger and cargo transport sector, led by entrepreneurs Constantino de Oliveira, Henrique Constantino, and José Efraim Neves.

She has been responsible for the subway system in the capital of Minas Gerais since March 2023 and ithe National Association of Passenger Carriers on Rails (ANPTrilhos) member.

== History ==
The Belo Horizonte metro system was initially built and operated by CBTU (Companhia Brasileira de Trens Urbanos), a federal government-owned company. However, in 2019, both CBTU and Empresa de Trens Urbanos de Porto Alegre (Trensurb), another federal state-owned company in the rail passenger transport sector, were included in the Programa de Parcerias e Investimentos (PPI) of the then Ministry of Economy, with the aim of transferring control of state-owned companies and their systems to the private sector, with the effective participation of the respective states of the federation, which would receive the management of their systems in accordance with the criteria established in the Federal Constitution of 1988, and would be responsible for the execution and supervision of contracts with the new operators of their systems.

As the technical studies for the program were at a more advanced stage, the Belo Horizonte system would be the first to undergo the privatization process. In 2021, with the consent of the State Government of Minas Gerais, the process then moved on to the implementation phase. The Minas Gerais Government then became the new owner of the system, acting as the granting authority, conducting the auction, signing and supervising the contract with the new private concessionaire, as well as developing and coordinating projects for future expansion and the creation of new lines, and also conducting the concession bids for these projects. It also took over the co-management of CBTU/MG, which had already been completely separated from the national CBTU and was now controlled by Veículo de Desestatização de Minas Gerais Investimentos S/A (VDMG Investimentos), a company created as an instrument for conducting the bidding process and which would be fully transferred to the new private operator through the transfer of 100% of its share capital and assets.

The public notice was published on September 23, 2022, and the auction was held on December 22 of the same year at the São Paulo Stock Exchange headquarters.

The Comporte Group submitted a bid with a premium of 33.9% over the minimum concession value and was declared the winner of the tender, earning the right to operate lines 1 and 2 of the system for a period of 30 years. It was also tasked with carrying out all the expansion and modernization works proposed in the tender notice.

The concession agreement was signed on March 23, 2023. From then on, the Comporte Group assumed full control of VDMG Investimentos[2], immediately becoming responsible for controlling the service and adopting the Metrô BH brand to operate the system.

The entire operational transition process, which is standard practice in the sector, was carried out during the bureaucratic procedures of the concession process. This allowed the concessionaire to take over the management and operation of the system immediately after signing the contract.

== See also ==
- Belo Horizonte Metro
- Comporte Group (in Portuguese)
