= Eldorado station =

Belo Horizonte metro station

Eldorado
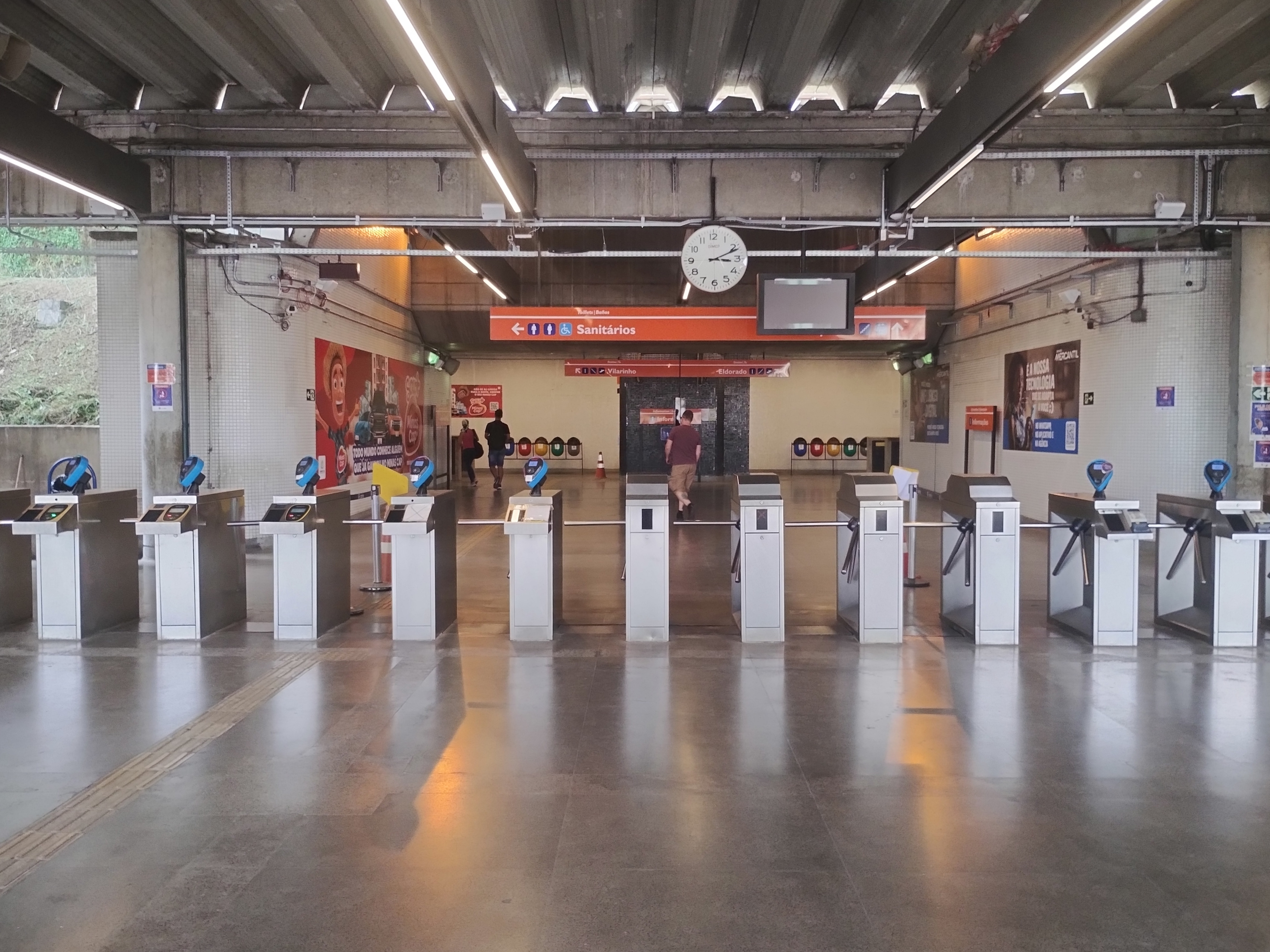
- Entrance to the station in 2024

General information
- Location: R. Jequitibás, 530 - Eldorado, Contagem; Minas Gerais; Brazil
- Coordinates: 19°56′18.4″S 44°01′47″W
- System: Belo Horizonte Metro station
- Operator: Belo Horizonte Metro
- Line: Line 1

History
- Opened: 1 August 1986

Services
Preceding station	Belo Horizonte Metro	Following station
Novo Eldorado Terminus	Line 1	Cidade Industrial towards Vilarinho
Location

Eldorado is a Belo Horizonte Metro station on Line 1. It was opened on 1 August 1986 as the southern terminus of the inaugural section of the line, from Eldorado to Lagoinha. The adjacent station is Cidade Industrial.
