= Novo Eldorado station =

Metro station in Belo Horizonte, Brazil

Novo Eldorado
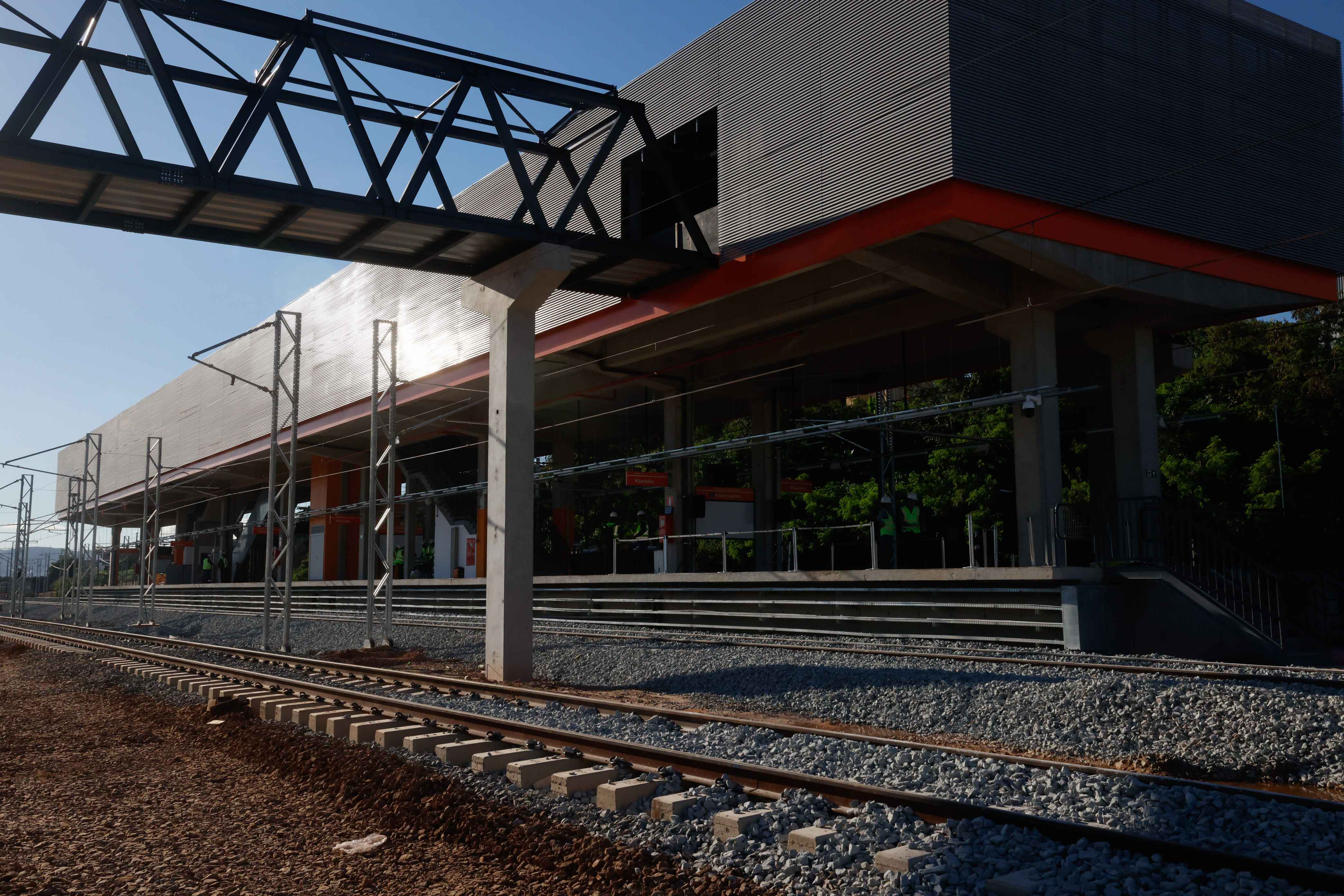

General information
- Location: Brazil
- Coordinates: 19°55′50″S 44°02′29.0″W
- System: Belo Horizonte Metro station
- Line: Line 1

History
- Opened: 9 February 2026

Services
Preceding station	Belo Horizonte Metro	Following station
Terminus	Line 1	Eldorado towards Vilarinho
Location

Novo Eldorado is a terminal station on Line 1 of the Belo Horizonte Metro, located in the municipality of Contagem. The station was opened in February 2026 and represented the first expansion of the metro system in approximately 20 years.

Construction of the Novo Eldorado station, on Line 1 of the Belo Horizonte Metro, began in 2024 with the demolition of the old Eldorado maintenance yard. The station was built in the municipality of Contagem and added 1.7 km (1.1 mi) of permanent track to the existing line. The initial opening date was projected for March 2026, but the concessionaire Metrô BH announced the possibility of bringing forward the opening to the end of 2025, aiming to increase transport capacity and meet the growing demand in the region. With an estimated investment of R$ 179 million, the Novo Eldorado Station is expected to increase the number of daily passengers on Line 1 by 35,000.
