= Vilarinho station =

Belo Horizonte metro station

Vilarinho
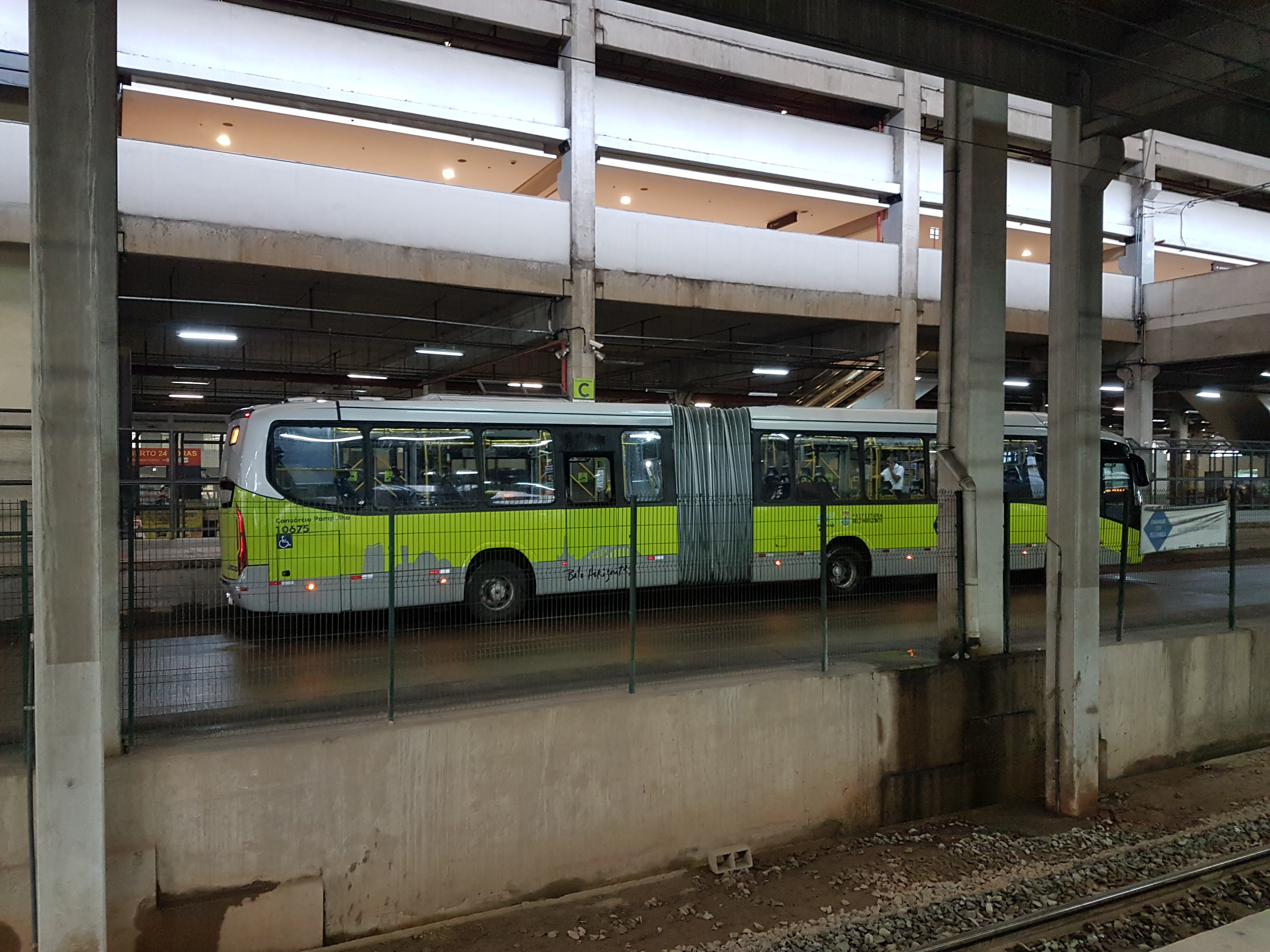
- Bus at Vilarinho Station, in Belo Horizonte, Minas Gerais, Brazil.

General information
- Location: Brazil
- Coordinates: 19°49′17.8″S 43°56′51.4″W
- System: Belo Horizonte Metro station
- Line: Line 1

History
- Opened: 20 September 2002

Services
Preceding station	Belo Horizonte Metro	Following station
Floramar towards Novo Eldorado	Line 1	Terminus
Location

Vilarinho is a Belo Horizonte Metro station on Line 1 which serves as the north terminus of the line. It was opened 20 September 2002 as a one-station extension of the line from Floramar. The adjacent station is Floramar.
