= Belo Horizonte Metro =

Rapid transit system in Belo Horizonte

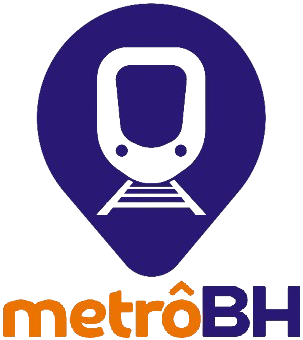

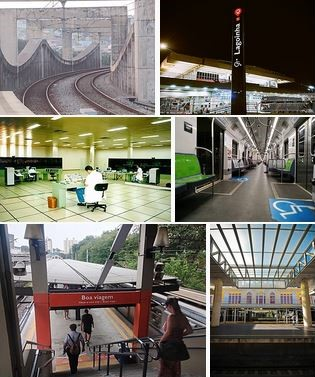

Overview
- Native name: Metrô de Belo Horizonte
- Owner: Government of Minas Gerais
- Area served: Belo Horizonte
- Locale: Belo Horizonte, Brazil
- Transit type: Rapid transit
- Number of lines: 2 (3 planned)
- Number of stations: 21 (1 planned)
- Daily ridership: 150.000 (2019)
- Annual ridership: 54.4 million (2019)
- Website: www.metrobh.com.br

Operation
- Began operation: 1 August 1986; 40 years ago
- Operator: Metrô BH
- Number of vehicles: 35

Technical
- System length: 29.7 km (18.5 mi) (In operation); 10.5 km (6.5 mi) (Under construction)
- Track gauge: 1,600 mm (5 ft 3 in)
- Electrification: 3,000 V DC from overhead catenary
- Average speed: 40 km/h (25 mph)
- Top speed: 80 km/h (50 mph)

Belo Horizonte Metro (Portuguese: Metrô de Belo Horizonte) is a rapid transit system serving the city of Belo Horizonte, in the state of Minas Gerais in Brazil. The system has one 28.1-kilometre (17.5 mi) line which serves 19 stations. The Metro carried 54.4 million passengers in 2019, or approximately 150,000 passengers per day. The system is operated by Metrô BH company, which is part of the Comporte Group. Two more lines are planned.

== History ==
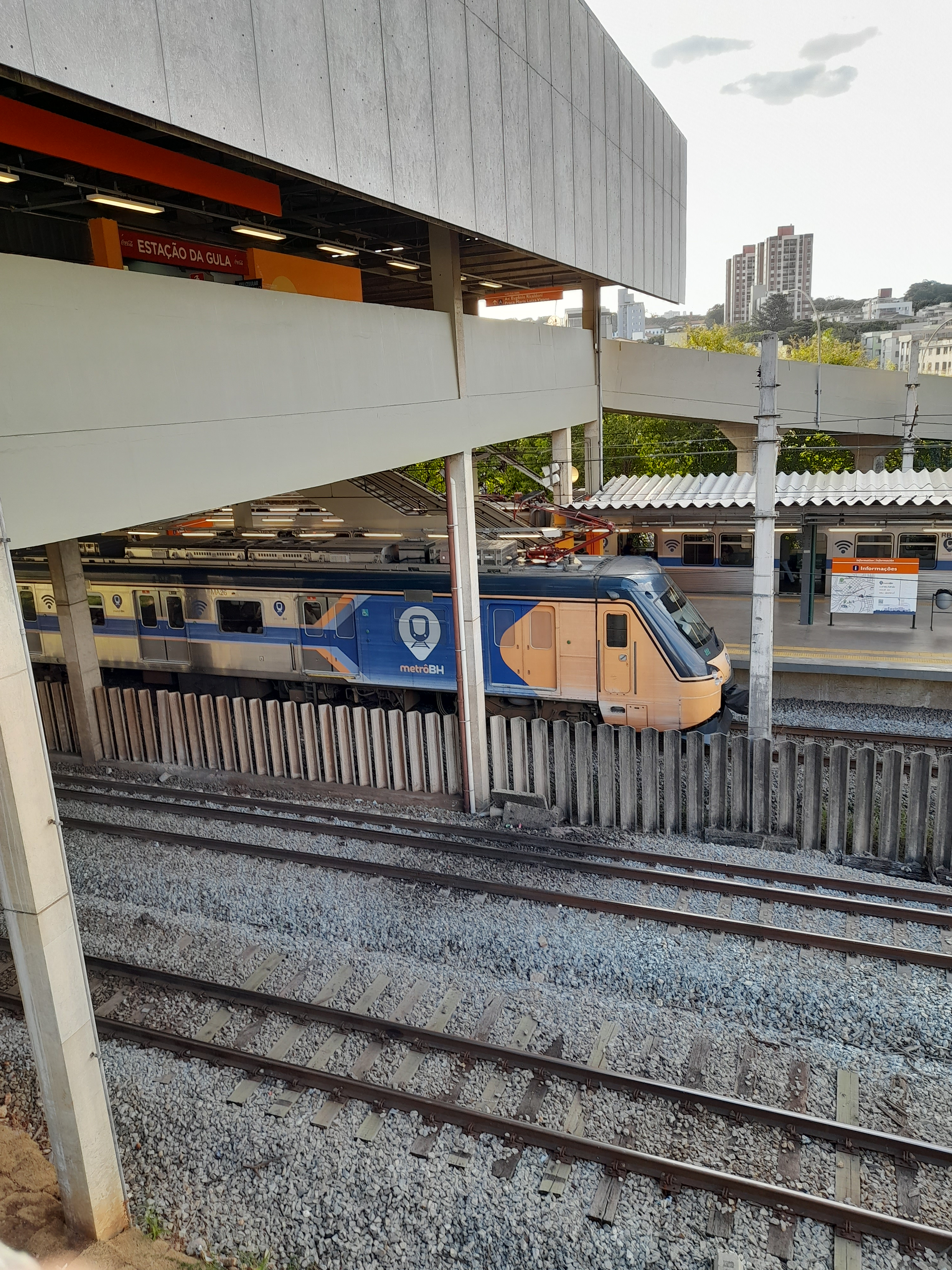
Estação Gameleira

=== Overview ===
The first section of the metro opened on 1 August 1986. At its opening, the Metro was 29.7 kilometres (18.5 mi) long and had six stations with three trains in operation. In 1987 the line was extended to Central station and two more trains were brought into use. The line was extended again several times in the mid-1990s, and finally once more in 2002 adding the last 5 of the current 19 stations.

Further trains were delivered in the 1990s, with the last being delivered in December 2001, bringing the total number of trains to 25. In 2002 that the current 20 stations of the system were completed and it was only in 2005 that operations between Eldorado and Vilarinho began to occur in full. Construction on Line 2 began in 1998, was halted in 2004 and is currently being resumed, with completion scheduled for 2027.

==== 1950-1975: Background ====
The operation of passenger transport on rails in the Belo Horizonte Metropolitan Zone dates back to 1957, when a suburban train network was implemented between Belo Horizonte Station (later reduced to Calafate Station) and Barreiro Station, in the region of the same name, giving rise to the Barreiro-Calafate line, created as a result of the intensification of urban densification in the municipality, together with the consolidation of industrial complexes located in the Cidade Industrial, in Contagem. Between 1966 and 1996, a suburban train network was established throughout Belo Horizonte and adjacent municipalities. The suburban service had 21 stations, having provided service through 4 other connections: Belo Horizonte-Rio Acima, Sabará-Caeté, Betim-Matadouro and Matadouro-Pedro Leopoldo.

==== 1975-1977: Project design ====
In 1977, the mayor of Belo Horizonte, Luiz Verano, presented a subway project to the Minister of Transportation, Dirceu Nogueira. The project was initially budgeted at US$ 300 million. The minister ordered GEIPOT, the planning agency of the Ministry of Transportation, to develop a project for the Belo Horizonte Metropolitan Region that would address the bottleneck in freight transportation capacity that was occurring in the region, eliminate level crossings in the urban area crossed by the railroad, and improve passenger rail transportation.

The Belo Horizonte Metropolitan Zone is home to one of the most important railroad junctions, connecting, without alternative, the north to the south and the east to the west of Brazil. Because freight and passenger rail transportation had to share a single line, the tracks at this junction had limited transportation capacity, lower than the existing demands. In view of these problems, GEIPOT developed a project that sought a joint solution for freight and passengers, duplicating and segregating the lines and discarding the previous idea, which was to build a railway ring around the Belo Horizonte Metropolitan Zone, which would be unfeasible to implement. The urban passenger transport system on rails was designed along the same lines as the existing railway bed, thus reducing the implementation cost and solving the problem of railway crossings in the metropolitan zone. Freight was maintained on its original bed, but with an exclusive line and some sections were rectified.

The project was developed with the following basic objectives: Implement an urban transport system on rails with subway characteristics that would serve the population in the area of direct and indirect influence of the existing RFFSA lines; improve the operational conditions of the freight lines that cross the Metropolitan Region, eliminating level crossings and expanding the transport capacity from 5 million tons/year to 30 million in the first phase and to 60 million tons/year with the duplication of the line; rationalize and modernize the urban transportation system of the Belo Horizonte Metropolitan Zone, providing greater fluidity to road traffic, reconstitution of the road network divided at grade by railways, fuel savings and reduction of noise and air pollution rates.

The original project initially envisaged a connection between Betim, to the west, and Matadouro, North East of Belo Horizonte, with a branch line to Barreiro, to the southwest, totaling 57.5 km of railway platform in a completely sealed lane, lower and upper crossings for vehicles and pedestrians. 22 stations, 25 electric train units, workshops, yards, intermodal integration terminals, support facilities, in addition to energy, supervision, control and telecommunications systems were planned.

==== 1978–1980: Funding ====
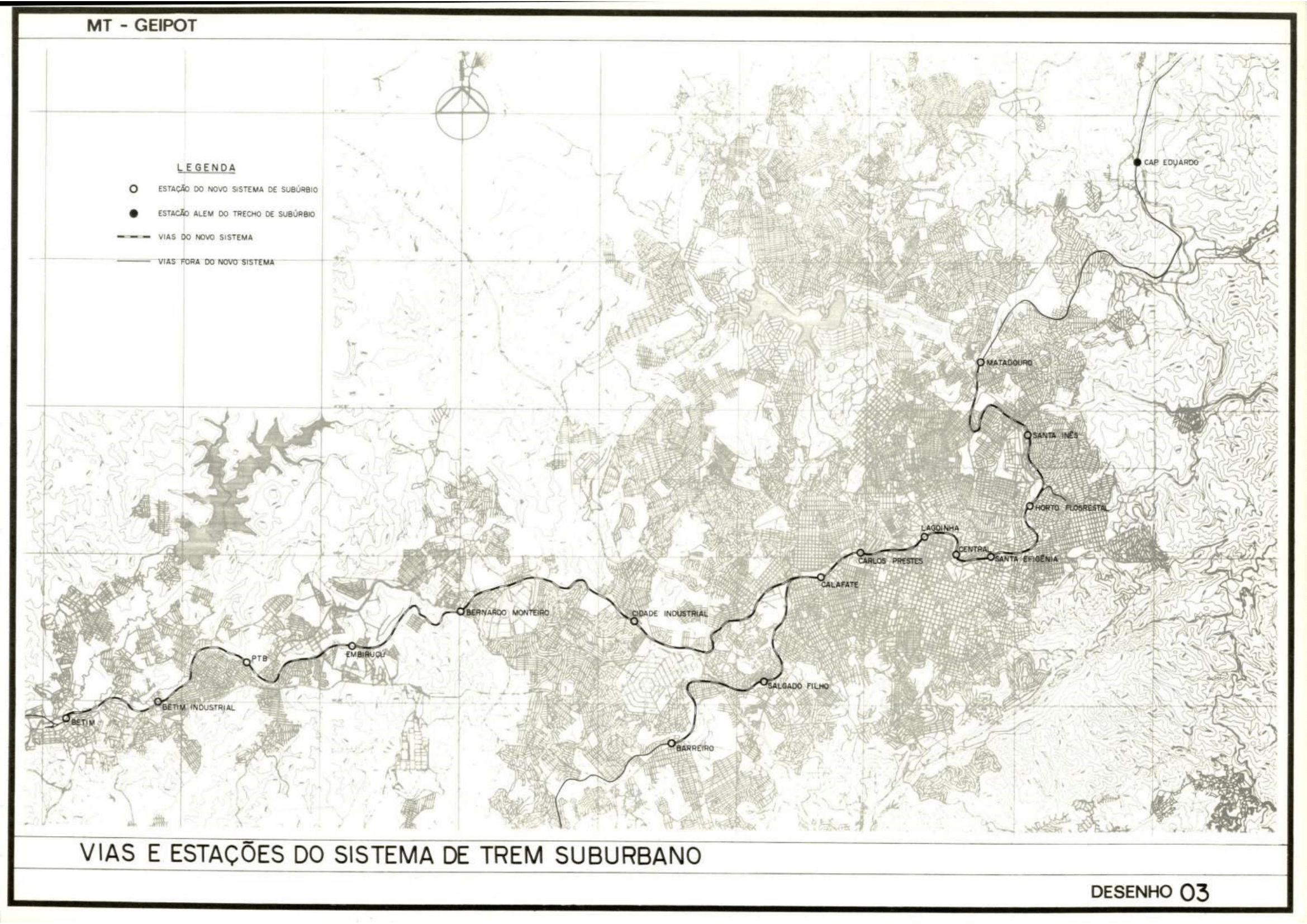
Base network for the implementation of the Belo Horizonte Metro in 1980

While the project was being developed, the Ministry of Transport sought external financing for the project. Unsuccessful meetings were held with the Inter-American Development Bank (IDB) in late 1977. The first contacts with French government agencies were made by the Ministry of Transport in August 1978. A loan of 180 million dollars from British banks was raised in London by the Empresa Brasileira de Transportes Urbanos (EBTU) in August 1980, but was blocked by the Central Bank of Brazil due to the increase in risk rates (spread).

After the unsuccessful attempt to obtain a loan from British banks, the Ministry of Transport resumed negotiations with French banks. On 17 July 1981, Minister Eliseu Resende signed an agreement with a consortium of French banks (Crédit Lyonnais, Banque National de Paris, Banque Française du Commerce Extérieur and Union Européenne des Banques) for the financing of US$220 million for the Belo Horizonte Metro project. The project had a total cost of US$ 400 millions, with the Ministry of Transportation providing US$180 million of its own resources. The signing of the financing with the French banks obliged the Ministry of Transportation to acquire 100 million dollars in French equipment for the project (trains, signaling, electrical and ticketing equipment, etc.), although Minister Rezende guaranteed that French and Brazilian companies would join forces to guarantee a nationalization rate of 75% of the equipment. The loan had a maximum grace period of ten years at an interest rate of 2.5% per year and amortization scheduled for twenty-five years.

==== 1981-2005: Implementation and expansion ====
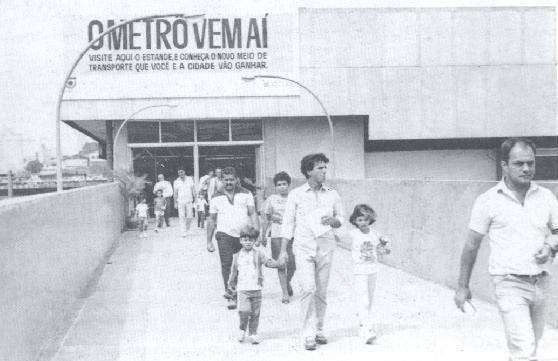
Lagoinha Station in operation shortly after its inauguration together with the system in 1986

Construction work began in June 1981, with a 1986 completion schedule for the 33.8 km stretch defined as a priority, comprising the 23.3 km double-track route between Eldorado and Matadouro, and the 10.5 km Barreiro-Calafate branch. The funds for implementing the Metro were to come from the Energy Mobilization Program (PME) and financing from the French government for the acquisition of equipment for signaling, telecommunications, and energy systems, as well as part of the rolling stock, with a counterpart from the Federal Government for the execution of civil works, infrastructure, superstructure, expropriations, and assembly of the trains. The French portion of the funds was received within the expected schedule. However, due to the closure of the PME and the lack of definition of new sources of investment, the Federal Government's resources ceased and the work schedules were successively rolled over until 1987, when the service fronts were practically demobilized, making it possible to partially operate the Eldorado-Central section, with 12.5 km in length, seven stations and a fleet of only five trains. Several complementary works to treat the surroundings of the stations remained undone, making pedestrian access to the system and integration with the bus system difficult.

Only in 1991, with cross-party support in the National Congress, was it possible to allocate resources in the federal budget and resume work on implementing the system, in addition to assembling the remaining 20 trains, whose work had been halted in 1986. With the delay in implementation and the densification of the northern vector of the metropolitan region, the objectives and projects initially planned were modified, adapting them to a new reality. The implementation of the Eldorado-Betim and Calafate-Barreiro sections was postponed. In addition, priority was given to completing the Central-São Paulo section[note 2] and extending the subway to the northern zone, towards the Venda Nova region, in view of the growth in travel characteristics and urban densification of the vector. The infrastructure of the stations, based on this planning, no longer follows the architectural standard defined by GEIPOT. The new stations are lighter, less expensive and, whenever possible, elevators are being replaced by ramps. The need to provide special treatment for pedestrian access and integration with the bus system was also identified, without which the full use of the Metro would be impossible. The new pedestrian walkways now have sides with railings, eliminating the GEIPOT standard with the fully enclosed structural guardrail. They are lighter, with smoother ramps and provide greater comfort and safety for users. Four more stations were also planned on the Eldorado-São Paulo stretch, two between Eldorado and Central (Vila Oeste and Rodoviária) and another two between Horto Florestal and São Gabriel (José Cândido da Silveira and Minas Shopping). The inclusion of these new stations is due to the reformulation of the implementation project, revitalizing the operation and planning of the system with metro characteristics, in addition to expanding service to the network's area of influence.

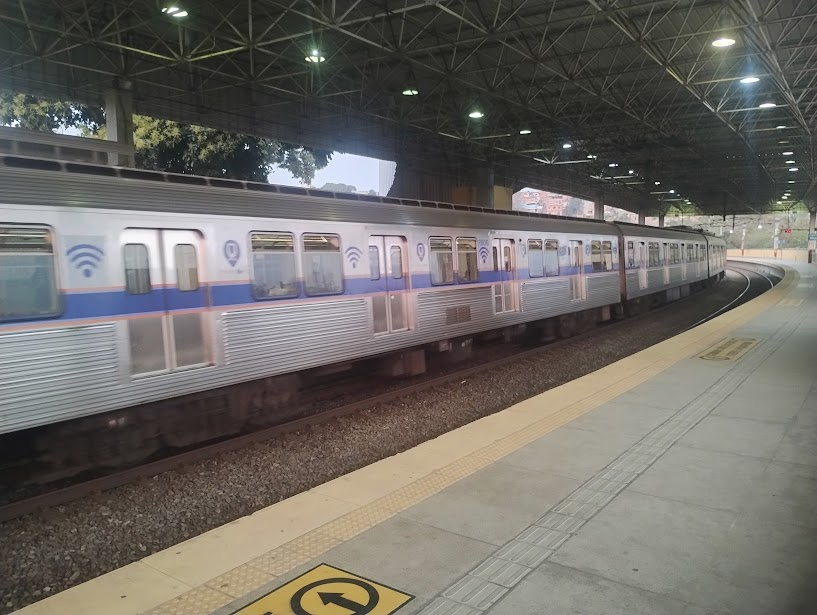
Train on Primeiro de Maio Station

The extension works to Vilarinho began in 1996, with the construction of 6.6 km and five new stations: In 1997, the Central-São Gabriel section was completed, with the delivery of the José Cândido da Silveira and Minas Shopping stations, thus concluding the two priority sections of the original plan (Eldorado-Central and Central-São Paulo). The following year, the implementation of Line 2 also began, thanks to the guarantee of resources from financing provided by the World Bank, which also supported the preparation of the Master Plan for Rail Transportation of the RMBH (PDTT), developed in a 20-year scenario. In 2002, the extension to Venda Nova was completed, with the delivery of five new stations: São Gabriel, Primeiro de Maio, Waldomiro Lobo, Floramar and Vilarinho. The section began experimental operations and was delivered on a commercial basis in 2005. Work on Line 2, in turn, was halted in 2004 due to budget constraints and the suspension of functional projects to expand the system. Work on the section has not been resumed since then.

==== 2022: Regionalization and concession to the private sector ====
In 2019, the Brazilian Federal Government, the Conselho do Programa de Parcerias e Investimentos (CPPI), included the Companhia Brasileira de Trens Urbanos (CBTU) and Trensurb, the company operating the Porto Alegre subway system, in the Programa Nacional de Desestatização (PND), as a way of facilitating the concession and/or privatization process of the transportation systems operated by them. The studies for the transfer and concession of the systems under the responsibility of CBTU and Trensurb were authorized in November of the same year, through a presidential resolution. The studies were delegated to BNDES, with delivery scheduled for 2021. The Belo Horizonte system would be the first to be granted, as it was at the most advanced stage of the process. The others would be granted later.

In June 2020, the Ministry of Infrastructure signaled a resource valued at R$ 1.2 billion to finance Line 2 of the Belo Horizonte Metro. The funds would come from compensation, on the part of Ferrovia Centro-Atlântica S.A., arising from non-compliance with clauses set forth in the concession contract signed with the company, which currently operates part of the network previously operated by RFFSA, being paid in installments and with the amount transferred to BNDES, for concession modeling already provided for by the PPI. The inclusion of Line 2 in the PPI was officialized on October 20, through a proclamation act by President Jair Bolsonaro.

On 22 December 2022, the Belo Horizonte Metro was granted to the private sector, through an auction held at the São Paulo Stock Exchange. The concession consisted of one of the stages of the privatization and regionalization process of the system, initiated by the Brazilian federal government in 2019, through the Partnerships and Investment Program (PPI). The Comporte Group, operating in the road freight and passenger transportation sectors, was the winner of the auction process, in a single bid, for approximately R$ 25.7 million. The consortium will be responsible for the duties set out in the notice prepared by BNDES, which include the operation, management and maintenance of the metro-rail network for 30 years, in addition to the revitalization and expansion of the current Line 1 and the construction of Line 2, currently halted, with the contribution of R$3.8 billion, from resources from the Brazilian Federal Government, from fines paid by rail freight carriers VLI and Ferrovia Centro Atlântica due to the abandonment of concessioned railway sections that were returned, and also from the Government of the State of Minas Gerais, from compensation arising from the judicial agreement with Vale S.A. due to the socio-environmental damages caused by the collapse of the Fundão dam in Brumadinho in 2019, in addition to financial contributions from the company itself throughout the concession period.

The official transfer of the system to the new operator took place on 23 March 2023.

On 10 February 2026, the system was extended from its previous terminus at Eldorado station 1.7 kilometres (1.1 mi) west to Novo Eldorado station.

== Operations ==
=== Network ===
Line	Terminals	Inauguration	Length (km)	Stations	Length of trip (min)	Operation
1	Novo Eldorado ↔ Vilarinho	1 August 1986	28.1	19	44 minutes	Daily, from 05:15 to 23:00

The metro system is formed by line 1, beginning at Novo Eldorado station and ending at Vilarinho. The metro spans 19 stations and 28.1 kilometers. A new branch, line 2, which will connect the Barreiro to Nova Suiça stations, is under construction and should come into operation by 2027.

Line	Terminals	Inauguration	Length (km)	Stations	Length of trip (min)	Posture
2	Barreiro ↔ Nova Suiça	2027*	10,5	7	20 minutes*	Under construction
*Estimate

=== System characteristics ===
The trains are supplied by 3000 V DC overhead wires, and have a commercial speed of 40 km/h (25 mph) with a maximum speed of 80 km/h (50 mph). Track gauge is 1,600 mm (5 ft 3 in) (broad gauge).

== Future service ==
In September 2015, ten new train cars was introduced officially.

No progress was made in respect of expansion of the network until September 2020, when the Brazilian government and the Government of Minas Gerais committed R$ 2.8 billion of funding for the construction of Line 2 and total requalification of Line 1. The construction of Line 2 was officially launched on September 16, 2024.

In May 2024, Metrô BH purchased 24 new Chinese-made trains at a cost of R$1 billion.

=== Rail Transportation Master Plan proposed by CBTU ===
The Rail Transportation Master Plan for the Belo Horizonte Metropolitan Region (PDTT) was commissioned by CBTU, in partnership with the World Bank, in 1999. The project aimed to prepare a study of scenarios and technical feasibility for the expansion of the metropolitan subway network, considering the high loads existing in structural circulation corridors in the RMBH, in addition to surpassing the original project, still being implemented by the company. Through the PDTT, analyses were carried out of several scenarios for expanding the system, which culminated in the proposal, in the final document, of a new expansion proposal for the network. In the presented proposal, Line 1 would receive extensions to the cities of Betim (thus resuming the abandoned Eldorado-Betim section of the original project) and Ribeirão das Neves. Line 2, whose implementation works had been resumed in 1998, would extend along the tracks of Line 1 to Santa Tereza Station, thus creating a shared "Y" operation between Calafate and Santa Tereza, with due operational and train circulation control. Finally, a new branch line would be implemented, Line 3, between Pampulha and Savassi, underground under the bed of Antônio Carlos, Afonso Pena and Cristóvão Colombo avenues. The expansion under such conditions would increase passenger transport to up to 40 thousand passengers/hour on Line 1, in addition to a scenario of 1.2 million users/day, in the projections until 2019.

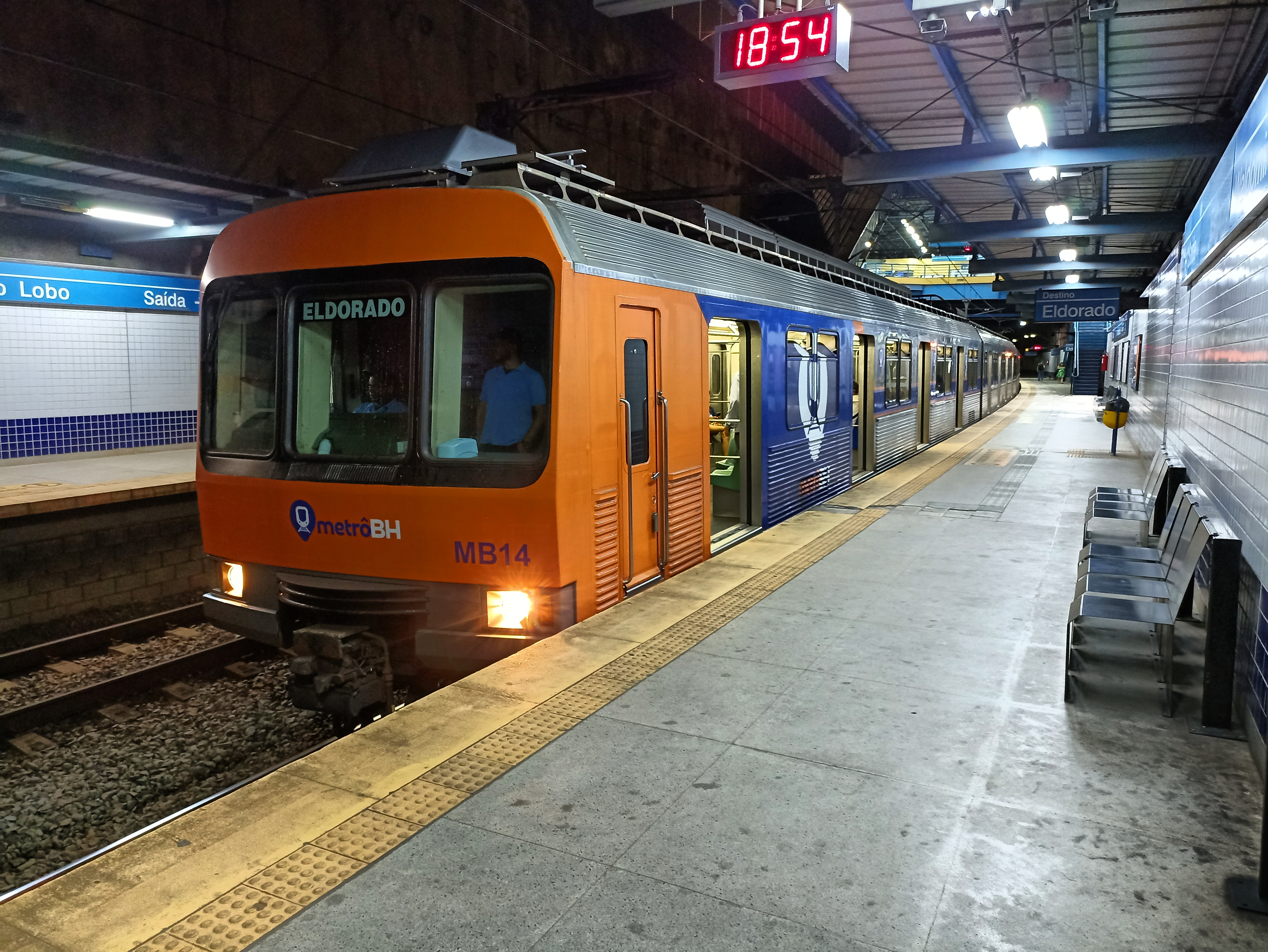
Waldomiro Lobo Station

In 2000, STU/BH conducted a demand study to analyze the feasibility of Line 2 between Barreiro and the hospital area of the Santa Efigênia neighborhood, in line with the PDTT project. The proposal presented by the superintendence considers extending the branch underground, inserting it into the central area of Belo Horizonte, without degrading and/or competing with Line 1. The scenario modeling resulted in a readjustment of the PDTT proposal for Line 2, where it will go underground under the bed of Amazonas, Afonso Pena, Carandaí and Brasil avenues, until re-emerging to the surface in Santa Tereza. The Eldorado-Betim and Vilarinho-Justinópolis sections were not included in the final proposal.

Therefore, an expansion of the metro-rail network was defined along three fundamental axes, with Line 1, between Eldorado and Vilarinho, being completely revitalized, with an increase in its operational capacity, through the reinforcement of integration with the bus systems of Belo Horizonte, Contagem and the metropolitan area; Line 2, divided into two phases, the first being above ground, from Barreiro to Nova Rodoviária station, where it would connect with Line 1, and the second phase being underground to the central area of Belo Horizonte, with Santa Tereza station as its terminus; and finally Line 3, entirely underground, between Pampulha and Savassi, following the bed of Antônio Carlos and Afonso Pena avenues. The basic and engineering projects for lines 2 and 3 were contracted by CBTU in 2004. However, they were halted due to budget cuts implemented by the federal government. In 2009, resources from supplementary credit were allocated to resume the projects, which did not occur.

Line	Terminals	Inauguration	Length (km)	Stations	Length of trip (min)	Posture
2	Barreiro ↔ Santa Tereza	-	19.5	16	-	Planned
3	Pampulha ↔ Belvedere	-	16.8	15	-	Planned

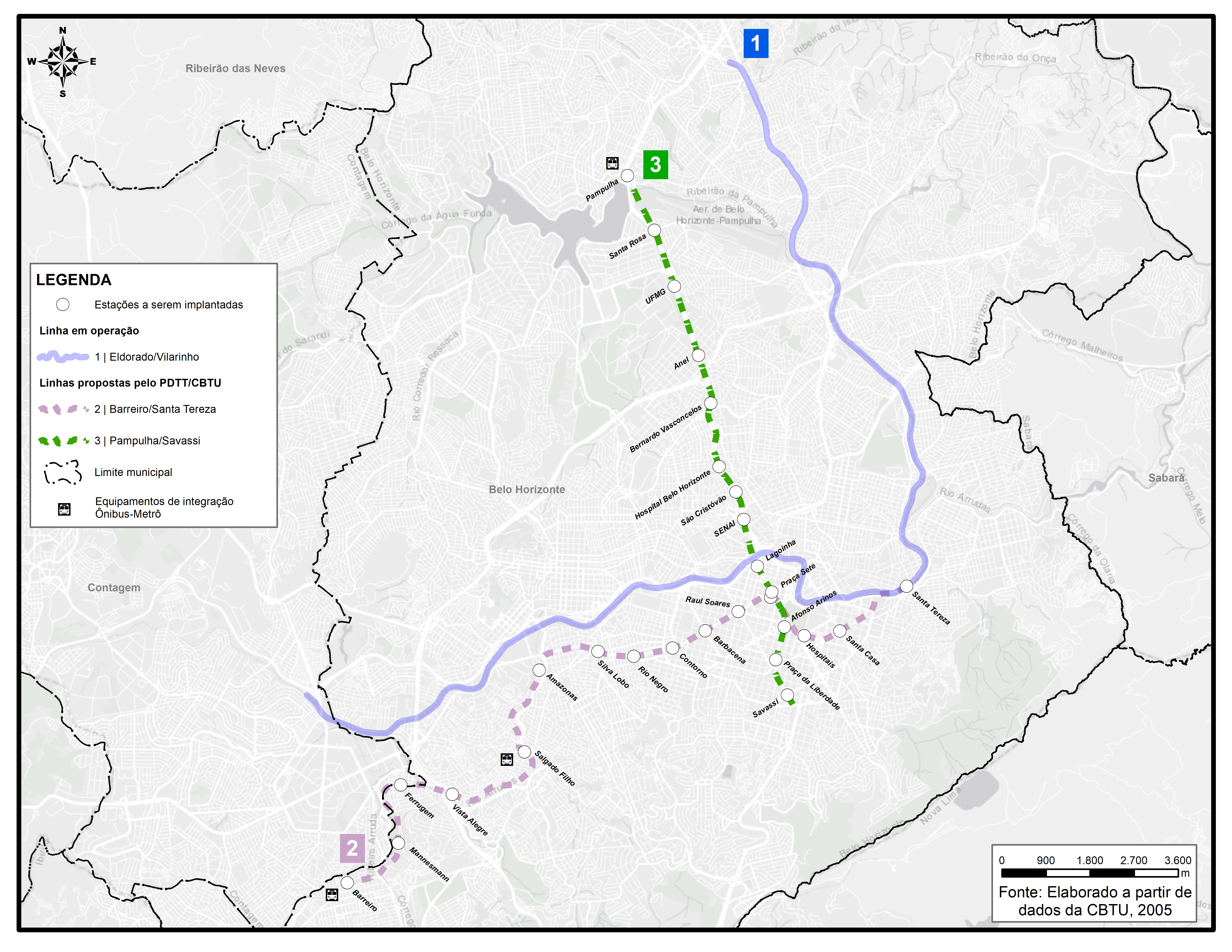
Expansion map of the RMBH metro system proposed by PDTT/CBTU, in scale

=== Planned expansion proposed by State Government ===
Law No. 8,693, of August 1993, defined the guidelines for decentralizing passenger rail transportation services to the state and municipal spheres. As a result, CBTU reinforced its process of decentralizing rail transportation systems under its responsibility, a process that had already been completed in the urban train systems of Rio de Janeiro and São Paulo. In 1995, an agreement was signed between CBTU, the Government of Minas Gerais, and the City of Belo Horizonte. This agreement allowed for the implementation of projects to expand the current Line 1 to the northern vector, of the PDTT and studies for the concession of the system, upon completion of the planned works. In this agreement, the Government of Minas Gerais and the City of Belo Horizonte committed to creating a company to which the assets and operation of the urban train system of Belo Horizonte would be transferred.

In 1997, State Law No. 12,590 was passed, authorizing the State Government to create the aforementioned company, which would be named Trem Metropolitano de Belo Horizonte S.A. (Metrominas), whose function would be to manage intercity rail transportation in the metropolitan area, considered a public function of common interest by article 43 of the Constitution of the State of Minas Gerais. In the shareholding structure of Metrominas, the State of Minas Gerais held 55% of the shares; the municipality of Belo Horizonte held 35% and 10% for the municipality of Contagem.

The company was officially established in February 2000, in a meeting between its shareholders and registration with the commercial board. Its implementation was conditioned on the transfer, by the Union, through CBTU, of all the assets of the Metropolitan Train, in addition to the completion of the works on the São Gabriel-Vilarinho and Calafate-Barreiro sections, the inventory of the assets to be regionalized and resources related to the payment of contractual budgetary expenses. The process, however, did not occur, resulting in the idleness of Metrominas and a succession of imbroglios between the state and federal authorities in the process of regionalizing the system.

In 2008, the state government commissioned a study to model a Public-Private Partnership (PPP) for the expansion and concession of the Belo Horizonte Metro. The results presented included the delivery, in a first stage, of the modernization of Line 1, the implementation of Line 2, between Barreiro and Nova Suíça and Line 3 between Savassi and Lagoinha station, in addition to the preparation of a feasibility study for the implementation of a VLT between Vilarinho station and the Administrative City of Minas Gerais. The PPP was presented to the federal government as a counterpart to the regionalization of the metropolitan system of the RMBH, with investments coming from the state and federal authorities, in addition to the private sector.

In 2011, the then President of the Republic, Dilma Rousseff, announced the release of R$3.16 billion for the expansion, renovation and modernization of the system. The resource includes the PPP modeled and presented in 2008, with interventions including the expansion of Line 1 to the Novo Eldorado neighborhood, in Contagem, in addition to the renovation and modernization of the branch line. Line 2 (Barreiro ↔ Nova Suíça) and Line 3 (Savassi ↔ Lagoinha). Between 2012 and 2013, Metrominas carried out subsoil survey studies along Line 1 and the planned routes of Lines 2 and 3, as part of the basic and engineering projects, which were completed in 2014. In the same year, Metrominas launched a public notice for the preparation of a rail transport project between Contagem and Betim, complementing the system expansion process coordinated by the company. The project delivered consisted of the implementation of a 22.5 km long metro-rail network, between the future Novo Eldorado station and the center of the municipality of Betim, divided into two implementation fronts. The first consists of extending Line 1 to the junction of Avenida João César de Oliveira with Via Expressa de Contagem, in the municipality of the same name, Beatriz neighborhood, using metro technology. From this section onwards, a VLT branch line would continue to Betim, 19.2 km long, in accordance with the demand presented in the scenarios studied. The new proposal was included as Line 4 and the executive project was scheduled for delivery in 2020. In 2022, with the concession of the system to Metrô BH company, the scope of the concession included the expansion to Novo Eldorado and the implementation of Line 2, with delivery scheduled between 2026 and 2029.

Line	Terminals	Inauguration	Length (km)	Stations	Length of trip (min)	Posture
1	Novo Eldorado ↔ Bernardo Monteiro	-	5,4	3	-	Planned
2	Nova Suíça ↔ Hospitais	-	8.5	7	-	Planned
3	Lagoinha ↔ Savassi	-	4.5	5	-	Planned
4	Beatriz ↔ Betim	-	19.2	18	-	Planned
5	São Gabriel ↔ Confins	-	18,5	10	-	Planned

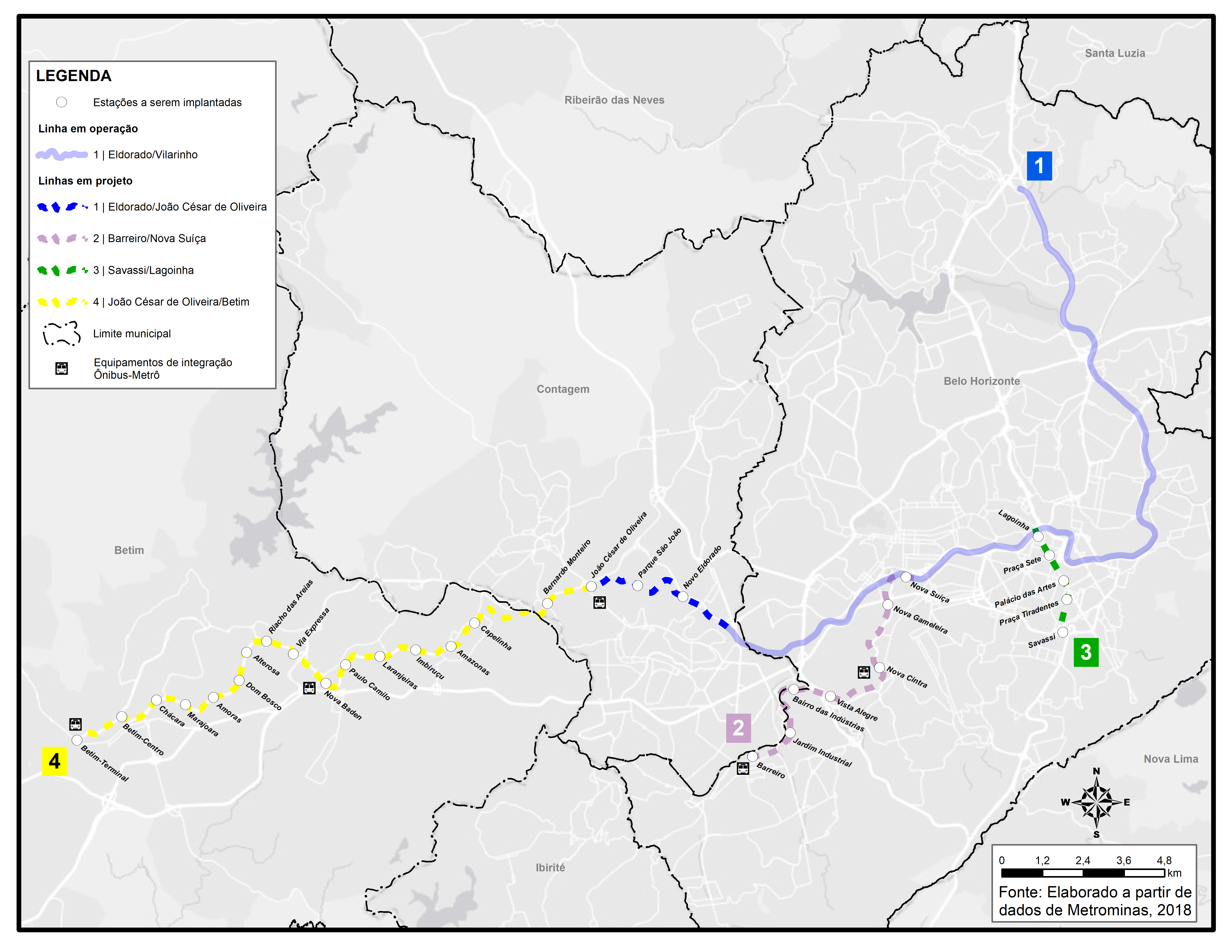
Expansion map of the RMBH metro system proposed by Metrominas, in scale

On 22 December 2022, the Belo Horizonte metro began to be managed by the Metrô BH company, through an auction held on the São Paulo Stock Exchange. The new operator will be responsible for the operation, management and maintenance of the metro rail network for 30 years, in addition to the revitalization and expansion interventions of the current Line 1 (expansion to Novo Eldorado) and the construction of Line 2 (new transfer station Nova Suiça between Calafate and Gameleira and expansion to Barreiro), with resources coming from the Brazilian Federal Government, the Government of State Minas Gerais and a fine arising from the judicial agreement with Vale S.A. due to the socio-environmental damages that occurred in the Brumadinho dam disaster in 2019 and fines paid by the freight railway operator VLI, resulting from the return of unused railway sections to the federal government, in addition to the company's own financial resources.

The transfer of the system to the winning consortium took place on March 23, 2023. The Line 1 expansion and construction of Line 2 is currently scheduled to be completed between the years 2026 and 2029.

== Network map ==
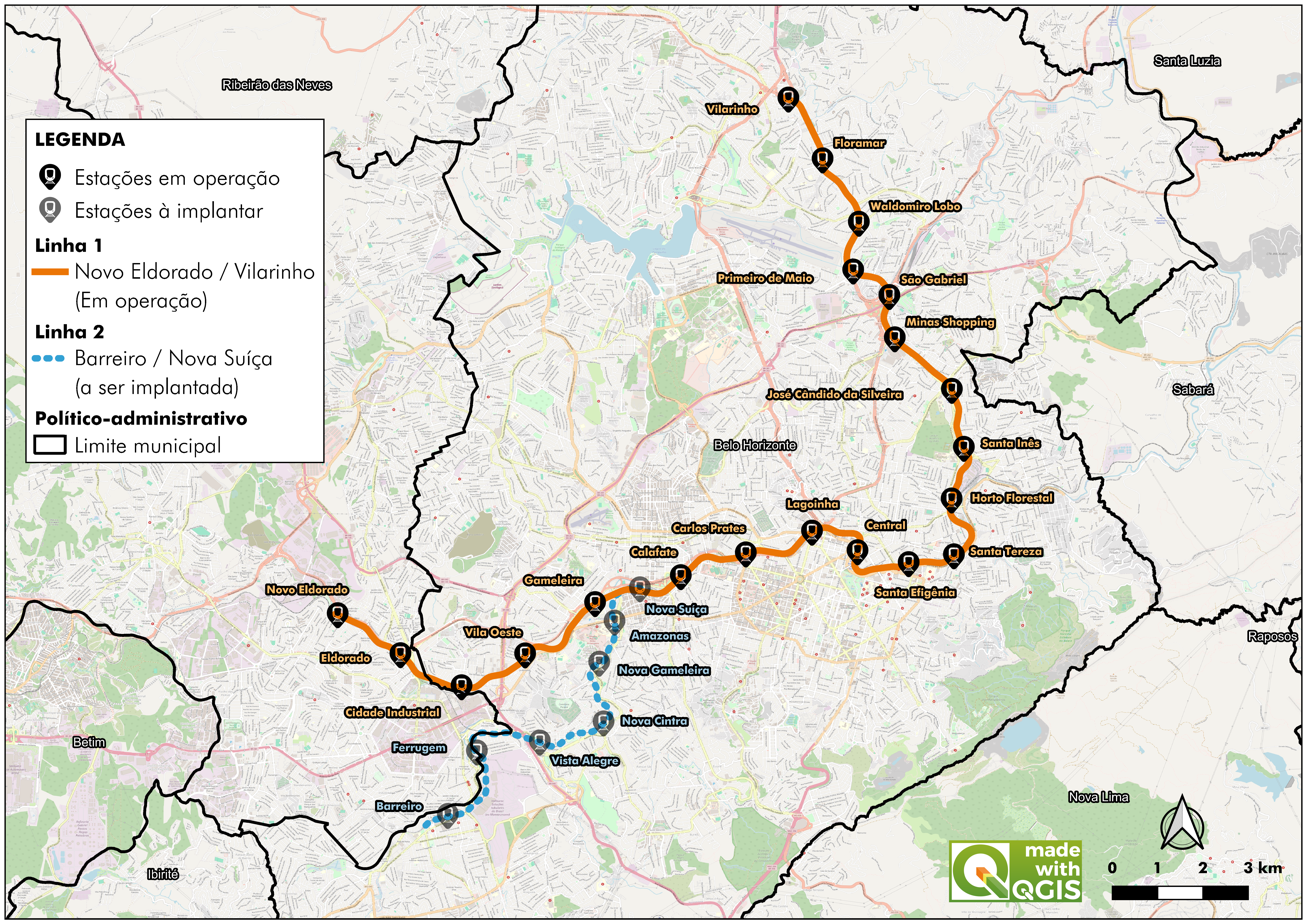

== See also ==
- List of metro systems
- Rapid transit in Brazil
