= Santa Inês station =

Belo Horizonte metro station

Santa Inês
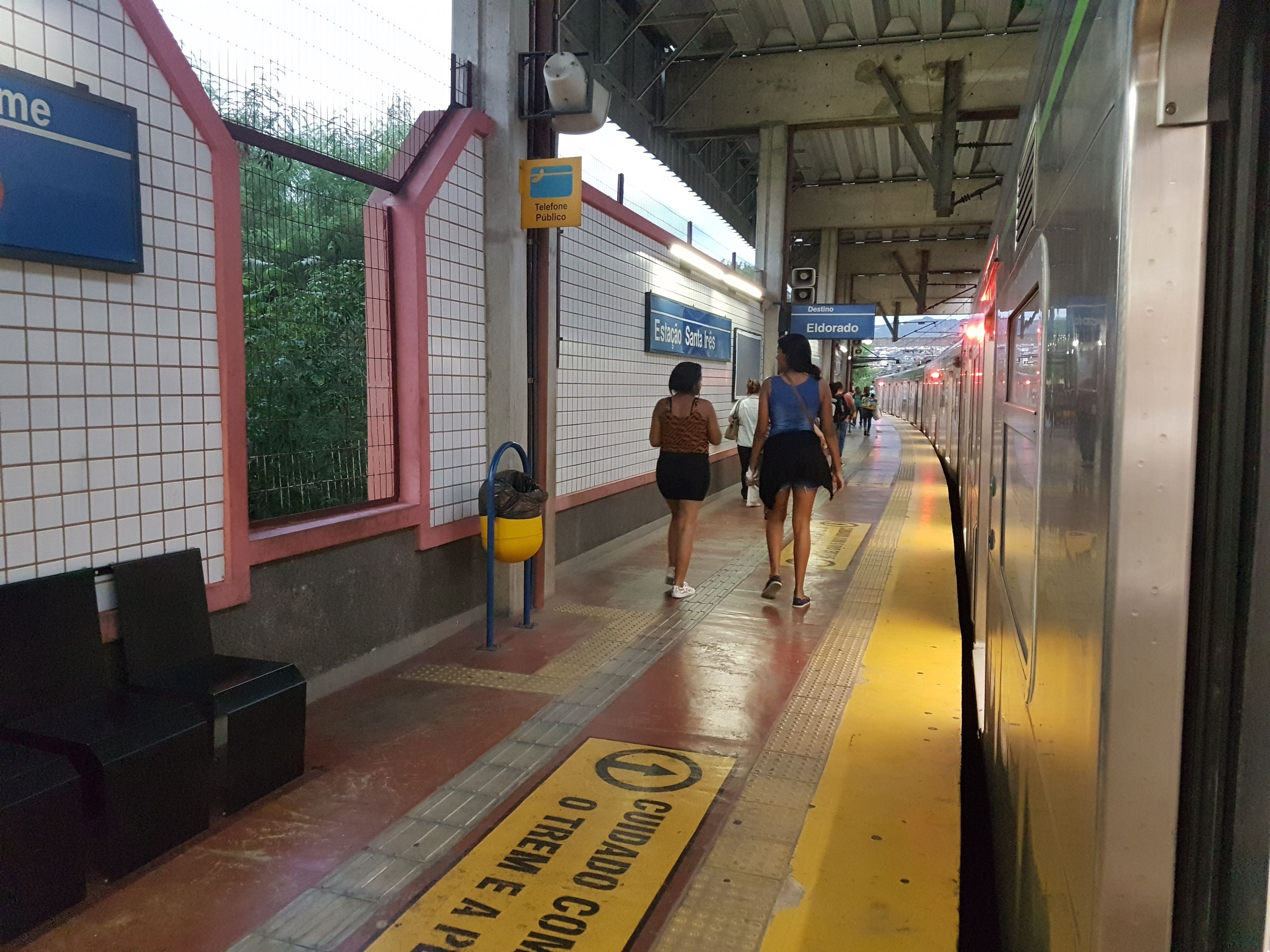
- Station Platform

General information
- Location: Brazil
- Coordinates: 19°53′43.2″S 43°54′37.8″W
- System: Belo Horizonte Metro station
- Line: Line 1

History
- Opened: December 1994

Services
Preceding station	Belo Horizonte Metro	Following station
Horto towards Novo Eldorado	Line 1	José Cândido da Silveira towards Vilarinho
Location

Santa Inês is a Belo Horizonte Metro station on Line 1. It was opened in December 1994 as a one-station extension of the line from Horto. In April 1997 the line was extended to Minas Shopping. The station is located between Horto and José Cândido da Silveira.
