= Minas Shopping station =

Belo Horizonte metro station

Minas Shopping

General information
- Location: Brazil
- Coordinates: 19°52′23.6″S 43°55′39.7″W
- System: Belo Horizonte Metro station
- Line: Line 1

History
- Opened: April 1997

Services
Preceding station	Belo Horizonte Metro	Following station
José Cândido da Silveira towards Novo Eldorado	Line 1	São Gabriel towards Vilarinho
Location

Minas Shopping is a Belo Horizonte Metro station on Line 1. It was opened in April 1997 as a terminus of the two-station extension of the line from Santa Inês. On 5 January 2002 the line was extended to São Gabriel. The station is located between José Cândido da Silveira and São Gabriel.
