= José Cândido da Silveira station =

Belo Horizonte metro station

José Cândido da Silveira
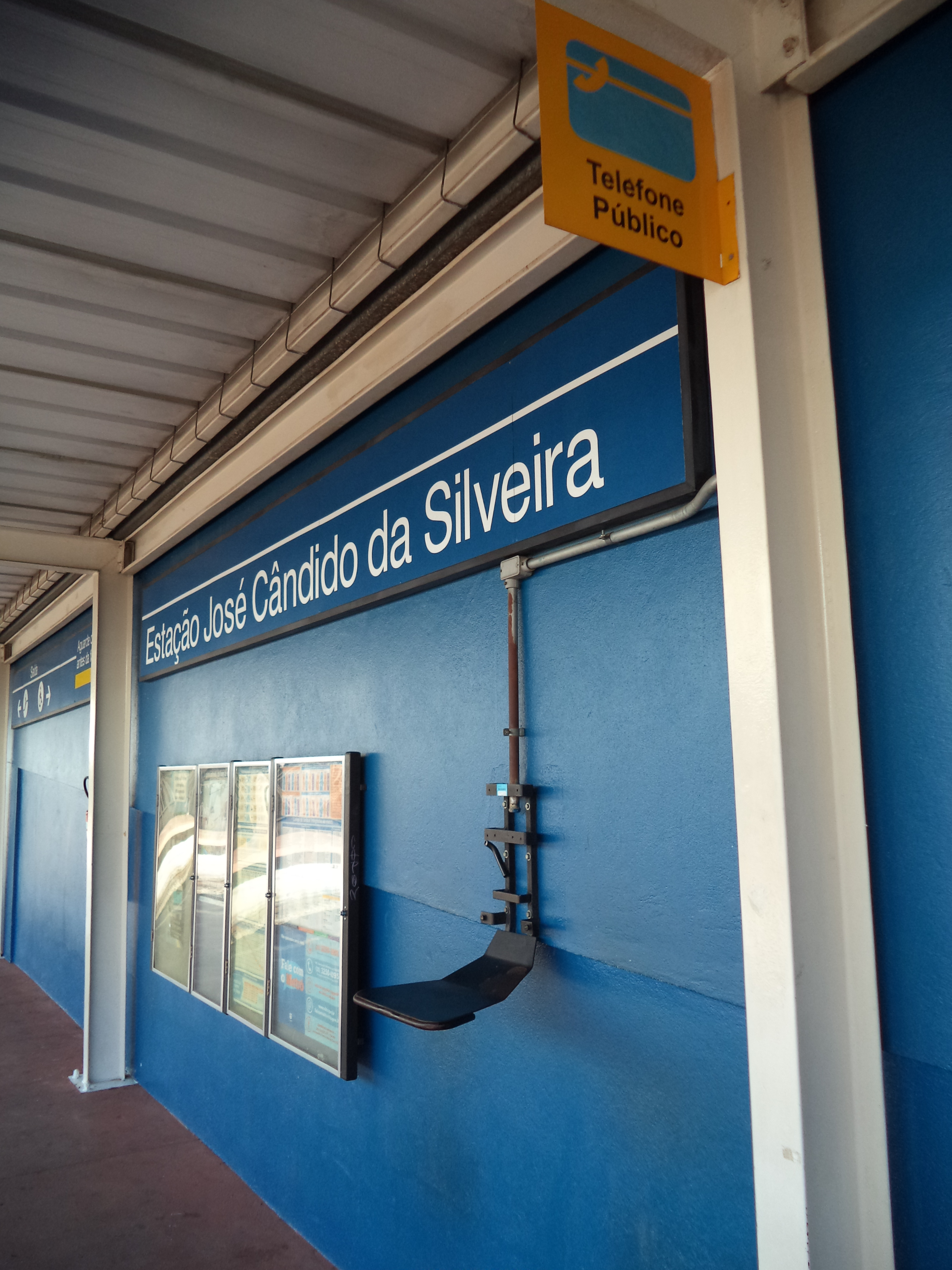
- Station Platform

General information
- Location: Brazil
- Coordinates: 19°53′01″S 43°54′46.4″W
- System: Belo Horizonte Metro station
- Line: Line 1

History
- Opened: April 1997

Services
Preceding station	Belo Horizonte Metro	Following station
Santa Inês towards Novo Eldorado	Line 1	Minas Shopping towards Vilarinho
Location

José Cândido da Silveira is a Belo Horizonte Metro station on Line 1. It was opened in April 1997 as part of a two-station extension of the line from Santa Inês to Minas Shopping. The station is located between Santa Inês and Minas Shopping.
