= The World's Billionaires 2014 =

Ranking of world billionaires by Forbes

The World's Billionaires 2014 edition was 28th annual ranking of The World's Billionaires by Forbes magazine. The list estimated the net worth of the world's richest people, excluding royalty and dictators, as of February 12, 2014. It was released online on March 3, 2014.

== Annual list ==
Bill Gates, founder of Microsoft, added $9 billion to his fortune since 2013 and topped the 2014 billionaire list. He has topped the list 15 of the previous 20 years, but was last number one in 2009. Mexican tycoon Carlos Slim came in second place after being number one the previous four years. Zara founder Amancio Ortega placed third for the second consecutive year. American investor Warren Buffett was in the top five for the 20th consecutive year, placing fourth. Oracle founder Larry Ellison rounded out the top five. America's Christy Walton was the highest ranking female, placing ninth overall. Aliko Dangote of Nigeria became the first African ever to crack the top 25, with an estimated net worth of $25 billion. 24-year-old Perenna Kei, daughter of Chinese real estate developer Ji Haipeng, was the youngest person on the list. At age 99, David Rockefeller was the oldest.

Among the largest gainers from the previous year's list was Facebook founder Mark Zuckerberg. A rapid rise in the price of Facebook stock saw his net worth soar from $13.3 billion in 2013 to $28.5 billion in 2014. WhatsApp co-founder Jan Koum saw his net worth rise from less than a billion to $6.8 billion. He debuted at #202 overall, while partner Brian Acton debuted at #551 with $3 billion.

A total of 1,645 people made the 2014 billionaire list, represented combined wealth of $6.4 trillion. Of those, a record 268 were newcomers, surpassing 2008's 226 newcomers. The list included 42 female newcomers. One hundred people listed in 2013 failed to make the list. The number of women on the list rose to a record 172 in 2014, up from 138 the previous year. However, only 12 of them were completely self-made without the help of parents or spouses. Overall, 66% of the list was self-made, 13% achieved their wealth through inheritance alone, and 21% through a mixture of the two. The combined wealth of the top 20 rose from $714.5 billion to $838.6 billion.

The United States had 492 billionaires on the list, the most of any country. The country also had the most newcomers with 50, and women with 54. China had the second most billionaires with 152, including 37 new names. Russia was third with 111. Algeria, Lithuania, Tanzania, and Uganda were all represented on the list for the first time. Sixteen of the female billionaires came from Germany, the second most of any country. Turkey saw the most people drop off the list, 19, due to high inflation in the country.

== Top 10 ==
Legend
Icon	Description
Steady	Has not changed from the previous year's list
▲	Has increased from the previous year's list
▼	Has decreased from the previous year's list

No.	Name	Net worth (USD)	Age	Nationality	Source(s) of wealth
1 ▲	Bill Gates	$76.0 billion ▲	58	United States	Microsoft
2 ▼	Carlos Slim & family	$72.0 billion ▼	74	Mexico	Telmex, América Móvil, Grupo Carso
3	Amancio Ortega	$64.0 billion ▲	77	Spain	Inditex
4	Warren Buffett	$58.2 billion ▲	83	United States	Berkshire Hathaway
5	Larry Ellison	$48.0 billion ▲	70	United States	Oracle Corporation
6	Charles Koch	$40.0 billion ▲	78	United States	Koch Industries
6	David Koch	$40.0 billion ▲	73	United States	Koch Industries
8 ▲	Sheldon Adelson	$38.0 billion ▲	80	United States	Las Vegas Sands
9 ▲	Christy Walton & family	$36.7 billion ▲	58–59	United States	Walmart
10 ▲	Jim Walton	$34.7 billion ▲	65	United States	Walmart

== Top 100 ==
No.	Name	Net Worth USD billion	Age	Nationality	Source(s) of wealth
1	Bill Gates	76.00	58	United States	Microsoft
2	Carlos Slim Helu & family	72.00	74	Mexico	telecom
3	Amancio Ortega	64.00	77	Spain	retail
4	Warren Buffett	58.20	83	United States	Berkshire Hathaway
5	Larry Ellison	48.00	69	United States	Oracle Corporation
6	Charles Koch	40.00	78	United States	diversified
6	David Koch	40.00	73	United States	diversified
8	Sheldon Adelson	38.00	80	United States	casinos
9	Christy Walton & family	36.70	59	United States	Wal-Mart
10	Jim Walton	34.70	66	United States	Wal-Mart
11	Liliane Bettencourt & family	34.50	91	France	L'Oreal
12	Stefan Persson	34.40	66	Sweden	H&M
13	Alice Walton	34.30	64	United States	Wal-Mart
14	S. Robson Walton	34.20	70	United States	Wal-Mart
15	Bernard Arnault & family	33.50	64	France	LVMH
16	Michael Bloomberg	33.00	72	United States	Bloomberg LP
17	Larry Page	32.30	40	United States	Google
18	Jeff Bezos	32.00	50	United States	Amazon
19	Sergey Brin	31.80	40	United States	Google
20	Li Ka-shing	31.00	85	Hong Kong	diversified
21	Mark Zuckerberg	28.50	29	United States	Facebook, Inc.
22	Michele Ferrero & family	26.50	88	Italy	chocolates
23	Karl Albrecht	25.00	94	Germany	retail
23	Aliko Dangote	25.00	56	Nigeria	cement, sugar, flour
25	Carl Icahn	24.50	78	United States	investments
26	George Soros	23.00	83	United States	hedge funds
27	David Thomson & family	22.60	56	Canada	Thomson Corporation
28	Lui Che Woo	22.00	84	Hong Kong	casinos
29	Dieter Schwarz	21.10	74	Germany	retail
30	Prince Al-Waleed bin Talal Alsaud	20.40	58	Saudi Arabia	investments
31	Forrest Mars, Jr.	20.00	82	United States	candy
31	Jacqueline Mars	20.00	74	United States	candy
31	John Mars	20.00	77	United States	candy
34	Jorge Paulo Lemann	19.70	74	Brazil	beer
35	Lee Shau Kee	19.60	86	Hong Kong	diversified
36	Theo Albrecht, Jr. & family	19.30	63	Germany	Aldi, Trader Joe's
36	Steve Ballmer	19.30	57	United States	Microsoft
38	Leonardo Del Vecchio	19.20	78	Italy	eyeglasses
39	Len Blavatnik	18.70	56	United States	diversified
40	Mukesh Ambani	18.60	56	India	petrochemicals, oil & gas
40	Alisher Usmanov	18.60	60	Russia	steel, telecom, investments
42	Phil Knight	18.40	76	United States	Nike
42	Michael Otto & family	18.40	70	Germany	retail, real estate
42	Masayoshi Son	18.40	56	Japan	internet, telecom
45	Tadashi Yanai & family	17.90	65	Japan	retail
46	Gina Rinehart	17.70	60	Australia	mining
47	Mikhail Fridman	17.60	49	Russia	oil, banking, telecom
48	Michael Dell	17.50	49	United States	Dell
49	Susanne Klatten	17.40	51	Germany	BMW, pharmaceuticals
50	Abigail Johnson	17.30	52	United States	money management
51	Viktor Vekselberg	17.20	56	Russia	metals, energy
52	Lakshmi Mittal	16.70	63	India	steel
53	Vladimir Lisin	16.60	57	Russia	steel, transport
54	Cheng Yu-tung	16.20	88	Hong Kong	diversified
55	Joseph Safra	16.00	75	Brazil	banking
56	Paul Allen	15.90	61	United States	Microsoft, investments
57	Leonid Mikhelson	15.60	58	Russia	gas, chemicals
58	Anne Cox Chambers	15.50	94	United States	media
58	Iris Fontbona & family	15.50	71	Chile	mining
58	Francois Pinault & family	15.50	77	France	retail
61	Mohammed Al Amoudi	15.30	67	Saudi Arabia	oil, diversified
61	Azim Premji	15.30	68	India	software
61	Gennady Timchenko	15.30	61	Russia	oil & gas
64	Wang Jianlin	15.10	59	China	real estate
65	Charles Ergen	15.00	61	United States	Dish Network
66	Stefan Quandt	14.90	47	Germany	BMW
67	German Larrea Mota Velasco & family	14.70	60	Mexico	mining
68	Harold Hamm	14.60	68	United States	oil & gas
69	Donald Bren	14.40	81	United States	real estate
69	Ray Dalio	14.40	64	United States	hedge funds
71	Georg Schaeffler	14.30	49	Germany	ball bearings
72	Luis Carlos Sarmiento	14.20	81	Colombia	banking
73	Serge Dassault & family	14.00	88	France	aviation
73	Ronald Perelman	14.00	71	United States	leveraged buyouts
73	Laurene Powell Jobs & family	14.00	50	United States	Apple, Disney
76	Vagit Alekperov	13.60	63	Russia	Lukoil
76	John Fredriksen	13.60	69	Cyprus	shipping
78	Rupert Murdoch & family	13.50	82	United States	media
78	John Paulson	13.50	58	United States	hedge funds
80	Ma Huateng	13.40	42	China	internet media
81	Gerald Cavendish Grosvenor & family	13.00	62	United Kingdom	real estate
82	Pallonji Mistry	12.80	84	Ireland	construction
82	Johanna Quandt	12.80	87	Germany	BMW
82	Dilip Shanghvi	12.80	58	India	pharmaceuticals
82	Jack Taylor & family	12.80	91	United States	Enterprise Rent-A-Car
86	Thomas & Raymond Kwok & family	12.60	n/a	Hong Kong	real estate
86	Vladimir Potanin	12.60	53	Russia	metals
88	Rinat Akhmetov	12.50	47	Ukraine	steel, coal
88	James Simons	12.50	75	United States	hedge funds
90	Alberto Bailleres Gonzalez & family	12.40	82	Mexico	mining
91	Robin Li	12.10	45	China	internet search
92	Ernesto Bertarelli & family	12.00	48	Switzerland	biotech, investments
92	Hans Rausing	12.00	87	Sweden	packaging
94	Zong Qinghou	11.60	68	China	beverages
95	Robert Kuok	11.50	90	Malaysia	diversified
95	David & Simon Reuben	11.50	71	United Kingdom	investments, real estate
97	Dhanin Chearavanont & family	11.40	74	Thailand	food
97	Andrey Melnichenko	11.40	41	Russia	coal, fertilizers
97	Henry Sy & family	11.40	89	Philippines	diversified
100	German Khan	11.30	52	Russia	oil, banking, telecom
100	Ananda Krishnan	11.30	75	Malaysia	telecom

== See also ==
- The World's Billionaires 2013
- The World's Billionaires 2015
