= Sandra Ortega Mera =

Spanish billionaire heiress (born 1968)

Sandra Ortega
- Born: Sandra Ortega Mera; 19 July 1968 (age 57); A Coruña, Galicia, Spain
- Education: University of Santiago de Compostela
- Known for: Heiress of Inditex Group; Spain's richest woman
- Spouse: Pablo Gómez
- Children: 3
- Parents: Amancio Ortega Gaona; Rosalía Mera
- Family: Ortega family

Sandra Ortega Mera (born 19 July 1968) is a Spanish billionaire heiress, businesswoman and socialite.

Mera is the daughter of Amancio Ortega Gaona, and his first wife Rosalia Mera, the founders of Inditex, best known as the parent company of global fashion empire Zara. She is the second-richest person in Spain, after her father. As of September 2024, Forbes estimated her net worth at US$12.0 billion.

== Career and personal life ==
Mera inherited a 7% stake in Inditex, from her mother Rosalía, after she died in 2013, as her brother Marcos was born with cerebral palsy, and became Spain's richest woman.

Mera owns a share of pharmaceutical company PharmaMar.

Ortega spends time working with the foundation her mother founded for those with mental and physical disabilities, Fundación Paideia Galiza.

Ortega earned a degree in psychology from the University of Santiago de Compostela. She is married with three children and resides in A Coruña, Spain.
