= The World's Billionaires 2015 =

Ranking of world billionaires by Forbes

The World's Billionaires 2015 edition was the 29th annual ranking of The World's Billionaires by Forbes magazine. The list estimated the net worth of the world's richest people. The new list was released online on March 2, 2015. As of 2015, Bill Gates had been placed at the top of this list 16 times.

== Annual list ==
Bill Gates was again named the richest person in the world in Forbes Magazine's annual list of the world's billionaires. This is the 16th time that the founder of Microsoft has claimed the top spot. Carlos Slim, Mexican business magnate, came in second as he had in 2014. Warren Buffett of Berkshire Hathaway placed third while the founder of Zara, Amancio Ortega of Spain, slipped down a position from last year to number four. Larry Ellison, the founder of Oracle rounded off the top five. Christy Walton was the highest ranking female at number eight. America's Evan Spiegel, co-founder of photo messaging app Snapchat, became the youngest billionaire this year at the age of 24. At age 99, David Rockefeller maintained his position as the oldest billionaire to make the list.

In the 29th annual list of global billionaires, ist.cord 1,826 billionaires were named with an aggregated net worth of $7.05 trillion, up from $6.4 trillion in 2014. 46 of the billionaires on the list are under the age of 40. A record number of 290 people joined the list for the first time, of whom 25% hail from China, which produced a world-leading 71 newcomers. The United States came in second, with 57, followed by India, with 28, and Germany, with 23. Mark Zuckerberg, the social media magnate and founder of Facebook, was placed at number 16 with $33.4 billion. Self-made billionaires made up the largest number of people on the list with 1,191 positions while just 230 came into their wealth through inheritance. The number of billionaires who inherited a portion but are still working to increase their fortunes is 405.

The United States has the largest number of billionaires. The number of Russian billionaires declined the most; being down to 76 billionaires from 111 of 2014. Russia is now placed behind China, Germany and India. Iceland again has a billionaire in the list after a gap of five years with the entry of Björgólfur Thor Björgólfsson. Guatemala has a billionaire, Mario Lopez Estrada, for the first time in history.

Monarchs and other royalty are not included in the list.

== Wealth rankings ==
Legend
| Icon | Description |
|---|---|
| Steady | Has not changed from the previous year's list |
| ▲ | Has increased from the previous year's list |
| ▼ | Has decreased from the previous year's list |

| No. | name | Net worth (USD) | Age | Citizenship | Source(s) of wealth | Image |
|---|---|---|---|---|---|---|
| 1 | Bill Gates | $79.2 billion ▲ | 60 | United States | Microsoft | |
| 2 | Carlos Slim | $77.1 billion ▲ | 75 | Mexico | Telmex | |
| 3 ▲ | Warren Buffett | $72.7 billion ▲ | 84 | United States | Berkshire Hathaway | |
| 4 ▼ | Amancio Ortega | $64.5 billion ▲ | 78 | Spain | Inditex Group | |
| 5 | Larry Ellison | $54.3 billion ▲ | 70 | United States | Oracle Corporation | |
| 6 | Charles Koch | $42.9 billion ▲ | 79 | United States | Koch Industries | |
| 6 | David Koch | $42.9 billion ▲ | 74 | United States | Koch Industries | |
| 8 ▲ | Christy Walton | $41.7 billion ▲ | 60 | United States | Wal-Mart | |
| 9 ▲ | Jim Walton | $40.6 billion ▲ | 66 | United States | Wal-Mart | |
| 10 ▲ | Liliane Bettencourt | $40.1 billion ▲ | 92 | France | L'Oreal | |

== Top 100 ==
| No. | Name | Citizenship | Age | Net Worth USD billion | Source(s) of wealth |
|---|---|---|---|---|---|
| 1 | Bill Gates | United States | 59 | 79.20 | Microsoft |
| 2 | Carlos Slim Helu | Mexico | 75 | 77.10 | Telecom |
| 3 | Warren Buffett | United States | 84 | 72.70 | Berkshire Hathaway |
| 4 | Amancio Ortega | Spain | 78 | 64.50 | Zara |
| 5 | Larry Ellison | United States | 70 | 54.30 | Oracle |
| 6 | Charles Koch | United States | 79 | 42.90 | Diversified |
| 6 | David Koch | United States | 74 | 42.90 | Diversified |
| 8 | Christy Walton | United States | 60 | 41.70 | Wal-Mart |
| 9 | Jim Walton | United States | 67 | 40.60 | Wal-Mart |
| 10 | Liliane Bettencourt | France | 92 | 40.10 | L'Oréal |
| 11 | Alice Walton | United States | 65 | 39.40 | Wal-Mart |
| 12 | S. Robson Walton | United States | 71 | 39.10 | Wal-Mart |
| 13 | Bernard Arnault | France | 66 | 37.20 | LVMH |
| 14 | Michael Bloomberg | United States | 73 | 35.50 | Bloomberg LP |
| 15 | Jeff Bezos | United States | 51 | 34.80 | Amazon.com |
| 16 | Mark Zuckerberg | United States | 30 | 33.40 | Facebook |
| 17 | Li Ka-shing | Hong Kong | 86 | 33.30 | Diversified |
| 18 | Sheldon Adelson | United States | 81 | 31.40 | Casinos |
| 19 | Larry Page | United States | 41 | 29.70 | Google |
| 20 | Sergey Brin | United States | 41 | 29.20 | Google |
| 21 | Georg Schaeffler | Germany | 50 | 26.90 | Ball bearings |
| 22 | Forrest Mars, Jr. | United States | 83 | 26.60 | Food |
| 22 | Jacqueline Mars | United States | 75 | 26.60 | Food |
| 22 | John Franklyn Mars | United States | 78 | 26.60 | Food |
| 25 | David Thomson | Canada | 57 | 25.50 | Media |
| 26 | Jorge Paulo Lemann | Brazil | 75 | 25.00 | Beer |
| 27 | Lee Shau Kee | Hong Kong | 87 | 24.80 | Real estate |
| 28 | Stefan Persson | Sweden | 67 | 24.50 | H&M |
| 29 | George Soros | United States | 84 | 24.20 | Hedge funds |
| 29 | Wang Jianlin | China | 60 | 24.20 | Real Estate |
| 31 | Carl Icahn | United States | 79 | 23.50 | Investments |
| 32 | Maria Franca Fissolo | Italy | 97 | 23.40 | Nutella, chocolates |
| 33 | Jack Ma | China | 50 | 22.70 | E-commerce |
| 34 | Prince Alwaleed Bin Talal Alsaud | Saudi Arabia | 59 | 22.60 | Investments |
| 35 | Steve Ballmer | United States | 58 | 21.50 | Microsoft |
| 35 | Phil Knight | United States | 77 | 21.50 | Nike |
| 37 | Beate Heister & Karl Albrecht Jr. | Germany | n/a | 21.30 | Supermarkets |
| 38 | Li Hejun | China | 47 | 21.10 | Solar power equipment |
| 39 | Mukesh Ambani | India | 57 | 21.00 | Petrochemicals, oil & gas |
| 40 | Leonardo Del Vecchio | Italy | 79 | 20.40 | Eyeglasses |
| 41 | Len Blavatnik | United States | 57 | 20.20 | Diversified |
| 41 | Tadashi Yanai | Japan | 66 | 20.20 | Retail |
| 43 | Charles Ergen | United States | 62 | 20.10 | Dish Network |
| 44 | Dilip Shanghvi | India | 59 | 20.00 | Pharmaceuticals |
| 45 | Laurene Powell Jobs | United States | 51 | 19.50 | Apple, Disney |
| 46 | Dieter Schwarz | Germany | 75 | 19.40 | Retail |
| 47 | Michael Dell | United States | 50 | 19.20 | Dell |
| 48 | Azim Premji | India | 69 | 19.10 | Software |
| 49 | Theo Albrecht, Jr. | Germany | 64 | 19.00 | Aldi, Trader Joe's |
| 50 | Michael Otto | Germany | 71 | 18.10 | Retail, real estate |
| 51 | Paul Allen | United States | 62 | 17.50 | Microsoft, investments |
| 52 | Joseph Safra | Brazil | 76 | 17.30 | Banking |
| 53 | Anne Cox Chambers | United States | 95 | 17.00 | Media |
| 54 | Susanne Klatten | Germany | 52 | 16.80 | BMW, pharmaceuticals |
| 55 | Pallonji Mistry | Ireland | 85 | 16.30 | Construction |
| 56 | Ma Huateng | China | 43 | 16.10 | Internet media |
| 57 | Patrick Drahi | France | 51 | 16.00 | Telecom |
| 58 | Thomas & Raymond Kwok | Hong Kong | n/a | 15.90 | Real estate |
| 59 | Stefan Quandt | Germany | 48 | 15.60 | BMW |
| 60 | Ray Dalio | United States | 65 | 15.40 | Hedge funds |
| 60 | Vladimir Potanin | Russia | 54 | 15.40 | Metals |
| 62 | Serge Dassault | France | 89 | 15.30 | Aviation |
| 62 | Robin Li | China | 46 | 15.30 | Internet search |
| 64 | Donald Bren | United States | 82 | 15.20 | Real estate |
| 65 | Francois Pinault | France | 78 | 14.90 | Retail |
| 66 | Shiv Nadar | India | 69 | 14.80 | Information technology |
| 67 | Aliko Dangote | Nigeria | 57 | 14.70 | Cement, sugar, flour |
| 68 | Mikhail Fridman | Russia | 50 | 14.60 | Oil, banking, telecom |
| 69 | Hinduja brothers | United Kingdom | n/a | 14.50 | Diversified |
| 69 | Ronald Perelman | United States | 72 | 14.50 | Leveraged buyouts |
| 71 | Cheng Yu-tung | Hong Kong | 89 | 14.40 | Diversified |
| 71 | Alisher Usmanov | Russia | 61 | 14.40 | Steel & mining, telecom, investments |
| 73 | Henry Sy | Philippines | 90 | 14.20 | Diversified |
| 73 | Viktor Vekselberg | Russia | 57 | 14.20 | Metals, energy |
| 75 | Masayoshi Son | Japan | 57 | 14.10 | Internet, telecom |
| 76 | James Simons | United States | 76 | 14.00 | Hedge funds |
| 77 | German Larrea Mota Velasco | Mexico | 61 | 13.90 | Mining |
| 77 | Rupert Murdoch | United States | 83 | 13.90 | Media |
| 77 | Johanna Quandt | Germany | 88 | 13.90 | BMW |
| 80 | David & Simon Reuben | United Kingdom | 72 | 13.70 | Investments, real estate |
| 81 | Dhanin Chearavanont | Thailand | 75 | 13.60 | Food |
| 82 | Iris Fontbona | Chile | 72 | 13.50 | Mining |
| 82 | Lui Che Woo | Hong Kong | 85 | 13.50 | Casinos |
| 82 | Lakshmi Mittal | India | 64 | 13.50 | Steel |
| 85 | Abigail Johnson | United States | 53 | 13.40 | Money management |
| 85 | Luis Carlos Sarmiento | Colombia | 82 | 13.40 | Banking |
| 87 | Lei Jun | China | 45 | 13.20 | Smartphones |
| 87 | Charoen Sirivadhanabhakdi | Thailand | 70 | 13.20 | Beverages |
| 89 | Alexey Mordashov | Russia | 49 | 13.00 | Steel, investments |
| 89 | Marcel Herrmann Telles | Brazil | 65 | 13.00 | Beer |
| 91 | Gerald Cavendish Grosvenor | United Kingdom | 63 | 12.60 | Real estate |
| 92 | Hans Rausing | Sweden | 88 | 12.50 | Packaging |
| 92 | Jack Taylor | United States | 92 | 12.50 | Enterprise Rent-A-Car |
| 94 | Charles Butt | United States | 77 | 12.30 | Supermarkets |
| 94 | Gina Rinehart | Australia | 61 | 12.30 | Mining |
| 96 | Vagit Alekperov | Russia | 64 | 12.20 | Lukoil |
| 96 | Harold Hamm | United States | 69 | 12.20 | Oil & gas |
| 96 | Patrick Soon-Shiong | United States | 63 | 12.20 | Pharmaceuticals |
| 99 | Stefano Pessina | Italy | 73 | 12.10 | Drugstores |
| 100 | Richard Kinder | United States | 70 | 12.00 | Pipelines |
| 100 | Elon Musk | United States | 43 | 12.00 | Tesla Motors |
| 100 | Stephen Schwarzman | United States | 68 | 12.00 | Investments |

== See also ==
- List of wealthiest families
- The World's Billionaires 2014
