= Marta Ortega Pérez =

Spanish businesswoman (born 1984)

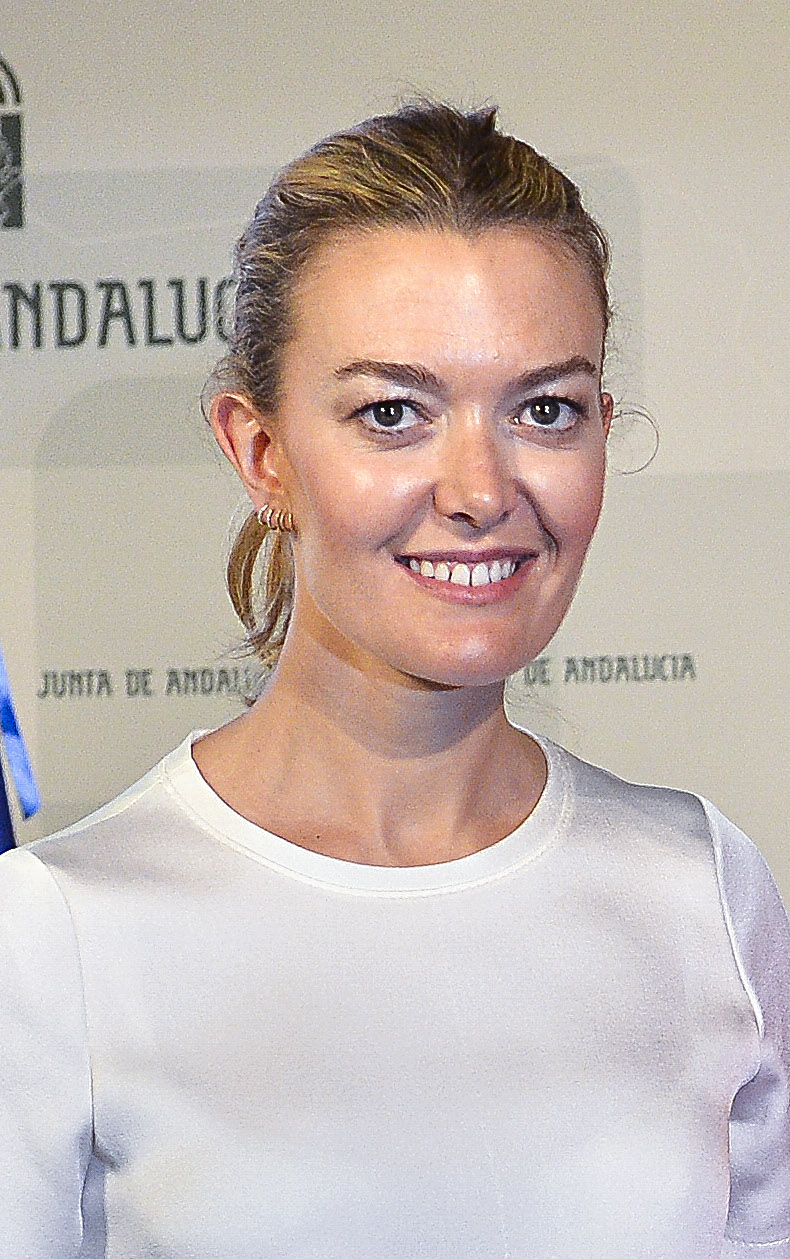
- Ortega in 2016
- Born: 10 January 1984 (age 42); Vigo, Galicia, Spain
- Education: European Business School London
- Occupation: Businesswoman
- Title: Chair, Inditex
- Term: 2022–present
- Predecessor: Pablo Isla
- Spouses: Sergio Álvarez Moya (m. 2012; div. 2015) Carlos Torretta (m. 2018)
- Children: 2
- Father: Amancio Ortega
- Family: Ortega family

Marta Ortega Pérez (born 10 January 1984) is a Spanish businesswoman who is the daughter of Amancio Ortega and was appointed chair of Inditex as of December 2021. Ortega replaced Pablo Isla, who was chair and CEO of Inditex since 2011, in April 2022.

== Early life and education ==
Ortega was born on 10 January 1984 in Vigo, Spain. She is the only daughter of Flora Pérez, the second wife of Amancio, who was still married to Rosalía Mera, his Zara co-founder, at the time.

Ortega studied at A Coruña and continued her baccalaureate education at Aiglon College in Switzerland. She studied business at the European Business School in London and graduated in 2007, with a specialty in international entrepreneurship.

== Career ==
In 2007, Ortega began to work at Inditex, at the London Zara store in Chelsea, then other locations and departments in the business. She currently works at the Inditex headquarters in Arteixo, Spain, for the women's product and design department, collaborating with Beatriz Padín.

In Arteixo, Ortega works with her father, Inditex founder Amancio Ortega, introducing new ways to communicate with the public. Since 2015, she has been on the board of directors of the Amancio Ortega Foundation. The foundation's scholarship program was modified due to the COVID-19 pandemic per an agreement with the Massachusetts Institute of Technology (MIT).

In November 2021, it was announced that in April 2022 Ortega Pérez would be named chairperson of Inditex, succeeding Pablo Isla. Her appointment caused the company's share price to fall sharply. Since 2022, she has been receiving an annual remuneration for her work as a non-executive chair and head of an internal audit body. In her role, she will be expected to address the company's reputation of alleged forced labor and environmental impact.

In addition to her roles at Inditex and Zara, Ortega Pérez has been a board member at Amancio Ortega's single-family office Pontegadea Inversiones since 2022 and another family-owned investment vehice, Partler Participaciones.

Ortega Pérez was ranked 32nd on Fortune's list of Most Powerful Women in 2023.

== Other activities ==
Ortega Pérez operates the Centro Hípico Casas Novas, a horse riding school in A Coruña that, among other things, offers therapy for children with disabilities.

In 2022, Ortega Pérez established the MOP Foundation, an non-profit arts organization housed a former cement silo in A Coruña’s port. The foundation has since shown exhibitions of photographers Peter Lindbergh, Paolo Roversi, Annie Leibovitz, David Bailey, Irving Penn, Helmut Newton, and David Sims.

== Personal life ==
Ortega has three children, two sons and a daughter. She married Sergio Álvarez Moya in 2012, with whom she had her son Amancio, but separated three years later. In 2018 she was married to Carlos Torretta, a former model agent who has since become a public relations employee at Inditex, with whom she has a daughter born in 2020. For her wedding to Torretta, she wore a Valentino gown.
