= Ortega family =

Wealthy Spanish family

The Ortega family is a Spanish dynastic family that is the fifth wealthiest family in the world. The majority of the family's wealth comes from the clothing company Inditex and its flagship store Zara. As of August 2025, the family has an estimated net worth of $120 billion. The head of the family, billionaire Amancio Ortega, is the ninth richest person in the world and the second richest person from Europe behind Bernard Arnault.

== Family ==
- Amancio Ortega (born 1936), billionaire businessman, chairman of Inditex, and co-founder of Zara, sixth richest person in the world and formerly the richest
- Rosalía Mera (1944–2013), former billionaire businesswoman and entrepreneur, co-founder of Zara, ex-wife of Amancio Ortega, formerly world's richest self-made woman
  - Sandra Ortega Mera (born 1968), daughter of Amancio Ortega and Rosalía Mera, billionaire businesswoman and Spain's richest woman Married with Pablo Gómez
    - Martiño Gómez Ortega
    - Antía Gómez Ortega
    - Uxía Gómez Ortega
  - Marcos Ortega Mera (born 1971), son of Amancio Ortega and Rosalía Mera, has cerebral palsy
- Flora Pérez Marcote (born 1952), current wife of Amancio Ortega (m. 2001)
  - Marta Ortega Pérez (born 1984), daughter of Amancio (chair of Inditex) Ortega and Flora Pérez, billionaire, divorced by Sergio Álvarez Moya, remarried to Carlos Torretta Echeverría
    - Amancio Álvarez Ortega
    - Matilda Torretta Ortega

=== By net worth ===
Rank no	Name	Net worth	Ref
1	Amancio Ortega	$130.1 billion (2024)	
2	Sandra Ortega Mera	$11.3 billion (2024)	
3	Rosalía Mera (deceased)	$6.1 billion (2013)	
