= The World's Billionaires 2013 =

Ranking of world billionaires by Forbes

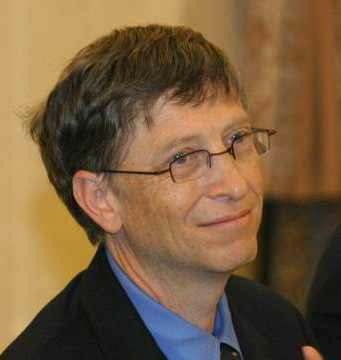
Bill Gates, the billionaire ranked second

The World's Billionaires 2013 edition was 27th annual ranking of The World's Billionaires by Forbes magazine. The list estimated the net worth of the world's richest people, excluding royalty and dictators, as of February 14, 2013. It was released online on March 3, 2013 and published in the March 25 print edition of Forbes.

== Annual list ==
Mexico's Carlos Slim topped the 2013 billionaire list, marking his fourth consecutive year at the top. Microsoft founder Bill Gates remained in second, while Zara founder Amancio Ortega moved up to third. Oretega's gain of $19.5 billion was the largest of anyone on the list. American investor Warren Buffett failed to make the top three for the first time since 2000, placing fourth. Oracle founder Larry Ellison rounded out the top five. Diesel founder Renzo Rosso was among the top newcomers, debuting with an estimate net worth of $3 billion.

A global rise in asset prices, led Forbes editor Randall Lane to declare "It [was] a very good year to be a billionaire". However, it was not a good year to be Mark Zuckerberg. The founder of Facebook saw his fortune fall by $4 billion to $13.3 billion, but he wasn't the biggest loser. That was Brazil's Eike Batista who fell from seventh to 100th. Overall, net gainers outnumbered net losers by 4:1.

A record total of 1,426 people made the 2013 list, representing $5.4 trillion of assets. Of those, 442 billionaires hailed from the United States. The Asian-Pacific region had 386 billionaires and Europe 366. The list also featured a record number of newcomers, 210, representing 42 different countries. The United States had the most newcomers with 27. Sixty people from the 2012 list fell below a billion dollar of assets in 2013 and eight others from the 2012 list died. The Asia-Pacific region had the most drop offs, with 29, followed by the United States with 16. The 2013 list featured 138 women, of which 50 came from the United States.

A majority of the list (961 individuals, 67%) was entirely self-made; 184 (13%) inherited their wealth, and 281 (20%) achieved their fortune through a combination of inheritance and business acumen. Two billionaires – Sulaiman Al Rajhi and Roman Avdeev - tied for the most children with 23. Both of their fortunes are tied to the banking industry, Al-Rajhi Bank and Credit Bank of Moscow respectively.

== Top 10 ==
Legend
Icon	Description
Steady	Has not changed from the previous year's list
▲	Has increased from the previous year's list
▼	Has decreased from the previous year's list

No.	Name	Net worth (USD)	Age	Citizenship	Source(s) of wealth
1	Carlos Slim & family	$73.0 billion ▲	73	Mexico	Telmex, América Móvil, Grupo Carso
2	Bill Gates	$67.0 billion ▲	57	United States	Microsoft
3 ▲	Amancio Ortega	$57.0 billion ▲	76	Spain	Inditex Group
4 ▼	Warren Buffett	$53.5 billion ▲	82	United States	Berkshire Hathaway
5 ▲	Larry Ellison	$43.0 billion ▲	68	United States	Oracle Corporation
6 ▲	Charles Koch	$34.0 billion ▲	77	United States	Koch Industries
6 ▲	David Koch	$34.0 billion ▲	72	United States	Koch Industries
8 ▲	Li Ka-shing	$31.0 billion ▲	84	Hong Kong/Canada	Cheung Kong Holdings
9 ▲	Liliane Bettencourt & family	$30.0 billion ▲	90	France	L'Oréal
10 ▼	Bernard Arnault	$29.0 billion ▼	63	France	LVMH Moët Hennessy • Louis Vuitton

== Top 100 ==
No.	Name	Net Worth USD billion	Age	Country	Source(s) of wealth
1	Carlos Slim Helu & family	73,0	73	Mexico	telecom
2	Bill Gates	67,0	57	United States	Microsoft
3	Amancio Ortega	57,0	76	Spain	Zara
4	Warren Buffett	53.5	82	United States	Berkshire Hathaway
5	Larry Ellison	43,0	68	United States	Oracle
6	Charles Koch	34,0	77	United States	diversified
6	David Koch	34,0	72	United States	diversified
8	Li Ka-shing	31,0	84	Hong Kong	diversified
9	Liliane Bettencourt & family	30,0	90	France	L'Oréal
10	Bernard Arnault & family	29,0	64	France	LVMH
11	Christy Walton & family	28.2	58	United States	Wal-Mart
12	Stefan Persson	28,0	65	Sweden	H&M
13	Michael Bloomberg	27,0	71	United States	Bloomberg LP
14	Jim Walton	26.7	65	United States	Wal-Mart
15	Sheldon Adelson	26.5	79	United States	casinos
16	Alice Walton	26.3	63	United States	Wal-Mart
17	S. Robson Walton	26.1	69	United States	Wal-Mart
18	Karl Albrecht	26,0	93	Germany	Aldi
19	Jeff Bezos	25.2	49	United States	Amazon.com
20	Larry Page	23,0	39	United States	Google
21	Sergey Brin	22.8	39	United States	Google
21	Mukesh Ambani	21.5	55	India	Reliance Industries
23	Michele Ferrero & family	20.4	87	Italy	chocolates
24	Lee Shau Kee	20.3	85	Hong Kong	diversified
24	David Thomson & family	20.3	55	Canada	media
26	Prince Alwaleed Bin Talal Alsaud	20,0	58	Saudi Arabia	investments
26	Carl Icahn	20,0	77	United States	leveraged buyouts
26	Thomas & Raymond Kwok & family	20,0	-	Hong Kong	real estate
29	Dieter Schwarz	19.5	73	Germany	retail
30	George Soros	19.2	82	United States	hedge funds
31	Theo Albrecht, Jr. & family	18.9	62	Germany	Aldi, Trader Joe's
32	Alberto Bailleres Gonzalez & family	18.2	81	Mexico	mining
33	Jorge Paulo Lemann	17.8	73	Brazil	beer
34	Alisher Usmanov	17.6	59	Russia	steel, telecom, investments
35	Iris Fontbona & family	17.4	70	Chile	mining
36	Forrest Mars, Jr.	17,0	81	United States	candy
36	Jacqueline Mars	17,0	73	United States	candy
36	John Mars	17,0	76	United States	candy
36	Georgina Rinehart	17,0	59	Australia	mining
40	German Larrea Mota Velasco & family	16.7	59	Mexico	mining
41	Mikhail Fridman	16.5	48	Russia	oil, banking, telecom
41	Lakshmi Mittal	16.5	62	India	steel
43	Aliko Dangote	16.1	55	Nigeria	cement, sugar, flour
44	Len Blavatnik	16,0	55	United States	diversified
44	Cheng Yu-tung	16,0	87	Hong Kong	diversified
46	Joseph Safra	15.9	74	Brazil	banking
47	Rinat Akhmetov	15.4	46	Ukraine	steel, coal
47	Leonid Mikhelson	15.4	57	Russia	gas, chemicals
49	Leonardo Del Vecchio	15.3	77	Italy	eyeglasses
49	Michael Dell	15.3	48	United States	Dell
51	Steve Ballmer	15.2	56	United States	Microsoft
52	Viktor Vekselberg	15.1	55	Russia	oil, metals
53	Paul Allen	15,0	60	United States	Microsoft, investments
53	Francois Pinault & family	15,0	76	France	retail
55	Vagit Alekperov	14.8	62	Russia	Lukoil
56	Phil Knight	14.4	75	United States	Nike
56	Andrey Melnichenko	14.4	41	Russia	coal, fertilizers
58	Dhanin Chearavanont & family	14.3	73	Thailand	food
58	Susanne Klatten	14.3	50	Germany	BMW, pharmaceuticals
58	Vladimir Potanin	14.3	52	Russia	metals
61	Michael Otto & family	14.2	69	Germany	retail, real estate
62	Vladimir Lisin	14.1	56	Russia	steel, transport
62	Gennady Timchenko	14.1	60	Russia	oil & gas
64	Luis Carlos Sarmiento	13.9	80	Colombia	banking
65	Mohammed Al Amoudi	13.5	68	Saudi Arabia	oil, diversified
66	Tadashi Yanai & family	13.3	64	Japan	retail
66	Mark Zuckerberg	13.3	28	United States	Facebook
68	Henry Sy & family	13.2	88	Philippines	diversified
69	Donald Bren	13,0	80	United States	real estate
69	Serge Dassault & family	13,0	87	France	aviation
69	Lee Kun-Hee	13,0	71	South Korea	Samsung
69	Mikhail Prokhorov	13,0	47	Russia	investments
73	Alexey Mordashov	12.8	47	Russia	steel, investments
74	Antonio Ermirio de Moraes & family	12.7	84	Brazil	diversified
74	Abigail Johnson	12.7	51	United States	money management
76	Ray Dalio	12.5	63	United States	hedge funds
76	Robert Kuok	12.5	89	Malaysia	diversified
78	Miuccia Prada	12.4	63	Italy	Prada
79	Ronald Perelman	12.2	70	United States	leveraged buyouts
80	Anne Cox Chambers	12,0	93	United States	media
81	Stefan Quandt	11.9	46	Germany	BMW
82	Ananda Krishnan	11.7	74	Malaysia	telecoms
82	Alejandro Santo Domingo Davila	11.7	36	Colombia	beer
82	James Simons	11.7	74	United States	hedge funds
82	Charoen Sirivadhanabhakdi	11.7	68	Thailand	drinks
86	Zong Qinghou	11.6	67	China	beverages
87	Dirce Navarro De Camargo & family	11.5	-	Brazil	construction
87	John Fredriksen	11.5	68	Cyprus	shipping
89	Gerald Cavendish Grosvenor & family	11.4	61	United Kingdom	real estate
90	Harold Hamm	11.3	67	United States	oil & gas
91	Rupert Murdoch	11.2	81	United States	News Corp
91	John Paulson	11.2	57	United States	hedge funds
91	Azim Premji	11.2	67	India	software
94	Ernesto Bertarelli & family	11,0	47	Switzerland	biotech, investments
94	Charlene de Carvalho-Heineken	11,0	58	Netherlands	Heineken
94	Hans Rausing	11,0	86	Sweden	packaging
94	Jack Taylor & family	11,0	90	United States	Enterprise Rent-A-Car
98	Lui Che Woo	10.7	83	Hong Kong	gaming
98	Laurene Powell Jobs & family	10.7	49	United States	Apple, Disney
100	Eike Batista	10.6	56	Brazil	mining, oil
100	Charles Ergen	10.6	60	United States	EchoStar
100	Johanna Quandt	10.6	86	Germany	BMW

== See also ==
- List of wealthiest families
