= Amancio Ortega Foundation =

Spanish non-profit organization

The Amancio Ortega Foundation is a non-profit organization created in 2001 by Amancio Ortega and based in the province of A Coruña, in Arteixo. Its activities include a scholarship program for 400 students to study for a year in Canada and the United States.

== History ==
The Amancio Ortega Foundation was established in 2001, on the initiative of Spanish businessman Amancio Ortega in Arteixo. The mission defined in its general objectives is to promote actions that facilitate equal opportunities for citizens. To this end, the foundation develops transversal actions in different areas, combining collaborations or donations to social institutions of recognized trajectory such as Caritas or the Spanish public health system, together with a scholarship program that has facilitated studies in Canada and the United States to 500 students in the course of 2016.

The foundation's vision is structured within the framework of the Sustainable Development Goals (SDGs), especially the SDGs for the fight against poverty and hunger, the SDGs for the promotion of health, well-being, education, innovation and alliances between social actors. Thus, its bylaws state as its founding purpose: "The purpose of the Amancio Ortega Foundation is to promote, foster, develop, execute and finance activities that contribute to the dissemination and extension of education, social and welfare action, as well as training and learning that contribute to the advancement of the fundamental aspects of an integral society".

The foundation's board of trustees, chaired since its creation in 2001 by Amancio Ortega, is made up of Flora Pérez Marcote, José Arnau Sierra, Marta Ortega Pérez, Pablo Isla Álvarez de Tejera, Roberto Cibeira Moreiras and Antonio Abril Abadín.

== Activities ==
The activities of the Amancio Ortega Foundation are focused on education, with branches extended to the field of social support. The educational program provided scholarships annually, since 2015 for 500 students to pursue their high school studies in the United States and Canada. In March 2020, due to the COVID-19 pandemic, the 600 scholarship students were repatriated from Toronto and Dallas to Spain. Faced with restrictions on travel to North America, the 600 scholarship students for the following academic year, 2020–2021, began an online training course with the Massachusetts Institute of Technology (MIT) in October 2020.

In 2019, the foundation signed an agreement with the Regional Government of Galicia to finance the construction of homes for the elderly with the aim of expanding 900 places in the Galician community and creating jobs.

== Ongoing projects ==
The Amancio Ortega Foundation has different projects underway in the social, health and educational fields.

- Program to accompany and reduce unwanted loneliness in people over 65: In April 2023, the Amancio Ortega Foundation and the Red Cross reached an agreement to implement a program to reduce unwanted loneliness, social isolation and the "digital divide" suffered by people over 65.
- Collaboration agreement with FESBAL to renew its distribution infrastructure: In April 2023, the Amancio Ortega Foundation and the Spanish Federation of Food Banks (FESBAL) reached an agreement to consolidate the infrastructure of the social entity.
- Housing assistance program in collaboration with Cáritas: In April 2023, the Amancio Ortega Foundation and Cáritas reached an agreement to improve the situation of some 15,000 people throughout Spain with difficulties in accessing housing.
- Comprehensive Care Centers for the Elderly: On 13 September 2019 the Amancio Ortega Foundation signed an agreement with the Regional Government of Galicia for the implementation of seven public residential centers, in the seven main Galician cities: La Coruña, Ferrol, Lugo, Orense, Pontevedra, Santiago de Compostela and Vigo.
- Comprehensive pediatric palliative care center: In March 2023, the Amancio Ortega Foundation and the Porque Viven Foundation presented the project for the first comprehensive pediatric palliative care center in Spain.
- Program for the implementation of proton therapy in Spain's public health system: In October 2021, the Amancio Ortega Foundation agreed with the Government of Spain and several autonomous communities on a donation of 280 million euros to install ten proton accelerators in the public health system.
- Program to support public oncology: since 2015, the Amancio Ortega Foundation has been developing a program to support the renewal of technological equipment in public hospitals, specifically in the area of diagnosis and radiotherapy treatment of cancer.
- Scholarship Program: Since 2010, the Amancio Ortega Foundation has been offering scholarships to students from schools in Galicia to study 1st year of High School in the United States.
- Master's Degree in Journalistic and Audiovisual Production: In 2017, in collaboration with the Santiago Rey-Fernández Latorre Foundation and backed by the University of La Coruña, the Amancio Ortega Foundation launched the master's degree in Journalistic and Audiovisual Production (MPXA).

=== Acknowledgements ===
2017 philanthropic initiative in the AEF Awards of the Spanish Association of Foundations (AEF).
