= Hospital de Emergencias Enfermera Isabel Zendal =

Hospital in Madrid, Spain

- Madrid Health Service
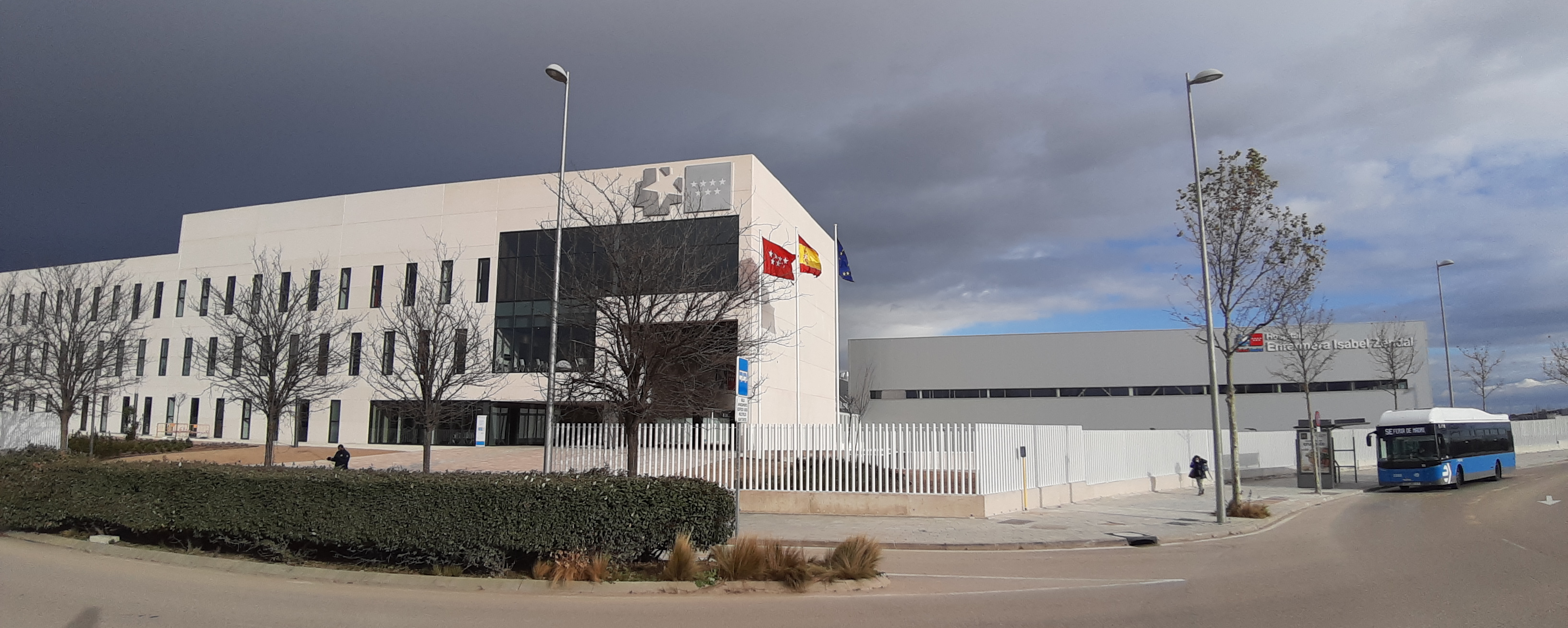

Geography
- Location: Avenida Manuel Fraga Iribarne 2, 28055 Madrid, Spain
- Coordinates: 40°29′1″N 3°36′23″W

Organisation
- Type: Specialist

Services
- Emergency department: Yes
- Beds: 1,056
- Speciality: COVID-19

History
- Constructed: 2020
- Opened: 1 December 2020

Links
- Lists: Hospitals in Spain

The Hospital de Emergencias Enfermera Isabel Zendal is a public hospital constructed during the COVID-19 pandemic in the Hortaleza district of Madrid, Spain. Having opened its doors in December 2020 after a construction period of only 100 days, it became the city's main recipient of patients infected by the virus and the Spanish hospital with most COVID-patients by January 2021. It is named after Isabel Zendal, a Spanish nurse notable for participating in the 1803–06 Balmis Expedition which brought smallpox vaccination to South America and Asia.

== Uses and specialization ==
The building has a sectorable design to allow for adaptation of its facilities after the COVID-19 pandemic. This includes 1,008 beds and 48 intensive care units, all equipped with "advanced medical technologies". The hospital has modern communication and security systems, which include biometric recognition for both patients and staff and automatic doors. Another notable feature is the centro logístico, a warehouse with a surface area of 8,000 square metres (86,000 ft^{2}) which will house the central repository of the Madrid Health Service.

== Criticism ==
While construction works were completed on schedule, the original budget had to be doubled, with the building ultimately costing "around 100 million Euros". Government officials justified this increase by pointing to the use of allegedly more advanced technologies. Mónica García of opposition party Más Madrid compared the building to Castellón–Costa Azahar Airport, an oft-cited example for wasteful spending. Local union representatives have criticized a general lack of qualified personnel, fearing that the new hospital may purge doctors and nurses from elsewhere. The opening ceremony of the hospital, attended by Isabel Díaz Ayuso, the President of the Community of Madrid, was accompanied by protests.
