= Francisco Javier de Balmis =

Spanish physician (1753–1819)

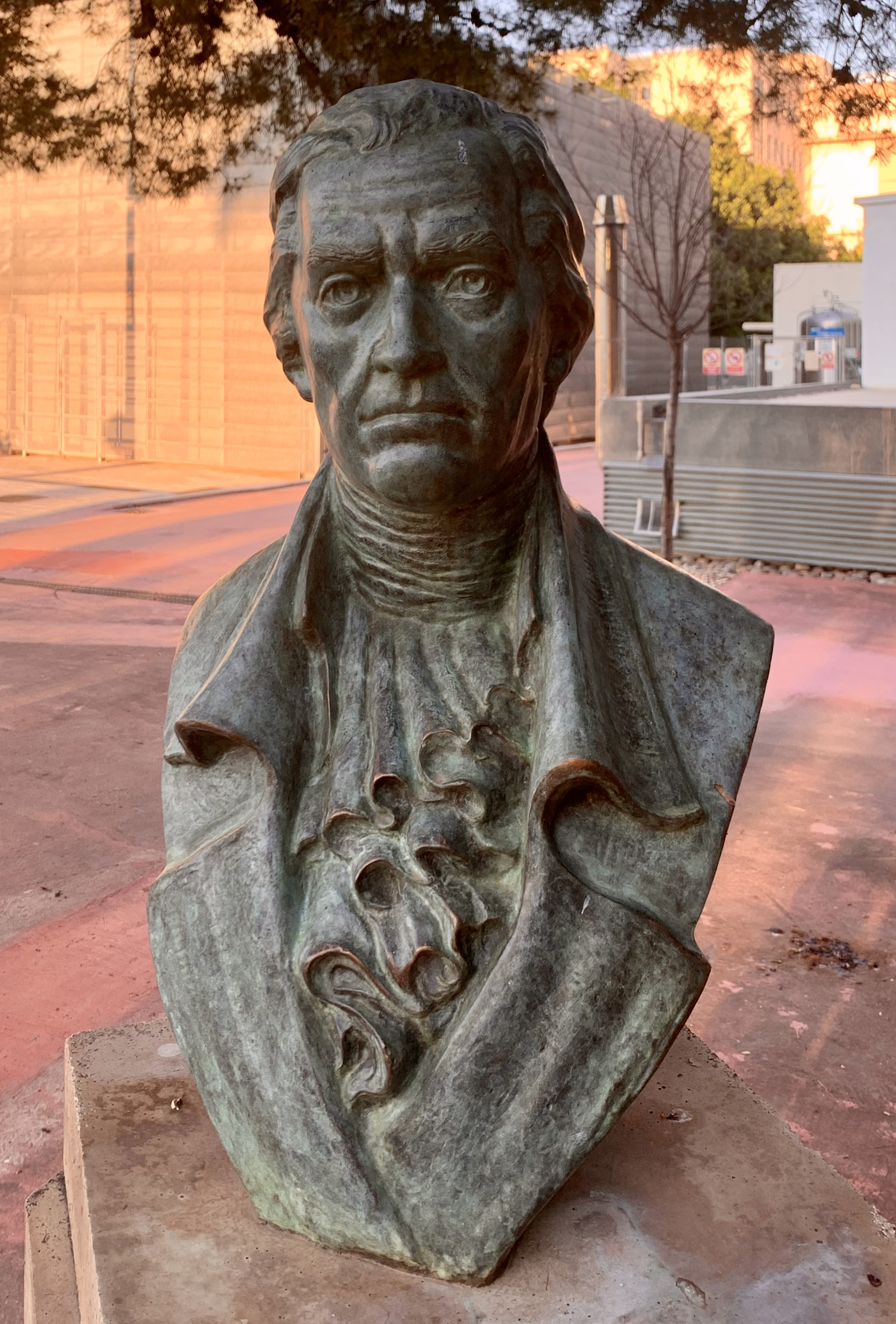
- Born: 2 December 1753; Alicante, Spain
- Died: 12 February 1819 (aged 65); Madrid, Spain
- Known for: Balmis Expedition
- Medical career
- Profession: physician
- Sub-specialties: military surgeon

Francisco Javier de Balmis (2 December 1753 – 12 February 1819) was a Spanish physician best known for leading an 1803 expedition to Spanish America, the Philippines and China to vaccinate populations against smallpox. His expedition was the first international vaccination campaign in history and one of the most important events in the history of medicine. It inspired recent vaccination efforts such as that of Carlos Canseco, president of Rotary International, to start the worldwide program PolioPlus to eradicate polio.

== Biography ==
=== Education and military career ===
Francisco Javier de Balmis was born in Alicante on 2 December 1753 and was baptized three days later at the Basilica of Santa Maria. His parents were Antonio Balmis, a Spanish barber surgeon whose distant paternal ancestor had likely arrived in Spain from France in the previous century. His mother was Luisa Berenguer. He followed the family tradition and at age 17 began studying at the military hospital of Alicante, where he stayed for five years.

In 1775, he enlisted in the Spanish Navy and joined an expedition under the command of Alejandro O'Reilly which aimed to put an end to the incursions of the Barbary pirates in the Spanish Levante.

Two years later he passed his examination and in 1778 obtained the authorization to perform surgery in Valencia. Due to the siege of Gibraltar, he joined the corps of military surgeons as assistant second surgeon. By 8 April 1781 he had attained the rank of surgeon and joined the regiment at Zamora. As part of this regiment he went to America in the expedition of the Marquess of Socorro. From the Venezuelan port of La Guaira, he embarked for Havana, then for Veracruz, and was the director of the hospital of Xalapa for three months. In 1786 he was appointed surgeon-major of the military hospital of San Juan de Dios in Mexico City, then the capital of New Spain. After the merger of this hospital with that of San Andres in 1790, Balmis became director of venereal disease ward. In recognition of his work he was admitted to the Real Academia Médica Matritense (the predecessor to the Royal Academy of Medicine) and received his Bachelor of Arts from the University of Mexico.

Balmis died in Madrid in 1819.

=== Scientific work ===
During 1788, on temporary leave from the army, he traveled throughout Mexico to devote himself to the study of local flora and traditional remedies used by natives. He conducted a series of experiments at the hospital of San Juan de Dios, publishing Tratado de las virtudes del agave y la begonia (Treatise on the benefits of agave and begonia) in Madrid in 1794.

Back in Spain, he became the physician of King Charles IV. He persuaded the king to send an expedition to America to propagate the recently discovered vaccine against smallpox. Balmis was named head of the expedition, which sailed from Spain in 1804. He traveled to Puerto Rico, Puerto Cabello, Caracas, La Guaira, Havana, Mérida, Veracruz and Mexico City. The vaccine was carried as far as Texas in the north and New Granada in the south.

In Mexico City, he had to convince the viceroy, José de Iturrigaray, but he did so, and the viceroy had his son vaccinated.

In 1806 Balmis sailed from Acapulco for Manila, and in 1806 arrived back in Spain. He returned to Mexico again in 1810.

He wrote Instrucción sobre la introducción y conservación de la vacuna (Instructions for the introduction and conservation of the vaccine), and translated Moreau's work on the same subject, Tratado histórico-práctico, from the French.

Miguel Muñoz conserved and spread the vaccine in Mexico until 1844, when the project was taken over by his son Luis. After Luis Muñoz, Luis Malanco was in charge of the project.

== Gallery ==
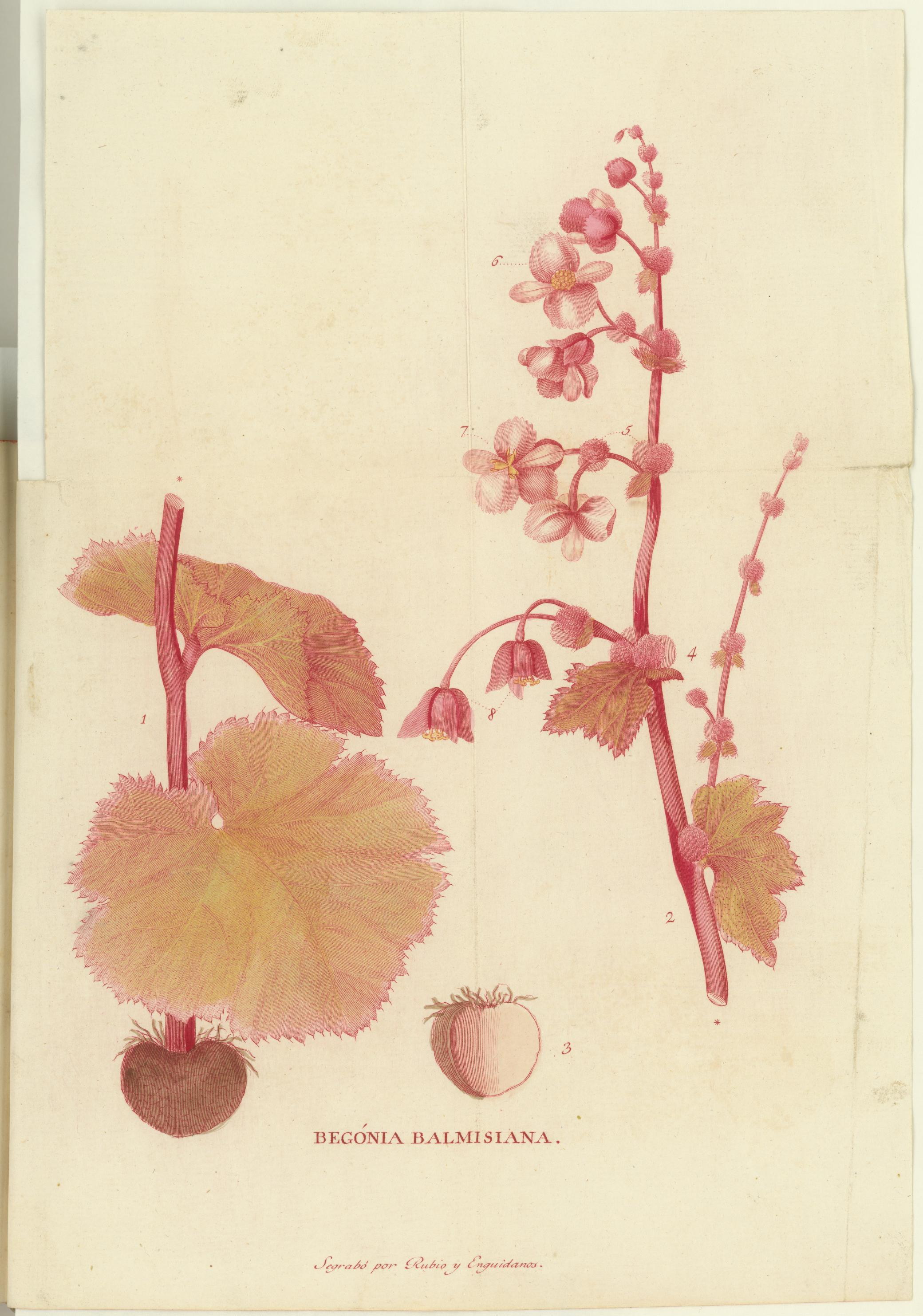
Drawing of a begonia showing flowers, seed pods, and leaves. Published in Demostracion de las eficaces virtudes neuvamente... (Madrid: 1794).

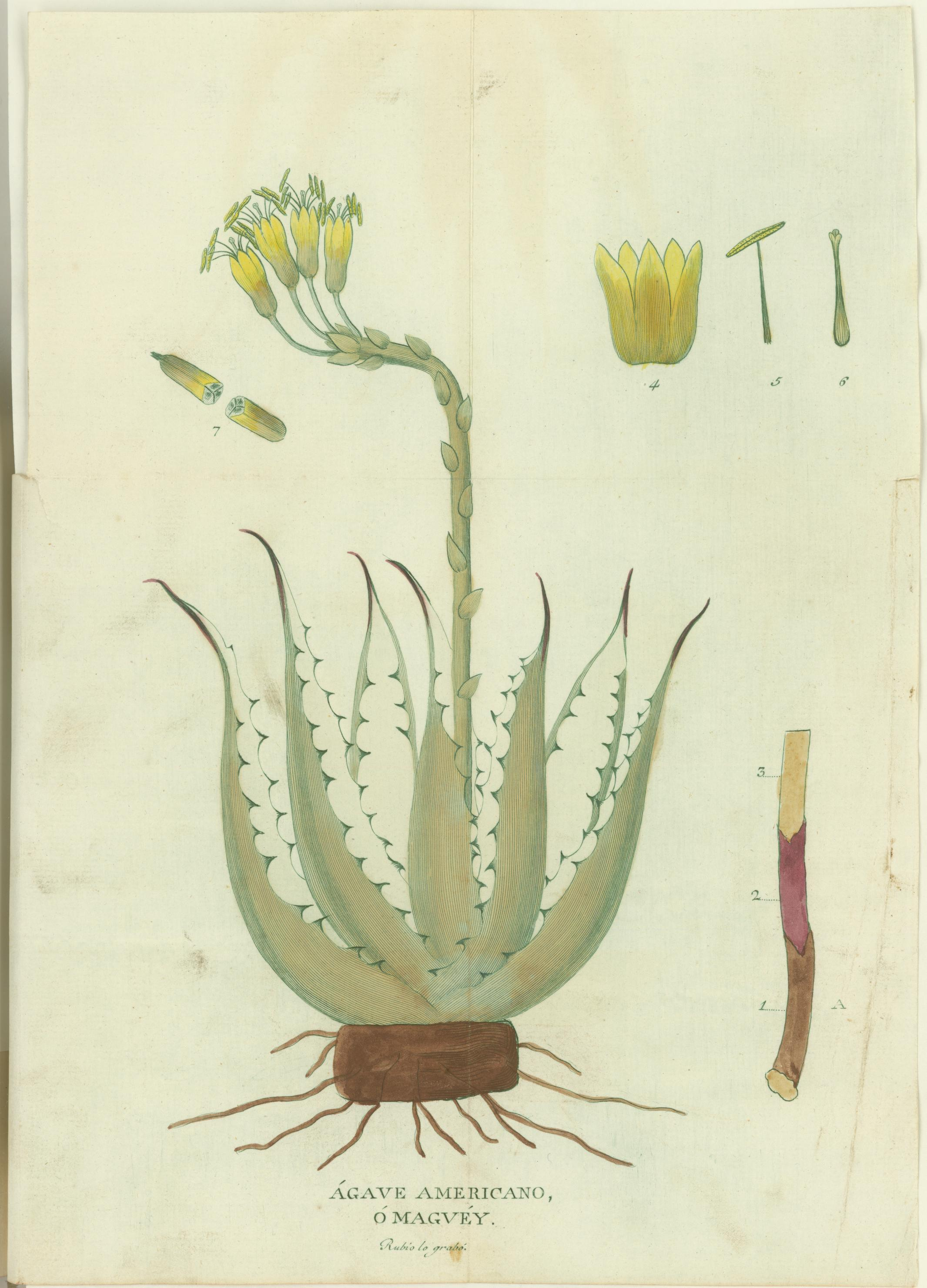
Drawing of an agave americana or maguey cactus with details of flower, pistil, calyx, and stamen, and a fragment of the root. Published in Demostracion de las eficaces virtudes neuvamente... (Madrid: 1794).
