= Busdongo de Arbas =

Place in Castile and León, Spain

- Village
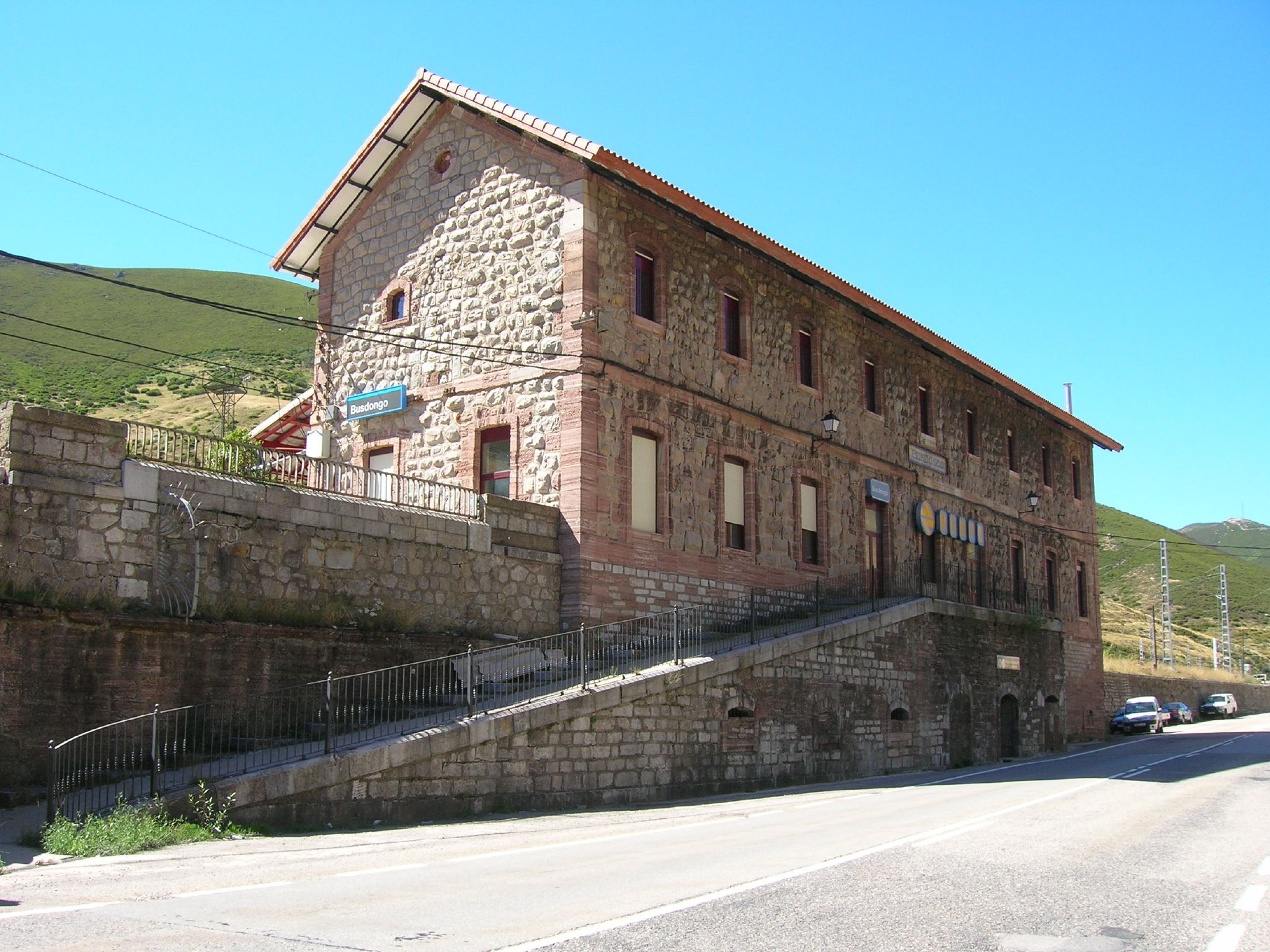

- Location within Province of León Location within Castile and León Location within Spain
- Coordinates: 42°59′5″N 5°42′26″W
- Country: Spain
- Autonomous community: Castile and León
- Province: Province of León
- Municipality: Villamanín
- Elevation: 1,233 m (4,045 ft)

Population
  - Total: 44

Busdongo de Arbas is a locality and minor local entity located in the municipality of Villamanín, in León province, Castile and León, Spain. It is the birthplace of Amancio Ortega, once the wealthiest man in the world. As of 2020, it has a population of 44.

== Geography ==
Busdongo de Arbas is located 55km north-northwest of León.
