= Zeltia =

Former Spanish pharmaceutical company

Zeltia, S.A.
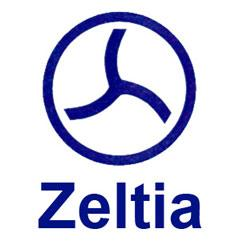
- Company type: Sociedad Anónima
- Traded as: BMAD: ZEL
- ISIN: ES0184940817
- Industry: Pharmaceutical
- Founded: Vigo, Galicia, Spain (August 3, 1939)
- Defunct: 2015
- Headquarters: Madrid, Spain
- Area served: Worldwide
- Key people: José Fernández Sousa-Faro (Chairman)
- Products: Pharmaceuticals
- Revenue: ▲US$176 million (2009)
- Operating income: ▲ (US$46.3) million (2009)
- Net income: ▲ (US$40.3) million (2009)
- Total assets: ▲US$302.9 million (2009)
- Total equity: ▼US$59 million (2009)
- Subsidiaries: PharmaMar, Genómica, Sylentis, Zelnova, Xylazel
- Website: www.zeltia.com

Zeltia is a former Spanish pharmaceutical company which operated through a variety of subsidiaries in the pharmaceutical and chemical industries. As of 2007, Zeltia's research activities in the pharmaceutical area had not resulted in a marketed product. However, the company's majority shareholder and chairman are the same person, which has relieved the pressure which many CEOs have experienced to produce immediate returns.

== History ==
Zeltia is a group of chemical and pharmaceutical companies founded in Vigo in 1939 as a spin-off of the Miguel Servet laboratory. Its driving force was the Fernández López brothers from Lugo. Initially, the company was supported by the scientific contributions of Fernando Calvet Prats, who came from the University of Santiago and had been repressed by the Franco regime at the end of the Civil War. Calvet contributed his technical knowledge to the company until he was reinstated at the University of Salamanca in the 1944-45 academic year.

The initial objective of the company was to exploit the medicinal flora of our country and the use of products from animal glands obtained from the meat companies, with which the Fernández López brothers operated through the slaughterhouses of Porriño and Mérida.

Once an agreement was reached with Obella, Calvet returned to Spain and resumed his position at the company. The relative importance of each of the actors in this venture is clearly illustrated by the fact that the Fernández López brothers (four brothers) were registered in the founding of Zeltia, each with 200 shares; Dr. Obella Vidal with 200 shares; José Ruiz with 25 shares; Fernando Calvet Prats with 25 shares; and Fidel Isla Couto with 10 shares.

Fernando Calvet, who worked as technical director of the Miguel Servet Laboratories in Vigo (Biochemical Institute) at the end of the 1935-36 academic year, was tasked with organizing a laboratory to study methods for preserving, analyzing, and extracting ergot from rye in order to obtain alkaloids used to manufacture the drug “Pan-Ergot,” indicated for the treatment of migraines and glaucoma. The director of this pharmaceutical company was Dr. Obella Vidal, a Galician nationalist, associated with a pharmacist named Rubira. As soon as the civil war broke out, Calvet fled to Sweden and Obella registered a trademark in Portugal under the name Zeltia in August 1937 for the exploitation of ergot. Among other things, he obtained a concession to grow medicinal plants in the Porriño area, where the Fernández López brothers had most of their businesses.

In 1993 Zeltia sells its subsidiary Cooper-Zeltia taking the name CZ Veterinaria, which years later would be renamed Zendal.

The company was taken over by its subsidiary Pharma Mar in a reverse takeover, keeping Zeltia's group structure.

In 2018 PharmaMar sells Xylazel to the Dutch company AkzoNobel.

In 2019 PharmaMar sells Zelnova, the group's last subsidiary in Galicia, to the Galician investment company Allentia Invest for 33 million euros.

== Subsidiaries ==
Direct subsidiaries as of 2009 were: Pharma Mar, S.A.U.; Genómica, S.A.U.; Zelnova, S.A; Protección de Maderas, S.A.U; Xylazel, S.A.; Noscira, S.A.; Sylentis, S.A.

Indirect subsidiaries which are direct subsidiaries of Pharma Mar as of 2009 were: Pharma Mar US; Pharma Mar AG; PharmaMar S.A.R.L.; Pharma Mar GmbH; Pharma Mar Ltd.

A single indirect subsidiary is a direct subsidiary of Zelnova, that being Copyr, S.p.A.
