= Balmis Expedition =

1803–06 Spanish Empire vaccination campaign

Royal Philanthropic Vaccine Expedition
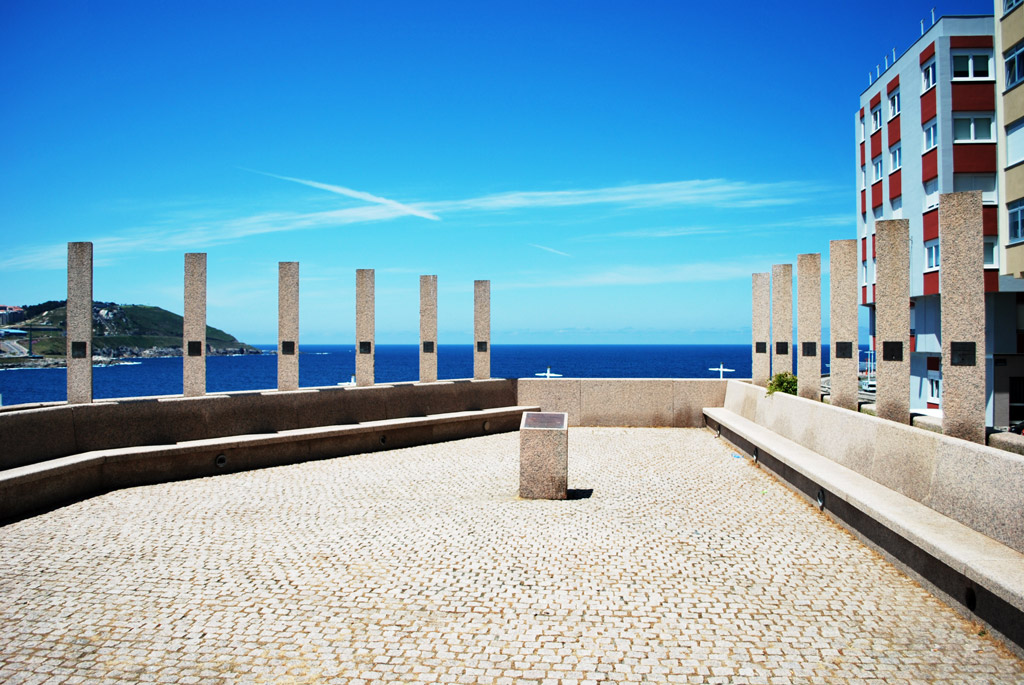
- Balmis balcony in the Domus museum in La Coruña (Spain), a tribute to the people of the expedition
- Date: November 30, 1803 – 1806
- Location: Spanish Empire
- Type: Scientific expedition
- Cause: High mortality rate in the viceroyalties of the Spanish Empire due to smallpox
- Motive: Vaccinate the inhabitants of the viceroyalties of the Spanish Empire against smallpox

Expedition by Balmis and his collaborators to America

Detail of expedition's routes in the Philippines

The Royal Philanthropic Vaccine Expedition (Spanish: Real Expedición Filantrópica de la Vacuna), commonly referred to as the Balmis Expedition, was a Spanish healthcare mission that lasted from 1803 to 1806, led by Dr Francisco Javier de Balmis, which vaccinated hundreds of thousands against smallpox in Spanish America, the Philippines, and China. The vaccine was transported through children: orphaned boys who sailed with the expedition and, for part of the journey, three enslaved girls from Cuba.

== Background ==
Smallpox, a devastating disease that was endemic throughout much of the Old World, decimated the populations of the Americas after it was introduced by the Spanish conquistadors in the 1500s. By the late 16th century, smallpox had become endemic throughout Spain's holdings in the Americas and epidemics occurred periodically over the next 300 years.

In the 18th century there were scattered attempts in the colonies to use variolation, an older, less-effective method of inoculation using smallpox material. These efforts did little to mitigate the epidemics and sometimes actually increased the spread of the contagion.

In 1798, English physician Edward Jenner pioneered the use of a vaccine to immunize persons with an inoculation of cowpox material. The new vaccine was a much safer and more effective way to prevent smallpox. At the time, about 400,000 Europeans died each year from the disease which was also responsible for one-third of all cases of blindness in Europe. The use of Jenner's new vaccine spread rapidly through Europe and had a significant positive impact on the severity and frequency of smallpox epidemics. The discovery of the vaccine had become known to King Charles IV of Spain, whose daughter was suffering from smallpox at the time.

The vaccine first reached Spain in late 1800 and by the end of 1801, several thousand persons had been vaccinated across the country. The efforts were well publicised in Spain and by 1804, dozens of papers, treatises, newspaper articles, and editorials had been published on the smallpox vaccine. Other areas in the Spanish Empire were experiencing a smallpox epidemic and called the king for supplies.

Francisco Javier de Balmis was a military physician.

== Expedition ==
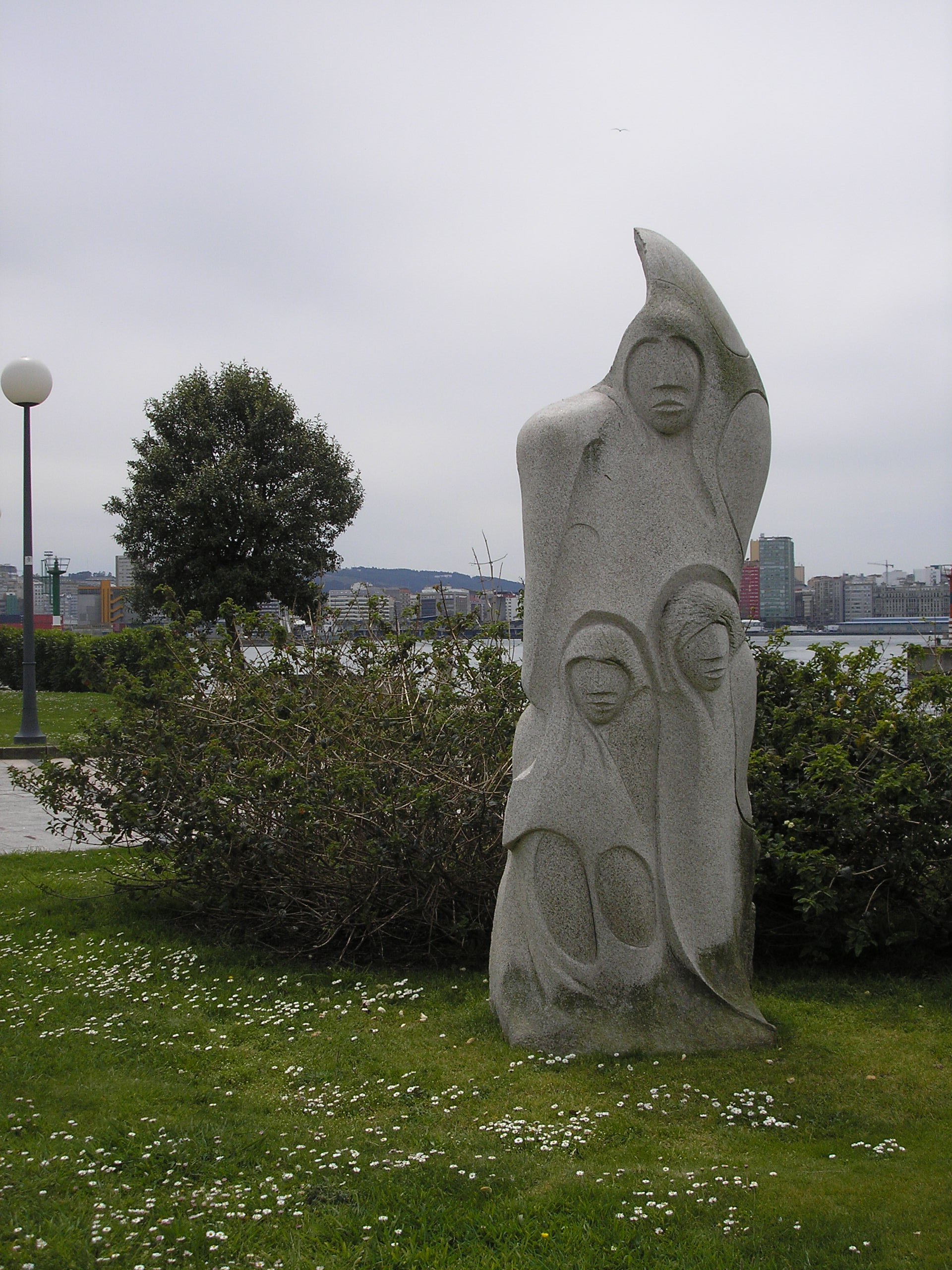
Monument in A Coruña in honor of the orphan children who took part of the expedition

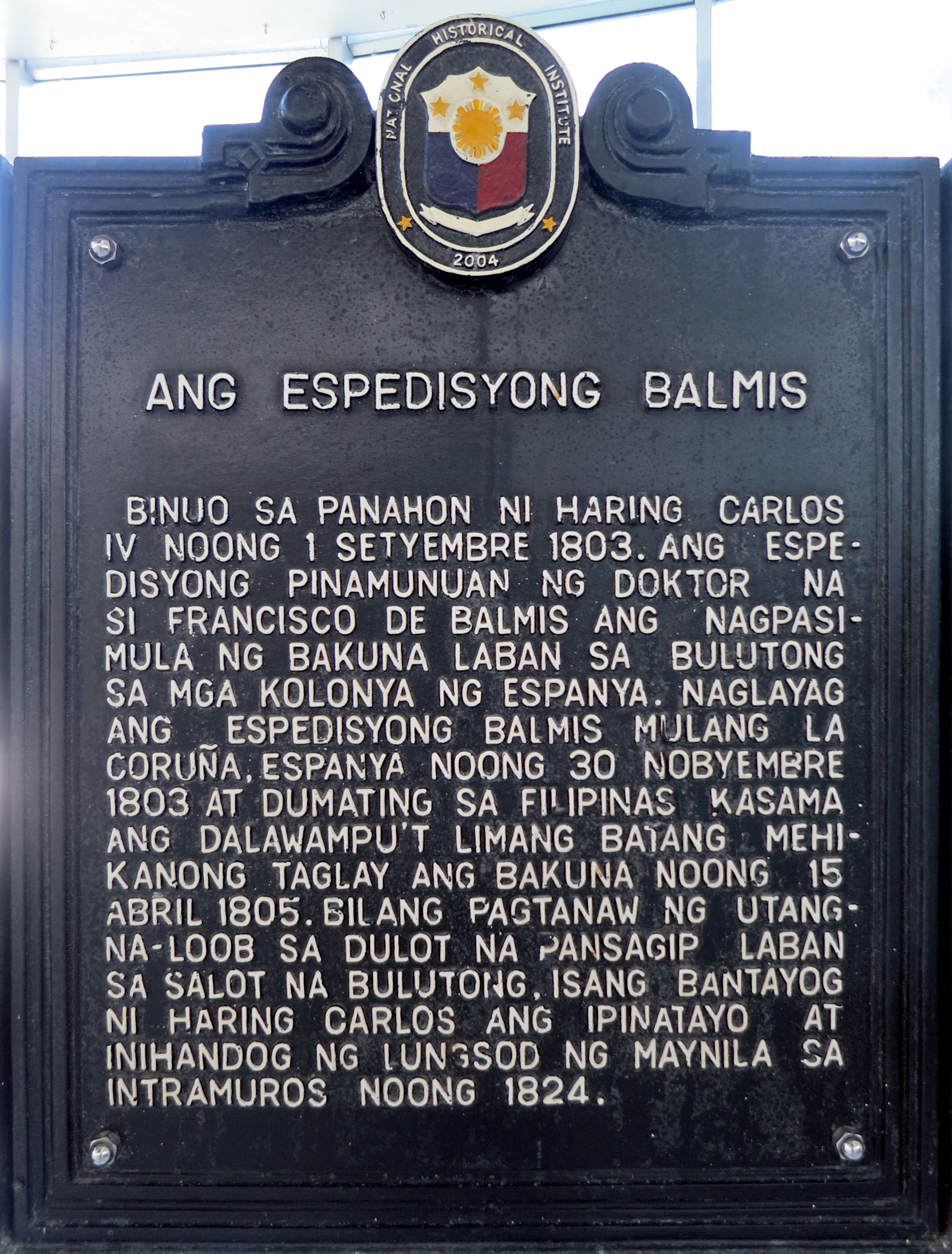
Historical marker installed in the Philippines to commemorate the arrival of the expedition in the Philippine Islands

On 30 November 1803, the expedition set off from A Coruña in northwest Spain sailing on Maria Pita. It carried 22 orphan boys (aged 3 to 10) to act as carriers of the cowpox virus. The boys were necessary because the vaccine consisted of infecting patients with cowpox, which is a virus closely related to smallpox but produces a much milder disease that confers immunity to both. However, only an active infection could be transferred to successive patients, so two boys were infected with cowpox at the beginning of the voyage, with two more infected at a time as it progressed across the Atlantic and beyond. The medical staff and caretakers for the boys consisted of Balmis, a deputy surgeon, two assistants, two first-aid practitioners, three nurses, and Isabel Zendal Gómez, the rectoress of Casa de Expósitos, an A Coruña orphanage.

The mission took the vaccine to the Canary Islands, Puerto Rico, Venezuela, Colombia, Ecuador, Peru, Mexico, the Philippines and China. The ship carried also scientific instruments and translations of the Historical and Practical Treatise on the Vaccine by Moreau de Sarthe to be distributed to the local vaccine commissions to be founded.

In Puerto Rico, the local population had already been inoculated from the Danish colony of Saint Thomas. In Venezuela, the expedition divided at La Guaira. Balmis went to Caracas and later to Havana.

At Balmis' request Cuba sent three enslaved girls to Campeche, Mexico, as additional carriers of the vaccine; following Mexican independence and emancipation, Mexico continued to bring in slaves from Cuba as vaccine carriers.

The Venezuelan poet Andrés Bello wrote an ode to Balmis. José Salvany, the deputy surgeon, went toward today's Colombia and the Viceroyalty of Peru (Ecuador, Peru, Chile, and Bolivia). The voyage took seven years and cost Salvany his life, as he died in 1810 in Cochabamba. In New Spain, Balmis took on 25 more orphans to maintain the infection during the crossing of the Pacific. In the Philippines, they received help from the Catholic church, which was initially reluctant until Governor-General Rafael Aguilar made an example by vaccinating his five children. Balmis sent most of the expedition back to New Spain while he went on to China, where he visited Macau and Canton. On his way back to Spain in 1806, Balmis vaccinated the population of the British colony of Saint Helena, despite the ongoing Anglo-Spanish War.

== Legacy ==
The Balmis expedition can be considered the first international healthcare expedition in history. Jenner himself wrote, "I don't imagine the annals of history furnish an example of philanthropy so noble, so extensive as this."

In 2006, Julia Alvarez wrote Saving the World, a fictional account of the expedition from the perspective of its sole female member.
