= PharmaMar =

Spanish pharmaceutical company

Pharma Mar S.A.
- Type: Sociedad Anonima
- Traded as: BMAD: PHM
- ISIN: ES0169501022
- Industry: Pharmaceuticals
- Founded: 1986
- Headquarters: Avda. de los Reyes, 1 Pol. In. La Mina, 28770, Colmenar Viejo, Community of Madrid, Spain
- Area served: Worldwide
- Key people: José María Fernández Sousa-Faro (founder and CEO)
- Products: Prescription drugs for central nervous system disorders and oncology
- Revenue: ▲€162.6 million (2018)
- Operating income: ▲ (€14.072 million) (2018)
- Net income: ▲ (€4.632 million) (2018)
- Total assets: ▼€157.676 million (2018)
- Number of employees: ▼600 (2018)
- Subsidiaries: Genomica; Sylentis; Zelnova (2015–2019); Xylacel (2015–2018)
- Website: pharmamar.com

PharmaMar is a Spanish pharmaceutical company headquartered in Colmenar Viejo, Madrid, Spain. Founded in 1986 as a subsidiary of Zeltia, it absorbed its parent company and all its subsidiaries in a reverse merger takeover in 2015. The company is a component of the Madrid Stock Exchange General Index (IGBM) and the IBEX 35 since 2020, after being part of the Ibex Small Cap stock market index.

PharmaMar's key ventures include the research and development, manufacturing and marketing of pharmaceutical drugs derived from marine-related resources for the treatment of certain cancers and Alzheimer's disease. Its subsidiary Genomica has also developed molecular testing procedures for infectious diseases including COVID-19. The corporation is also known for genetic analysis and paternity testing in the Spanish market. Its subsidiary Sylentis develops therapies based in gene silencing techniques like RNA interference.

== History ==
=== Zeltia (1939–2015) ===
Zeltia was founded in 1939 in Vigo as a spin-off of Miguel Servet laboratories. During these initial years, it focused mainly in the production of drugs for the treatment of cardiovascular and Metabolic Diseases and gynaecologic disorders as controlled-release insulin, sulfonamides, Alkaloids and ephedrine.

In 1963, Zeltia began to be listed in the stock exchange of Madrid. In 1964, it created three subsidiaries dedicated to the agricultural industry (Zeltia Agraria), the pharmaceutical industry (ICI Farma) and the chemical-veterinary industry (Zelnova) respectively. After an agreement with the German Desowag Bayer Holszschutz, in 1975 the Xylacel brand was created, which markets products for the treatment of wood and metal.

In 1984, Antibioticos SA and ICI Farma were released from the Zeltia group and in 1986 José María Fernández Sousa-Faro founded the PharmaMar subsidiary with the objective of developing Antitumor drugs from marine-based resources such as algae. In 1991, the Zeltia group decided to enter the market of genetic and molecular diagnosis with the creation of the subsidiary PharmaGen, which in 2001 was renamed Genomica. In the same year, PharmaMar achieved its first success by completing the chemical synthesis route to obtain the first drug against cancer developed entirely in Spain, the trabectedin (ecteinascidin 743 or ET-743). This chemical compound began to be marketed under the commercial name Yondelis after approval by the European Medicines Agency (EMA) and the Food and Drug Administration (FDA) for the treatment of soft-tissue sarcoma and uterine cancer in advanced stages. Continuing with the expansion of the Zeltia group in the field of biotechnology, the subsidiary Sylentis was founded in 2006, aimed at the development of therapies based on gene silencing. Between 2012 and 2015, Zeltia expanded throughout Europe, reaching Italy, Germany, France and the United Kingdom.

=== PharmaMar (2015–) ===
In 2015, with the aim of focusing in the group's main business, PharmaMar absorbed the entire Zeltia group by means of a reverse merger. In 2018, the Xylacel brand was sold to the Dutch multinational AkzoNobel and in 2019, the subsidiary Zelnova. At the beginning of the 2020, the PharmaMar group developed a specific diagnostic kit for the coronavirus based on diagnostic tests previously marketed by the subsidiary Genomica. This test allows a quick diagnosis, even before the patient shows symptoms.
