= Isabel Zendal =

Spanish nurse

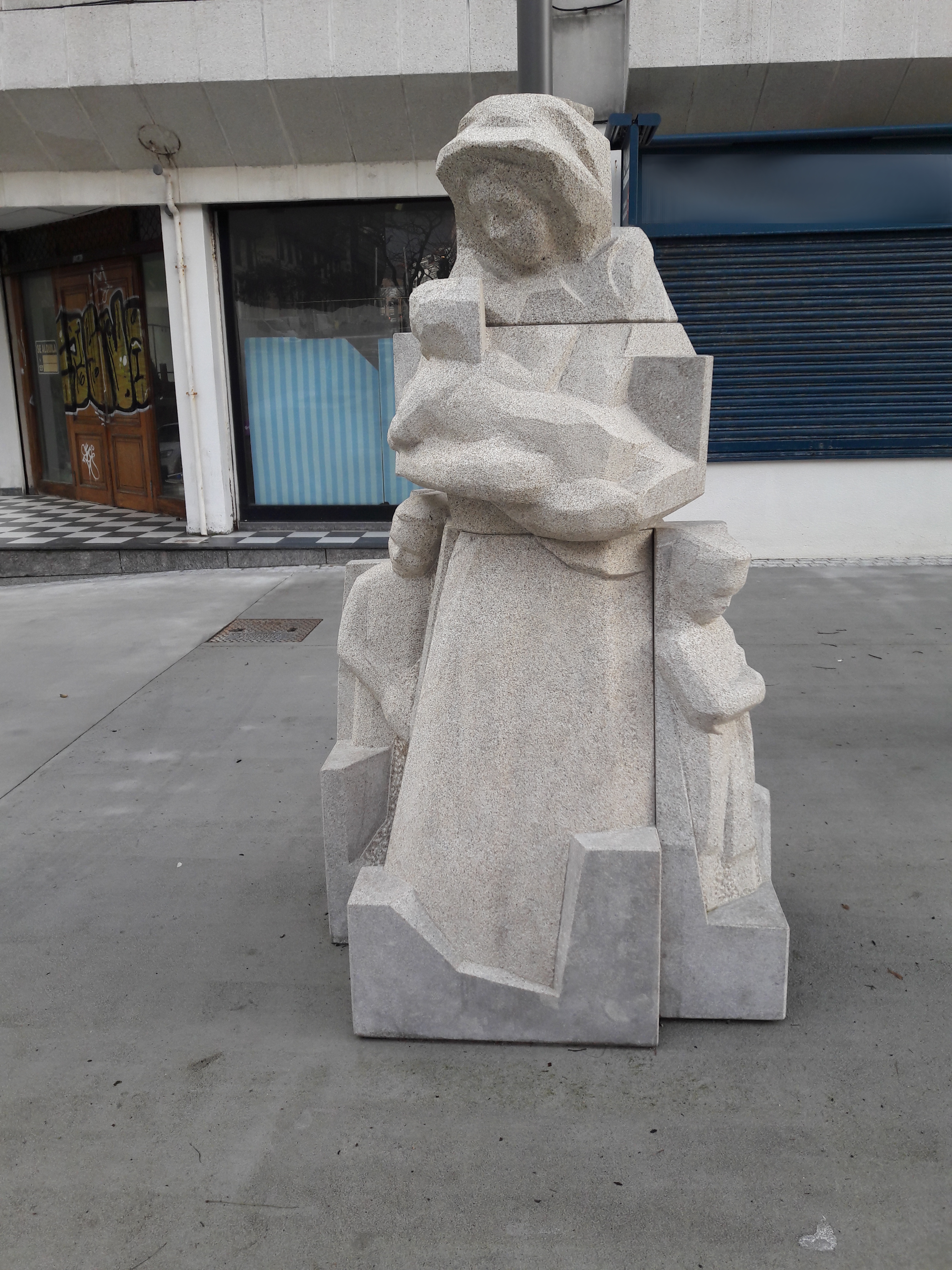
Monument to Isabel Zendal in A Coruña, near the site of the hospital where she worked. Work of Francisco Escudero

Isabel Zendal Gómez (born 1773) was a Spanish nurse from Galicia who took part in the Balmis Expedition (1803-1806, Real Expedición Filantrópica de la Vacuna), which took smallpox vaccination to South America and Asia.

She had previously been the supervisor or "rectoress" of an orphanage in A Coruña, and her role on the expedition was to take care of the group of 22, later 26, small orphan boys who carried the cowpox virus from which the vaccine was prepared.

The three-year expedition aimed to vaccinate millions of people against smallpox, and had the support of king Charles IV of Spain whose daughter had died of the disease.

== Name ==
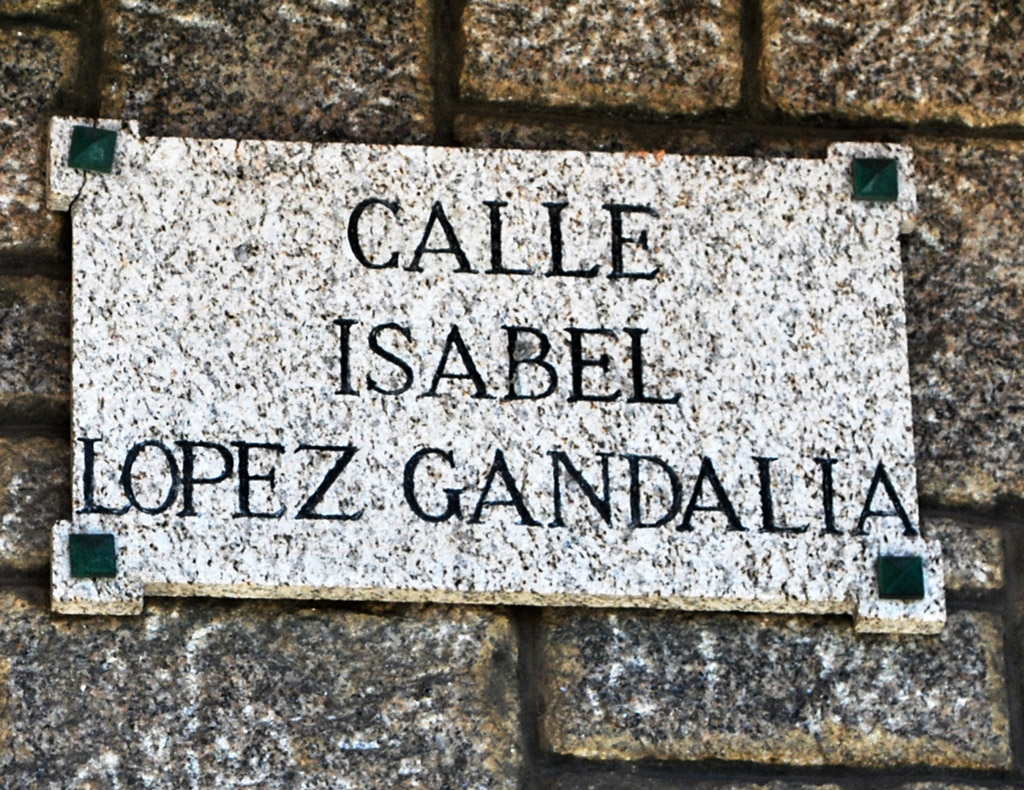

Her name has been spelled in some 300 different ways, including Isabel Sendales y Gómez', Isabel López Gandalia, Ysabel Gómez Sandalla and Isabel Cendala y Gómez. A street in A Coruña, Galicia, Spain was initially named Calle Isabel Lopez Gandalia in her honour. This name was changed in 2017 to Calle Isabel Zendal Gómez as a more accurate version of the name.

== Recognition ==
In 1950 the World Health Organization recognised her as the first nurse in history to take part in an international mission.

Julia Alvarez's novel Saving the World (2006, Algonquin Books ISBN 9781565125100) draws on Zendal's experience on the expedition.

In 2018 Spanish pharmaceutical group CZ Veterinaria renamed itself Zendal in honor to Isabel Zendal.

The Region of Madrid in Spain has named the Hospital de Emergencias Enfermera Isabel Zendal after her, which was built in response to the COVID-19 pandemic.

A statue of Zendal by Francisco Escudeiro was erected in A Coruna in 2020, in rúa Victoria Fernández España near the site of the hospital where she worked.
