= Rosalía Mera =

Spanish businesswoman (1944–2013)

- Born: 28 January 1944; A Coruña, Galicia, Spain
- Died: 15 August 2013 (aged 69); A Coruña, Galicia, Spain
- Known for: Co-founder of Zara
- Spouse: Amancio Ortega Gaona (m. 1966; div. 1986)
- Children: 2; including Sandra Ortega Mera
- Website: Official website

Rosalía Mera Goyenechea (28 January 1944 – 15 August 2013) was a Spanish businesswoman and fashion designer. At the time of her death, she was the richest woman in Spain and the world's richest self-made woman according to Forbes. She was ranked #66 among the world's most powerful women by Forbes in 2013. In 1975, she co-founded the Zara retail chain with her then-husband Amancio Ortega Gaona. The company grew to become the world's largest fashion retailer.

== Early life and education ==
Rosalia Mera Goyenechea was born in A Coruña, Galicia, Spain, on 28 January 1944. She was raised in the working-class Monte Alto neighbourhood of A Coruña, and left school at age eleven to work as a sales assistant and train as a seamstress.

== Career ==
Mera began designing gowns and lingerie in her home with her then-husband, Amancio Ortega Gaona. The couple opened the first Zara store in 1975 in A Coruña. Eventually the couple parlayed their work into a multi-billion dollar enterprise. Zara's success was in part due to its strategy of imitating popular fashions and quickly making them for sale at inexpensive prices.

Ten years after the opening of the first Zara store, Inditex was established as a holding company for the couple's businesses. Inditex now comprises multiple fashion companies, of which Zara is the flagship. The company also owns the retailers Bershka, Massimo Dutti, Oysho, Pull & Bear, Stradivarius, Uterqüe and Zara Home. Inditex has over 6,000 stores in over 86 countries as of 2013, and over 120,000 employees. Despite her 1986 divorce from Ortega, Mera retained a 7% stake in the company.

Mera also owned an interest in a company which made fingerprinting identification kits for newborns and another company, Zeltia, which researches cancer-fighting compounds of synthetic and natural origin, and in particular bioactive compounds originating in the ocean.

According to the 2013 Forbes billionaire list, Mera was the world's wealthiest self-made female entrepreneur, with a net worth of over $6 billion. She was the second-wealthiest person from Spain, second only to her ex-husband.

=== Assets ===
At the time of her death, Mera's fortune was valued at $6.1 billion (€4.6 billion). Her primary asset was a 6.99% stake in Inditex (representing 31.4 million shares valued at €3.2 billion), held through the investment vehicle Rosp Corunna Participaciones Empresariales, S.L. This entity also controlled a 5% stake in the pharmaceutical research company Zeltia, valued at €28.8 million.

Mera channeled her investments through two investment companies (SICAVs): Breixo Inversiones (with assets of approximately €200 million) and Soandres de Activos (with €350 million in assets). She also controlled Ferrado Inmuebles and held stakes in other companies including Room Mate hotels (over 30%), Galician Marine Aquaculture (30.5%), and Neonatal, a company producing biometric fingerprinting kits for newborns.

== Political and philanthropic activities ==
Mera opposed conservative Prime Minister Mariano Rajoy's plans to make Spain's abortion laws more restrictive. She specifically criticised the proposed reform drafted by Justice Minister Alberto Ruiz-Gallardón, expressing confidence that the bill "would not pass" and hoping the existing legislation "would be left as it is" because in her view it "is very good". On economic policy, she opposed austerity cutbacks to Spain's national healthcare and education programmes, stating: "If we haggle over health, childhood, or education, we are doing ourselves a great disservice".

Mera established the Paideia Foundation which works with groups in risk of social exclusion. The foundation, based in A Coruña, was created to support children with disabilities, inspired by Mera's personal experience as the mother of a son with cerebral palsy.

== Personal life ==
Mera married Amancio Ortega Gaona in 1966. The couple had a daughter Sandra in 1968, and a son Marcos in 1971, who was born with cerebral palsy. The couple divorced in 1986.

== Death ==
On 14 August 2013, Mera was admitted to a hospital in Menorca in an "irreversible situation" after suffering a stroke. The family had been on holiday in Menorca. Mera died on 15 August 2013 in A Coruña. She had been transferred by plane to the port city and then by ambulance to the Hospital San Rafael de A Coruña where she later died of stroke complications. Inditex confirmed Mera's death on 16 August 2013, stating "The group wishes to send its sincere condolences to her loved ones and friends at this extremely difficult time, after the loss of a person who contributed so much to the origins and development of the company." She was buried in the cemetery of the church of Santa Eulalia of Liáns, in Oleiros, Galicia.

Her daughter Sandra Ortega Mera inherited her wealth, and became Spain's richest woman with a net wealth of $6.1 billion.

== See also ==
- List of female billionaires
- Fast fashion
- Women in business
- Amancio Ortega
