= Amancio Ortega =

Spanish business tycoon

The Most Excellent Amancio Ortega OMC
- Born: Amancio Ortega Gaona; 28 March 1936 (age 90); Busdongo de Arbas, Spain
- Occupation: Businessman
- Known for: Co-founder of Inditex Group; Richest person in Spain
- Board member of: Inditex; Daez (COO)
- Spouses: Rosalía Mera (m. 1966; div. 1986) Flora Pérez Marcote (m. 2001)
- Children: 3
- Family: Ortega family
- Awards: Order of Civil Merit

Signature
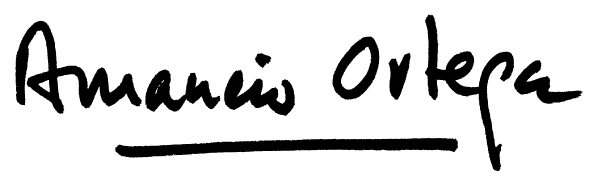

caricaturial figure representation of Amancio Ortega

Amancio Ortega Gaona OMC (Spanish pronunciation: [aˈmanθjo oɾˈteɣa ɣaˈona]; born 28 March 1936) is a Spanish billionaire businessman. He is the founder and former chairman of Inditex fashion group, best known for its chains of Zara and Bershka clothing and accessories shops. He is considered a pioneer in fast fashion. As of 2026, Ortega had a net worth of US$147 billion, making him the second-wealthiest person in Europe after Bernard Arnault and the 10th-wealthiest in the world. For a brief period of time in 2015, he was the richest man in the world, surpassing Bill Gates when his net worth peaked at $80 billion as Zara's parent company, Inditex's, stock peaked.

He is the head of the Ortega family, and the second wealthiest retailer in the world.

== Early life ==
The youngest of four children, Ortega was born in Busdongo de Arbas, León, Spain, to Antonio Ortega Rodríguez and Josefa Gaona Hernández from the province of Valladolid, and spent his childhood in Tolosa, Gipuzkoa.

Ortega left school and moved to A Coruña at the age of 14, due to his father’s job as a railway worker. Shortly after, he found a job as a shop hand for a local shirtmaker called Gala, which still sits on the same corner in downtown A Coruña, and learned to make clothes by hand.

== Career ==
In 1963, he founded Confecciones Goa to sell quilted bathrobes.

In 1975, he opened his first Zara store with his wife Rosalía Mera.

In 2009, Zara was part of the Inditex group (Industrias de Diseño Textil Sociedad Anónima), of which Ortega owned 59.29%, and aside from over 6,000 stores included the brands Zara, Massimo Dutti, Oysho, Zara Home, Kiddy's Class, Tempe, Stradivarius, Pull and Bear, Bershka and has more than 92,000 employees.

His public appearance in 2000, as part of the warm-up prior to his company's initial public offering on the stock market in 2001, made headlines in the Spanish financial press. However, he has only ever granted interviews to three journalists.

In 2009, he was appointed Knight Grand Cross of the Order of Civil Merit.

In 2011, Ortega announced his imminent retirement from Inditex, parent company of the Zara chain, stating that he would ask Inditex vice-president and CEO Pablo Isla to take his place as head. In 2012 Ortega donated about €20 million to Caritas Internationalis, a Roman Catholic relief organisation.

He purchased the Torre Picasso skyscraper in Madrid. He also purchased the Epic Residences and Hotel in Miami, Florida.

In July 2017, for its second edition of the AEF awards, the Spanish Association of Foundations awarded Amancio Ortega in the 2017 Philanthropic Initiative category. He also donated 300 million euros to fight cancer across Spain, which were invested in the purchase of 440 machines to detect the disease. As a result of this, the number of Spanish public hospitals equipped with stereotactic radiotherapy machines has risen from 20 to 70. However, these decisions were not unanimously welcomed and were criticized by some political parties like Podemos. News reports indicated that he bought the Troy Block complex, known to the public as one of the buildings where Amazon Seattle has its headquarters.

It was revealed in July 2020 that Ortega's property holdings, through his investment company Pontegadea, were worth $17.2 billion. Ortega is the executive chairman of Pontegadea, and real estate assets in his portfolio include Manhattan’s Haughwout Building and Southeast Financial Center. In 2019, the company completed a $72.5 million deal for a downtown Chicago hotel, which followed purchases of a building in Washington’s central business district and two Seattle office buildings.

Ortega was reported to have lost $10 billion as a result of the coronavirus pandemic.

=== Net worth ===
Amancio Ortega's fortune in 2021 was estimated to be around 73.1 billion euros.

In 2012 he was the largest shareholder of Inditex, with almost 60-65%.

Through the Pontegadea company, he brings together all his assets based on real estate investment and financial investments. Regarding real estate assets, this is concentrated in Madrid and Barcelona, located on the axis of the main business streets of both cities, where it has more than twenty properties distributed along Paseo de la Castellana, Serrano, Recoletos, Ortega y Gasset (Madrid) and on Paseo de Gracia or via Laietana (Barcelona). Internationally, he also owns properties in five other major European capitals (Paris, Berlin, Rome, Lisbon and London).

In December 2019, Pontegadea acquired 5% of the energy company Enagás for 281.64 million euros. In July 2021, it acquired the same percentage of the also energy company Red Eléctrica and 12% of Redes Energéticas Nacionais, operators of the Spanish and Portuguese electricity grids respectively.

In 2024, Forbes listed Ortega's net worth at $103 billion.

== Philanthropy ==
In 2001, he established the Amancio Ortega Foundation, a private non-profit institution headquartered in Arteixo (A Coruña), aimed at promoting various types of activities, primarily in the fields of education and social welfare. Among its initiatives, the foundation donated €20 million to Caritas in October 2012, marking the largest single donation ever received by the NGO in its history. The foundation also runs a scholarship program for students to complete their first year of Baccalaureate studies (equivalent to high school) in Canada and the United States, open to applicants nationwide. During the 2016/17 academic year, 500 scholarships were awarded, with 250 students studying in Canada and another 250 in the U.S.

In March 2017, on the occasion of its founder’s 81st birthday, the foundation announced its largest donation to date: €320 million to public healthcare systems to combat cancer. This donation expanded on a previous €17 million contribution made in 2015 to hospitals in Galicia and Andalusia. The funds were used to purchase and maintain over 290 state-of-the-art cancer detection and treatment systems in hospitals across Spain.

In July 2017, the Spanish Association of Foundations (AEF) honored Amancio Ortega with the 2017 Philanthropic Initiative Award during the second edition of its AEF Awards.

In November 2024, he created a €100 million fund to mitigate the impact of the DANA (a severe weather system) on the hardest-hit populations in Valencia.

== Personal life ==
Ortega is very private about his personal life, and has only given three interviews to journalists as of 2012. Ortega is very reclusive and keeps a very low profile. Until 1999, no photograph of Ortega had ever been published.

He likes to dress simply, refuses to wear a tie, and typically prefers to wear a simple uniform of a blue blazer, white shirt, and gray trousers, none of which are Zara products.

He married Rosalía Mera Goyenechea in 1966, with whom he had two children, Marcos and Sandra Ortega Mera. The couple divorced in 1986. Mera died in August 2013 at the age of 69. He married his second wife Flora Pérez Marcote in 2001, with whom he had a daughter, Marta Ortega Pérez, in 1984. In 2017, despite owning a huge real estate portfolio he mostly lives with his wife in his apartment in A Coruña, Spain.

He owns two yachts: "Drizzle" and "Valoria B", as well as a Gulfstream G650 jet.

== See also ==
- List of billionaires
- List of Spanish billionaires by net worth

== Bibliography ==
- Blanco, Xabier; Salgado, Jesús (2004). Amancio Ortega, de cero a Zara: El primer libro de investigación sobre el imperio Inditex. Esfera de los Libros. p. 271. ISBN 978-8-497-34167-7.

Business positions
New title	President of Inditex; 1985–2011	Succeeded by Pablo Isla
