= Pablo Isla =

Spanish businessman and a State lawyer (born 1964)

- Born: January 22, 1964 (age 62); Madrid, Spain
- Education: Complutense University, IE University
- Years active: 1988-present

Pablo Isla Álvarez de Tejera (born 22 January 1964) is a Spanish businessman and a civil service lawyer who was chairman and CEO of Inditex, a Spanish corporation and the world's largest fashion group, from 2005 to 2022.

== Early life and education ==
Isla graduated with a law degree from the Complutense University of Madrid in 1987 being the second in his year and the best grade of the squad until the date. He joined the State Lawyers Corps in 1988, the 1st in his promotion.

== Career ==
=== Early beginnings ===
From 1992 to 1996 Isla was Director of Legal Services for Banco Popular Español. In 1996, he left that position and became the general manager of the National heritage department of the Directorate-General for the Treasury. In 1998, he rejoined Banco Popular Español as general secretary. From 2000 to 2005, he was chairman of Altadis.

=== Inditex, 2005–2022 ===
Isla was named CEO and deputy chairman of Inditex in 2005 and was named chairman of the company in 2011.

Under Isla, Inditex committed to eliminate the release of all hazardous chemicals from production and products by 2020. Isla has also committed the company to adopt an eco-efficient store model that can reduce emissions by 30 percent and water consumption by 50% by 2020.

Inditex expanded from 2,692 stores in 2005, to 7,013 stores at the end of 2015 under Isla's leadership. During the same period, he is also credited with leading the company's online expansion.

In 2022, Inditex paid Isla 12.4 million euros in his last year with the company, more than double what he received in 2020 as the executive president. He was replaced with Oscar Garcia as CEO and Marta Ortega as chair.

== Other activities ==
=== Corporate boards ===
- Bertelsmann, member of the supervisory board (from 2024)
- Logista, member of the board of directors
- Nestlé, member of the board of directors (since 2018), chair of the board of directors (since 2025)
- Telefónica, independent member of the board of directors (2002–2017)
- McKinsey & Company, member of the external advisory group

=== Non-profit organizations ===
- European Round Table of Industrialists (ERT), Member
- Museo Nacional Centro de Arte Reina Sofía, Member of the Board of Trustees

== Recognition ==
In 2017 Isla was recognized as the Best-Performing CEOs in the World's list by Harvard Business Review (up from 3rd position in 2015 and 14th in 2014). Likewise, from 2012 to 2013, Isla was listed on Barron's list of World's Best CEOs. In February 2020, he received the award for Best CEO of the Decade from Forbes Spain magazine.

== See also ==
- Inditex Group
