= Zara (retailer) =

Spanish multinational fast-fashion company

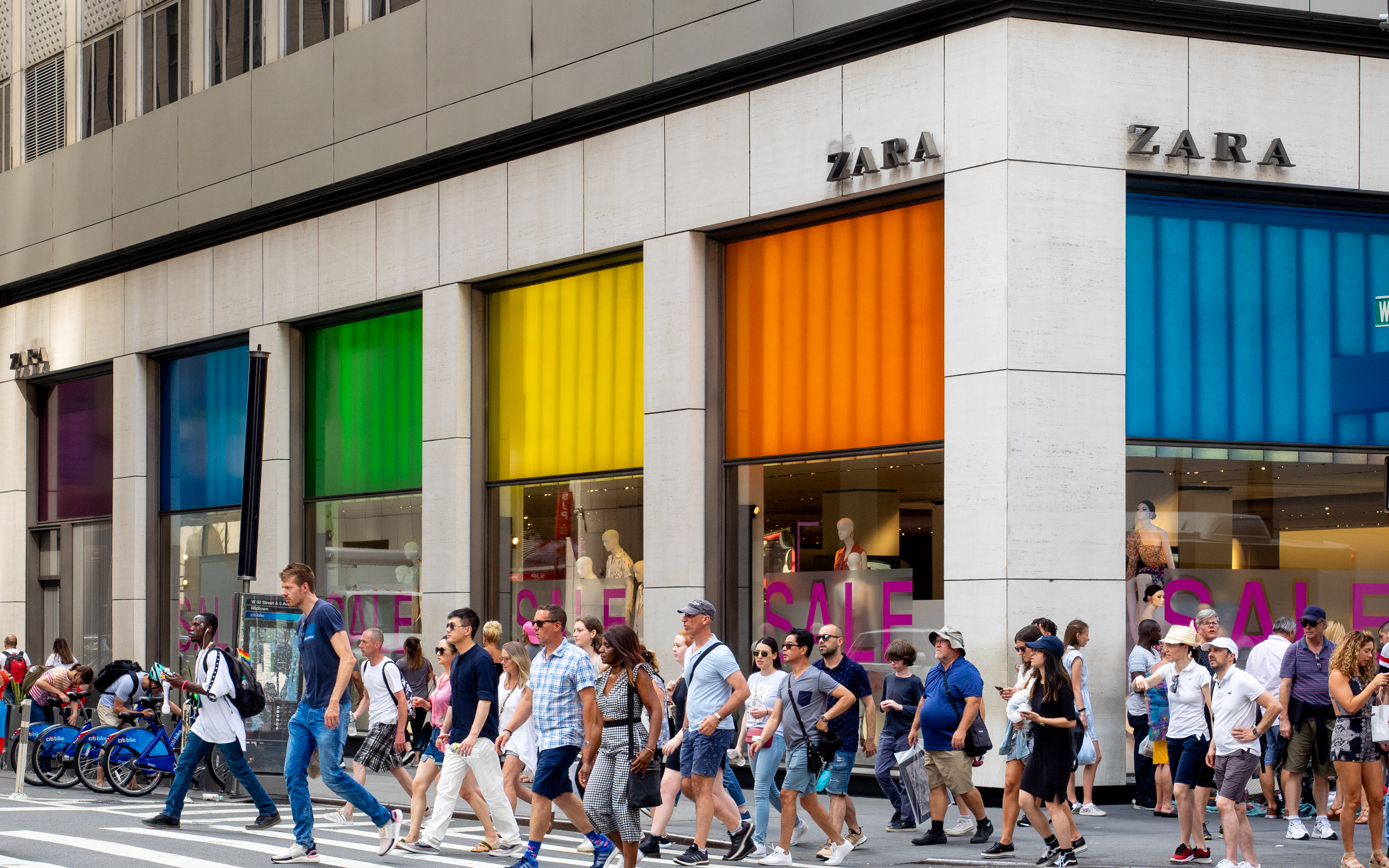
- Zara store in Midtown Manhattan
- Industry: Retail
- Founded: 1975; 51 years ago (as Zorba) in Spain
- Founders: Amancio Ortega; Rosalía Mera
- Headquarters: Arteixo, Galicia, Spain
- Number of locations: 2,040 stores
- Area served: Worldwide
- Key people: Amancio Ortega
- Products: Clothing
- Revenue: €27.778 billion (2024)
- Parent: Inditex
- Website: zara.com

Zara (/ˈzɑːrə/; Spanish: [ˈθaɾa]) is a Spanish fast fashion retail subsidiary of the Spanish multinational fashion design, manufacturing, and retailing group Inditex. Zara sells clothing, accessories, beauty products and perfumes. The head office is located at Arteixo in the province of A Coruña, Spain. In 2020 alone, it launched over twenty new product lines.

== History ==
=== Early history ===
Zara was established by Amancio Ortega Gaona and Rosalía Mera Goyenechea in 1975. Their first shop was in central A Coruña, in Galicia, Spain, where the company is still based. They initially called it 'Zorba' after the classic 1964 film Zorba the Greek, but after learning there was a bar with the same name two blocks away, rearranged the letters to read 'Zara'. It is believed the extra 'a' came from an additional set of letters that had been made for the company. It sold low-priced lookalike products of popular, higher-end clothing fashions. They subsequently opened more shops in Spain. During the 1980s, Zara changed the design, manufacturing, and distribution process to reduce lead times and react more quickly to new trends using information technology and groups of designers rather than individuals.

=== Expansion ===
The first shop outside Spain was opened in 1988 in Porto, Portugal. In 1989, the company entered the United States, and then France in 1990. During the 1990s, Zara expanded to Mexico (1992), Greece, Belgium, Sweden (1993), Israel (1997) and Brazil (1999).

In the 2000s, Zara opened its first stores in Japan and Singapore (2002); Ireland, Venezuela, Russia and Malaysia (2003); China, Morocco, Estonia, Hungary and Romania (2004); the Philippines, Costa Rica and Indonesia (2005); Colombia (2007); and South Korea (2008).

In the 2010s, Zara began to roll out locations in India (2010); Taiwan, South Africa and Australia (2011); and Peru (2012).

In September 2010, Zara launched its online boutique. The website began in Jordan. In November of the same year, Zara Online extended its service to five more countries: Austria, Ireland, the Netherlands, Belgium and Luxembourg. Online stores began operating in the United States in 2011, Russia and Canada in 2013, Mexico in 2014, South Korea in 2014, Romania in 2016, India in 2017, Israel and Brazil in 2019, and Peru in 2020.

In 2015, Zara was ranked #30 on Interbrand's list of best global brands. In 2019, Zara updated their logo. It was designed by the French agency Baron & Baron. The global fashion business Journal MDS stated that while the textile commerce of the world had gone down by 2.38%, Zara's had risen 2.17%. Chief Executive Persson said the brand is waiting for more acceptable global rent levels to continue its expansion. In Europe, the brand planned to cut the number of retail locations beginning in 2020.

In 2021, Zara left Venezuela due to the economic struggles in the country. As of January 2023, the clothing retailer has nearly 3000 stores, including its kids and home stores. Spanning over 96 countries and continuing to grow. In April 2023, Zara left Russia by selling the business to Fashion and More Management DVCC. The brand changed its name to Maag.

In September 2026, Inditex CEO Oscar Garcia Maceiras announced that the company is investing in the US as a key market for future growth.

== Corporate affairs ==
The key trends for Zara (including Zara Home) are as at the financial year ending 31 January:

	Revenue (Note: "Sales to third parties") (€ bn)	Profit before taxes (€ bn)	Total assets (€ bn)	Number of stores	Share of stores franchised (%)	References
2016	15.4	2.7	15.0	2,213	13	
2017	16.7	3.0	16.0	2,251	12	
2018	18.1	3.1	17.3	2,862	13	
2019	19.6	3.3	22.7	2,866	13	
2020	14.2	0.96	21.3	2,653	12	
2021	19.7	2.8	23.6	2,489	12	
2022	23.9	4.0	24.8	2,312	13	
2023	26.2	4.9	27.0	2,221	13	

On September 15, 2026, Inditex appointed Marta Andreia Rodrigues as director of Zara Woman. Rodrigues had previously worked at the company for 14 years.

== Visual identity ==
Zara logo from 1975 to 1988.

Zara logo from 1988 to 2008.

Zara logo from 2008 to 2019.

Current logo since 2019.

== Products ==
Zara stores have men's and women's clothing as well as children's clothing (Zara Kids). Zara Home designs are located in European stores. The majority of Zara customers are aged between 18 and about 35. After products are designed, they take 10 to 15 days to reach the stores. All of the clothing is processed through the distribution center in Spain. New items are inspected, sorted, tagged, and loaded into trucks. In most cases, the clothing is delivered within 48 hours. Zara produces over 450 million items per year. Zara also includes accessories, shoes, swimwear, beauty and perfumes. In May 2021, Zara launched its first beauty line, ZARA Beauty. Under its Zara Home line, Zara launched what is believed to be the first detergent that reduces the abrasion of textile microfibres during washing. It is claimed the solution, jointly developed by Inditex and BASF Home Care and I&I Solutions Europe in Spain and Germany, can reduce the release of microfibres by up to 80 percent, depending on fabric type and washing conditions.

In September 2026, Zara released its autumn outerwear collection, featuring traditional outerwear silhouettes, such as trench coats, leather jackets, bombers, and wool coats, updated with non traditional patterns, funnel necklines, contrasting collars, and unconventional colors.

== Manufacturing and distribution ==
Reportedly, Zara needs just one week to develop a new product and get it to stores, compared to the six-month industry average, and makes roughly 40,000 designs of which around 12,000 new designs are selected and produced each year. Zara has a policy of zero advertising; the company preferred to invest a percentage of revenues in opening new stores instead.

Zara set up its own factory in La Coruña (a city known for its textile industry) in 1980 and upgraded to reverse milk-run-type production and distribution facilities in 1990. This approach, designed by Toyota Motor Corp., was called the just-in-time (JIT) system. It enabled the company to establish a business model that allows self-containment throughout the stages of materials, manufacture, product completion, and distribution to stores worldwide within just a few days.

Most of the products Zara sells are manufactured in Spain, Portugal, China, Turkey, Pakistan, Morocco, Bangladesh and more recently - Armenia. While some competitors outsource all production to Asia, Zara manufactures its most fashionable items – half of all its merchandise – at a dozen company-owned factories in Spain (particularly in Galicia), Portugal (northern part) and Turkey. Clothes with a longer shelf life, such as basic T-shirts, are outsourced to low-cost suppliers, mainly in Asia.

The company can design a new product and have finished goods in its stores in four to five weeks; it can modify existing items in as little as two weeks, which results from its advanced operation management. Shortening the product life cycle means greater success in meeting consumer preferences. If a design does not sell well within a week, it is withdrawn from shops, further orders are canceled and a new design is pursued. Zara monitors customers' fashion changes. Zara has a range of basic designs that are carried over from year to year, but some fashion-forward designs can stay on the shelves less than four weeks, which encourages Zara fans to make repeat visits. An average high-street store in Spain expects customers to visit three times a year. That goes up to 17 times for Zara.

As a result of increasing competitive pressures from the online shopping market, Zara is shifting its focus onto online as well, and will consequently open fewer but larger stores in the future. In May 2022, a £1.95 return fee was implemented for some online orders in Britain and other core markets. This fee was introduced in Spain as of February 2023.

In November 2022, a pre-owned platform will also be launched via its website and app in UK. Other than posting now-unwanted Zara purchases online for sale, shoppers can book repairs and donate unwanted items online or via a store. If successful, this service will be expanded to other key markets. Starting November 2022, Russians will be able to order products online from a range U.S. and European brands, including Nike, Zara and H&M, according to an announcement from Russia's postal service.

In October 2024, Zara expanded its secondhand clothing platform, Zara Pre-Owned, to the U.S. The service, which allows customers to sell, donate, or repair pre-owned items, can be accessed across their app, website, and stores.

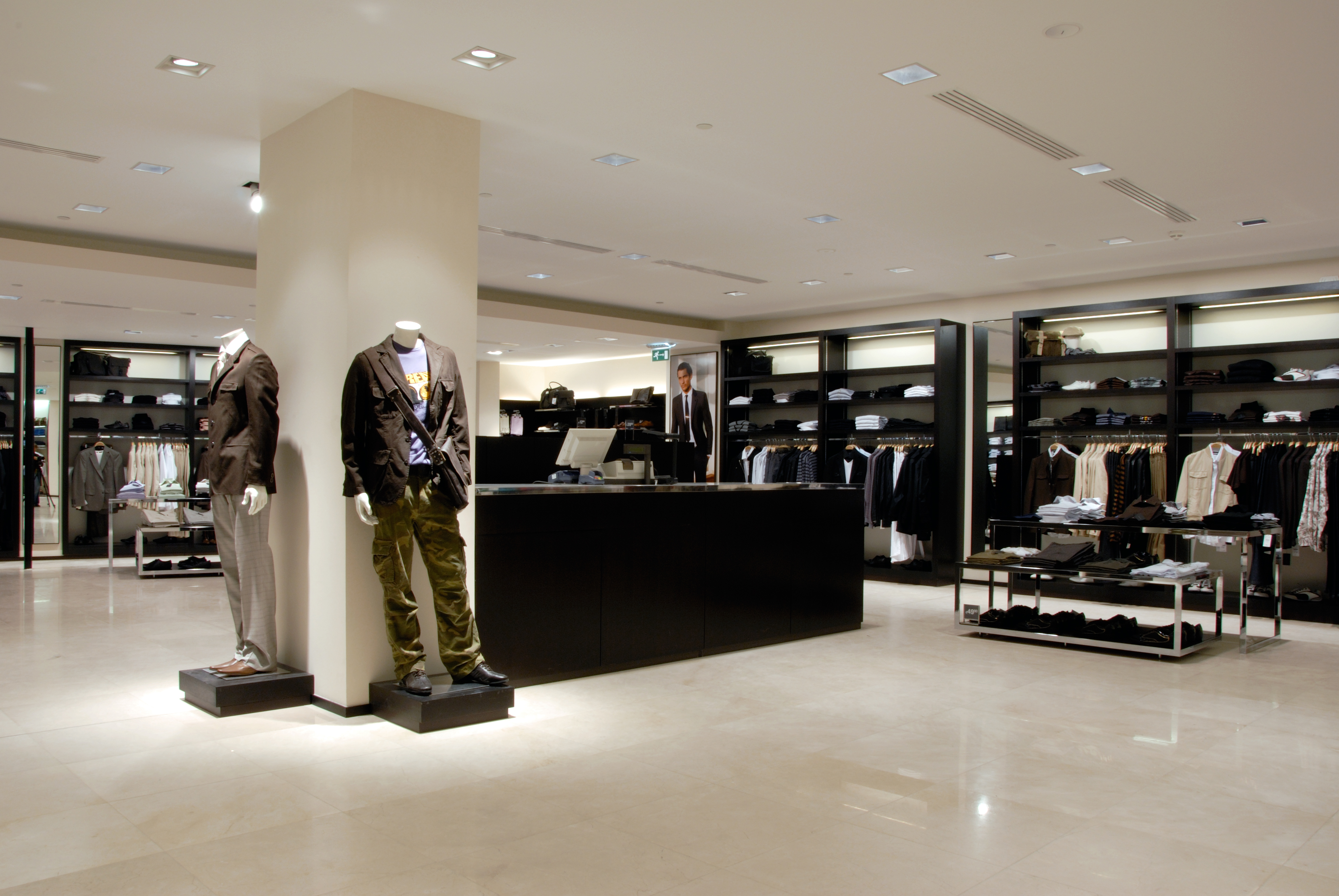
The men's department of a typical Zara store. Almere, Netherlands

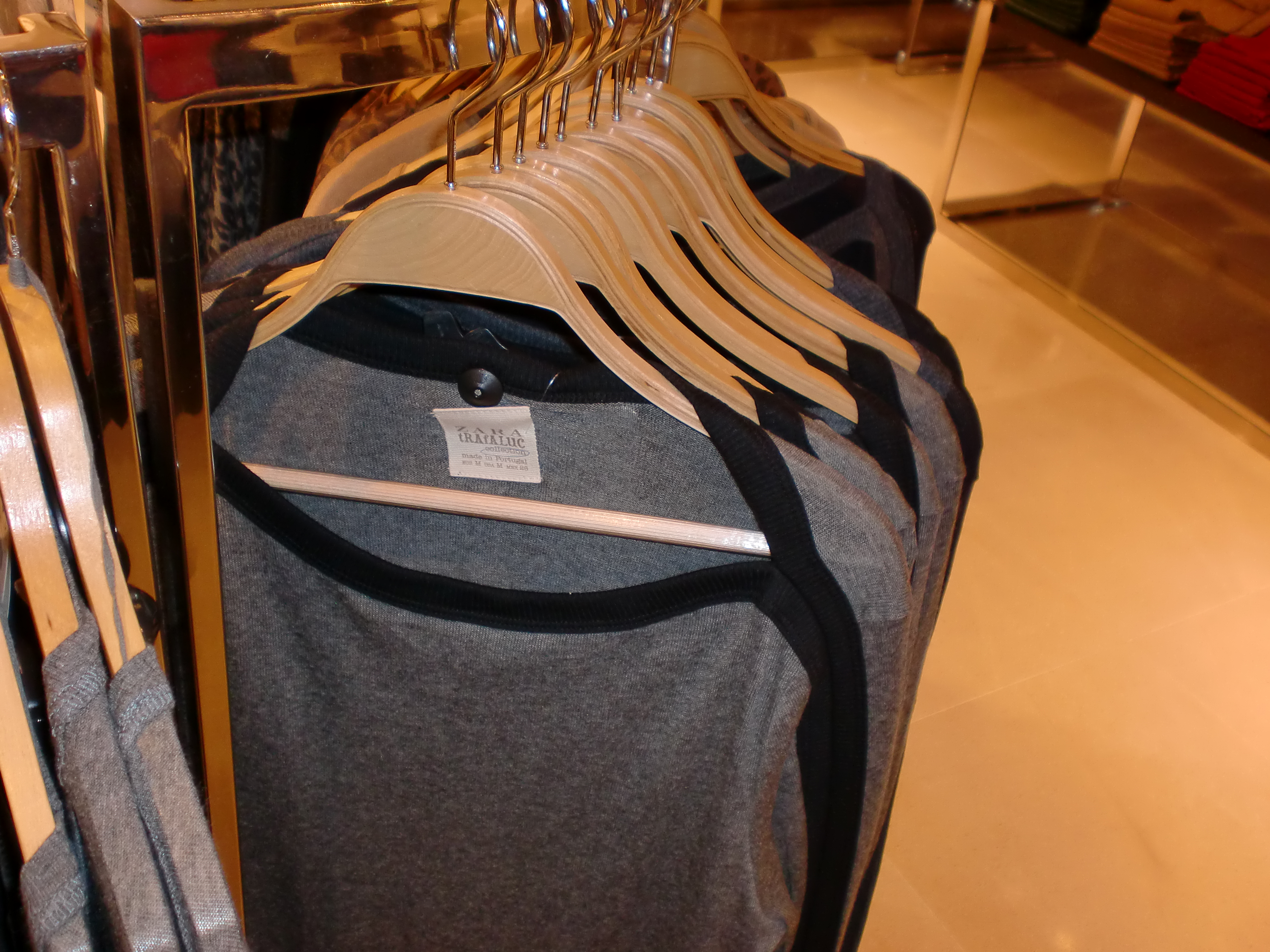
Zara clothing made in Portugal

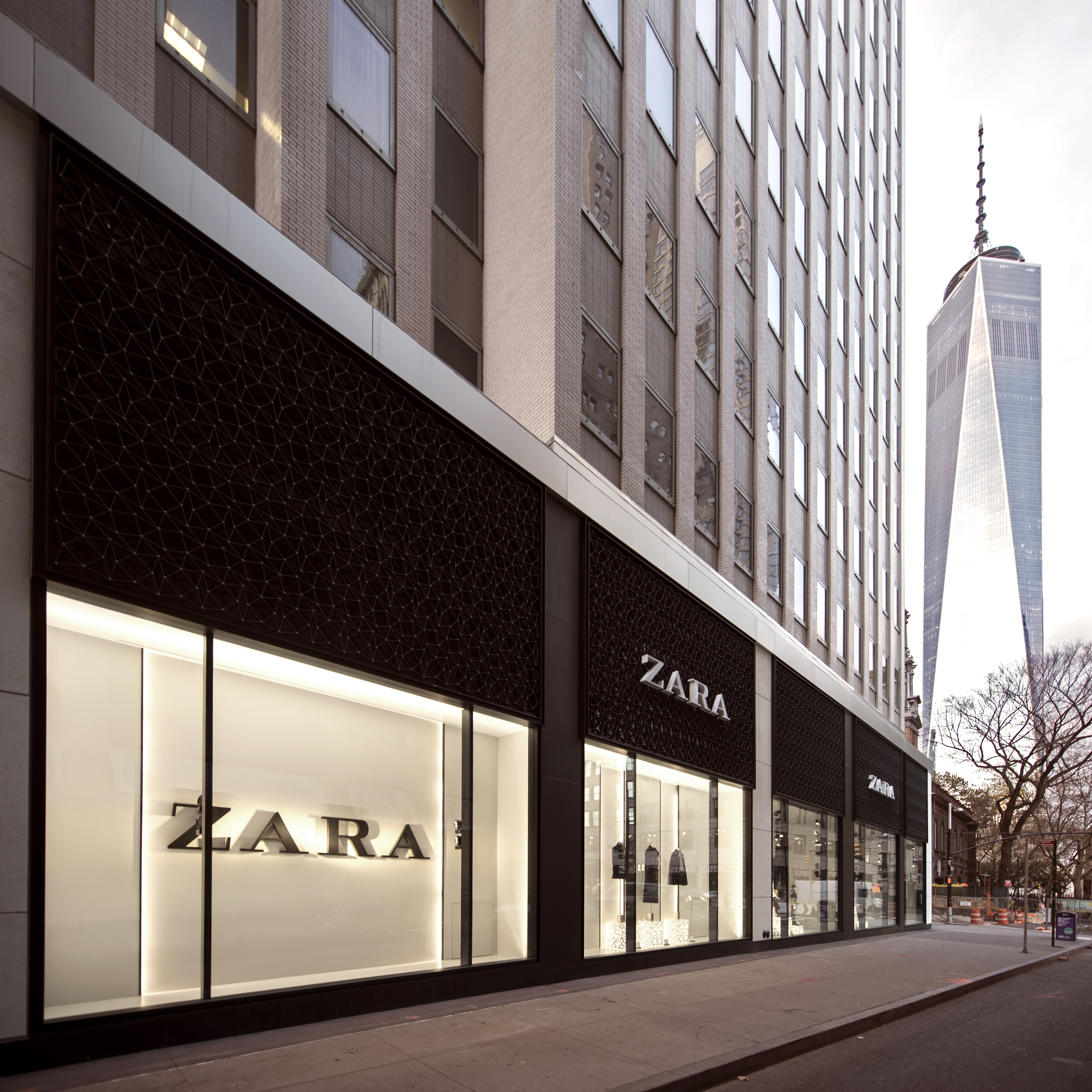
Zara store in New York City, near One World Trade Center

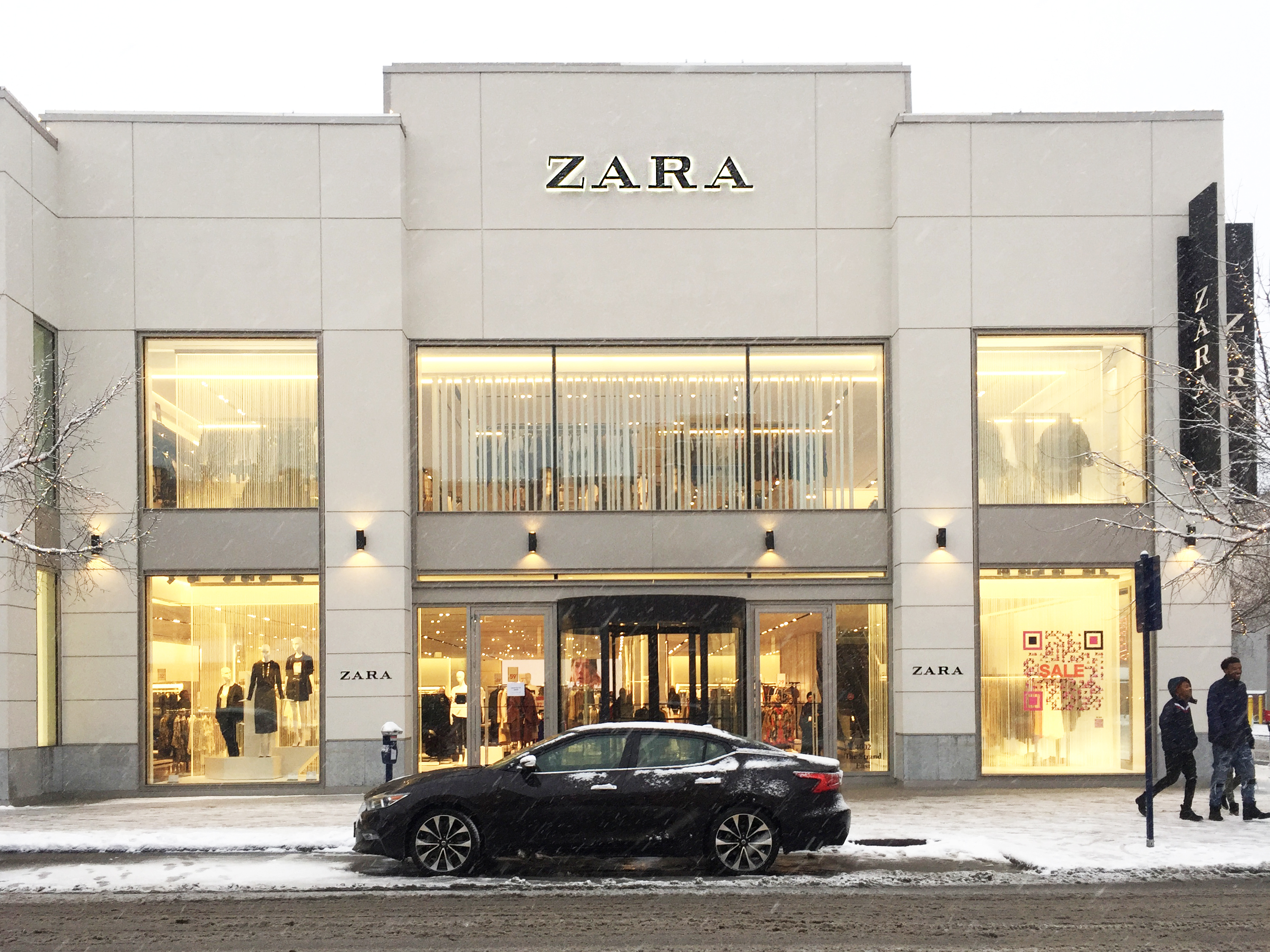
Zara store in Columbus, Ohio

=== Non-toxic clothing ===
In 2010, Greenpeace started a dialog with Zara to ban toxics from the clothing production. Greenpeace published its "Toxic threads: the big fashion stitch-up" report in November 2012 as part of its Detox Campaign identifying companies that use toxic substances in their manufacturing processes. Nine days after the report was published, Zara committed to eradicating all releases of hazardous chemicals throughout its entire supply chain and products by 2020. Zara became the biggest retailer in the world to raise awareness for the Detox Campaign, and switched to a fully toxic-free production.

== Controversies ==
=== Alleged antisemitic imagery ===
In 2007, Zara withdrew a handbag from its shelves after a customer noticed a swastika on the bag's design. The bag came from an external supplier, and Zara claimed the symbol was not visible when the handbag was chosen. Zara withdrew the product from stores, and spokesperson Susan Suett said the bag would not have been sourced had the symbol been apparent.

In August 2014, Zara received criticism for selling a toddler T-shirt for closely resembling uniforms worn by Jewish concentration camp inmates. The T-shirt was striped and featured a yellow star similar to the Star of David. Zara said, the design was inspired by "sheriff's stars from the classic western films". Zara removed the shirt from sale a few hours after they appeared for sale and apologized. Zara received criticism for selling the T-shirt in Israel because the country does not have sheriffs. Additionally, the word "Sheriff" is outlined in transparent letters on the bright yellow star. The Anti-Defamation League responded to the shirt, saying that it was offensive, but welcomed Zara's recognition of the potential imagery and removing the shirt from sale.

=== Labour practices ===
In August 2011, a Brazilian television show accused the company of using sweatshops for their outsourced production. The Regional Superintendency of Labour and Employment of São Paulo, Brazil, closed a factory that produced Zara's clothing for its poor labour conditions. Zara's representatives said the accusations of slave labour made against the retailer represent a breach of the code of conduct for workshops of Inditex. The company also states factories responsible for unauthorized outsourcing have been asked to regularize immediately the situation of the workers involved.

In September 2013, Bangladeshi garment workers for suppliers to Zara and its parent company, Inditex, protested following the 2013 Dhaka garment factory collapse, demanding a monthly US$100 minimum wage. Inditex does not publicly disclose the factories that produce their branded clothing.

In 2016, BBC News stated they found evidence of child labor and exploitation in factories in Turkey. Zara replied that there were some issues in June 2016 in one single factory and, instead of solving these issues immediately, they had given a period of six months to solve them.

In November 2017, customers shopping at Zara stores in Istanbul, Turkey, found handwritten notes purportedly from Turkish workers in the pockets of in-store garments asking shoppers to pressure Zara into paying them unpaid wages. The company clarified the unpaid wages were due to a third-party manufacturer Bravo Tekstil, who had failed to pay their employees in the period up to its closing after going bankrupt. The company said they would help to provide compensation to employees who weren't paid. In the agreement, only factory-floor employees were compensated, with "white-collar" employees not covered by the agreement.

In March 2019, Zara was found liable for "violating the fundamental rights of two sales assistants" at its stores in Almería, Spain. In October 2018, Zara decided to close its stores located in the Mediterráneo Shopping Center. All employees were reassigned, with the exception of 16 female workers who had reduced working hours to care for minor children; the company had proposed changes to their working conditions. Two of these workers turned to the CSIF union, believing the company was discriminating against them on the basis of gender. The company was ordered to reassign the employees under the same working conditions and to pay each of them €6,250 in compensation.

In 2022, about 1,000 shop assistants who work at Zara and other fashion brands owned by Inditex went on strike on Black Friday in the company's home town in northern Spain to demand better salaries. Before the second strike, Inditex, Zara's parent company, has agreed to pay 322 euros more per month to shop assistants from 44 stores. Workers also got a one-off bonus of 1,000 euros paid in February 2023.

In December 2023, Yle reported in Finland that the local Occupational Safety and Health Administration and Regional State Administrative Agency had investigated the four Zara stores under suspicions of illegal labour practices. In the investigation it was found that the workload the employees were subjected to were illegal. In one store, 95% of respondents to the authorities' enquiry felt that the workload is unbearable.

In May 2024, Zara agreed to a $1.25 million settlement to resolve allegations that it failed to include commissions in overtime pay calculations for approximately 500 employees, with 479 of them having joined the collective action. Zara was aware of this violation by mid-2018 but continued the improper pay practices until at least mid-2019.

=== Copyright infringement ===
In July 2016, complaints were made against Zara that they had been stealing designs from multiple independent designers for their products. One of the designers, Tuesday Bassen, who previously worked with brands including Urban Outfitters and Nike, contacted Zara. The company responded, saying Bassen's designs were not distinctive enough, and they received only a handful of complaints given the large volume of traffic they receive on their site. When the news was picked up by media outlets, Inditex, Zara's owning company, stated that the items in question have been suspended from sale, and that they were in contact with Bassen's lawyer to clarify and address the issue.

As of April 2018, MaXhosa by Laduma is taking legal action against Zara for copying its designs. Zara responded to complaints from the designer by removing socks that resembled his artistic style.

=== Melania Trump ===
In June 2018, a Zara jacket with "I really don't care, do u?" emblazoned on the back became controversial after it was worn by Melania Trump when she visited a detention center for migrant children separated from their parents.

=== Political controversy in China ===
In January 2018, Shanghai's internet authority summoned representatives of Zara, chastising the company for listing Taiwan as a country and ordering it to rectify the situation immediately.

In September 2019, Zara supported Hong Kong strikes; however after pressures from Chinese social media Zara was forced to issue a statement expressing its support of the "one country, two systems" policy adopted by China in ruling Hong Kong, and its disapproval of anti-government strikes.

=== Animal cruelty ===
In 2018, Zara's parent company Inditex committed to ban mohair from their products by 2020, responding to pressure from animal welfare groups regarding inhumane treatment of goats used for sourcing mohair.

=== Xinjiang region ===
In 2020, the Australian Strategic Policy Institute accused at least 82 major brands, including Zara, of being connected to forced Uyghur labor in Xinjiang.

=== Anti-Palestinian bullying and imagery ===
In June 2021, the company's women's head fashion designer Vanessa Perilman made anti-Palestinian comments in response to Palestinian model Qaher Harhash. After receiving backlash for her comments when they were made public by Qaher, Perilman apologized and Zara later asked Qaher to post Perilman's apology on his social media. Because of Zara's delayed response, and their decision to not fire Perilman, calls to boycott Zara emerged through social media.

In December 2023, Zara faced backlash over the release of their "ZARA ATELIER. Collection 04_The Jacket." campaign. The Advertising Standards Authority (ASA) received 50 complaints about the advert, which included photos of a model posing with a mannequin wrapped in plastic, and others where the model was surrounded by rubble and rocks with a cardboard cut out of what appeared similar to the map of Palestine. Commenters likened the similarity of the promotional photos to the images of the aftermath of air strikes in Palestine and called for a boycott of the brand. The campaign was subsequently removed from their app and website, and some images removed from their Instagram account. On December 12, Zara announced that it "regrets" a "misunderstanding" about the ad campaign and that it was photographed in September.

=== Trademark action ===
In April 2022, it was reported that Zara had taken legal action against "Tara Sartoria", a small clothing company owned by Vietnamese citizen Tara Nguyen. Nguyen's company sells products made by disadvantaged women in Indonesia and Vietnam.

=== John Galliano ===
In 2026, Zara signed John Galliano to a two-year creative partnership, returning Galliano to fashion after his Artisanal show for Maison Margiela in 2024.

== Stores ==
As of November 2021, there were 2,264 stores across 96 countries. Due to the COVID-19 pandemic, in early 2020, Zara stores worldwide closed temporarily due to restrictions. However, in April 2020 Zara's owner ramped up shipment to Asia as China ended its lockdown after 76 days.

== See also ==
- Bershka
- H&M
- Shein
