= Gordon Huether =

German-American artist

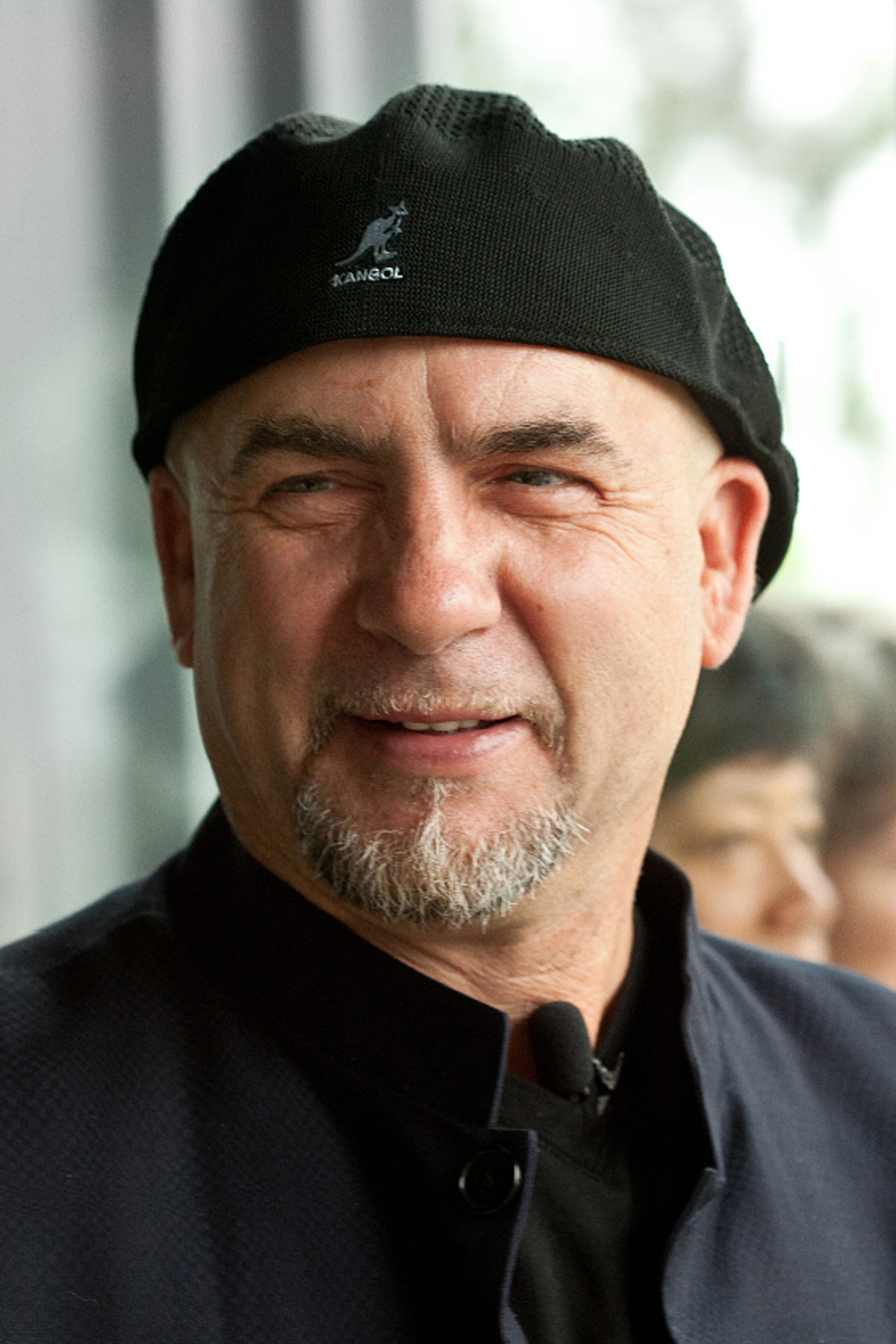
- Huether in 2010
- Born: 1959 (age 66–67); Rochester, New York
- Website: gordonhuether.com

Gordon Huether (born 1959 in Rochester, New York) is a German-American artist and CEO of Gordon Huether + Partners, Inc. (commonly known as Gordon Huether Studio or The Hay Barn) located in Napa, California, United States.

Huether studied stained glass techniques at the Pilchuck Glass School, in Stanwood, Washington. He also developed his contemporary style during a collaborative project with the German contemporary stained glass artist Johannes Schreiter.

In 2021, Huether was selected to be on the Napa Planning Commission.

== Gordon Huether Studio ==
Huether specializes in the creation of public and privately commissioned artwork, and also creates fine art. Huether's large-scale and privately commissioned work is always site-specific. During his conceptual phase, Huether conducts expansive research in order to deliver an artwork design that is unique to the specific location and connects to historical, geographical, social, economic, ethical, religious etc. characteristics.

The artist founded his professional business and art studio in 1987. The studio was initially located on Coombs Street in Napa, California. After elaborate renovations of a former hay barn on 1821 Monticello Road in Napa, the artist opened the doors to his new studio space in 2008. Gordon Huether Studio houses a gallery space, offices and a large production facility. The team at Gordon Huether Studio consists of the artist Gordon Huether, the Studio Director, a Marketing Team, a Project Development team, a Project Manager, a Public Art Administrator, a Design Team, Finance + HR, a Studio Manager and of course, a Team of artisans in charge of production. The Studio is open on weekdays to the public.

== Projects ==
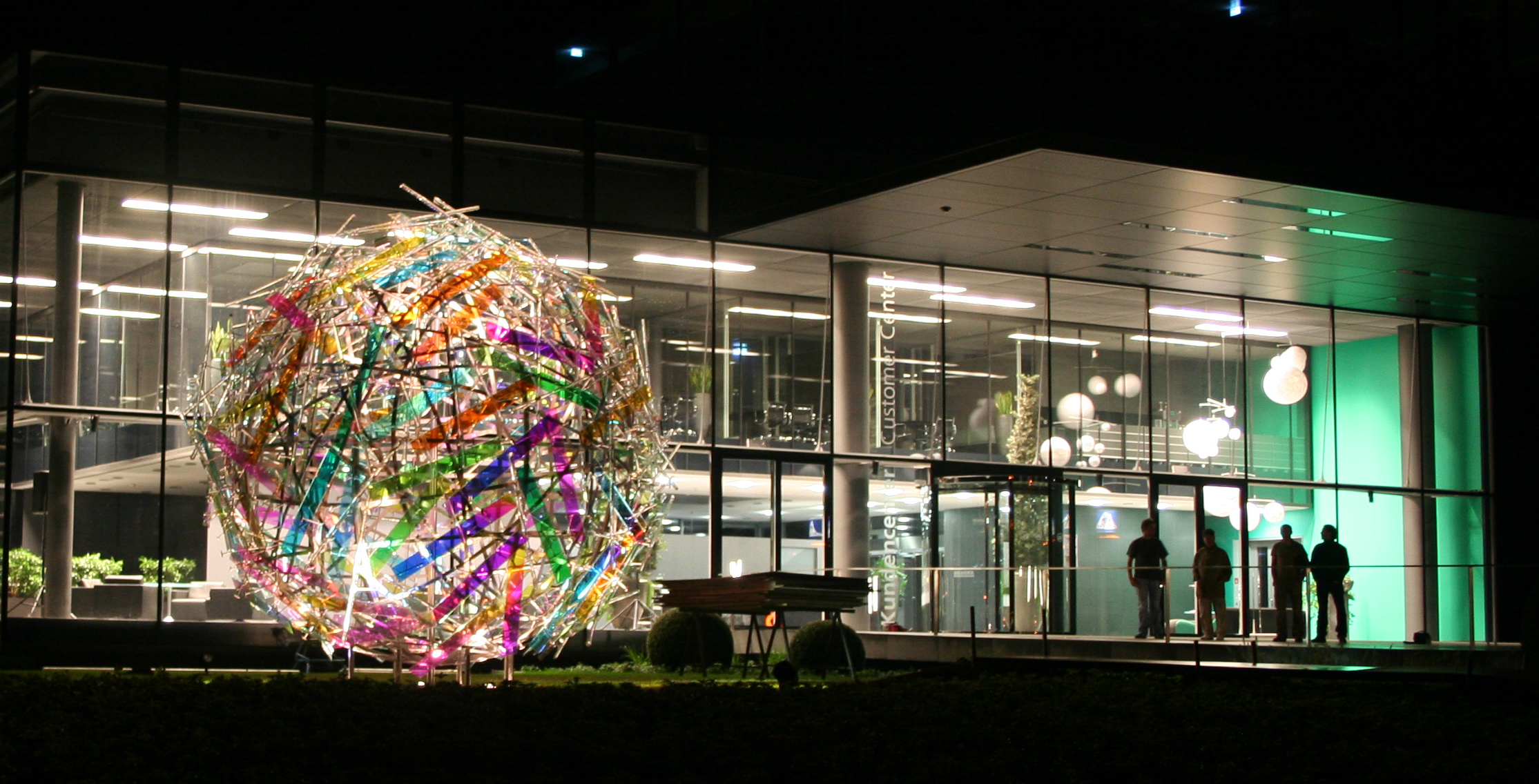
Globussphaere – Gordon Huether – 2009

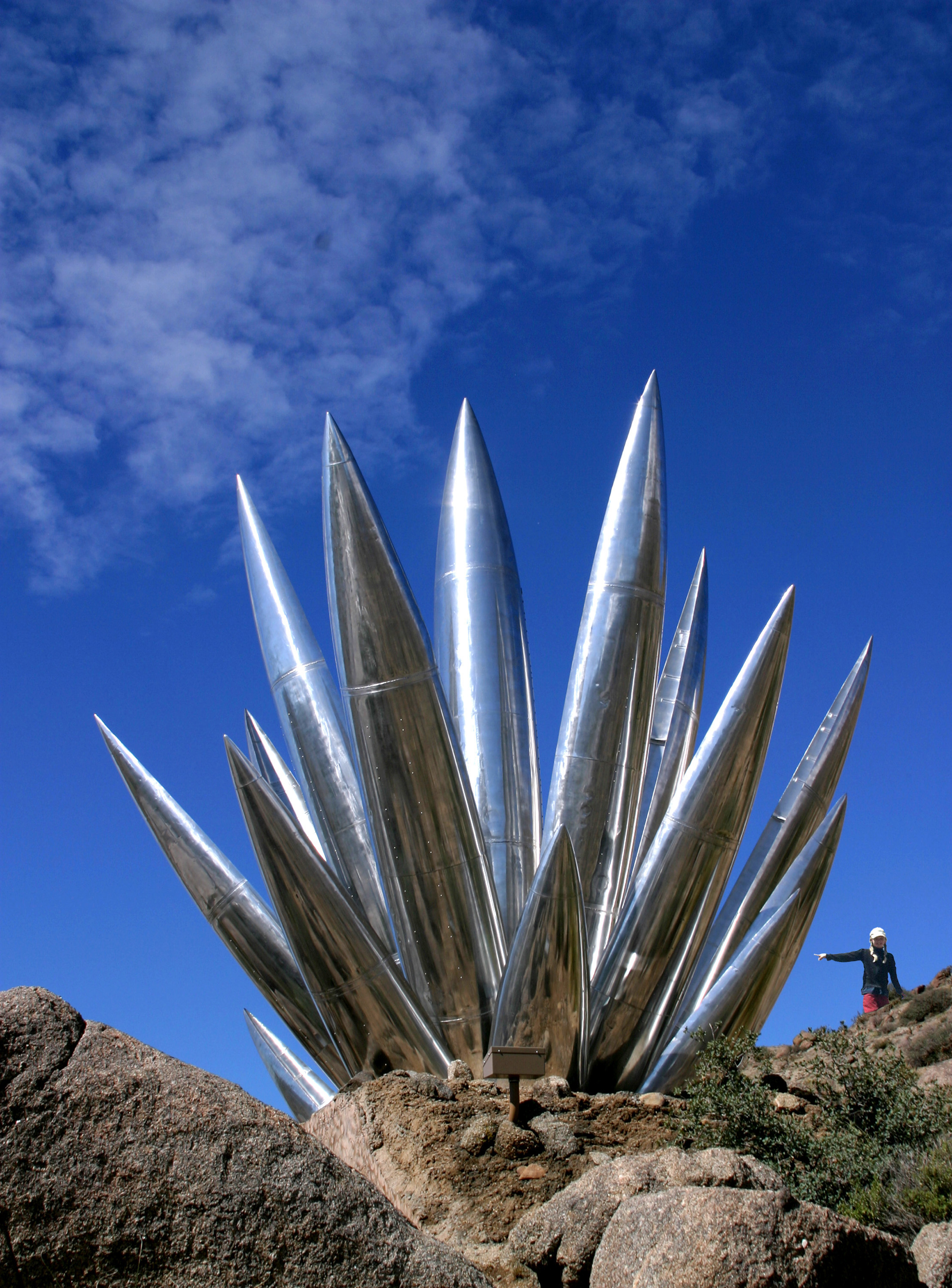
Aluminum Yucca – Gordon Huether

Huether received his very first public art commission from the University of Alaska in 1989. The artist has designed and fabricated over 165 private commissions and over 70 public art commissions worldwide. All of the concepts the artist designs are one-off creations. Huether's team oftentimes also transports and installs the artwork.

Projects include: The Lady Bird Mural at the Lyndon B. Johnson Presidential Library in Austin, Texas (2011), the Aluminum Yucca in Albuquerque, New Mexico (2003), architectural art glass window treatment for 'The Bridge North Texas', Dallas, Texas (2008), Hoops at Oregon State University's Basketball Practice Facility (2014), Globussphäre in Loßburg, Germany (2009), Pixel Care for the El Camino Hospital in Mountain View, California (2009), Lichtregen at the Archer Hotel in New York City, New York (2014), Highwire Travelers at the Raleigh-Durham International Airport, Terminal 1, Baggage Claim in Morrisville, North Carolina (2014), Parish Church St. Laurentius in Bobenheim-Roxheim, Germany (2013), A-Round Oakland at the Bay Area Rapid Transit (BART) airport connector train station in Oakland, California (2014).

In 2015, Huether was commissioned to design and fabricate several large-scale art-installations for the Terminal Redevelopment Program at the Salt Lake City International Airport in Salt Lake City, Utah. The installation of the artwork for the new airport is scheduled for 2020. (Several years prior, he had completed as smaller work, The Canyon, at the TRAX light rail station at the airport.) Later, he helped design a 1,175-foot tunnel between Concourse A and Concourse B at the airport, named the "River Tunnel". The tunnel will be completed by fall 2024.

In September 2022, Huether completed a centerpiece Hormel Foods' global headquarters in Austin, Minnesota. The 1-ton, 25-foot tall fork sculpture stands in the company's outdoor plaza. It is made up of nearly 20,000 forks.

== Residencies ==
Gordon Huether has been the permanent artist in residence at Artesa Vineyards & Winery since 1997. One of the first pieces Huether completed was a series of sculptures made from a composite of resin, fiberglass and powdered aluminum for the fountain at the vineyard's entrance. Artesa Vineyards & Winery features a rotating exhibit of Gordon Huether's sculptural and fine art work. A selection of Gordon Huether's fine art work is on display in St. Supéry Estate Vineyards & Winery's gallery space since Fall 2014.
