= Redmond Town Center =

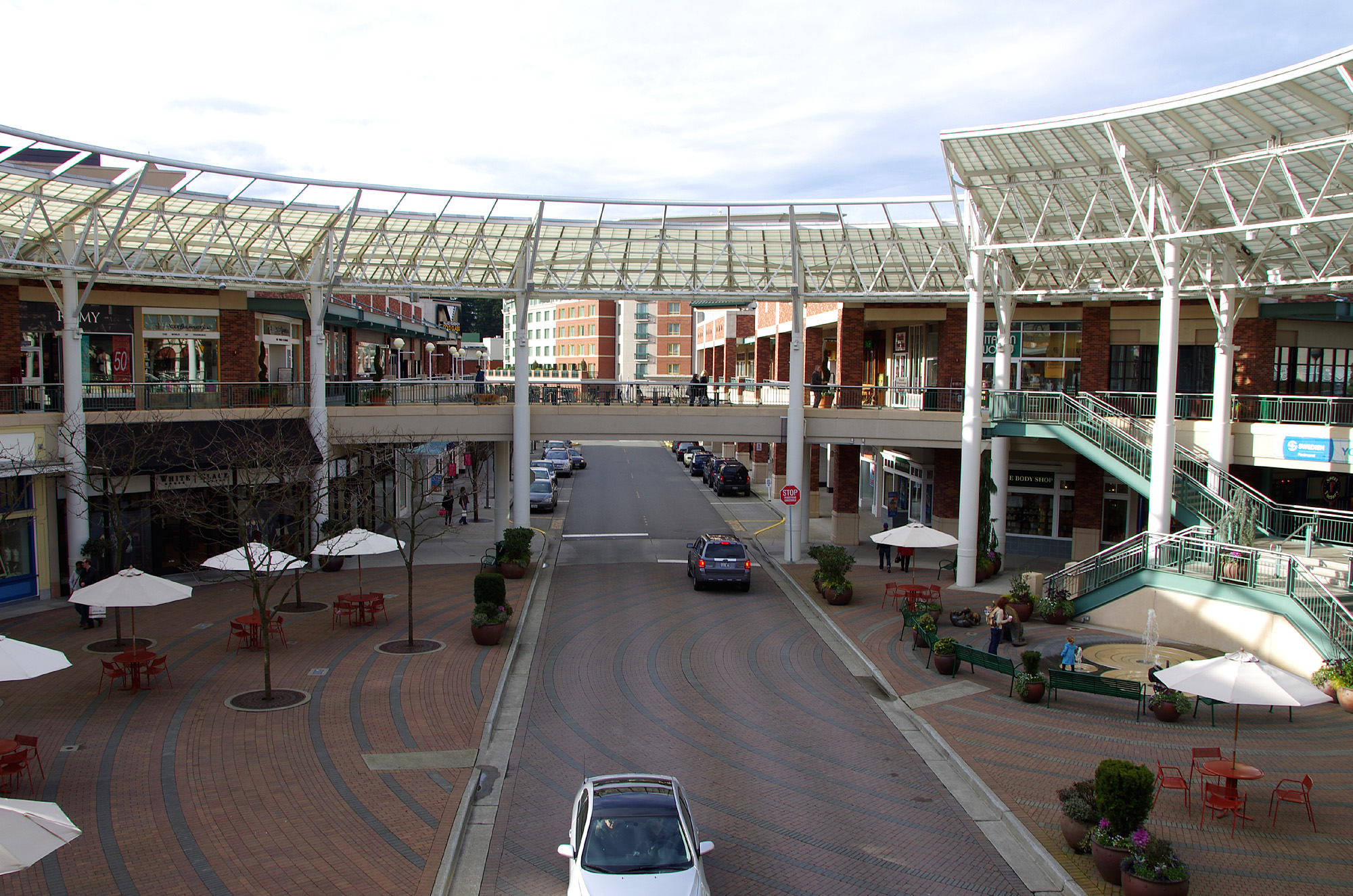
- Location: Redmond, Washington, US
- Coordinates: 47°40′13″N 122°07′13″W
- Opened: 1997
- Manager: Fairbourne Properties
- Owner: Fairbourne Properties
- Floor area: 692,000 square feet (64,300 m^{2})
- Floors: 2
- Website: redmondtowncenter.com

Redmond Town Center is a mixed-use development and shopping center in downtown Redmond, Washington. Owned and managed by Fairbourne Properties, Redmond Town Center has more than 110 shops, restaurants, lodging, and entertainment venues in an outdoor environment. It opened in 1997 on the site of a defunct municipal golf course along the north side of State Route 520.

DRA Advisors and JSH acquired the retail component of the Redmond Town Center in 2013, shortly after Shorenstein Properties bought the office portion, which Microsoft and AT&T occupy. In late 2019, the retail portion was sold to Fairbourne Properties.

== History ==
The site was formerly Redmond Golf Links, an 18-hole golf course that opened in 1932. In 1978, Winmar, a real estate company owned by Safeco Insurance., eventually closed the 120-acre property and planned to develop the site into a mixed-use shopping mall. The project, named Maingate, was planned to include 1,350,000 square feet (125,000 m^{2} ) of retail space, office spaces, 160 residential units, and 25-30 acres of open space.

This project was controversial, with some Redmond residents and city council candidates expressing concern about the proposed mall's impacts on the walkable nature of the city. In 1988, the city conditionally approved the project. Four department stores—Mervyn's, Frederick & Nelson, The Bon Marché, and JCPenney—were signed to be major tenants of Maingate, and planning continued for the project, with a construction date announced.

By 1992, Frederick & Nelson went out of business due to bankruptcy, and the owner of Bon Marché, Federated Department Stores, briefly went bankrupt. These two events caused the project to go on a downward spiral that led to the demise of the project.

However, in 1992, the City of Redmond accepted another project on the same site from the same developer, Winmar. Redmond Town Center would've included a mixed-use town center similar to Maingate, but it would have been an outdoor center, with only one department store. It included a decreased retail space, a walkable town center, hotels, offices, and residential spaces. This project was received more positively by residents and the City Council.

The development was groundbreaking in 1995. Historical buildings were kept intact while everything else on the site was demolished.

Redmond Town Center eventually opened. The complex had two floors in the retail section, directing to stores and dining. The development included 674,287 square feet (65,000 m^{2} ) of retail space, numerous office buildings, two hotels being owned by Marriott, Marriott Hotels & Resorts and Residence Inn by Marriott, and The Bon Marché, Zany Brainy, REI, Larry's Market, Borders, Todai, and Cineplex Odeon as major anchors. Microsoft, AT&T Wireless Services, and other tenants leased office spaces.

The development was built in stages, with the town center, offices, and hotels built before the Bon Marché, as construction was officially finished by 2003. Three strip malls were connected to the development, Creekside Crossing along Redmond Way, a different center featuring Larry's, Cost Plus World Market, and Big 5 Sporting Goods, and a center including Zany Brainy, Bed Bath & Beyond, and other retail tenants.

After three years of opening, Zany Brainy shuttered due to bankruptcy, and FAO Schwarz dissolved the company in December 2003. Months after closing, Petco announced that they were moving into the former space in 2004 from Bear Creek Village, a nearby shopping center, to Redmond Town Center. It later opened in 2004 in its new space.

In 2005, as The Bon Marché was acquired by Macy's, the tenant was converted into Macy's. In 2008, Larry's Market shuttered as Haggen's bought the tenant and briefly converted it into a Top Food & Drug in 2008 that closed in 2010. In 2013, the tenant was converted into a 24-Hour Fitness. In 2011, due to the company going bankrupt, Borders closed all its locations, including Redmond. It was left vacant until 2016, when it was divided into multiple tenants, one being a Ducati dealership independently owned, a T-Mobile store opening, and an office building on the second floor.

In 2010, Todai, a Japanese buffet, closed for an unknown reason. In August 2011, Haiku, another Japanese buffet, opened in its former space.

In 2012, Desert Fire, a restaurant outside Redmond Town Center adjacent to Claim Jumpers since 2010, was demolished and a BJ’s Restaurant & Brewhouse opened in its place in 2013.

In 2015, Claim Jumpers, a restaurant outside Redmond Town Center since it first opened, shuttered. Plans for a 160-room hotel and 7 stories high hotel were made with Lodgeworks, the owner of Archer Hotels. Construction started in 2016, and in 2019, the hotel opened on top of the former Claim Jumpers restaurant.

In 2016, REI moved its store from Redmond Town Center to Bellevue, selling the building it was occupying. In 2018, it was converted into Restoration Hardware before closing a few months later.

In 2018, Macy's announced that it would close around 100 locations, including the one in Redmond Town Center. In 2019, the store was shuttered. In 2020, Amazon released plans to convert the former Macy's building into an Amazon office, while a few months later, the former REI was planned to be converted into a Volkswagen automotive cloud office.

As both offices opened in 2021, in 2022, the City of Redmond and Fairbourne Properties released plans of redeveloping the town center by building more mixed-use buildings over current parking lots. These buildings would include adapting more retail, residential units, and offices to the site. They plan to turn Redmond Town Center into a walkable urban center.

Bed Bath & Beyond and Haiku both closed their locations at the town center in 2020. The mall gained an H Mart, an Asian Supermarket, that would replace the former Bed Bath & Beyond. In 2023, HobbyTown announced plans to move into the mall from a nearby building that was set to be demolished. Daiso, a variety store, announced an opening in the former Victoria's Secret and Pink space in February 2023. H Mart opened in September 2023 with a Tous les Jours bakery inside the store.

IKEA announced plans to open a small furniture pickup store at Redmond Town Center in 2025.

== Major anchors ==
- Petco (formerly Zany Brainy, 1998–2003)
- iPic Theatres (formerly Cineplex Odeon, 1997–2008)
- Mayuri Foods (formerly Pier 1 Imports, 1997–2020)
- Flatstick Pub (formerly Todai, 1997–2010; and Haiku, 2011–2022)
- Daiso (since 2023)
- H-Mart (since 2023); formerly Bed Bath & Beyond

== Former anchors ==
- Macy's, formerly The Bon Marché, 2003–2019 (now an Amazon office)
- Restoration Hardware, 2018 (formerly REI 1997–2016, now a Volkswagen office)
- Bed Bath & Beyond 1997-2020, (now H Mart and restaurant tenants)

== Hotels ==
- Redmond Marriott Town Center
- Residence Inn by Marriott
- Archer Hotels

== Office space ==
The majority of the office space at Redmond Town Center comprises six buildings of three to five stories. AT&T occupies the three on the west side of the RTC property, while Microsoft occupies the three on the east side. The administrative offices of the Lake Washington School District are housed in a smaller building to the west of the Marriott hotel. Amazon announced that it would house 600 employees at a 111,000 square feet (10,300 m^{2}) office complex at Redmond Town Center that will open in 2021 in the former Macy's.
