= Kitanda =

Restaurant chain in the U.S. state of Washington

Kitanda Espresso and Açaí

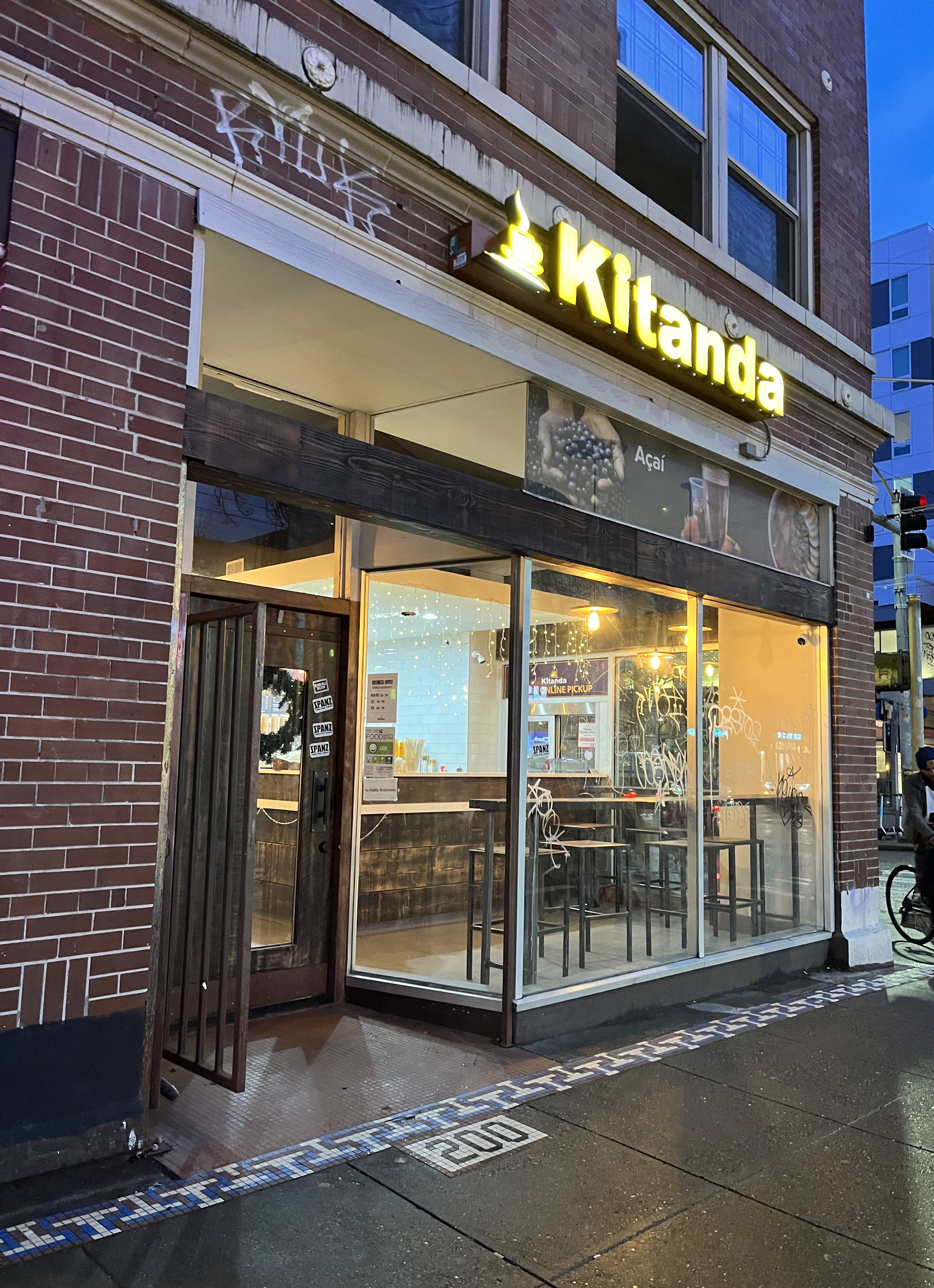
- Exterior of the location on Seattle's Capitol Hill, 2023

Restaurant information
- Established: 1998
- Food type: Brazilian; Latin
- Location: Seattle, Washington, United States
- Website: kitanda.com

Kitanda Espresso and Açaí, or simply Kitanda, is a chain of Brazilian coffee shops in the Seattle metropolitan area, in the U.S. state of Washington. João Boff opened the original shop in Seattle's University District in 1998; since then, the business has evolved and expanded to ten locations, operating in Washington and Oregon.

== Description ==
Kitanda is a family- and Latino-owned chain of Brazilian coffee shops in the Seattle metropolitan area. The business' name comes from "quitanda", which translates to "corner store" in English.

The menu has included: açaí bowls; coxinha (shredded chicken croquette); pão de queijo (gluten-free cheese bread made with tapioca flour) and other pastries; brigadeiros; and coffee drinks and smoothies. Açaí bowls are served with banana, granola, and other berries; varieties include the Traditional, the Energy Blast (strawberry, peanuts, and honey), the Super Hero (spinach, vanilla protein, and soy milk), the Tropical (coconut water, dried pineapple and mango), and the Festa (chocolate sprinkles, coconut, and condensed milk).

The cheese bread, which has been rebranded as "Kitanda bread", is prepared as a snack and as a base for a breakfast sandwich. Coffee drinks use medium-roast organic Brazilian coffee.

== History ==
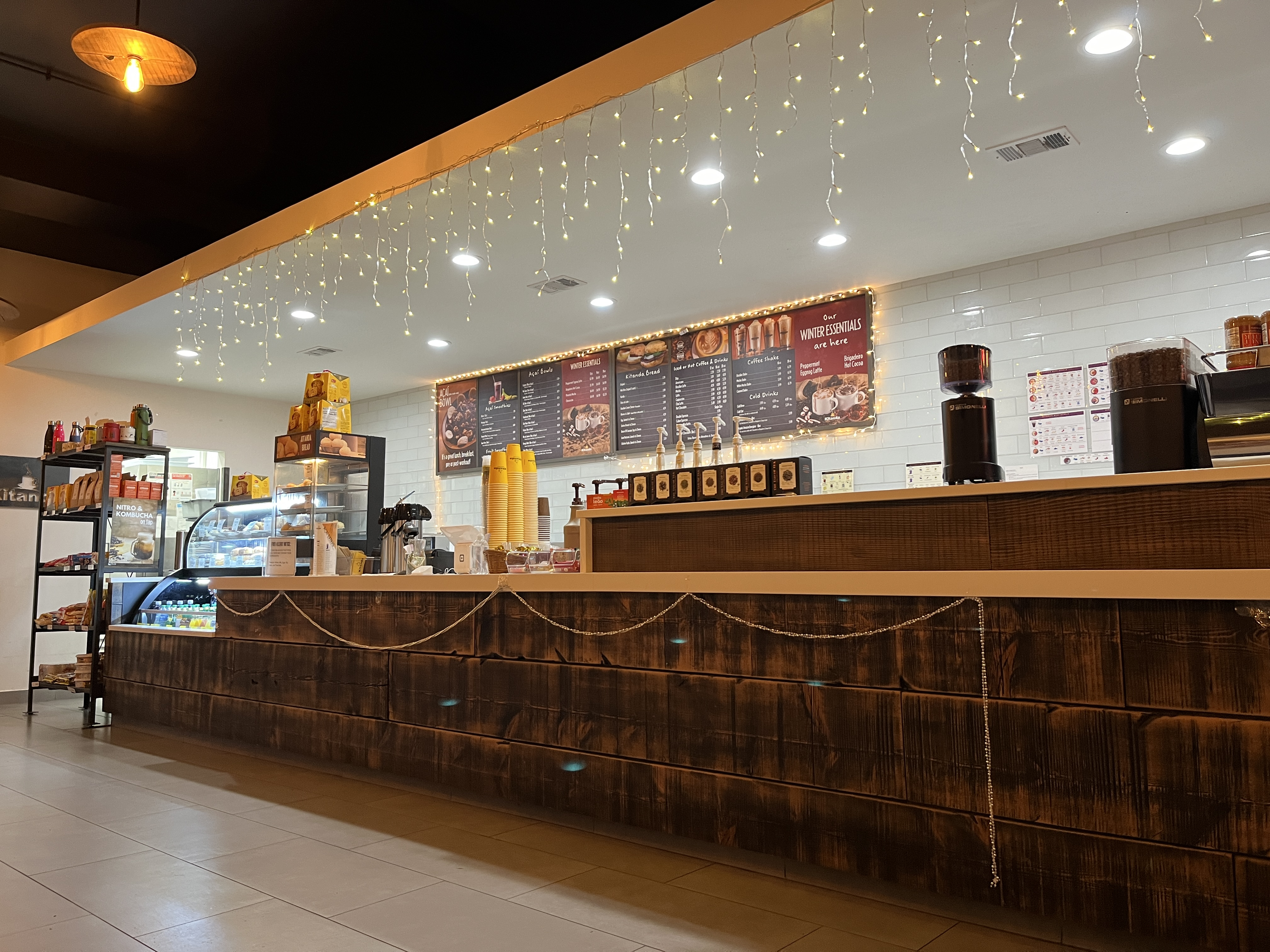
Interior of the location on Seattle's Capitol Hill in 2023

Brazil-born João Boff opened the original Kitanda as a convenience store in Seattle's University District in 1998 named Sendex. The shop initially sold Brazilian groceries and foods, as well as cassette tapes of Brazilian music. In 2002, the business relocated to Kirkland because of the city's larger Brazilian community, and became more of a bakery. At this point, the name of the business was changed to Kitanda, a name based on the Brazilian Portuguese word quitanda, meaning convenience store. Kitanda relocated to Redmond in 2013, evolving into a coffee shop chain.

Boff's stepdaughter Erica Bueno joined the family business in 2009, after relocating from Brazil to the United States. The Green Lake shop opened in 2015. As of 2019, there were five locations, in Green Lake, Kirkland, Redmond, Southcenter, and the University District. The Capitol Hill location opened in 2021. In downtown Seattle, Kitanda has operated in the McKenzie building.

== Locations ==
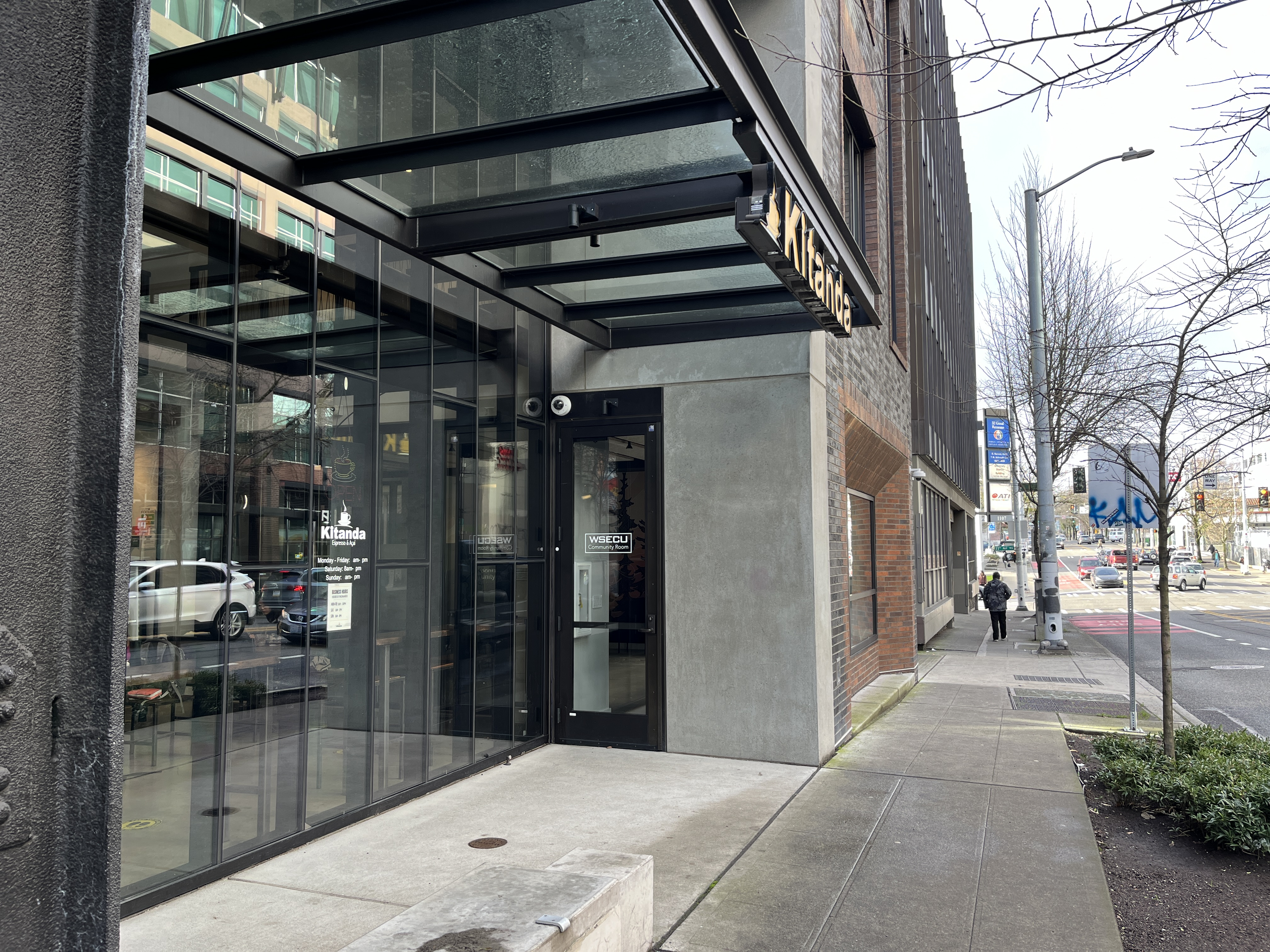
Exterior of the Kitanda on Northeast 45th, in Seattle's University District, 2024

As of 2023, Kitanda has 10 locations, all of which (except the Beaverton, Oregon location) are in the State of Washington:

- Totem Lake, Kirkland
- Redmond Town Center, Redmond
- Green Lake, Seattle
- University District, Seattle
- Capitol Hill, Seattle
- Aurora Avenue, Shoreline
- Southcenter, Tukwila
- South Lake Union, Seattle
- Beaverton, Oregon
- Alderwood Mall, Lynnwood

== Reception ==
Lori Bailey included Kitanda in Eater Seattle's 2019 list of "top spots" in Seattle for bowls and juices. The Not for Tourists Guide to Seattle has said Kitanda has "Brazilian coffee and pastries that you didn't know your life was missing".

== See also ==
- List of coffeehouse chains
- List of restaurant chains in the United States
