= Corporate responses to the Russian invasion of Ukraine =

Part of sanctions against Russia

Many private companies have ceased operations in Russia or donated or matched donations to the Ukrainian government or Ukrainian organizations in response to Russia's seizure of Ukrainian territory in 2014 and 2022. Others have applied various sanctions.

By the count of researchers at the Yale School of Management, 350 companies had withdrawn by 15 March 2022, more than 400 by 18 March, and almost 1,000 by 4 May.

== Companies suspending operations in Russia ==
| Company | Industry | Country | Suspended operations | Remaining operations in Russia |
|---|---|---|---|---|
| 3M | Conglomerate | United States | Suspended all of its business operations in Russia, where it operates at least one factory. | |
| Accenture | Consulting | Ireland/United States | Closed business in Russia | |
| Acer | Computer hardware | Taiwan | Suspended product sales in Russia | |
| Accor | Hospitality | France | Halted all services to hotels whose owners are under U.S. or European sanctions as well abandoned expansion plans in Russia | Accor has more than 50 hotels in Russia and continues to operate in the country in support of its 3,500 employees |
| Activision Blizzard | Video game | United States | Suspended "new sales of and in our games" | |
| Advanced Micro Devices | Semiconductor company | United States | Chip sales to Russia | |
| Adidas | Clothing | Germany | Suspended partnership with Russian Football Union Temporarily closed its stores and e-commerce operations in Russia. | |
| AerCap | Aircraft leasing | Ireland | Ceased lending to Russians | |
| airBaltic | Airline | Latvia | Cancelled all flights to and from Russia until further notice | |
| Airbnb | Online marketplace | United States | Suspended all operations in Russia and Belarus Offered free, short-term housing to up to 100,000 refugees fleeing Ukraine | |
| Airbus | Aerospace manufacturer | France | Stopped providing support services to Russian Airlines Continues to purchase titanium from the Russian Federation | |
| Air France-KLM | Airline | France | Stopped flights to Russia | |
| Alaska Airlines | Airline | United States | Suspended Russian partnerships | |
| Alcoa | Metals | United States | Suspended all business with Russia | |
| Allianz | Financial services | Germany | Curtailed Russian access to capital markets. In June 2022, Allianz sold a 50.1% stake in its Russian operations to Interholding. | |
| Alstom | Rail transport manufacturer | France | Suspended all deliveries to Russia and any future investment in Russia. | |
| Amadeus IT Group | Software | Spain | Distribution service with Russia's Aeroflot and new planned commercial projects in Russia halted | |
| Amazon | Internet | United States | Amazon's cloud computing business, Amazon Web Services (AWS), is no longer accepting new customers based in Russia or Belarus. "Unlike some other US technology providers, Amazon and AWS have no data centres, infrastructure or offices in Russia, and we have a longstanding policy of not doing business with the Russian government". | Ukraine's vice prime minister, Mykhailo Fedorov, had appealed to Amazon executive chair Jeff Bezos to suspend the provision of all AWS services in Russia. AWS is not fully suspended in Russia. |
| Amber Grid | Natural gas transmission | Lithuania | Abandoned all Russian natural gas imports. | |
| American Airlines | Airlines | United States | Severed all ties with Aeroflot and S7 Airlines and suspended interline agreements. | |
| American Express | Payment card services | United States | Suspended all operations in Russia and Belarus | |
| AmerisourceBergen | Healthcare | United States | Operations in Ukraine and new business initiatives in Russia are currently suspended. | Provision of limited logistical support of pharmaceutical products and of the existing clinical trial programs has continued |
| Amway | Direct selling | United States | | |
| Anheuser-Busch | Brewing | United States | Halted all shipments to Russia | |
| Apple | Computer hardware and software | United States | Halted all product sales: App Store, Apple Developer, Apple Pay; Apple Maps have been limited. | Continues sales through official resellers |
| Arconic | Industrials | United States | Pause New Contracts in Russia | Arconic Samara Metallurgical Plant – known as Arconic SMZ – has been in operation since 1960 and is one of Russia's largest producers of fabricated aluminum. |
| Asda | Retail | UK | Remove products from Russia | |
| ASOS | Online retail | UK | Retail sales stopped | |
| Assicurazioni Generali | Insurance | Italy | Exit Russia completely | |
| Aston Martin | Luxury sports cars and grand tourers | UK | Retail | |
| Asus | Electronics | Taiwan | Asus stated that its shipments to Russia are at an "effective standstill". Furthermore, the company will donate $1.05 million to the Taiwanese relief agency which is in charge of humanitarian donations for Ukraine, it said. | |
| AT&T | Telecommunications | United States | Announced calls between Ukraine and anywhere else in the world would be free of charge | |
| Atlas Copco | Industrial equipment | Sweden | Halt all shipments to Russia | |
| Atlassian | Software | Australia | Pauses sales in Russia and suspends licenses state-owned or held by companies supporting the war | |
| Auchan | Retail | France | | Russia has the most Auchan supermarkets and hypermarkets outside France and is estimated to contribute one fifth of yearly group revenues, about € 5bn–6bn. Managers in Russia deny company closing stores. |
| Autodesk | Software | United States | Business in Russia | |
| Avid Technology | Technology | United States | All sales and support for all customers, users and resellers in Russia and Belarus | |
| Bain | | United States | Suspend consulting for all Russian govt entities | |
| Baker McKenzie | Law | Switzerland | Suspend services for all Kremlin entities | |
| Balenciaga | Luxury fashion | France | Russian revenue streams | |
| BASF | Chemicals | Germany | BASF suspended new activities in Russia and Belarus. | BASF continues existing activities, in accordance with international sanctions. |
| Bayer | Chemicals | Germany | CEO stated "Bayer will closely monitor and mitigate these risks to the extent possible". Bayer committed to financially assisting Ukrainian employees with funds and housing. In a statement, CEP Werner Baumann deemed the invasion "a threat to our freedom and democracy, and we at Bayer condemn in the most vigorous way, this Russian attack." | |
| BBC | Broadcast | UK | BBC Studios suspended the licensing of programming to Russian customers. | The BBC introduced two new shortwave radio frequencies for Russia and Ukraine (15735 kHz and 5875 kHz), in response to Russian state media and censorship. |
| Bentley | Luxury cars | UK | Halts exports to Russia | |
| Binance | Crypto exchange | Canada | Binance says will not accept cards of sanctioned Russian banks | CEO resisted calls to curtail operations in Russia |
| BlackRock | Financial services | United States | Curtail Russian access to capital markets | |
| Bloomberg | | United States | Pull back journalists from Russia | |
| BMW | Luxury vehicles and motorcycles | Germany | Stopped car production in Russia and halts exports to Russia. | |
| BNP Paribas | Banking | France | Curtail Russian access to capital markets | While BNP Paribas took many actions to help Ukraine, it did not pull out of Russia. Many of these were organized by local (e.g. Polish) offices. |
| Boeing | Aviation, spaceflight and telecommunications | United States | Suspended parts and maintenance support for Russian airlines as well as its operations in Moscow Suspended purchases of titanium from Russia | |
| Bolt | Vehicle for hire, micromobility, car-sharing, and food delivery services | Estonia | Ties with Russian companies | |
| Bombardier | Aircraft | Canada | Restrict new Russian business | |
| BooHoo Group | Online fashion retail | UK | Boohoo Group, which comprises Boohoo, PrettyLittleThing. Burton and Debenhams, has suspended sales in Russia | |
| Booking.com | Travel | Netherlands | Operations in Russia | |
| Boston Consulting Group | Consulting | United States | Won't take on any new work in Russia | "our contractual obligations, we have already started to wind down work where possible" |
| BP | Oil and gas | UK | Abandoned stake in Russian oil giant Rosneft. | |
| Bridgestone | Tyres | Japan | "The major Japanese tire-maker said it will suspend production at its passenger car tire plant in Ulyanovsk in western Russia from Friday [March 25th] and freeze all new capital investment." | |
| British American Tobacco | Tobacco | UK | Suspended all its planned capital investment in the country. On March 11, 2022, company said it would exit Russia and cut its fiscal 2022 guidance as a result | |
| British Land | Real estate | UK | Plans to end lease agreement with Gazprom in central London. Gazprom Marketing & Trading (GM&T) had occupied the top floors of 20 Triton Street in Regent's Park. | |
| Budvar | Brewing | United States | Halt all shipments to Russia | |
| Bumble | Internet | United States | Discontinued operations in Russia and Belarus and removed its applications form the Apple App Store and Google Play Store in Russia and Belarus. | |
| Burberry | Retail | UK | Halt all shipments to Russia | |
| Cadillac | Automobile manufacture | United States | Business to Russia | |
| Canada Goose | Clothing | Canada | Halt all shipments to Russia | |
| Cannes Festival | Film festival | France | Ban Russian Delegations | |
| Canonical | Software | UK | Halt support, professional services and partnerships with Russian enterprises | Continues to provide security patches to Russian customers |
| Cargill | Food and agriculture | United States | Scaled back business operations and stopped further investments in Russia. | Cargill will continue operations in Russia. |
| Carlsberg | Brewer | Denmark | Exports, New Investments Into Russia | |
| Carnival | Cruise | United States | Along with its parent company Carnival Corporation announced all Russian tours would be cancelled, and that the company would severely limit dealings with Russian business entities. | |
| Cartier | Luxury goods | France | Operations in Russia | |
| CBC | Broadcast | Canada | Suspended all reporting and pulled all journalists. Russia withdrew visas and accreditation; closed Moscow bureau. | |
| Chanel | Luxury goods | France | Sales in Russia | |
| Chevrolet | Automobile | United States | Vehicle exports to Russia | |
| Chevron | Oil and gas | United States | Limited business operations in Russia compared to many other large energy companies | |
| Cido Grupa | Beverages | Latvia | Stopped all exports to Russia and Belarus | |
| Cisco | Technology | United States | All business operations | While Cisco claims that it has suspended "all business operations" in Russia, reports have emerged that Cisco still does business in Russia through intermediaries. |
| Citigroup | Financials | United States | | operating Russia consumer business on 'more limited basis' |
| Cloudflare | Internet | United States | | Cloudflare has "received several calls to terminate all of Cloudflare's services inside Russia". Cloudflare has "carefully considered these requests and discussed them with government and civil society experts", but ultimately decided against terminating Russia operations. |
| CMA CGM | Shipping | France | Halt all shipments to Russia | |
| Coca-Cola Company | Beverages | United States | Suspended business in Russia | Rebranding Coca-Cola, Fanta and Sprite products into Dobry Cola, Dobry Orange, Dobry Lemon-Lime. Rebranding Schweppes products to Rich. Production in the same factories as the original products. |
| Cogent Communications | | United States | Cut all internet to Russia | |
| Consumer Technology Association | Trade organization | United States | Ban Russian exhibitors from the Consumer Electronics Show | |
| Coinbase | Cryptocurrency exchange | United States | Blocked 25,000 cryptocurrency wallet addresses related to Russia, believing them to have engaged in illicit activity. | Coinbase said that it would "not institute a blanket ban on all Coinbase transactions involving Russian addresses". |
| Continental AG | Automotive | Germany | | Continental "resumed tyre production for passenger cars at its Russian plant in Kaluga", in stark contrast to their competitors. |
| Coty | Consumer goods | United States/France | | Coty did not respond to an AFP request for comment |
| Coursera | Online course provider | United States | All content from Russian university and industry partners including courses, Further business with Russian institutions across Coursera for Business, Coursera for Government, and Coursera for Campus, The ability for learners in Russia to enroll in paid course experiences, Collecting payment from any learners or institutions in Russia, | |
| Credit Suisse | Financial services | Switzerland | Curtail Russian access to capital markets | "Reports emerged that Credit Suisse contacted hedge fund managers and other investors asking them to "destroy and permanently erase" evidence linking the Swiss bank to loans issued to U.S.-sanctioned Russian oligarchs for luxury items including yachts and private jets." The bank just revealed it has given $1.7 billion to the Russian borrowers |
| Crunchyroll | Anime | United States | Jointly owned by Japanese conglomerate Sony, through its subsidiaries Sony Pictures Television and Aniplex.; Services from Wakanim and Crunchyroll EMEA are suspended from Russia. | |
| Daimler Truck | Commercial vehicle manufacturer | Germany | Exports to Russia and production in Russia | |
| Danone | Food | France | Company would "suspend investments in Russia" | About 6% of Danone's sales come from Russia and Ukraine, combined. Danone has more than a dozen factories in Russia and continues operations in Russia |
| Dassault Aviation | Aircraft | France | Falcon deliveries | |
| David Chipperfield Architects | Architecture | UK | Working on their projects in Russia | |
| DB Schenker | Logistics | Germany | Halt all shipments to Russia | |
| Deezer | Music streaming | France | Subscription in Russia | |
| Dell | Computer hardware | United States | Suspended product sales in Russia | |
| Deloitte | Professional services network | UK | Separated practices in Russia and Belarus from the global network of member firms as of March 8, 2022. Deloitte Global CEO Punit Renjen said "While we know this is the right decision, it will have an impact on Deloitte's ~3,000 professionals located in Russia and Belarus. We know our colleagues in Russia and Belarus have no voice in the actions of their government. We will support all impacted colleagues during this transition and do all we can to assist them during this extremely difficult time." | |
| Delta Air Lines | Airlines | United States | Suspend agreement with Aeroflot | |
| Dentons | Law | Multinational | Suspend services for all Kremlin entities | |
| Deutsche Bank | Banking | Germany | On March 11, 2022, Deutsche Bank reverses course on Russia, says it is unwinding business | Deutsche Bank's CFO said it is not "practical" to close its Russia business |
| DHL | Logistics | Germany | Deliveries to Russia | |
| Diageo | Alcoholic beverages | UK | Halt all shipments to Russia | |
| DirecTV | Communications | United States | Cut Kremlin backed TV networks | |
| Disney | Entertainment and media | United States | Pause all theatrical releases in Russia | |
| DJI | Electronics | China | Temporarily halted all shipments and business to both Russia and Ukraine | |
| DSV A/S | | | Halt all shipments to Russia | |
| DXC Technology | Technology | United States | Exit the Russian market | |
| eBay | Internet | United States | Suspended the delivery of orders to Russia and Ukraine from March 3 | |
| ECCO | Fashion | Denmark | Ecco has stated that it will not expand business in Russia. | Other than not expanding business, Ecco has refused to exit the Russian market, as "[Russian employees] and their families are also going through a difficult time". Ecco loses its Royal Warrant as of April 16, 2023. |
| Electronic Arts | Video games | United States | Halts all product sales in Russia and Belarus Exclude Russia from FIFA 22 and NHL 22 | |
| Eni | Energy | Italy | Announced that it would withdraw from the Blue Stream gas pipeline linking Russia to Turkey, in which it has a 50% stake. | |
| Equinor | Energy | Norway | Exit joint ventures in Russia | |
| Ericsson | Networking and telecommunications | Sweden | Suspended deliveries to Russia | |
| Ernst & Young | Professional services network | UK | Separating Russia operations | |
| Estée Lauder | Consumer products | United States | Initially suspended the company's business investments and initiatives in Russia. On March 7, 2022, company announced they have also decided to suspend all commercial activity in the country, closing every store they own and operate including their brand sites as well as ceasing shipments to any of their retailers in Russia. | |
| Etsy | E-commerce | United States | Cancelled all balances owed by sellers in Ukraine on its platform, totalling almost $4 million in listing fees | |
| Eurovision | Song contest | (Europe) European Countries | Banned Russia from competing | |
| Eutelsat | Communications | (France) | | Eutelsat keeps operating terminals in Russia and partnerships with Russian pay-TV operators, even though they "could" turn them off. About 6% of Eutelsat's 1.2B EUR FY2021 revenues come from Russia As of April 8, Eutelsat keeps operating a range of telecommunication solutions in Russia, "reaching over 50% of homes". |
| Expedia | Online travel | United States | Ceased sales to and from Russia | |
| ExxonMobil | Oil and gas | United States | Announced it was pulling out of Sakhalin-I, its only Russian investment, and further announced it would temporarily halt all further investments into the Russian Federation. ExxonMobil is currently litigating against the Russian Government regarding its pullout of Sakhalin-I. | The company publicly announced it was complying with all sanctions against Russia |
| EPAM Systems | Technology | United States | First announced it would stop providing services to customers in Russia, then an end to all operations in Russia | |
| Facebook | Networking service | United States | Banned the Russian state media channels | Banned in Russia, in response to Meta allowing Ukrainian citizens to condemn Russian politicians and soldiers in its websites. |
| Farfetch | eCommerce | | Halt all shipments to Russia | |
| Fast Retailing | Clothing | Japan | Temporarily stop sales at all stores. Brand Uniqlo | |
| Fazer | Food industry | Finland | Export to Russia | |
| FedEx | Transportation | United States | Halted all shipments to both Ukraine and Russia upon the invasion | |
| Ferrari | Manufacturer of sports cars | Italy | Suspended businesses with Russia | |
| Ferrero | Multinational food manufacturer | Italy | Ferrero has been present in the Russian market since 1995 | Company yet to release a statement |
| FIFA and UEFA | Sport | Worldwide | Suspend Russia from international football and moved the UEFA Champions League final from Saint Petersburg to Paris | |
| Fiskars | Consumer goods | Finland | Decided to withdraw completely from the Russian market. | |
| Ford | Automotive | United States | Suspends business in Russia, provides aid to Ukrainians | |
| Formula One | Sport | Worldwide | Prohibition to compete under the flag of Russia | |
| Games Workshop | Entertainment | UK | Sales in Russia and Belarus suspended | |
| General Electric | | United States | Halt supply of parts to Aeroflot | |
| General Motors | Automotive | United States | Suspending its business in Russia | |
| Geodis | | | Halt all shipments to Russia | |
| GitHub | Software | Worldwide | | "We are continuing to ensure free open source services are available to all, including developers in Russia" |
| GitLab | Software | Worldwide | Suspended new business in Russia and Belarus | |
| GlobalFoundries | | | Halt all shipments to Russia | |
| Globecast | Networking | France | | Ukrainian Vice Prime Minister has asked Globelcast to suspend their services in Russia. Globecast has not made a public statement regarding the conflict in Ukraine. Globecast has even restricted replies to their social media posts on Twitter as many people were posting letters asking the company to suspend their services. |
| Globus | Department store | Switzerland | Terminated the import and selling of Russian goods | |
| Goldman Sachs | Investment bank | United States | All operations in Russia | |
| Google | Internet | United States | Initiated a widespread blocking of Russian state media sources from advertising on their sites as well as freezing ad revenue for Russian state media YouTube channels In an effort to prevent Ukrainian armed forces and civilians from being tracked on public platforms, Google also disabled tools in Google Maps relating to live traffic. Google suspends Play Store billing and YouTube payments in Russia Some Russian bank customers barred from using Google Pay or AdSense | Google Russia filed for bankruptcy, but will keep its free services (such as YouTube and Google Search) available. |
| Grammarly | Software | United States | Service in Russia and Belarus | |
| Grant Thornton | | UK | Closing business in Russia | |
| Harley Davidson | Motorcycle manufacture | United States | Business in Russia | |
| Heineken | Brewing | Netherlands | Beer exports and investment projects in Russia | |
| Henkel | Chemical and consumer goods | Germany | Investments in Russia | |
| Herbalife | Nutrition products | United States | Suspended operations in Russia in all 62 sales centers and stopped shipping products to the country | |
| Hermès | Luxury goods | France | Suspended its activities in Russia | |
| Hewlett Packard Enterprise | Computer hardware | United States | Halted operations and contracts in Russia and Ukraine. | |
| Hitachi | Manufacturing and engineering | Japan | Hitachi has declared it is "temporarily pausing production" at its Russia facilities as well as halting all exports. | Hitachi will "continue to provide products, services and support for electrical power equipment that is deemed 'essential' to citizens' daily lives". 50% of Hitachi's Russian 2021 revenue came from construction machinery. |
| Hilton Worldwide | Hospitality | United States | Pausing new Russian projects and investment in response to the war closed its Moscow corporate office and donate any Hilton profits from business operations in Russia to the humanitarian relief efforts for Ukraine | 26 hotels in Russia that are all managed or franchised |
| H&M | Clothing | Sweden | Temporarily suspending all of its Russian operations | |
| Honda | Automotive | Japan | Exports of cars and motorcycles to Russia | |
| Hapag-Lloyd | Shipping | Germany | Halt all shipments to Russia | |
| HMM | shipping | South Korea | Halt all shipments to Russia | |
| Honeywell | Conglomerate | United States | Suspended business in Russia and Belarus | |
| HP | Computer hardware | United States | Suspended product shipments to Russia. | |
| HSBC | Banking | UK | Curtail Russian access to capital markets | |
| Hyatt | Hospitality | United States | Pausing new Russian projects and investment in response to the war | Hyatt operates five hotels in Russia, but owns none of them |
| Hyundai | Automotive | South Korea | Production at its St Petersburg plant in Russia due to the global components shortage and had "nothing to do with Russia's invasion of Ukraine or Western economic sanctions" | Hyundai operates the Hyundai Motor Manufacturing Rus factories in Sestroretsk as well as in Saint Petersburg, Russia. Company did not comment on the matter |
| IBM | Technology | United States | All operations in Russia | According to Mykhailo Fedorov, adviser to Ukrainian President, IBM continues to provide consultancy services in Russia. |
| IKEA | Retail | Sweden | Suspended its 17 stores in Russia and halted its sourcing in Russia and Belarus. Ingka Group has taken the decision to pause all IKEA Retail operations in Russia. The company controls 392 IKEA stores across 32 markets. | |
| Inditex | Retail | Spain | Temporarily suspended its activity in the 502 stores and on the country's online channel Brands: Zara Home, Bershka, Massimo Dutti, Oysho, Pull&Bear, Stradivarius, Uterqüe, Lefties | |
| Infosys | Consulting | India | | Infosys operates their Moscow office and has remained silent on the issue of Russian invasion and according to The Register have not responded to requests for comment. This contrasts with its peer companies (e.g. Accenture, KPMG, PwC, DXC) who have all quit Russia. The Guardian states that "Infosys has strong historical links with Russia and Putin" and a market value of about $100bn. |
| ING Group | Banking | Netherlands | Stopped accepting new Russian customers | Existing Russian customers will continue to be able to get loans |
| Intercontinental Exchange | | United States | Curtail Russian access to capital markets | |
| International Paralympic Committee | Disabled sporting events | Germany | Athletes from Russia and Belarus were banned entirely from the 2022 Winter Paralympics in Beijing, China. | |
| International Red Cross | NGO / Humanitarian organization | Switzerland | | After Red Cross head Peter Maurer met the Russian minister of foreign affairs Sergei Lavrov, it was announced that the International Red Cross and Red Crescent Movement will open a new office in Russia. "I would like to get your support in strengthening the logistics structure in Russia in order to improve our work in the Donbas and other parts of Ukraine under control of the Russian armed forces," Peter Maurer said. He thanked Lavrov for longstanding "positive cooperation" with Russia in various parts of the world, including in the Middle East, Afghanistan, Nagorno-Karabakh, and Ukraine, and voiced hope that this will continue. |
| Interpol | International Organization | UN | | "Interpol has no plans to exclude Russia". This move was widely criticised by Western governments, who have accused Russia of using the organization to arrest Russian critics outside of Russia. |
| Instagram | Social media | United States | Demoting posts from Russian state-media | Banned in Russia, in response to Meta allowing Ukrainian citizens to condemn Russian politicians and soldiers in its websites. |
| Intel | Technology | United States | Chip sales to Russia | |
| Imperial Brands | Tobacco | UK | Halted production, sales and marketing of its products in Russia. | |
| Jaguar Land Rover | Automotive | UK | Deliveries of Russia-bound vehicles | |
| Japan Tobacco | Tobacco | Japan | Suspend 'some' operations in Russia. Company announced that effective immediately, its subsidiary, JTI, will suspend all new investments and marketing activities Temporarily suspended operations at its plant in Ukraine | Japan Tobacco had a 37% share of the Russian market as of December 2021 and has 4,500 employees across Russia at 70 offices and five factories. |
| JD Sports | Retail | UK | Suspend operations in Russia | |
| JetBrains | Software | Czechia | Suspending sales and R&D activities in Russia | |
| Johnson & Johnson | FMCG | United States | Donating $5 million to support the work of the International Rescue Committee (IRC) and International Federation Red Cross and Red Crescent to provide humanitarian support for refugees in the border countries. Providing product donations including hygiene kits, health packets and medical supplies. | Will continue "providing access to our essential medical products in the countries where we operate". |
| Jooble | WEB | Ukraine | Operation in Russia and Belarus | |
| JPMorgan Chase | Banking | United States | Curtail Russian access to capital markets | |
| Jysk | Retail chain | Denmark | Closed their stores in Russia | |
| Kellogg's | Food | United States | Shipments and investments in Russia. | Staple foods in Russia. |
| Kemira | Chemicals | Finland | Discontinued deliveries to Russia and Belarus, primarily impacting pulp and paper customers in Russia. | |
| Kering | Luxury goods | France | All product sales across brands Balenciaga, Bottega Veneta, Gucci, Alexander McQueen, Yves Saint Laurent | |
| Kia | Automobile manufacturer | South Korea | | Kia Group Won't Stop Exports Or Production In Russia – For Now |
| Kinross Gold | | Canada | Suspend operations in Russia | |
| Kimberly-Clark | Personal care | United States | Halted capital spending and advertising in Russia. | Kimberly-Clark would continue producing and selling products in Russia, such as Huggies. |
| Kone | Industrial | Finland | Sale of Russian subsidiary to local management; the Kone brand is not included in the deal; after sale, Kone will leave Russia | |
| Korean Air | Airline | South Korea | No flying over Russian airspace | |
| KPMG | Professional services network | Netherlands | Separating Russia operations | |
| Kuehne + Nagel | Logistics | Switzerland | Suspend all shipments to Russia | |
| Kytary | eCommerce | Czechia | Suspended all business contacts with Russian suppliers | |
| Lamborghini | Manufacturer of sports cars | Italy | Suspended businesses with Russia. | |
| Latvijas Balzams | Alcoholic beverages | Latvia | Rebranded its signature vodka to just Stoli, and changed the source of the ingredients from Russia to Slovakia. | |
| Lego | Toys | Denmark | Stopped deliveries of their products to Russia Lego does not own stores in the country; 81 Russian Lego stores are owned and run by the local Inventive Retail Group, but they will not receive further shipments. | Inventive Retail Group renames the stores "Мир Кубиков" (Mir Kubikov) and parallel imports the stock via a third country. |
| Leroy Merlin | Retail | France | | Company operates 112 stores in Russia and does not plan to make any changes |
| Levi Strauss & Co | Clothing | United States | Commercial operations in Russia | Resumed operations after rebranding to JNS brand. |
| LG Electronics | Electronics | South Korea | | Korea is seeking exemptions from the US to avoid its key export items being banned from shipping to Russia Company did not say whether the company would change its business practices in Russia. |
| Life:) | Communications | Ukraine | | |
| Linklaters | | UK | Suspend operations in Russia | |
| Live Nation Entertainment | Entertainment | United States | Halt all operations in Russia | |
| London Stock Exchange Group | | UK | Curtail Russian access to capital markets | |
| Lumen Technologies | | United States | Suspend new Russian relationships | |
| LVMH | Luxury goods | France | Temporarily stop sales at all stores. Brands Moët & Chandon, Hennessy, Louis Vuitton, Givenchy, Christian Dior, Kenzo, Bulgari, Marc Jacobs, Stella McCartney, Loewe, Fendi | |
| Mango | Retail | Spain | Spanish retailer Mango closed all its 126 shops in Russia. | |
| Marks & Spencer | Retail | UK | Stopped shipments to Turkish franchisee's Russian business | The 48 shops (with 1,200 employees) remain open and continue to sell their existing stock. |
| Mastercard | Banking | United States | Cards issued by Russian banks will no longer be supported by the Mastercard network regardless of where they're used - inside or outside of Russia. And, any Mastercard issued outside of the country will not work at Russian merchants or ATMs Pledged $2 million toward humanitarian relief funds for Ukraine. | |
| Mazda | Automotive Manufacturing | Japan | Halt all shipments to Russia | |
| Maersk | Shipping | Denmark | Deliveries | |
| McCain Foods | Frozen food | Canada | Scrapped construction of potato plant. Halted all deliveries to Russia. | |
| McDonald's | Fast food | United States | Owns the vast majority of the 847 McDonald's stores in Russia, but the company did not offer an official position on operations in the Russian Federation. McDonald's offered food assistance to Ukrainians. McDonald's to close 850 restaurants | Reopened without McDonald's brand, business sold to Vkusno i tochka, restaurants can be bought back within 15 years. |
| McKinsey & Company | Management consulting | Worldwide | Business with any government entity in Russia | |
| MSC | Shipping line | Switzerland | Halts all shipments to Russia | |
| MSC Cruises | Cruise line | Switzerland | Suspends travels and stops to Russia | |
| Mercedes-Benz Group | Vehicle manufacturer | Germany | Halts exports to Russia and cease manufacturing there until further notice | |
| Meta | Technology | United States | Halted advertising sales to Russian state media, such as RT On March 11, 2022, Meta announced that Facebook will permit some calls for violence against Vladimir Putin and Russian soldiers | |
| Metro AG | Retail | Germany | 3,400 employees in Ukraine were making "enormous efforts" to keep its 26 stores open in the country, with each store opening decided daily by local management based on the security situation. | Company operates 93 stores employing around 10,000 people in Russia. Metro AG said that it isn't planning to withdraw from Russia Metro spokesperson said, adding: "These people have no personal responsibility for the aggression against Ukraine." |
| Metsä Group | Forestry, paper, and wood products | Finland | Discontinued its operations in Russia. Wood procurement in Russia for the Svir sawmill and imports to Metsä Group's Finnish and Swedish mills has also been discontinued. | |
| Metso Outotec | Industrial machinery | Finland | Temporarily ceased its deliveries to Russia | |
| Michelin | Tire manufacturer and restaurant guide | France | Restaurant recommendations in Russia. Michelin will transfer its tire manufacturing to a new entity under local management by the end of 2022. | |
| Microsoft | Technology corporation | United States | On 4 March 2022, Microsoft announced that they will suspend all sales and services in Russia Microsoft said they would be actively assisting the government of Ukraine, the EU, the US Federal Government, and NATO. The company will also provide technology and financial support for humanitarian organizations in the region, and is offering support to Ukraine-based Microsoft employees. | |
| Mitsubishi | Corporate group | Japan | May suspend car production, sales in Russia due to sanctions Mitsubishi Electric stops Russian shipments | Mitsubishi Corp. are sticking with the Sakhalin-2 project |
| Mitsui | Corporate group | Japan | | Remains involved in the Sakhalin-2 project. discussing with shareholders course of action |
| Mohawk Industries | Flooring manufacturer | United States | | 4.3% of their sales come from Russia and Ukraine |
| Moncler | | Italy | Suspend operations in Russia | |
| Moody's Investors Service | Investment | United States | Commercial operations in Russia: Moody's Investors Service (MIS), Moody's Analytics (MA) operations | |
| Morrisons | Retail | UK | Remove products from Russia | |
| MSCI | | United States | Curtail Russian access to capital markets | |
| Nasdaq | Financial services | United States | Curtail Russian access to capital markets | |
| Nestlé | Multinational food company | Switzerland | Over 7,000 employees in Russia. Suspends capital investment in Russia Halted operations in Ukraine | Continue to sell "essential" food products in Russia. Nestle's activities in Russia will focus on providing essential food, such as infant food and medical/hospital nutrition. Going forward, Nestlé is suspending brands such as KitKat and Nesquik, among others. Nestlé has already halted non-essential imports and exports into and out of Russia, stopped all advertising, and suspended all capital investment in the country. While Nestlé does not expect to make a profit in the country or pay any related taxes for the foreseeable future in Russia, any profit will be donated to humanitarian relief organizations. |
| NetApp | Technology corporation | United States | Suspend all operations in Russia | |
| Netflix | Streaming service and production | United States | Suspended all services in Russia, as Netflix refused to offer 20 mandatory Russian state TV channels. | |
| Nike | Retail chain | United States | Disabled all online purchases of its products in Russia. On 23 June 2022, Nike announced that it would exit Russia. | |
| Nintendo | Video games | Japan | Halt the sale of games in Russia | |
| Nissan | Automotive | Japan | Halt all shipments to Russia | |
| Nokia | Telecommunications, technology | Finland | Deliveries to Russia | |
| Norsk Hydro | | Norway | Freeze Russian investments | |
| Norwegian Shipowners' Association | | Norway | | Norwegian Shipowners' Association (NSA) continues to operate and rent ships that transport Russian oil. One such example is Viking Shipping AS. Although leaders of the NSA support terminating contracts that are used to transport Russian goods, the chairman of Viking Shipping, Hans Olav Lindal, says this trade is legal. |
| Nvidia | Computer hardware | United States | Product sales | |
| oDesk | Workforce management | United States | | |
| Okta | Software | United States | Stop sales with customers in Russia and Belarus | Support for existing customers "to the extent permitted under existing sanctions and export controls" |
| OneWeb | Communications | UK | Use of Russian rockets | |
| OMV | Energy | Austria | Divest Russian projects | |
| Oracle | Technology | United States | All operations in Russia | |
| Oriflame | Cosmetics | Sweden | | Oriflame refused to leave Russia as their sales in Russia account for 16% of the company's sales. |
| Otis Worldwide | Industrial | United States | Announced that it was scaling back its operations in Russia. it would not take new elevator and escalator orders and not make new investments in the country "for the time being." | Operations in Russia comprised about 2 percent of Otis' 2021 revenues, based mostly on new equipment sales. |
| Panasonic | Multinational conglomerate | Japan | Transactions with Russia | Continues to transact within Russia through official resellers |
| Papa John's | Restaurant chain | United States | March 9, 2022, announcement of suspension of all corporate operations in Russia | All 190 Papa John' s restaurants in Russia are licensed (franchise) and owned by Russian companies and operate normally |
| Paramount Global | Entertainment | United States | Film distribution in Russia | |
| Patreon | Payments | United States | | Patreon "decided to keep operating in Russia, allowing people to make money off the service." In fact, Patreon CEO suggested they may help creators avoid sanctions imposed on Russia. |
| PayPal | Banking | United States | Removed the ability to create any accounts in Russia on 2 March 2022. Three days later on 5 March, PayPal suspended its services in Russia. | |
| Payoneer | Banking | United States | The ability for new customers in Russia to use Payoneer services | |
| Paysera | Communications | Lithuania | Process transactions in Russian roubles | |
| Pegasus Airlines | Airlines | Turkey | Temporarily suspended flights to and from Russia | |
| PepsiCo | Food and beverage | United States | PepsiCo continued operations in Russia amid the invasion of Ukraine March 8, 2022, company announced suspension of the sale of Pepsi-Cola, and our global beverage brands in Russia | "continue to offer our other products in Russia, including daily essentials such as milk and other dairy offerings, baby formula and baby food" Rebranding Pepsi beverages to Evervess and Frustyle with similar flavors. |
| Pfizer | Pharmaceuticals | United States | Maintaining shipments of medicines, but restricting new research and investment | |
| Philip Morris | Tobacco | United States | Philip Morris generates about 8% of its total sales from Russia and Ukraine. On March 9, 2022, company announced it has suspended its planned investments in the Russian Federation, and will scale down manufacturing operations in the country Suspended operations in Ukraine | Scales back manufacturing and continues sales in Russia |
| Pirelli | Tyres | Italy | | Does not plan to close factories as a result of Russia's ongoing invasion |
| Prada | Fashion | Italy | All its retail operations in Russia | |
| PricewaterhouseCoopers | Professional services network | UK | Separating Russia operations | |
| Privatbank | Banking | Ukraine | | |
| Procter & Gamble | Consumer goods | United States | Ending all new capital investments in Russia and "significantly reducing" its portfolio there. | P&G's investments in Russia date back 25 years. 2,500 P&G employees reside in Russia, around 1,000 of which work in offices in Moscow. Around 60 percent of P&G products sold in Russia are produced in Russian factories Company operates at "reduced scale" |
| Puma | Clothing | Germany | Suspended operation of all its stores and online in Russia | |
| PVH | Clothing | United States | Halt product sales across brands Tommy Hilfiger, Calvin Klein, Warner's and all commercial activities in Russia and Belarus | |
| R&A | | | Ban on all Russian competition | |
| Raiffeisen Zentralbank | | Austria | | Raiffeisen is "considering" leaving Russia, despite having "€22.9bn of assets in Russia, with €354mn of exposure to financial institutions that are under sanctions and €119mn to other companies under sanctions." |
| Red Hat | Software | United States | Suspended sales in Russia | |
| Remitly Global | | | Stop accepting new users in Russia | |
| Renault | Automotive | France | Close Russian plants | After initially closing the Russian plants "citing logistical problems after the invasion of Ukraine", Renault has resumed their plants. As of March 21, not all the plants are operational citing lack of parts. |
| Restream | Software | United States | Bans Russian users | |
| Restaurant Brands International | Fast food | Canada | Halts corporate support for its 800-plus franchised Burger King locations in Russia., Company will refuse approvals for any investment or expansion. The suspension also includes pausing operations, marketing and its supply chain. | |
| Richemont | Retail | Switzerland | Suspend all operations in Russia | |
| Rio Tinto | Mining | UK | Is in the process of terminating all commercial relationships it has with any Russian business | did not immediately respond to questions on whether it would continue to buy Russian fuel and other products through non-Russian third parties. |
| Robert Bosch | Industrials | Germany | Bosch closes Ukraine site. Interrupted some of our deliveries to Russia, and are currently not accepting any new orders in our plants there | Bosch turnover in Russia estimates at over €1.4 billion Company did not provide any other updates on its operations in Russia |
| Rockstar Games | Video game | United States | Selling games in Russia | |
| Roku | Streaming platform | United States | Removed RT from its streaming platform in the US and Europe | |
| Rolls-Royce | Aircraft engines | UK | Stopped all business with Russia | |
| S&P | Financial services | United States | Curtail Russian access to capital markets | |
| Sabre Corporation | Software | United States | Distribution service with Russia's Aeroflot, crippling carrier's ability to sell seats | |
| Sainsbury's | Retail | UK | Remove products from Russia | |
| Salesforce | Software | United States | Exiting relationships with resellers and end customers. | |
| Salvatore Ferragamo | Consumer products | Italy | | Salvatore Ferragamo has a very small exposure to Russia, accounting for less than 1% of sales |
| Samsung | Business conglomerate | South Korea | Shipments to Russia | According to the Yonhap news agency, "Samsung enterprises in Russia have not yet reported any production problems [in Russia], though they may appear in case of protracted logistics issues". |
| Sandvik | | Sweden | Halt all operations in Russia | |
| SAP | software | Germany | All new sales in Russia | In a statement made by the Ukrainian Vice Prime Minister SAP is still providing services in Russia due to "humanitarian issues". |
| SAS Institute | Software | United States | All business operations in Russia | |
| Scania AB | Automotive | Sweden | Suspended all business operations with Russia | |
| S-Group | Retail | Finland | All Russian operations | |
| Shell | Oil and gas | UK | Start withdrawal from partnerships with state-controlled Gazprom, including the Sakhalin-II liquefied natural gas facility and its involvement in the Nord Steam 2 pipeline project Shell continues to purchase Russian oil but announced complete withdrawal form all Russian hydrocarbons, incl. oil on March 8, 2022 | |
| Sidley Austin | Law | United States | Suspend services for Russian sanctioned entities | |
| Siemens | Industrial manufacturing | Germany | All new business in and international deliveries to Russia and Belarus are on hold | will continue with local service and maintenance-related activities while "ensuring strict adherence to sanctions." |
| Škoda | Automotive | Czechia | Production of vehicles in Russia | |
| Skrill | Banking | UK | | |
| Société Générale | | France | Curtail Russian access to capital markets | |
| Snapchat | Technology | United States | Banning ad sales in Russia | |
| Solvay | Chemicals | Belgium | Suspended operations or investment in the country. | |
| Sony | Multinational conglomerate | Japan | Film releases in Russia Sales of PlayStation consoles and software in Russia. | |
| SpaceX | Communications | United States | Starlink satellites had become active over Ukraine after a request from the Ukrainian government to replace internet services destroyed by the Russian invasion There were over 10,000 Starlink terminals in Ukraine at the end of April 2022. | |
| SPAR | Retail | Netherlands | | "In Russia, SPAR [...] said they continued to operate business as usual, with the latter paying salaries and suppliers via international banks not affected by sanctions imposed since the invasion of Ukraine." |
| Spotify | Audio streaming and media services | Sweden | Payment for subscription | |
| Stack Overflow | Q&A website for programmers | United States | | Stack Exchange Q&A access will not be restricted in Russia |
| State Street | | United States | Curtail Russian access to capital markets | |
| Starbucks | Coffeehouses and roastery reserves | United States | Suspended all business activity in Russia. Starbucks said that its 130 coffee shops in Russia are owned by a Kuwaiti conglomerate and said its licensee will temporarily shutter locations | Selling a business to a local owner. Rebranding to Stars Coffee. |
| Subaru | Automobile | Japan | Halt all shipments to Russia | |
| SUSE | Software | Germany | Suspended sales in Russia | |
| Svetofor | Retailer | Russia | The chain which trades as MERE has suspended its British operations and shut its four stores. | |
| Swarovski | Glass | Austria | Sales in Russia | |
| Swatch | Watches | Switzerland | Suspend direct operations in Russia | |
| SWIFT | Financial telecommunication | Belgium | Bars 7 Russian banks from SWIFT | |
| Swinkels Family Brewers | Brewery | Netherlands | | Royal Swinkels Family Brewers (formerly Bavaria Brewery) CEO stated he "sees no legal grounds for departure". |
| Sylvamo | Paper products | United States | Suspend operations in Russia | |
| Tesco | Retail | UK | Removed Russian Products from sale in its stores | |
| Tesla | Automotive and solar | United States | Tesla, Inc. announced that select Tesla Supercharger stations near Ukraine for its electric vehicles would be free of charge to use. | |
| TikTok | Networking service | China | Service in Russia | |
| Titan Tire Corporation | Networking service | United States | | According to a list maintained by the Yale School of Management, as of March 2022, the company continues to do business in Russia despite a widespread boycott. |
| TJ Maxx | Retailer | United States | Divest Familia subsidiary | |
| TotalEnergies | Energy | France | Halts new investment in Russia | TotalEnergies stays put in Russia. Did not sell its 19.4% stake in Gazprom |
| T-Mobile US | Telecommunications | United States | Announced calls between Ukraine and anywhere else in the world would be free of charge | |
| Toyota | Automotive | Japan | Stop production at its St-Petersburg plant and imports of vehicles, until further notice, due to supply chain disruptions | |
| Trafigura | Trading | Singapore | Freezes investments in Russia | |
| Tripadvisor | Travel | United States | Remove Kremlin-linked propaganda and ads | |
| TSMC | Technology | Taiwan | Chip sales to Russia | |
| Twitch | Live streaming service | United States | Banned Russian state media | |
| Twitter | Microblogging and social networking | United States | Demotes Russian State media content Paused all ads on Ukraine and Russia to ensure "critical public safety information is elevated and ads don't detract from it" | |
| ThyssenKrupp | Industrials | Germany | | thyssenkrupp Industrial Solutions (RUS) LLC had 60 years of successful activity in Russia and the Soviet Union and currently has workforce of more than 400 employees in Russia |
| Uber | Technologies | United States | Cut ties with Russian companies | |
| Unicredit | Financial services | Italy | | "UniCredit SpA is considering selling its Russian unit through a structure that would allow the bank to repurchase the subsidiary if the geopolitical situation stabilizes" |
| Unilever | Packaged goods | UK | On March 5, 2022, company issued a statement "We are deeply shocked by the senseless acts of violence being perpetrated against the innocent people of Ukraine and we condemn the Russian state's invasion", but did not provide any additional information about its operations in Russian Federation. On March 8, 2022 "Unilever has suspended all imports and exports of its products to Russia is stopping all investment in the country." Unilever's business operations in Ukraine have stopped | |
| Union Pay | Payments | China | | Union Pay has continued their business operations and have even stepped up efforts to fill the void left by Western companies leaving, like Visa and Mastercard. |
| Under Armour | Apparel | United States | Halt all shipments to Russia | |
| United Airlines | Airline | United States | No flying over Russian airspace | |
| UPS | Logistics | United States | Halted all shipments to both Ukraine and Russia upon the invasion | |
| Universal Pictures | Film production and distribution | United States | Pauses theatrical releases in Russia | |
| Valero Energy | Oil | United States | Suspended all purchases of Russian crude oil | |
| Valve | Software | United States | | Valve has not taken any action to change its business operations in Russia or made a public declaration condemning the war. In fact, in the statement made to Polygon on March 30, Valve has suggested it is working on measures aimed at bypassing sanctions "by April" |
| Verizon Communications | Telecommunications | United States | Announced calls between Ukraine and anywhere else in the world would be free of charge | |
| Visa | Banking | United States | Suspended all Russia operations Pledged $2 million toward humanitarian relief funds for Ukraine. | Cards issued in Russia work only domestically. |
| Vodafone Ukraine | Communications | Ukraine | | |
| Volkswagen | Motor vehicles | Germany | Volkswagen Group (VW, Skoda, Audi, Porsche and Bentley brands) suspends car production in Russia, stops Exports | |
| Volvo Cars | Luxury vehicles | Sweden | Suspends sales and shipments to Russia | |
| VR Group | Railway | Finland | | After initially announcing that VR will suspend traffic, VR has decided to resume operations on 30 March. |
| Waitrose | Supermarket | UK | Remove products from Russia | |
| Warner Bros | Mass media | United States | Film releases in Russia | |
| Western Union | Financial services | United States | Suspended money transfers to Russia | |
| White & Case | | United States | Suspended services for all Kremlin entities | |
| Wintershall | Oil and natural gas producer | Germany | Stops payments to Russia, writes off $1.1 bln Nord Stream 2 loan | |
| Wipro | IT consultancy | India | | According to The Register, Wipro, which earned over $1bn from Russia in 2021, has been silent on its Russian operations despite several attempts to reach them. |
| Wise | | | Suspend Russian partnerships | |
| World Federation of Exchanges | | | Suspend all Russian members and affiliates | |
| WPP | | UK | Suspend all operations in Russia | |
| YIT | Construction | Finland | Finland's biggest construction company YIT discontinued construction material purchases from Russia and has halted investments in plots or start up new apartments in Russia. | |
| YOOX | Fashion retail | Italy | Have stopped shipping orders to Russia to due logistical issues | |
| YouTube | Social media | United States | Bans Russian state media channels Stops monetization for creators in Russia | Fully available in Russia without advertising. |
| Yum! Brands | Fast food | United States | KFC, Pizza Hut, Taco Bell, The Habit Burger Grill brands worldwide. Company is suspending operations of company-owned restaurants in Russia KFC offered food assistance to Ukrainians | A rebranding to Rostik's is being prepared. The name was used before the KFC brand appeared in Russia. |
| Zaha Hadid Architects | Architecture | UK | Stops working on their projects in Russia | |
| ZF Group | Car parts manufacturer | Germany | Exports to Russia and production in Russia | |
| Zoom | Communications | United States | Restricted use of its software for Russian companies with state assets | |

== Companies providing donations and match funding to Ukraine ==
| Company | Industry | Country | Donation amount | Match funding | Total donations | Grant description |
|---|---|---|---|---|---|---|
| 3M | Conglomerate | United States | $2,376,000 | | $2,376,000 | Over 2,508 3Mers have donated more than the US$376,000 through GlobalGiving's Ukraine Crisis Relief Fund Microsite. With the 3M Foundation dollar-for-dollar match, more than the US$752,000 will be put toward basic needs for those affected by the invasion of the country – food, shelter, and clean water, as well as access to education and mental health resources. The employee contributions are on top of 3Mgives' commitment of at least $2 million to directly support relief efforts, as well as the heartfelt direct donations of housing, money, and personal goods 3Mers have sent to colleagues in Ukraine. |
| 11 Bit Studios | Video games | Poland | $690,000 | | $690,000 | 11 Bit Studios, the Poland-based developer behind This War of Mine and Frostpunk, has revealed that it has donated 3m PLN (roughly $695,000) to Ukrainian aid efforts amidst Russia's ongoing invasion of the country. |
| Adidas | Clothing | Germany | $1,090,000 | | $1,090,000 | Adidas announced a donation of €1 million to refugee and children's charities including Save the Children, SOS Children's Villages, Terre des Hommes, and UNO-Flüchtlingshilfe to provide basic goods and support to evacuated families. |
| Airbnb | Online marketplace | United States | | $10,000,000 | $10,000,000 | Airbnb's co-founders - Brian Chesky, Joe Gebbia, Nathan Blecharczyk, and his wife Elizabeth committed to match up to $10 million in donations to Airbnb.org in March 2022, in support of the effort to offer housing to refugees fleeing Ukraine. |
| Allianz | Financial services | Germany | $10.900,000 | $2,725,000 | $13,625,000 | At Allianz, we are making €10 million available to support humanitarian efforts for Ukraine, along with €2.5 million to match employee donations. The first €1 million will go to the German Red Cross who can immediately assist displaced people and those in need. |
| AbbVie | Biopharmaceutical | United States | $1,000,000 | | $1,000,000 | AbbVie is donating a total of $1 million to International Medical Corps and Project Hope for medical care and supplies for Ukraine and Ukrainian refugees. It is also donating essential medicines to the Ukrainian government and disaster relief partners. |
| ABP Food Group | Foodservice | Ireland | | $2,180,000 | $2,180,000 | ABP Food Group announced that it has issued an appeal to farmers asking for funding to help support the work of a number of charities in Ukraine. The company said it will match all donations, up to €2 million. |
| Accenture | Professional services Information technology Consulting | United States | $5,000,000 | | $5,000,000 | Accenture announced it will donate $5 million to nonprofit relief organizations working to help people in Ukraine and those who are being displaced into Poland, Romania, Slovakia, Hungary, and the Czech Republic. The company will also match 100% of the donations from its employees. |
| Acne Studios | Fashion | Sweden | $109,000 | | $109,000 | In response to the Russian invasion of Ukraine, Acne Studios donated €100,000 to UNICEF and to the U.N. High Commissioner for Refugees, or UNHCR. |
| Air Canada | Airline | Canada | | $197,500 | $197,500 | Air Canada said it will be donating $10 for every booking made on aircanada.com to support Ukraine relief aid, with a total donation of up to $250,000. |
| Aldi | Retail | Germany | $5,450,000 | | $5,450,000 | Aldi group have committed to a further €5 million for established aid organization ensuring help reaches those that need it most from the war in Ukraine. |
| Aldwin Callen | Wealth Management Company | Taiwan | $2,500,000 | | $2,500,000 | Throughout the rest of the year, Aldwin Callen plans to deploy 250 Humanitarian Medical Kits (equivalent to 250,000 treatments valued at $2.5 million) to Ukraine and neighboring refugee communities. |
| Algorand Foundation | Software | Singapore | | $730,000 | $730,000 | Algorand Foundation is today committing to match all Algo donations to Ukraine Humanitarian relief, up to 1 million Algo. |
| allbranded | Progressive company | United States | $6,000 | | $6,000 | allbranded donated $6,000 to support refugees in Ukraine, but also in Germany, in order to help refugees with immigration. The donations were made to the initiative of the Ukrainischen Hilfsstabs (the North Germany-Ukrainian auxiliary staff), as well as the Feine Ukraine (an association of German-Ukrainian cooperation). |
| Alliant Insurance | Insurance | United States | | $100,000 | $100,000 | In response to the ongoing situation in Ukraine, Alliant partnered with the American Red Cross and UNICEF to solicit donations. Employees responded, raising more than $110,000 with Alliant providing a $100,000 match. The match program also covered additional organizations providing humanitarian support and vital resources to Ukraine. |
| Allstate | Insurance | United States | $1,000,000 | | $1,000,000 | In support for victims of the war in Ukraine, Allstate has set up a $1 million Ukrainian Relief fund and is matching employee donations. |
| Alpha | Pharmacy Group | Canada | $3,950 | | $3,950 | The Alpha Group of Pharmacies has donated $5,000 to support immediate humanitarian efforts in the war-torn country. The money was donated to the Canadian Red Cross's Ukraine Humanitarian Crisis Appeal. |
| Amazon.com, Inc. | E-commerce; Cloud Computing; Artificial intelligence Consumer electronics Entertainment; Digital distribution Self-driving cars Supermarket | United States | $5,000,000 | $5,000,000 | $10,000,000 | Amazon announced it is donating $5 million to aid organizations on the ground (UNICEF, UNHCR, World Food Program, Red Cross, Polska Akcja Humanitarna, and Save the Children) for Ukrainian humanitarian relief. The company will also match up to $5 million in additional employee donations to the same relief orgs. |
| AMD Medicom Inc. | Insurance | Canada | $197,500 | | $197,500 | In order to support the humanitarian efforts underway in Ukraine, Medicom will be sending over $250,000 CAD worth of medical products from North America and Europe. In addition, the company is launching a fundraiser among its nearly 2,000 employees and will match every dollar donated. The funds raised will be donated to Doctors Without Borders and used primarily to improve access to health care and medication. |
| American Express | Banking Financial services | United States | $1,000,000 | | $1,000,000 | $250,000 to our long-standing partners at the International Rescue Committee (IRC) to provide necessary resources where they are needed most, including to those who have fled their homes. $250,000 to the International Medical Corps (IMC), which has deployed mobile medical teams to provide essential emergency and primary health services; mental health and psychosocial support services; and COVID-19 awareness and prevention services to help keep affected populations safe from the pandemic. $250,000 will help our long-time crisis-response partners at the American Red Cross to support coordinated relief efforts by the International Federation of Red Cross and Red Crescent Societies (IFRC)and other Red Cross partners who are responding to urgent needs and providing technical assistance on the ground. $250,000 toward UNICEF's emergency appeal, launched last week, to support children and families as the crisis escalates, with life-saving programs, safe water, emergency health, hygiene, and education aid and other immediate help for those in need of support. |
| Archer Hotels | Hotels | Poland | $1,000,000 | | $1,000,000 | Arche Hotels, a Polish hotel chain, has pledged more than $1 million to provide free temporary housing for Ukrainian refugees across its 16 locations in Poland. |
| Ares Management | Asset management | United States | $300,000 | | $300,000 | A$100,000 in corporate contributions to CARE International to provide water and hygiene kits for Ukraine. $100,000 in corporate contributions to Voices of Children Foundation to offer psychological and evacuation support for children of Ukraine. $100,000 to World Central Kitchen to ensure meals for both those who emigrate to neighboring countries and those who remain in Ukraine. |
| Arla Foods | Dairy | Denmark | $1,090,000 | | $1,090,000 | Arla Foods is donating €1 million to the Red Cross and working to provide food to Ukrainian refugees. |
| Armani | Fashion leisure | Italy | $545,000 | | $545,000 | The Armani Group announced a donation of €500,000 to UNHCR for the assistance and protection of those who have been forced to flee the war in Ukraine. |
| Asda | Retail | UK | $1,188,000 | | $1,188,000 | Asda Stores Ltd. and the Asda Foundation are donating a £1 million package to support those affected by the invasion of Ukraine and removing Russian products from stores and Asda.com. The measures will include a donation of £100k from the Asda Foundation for national UK-based refugee support groups, with grants of up to £580k available to support local and grass-roots refugee groups within the communities we serve across the UK. Asda will be making a £250k donation to UNICEF to support the setup of a Blue Dot centre, which will provide a safe space for up to 5,000 children and families and give them access to things like emergency water and hygiene kits on the ground. |
| Astellas Pharma | Pharmaceutical | Japan | $81,000 | | $81,000 | Astellas is donating 10 million yen to UNICEF to support their humanitarian effort in response to the crisis in Ukraine. |
| AstraZeneca | Pharmaceutical Biotechnology | United States | $5,000,000 | $500,000 | $2,500,000 | AstraZeneca has donated $2 million to support relief agencies working in Ukraine, Poland and surrounding areas with a focus on providing healthcare and humanitarian assistance to those affected by the conflict. Funding is being provided to Project HOPE, working with and through the World Health Organization, and International Medical Corps. AstraZeneca donated twenty-four pallets of medicines, worth $3 million, from its warehouse in Ukraine to its humanitarian relief partner Direct Relief which is working directly with the Ukrainian Ministry of Health. AstraZeneca team members around the world have donated over $500,000 to appeals being run by UNICEF and The Red Cross, which AstraZeneca is matching for a total of $500,000. |
| Atlas Copco | Industrial equipment | Sweden | $110,000 | | $110,000 | The Atlas Copco Group has made a donation of 1m SEK to UNHCR, the UN Refugee Agency. |
| ATN Corporation | optics | United States | $300,000 | | $300,000 | ATN Corp. has donated $300,000 to The Gorta Group, an NGO established in 1965 to serve people and communities in war zones and conflicts, to provide humanitarian and medical relief to Ukraine. |
| Aurora World, Inc. | Manufacturing | South Korea | $250,000 | | $250,000 | Through the Toy Foundation, Aurora World has donated $250,000 of plush products to provide aid to the children and families in Ukraine. |
| Auto Wash Car Wash | Car wash | United States | | $2,500 | $2,500 | Auto Wash Car Wash, with a location on West Main Street in Batavia, is matching dollar for dollar all donations made to a Ukraine relief fund when a wash is purchased until it reaches its goal of raising $5,000. All money raised will go to the International Committee of the Red Cross, who provides humanitarian aid and supplies to families and those on the frontline in Ukraine. |
| Backcountry.com | Ecommerce Outdoor Industry | United States | $10,000 | | $10,000 | Backcountry donated $10,000 to CARE, which is helping refugees with emergency assistance.o help with refugee assistance. |
| Bain & Company | Management consulting | United States | $16,000,000 | | $16,000,000 | Bain & Company has announced a $1M cash contribution to United Nations High Commissioner for Refugees and will commit an additional $15M of pro bono support toward refugee work. |
| Baker Creek Heirloom Seed Company | Seed company | United States | $1,600,000 | | $1,600,000 | Baker Creek Heirloom Seed Company has raised $1.6 million in aid for Ukraine thorough its seed sales from February 25 through 27. All donations will go to World Help to provide humanitarian aid. |
| Banco Santander | Financial services | Spain | $1,090,000 | | $1,090,000 | Santander said it is making an initial donation of 1 million euros ($1 million) to the Red Cross and the United Nations High Commissioner for Refugees, a nonprofit founded to aid and protect refugees, forcibly displaced communities and stateless people, and to assist in their voluntary repatriation, local integration, or resettlement to another country. |
| Bandai Namco Entertainment | Video games | Japan | $854,000 | | $854,000 | Bandai Namco announced that it will donate 100 million yen (around $854,000) to the charity Save the Children in support of Ukraine. |
| Bank of America | Financial services | United States | $1,000,000 | | $1,000,000 | Bank of America pledged to donate $1 million to the American Red Cross and other non-profit groups that are helping Ukraine and refugees fleeing invasion by Russia. Bank of America is spreading its donation across five groups - the Red Cross and Red Crescent network in Ukraine and the region, World Central Kitchen, Cooperative for Assistance and Relief Everywhere, International Medical Corps and Project Hope. |
| BASF | Chemicals | Germany | $3,390,070 | | $3,390,070 | BASF employees donated €2,110,156 to the BASF Stiftung (BASF Foundation) as part of the company-wide initiative #ColleaguesForUkraine. The company will match the amount. The amount donated by employees will go 100% to BASF colleagues from Ukraine. The second half of the total amount – the sum added by BASF – will benefit the Ukrainian refugees as a whole through UNO-Flüchtlingshilfe ("UNO Refugee Aid"), the national Partner of the UN Refugee Agency UNHCR in Germany. To help people in Ukraine, BASF provided €1 million in emergency aid to the German Red Cross. |
| Bayer | Life sciences Pharmaceuticals Chemicals | Germany | $3,924,000 | $1,090,000 | $5,014,000 | Bayer announced a 3 million Euro disaster relief fund to strengthen emergency measures in response to the invasion of Ukraine. The support fund will benefit international and local humanitarian aid organizations engaging in Ukraine and Eastern European neighboring states. The fund also includes the company's initial humanitarian response released only one day after the first attacks, making 300,000 Euros available for immediate aid by the German Red Cross and local organizations. Immediately after Russia's invasion of Ukraine, Bayer released €300,000 for immediate aid by the German Red Cross and local organizations. Bayer employees have donated more than €1,000,000 in additional funding for Ukraine. The company has vowed to match employees' donations. Bayer made 300,000 Euros available to the German Red Cross and local organizations for immediate aid to those affected by the war in Ukraine and Eastern European neighboring states. The grant is part of a 3 million Euro disaster relief fund announced by Bayer to strengthen emergency measures in response to the invasion of Ukraine. |
| BBVA | Financial services | Spain | $545,000 | | $545,000 | BBVA will donate €500,000 to UNHCR to respond to the humanitarian emergency in Ukraine. |
| Beiersdorf | Consumer goods | Germany | $2,180,000 | | $2,180,000 | BIn response to the crisis in Ukraine, Beiersdorf initiated an immediate donation of €2 million to the German Red Cross and CARE Deutschland. It also donated more than 300,000 various products across Europe. |
| Benevity | Computer software Cloud software Software as a service | Canada | | $79,000 | $79,000 | Benevity is providing a 2:1 match, up to $100,000 CDN in support of the humanitarian crisis in Ukraine. For every dollar donated through its Community Impact Portal, Benevity will donate two. |
| BentallGreenOak | Property management company | Canada | $39,500 | | $39,500 | BentallGreenOak has donated $50,000 to UNICEF to support children and families in Ukraine. |
| Blexr | marketing company | Malta | $10,900 | | $10,900 | Blexr, which works in lead generation for the iGaming industry, gave €10,000 to the Red Cross's Ukraine appeal. |
| Blue Bottle Coffee | Coffee industry | United States | $500,000 | | $500,000 | BLUE BOTTLE COFFEE has made a US$50,000 donation to the International Rescue Committee's humanitarian relief efforts and to the GlobalGiving Ukraine Crisis Relief Fund. |
| Boehringer Ingelheim | Pharmaceuticals | Germany | $2725000 | | $2725000 | Boehringer Ingelheim made a donation of EUR 2.5 million to charitable organizations providing humanitarian support to Ukraine and its citizens. The donation will be distributed to the following charitable organizations: German Red Cross (EUR 750k); Aktionsbündnis Katastrophenhilfe (EUR 750k); Aktion Deutschland Hilft (EUR 500k); and UNO-Flüchtlingshilfe (EUR 500k). |
| Bolt | Transportation network company | Estonia | $5,722,500 | | $5,722,500 | Estonian Transport startup Bolt will donate €5 million to charities supporting Ukraine and will shut operations in Belarus and remove Russian products from its grocery delivery service. Bolt pledged €250,000 in donations for Ukraine relief. |
| Booz Allen Hamilton | Management consulting Information technology consulting | United States | | $100,000 | $100,000 | Booz Allen Hamilton is matching up to $100k in employee donations for CARE's Ukraine Crisis Fund. |
| Booking Holdings | Travel Technology | United States | $1,000,000 | | $1,000,000 | Booking Holdings recently donated $1 million to the International Committee of the Red Cross to assist with their aid efforts related to the conflict in Ukraine. |
| BP | Oil and gas | United Kingdom | $20,000,000 | | $20,000,000 | BP plc donated $5 million to the International Red Cross for Ukraine humnaitarian relief. BP plc donated $5 million to UNICEF to support children and families in Ukraine. BP plc donated $5 million in food and fuel cards to be distributed at the Polish border with Ukrainer by BP retail teams – working with its NGO partners. BP provided $5 million of support across Poland, Hungary and Romania – working with local aid organizations to help keep people safe. |
| Canada Goose | Retail | Canada | $79,000 | | $79,000 | Through the Canada Goose Response Program, the company are donating $100,000 CAD to the United Nations High Commissioner for Refugees (UNHCR) who are leading global humanitarian efforts in Ukraine and the region. |
| Canadian Imperial Bank of Commerce | Financial services Banking | Canada | $479,000 | | $479,000 | $100,000 to the UNICEF Canada Ukraine Appeal, which is focused on providing humanitarian aid to children and families and protecting children's rights, while responding to the vulnerabilities caused by the dual crises of conflict and COVID-19. $50,000 to Canadian Red Cross Ukraine Humanitarian Crisis Appeal, which will enable the Red Cross and Red Crescent Movement to respond to humanitarian needs generated by the recent crisis in Ukraine. This includes supporting preparedness, immediate and ongoing relief efforts, long-term recovery, resiliency, and other critical humanitarian activities as needs arise. $50,000 to United Nations Refugee Agency Canada (UNHCR), which will help ensure that Ukrainians forced to flee their homes are sheltered and safe. $300,000 contribution to organizations assisting with resettlement efforts in Canada and for humanitarian relief efforts in Ukraine. These organizations include the Canadian Ukrainian Immigrant Aid Society (CUIAS), Canada-Ukraine Foundation, and Talent Beyond Boundaries. |
| Canadian National Railway | Transport | Canada | $869,000 | | $869,000 | Canadian National will make donations totaling $C1.1 million to two organizations — the Canada-Ukraine Foundation, and U.S. non-profit Razom — to support Ukrainians displaced by the war in Ukraine. |
| Canadian Pacific Railway | Rail transport | Canada | $395,000 | | $395,000 | Canadian Pacific pledged CA$500,000 to the Canadian Red Cross and that it would match employee donations to the Canadian Red Cross and American Red Cross over the next 30 days. CP will also match donations to other aid agencies supporting Ukraine relief efforts via CP's employee charitable giving program. |
| Canon Inc. | Electronics | Japan | $1,090,000 | | $1,090,000 | The Canon Group is making a donation of approximately one million euros (approximately JPY 130 million / USD $1.1 million) to the UNHCR refugee agency and other international humanitarian organizations. These funds will be used to provide support to the Ukrainian people whose lives have been so deeply affected. |
| Capri Holdings | Fashion | United Kingdom | $1,090,000 | | $1,090,000 | Capri Holdings Ltd., parent of Michael Kors, Jimmy Choo and Versace, said it will be donating over 1 million euros in essential clothing such as coats, sweaters and shoes from its brands through the company's distribution center in Venlo, the Netherlands, to aid those displaced by the ongoing war in Ukraine. Donated products will be distributed within Poland and Ukraine border through a Shop Without Cash Registers, an organization based in Brwinow, Poland. The organization has set up a location in donated space at the Galeria Brwinow Shopping Center, where the products and clothing are displayed on hangers in a store-like environment, making it more convenient for refugees to find the items they need. |
| Cargill | Conglomerate | United States | $1,200,000 | | $1,200,000 | Cargill is contributing an initial $1.2 million to support partners in Ukraine relief efforts, including the International Red Cross, World Food Programme, Save the Children, World Central Kitchen and the European Food Banks Federation. Cargill is also matching employee donations and supporting impacted employees through its Employee Disaster Relief Fund. |
| Cargolux | Airline | Luxembourg | $3,815,000 | | $3,815,000 | Cargolux will contribute one million euros to UNICEF and one million euros to the UNHCR, the UN Refugee Agency, as well as one million euros to Médecins Sans Frontières (MSF). A further €1 million will be allocated to initiatives led by local groups and communes at Cargolux's headquarters in Luxembourg. |
| Carlsberg Group | Beverages | Denmark | $3,750,000 | | $3,750,000 | The Carlsberg Foundation and the Tuborg Foundation will donate DKK 75 million (EUR 10 million) to the relief efforts in Ukraine. Funds will be donated, amongst others, through the Danish branches of recognised international aid organisations with the purpose to support the massive relief efforts currently underway. The funds will be used for general humanitarian relief efforts and by partnering with local organisations to support all Ukrainian people in need. |
| Carnegie Corporation of New York | Nonprofit organization | United States | $1,000,000 | | $1,000,000 | Carnegie Corporation of New York announced a donation of $1 million to the International Rescue Committee (IRC), a global humanitarian relief organization, to assist those being forced to flee their homes in Ukraine. The support will help fund an emergency appeal made by IRC as it works to provide critical aid to displaced people in Ukraine and to refugees pouring into neighboring countries. |
| Carnival Corporation & plc | Hospitality Tourism | United States | $50,000 | | $50,000 | Carnival Corporation's namesake brand, Carnival Cruise Line, made a $50,000 donation to World Central Kitchen, honoring its employees and crew members from Ukraine. |
| Cawley studio | womenswear brand | England | $5,940 | | $5,940 | Cawley Studio raffled its Ella vest to raise money for Ukraine, with the UK-based brand raising more than £4,500 for British Red Cross. |
| CD Projekt | Video games | Poland | $230,000 | | $230,000 | The CD Projekt Group has decided to support humanitarian aid efforts in and around Ukraine by donating 1 million PLN to the Polska Akcja Humanitarna. |
| CD Projekt Red | Video games | Poland | $230,000 | | $230,000 | CD Projekt Red donated 1 million PLN to Polish Humanitarian Action, which is working directly with Ukrainian citizens affected and displaced by Russia's attack on Ukraine. |
| Cedar's Foods | Mediterranean foods | United States | $100,000 | | $100,000 | Cedar's Foods, a Haverhill, Massachusetts-based company, has donated $100,000 to World Central Kitchen (WCK) to help feed Ukrainian refugees. |
| Celiac Disease Foundation | Diagnosis Treatments | United States | | $25,000 | $25,000 | countries welcoming them; and provide Ukrainian refugees with counseling to help with their trauma recovery and social integration in the hosting countries. |
| Ceramic Tile Distributor Association | Manufacturers Distributors | United States | $10,000 | | $10,000 | The Ceramic Tile Distributors Association contributed $10,000 to Save the Children for relief efforts in Ukraine through the TILE$4UkrainianChildren fund. |
| Chesapeake Energy | Petroleum industry | United States | $5,000,000 | | $5,000,000 | For humanitarian needs of the people of Ukraine. |
| Chiesi Farmaceutici | Pharmaceuticals | Italy | $1,090,000 | | $1,090,000 | Chiesi announced an initial donation of one million-euro, part of which has already been committed to support humanitarian NGOs such as the Croce Rossa Italiana and UNHCR Italia, Agenzia ONU per i Rifugiati, operating in Ukraine and a fund for the reception of refugees on the Italian territory. |
| Choice Hotels | Hospitality Franchising | United States | | $50,000 | $50,000 | Choice Hotels will match customer donations of rewards points to the American Red Cross to help provide humanitarian relief in response to the Ukraine crisis, up to a total of $50,000. |
| Chubb Limited | Insurance Reinsurance | Switzerland | $1,000,000 | | $1,000,000 | Chubb announced a $1 million grant and employee matching gift campaign supporting Project Hope, which is providing humanitarian relief to the people of Ukraine. |
| Cisco | Networking hardware Networking software | United States | $4,000,000 | | $4,000,000 | CISCO has made a contribution of $3 million in in-kind support to various local organizations operating in Ukraine and surrounding countries. Cisco has donated $1M to the UNHCR to support their relief activities and support services for Ukrainians fleeing the country. |
| Citizen Brick | Manufacturing | United States | $161,540 | | $161,540 | Citizen Brick, a custom Lego design studio in Chicago, created figures of Ukrainian president Volodymyr Zelensky. The figures of the Ukrainian president sold out in less than 24 hours, raising more than $145,000 for Direct Relief. Through the sale of the President Zelenskyy LEGO minifigs and Molotov cocktails, Citizen Bricks was able to raise $16,540 for Direct Relief to assist their efforts to bring medical supplies to those in need. |
| Civitas Resources | Natural gas liquids company | United States | $10,000,000 | | $10,000,000 | Civitas Resources, Inc. announced a pledge of $10 million in humanitarian aid to Ukrainians and refugees impacted by the Russian invasion of Ukraine. Funding will be distributed to numerous charitable organizations associated with immediate refugee assistance for displaced Ukrainians as well as other peaceful humanitarian efforts. |
| Clorox | Consumer household goods food pet care commercial cleaning | United States | $100,000 | | $100,000 | The Clorox Company is supporting Ukraine relief through Workplace giving (matching employee donations dollar for dollar) - $100K cash donation to its major disaster partner, Red Cross. |
| The Coca-Cola Company | Beverage | United States | $9,000,000 | | $9,000,000 | $9 million in humanitarian relief was committed by the COCA-COLA COMPANY as part of Global Citizen's Stand Up For Ukraine rally on April 8. This contribution will go toward increasing food and water supply in Ukraine, providing immediate relief for internally displaced people in Ukraine and supporting refugees in surrounding countries. |
| Colgate-Palmolive | Consumer goods | United States | $1,000,000 | | $1,000,000 | $1 million in hygiene and pet nutrition products as well as financial contributions to the Red Cross and other humanitarian relief and animal welfare organizations. Colgate-Palmolive has also launched an employee match program to support relief efforts to community based organizations. |
| Columbia Memorial Health | Healthcare | United States | $33,000 | | $33,000 | Columbia Memorial Health donated $33,000 in medical supplies to Ukraine. |
| ConocoPhillips | Petroleum industry | United States | $2,000,000 | | $2,000,000 | ConocoPhillips is donating $2 million to provide humanitarian assistance to those directly impacted by the war in Ukraine. Donations will be distributed between the United States Fund for UNICEF and other charities providing direct relief in this area. |
| Continental Development Corporation | Development corporation | United States | $10,000 | | $10,000 | CONTINENTAL DEVELOPMENT CORPORATION has made a donation of US$10,000 through the GlobalGiving Ukraine Crisis Relief fund. |
| Cooper University Hospital | Health services | United States | $50,000 | | $50,000 | Cooper University Health Care is donating more than $50,000 in medical supplies to help the citizens of Ukraine. The contributions collected from area hospitals will be transported to Poland and then will be distributed to drop-off points across Ukraine. |
| Crush Management | Music company | United States | $25,000 | | $25,000 | CRUSH MUSIC has made a US$25,000 donation to humanitarian relief efforts in Ukraine through the GlobalGiving Ukraine Crisis Relief Fund. |
| CSL Behring | Biopharmaceuticals health care | United States | $1,744,000 | | $1,744,000 | CSL Behring donated €1,600,000 to humanitarian relief efforts in Ukraine. |
| Daiichi Sankyo | Pharmaceutical | Japan | $1,000,000 | | $1,000,000 | To support humanitarian aid for those impacted by the conflict in Ukraine, Daiichi Sankyo Company, Limited will donate US$1 million to the United Nations Children's Fund (UNICEF). |
| Danaher Corporation | Conglomerate | United States | $1,000,000 | | $1,000,000 | In response to the humanitarian crisis in Ukraine Danaher Corporation has committed $1 million to NGOs in the region. |
| Danone | Food processing | France | $545,000 | | $545,000 | Danone donated 500,000 euros to the Red Cross to support humanitarian aid efforts. Funding will be used to supply water, food and medicine. In addition, Danone will match fund every euro donated by employees for humanitarian efforts and is working with the Red Cross to determine how it can bring a variety of basic necessities to Ukraine. Danone's team in neighboring countries are actively involved in collecting and distributing goods to refugees. |
| Delta Air Lines | Airline | United States | $1,100,000 | | $1,100,000 | $100,000 to the United Nations High Commissioner for Refugees to assist in providing humanitarian aid to people affected by the crisis in Ukraine. $1 million to the American Red Cross and Global Red Cross Movement in support of humanitarian relief efforts in Ukraine, which are delivering needed supplies, first aid training, evacuation assistance and more. |
| Devon Energy | Petroleum industry | United States | $20,000,000 | | $20,000,000 | For humanitarian needs of the people of Ukraine. |
| Diamondback Energy | Petroleum industry | United States | $10,000,000 | | $10,000,000 | Diamondback Energy, Inc. announced that it will commit $10 million to support various non-profit entities that have risen to meet the humanitarian needs of the people of Ukraine displaced by the Russian invasion of their country. |
| Docking drawer | Drawer hardware company | United States | $10,000 | | $10,000 | Docking Drawer has donated $10,000, split equally between several apolitical charities (listed below), all of which directly help the citizens of Ukraine. |
| DocuSign | Software | United States | $40,000 | | $40,000 | DOCUSIGN has made a US$40,000 donation to UN agency humanitarian relief efforts and to the GlobalGiving Ukraine Crisis Relief Fund. |
| Dontnod Entertainment | Video games | France | $32,700 | | $32,700 | DONTNOD has pledged €30,000 to the Red Cross in Ukraine. |
| Door County Candle Company Inc. | Handcrafted candles | United States | $100,000 | | $100,000 | Door County Candle Company debuted a Ukraine-themed candle for their customers, with all the money made from the candle going to Razom For Ukraine. The first week's donation was over $100,000. |
| Dow Chemical Company | Chemicals | United States | $275,000 | | $275,000 | Dow is contributing $275,000 to help meet humanitarian needs for the people of Ukraine. This funding will support the International Red Cross Movement through CAF America. |
| Dr. Konstantin Frank Winery | Grape growing Winemaking | United States | $42,000 | | $42,000 | Dr. Konstantin Frank Winery donated half of all sales over the March 4–6 weekend to World Central Kitchen, which has set up on the ground at the Ukraine-Poland border providing warm meals for the hungry. The winery's efforts has raised nearly $42,000. |
| Drax Group | Electrical power generation | United Kingdom | $370,000 | | $370,000 | Renewable energy company Drax Group is donating $370,000 to the Disasters Emergency Committee Ukraine Humanitarian Appeal to support relief efforts for the Ukrainian people following Russia's invasion. The DEC Ukraine Humanitarian Appeal aims to provide food, water, shelter, healthcare, and protection to families fleeing the conflict who have left their homes. |
| DST Global | Venture capital Private equity | China | $3,500,000 | | $3,500,000 | DST Global has donated $3.5 million to Stand With Ukraine, the GoFundMe initiative launched by Mila Kunis and Ashton Kutcher to help the refugee and humanitarian relief efforts. The fund will benefit Flexport.org and Airbnb.org, two organizations who are actively on the ground providing immediate help to those who need it most. Flexport.org is organizing shipments of relief supplies to refugee sites in Poland, Romania, Hungary, Slovakia and Moldova. Airbnb.org is providing free, short-term housing to refugees fleeing Ukraine. |
| DuPont | Chemicals company | United States | $200,000 | | $200,000 | DuPont has pledged $200,000 along with matched employee donations to the International Red Cross to address humanitarian relief and refugee support for Ukraine. |
| E Ink | Electronic paper | Taiwan | $150,000 | | $150,000 | E Ink nnounced that they have donated US$150,000 to UNICEF for the support of children and families in Ukraine. |
| Ecolab | Chemicals Services Water management Food safety Infection prevention | United States | $7,000,000 | | $7,000,000 | As of April 8, Ecolab has committed more than $7 million worth of Ecolab products to support the humanitarian response in Ukraine. |
| Edgewell Personal Care | Personal care | United States | $150,000 | | $150,000 | Edgewell Personal Care is donating $150,000 to the International Federation of Red Cross and Red Crescent Societies in addition to matching global teammates' individual donations to various organizations. Edgewell is also donating thousands of personal care products to organizations. |
| Eisai (company) | health care | Japan | $129,600 | | $129,600 | The Eisai Group has donated approximately 16 million yen to the Japanese Red Cross Society, the international non-governmental organization Association for Aid and Relief (AAR), Japan and other organizations. |
| EllisDon | Construction | Canada | | $197,500 | $197,500 | EllisDon donated $250,000 to the Canadian Red Cross' Ukraine humanitarian crisis appeal after matching funds raised by the company's employees. |
| Embracer Group | Video games | Sweden | $6,000,000 | | $6,000,000 | Embracer Group has announced that it is donating one million US dollars to help support Ukraine through organisations including the International Committee of the Red Cross, SOS Children's Villages, and ACT Alliance. Embracer Group has pledged $5 million to support Ukrainian refugees and provide humanitarian aid in the region. |
| Enstar Group Limited | Insurance company | United Kingdom | | $50,000 | $50,000 | Staff at Enstar Insurance have donated $50,000 to Ukrainian relief, the majority of the contributions coming from Bermuda. They matched their staff's donations with a $50,000 donation to the Red Cross's Ukrainian relief effort. |
| EPAM Systems | Software engineering | United States | $100,000,000 | | $100,000,000 | EPAM announced an incremental $100 million humanitarian commitment to support its employees in Ukraine and their families. |
| Epic Games | Video games | United States | $140,000,000 | | $140,000,000 | Epic Games raised $144 million total for organizations providing humanitarian aid to people affected by Russia's attack on Ukraine, donating the proceeds that players of its battle-royale game Fortnite spent over a two-week period. Organizations supported include: Direct Relief, UNICEF, United Nations World Food Programme, UNHCR and World Central Kitchen. |
| Eppendorf (company) | Life sciences | Germany | $109,000 | | $109,000 | With the cash donation of €100,000, Eppendorf is supporting the work of UNICEF and its partners in areas where aid to refugees from Ukraine is particularly urgently needed. |
| ESET | Security software | Slovak Republic | $545,000 | | $545,000 | ESET is donating $500,000 EUR through a mixture of direct grant support and donations to NGOs (namely INTEGRA Foundation and UNICEF). |
| Esmark, Inc. | Corporation | United States | $25,000 | $25,000 | $50,000 | Esmark, Inc. has donated $25,000 and pledged an additional $25,000 in matching contributions to aid Ukrainian refugees in Slovakia. The initial donation was made directly to the City of Košice. Esmark will make an additional donation up to US$25,000 to the City of Košice, matching monetary contributions made by Americans to help Ukrainian refugees. |
| EXANTE | investment company | Cyprus | $1,000,000 | | $1,000,000 | EXANTE, an international broker licensed in Cyprus and active in the Ukrainian markets, announced a $1 million donation to UNICEF to help children and families affected by the ongoing war in Ukraine. |
| ExxonMobil | Energy Oil and gas | United States | $10,000,000 | | $10,000,000 | $5 million to the Red Cross for emergency assistance such as food and water, supporting hospitals and health care facilities, repairing water stations, and helping households rehabilitate their damaged homes. $2.25m to International Medical Corps for medical, mental health, and protection services to millions of people affected by the conflict, including refugees. $1m to Project HOPE for direct health care services, equipping clinics and hospitals, and training local health care workers. $1.5m in local impact grants set aside for our European-based affiliates to donate to area non-profit organizations assisting with relief efforts. $250,000 to Counterpart International to build the capacity of NGOs in countries receiving refugees to assist Ukrainian women. |
| Meta Platforms | Social media Social network advertising Consumer electronics | United States | $15,000,000 | | $15,000,000 | Facebook is supporting humanitarian efforts in Ukraine and neighboring countries. This includes $5 million in direct donations to UN agencies and more than a dozen nonprofits, including International Medical Corps who will be using these funds to deploy mobile medical units to Ukraine and Internews to support at-risk journalists and human rights defenders in the region. The company is also donating to UNICEF to scale up lifesaving support for children and families in Ukraine and the region. Facebook will provide $10 million in ad credits, helping nonprofit organizations raise the funds they need to respond and deliver essential information to people impacted by the violence in Ukraine. |
| Fashion Institute of Design & Merchandising | Fashion institute | United States | $298,000 | | $298,000 | FIDM is donating $298,000 worth of clothing and essentials to the Mission of Mercy for Ukraine, a United States-based non-profit supporting the hardest-hit victims of the war in Ukraine. |
| Fast Retailing | Retail | Japan | $10,000,000 | | $10,000,000 | Fast Retailing Co., Ltd., in response to the humanitarian emergency in Ukraine, announced a donation of US$10 million (approx. 1.15 billion yen) to UNHCR, the UN Refugee Agency, to support people forced to flee. The donation will be used by UNHCR to provide such urgent assistance as shelter, psychosocial support and core relief items to affected populations in Ukraine and neighboring countries. |
| FedEx | E-commerce Services Transportation | United States | $1,550,000 | | $1,550,000 | FedEx will provide more than $1 million in in-kind shipping to organizations who are transporting supplies into Ukraine and the surrounding area. FedEx will provide $550,000 in cash donations to non-government organizations in Europe for Ukraine humanitarian relief. |
| Ferrari | Automotive | Italy | $1,090,000 | | $1,090,000 | Ferrari donated one million Euros to support the Ukrainians in need. The funds will be channeled through the Emilia-Romagna Region that, in collaboration with the Red Cross and UNHCR, will fund international humanitarian projects supporting Ukraine as well as local initiatives focusing on the reception of refugees in the Italian region. Additionally, aid will go to the Association Chernobyl of Maranello, Fiorano, Formigine – ONLUS to provide for the needs of the Ukrainians who will be hosted in the area near the company. |
| Finastra | IT | India | $250,000 | | $250,000 | Finastra has pledged to donate $250,000 for families and children suffering most from the devastating impact of the war in Ukraine, through Save the Children's Emergency Fund and accredited local charities. |
| Fox Corporation | Media | United States | $1,000,000 | | $1,000,000 | FOX Corporation donated $1 million to the American Red Cross to support their mission to provide aid and resources including water, medical supplies, housing support and more to the most vulnerable — both within Ukraine and for those who have been forced to leave their homes. |
| Fujifilm | Document solutions Digital imaging Medical imaging Cosmetics Regenerative Medicine Stem Cells Biologics | Japan | $2,000,000 | | $2,000,000 | Fujifilm has announced it will donate medical equipment worth 1 million U.S. dollars, including Fujifilm's portable X-ray system and hand-held wireless ultrasound devices, for medical care provided to the affected population in Ukraine. Fujifilm has announced it will donate $1M to UNHCR and UNICEF for use in supporting humanitarian relief efforts. |
| Funcom | Video games | Norway | $99,000 | | $99,000 | Funcom announced that it will be donating just under £75,000 of proceeds from the release of Conan Chop Chop to a charity providing support to victims of the conflict in Ukraine. |
| Funko | Toys | United States | $100,000 | | $100,000 | Funko donated $100,000 to GlobalGiving to support the Ukraine Relief Fund. |
| Gap Inc. | Retail | United States | $1,000,000 | | $1,000,000 | Gap Inc.'s brands will make a collective in-kind donation of more than $1 million worth of women and children's clothes to the UNHCR for communities in need. |
| GE Healthcare | Health care Pharmaceuticals Electronics Manufacturing | United States | $4,000,000 | | $4,000,000 | GE Healthcare is donating $4 million in life-saving medical equipment, including handheld ultrasound devices, mobile X-ray units, ventilators and patient monitors to provide immediate support to Ukraine and neighboring countries impacted by the violence there. |
| General Motors | Automotive industry | United States | $250,000 | $50,000 | $300,000 | GM North America will donate $250,000 to the International Rescue Committee for the humanitarian crisis in Ukraine. GM will match U.S. employee contributions to specific nonprofits for Ukraine relief up to $50,000. |
| GlaxoSmithKline | Pharmaceutical | United Kingdom | $4,620,741 | $374,654 | $4,995,395 | We have donated £3.25million to the Red Cross and Save the Children who are providing food, water, first aid, medicines, warm clothes and shelter for people in Ukraine and refugees at the border. We have donated £250,000 to Crown Agents (an NGO that has worked with the Ukrainian Ministry of Health (MoH) for the past 20 years) to fund 2,500 medical trauma kits; and are in discussions with them on how to enable continued supply of essential medicines into Ukraine. Through ViiV Healthcare, we are making available significant donations of anti-retroviral medicines to the WHO, national AIDS programmes and NGO partners to support children and adults living with HIV who have been impacted by the conflict. ViiV has also made an initial £200,000 in emergency funds available to existing partners through our Positive Action programme. In addition to our company donation, our employees around the world have donated over £300,000 to Save the Children and the Red Cross, which GSK will match. |
| General Motors Canada | Automotive | Canada | $15,800 | | $15,800 | GM Canada conducted a matching program for employee donations, up to $20,000, to specific nonprofit organizations to assist in humanitarian efforts in Ukraine. |
| GN Group | Facilitates communication | Denmark | $1,000,000 | | $1,000,000 | GN Group donated $1 million to UNICEF to support children impacted by the war in Ukraine. |
| Google.org | Education economic opportunity inclusion crisis response impact challenge | United States | $31,600,000 | $5,000,000 | $36,600,000 | Google.org and Google employees are contributing $15 million in donations and in-kind support to aid relief efforts in Ukraine, including $5 million so far from an employee matching campaign and $5 million in direct grants. The company is also contributing $5 million in advertising credits to help trusted humanitarian and intergovernmental organizations connect people to important sources of aid and resettlement information. Google.org and employees donated US$2.6 million (over PLN 10 million) to the Polish Center for International Aid Foundation (PCPM) - an organization offering immediate, direct help and support in evacuation from conflict zones in Ukraine, providing transport to and from border areas, as well as accommodation and resources. Google.org provided a grant of US$1 million (nearly PLN 4 million) to the Association for Legal Intervention, which is part of a consortium of social organizations working to help refugees and refugees after their arrival in Poland from conflict zones in Ukraine. Google.org created a fund worth US$6.5 million (almost PLN 26 million), which will be allocated to non-governmental organizations to finance programs helping refugees from Ukraine to relocate and adapt to a new environment. Google is investing $10 million in efforts to address the misinformation that is spreading about the realities and facts of the war in Ukraine. This includes new partnerships with think tanks and civil society organizations to conduct region-specific research into misinformation and disinformation, as well as cash grants to support fact-checking networks and nonprofits. Jigsaw, a unit within Google that builds technology to counter threats to open societies, will partner with local experts and academics to develop approaches to both directly counter disinformation and help people more easily identify disinformation. Google has made a US$1.5 million donation in support of the International Rescue Committee's humanitarian relief efforts in Ukraine and around the world. |
| Grammarly | Online text editor browser extension mobile app with grammar checker spell checker plagiarism detector | United States | $5,000,000 | | $5,000,000 | Grammarly will donate $5 million to organizations and funds defending and supporting the people of Ukraine. |
| Grünenthal Pharma AG | Pharmaceutical | Switzerland | $436,000 | | $436,000 | Grünenthal has donated €400.000 to the Red Cross to support humanitarian relief efforts in Ukraine and Eastern Europe. |
| Gucci | Fashion | Italy | $500,000 | | $500,000 | Gucci has donated $500,000 to the UN Refugee Agency (UNHCR) in response to the crisis in Ukraine. |
| H-E-B | Grocery retail | United States | $350,000 | | $350,000 | H-E-B has dedicated $100,000 to Save the Children, an organization working to meet the urgent needs of people affected by the conflict in Ukraine and across the region. The gift will go toward the organization's Ukraine Crisis Relief Fund, which helps provide children and families with immediate aid such as food, water, hygiene kits, baby items, winter coats, and cash assistance. In response to the humanitarian crisis in Ukraine, H-E-B has committed $100,000 to UNICEF. H-E-B has committed $100,000 to the Global FoodBanking Network's Emergency Response Fund, which works with the European Food Banks Federation to deliver food to people inside Ukraine and those fleeing to neighboring countries. H-E-B gifted $50,000 to Ukrainian San Antonio, a nonprofit working to gather supplies and funds for Razom for Ukraine, which provides humanitarian aid in war torn parts of Ukraine. |
| Hendrick Automotive | Vehicle retailer | United States | $200,000 | | $200,000 | Hendrick Automotive has committed $200,000 to Samaritan's Purse for disaster assistance in Ukraine. |
| Henkel | FMCG | Germany | $1,090,000 | | $1,090,000 | Henkel is giving €1 million in combination to the Red Cross and Henkel's Ukrainian employees, in addition for PTO for Henkel employees who volunteer to help refugees or aid organizations at the border |
| Henry Schein | Health care supplies and services | United States | $250,000 | | $250,000 | Henry Schein intends to provide $250,000 worth of product to humanitarian aid organizations for Ukraine relief. |
| Hilco Global | Financial services | United States | $75,000 | $25,000 | $100,000 | Hilco Global is committing $25,000 by matching $1 for each like, repost and share on social media that highlights selected philanthropic organizations. Hilco Global, through its Hilco Helps (www.hilcohelps.com) initiative, is donating the first $75,000 split equally between Sunflower of Peace and United Help Ukraine, as they represent two organizations the company feels are having an immediate impact on Ukraine relief efforts. Hilco Global, through its Hilco Helps (www.hilcohelps.com) initiative, is donating the first $75,000 split equally between Sunflower of Peace and United Help Ukraine, as they represent two organizations the company feels are having an immediate impact on Ukraine relief efforts. |
| Hitachi | Conglomerate | Japan | $3,000,000 | | $3,000,000 | Hitachi Group announced that it will donate $3 million U.S. dollars for the purpose of providing humanitarian aid to those affected in Ukraine and neighboring regions. It includes donations to Japanese Red Cross Society and Japan Committee for UNICEF, in addition to the entire Hitachi Group's donation to the American Red Cross, Singapore Red Cross, and other aid programs in Ukraine. |
| Home Capital Group | Credit Mortgage lending | Canada | $39,500 | | $39,500 | Home Capital Group Inc. and its subsidiary, Home Trust Company, announced a donation of $50,000 CAD to the Canadian Red Cross Ukraine Humanitarian Crisis Appeal in support of humanitarian relief efforts in Ukraine. |
| Hopper | Predicts prices | Canada | $50,000 | | $50,000 | Through Hopper's in-app credit system, Carrot Cash, Hopper plans to fund US$50,000 in total to individuals who are leaving Ukraine and require temporary accommodations in neighboring countries. The company is hoping this booking credit will help ease the financial burden for hundreds of refugees. These individuals will also have access to immediate concierge-level assistance. |
| Hormel Foods | Food processing | United States | $10,000 | | $10,000 | Hormel Foods Corporation has donated $10,000 to Convoy of Hope for Ukraine relief. |
| Hotel Engine | Software company | United States | $35,200 | | $35,200 | Hotel Engine announced a donation of $35,200, or $100 per associate, to the United Nations' World Food Programme, which launched an emergency operation to provide assistance for people seeking refuge. The company is also offering assistance to its associates, clients and contractors who have friends and family fleeing Ukraine. |
| Hyundai Motor Company | Automotive | South Korea | $1,000,000 | | $1,000,000 | Hyundai Motor Group is donating $1 million to the Red Cross to provide humanitarian aid to Ukraine. |
| IBM | Automation Robotics Artificial intelligence Cloud computing Consulting Blockchain Computer hardware Software Quantum computing | United States | $500,000 | | $500,000 | IBM is donating $250,000 to People in Need in Czech Republic for aid in the Ukrainian refugee crisis. IBM is donating $250,000 to Polish Humanitarian Action for aid in the Ukrainian refugee crisis. |
| IHG Hotels & Resorts | Hospitality | United States | $500,000 | | $500,000 | IHG Hotels & Resorts has donated $500,000 to CARE International and the International Federation of Red Cross and Red Crescent Societies in response to the humanitarian crisis in Ukraine. |
| Intel | Semiconductors Computer hardware Autonomous cars Automation Artificial intelligence | United States | $1,200,000 | | $1,200,000 | Intel has launched an employee donation and matching campaign through the Intel Foundation that has already raised over US$1.2m for relief efforts in Ukraine and surrounding areas including Poland, Germany and Romania. |
| Intuit | Enterprise software | United States | $1,000,000 | | $1,000,000 | Intuit is pledging $1 million to the United Nations Refugee Agency (UNHCR) to help support the people of Ukraine. |
| Jefferies Group | Investment services | United States | $1,000,000 | | $1,000,000 | U.S. investment banking firm Jefferies contributed $1 million on Ukrainian Doing Good Global Trading Day . |
| SpaceX | Space industry Communications | United States | $100,000,000 | | $100,000,000 | Delivered Starlink satellite services and donated at least 5,000 terminals to Ukraine. Ukrainian Minister Mykhailo Fedorov estimated SpaceX's contributions as worth more than $100 million. |

== See also ==
- List of foreign aid to Ukraine during the Russo-Ukrainian War
- Fundraising for Ukraine during the 2022 Russian invasion of Ukraine
- Starlink satellite services in Ukraine
- United24
- International sanctions during the 2022 Russian invasion of Ukraine
