= Todai (restaurant) =

Restaurant chain based in the United States

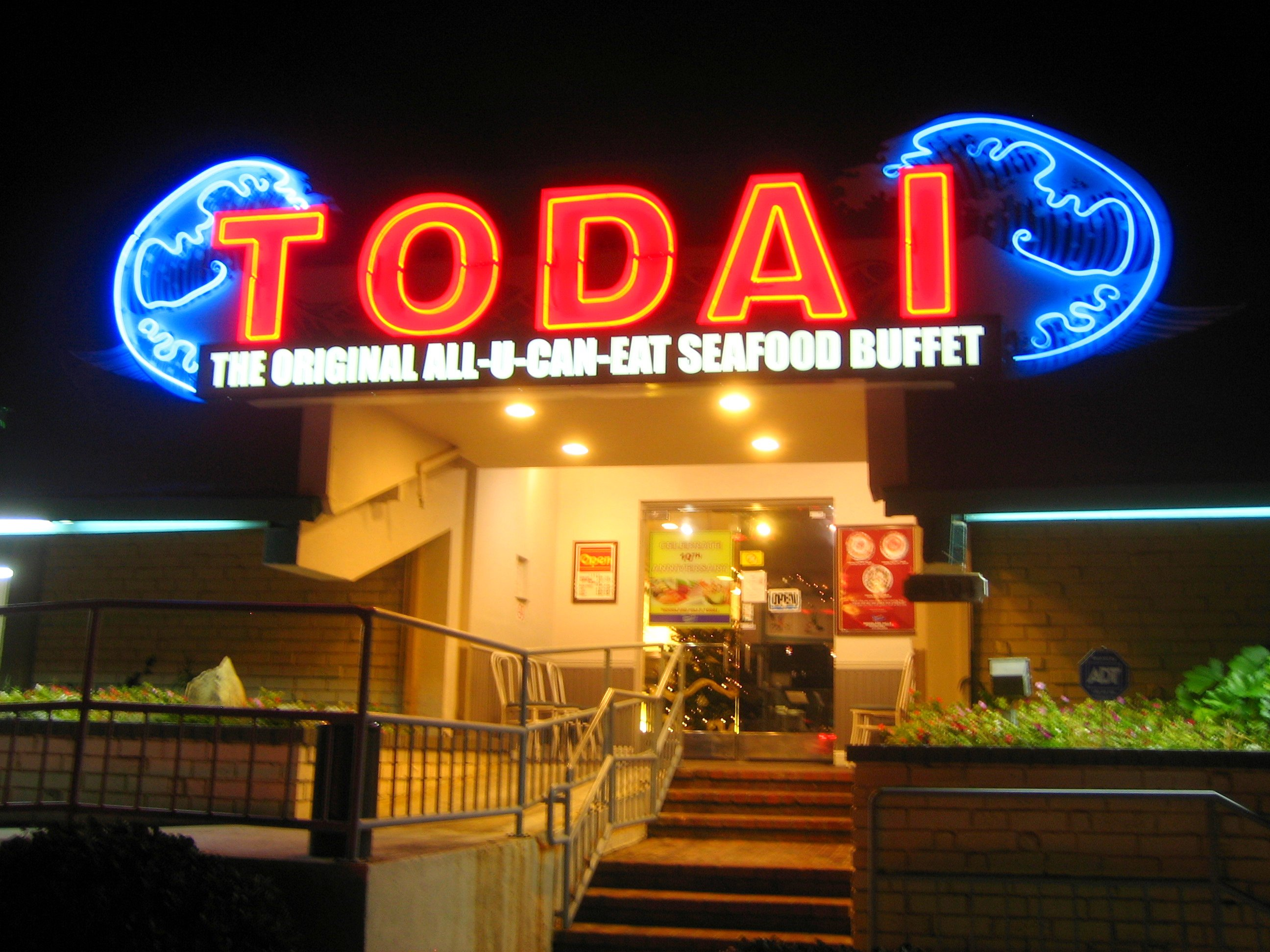
- Todai restaurant in Los Angeles
- Founded: Santa Monica, California (1985; 41 years ago)
- Website: Official website

Todai was a restaurant chain based in the United States. As of 2016, the chain had over 19 restaurants in the United States, 7 restaurants in South Korea and each one restaurant in Hong Kong, Canada, Indonesia, Singapore and Malaysia. On February 15, 2019, their official website with a copyright date of 2009 states, "All Todai USA locations are close for renovation. We plan to reopen in December 2017." As of 2020, there are no Todai branded restaurants in the United States but instead many locations have rebranded to Makino, 100s Seafood Buffet and Haiku.

== History ==
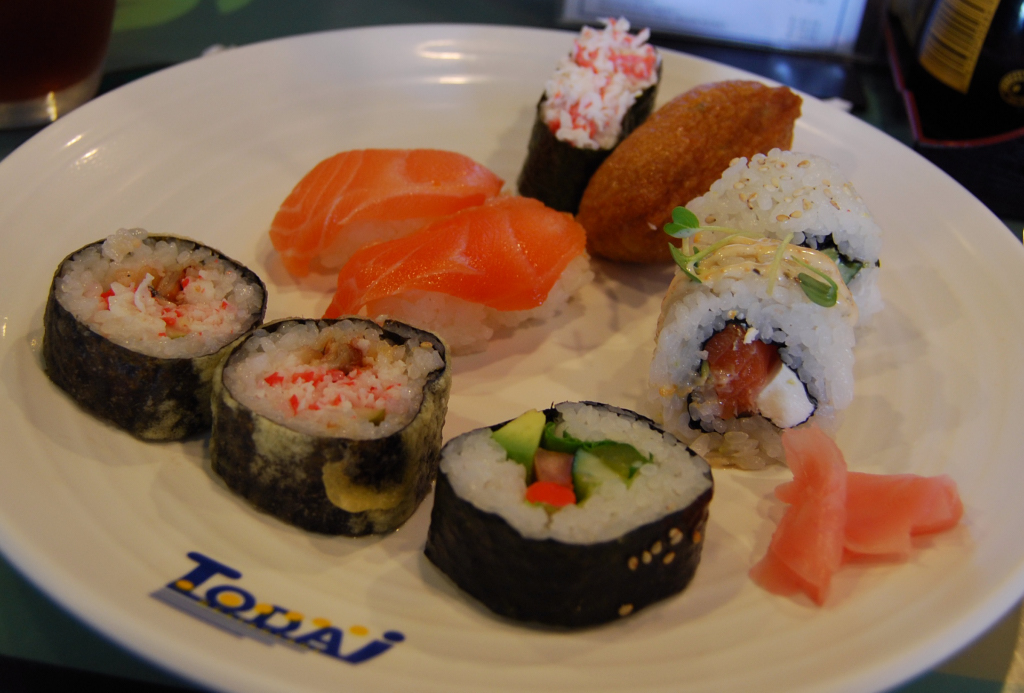
A plate of assorted sushi from Todai

In 1985, two Japanese brothers named Toru and Kaku Makino opened the first Todai location in Santa Monica, California. Toru Makino previously had success with his Japanese restaurant Edokko, which he founded in 1981 in Burbank. Brother Kaku also had experience in the restaurant business; at the age of 20, he had opened a bento shop in Tokyo. The Todai Santa Monica location became popular in the area, so the Makinos kept expanding until they had ten locations in California by the late 1990s. In 1998, Korean investment group Meramia, under Hans Kim, purchased a majority stake in Todai. Kim, a Korean engineer and regular customer at the Santa Monica location, had previously bought a Todai location in Studio City, Los Angeles in 1995. The Makino brothers reportedly sold their stake in the late 1990s to early 2000s.

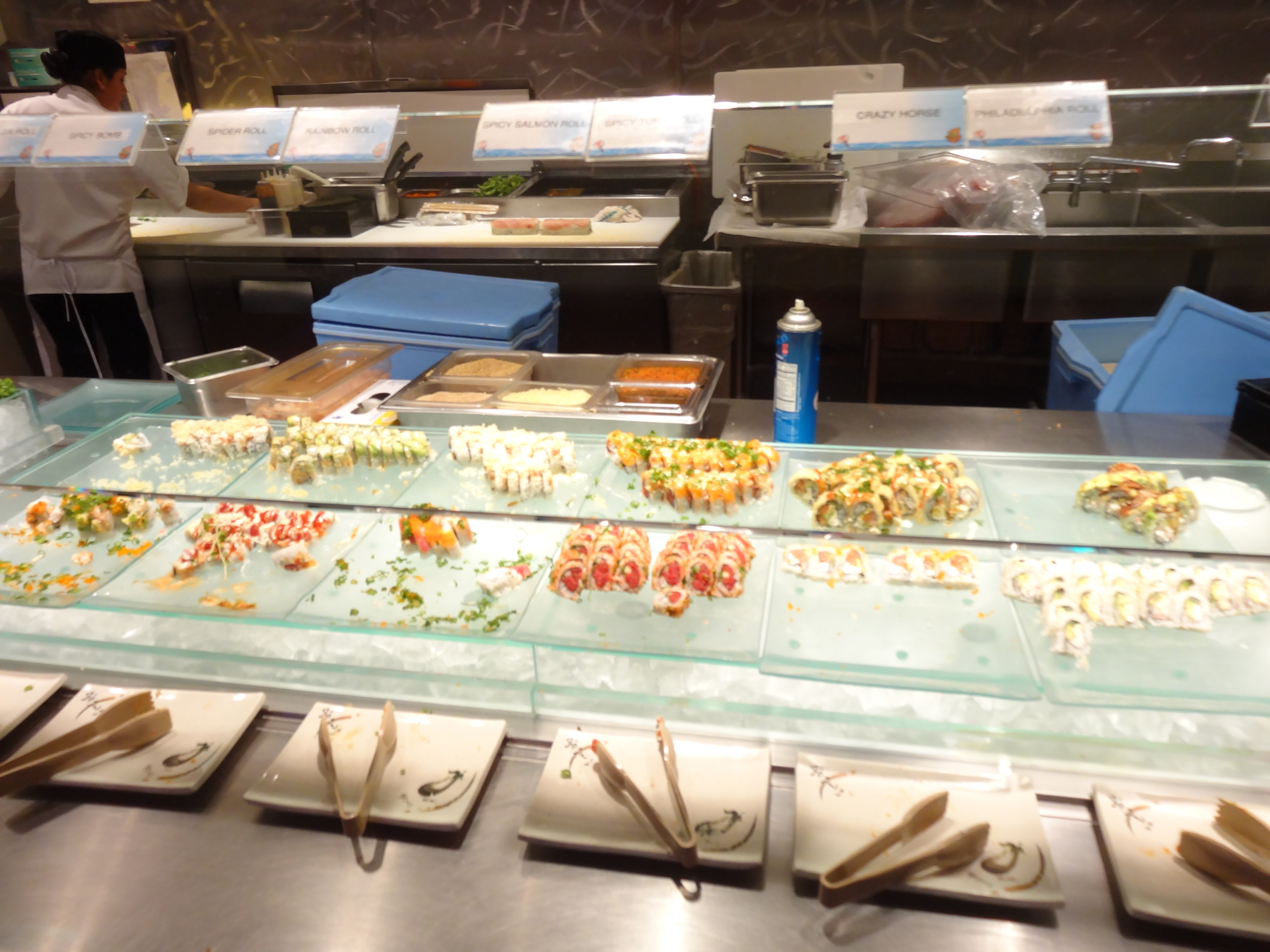
The buffet line at the Planet Hollywood Todai in Las Vegas

With Kim at the helm, in 1998 Todai opened its first company-owned location in San José, expanding to Waikiki in December 1999. They also opened the first international location in Hong Kong in 2003. Todai eventually expanded to Kim's native country, as the company opened its first Korean location in 2006 in Seoul. An offshoot, Todai Korea, was founded in 2008, running seven restaurants in the Seoul area by 2015. That year, Shinhan Investment Corp. announced that they would invest 25 billion won (US$21.8 million) into Todai Korea.

In August 2018, chefs at a Todai Korea location in Pyeongchon-dong, Anyang alleged that the restaurant had told them to take uneaten food, and reuse them as ingredients for other sushi rolls and dishes. While the Ministry of Food and Drug Safety confirmed that Todai did not break any laws, Kim acknowledged that the restaurant had indeed asked its chefs to carry out the order, and apologized, vowing not to continue the practice. The Ministry of Food and Drug Safety later tightened its rules in October of that year, banning restaurants for re-purposing leftover food, except for specific items like raw vegetables if washed again.

== See also ==
- List of seafood restaurants
