= Archer Hotels =

Archer Hotel
- Industry: Hotels
- Founded: May 28, 2014; 12 years ago in New York City, United States
- Number of locations: 9 (2025)
- Parent: LodgeWorks Partners LP
- Website: archerhotel.com

Archer Hotel is a collection of branded hotels in the United States owned by LodgeWorks Partners LP.

== History ==
Archer Hotel is owned by LodgeWorks Partners LP, a hotel development and management firm based in Wichita, Kansas. The first Archer Hotel was built in New York City's Garment District at 45 W. 38th Street and opened to the public on May 28, 2014. The building has 22 stories and was designed by Peter Poon Architects. The rooms were designed by Glen Coben of Glen & Co. Architecture.

Archer Hotel has locations in New York City, New York; Austin, Texas; Napa, California; Burlington, Massachusetts; Florham Park, New Jersey; Redmond, Washington; Tysons, Virginia; Falls Church, Virginia; Old Town Alexandria, Virginia.

== Archer persona ==
LodgeWorks created the Archer brand with Phillips + Co and 50,000 feet, a design firm. The company describes Archer as a "persona" and a design concept that is present in each Archer location.
