= List of companies that applied sanctions during the Russo-Ukrainian war =

The first round of sanctions was applied in March 2014, after the Russian annexation of Crimea and its support for the war in Donbas. The second active round of applied sanctions started in February 2022, after the full-scale Russian invasion of Ukraine.

== List ==
Company	Industry	Origin	Suspended services	Start date
3M	Conglomerate	United States	all operations in Russia	2022
Accenture	Consulting	Ireland	closing business in Russia	2022
Activision Blizzard	Video game	United States	all sales in Russia	2022
Advanced Micro Devices	Semiconductor company	United States	Chip sales to Russia	2022
Adidas	Clothing	Germany	partnership with Russian Football Union	2 March 2022
AerCap	Aircraft leasing	Ireland	cease lending to Russians	2022
Airbnb	Hospitality	United States	All operations	2022
Airbus	Aerospace manufacturer	France	Stopped providing support services to Russian Airlines Continues to purchase titanium from Russian Federation	2 March 2022
Alaska Airlines	Airline	United States	suspend Russian partnerships	2022
Alcoa	Metals	United States	suspend all business with Russia	2022
Allianz	Financial services	Germany	curtail Russian access to capital markets	2022
Amadeus IT Group	Software	Spain	Distribution service with Russia's Aeroflot and new planned commercial projects in Russia	2022
Amazon	Internet	United States	Amazon Web Services; Amazon Prime Video	2 March 2022
American Airlines	Airlines	United States	Severed all ties with Aeroflot and S7 Airlines and suspended interline agreements.	2 March 2022
American Express	payment card services	United States	Suspended all operations in Russia and Belarus	2022
Amway	Direct selling	United States		2022
Anheuser-Busch	alcoholic beverages	Belgium	halt all shipments to Russia	2022
ApiX-Drive	Technology	Estonia	Complete cessation of work with users from Russia	2022
Apple	Computer hardware and software	United States	Halt all product sales: App Store, Mac App Store, Apple Developer, Apple Pay	17 January 2015; 1 March 2022 (Apple Pay, retail)
Asda	Retail	United Kingdom	remove products from Russia	2022
ASOS	Online retail	United Kingdom	Retail sales stopped	2 March 2022
Assicurazioni Generali	Insurance	Italy	exit Russia completely	2022
ASUS	Computers	Taiwan	Halt Russia product shipments	14 March 2022
Aston Martin	Luxury cars	United Kingdom	Retail	2 March 2022
Atlas Copco	Industrial equipment	Sweden	halt all shipments to Russia	2022
Autodesk	Software	United States	Business in Russia	2022
Avast	Software	Czechia	Stopped sales to Russia and suspended all activities	2022
Avid Technology	Technology	United States	all sales and support for all customers, users and resellers in Russia and Belarus	2022
Bain	Management consulting	United States	suspend consulting for all Russian government entities	2022
Baker McKenzie	Law firm	United States	suspend services for all Kremlin entities	2022
Balenciaga	Luxury fashion	France	Russian revenue streams	2022
BASF	Chemical industry	Germany	suspend new Russian relationships	2022
BBC	Broadcasting	United Kingdom	suspend all operations in Russia	2022
Bentley	Luxury cars	United Kingdom	Exports to Russia	2022
BlackRock	Investment management	United States	curtail Russian access to capital markets	2022
Bloomberg	Technology, Financial technology and mass media	United States	pull back journalists from Russia	2022
BMW	Luxury vehicles and motorcycles	Germany	Exporting cars to Russia.	2022
BNP Paribas	Financial services	France	curtail Russian access to capital markets	2022
Boeing	Designs, manufactures, and sells airplanes, rotorcraft, rockets, satellites, telecommunications equipment, and missiles	United States	Suspended parts and maintenance support for Russian airlines as well as its operations in Moscow Suspended purchases of titanium from Russia	2022
Bokaldo Group	Financial services	United Kingdom	Stopped accepting Russian capital.	2022
Bolt	Vehicle for hire, micromobility, car-sharing, and food delivery services	Estonia	Ties with Russian companies	2022
Bombardier	Aerospace manufacturer	Canada	restrict new Russian business	2022
BooHoo Group	Online retail	United Kingdom	halt all shipments to Russia	2022
Booking.com	Travel	Netherlands	operations in Russia	2022
BCG	Management consulting	United States	suspend all consulting in Russia	2022
BP	Oil and gas	United Kingdom	Stake in Russian oil giant Rosneft.	2022
Budějovický Budvar	Brewer	Czechia	Stopped taking new orders from Russia	2022
Bridgestone	Tyre manufacturer	Japan	Suspended manufacturing and investment in Russia.	14 March 2022
Burberry	Fashion retail	United Kingdom	halt all shipments to Russia	2022
Cadillac	Automobile manufacture	United States	Business to Russia	2022
Canada Goose	Clothing	Canada	halt all shipments to Russia	2022
Cannes Festival	Film Festival	France	Ban Russian Delegations	2022
Cargill	Grain exporter	United States	Cease exporting grain from Russia.	1 July 2023
Carlsberg	Brewer	Denmark	Exports, New Investments Into Russia	4 March 2022
Carnival	Hospitality, Tourism	United States	drop Russia from itineraries	2022
Cartier	Luxury goods	France	operations in Russia	2022
Caterpillar	Engineering equipment	USA	Russian operation sold.	2023
Chanel	Luxury goods	France	sales in Russia	2022
Chevrolet	Automobile	United States	Vehicle exports to Russia	2022
Cisco	Technology	United States	All business operations	2022
CMA CGM	Container shipping	France	halt all shipments to Russia	2022
The Coca-Cola Company	Beverage corporation	United States	Sales in Russia	2022
Cogent Communications	Telecommunications	United States	cut all internet to Russia	2022
Continental AG	Tyre manufacturer	Germany	Sold Russian factory.	1 May 2023
Credit Suisse	Financial services	Switzerland	curtail Russian access to capital markets	2022
Coursera	Online course provider	United States	Ceased all content for Russian university and industry partners including courses, paid course experiences and collecting payment from any learners or institutions in Russia,	2022
Crunchyroll (Funimation)	Anime, manga, Japanese media	United States; Japan	Jointly owned by Japanese conglomerate Sony, through its subsidiaries Sony Pictures Television and Sony Music Entertainment Japan via Aniplex.; Services from Wakanim and Crunchyroll EMEA are suspended from Russia. All new anime releases halted in the country.	10 March 2022
Daimler Truck	Commercial vehicle manufacturer	Germany	Exports to Russia and production in Russia	2022
Dassault Aviation	Aircraft manufacturer	France	Falcon Deliveries	2022
David Chipperfield Architects	Architecture	Worldwide	working on their projects in Russia	2022
DB Schenker	Logistics and freight transport	Germany	halt all shipments to Russia	2022
Deezer	Music streaming	France	Subscription in Russia	2022
Dell	Computer hardware	United States	Suspended product sales in Russia	31 August 2022
Deloitte	Professional services	United Kingdom	separating Russia operations	2022
Delta Air Lines	Airline	United States	suspend agreement with Aeroflot	2022
Dentons	Law firm	Worldwide	suspend services for all Kremlin entities	2022
DHL	Logistics	Germany	Deliveries to Russia	2022
Diageo	Beverages	United Kingdom	halt all shipments to Russia	2022
DirecTV	Multichannel video programming distributor	United States	cut Kremlin backed TV networks	2022
Disney	Entertainment and media	United States	All theatrical releases in Russia	2022
DJI	Commercial drones	China	Pauses service in Russia due to their product used in military offensive.	1 April 2022
Domino's Pizza	Fast food	United States	DP Eurasia franchise in Russia being put into bankruptcy.	1 August 2023
DSV	Transport and logistics	Denmark	halt all shipments to Russia	2022
DXC Technology	Technology	United States	exit the Russian market	2022
eBay	Internet	United States		2022
ETS	Language	United States	suspend testing in Russia and Belarus	2022
Ekaterra	Tea producer	Netherlands	Lipton and Brooke Bond tea maker withdrew from Russia and ceased production.	2022
Electrolux	Appliance manufacturer	Sweden	Sold business to local management and exited Russia.	30 September 2022
Electronic Arts	Video games	United States	all product sales FIFA, NHL, Need for Speed, Sims, Apex Legends, Battlefield Exclude Russia from FIFA 22 and NHL 22; Russia also excluded from 2023 games.	2022
Embraer	Aviation	Brazil	The company stopped providing maintenance and technical support services to Russian customers	3 March 2022
Eni	Energy	Italy	divest Russian pipeline	2022
ESRI	Software	United States	Esri and its distributor Esri CIS are no longer selling any products and services to Russia and Belarus	2022
Equinor	Energy	Norway	exit joint ventures in Russia Left Russia in September 2022 after selling assets to Rosneft for one euro	2022
Ericsson	Networking and telecommunications	Sweden	Deliveries to Russia	2022
Ernst & Young	Professional services	United Kingdom	separating Russia operations	2022
Essity	Hygiene and health company	Sweden	Sold Russian business.	30 June 2023
Etsy	E-commerce	United States	Canceled all balances owed by sellers in Ukraine on its platform, totaling almost $4 million in listing fees	2022
Eurovision	Song Contest	(Europe) European Countries	Banned Russia from competing	2022
Expedia	Online Travel	United States	Ceased sales to and from Russia	2022
ExxonMobil	Oil and gas corporation	United States	Operations at Sakhalin-1, make no new investments in Russia Left Russia completely on 17 October 2022 after Russian president Vladimir Putin expropriated its properties	2022
EPAM	Technology	United States	Providing services to customers in Russia	2022
ESET	Security software	Slovakia	Stopping all new sales to any individuals, businesses and organizations in Russia and Belarus.	2022
Facebook	Networking service	United States	Banned the Russian state media channels	2022
Farfetch	E-commerce	United Kingdom	halt all shipments to Russia	2022
Fast Retailing	Clothing	Japan	Uniqlo	2022
Fazer	Food industry	Finland	Export to Russia	2022
FedEx	Transportation	United States	Delivery service	2022
Ferrari	Manufacturer of sports cars	Italy	Suspended businesses with Russia	2022
FIFA and UEFA	Sport	Worldwide	Suspend Russia from international football	2022
Fleetcor	Payment products and services	United States	Sold Russian business.	2023
Ford	Automotive	United States	Shut down its three plants in Russia in 2019 as part of an effort to turn around its struggling European operation.	2019
Formula 1	Sport	United Kingdom	Prohibition to compete under the flag of Russia	2022
Games Workshop	Entertainment	United Kingdom	Sales suspended within Russia and Belarus	16 March 2022
Gazprom-Media	Media	Russia	NTV withdrawn from Crimea	1 January 2015
General Electric	Conglomerate	United States	Halt supply of parts to Aeroflot; Stops servicing gas turbines.	2022; 2023
General Motors	Automotive	United States	Some business in Russia	28 February 2022
Geodis	Rail transport	France	halt all shipments to Russia	2022
GitLab	Software	Worldwide	New business in Russia and Belarus	11 March 2022
GlobalFoundries	Semiconductors	United States	halt all shipments to Russia	2022
Globus	Department Store	Switzerland	Terminated the import and selling of Russian goods	2 March 2022
GoDaddy	Internet	United States	Domain registering and web hosting	2022
Goldman Sachs	Investment bank	United States	all operations in Russia	2022
Google	Internet	United States	Google Chrome, Google Play, Google Pay, AdSense	30 January 2015; 1 Mar 2022 (Google Pay)
Grammarly	Software	United States	Service in Russia and Belarus	2022
Grant Thornton	Professional services	Worldwide	closing business in Russia	2022
Guardian Industries	Glass company	United States	Sold Russian subsidiary.	31 July 2022
Harley Davidson	Motorcycle manufacture	United States	Business in Russia	1 March 2022
Heineken	Lager Beer	Netherlands	beer exports and investment projects in Russia sold seven breweries for €1 to Arnest.	2022; 2023
Hempel Group	Specialist paints and coatings	Denmark	Sold its Russian business.	13 July 2023
Hewlett-Packard	Computer hardware	United States	Suspended product shipments to Russia. Exits Russia	2 March 2022; 1 June 2022
Henkel	Chemical and consumer goods	Germany	Investments in Russia	2022
Hermès	Luxury goods	France	Suspended its activities in Russia	2022
Hilton	Hospitality	United States	Suspended development activity and closed all offices in Russia	2022
H&M	Clothing	Sweden	Sales in Russia	2022
Honda	Automotive	Japan	Exports of cars and motorcycles to Russia	2022
Hapag-Lloyd	Marine transportation and container shipping	Germany	halt all shipments to Russia	2022
HMM	Container shipping	South Korea	halt all shipments to Russia	2022
HSBC	Banking	United Kingdom	curtail Russian access to capital markets	2022
Hyundai	Automotive	South Korea	Production at its St Petersburg plant in Russia	2022
IBM	Technology	United States	all operations in Russia	2022
iHerb	Online retail	United States	all operations in Russia	2022
IKEA	Retail chain	Sweden	Suspended all its stores in Russia and halted its sourcing in Russia and Belarus.	2022
Inditex	Retail	Spain	Permanently suspended its activity in the 502 stores (of which 86 are Zara) and on the country's online channel Zara Home, Bershka, Massimo Dutti, Oysho, Pull&Bear, Stradivarius, Uterqüe, Lefties	2022
Intercontinental Exchange	Business services, financial services, financial markets and technology	United States	curtail Russian access to capital markets	2022
International Cycling Union	Sport	Worldwide	ban on all Russian competition	2022
International Ice Hockey Federation	Sport	Worldwide	ban on all Russian competition	2022
International Skating Union	Sport	Worldwide	ban on all Russian competition	2022
International Tennis Federation	Sport	Worldwide	suspend Russian partnerships	2022
International Weightlifting Federation	Sport	Worldwide	ban on all Russian competition	2022
IOC	Sport	Worldwide	ban Russian athletes from competing	2022
Instagram	Social media	United States	Demoting posts from Russian state-media	2022
Intel	Technology	United States	Chip sales to Russia	2022
Jablotron	Security systems	Czechia	Stops sales to Russia	2022
Jaguar Land Rover	Automotive	United Kingdom	Deliveries of Russia-bound vehicles	2022
Japan Tobacco	Tobacco	Japan	all operations in Russia	2022
JetBrains	Technology	Czechia	sales and R&D in Russia and Belarus	2022
JD Sports	Retail	United Kingdom	suspend operations in Russia	2022
JDE Peet's	Coffee producer	Netherlands	Douwe Egberts, L'OR, Kenco, Tassimo and many other brands will no longer be imported into Russia.	31 December 2022
Jooble	Web	Ukraine	Operation in Russia and Belarus	2022
JPMorgan Chase	Financial services	United States	curtail Russian access to capital markets	2022
JYSK	Retail chain	Denmark	Work in Russia	2022
Kering	Luxury goods	France	All product sales, Balenciaga, Bottega Veneta, Gucci, Alexander McQueen, Yves Saint Laurent	2022
KingsIsle Entertainment	Internet	United States	Wizard101, Pirate101	3 February 2021
Kinross Gold	Metals and mining	Canada	suspend operations in Russia	2022
Korean Air	Airline	South Korea	no flying over Russian airspace	2022
KPMG	Professional services network	Netherlands	separating Russia operations	2022
Kuehne + Nagel	Transport and logistics	Switzerland	suspend all shipments to Russia	2022
Kyivstar	Communications	Ukraine		26 February 2022
Lamborghini	Manufacturer of sports cars	Italy	Suspended businesses with Russia.	2022
Lanxess	Chemicals	Germany	Sold business to Vladimir Yakushin.	31 May 2023
Lego	Toys	Denmark	Shipments of toy bricks to Russia	2022
Levi Strauss & Co	Clothing	United States	commercial operations in Russia	2022
Life:)	Communications	Ukraine		26 February 2022
Linklaters	Law firm	United Kingdom	suspend operations in Russia	2022
Live Nation Entertainment	Entertainment	United States	halt all operations in Russia	2022
London Stock Exchange Group	Financial services	United Kingdom	curtail Russian access to capital markets	2022
Lumen Technologies	Telecommunications	United States	suspend new Russian relationships	2022
Luxoft	DXC Technology company	United States	Russian business sold.	30 April 2022
LVMH	Luxury goods	France	All product sales, Moët & Chandon, Hennessy, Louis Vuitton, Givenchy, Christian Dior, Kenzo, Bulgari, Marc Jacobs, Stella McCartney, Loewe, Fendi	2022
Mango	Retail	Spain	Spanish retailer Mango closed all its 126 shops in Russia.	2022
Marks & Spencer	Retail	United Kingdom	Stopped shipments to Turkish franchisee's Russian business	2022
MasterCard	Banking	United States	network services in Russia	2022
Match Group	Internet and technology company	United States of America	Tinder and other apps owner withdrawing completely from Russia.	30 June 2023
Mazda	Automotive	Japan	halt all shipments to Russia	2022
Maersk	Shipping	Denmark	Deliveries	2022
Marugame Seimen	Foodservice	Japan	Stores in Russia closed by March 31, 2022.	31 March 2022
McDonald's	Fast food corporation	United States	Sales in Russia	2022
McKinsey & Company	Management consulting	Worldwide	Business with any government entity in Russia	2022
MSC Mediterranean Shipping Company	Transportation	Switzerland	halt all shipments to Russia	2022
Mercedes-Benz Group	Vehicle manufacturer	Germany	Exports to Russian and production in Russia	2022
Meta	Social media, Social network advertising, Consumer electronics, Virtual reality	United States	suspend Russian advertising	2022
Metso	Industrial machinery	Finland	halt all shipments to Russia	2022
Meyn Food Processing Technology	Poultry processing equipment	Netherlands	Ceases selling new machines and suspends spare parts servicing in Russia.	2023
Michelin	Tyre manufacturer	France	Sold subsidiary and exited Russia.	30 May 2023
Michelin Guide	Guide	France	Restaurant recommendations in Russia	2022
Microsoft	Technology corporation	United States	Sales in Russia. Suspends licences for Russian companies.	2022; 30 September 2023
Moncler	Fashion	Italy	suspend operations in Russia	2022
Moody's Investors Service	Investors Service	United States	commercial operations in Russia.	5 March 2022
Morrisons	Retail	United Kingdom	remove products from Russia	2022
MSCI	Financial services	United States	curtail Russian access to capital markets	2022
Nasdaq	Stock exchange	United States	curtail Russian access to capital markets	2022
Netflix	Streaming service and production	United States	service in Russia	2022
Niantic	Gaming	United States	service in Russia and Belarus	11 March 2022
NHL	Hockey League	Canada United States	relationships with "business partners in Russia	28 February 2022
Nike	Retail chain	United States	Suspended operations in Russia.	2022
Nintendo	Video games	Japan	Sale of games in Russia; Leaves Russia completely	1 March 2022; 2023
Nippon Sheet Glass	Glass company	Japan	Sold Russian subsidiary and exited Russia.	1 June 2023
Nissan	Automotive	Japan	halt all shipments to Russia	2022
Nokia	Telecommunications, technology	Finland	Deliveries to Russia	2022
Nokian Tyres	Tyre manufacturer	Finland	Sold Russian business and ended all business in Russia.	31 March 2023
Norsk Hydro	Metals	Norway	freeze Russian investments	2022
Nvidia	Computer hardware	United States	Product sales	2022
OneWeb	Communications	United Kingdom	Use of Russian rockets	2022
OMV	Oil, gas, petrochemistry and recycling	Austria	divest Russian projects	2022
Oracle	Technology	United States	All operations in Russia	2019
Panasonic	Multinational conglomerate	Japan	Transactions with Russia	2022
Papa John's	Restaurant chain	United States	Papa John's International announced that it had suspended operation of its stores in Russia on March 9, 2022. One American franchise owner plans to continue operating 190 stores.	2022
Paramount Global	Entertainment	United States	Film distribution in Russia	2022
PayPal	Banking	United States	Suspended its services in Russia	2022
Payoneer	Banking	United States	the ability for new customers in Russia to use Payoneer services	2022
Paysera	Communications	Lithuania	Process transactions in Russian roubles	2022
PepsiCo	food, snack, and beverage manufacturer	United States	Exports of soft drinks to Russia	2022
Plzenský Prazdroj	Brewer	Czechia	Stopped taking new orders from Russia	2022
Porsche	manufacturer and marketer of luxury cars	Germany	Exports to Russia	2022
PostNord	Postal services	Denmark; Sweden	All mail and packages addressed to or from Belarus and Russia will be returned to the sender	2022
Prada	Fashion	Italy	All its retail operations in Russia	2022
PricewaterhouseCoopers	Professional services	United Kingdom	separating Russia operations	2022
Puma	Clothing	Germany	Operation of all its stores	2022
PVH	Clothing	United States	product sales Tommy Hilfiger, Calvin Klein, Warner's all commercial activities in Russia and Belarus	7 March 2022
R&A	Sport	Worldwide except the United States and Mexico	ban on all Russian competition	2022
Rehau Group	Automotive	Switzerland	Sold Russian business to local management.	31 May 2022
Remitly Global	Financial services	United States	stop accepting new users in Russia	2022
Renault	Automotive	France	close Russian plants	2022
Restream	Software	United States	Bans Russian users	2022
Richemont	Luxury goods	Switzerland	suspend all operations in Russia	2022
Rockstar Games	Video games	United States	selling games in Russia	2022
Roku	Consumer electronics and broadcast media	United States	remove Kremlin-linked propaganda and ads	2022
Rolls-Royce	Automotive	United Kingdom	halt all shipments to Russia	2022
S&P	Financial services	United States	curtail Russian access to capital markets	2022
Sabre Corporation	Software	United States	Distribution service with Russia's Aeroflot, crippling carrier's ability to sell seats	2022
Sainsbury's	Retail	United Kingdom	remove products from Russia	2022
Salesforce	Software	United States	Exiting relationships with resellers and end customers.	2022
Samsung	Business conglomerate	South Korea	Shipments to Russia	2022
Sandvik	Engineering	Sweden	halt all operations in Russia	2022
SAP	software	Germany	business in Russia	2022
Scania	Commercial vehicle manufacturer	Sweden	Business in Russia	2022
Schaeffler Group	Rolling element bearings	Germany	Business in Russia sold.	2023
S-Group	Retail	Finland	All Russian operations	2022
Shell	Oil and gas	United Kingdom	Partnerships with state-controlled Gazprom, including the Sakhalin-II liquefied natural gas facility and its involvement in the Nord Steam 2 pipeline project	2022
Sidley Austin	Law firm	United States	suspend services for all Kremlin entities	2022
Siemens	Industrial manufacturing	Germany	New business in Russia	2022
Sigma Group	Industrial manufacturing	Czechia	Stops business in Russia	2022
SKF	Ball bearings	Sweden	Sold business and exited Russia.	30 April 2022
Škoda	Automotive	Czechia	Production of vehicles in Russia	2022
Smurfit Kappa	Packaging	Ireland	Sale of Russian operation to local management.	1 March 2023
Snapchat	Technology	United States	Banning ad sales in Russia	2022
Société Générale	Financial services	France	curtail Russian access to capital markets	2022
Sony	Multinational conglomerate	Japan	Film releases in Russia Sales of PlayStation consoles and software in Russia.	2022
Spotify	audio streaming and media services	Sweden	Payment for subscription	2022
Staropramen	Brewer	Czechia	Stopped taking new orders from Russia	2022
State Street	Financial services	United States	curtail Russian access to capital markets	2022
Starbucks	Chain of coffeehouses and roastery reserves	United States	Sales in Russia	2022
Stellantis	Automotive	Netherlands	suspends all shipments to Russia	30 April 2022
Subaru	Automotive	Japan	halt all shipments to Russia	2022
Supercell	Video games	Finland	Removed all games from app stores in Russia and Belarus.	2022
Swarovski	Glassware and jewelry	Austria	Sales in Russia	2022
Swatch	Watchmaking	Switzerland	suspend direct operations in Russia	2022
SWIFT	Financial telecommunication	Belgium	Bars 7 Russian banks from SWIFT	2022
Sylvamo	Pulp and paper	United States	suspend operations in Russia	2022
Tetra Pak	Food packaging	Sweden	sold business to local management and exited Russia.	30 August 2022
TikTok	Networking service	China	service in Russia	2022
TJ Maxx	Retail	United States	divest Familia subsidiary	2022
TotalEnergies	Energy: Oil and gas	France	halt new investment in Russia	2022
Toyota	Automotive	Japan	halt all shipments to Russia	2022
Trafigura	Trading	Singapore	Freezes investments in Russia	2022
Tripadvisor	Travel company	United States	remove Kremlin-linked propaganda and ads	2022
TSMC	Technology	Taiwan	chip sales to Russia	2022
Twitch	Live streaming service	United States	Bans Russian state media	2022
Twitter	Microblogging and social networking	United States	Demotes Russian State media content	2022
Uber	Technologies	United States	Cuts ties with Russian companies	2022
UEFA	Champions League football competition	Worldwide	Suspends Russia until further notice	2022
Unilever	Packaged goods	United Kingdom	issued a statement "We are deeply shocked by the senseless acts of violence being perpetrated against the innocent people of Ukraine and we condemn the Russian state's invasion" but did not provide any additional information about its operations in Russia.	2022
Under Armour	Textile and sports equipment	United States	halt all shipments to Russia	2022
United Airlines	Airline	United States	no flying over Russian airspace	2022
UPS	Logistics	United States	Delivery service	2022
Universal Pictures	Film production and distribution	United States	Pauses theatrical releases in Russia	2022
Upwork	Workforce management	United States	Suspended service in Russia and Belarus.	1 May 2022
Valero Energy	Oil	United States	suspend all purchases of Russian crude oil	2022
Valve	Internet and gaming	United States	Steam *Inaccurate Source?*	1 November 2015
VELUX	Glass company	Denmark	Closed operations in Russia and Belarus.	31 March 2022
VEON	Mobile network operator	Netherlands	Russian business sold to local management.	31 October 2023
Visa	Financial services	United States	All Russia Operations	2022
Vodafone	Mobile operator	United Kingdom	Cut partnership with Russian MTS.	3 March 2022
Volkswagen	Motor vehicle manufacturer	Germany	Exports to Russia	2022
Volvo	Manufacturer of luxury vehicles	Sweden	Sales and production in Russia	2022
Vontobel	Private bank	Switzerland	Ended business with Russian clients in 2022.	2022
Waitrose	Supermarket	United Kingdom	remove products from Russia	2022
Warner Bros	Mass media	United States	Film releases in Russia	2022
Western Union	Financial services	United States	Money transfers to Russia	2022
White & Case	Law firm	United States	suspend services for all Kremlin entities	2022
Wintershall	Oil and natural gas producer	Germany	Stops payments to Russia, writes off $1.1 bln Nord Stream 2 loan	2022
Wise PLC	Financial services	United Kingdom	suspend Russian partnerships	2022
World Athletics		Worldwide	ban on all Russian competition	2022
WBO, IBF, WBC, WBA	Sport (boxing)	Worldwide	Cut off Russia from title fights	2022
World Federation of Exchanges			suspend all Russian members and affiliates	2022
World Rugby		Worldwide	ban on all Russian competition	2022
WPP	Communications, advertising, and public relations	United Kingdom	suspend all operations in Russia	2022
WWE	Professional wrestling and streaming media	United States	halt all operations in Russia	2022
YOOX	Fashion and leisure	Italy	halt all shipments to Russia	2022
YouTube	Social media	United States	Bans Russian state media channels	2022
Zaha Hadid Architects	Architecture	United Kingdom	Stops working on their projects in Russia	2022
Žďas	Industrial manufacturing	Czechia	Stops business in Russia	2022
Zetor	Agricultural machinery	Czechia	Stops sales to Russia	2022
ZF Group	Car parts manufacturer	Germany	Exports to Russia and production in Russia	2022
Zoom	Communications	United States	Restricts use of its software for Russian companies with state assets	2022

== See also ==
- Boycott Russian Films
- Do not buy Russian goods!
- Boycott of Russia and Belarus
- International sanctions during the Russo-Ukrainian War
- List of foreign aid to Ukraine during the Russo-Ukrainian War
- Magnitsky Act
- Reactions to the 2022 Russian invasion of Ukraine
- Remember about the Gas – Do not buy Russian goods!
- Russian financial crisis (2014–present)
- International Sponsors of War
