= Al Kout Mall =

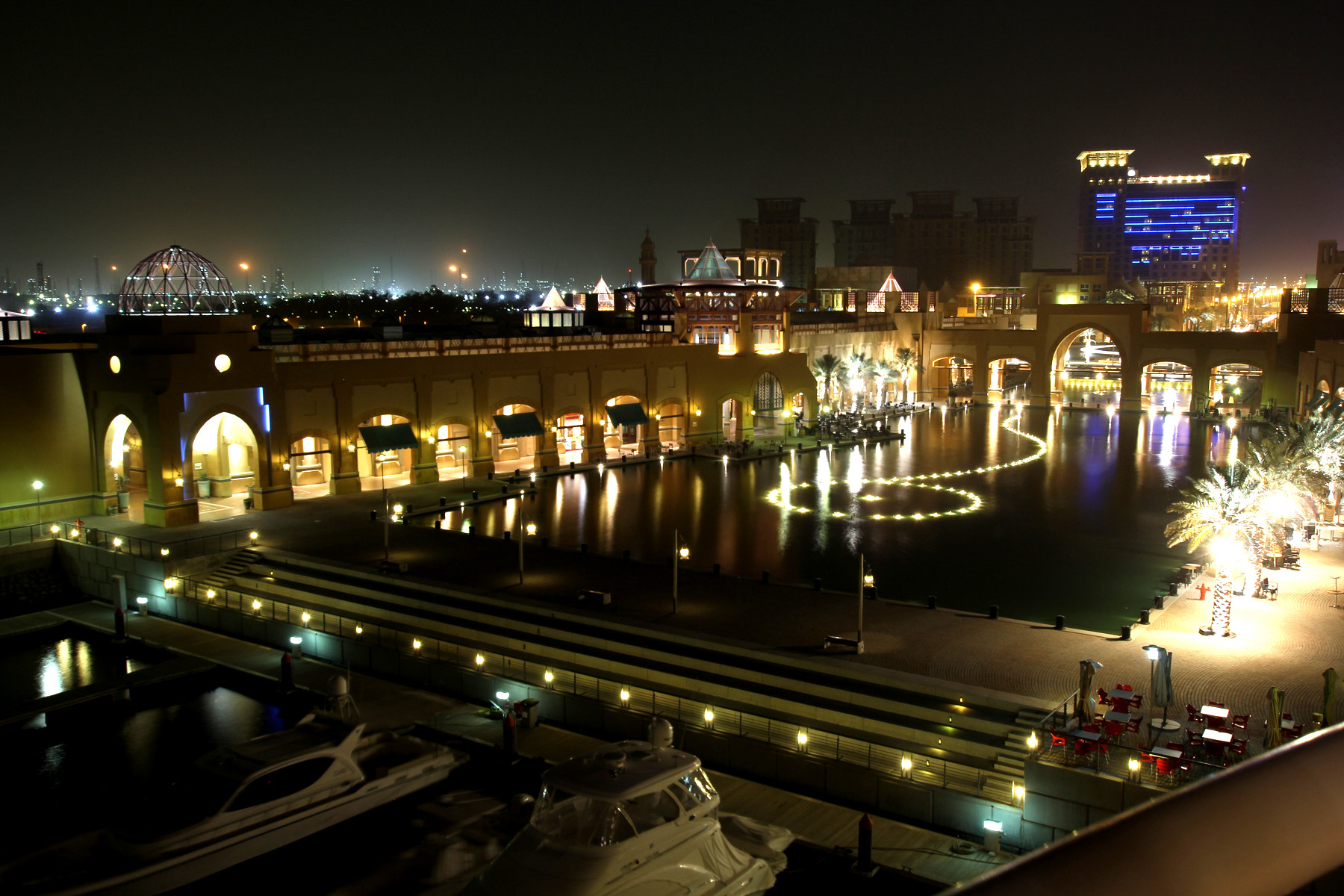
- Al Kout Mall night view
- Location: Fahaheel, Al Ahmadi Governorate, Kuwait
- Address: Al Daboos St, Block 12, Fahaheel Al Ahmadi, Dabous St, 63000
- Opened: 10 February 2005; 21 years ago
- Owner: Tamdeen Group
- Website: Al Kout Mall

Al Kout Mall is a shopping mall in Fahaheel (Ahmadi governorate), in southern Kuwait that opened on 10 February 2005. It contains fountains which offer a night show. One of the biggest malls in Kuwait, it hosts many regional and international brands and a traditional market.

== History ==
In 2018, AZADEA Group announced 11 new store openings Al Kout Mall (ZARA, Zara Home, Bershka, Massimo Dutti, Pull & Bear, Stradivarius, Uterqüe, Oysho, Calzedonia, Sunglass Hut, IAM and KIKO Milano).

Hyatt Regency Al Kout Mall was opened in 2019.

In 2021, Al Kout Mall announced the opening of Q8 Karting, the largest indoor multi-storey go-karting track in the Middle East.
