= CityOn Zhengzhou Shopping Center =

CityOn Zhengzhou
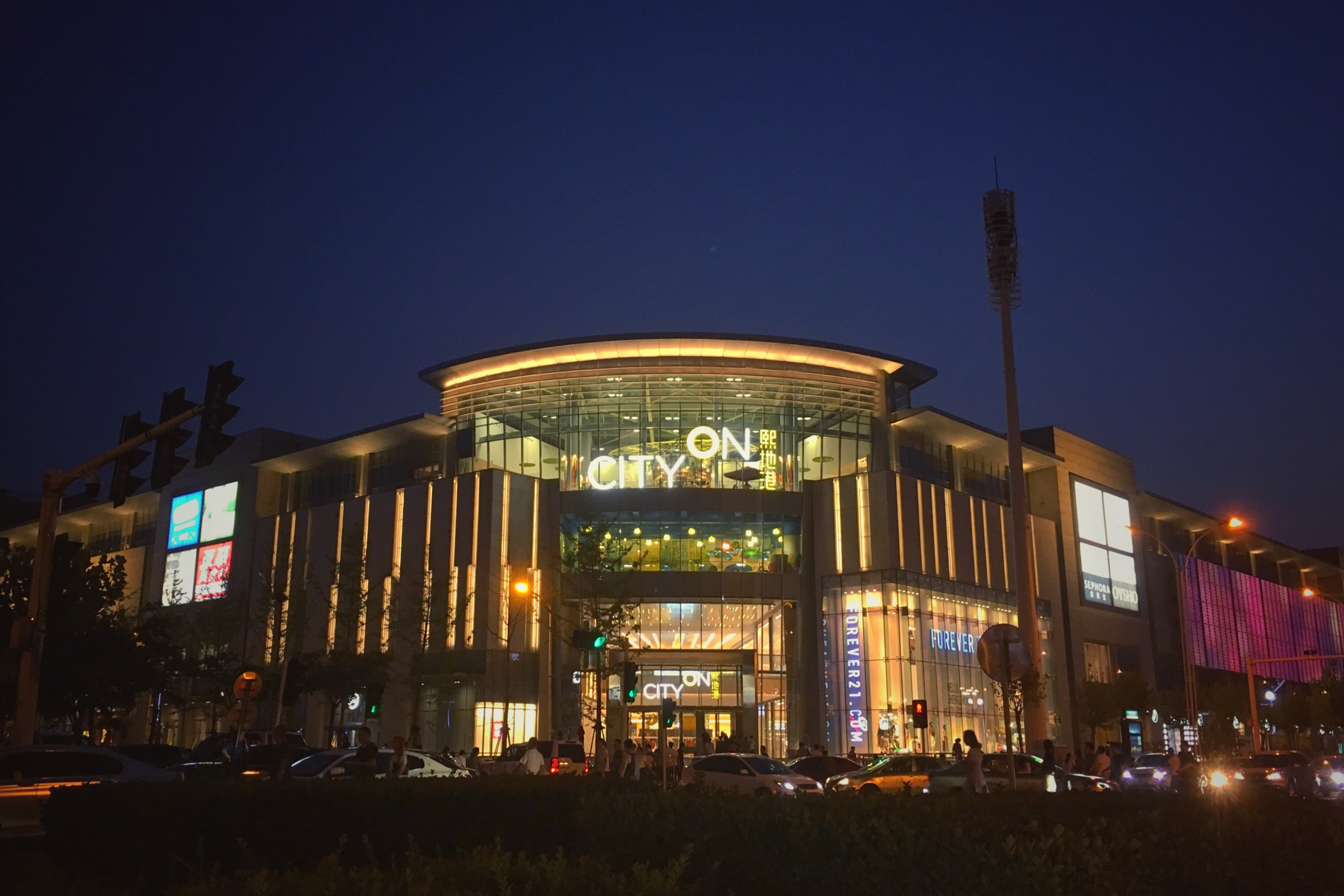
- Location: Zhengdong New Area, Zhengzhou, China
- Address: 15 Nongye E. Road,
- Opened: March 16, 2017; 8 years ago
- Developer: Wangfujing Group and Taubman Centers
- Manager: Simon Property Group
- Owner: Simon Property Group
- Floor area: Approximately 94,000 square metres (1,010,000 sq ft)
- Floors: 6
- Parking: 1700 parking spaces
- Website: zhengzhou.cityoncenter.com

CityOn Zhengzhou Shopping Center (Chinese: 熙地港（郑州）购物中心) is a shopping mall on Nongye E. Road in Zhengdong New Area, Zhengzhou, China. It was opened on 16 March 2017.

== Features ==
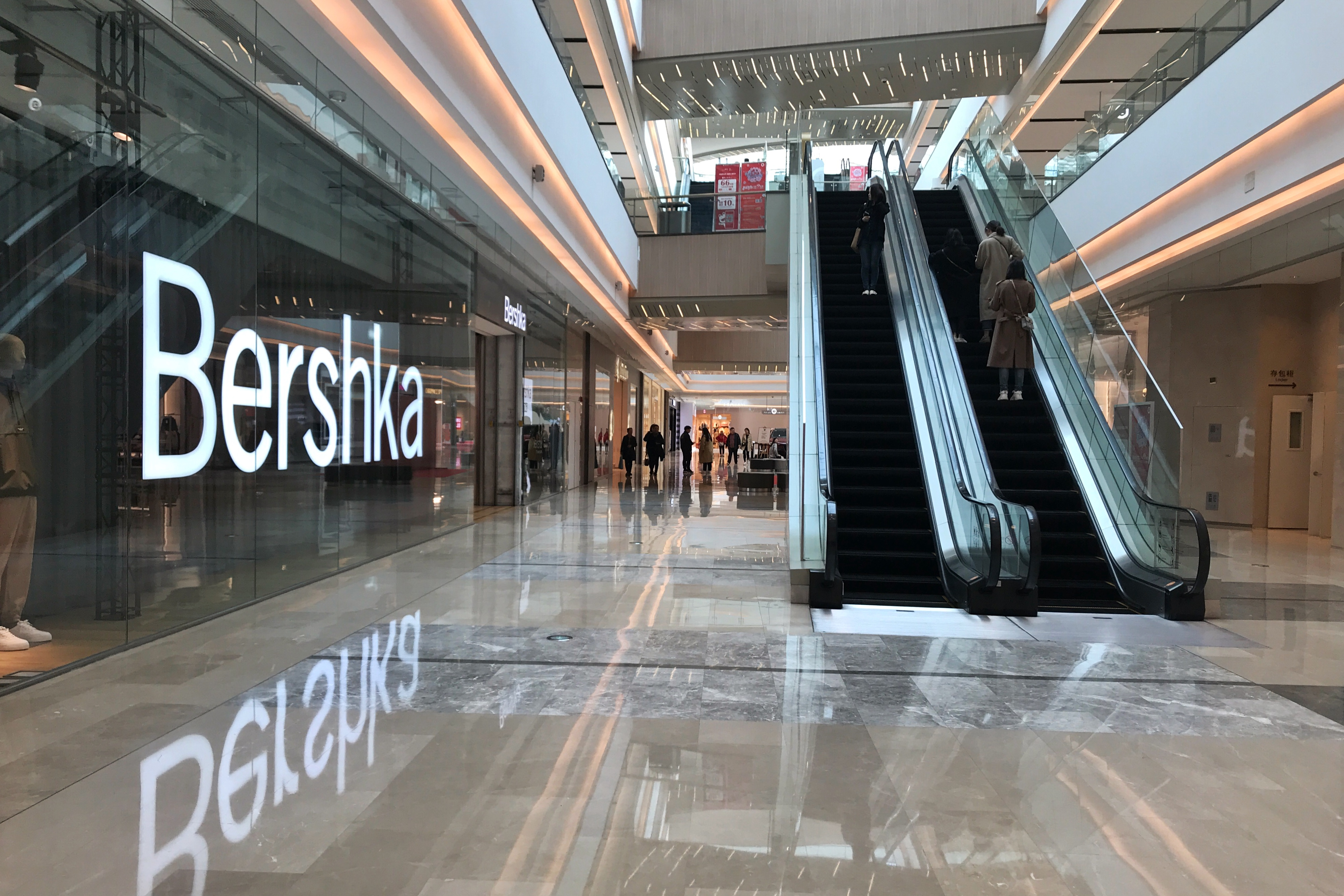
L1 of the mall

The mall mainly features some fast fashion brands, including H&M, Zara, Massimo Dutti, Bershka, Oysho, Stradivarius, Zara Home, Uniqlo, etc. Restaurants are located on B1 level and the L3 and L4 levels.
