= José María Castellano =

Spanish businessman (1947–2025)

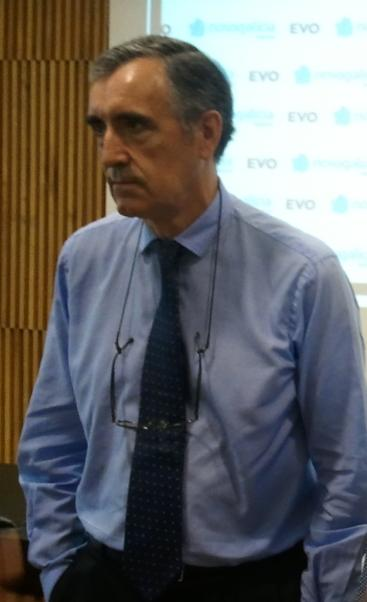
Castellano in 2012

José María Castellano Ríos (15 July 1947 – 17 September 2025) was a Spanish businessman.

== Life and career ==
Castellano was born in A Coruña, Galicia, Spain on 15 July 1947. He was CEO and Deputy Chairman of the Inditex Group, which is one of the largest fashion groups in the world and includes brand stores such as Zara, Massimo Dutti, and Bershka. He also took part in the strategy of N.M. Rothschild as a senior advisor. Castellano died on 17 September 2025, at the age of 78.
