= Bershka =

Spanish clothing retailer

- Type: Subsidiary
- Industry: Retail
- Founded: April 1998; 28 years ago
- Founder: Amancio Ortega
- Headquarters: Barcelona, Spain
- Number of locations: 971 (2021)
- Area served: Worldwide
- Products: Clothing
- Revenue: ▲€2,177 billion (2021)
- Parent: Inditex
- Divisions: Bershka Diseño; Berksha Logística
- Website: www.bershka.com

Bershka (Spanish: [ˈbeɾʃka, ˈbeɾska]) is a Spanish clothing retailer founded in 1998 in Spain. It is part of the Spanish Inditex group (which also owns brands such as Zara, Massimo Dutti, Pull&Bear, Oysho, Uterqüe, Stradivarius and Zara Home).

The company was created in April 1998 as a new store and 'fast-fashion' concept, aimed at a young target market. As of January 2022, Bershka has over 852 stores in 74 countries. The sales made from Bershka represent 10% of the Inditex.

In August 2022, Bershka, along with Pull&Bear and Stradivarius, closed their TMall stores and physical retail locations in China.

== Gallery ==
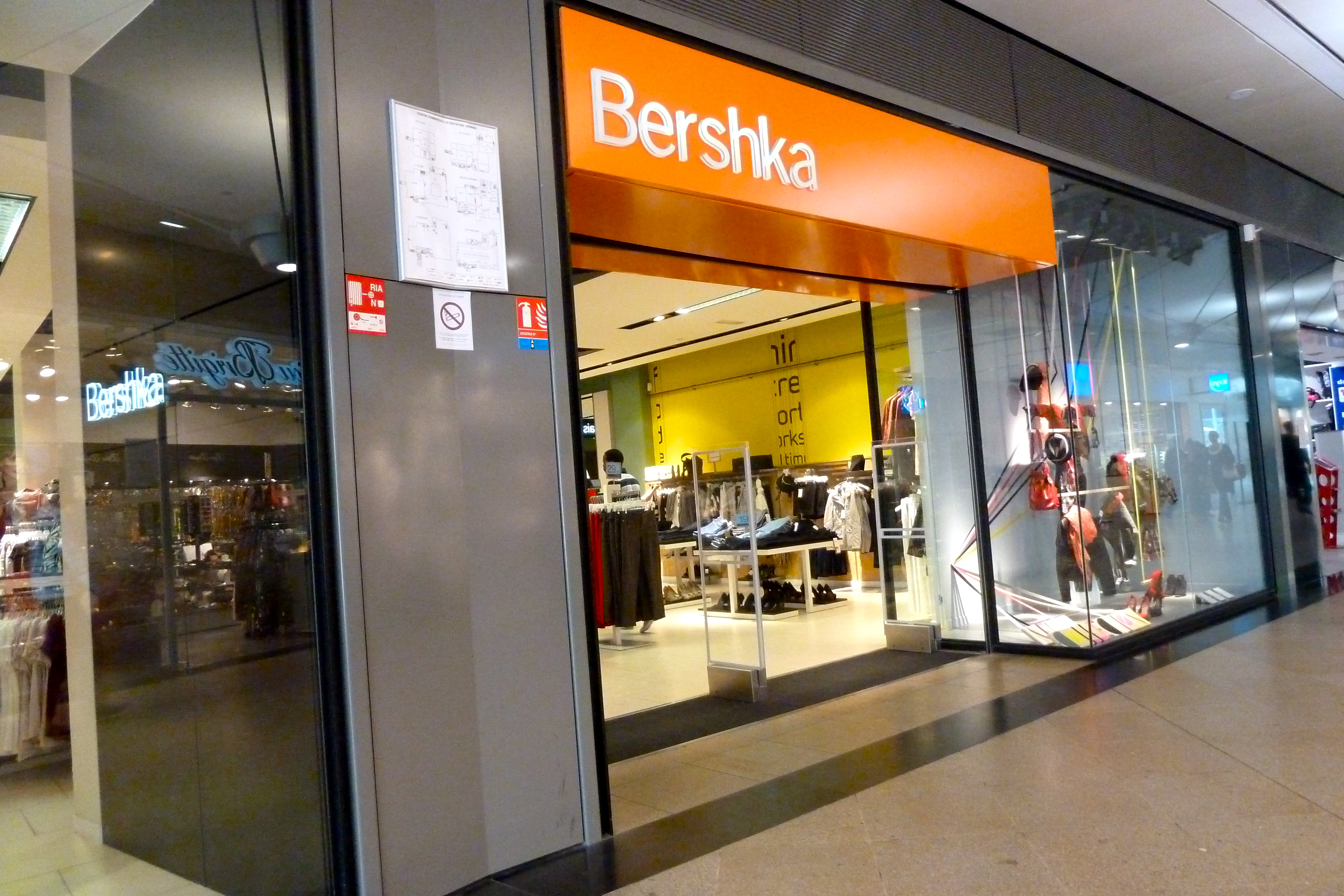
Bershka store in Rennes, France

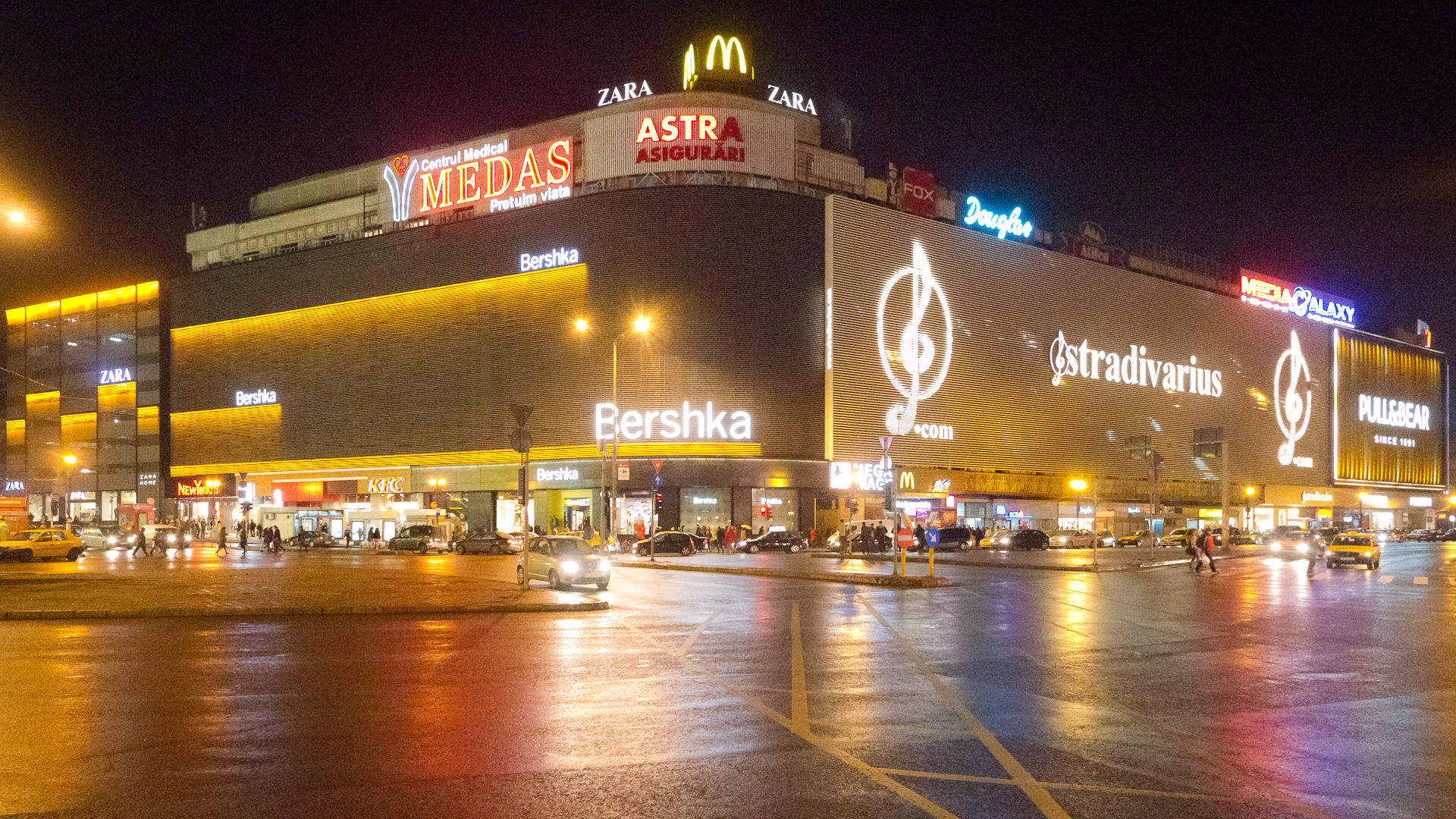
Bershka featured at Unirea Shopping Center in Bucharest, Romania

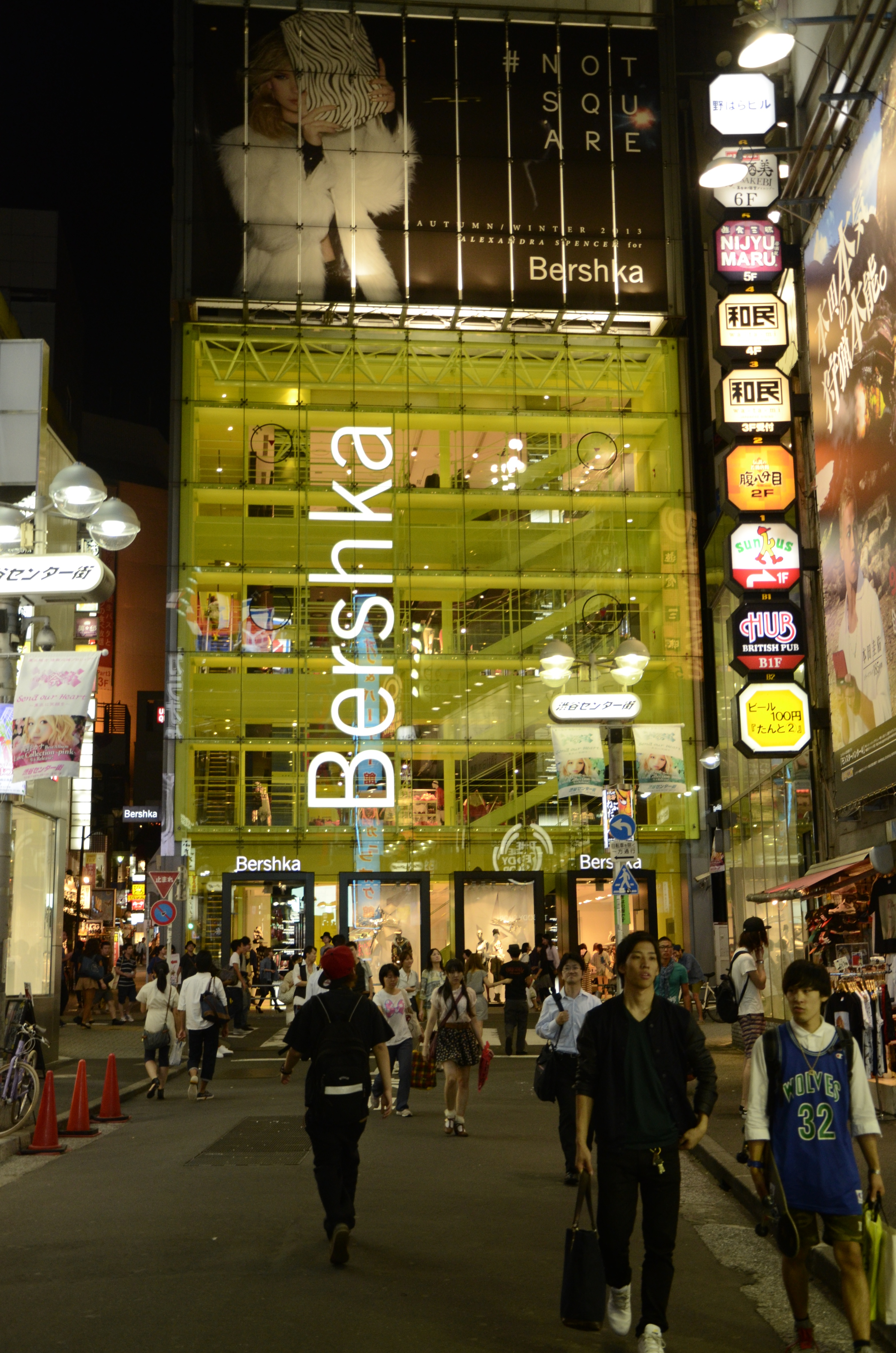
Bershka store in Shibuya, Japan

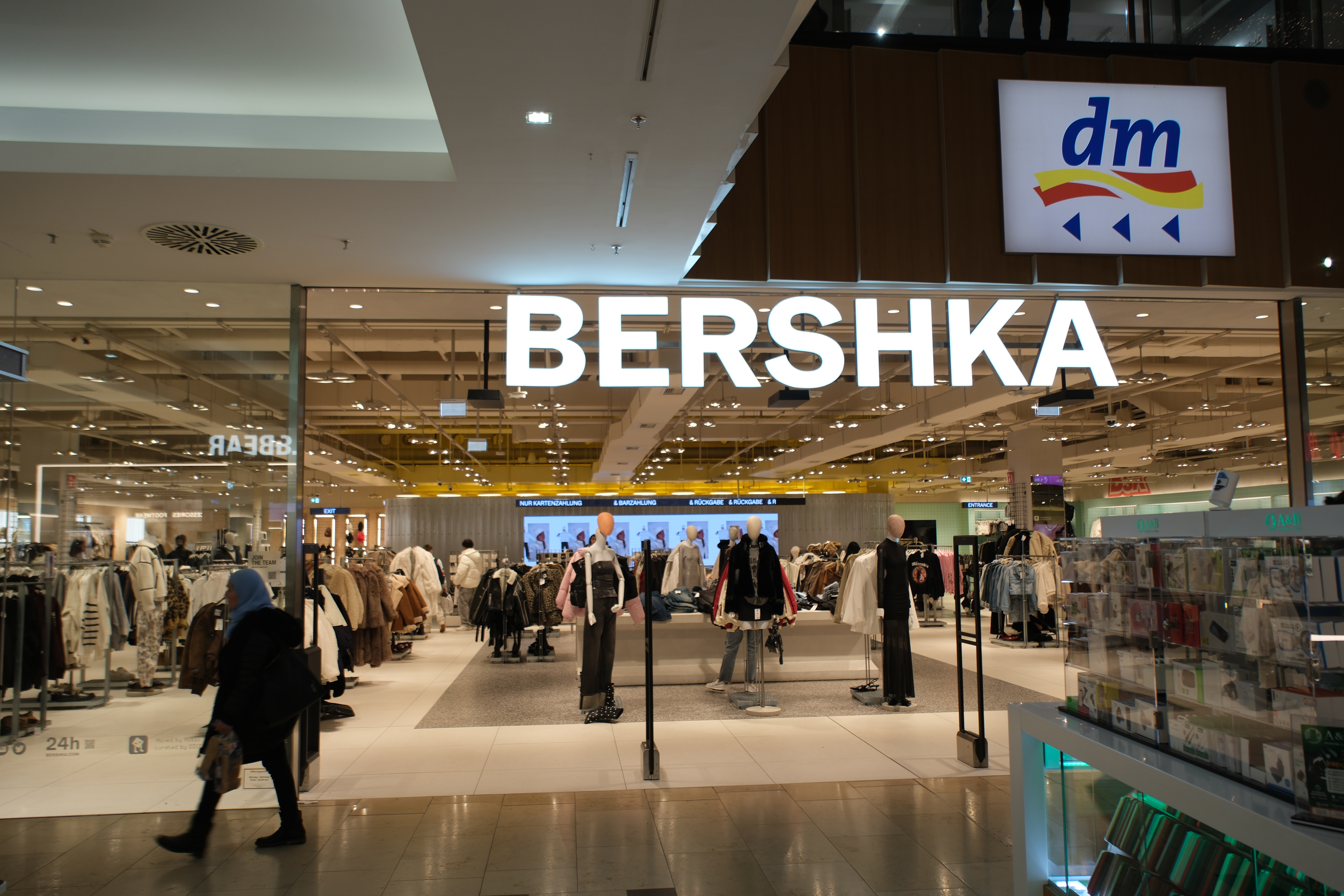
Bershka store at Regensburg Arcaden in Regensburg, Germany

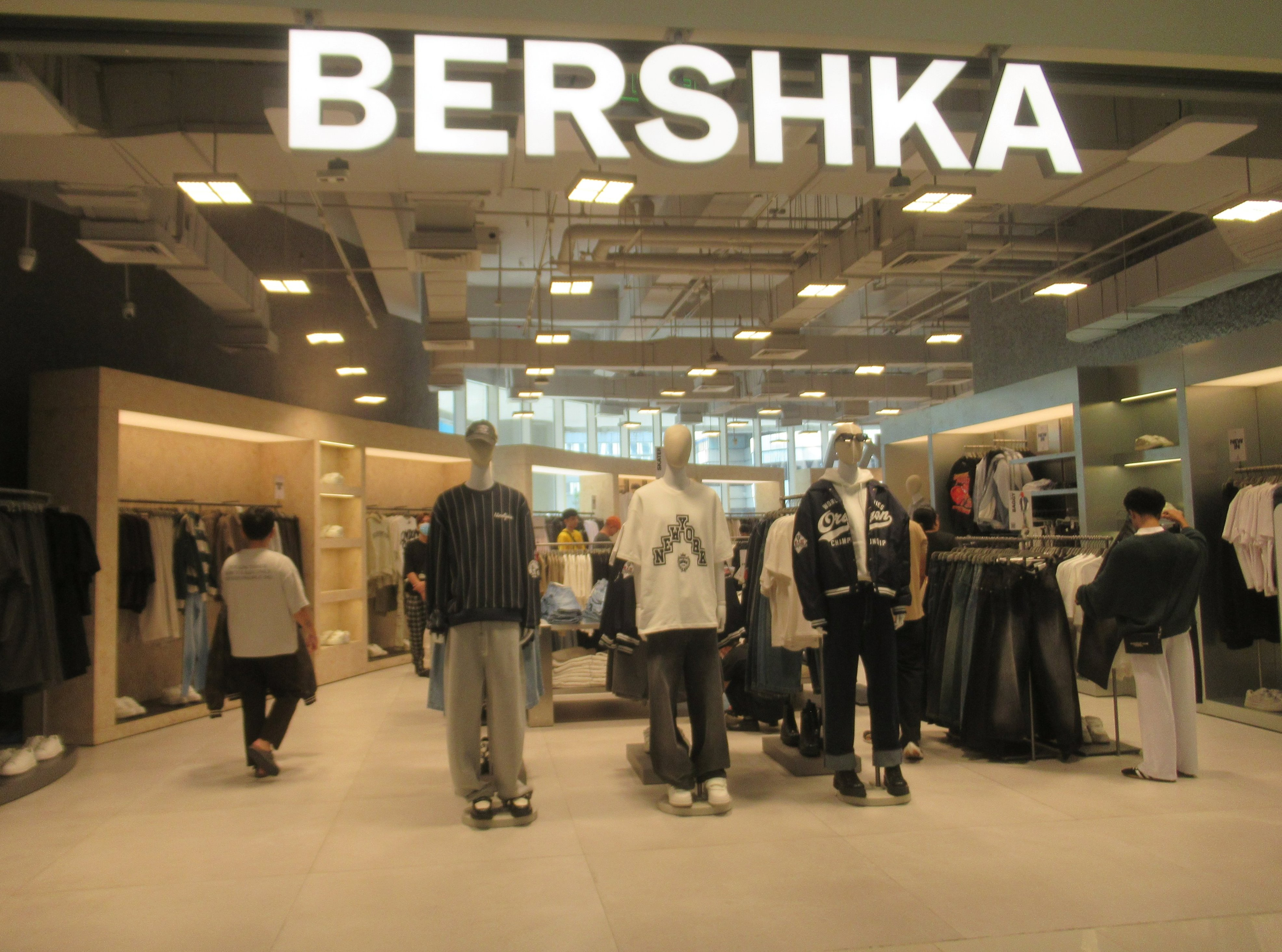
Bershka store at SM North EDSA in Quezon City, Philippines

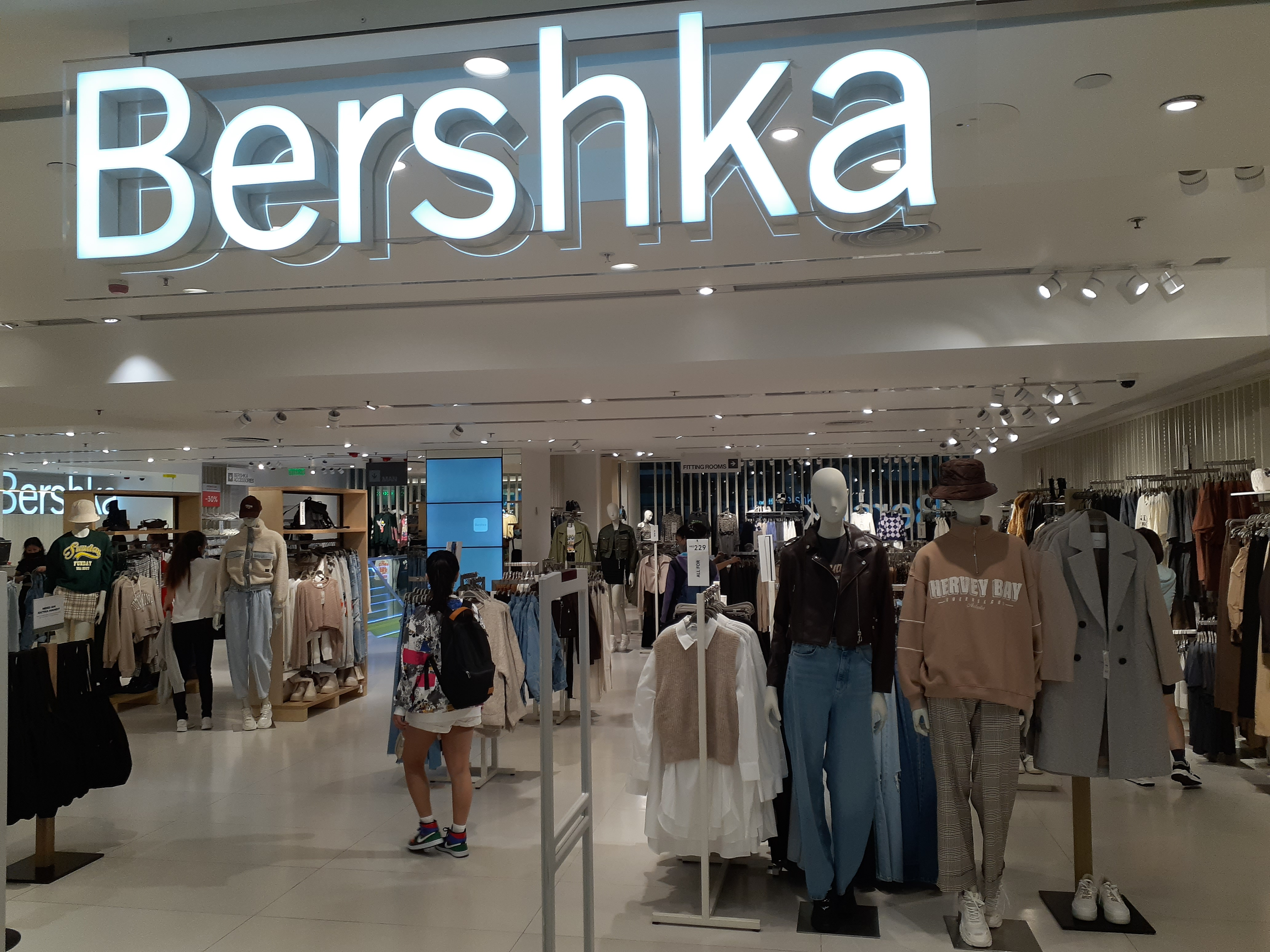
Bershka store at Tsuen Wan Plaza in Hong Kong

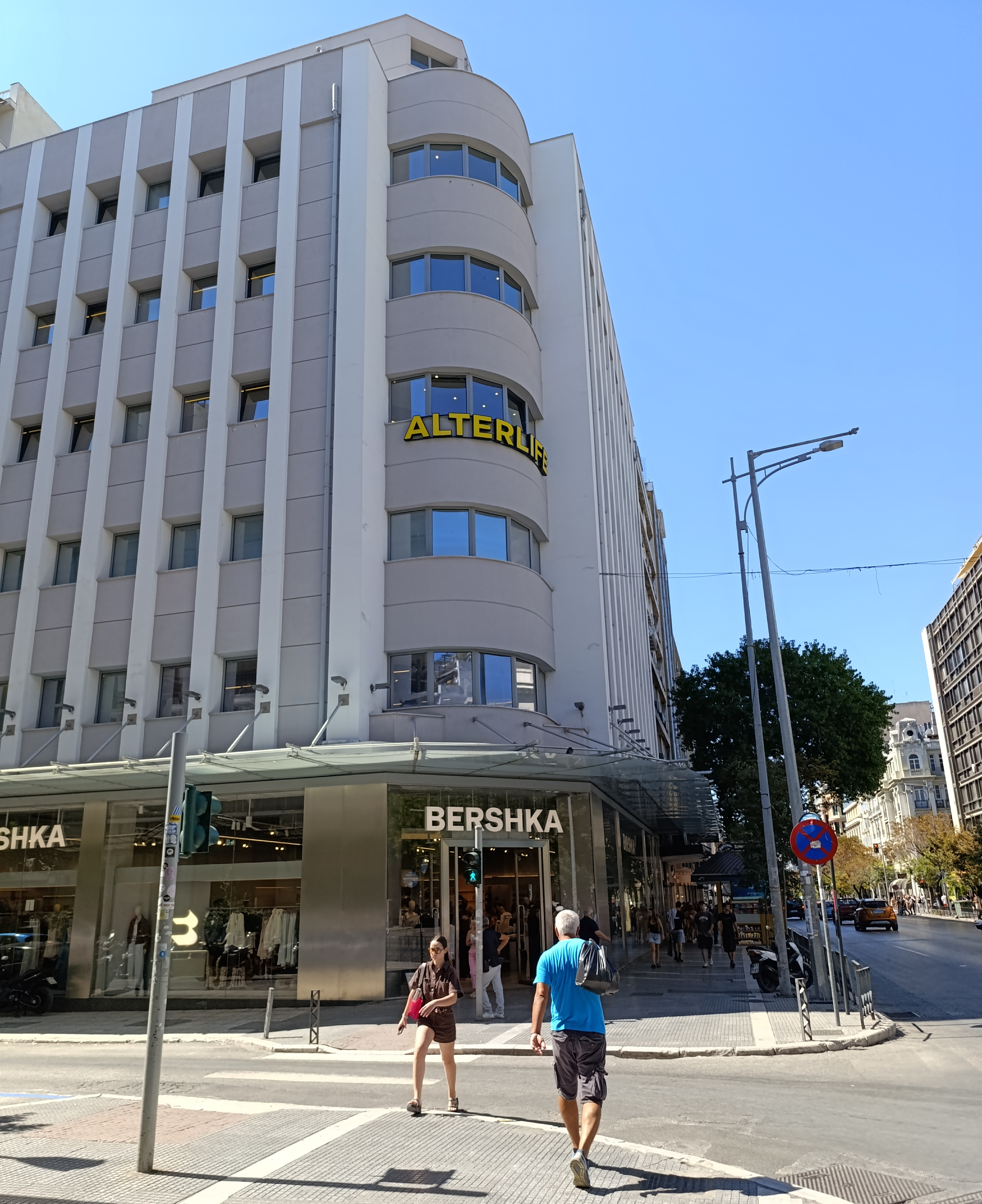
Bershka store in Thessaloniki, Greece at the intersection of Tsimiski Street and Komninon Street

== Stores ==
Bershka has stores in Africa, North, Central and South America, Asia, and Europe, including:

Africa

- Egypt: 6
- Morocco: 3
- Tunisia: 5
- Algeria: 3

Americas

- Mexico: 75
- Colombia: 13
- Venezuela: 9
- Dominican Republic: 6
- Guatemala: 3
- Costa Rica: 2
- Ecuador: 2
- El Salvador: 2
- Honduras: 2
- Panama: 2
- Brazil: 2
- Nicaragua: 1
- Paraguay: 1
- United States: 1

Asia

- Saudi Arabia: 32
- Japan: 25
- Israel: 17
- United Arab Emirates: 9
- Indonesia: 9
- Lebanon: 9
- Kazakhstan: 6
- Philippines: 6
- South Korea: 5
- Hong Kong: 5
- Qatar: 4
- Taiwan: 3
- Kuwait: 5
- Singapore: 1
- Jordan: 2
- Malaysia: 2
- Bahrain: 1
- Macau: 1
- Oman: 1
- India: 1
- Thailand: 1

Europe

- Spain: 201
- Russia: 99
- Italy: 67
- France: 52
- Poland: 50
- Portugal: 48
- Turkey: 35
- Greece: 30
- Romania: 25
- Netherlands: 18
- Germany: 14
- Ukraine: 14
- Belgium: 13
- United Kingdom: 11
- Croatia: 9
- Hungary: 9
- Bulgaria: 8
- Austria: 8
- Serbia: 7
- Cyprus: 7
- Ireland: 6
- Switzerland: 6
- Czech Republic: 5
- Slovakia: 5
- Lithuania: 4
- Slovenia: 4
- Armenia: 3
- Azerbaijan: 3
- Bosnia and Herzegovina: 4
- Georgia: 3
- Latvia: 3
- Albania: 2
- Kosovo: 2
- Belarus: 2
- Luxembourg: 2
- Malta: 2
- North Macedonia: 2
- Andorra: 1
- Sweden: 2
- Estonia: 1
- Montenegro: 1

== See also ==
- Shein
- Zara
