= Javier Torá =

Spanish business executive

- Born: 1971 (age 53–54); Petrel, Alicante, Spain
- Citizenship: Spanish
- Education: Harvard Business School
- Occupation: Businessman
- Known for: Founder and CEO of the business group Elegant Supreme

Javier Torá (Born 1971) is a Spanish entrepreneur who is the founder and CEO of the business group Elegant Supreme, specialized in leather goods and fashion. He is a resident of Guangzhou, China, where he developed much of his professional career.

== Early life and education ==
Torá was born in Spain in 1971 and obtained a Master’s degree in Management from Harvard Business School.

== Career ==
Torá began his career in his father's leather goods company in Petrel. After the closure of that business, he founded a factory in Cádiz dedicated to leather production, which also ceased operations, forcing him to return to Alicante to work for a competitor of the family business. It was this company that invited him to move to China to expand their business.

In 2013, he established Elegant Supreme in Guangzhou, taking advantage of the country’s competitive edge in textile production. The company collaborated with international brands such as Inditex, Mango, El Corte Inglés, C&A, Armani Exchange, and Desigual.

== Other positions ==
Torá is the president of the Spanish Chamber of Commerce in Southern China and founder and coordinator of the Spanish Business Club in Canton.

== Recognition ==
In 2021, he was awarded the Officer's Cross of the Order of Isabella the Catholic by the Spanish Ministry of Foreign Affairs, in recognition of his work on behalf of the Spanish community in southern China.
