= JOOBLE =

Job search engine

- Industry: Jobs and Employment
- Founded: 2006
- Founders: Roman Prokofiev and Eugene Sobakarev
- Headquarters: Kyiv, Ukraine
- Key people: CEO Dmytro Gryn
- Website: https://jooble.org/

Jooble, stylized as JOOBLE is an international job aggregator and job posting search engine founded in 2006.

== History ==
The idea of JOOBLE appeared in 2006. Six months after its launch, the startup began to receive operating profit. The first major investor, Horizon Capital, invested in Jooble in 2014.

In 2014, Google changed its search engine ranking rules, which led to a crisis for the companies in various industries, and from which Jooble itself only emerged in 2017. Three years later, in 2020, Jooble acquired the job aggregator Hotwork, at the time popular in post-Soviet countries.

In 2022, Jooble invested $1 million in JayJay startup, Indonesia's online education platform. It launched the JOOBLE Job Search mobile app on iOS and Android in 2022. After the Russian invasion of Ukraine in 2022, the site ceased its operations in Russia and Belarus. In the same year, JOOBLE, together with European companies, launched the Give a Job for UA project, helping Ukrainian refugees with employment.

== Overview ==
JOOBLE is a global partner of LinkedIn and Google. Jooble aggregates vacancies with more than 140,000 resources from around the world daily. Sources include corporate websites, social networks, classifieds, and other resources. JOOBLE makes its revenue from selling the redirects to other job search websites, leaving its service free for job seekers. The company has 330+ employees, with Dmytro Gryn being the CEO.
