= Uterqüe =

Clothing and accessories brand of Massimo Dutti

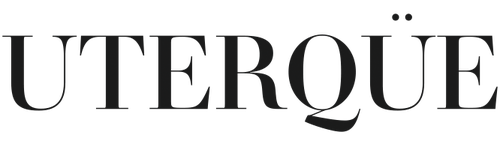
- Type: Brand
- Industry: Fashion
- Founded: 2008; 18 years ago
- Headquarters: Tordera, Barcelona, Spain
- Products: Fashion accessories
- Revenue: ▲€97 million (2017)
- Parent: Inditex
- Website: www.uterque.com

Uterqüe is a fashion brand of the Spanish Inditex group dedicated to accessories and garments such as scarves and sunglasses. It was founded in 2008 as a company with headquarters in Tordera, Barcelona in Spain. In September 2021, Inditex announced the closing of all physical stores, but remaining as a brand within Massimo Dutti retail chain.

The company had 90 stores in 16 countries:

Africa

- Morocco: 1

Americas

- Mexico: 15

Asia

- Saudi Arabia: 5
- Qatar: 3
- Kuwait: 2
- United Arab Emirates: 2
- Jordan: 1
- Kazakhstan: 1
- Lebanon: 1

Europe

- Spain: 33
- Russia: 13
- Portugal: 6
- Poland: 4
- Andorra: 1
- Romania: 1
- Ukraine: 1
