= Inditex =

Spanish multinational clothing company

Industria de Diseño Textil, S.A.

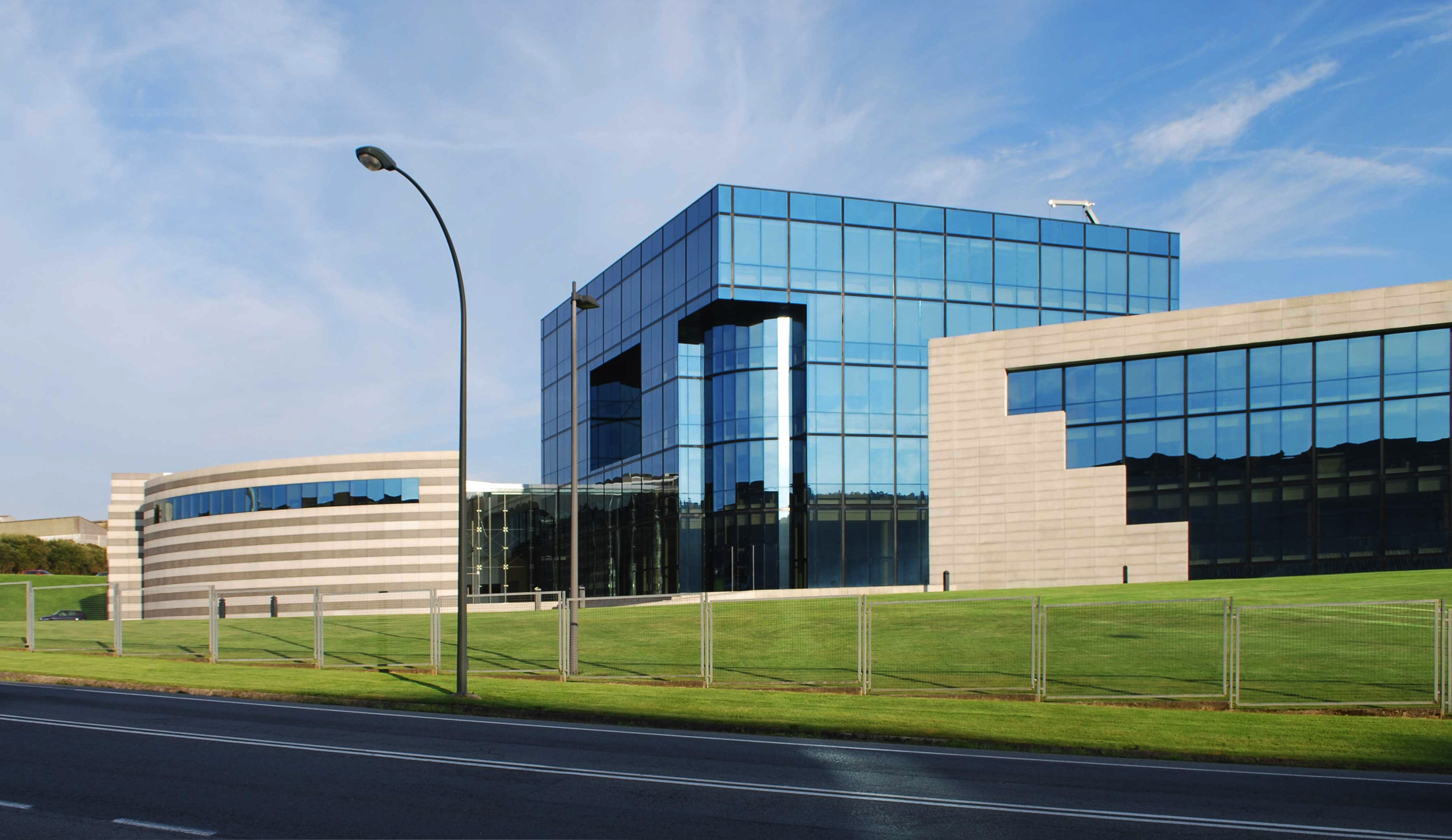
- Headquarters in Arteixo, Spain
- Trade name: Inditex
- Type: Public company
- Traded as: BMAD: ITX; IBEX 35 component; EURO STOXX 50 component
- ISIN: ES0148396007
- Industry: Retail
- Predecessor: Confecciones GOA, S.A.; GOASAM, S.A.
- Founded: A Coruña, Galicia, Spain (12 June 1985; 41 years ago)
- Founders: Amancio Ortega; Rosalía Mera
- Headquarters: Arteixo, Galicia, Spain
- Number of locations: 5,563 stores
- Area served: Worldwide
- Key people: Óscar García Maceiras (CEO); Marta Ortega (chairwoman)
- Products: Clothing & fashion
- Revenue: ▲€38.63 billion (2024)
- Operating income: ▲€7.57 billion (2024)
- Net income: ▲€5.86 billion (2024)
- Total assets: ▲€34.71 billion (2024)
- Total equity: ▲€19.67 billion (2024)
- Owner: Amancio Ortega (59%)
- Number of employees: ▲162,083 (2024)
- Subsidiaries: Zara; Massimo Dutti; Pull&Bear; Stradivarius; Bershka; Oysho; Zara Home; Uterqüe; Lefties
- Website: www.inditex.com

Industria de Diseño Textil, S.A. (Inditex; /ˌɪndɪˈtɛks/, Spanish: [indiˈteks]; lit. 'Textile Design Industry') is a Spanish multinational clothing company headquartered in Arteixo, Galicia, Spain. The largest fast fashion group in the world, it operates over 7,200 stores in 93 markets worldwide. The company's predominant brand is Zara, but it also owns a number of other brands including Zara Home, Massimo Dutti, Pull&Bear, Stradivarius, Bershka, Oysho and Uterqüe. The majority of its stores are corporate-owned, while franchises are mainly conceded in countries where corporate properties cannot be foreign-owned.

Inditex's business model emphasises fast response to market trends. The company has implemented a system that allows for frequent product updates in stores, with the process from design to retail shelf reportedly taking as little as 15 days in some cases. This approach contrasts with the longer production cycles typical of many traditional fashion companies.

The Uyghur Rights Monitor, Sheffield Hallam University, and the Uyghur Center for Democracy and Human Rights have accused the company of using Uyghur forced labour through the Chinese based textile supplier Beijing Guanghua Textile Group.

== History ==
=== 1960s and 1970s ===
In the early 1960s Amancio Ortega started his own business in the clothing industry while working for a local shirtmaker in A Coruña, Spain. Ortega began developing his designs and he and his wife Rosalia Mera started making clothes in their home. Amancio had saved up enough money to open a small factory and sold garments to his former employer, among others.

In 1975, the couple opened their first store, Zara, which produced popular fashion at low prices. The following year, Zara was incorporated and began opening more stores and factories in Spain. Later that year, after noticing the growing importance of computers, Ortega hired a local professor, José María Castellano, to develop the company's computing power.

=== 1980–2000 ===
In the 1980s, the company implemented a new design and distribution method that drastically reduced the time between design, production, and arrival at retail sites. The system was designed by Castellano, who became the company's CEO in 1984. In 1985, Industria de Diseño Textil S.A. or Inditex was created as a holding company for Zara and its manufacturing plants.

In 1988, the company began expanding internationally with the opening of a Zara store in Porto, Portugal. In 1990, the company-owned footwear collection, Tempe, populated in the children's section of Zara stores. In 1991, Inditex created the company Pull and Bear, a casual menswear company. Later that year, the company also acquired a 65 percent share in the upscale Massimo Dutti brand. Inditex created Lefties in 1993; the name is taken from the term leftovers, and it was created to sell old Zara clothing. In 1995, Inditex purchased the remaining Massimo Dutti shares and began expanding the brand to include a women's line. In 1998, Inditex launched the Bershka brand that was aimed at urban hip fashion. The company bought Stradivarius in 1999, a youthful female fashion brand.

=== 2001–present ===
Inditex had its initial public offering (IPO) in 2001, on the Bolsa de Madrid. The IPO sold 26 percent of the company to public investors, the company was valued at €9 billion. The same year, the company launched the lingerie and women's clothing store Oysho. In 2003, Inditex launched the Zara Home brand, which offers bedding, cutlery, glassware and other home decoration accessories. In 2004, with the opening of store number 2,000 in Hong Kong, Inditex had established its presence in 56 countries.

In 2005, CEO Jose Maria Castellano stepped down from the position to oversee expansion plans, he was replaced by Pablo Isla. Inditex launched Uterque in the summer of 2008, the brand specializes in women's accessories. During the same year, the company opened its 4,000th store in Tokyo after doubling in size within four years. In 2011, Ortega, the founder of the business and majority shareholder, stepped down as deputy chairman and CEO Isla handles day-to-day operations. Later that year, the company opened a store in Australia, a move that would put the company on five continents and in 77 countries. After the 2013 Savar building collapse, Inditex was one of the thirty-eight companies who signed the Accord on Factory and Building Safety in Bangladesh.

As of 2019, Inditex is the biggest fashion retailer in the world by revenue. The company's revenue fell by 18% to $1.85 billion in the final quarter of 2020, primarily due to the fall in retail sales as a result of the coronavirus pandemic. Inditex's stocks fell by 12% over the year. In May 2021, Inditex said that all its stores in Venezuela would close as it will review its agreement with its local partner, Phoenix World Trade. In the three months to 30 April 2023, the group reported a 13% increase in sales to £6.54 billion and a 14% rise in profit to £3.96 billion. Inditex announced plans to open 200 new Lefties stores across Europe, including the UK and France, in 2026. This expansion is part of the company’s efforts to grow its budget fashion segment.

== International presence ==
In 1989, a year after entering Portugal, the company entered the U.S. market and expanded into France in 1990. Expansion continued to Mexico in 1992 and Greece in 1993. In 1994, Inditex opened stores in Belgium and Sweden. By 1997, the company had expanded to Malta, Cyprus, Norway and Israel. In 1998, expansion continued to the UK, Turkey, Argentina, Venezuela, the Middle East and Japan. Canada, Germany, Poland, Saudi Arabia and several South American countries received stores in 1999.

The company opened stores in Italy, Luxembourg and Jordan in 2001. In 2003, Inditex opened stores in Russia, Slovakia and Malaysia. The following year Latvia, Hungary, and Panama among other countries where stores opened, including the 2,000th store in Hong Kong. By 2006, the company had expanded into mainland China. In 2010, the company opened its 5,000th location in Rome and its first in India. The first stores in Australia and South Africa opened in 2011. The company's expansion continued to the Serbia, North Macedonia, Armenia, Ecuador, Georgia and Bosnia-Herzegovina in 2012. In 2014, Inditex opened stores in Albania. In 2016, Inditex announced that it planned to open stores in Vietnam, New Zealand, Paraguay, Aruba and Nicaragua.

== Online sales ==
In 2007, Inditex launched the Zara Home online retail store. Zara joined the e-commerce marketplace in September 2010, launching websites in Spain, the UK, Portugal, Italy, Germany and France. In November 2010, Zara's online presence grew to include Austria, Ireland, the Netherlands, Belgium and Luxembourg.

In September 2011, Inditex brought Zara's e-commerce platform to the U.S., as well as adding the brands Pull and Bear, Massimo Dutti, Bershka, Stradivarius, Oysho and Uterqüe to the e-commerce space. As of February 2016, Inditex operates e-commerce sites in 28 markets and plans to add 12 more by April. In September 2018, Inditex announced to sell all its brands online by 2020, even in places where it does not own any stores.

== Marketing strategy ==
Inditex avoids magazine advertising, with print campaigns only occurring on billboards in certain regions like U.S. and in-store. Endorsements for celebrities to wear its labels are budgeted instead. The company invests in commercial locations and uses window displays to increase visibility and product turnover.

== Plagiarism ==
Zara has been accused of copying artwork.

In 2017, Zara Home Belgium was convicted of plagiarism by a Brussels Court, which was claimed to have been the first plagiarism conviction of a fast retailer.

== Brands ==
Under the Inditex umbrella are several brands that offer a variety of products aimed at different markets.

=== Original ===
| Company | No. of stores | Year of creation | Market | Notes |
|---|---|---|---|---|
| Zara | 1,759 | 1975 | Clothing for men, women and children | |
| Pull&Bear | 800 | 1991 | Clothing and accessories for young women and men | |
| Lefties | 177 | 1993 | Affordable fashion and home goods | |
| Bershka | 854 | 1998 | Clothing and accessories for young women and men | |
| Oysho | 396 | 2001 | Lingerie, casual outerwear, loungewear, gym wear & swimwear and original accessories for women | |
| Zara Home | 391 | 2003 | Home goods and decoration objects | |

=== Acquired ===
| Company | No. of stores | Acquired | Market | Notes |
|---|---|---|---|---|
| Massimo Dutti | 528 | 1991 (fully acquired in 1995) | Clothing and accessories for young women and men | |
| Stradivarius | 835 | 1999 (fully acquired in 2005) | Clothing and accessories for young women | |

=== Former ===
| Company | No. of stores | Year of creation | Market | Notes |
|---|---|---|---|---|
| Uterqüe | 82 (closed) | 2008 | Women's fashion accessories | Inditex integrated Uterqüe into Massimo Dutti in September 2021. |

== Corporate affairs ==
=== Board of directors ===
Bold indicates a company shareholder, and the representative will be listed below.

| Member | Title(s) | Member Since | Shares Held | Notes |
|---|---|---|---|---|
| Marta Ortega | Chairwoman of Inditex | April 2022 | 42,511 | |
| Óscar García Maceiras | CEO of Inditex | November 2021 | 8,570 | |
| Jose Arnau Sierra | Deputy Chairman of Inditex; First Executive of Grupo Pontegadea; Director of GARTLER, S.L. Member of the Board of Trustees of Fundacion Amancio Ortega Gaona | June 2012 | 30,000 | |
| Amancio Ortega | Founder & Board Member of Inditex | June 1985 | 1,848,000,315 | |
| **Pontegadea Inversiones, S.L.** Ms. Flora Perez Marcote | Board Member of Inditex | December 2015 | | |
| Baroness Kingsmill CBE | Board Member of Inditex; Member of the supervisory board of EON; Non-executive director of International Airlines Group SA; Chairman of Mondo; Member of the International Advisory Board of the Spanish Business School (IESE) | July 2016 | | |
| Jose Luis Duran Schulz | Board Member of Inditex; Independent Director & Member of the Audit Committee of Orange | July 2015 | 3,106 | |
| Rodrigo Echenique Gordillo | Board Member of Inditex; Chairman of NH Hoteles | July 2014 | 20,000 | |
| Emilio Saracho Rodriguez de Torres | Board Member of Inditex; Head of Investment Banking of JPMorgan Europe, Middle East, & Africa, Ltd. Executive Committee Member of Investment Bank; Executive Committee Member of JPMorgan Chase; Deputy-CEO of EMEA | June 2010 | | |
| Pilar López Álvarez | Board Member of Inditex Deputy Chair of Microsoft Western Europe | July 2018 | 4,000 | |
| Anne Lange | Board Member of Inditex Member of the boards of Orange, Pernod-Ricard, and FFP. | July 2020 | | |
| Marta Andreia Rodrigues | Director of Zara Woman | September 2026 | | |

=== Ownership ===
The largest shareholders in early 2024 were:

| Shareholder | Ownership stake (%) | Value in € bn. |
|---|---|---|
| Pontegadea Inversiones, S.L (Amancio Ortega) | 50.1% | €68.9 |
| Partler 2006 SL | 9.3% | €12.8 |
| Sandra Ortega Mera | 5.06% | €7.0 |
| Capital Research and Management Company | 1.71% | €2.4 |
| BlackRock, Inc. | 1.41% | €1.9 |
| The Vanguard Group, Inc. | 1.33% | €1.8 |
| Norges Bank Investment Management | 1.01% | €1.4 |
| Amundi Asset Management SAS | 0.74% | €1.0 |
| Fidelity International Ltd | 0.45% | €0.625 |
| Walter Scott & Partners Limited | 0.32% | €0.442 |

=== Financial data ===
| Financial data | 2018 | 2019 | 2020 | 2021 | 2022 | 2023 | 2024 |
|---|---|---|---|---|---|---|---|
| Sales (in mn. €) | 26,145 | 28,286 | 20,402 | 27,716 | 32,569 | 35,947 | 38,632 |
| Net profit (in mn. €) | 3,444 | 3,639 | 1,106 | 3,243 | 4,130 | 5,381 | 5,866 |
| Total equity (in mn. €) | 21,684 | 28,391 | 26,418 | 28,945 | 29,983 | 32,735 | 34,714 |
| Employees | 174,386 | 176,611 | 144,116 | 165,042 | 164,997 | 161,281 | 162,083 |

==== Sales by region ====
| Region | 2024 Sales in billion € | in % |
|---|---|---|
| Europe (excluding Spain) | 20.7 | 53.5% |
| Americas | 7.0 | 18.2% |
| Spain | 6.2 | 16.1% |
| Asia and Rest of the World | 4.7 | 12.2% |
