= Stradivarius (fashion retailer) =

Spanish women's fast fashion brand

Stradivarius España, S.A.
- Type: Subsidiary
- Industry: Retail
- Founded: 1994; 32 years ago, in Barcelona, Spain
- Headquarters: Sallent, Barcelona, Spain
- Number of locations: 915 (2021)
- Products: Clothing, accessories
- Revenue: ▲€1,824 billion (2021)
- Parent: Inditex
- Divisions: Stradivarius Diseño; Stradivarius Logística
- Website: www.stradivarius.com

Stradivarius (Spanish: [(e)stɾaðiˈβaɾjus] is a Spanish women's clothing fast fashion retailer founded in 1994 and owned by the Inditex group. As of 31 January 2022, Stradivarius is present with 915 stores in 62 countries.

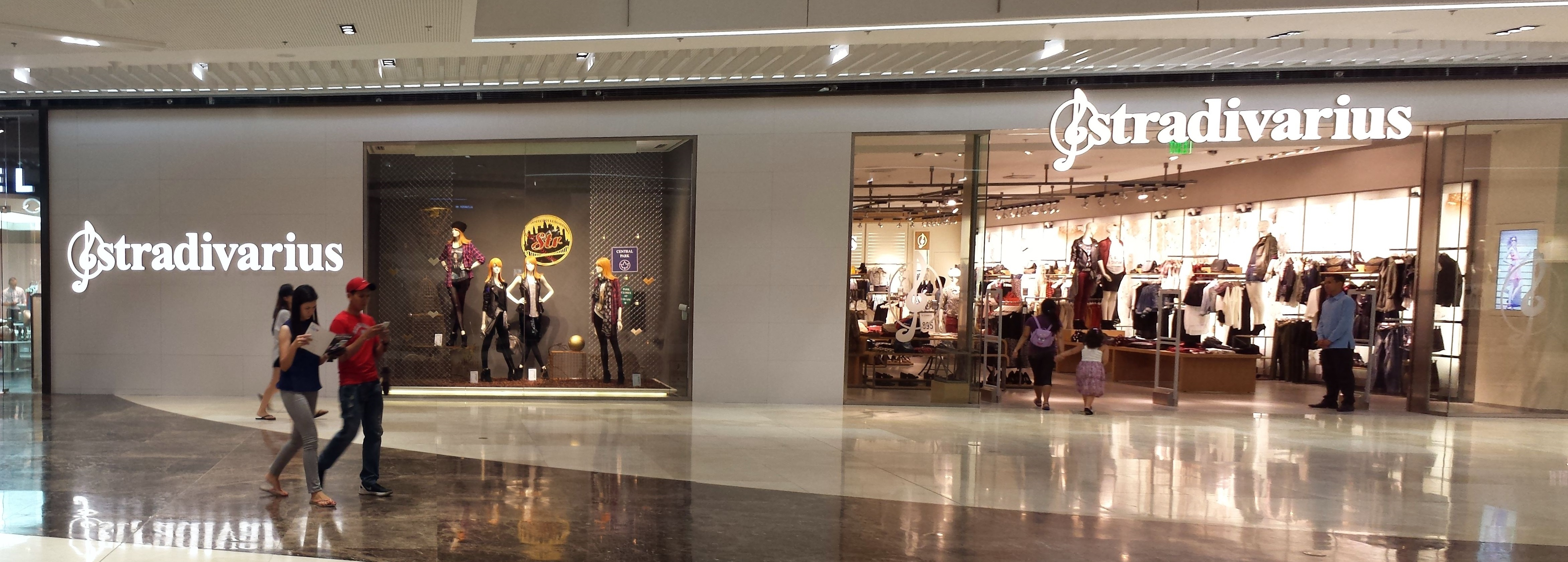
A Stradivarius clothing store at SM Aura in Bonifacio Global City, Metro Manila, Philippines in 2013

== History ==
Stradivarius was developed in 1994 by the Triquell family with an innovative concept for fashion in Barcelona, Spain. In 1999, Inditex purchased 90% of Stradivarius shares for €108 million and the remaining 10% in 2005, keeping Jordi Triquell, son of the founder, Francisco Triquell, as director.

One of the most characteristic symbols of the company is the treble clef which in the former logo is standing out for the substitution of the first "S" of the name for a treble clef, while for recent logos it is in front of the name.

On 1 February 2017, it launched the first fashion line for men under "Stradivarius Man" label, although in 2018 they decided to close it due to low sales.

In 2022, Stradivarius exited the Russian market due to the country's invasion of Ukraine.

== Ethical sourcing ==
In 2025, Stradivarius signed a brand letter of intent calling on the Australian wool industry to end the practice of mulesing.
