= Pull&Bear =

Spanish clothing and accessories retailer

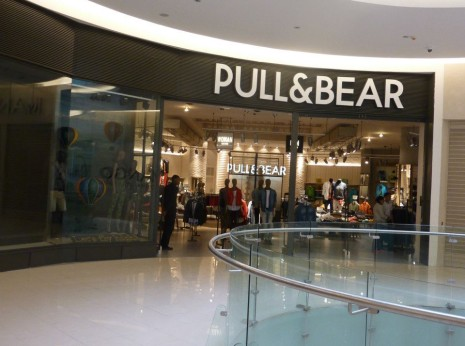
- A Pull&Bear shop in Santo Domingo, Dominican Republic.
- Type: Subsidiary
- Industry: Retail
- Predecessor: New Wear, S.A.fog
- Founded: 1991; 35 years ago
- Headquarters: Narón, A Coruña, Spain
- Number of locations: 864 (2021)
- Area served: Worldwide
- Products: Clothing
- Revenue: ▲€1.876 billion (2021)
- Number of employees: 3,000
- Parent: Inditex
- Divisions: Pull&Bear Diseño, S.L.; Pull&Bear Logística, S.A.
- Website: www.pullandbear.com

Pull&Bear (Spanish: [pul am ˈbeɾ]) is a Spanish clothing and accessories retailer based in Narón, A Coruña, Spain, founded in 1991. It is part of Inditex, owner of the Zara and Bershka brands.

== History ==
The chain was established in 1991 due to the diversification of Inditex's commercial objective, which at that time exclusively owned Zara shops. It started out as a brand for the male public only, but after a few years of its creation, it introduced a collection for the female public in 1998 which has equalled the male line in sales.

In 2010, the brand introduced a new logo and rebranded its European shops.

In February 2019, Pull&Bear joined forces with the sports brand Umbro to launch a line of sportswear products in a joint partnership.

In March 2022, Pull&Bear ceased operations in Russia in support of Ukraine.

== Description ==
Pull&Bear specialises in manufacturing and selling urban-style clothing and accessories. The brand uses US popular culture in its product design.

New product lines introduced in shops have diversified the range of products available in Pull&Bear outlets. These new lines include music, technology, video games and video images mixed in with clothing. Pull&Bear introduced the "XDYE" line in 1998, a more sporty and hi-tech line of clothes linked to the icons of 21st-century youth culture.

== Shops ==
The number of Pull&Bear shops in each country :

Africa:
- Algeria : 4
- Egypt: 6
- Morocco: 7
- Tunisia: 3
- Angola: 1
- Mozambique: 1
Americas:
- Mexico: 68
- Colombia: 9
- Ecuador: 3
- Guatemala: 3
- Costa Rica: 2
- El Salvador: 2
- Honduras: 2
- Panama: 2
- Dominican Republic: 2
- Nicaragua: 1
Asia:
- China: As from July 2022, Pull&Bear has closed all of its physical shops and is now operating exclusively online.
- Israel: 25
- Saudi Arabia: 18
- Indonesia: 15
- United Arab Emirates: 8
- Hong Kong: 6
- Lebanon: 5
- Kazakhstan: 5
- Qatar: 5
- Malaysia: 4
- Taiwan: 4
- Kuwait: 3
- Singapore: 3
- Thailand: 3
- Philippines: 3
- Jordan: 2
- South Korea: 1
- Bahrain: 1
- Macau: 1
- Vietnam: 1
- Uzbekistan: 1
Europe:
- Spain: 208
- Russia: As of 2023, all Pull&Bear stores have stopped operations in Russia in support for Ukraine.
- Italy: 56
- Portugal: 50
- France: 38
- Turkey: 34
- Poland: 32
- Greece: 25
- Romania: 23
- Ukraine: 14
- Germany: 11
- Netherlands: 11
- Belgium: 9
- Hungary: 10
- United Kingdom: 8
- Serbia: 7
- Croatia: 7
- Bulgaria: 6
- Cyprus: 5
- Austria: 4
- Bosnia-Herzegovina: 4
- Czech Republic: 4
- Ireland: 4
- Lithuania: 4
- Switzerland: 4
- Slovakia: 4
- Malta: 3
- Armenia: 3
- Azerbaijan: 2
- Belarus: 2
- Georgia: 2
- Latvia: 2
- North Macedonia: 2
- Slovenia: 2
- Albania: 1
- Andorra: 1
- Estonia: 1
- Kosovo: 1
- Luxembourg: 1
- Montenegro: 1
- Sweden: 1

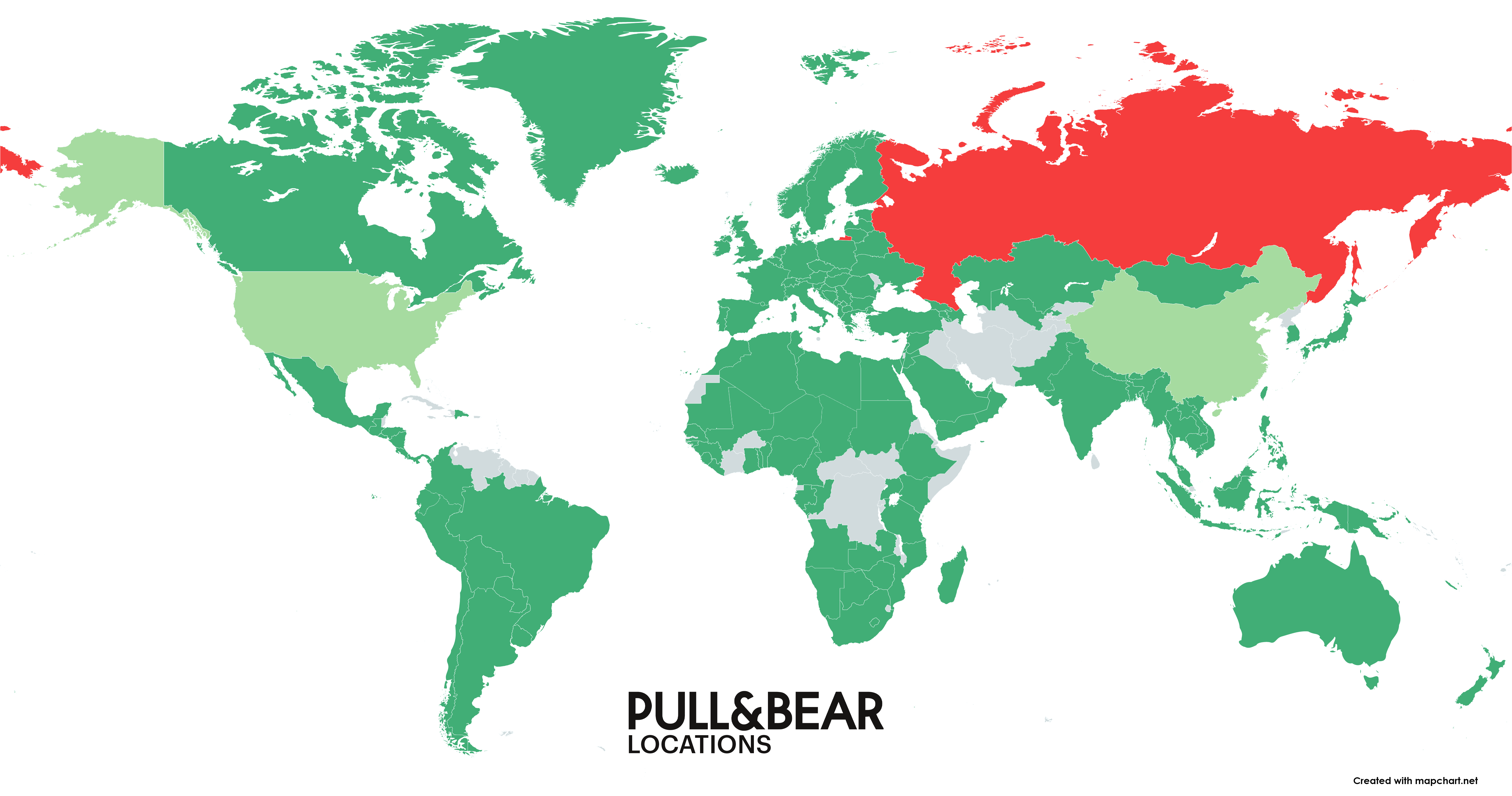
Pull&Bear store locations around the world.

== Ethical sourcing ==
In 2025, Pull&Bear signed a brand letter of intent calling on the Australian wool industry to end the practice of mulesing.
