= Zara Home =

Spanish home decoration company

- Logo used since 2023.

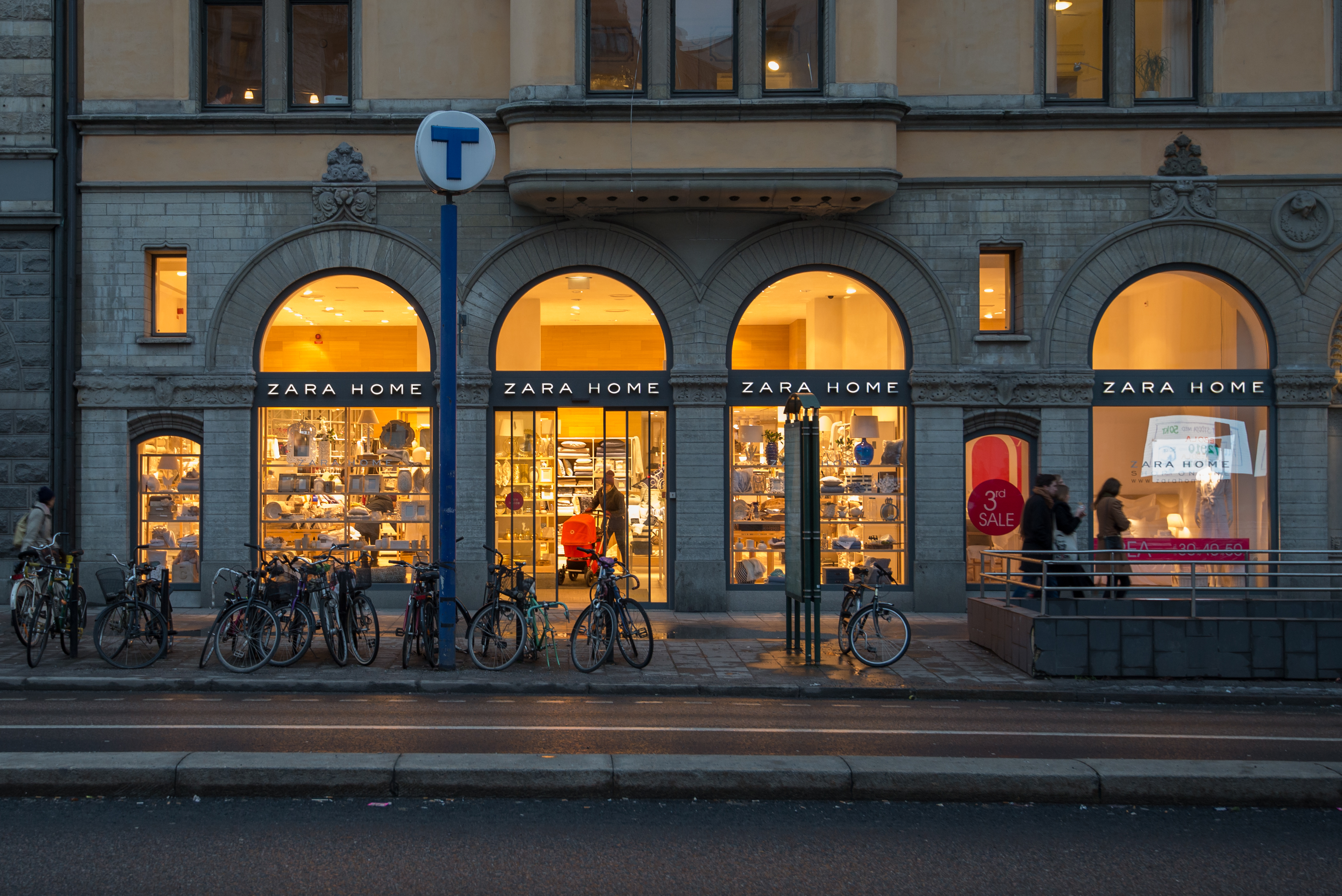
- Zara Home store in Stockholm.
- Company type: Subsidiary
- Industry: Retail
- Founded: 2003; 23 years ago
- Headquarters: A Coruña, Spain
- Number of locations: 391 stores (2025)
- Area served: Worldwide
- Products: Home furnishings
- Revenue: €830 million (2018)
- Parent: Inditex
- Website: www.zarahome.com

Zara Home is a retail chain company owned by the Spanish multinational group Inditex, specializing in home textiles and decoration. Founded in 2003 and headquartered in A Coruña, Spain, the company offers a wide range of products for the home, including bedding, tableware, furniture, home accessories, sleepwear and bathroom cosmetics. As of January 2025, it had 391 stores in 67 countries worldwide.

Zara Home focuses on contemporary, classic, ethnic and minimalist decor styles. Around 70% of its products are textiles, complemented by decorative items and kitchenware. The brand introduces two main collections annually and updates its product range biweekly.

== History ==
Zara Home logo used since 2003.

Zara Home was founded in August 2003, opening its first store in Marbella, Spain. By the end of that year, the company had expanded to 26 locations. In 2005, it launched Zara Home Kids, a product line dedicated to children’s home decor. In 2006, the company opened its first store in France, located in the Les Passages shopping centre in Boulogne-Billancourt, near Paris.

In 2007, Zara Home became the first brand within Inditex to launch an online store, initially available in 13 European countries. The brand later expanded its online operations to additional markets, including Australia, making it the first Inditex label to sell online in the Southern Hemisphere.

In 2012, Zara Home opened its first eco-friendly store in A Coruña. The following year, it inaugurated a flagship location on the Champs-Élysées in Paris, marking its commitment to high-end retail spaces.

By 2016, Zara Home had become the fastest-growing Inditex brand, recording a 16.2% increase in revenue and ending the year with €775 million in sales. It was also the second-fastest brand in terms of store openings that year, with a total of 552 locations worldwide.

After 2020, the number of Zara Home stores began to gradually decline each year, in line with Inditex's broader strategy to focus on larger, more prominent locations and expand its online presence.

== Gallery ==
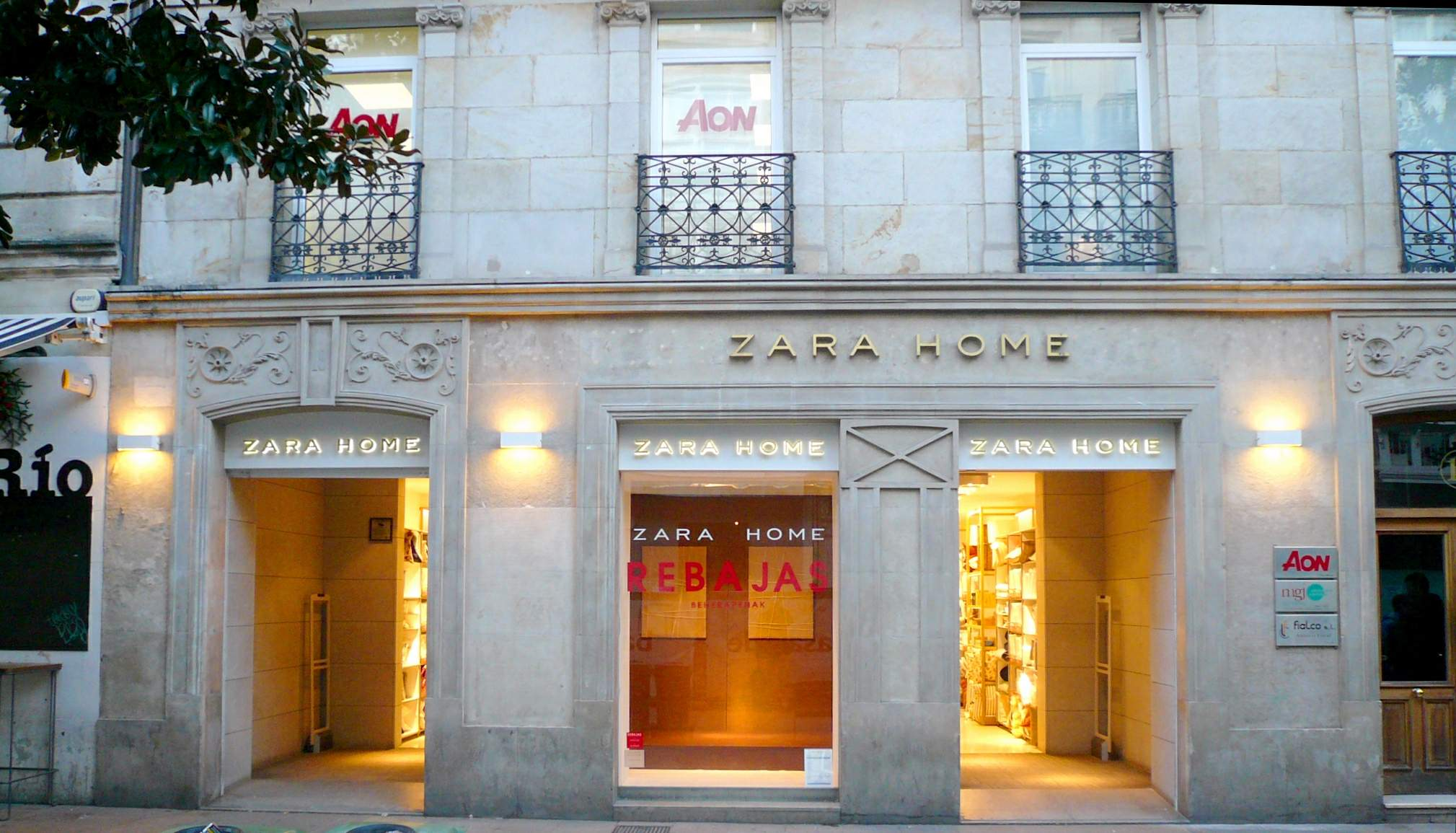
Zara Home store in Vitoria-Gasteiz, Spain

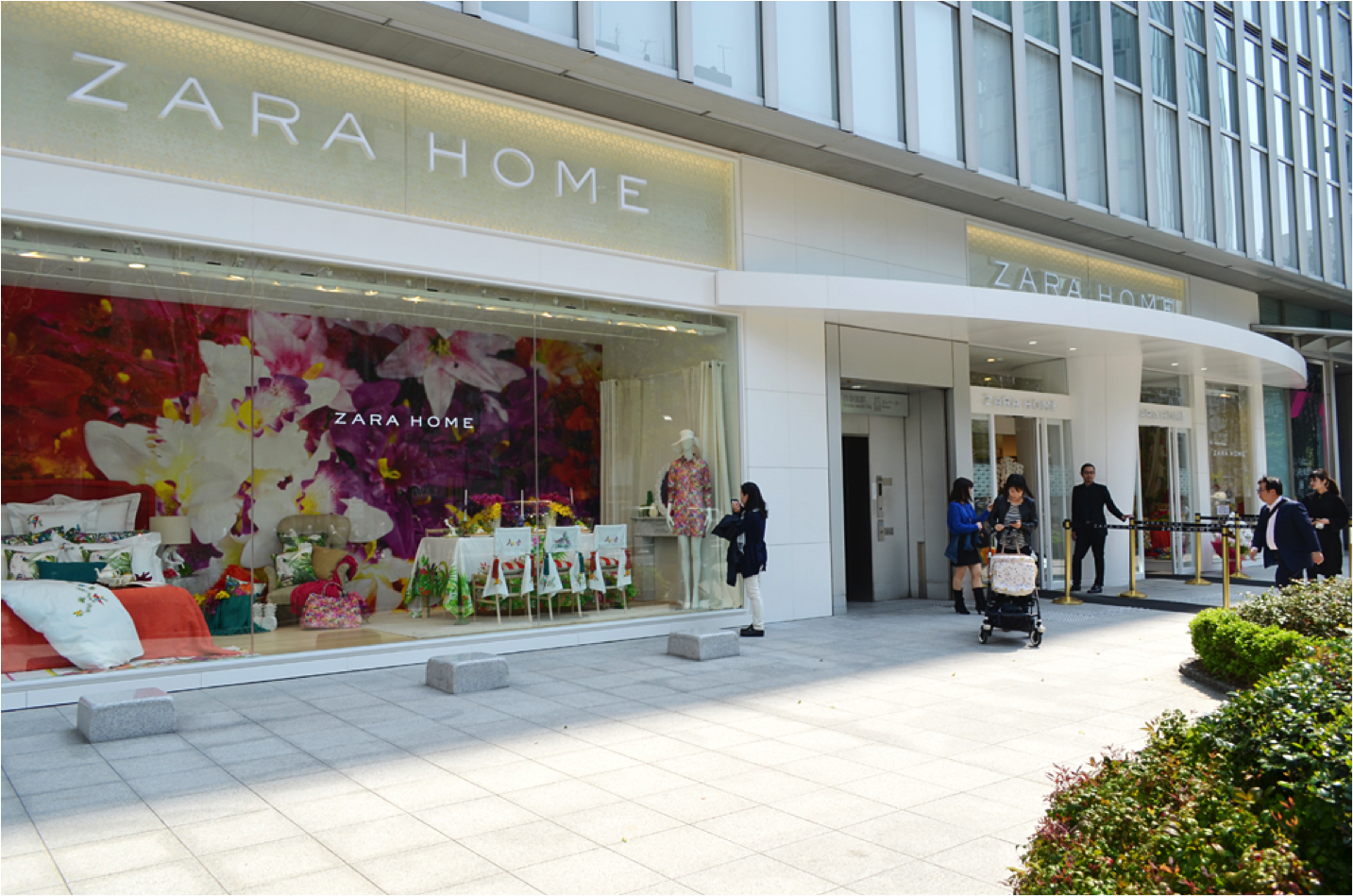
Zara Home store in Nagoya, Japan

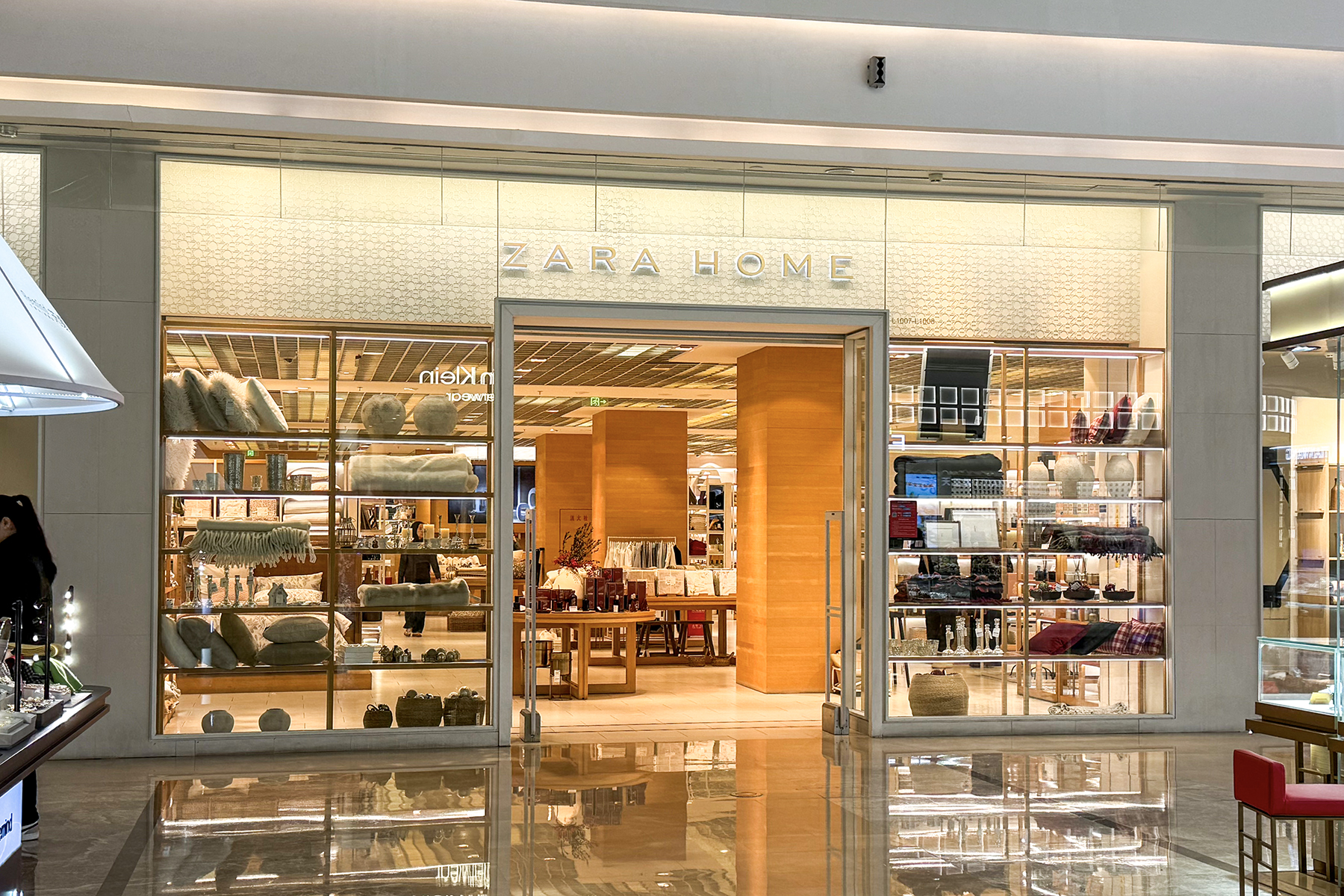
Zara Home store in Zhengzhou, China

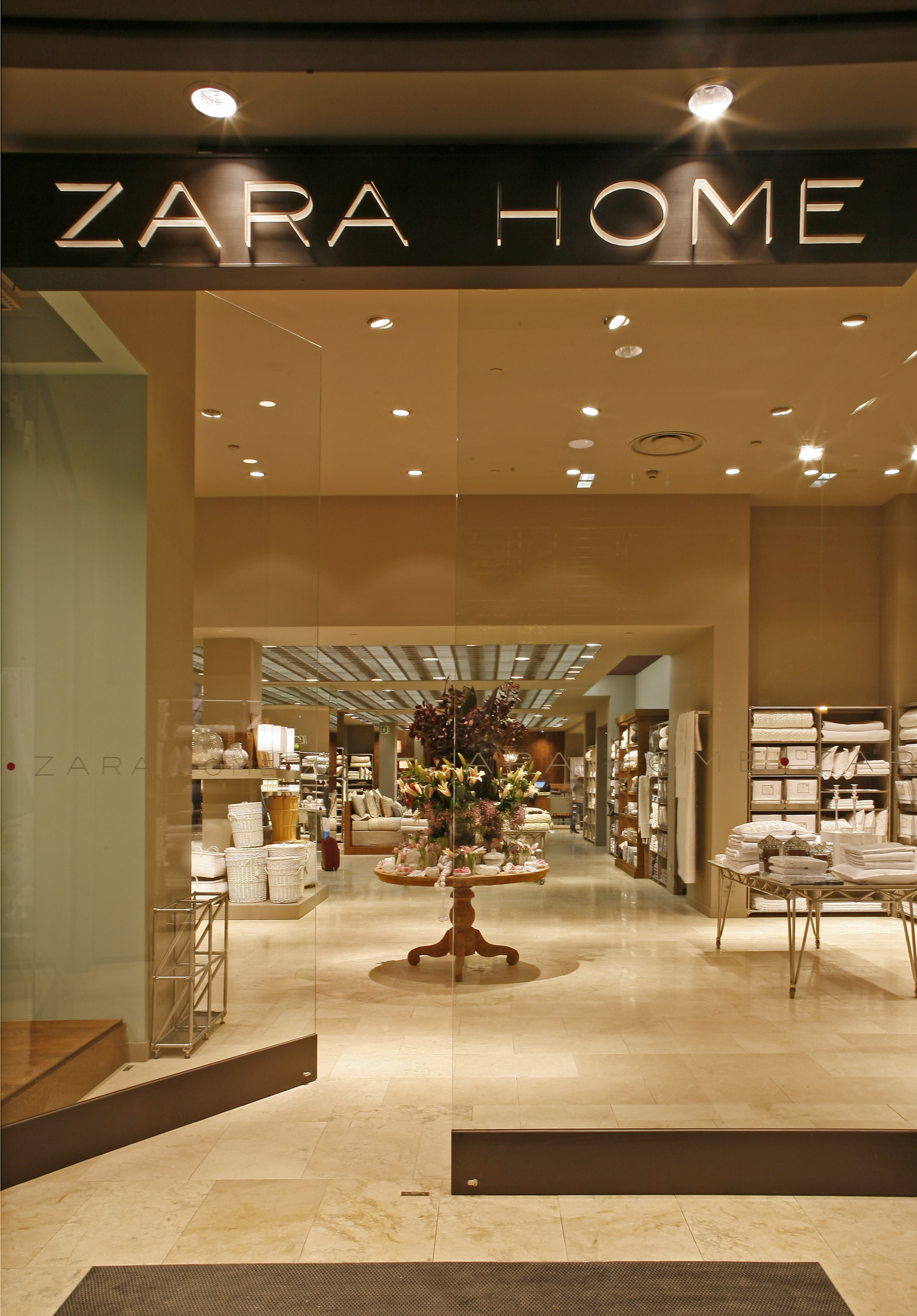
Zara Home store on Calle de Serrano, Madrid, Spain

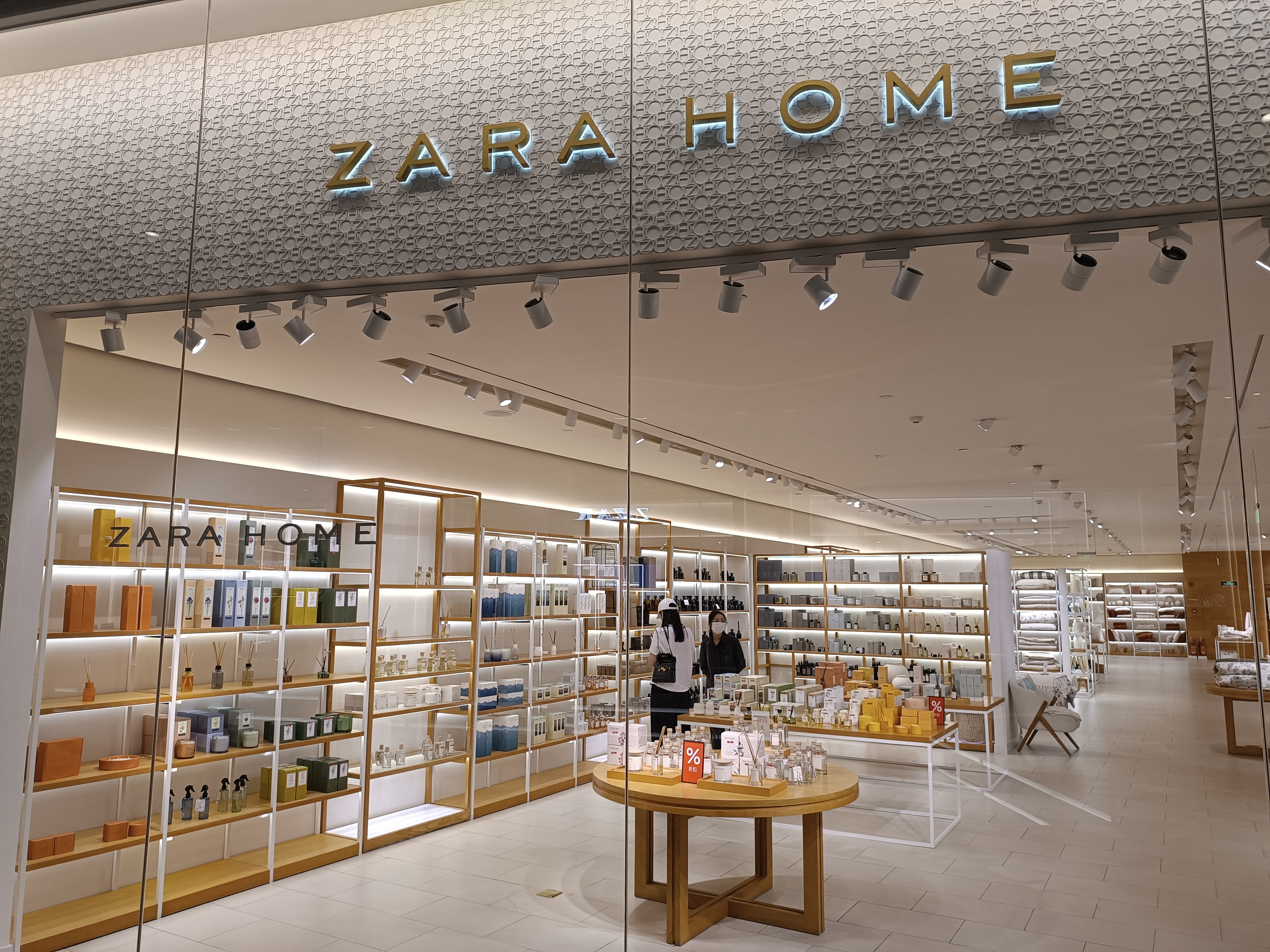
Zara Home store in Shenzhen, China
