= Oysho =

Spanish sportswear and athleisure company

Oysho España, S.A.
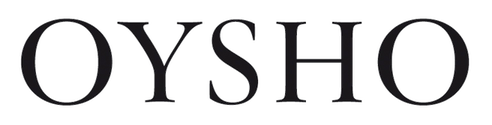

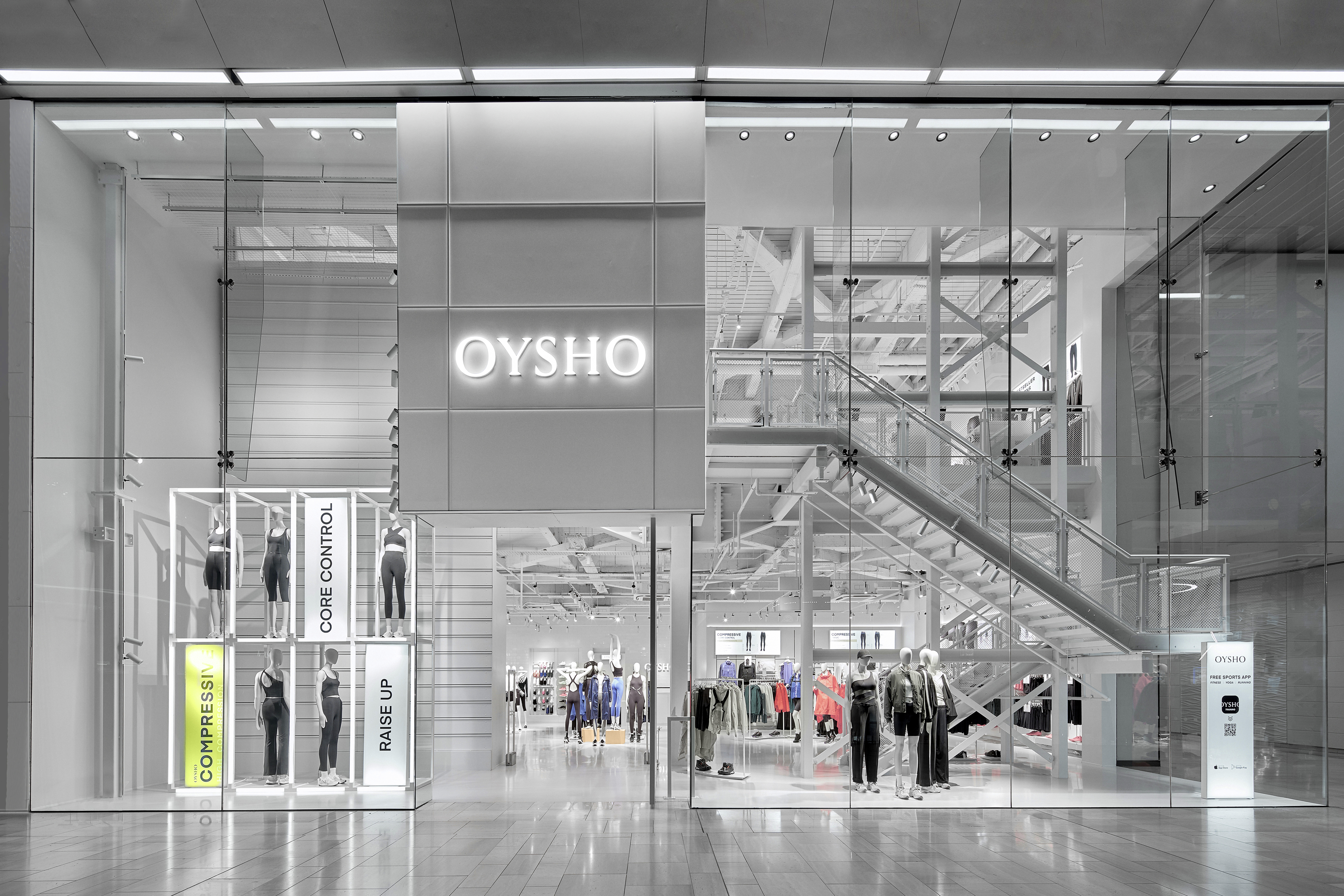
- OYSHO Store in London (United Kingdom)
- Type: Subsidiary
- Industry: Retail
- Founded: 2001; 25 years ago
- Headquarters: Tordera, Barcelona, Spain
- Number of locations: 457 (2023)
- Area served: Worldwide
- Products: Clothing
- Parent: Inditex
- Website: www.oysho.com

Oysho is a Spanish fashion chain specialising in sports and leisure wear, founded in 2001. Oysho is part of the Inditex group and operates in more than 50 countries, with a network of 433 physical stores and an online store.

== History ==
Oysho was created in 2001 as part of Inditex’s commercial diversification strategy. Initially focused on underwear and loungewear, the brand expanded its offering over the years to include a sportswear collection. Oysho currently defines itself as a sports and leisure brand, as its first line of business.

Over the years, Oysho has expanded into different countries, opening various stores in cities such as Paris, London, Istanbul, Israel, Lima, Beirut, and Shanghai.

Their online store was launched in 2011 and operates in several countries.

In 2022, they launched the Oysho Training app, which offers fitness, Pilates and running training programmes. The goal of the app is to provide the brand’s sporting community with quality content presented by international trainers. Content is available in Spanish, English, French, German, Turkish and Italian.

== Stores ==
Oysho has 433 stores worldwide, in more than 50 countries. Spain is its main market, followed by Mexico and Turkey.

The stores have an average sales floor space of 450m^{2}.

Oysho has stores in Rue Rivoli in Paris, Westfield London, on Gran Vía in Madrid, on Paseo de Gracia in Barcelona, in the Piazza San Babila in Milan, Dubai Mall, Shanghai, Israel, and many other locations.

In September 2024 Oysho opened its largest store in the world at the Jockey Plaza in Lima

== App ==
In September 2022, the company launched Oysho Training, a training app for fitness, yoga, Pilates and running. The app allows users to design a training plan tailored to their needs: they can choose their interests at the beginning during the onboarding process, or directly by filtering by duration and intensity. The app uses a recommendation engine that takes training sessions the user has already completed into account in order to offer new sessions, programmes and challenges.
