= Massimo Dutti =

Spanish multinational clothing retailer

Massimo Dutti, S.A.
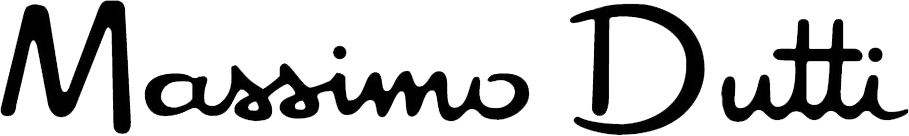

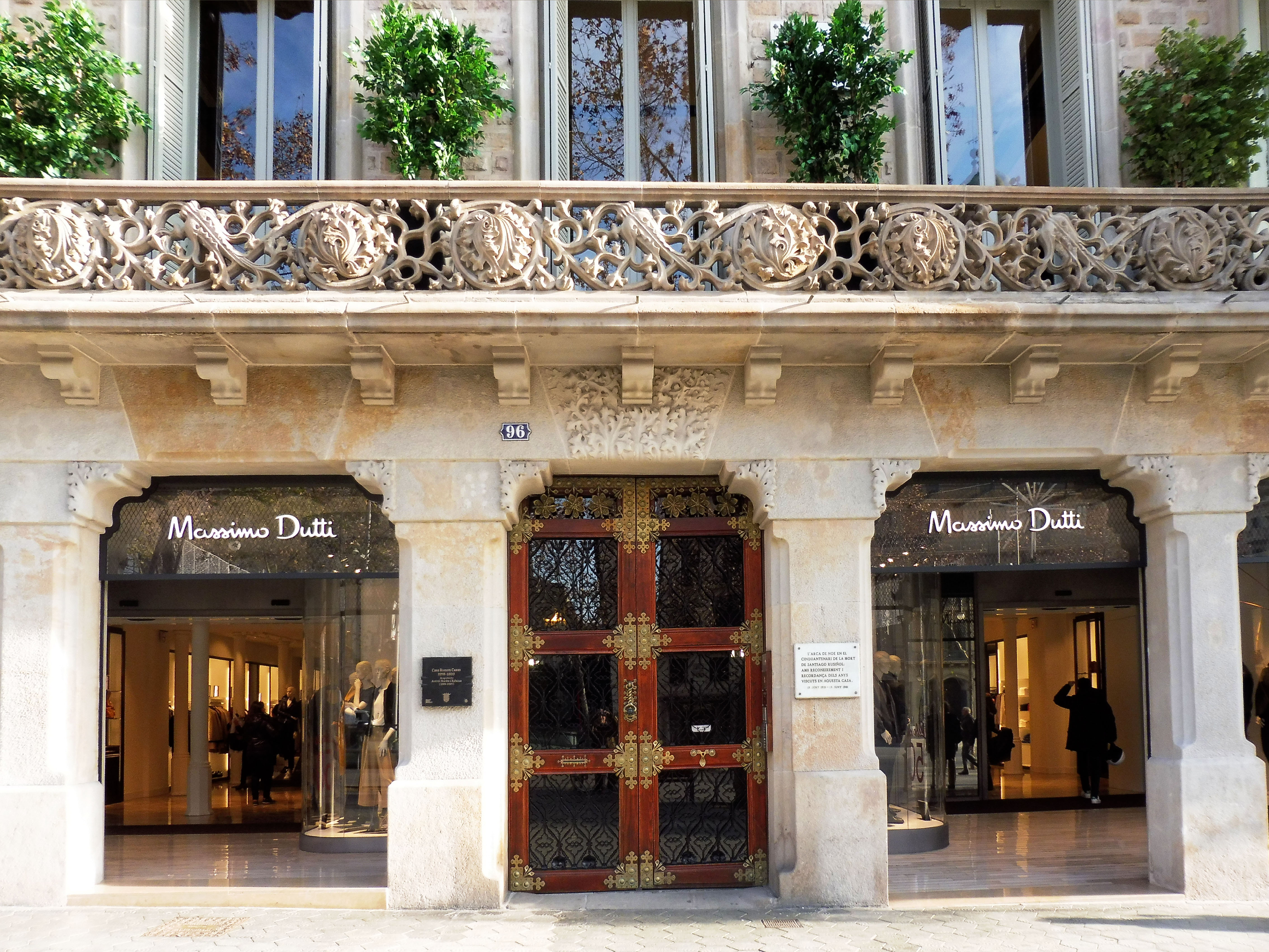
- Shop in the Passeig de Gràcia in Barcelona
- Type: Subsidiary
- Industry: Retail
- Founded: 1985; 41 years ago, in Spain
- Founder: Armando Lasauca
- Headquarters: Barcelona, Spain
- Number of locations: 642 (2021)
- Area served: Worldwide
- Products: Clothing
- Revenue: ▲€ 1.653 billion (2021)
- Number of employees: 10,000 (2024)
- Parent: Inditex
- Divisions: Massimo Dutti Diseño; Massimo Dutti Logística
- Website: www.massimodutti.com

Massimo Dutti, S.A. (Spanish pronunciation: [ˈmasimo ˈðuti]) is a Spanish premium clothing retailer specializing in cashmere and wool products, established in 1985 and owned by Spanish multinational company Inditex, the parent company of Zara, Pull&Bear, and other brands.

The offices of Massimo Dutti are located in Tordera (Barcelona), unlike Inditex which is located in Arteixo (A Coruña).

== Overview ==
Despite the Italian name, "Massimo Dutti" is not a fashion designer. The company employs over 10,000 people internationally. When founded in 1985, its product range was limited to menswear. Its women's range was added in 1995. In 2003, the company launched a children's line under the trade name Massimo Dutti Boys and Girls. As a higher-end brand within Inditex, it is more associated with the masstige market.

== History ==
In 1991 Inditex acquired 65% of the shares of the company before acquiring it fully in 1995. The company has diversified its supply and offers clothes for women and children, as well as perfumes.

== Markets and operations ==
It has 800 stores in 75 countries.

- Algeria
- Albania
- Andorra
- Armenia
- Austria
- Azerbaijan
- Belarus
- Belgium
- Bosnia and Herzegovina
- Brazil (to be opened in 2026)
- Bulgaria
- Canada
- Colombia
- Costa Rica
- Croatia
- Cyprus
- Czech Republic
- Dominican Republic
- Ecuador
- Estonia
- Finland
- France
- Georgia
- Egypt
- Germany
- Greece
- Guatemala
- Honduras
- Hungary
- India
- Indonesia
- Ireland
- Israel
- Italy
- Republic of Kazakhstan
- Kosovo
- Kuwait
- Latvia
- Lebanon
- Lithuania
- Luxembourg
- Republic of North Macedonia
- Malaysia
- Malta
- Mexico
- Netherlands
- Panama
- Philippines
- Poland
- Portugal
- Peru
- Qatar
- Romania
- Saudi Arabia
- Serbia
- Singapore
- Slovakia
- Slovenia
- Spain
- Sweden
- Switzerland
- Tunisia
- Taiwan
- Thailand
- Turkey
- Ukraine
- United Kingdom
- United States of America
- United Arab Emirates

== Puig fragrances ==
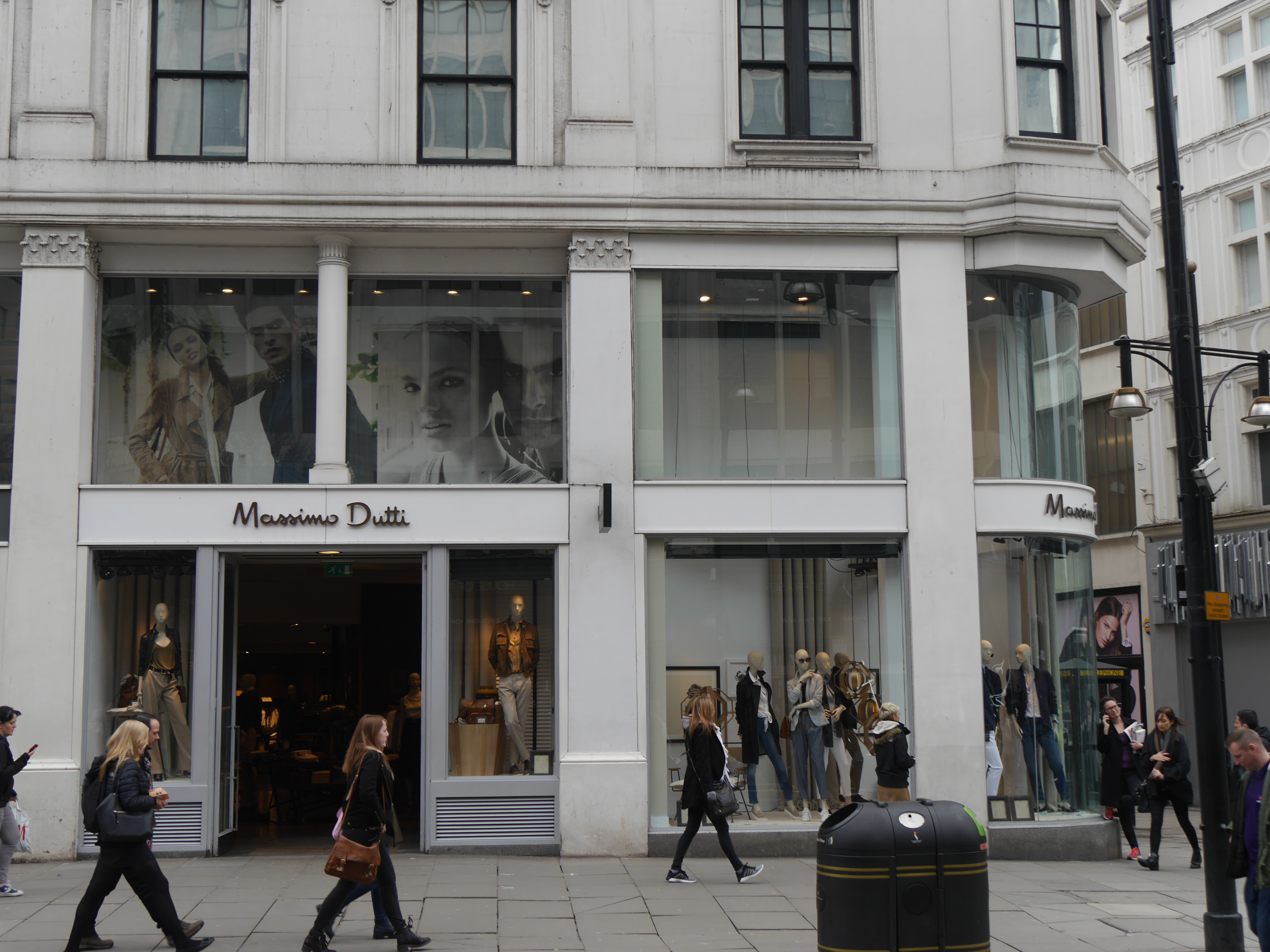
Massimo Dutti store in London.

Massimo Dutti fragrances are marketed by Puig Company.

The launch of six new fragrances happened at the end of October 2018— three fragrances for men and three for women. While the existing Massimo Dutti fragrance line was distributed in a network of multi-brand retailers such as Douglas, El Corte Ingles and Amazon.com, the new collection is sold exclusively by Massimo Dutti in 400 Massimo Dutti stores and online in a total of 32 markets.

== Philanthropy ==
In line with its social commitment, Massimo Dutti has, since 2001, worked with mental health and disability charities specialising in social rehabilitation and professional work placement programmes for individuals with severe mental disorders or physical disabilities. Massimo Dutti was the first Inditex brand to be part of the for&from programme and now has three stores in Spain managed by and providing long-term employment for people with disabilities: Allariz (Ourense), Llagostera (Barcelona) and Igualada (Barcelona).
