= List of companies of Spain =

Location of Spain

Spain is a sovereign state located on the Iberian Peninsula in Southern Europe. It is a middle power and a major developed country with the world's fourteenth largest economy by nominal GDP and sixteenth largest by purchasing power parity. It is a member of the United Nations (UN), the European Union (EU), the Eurozone, the Council of Europe (CoE), the Organization of Ibero-American States (OEI), the North Atlantic Treaty Organization (NATO), the Organisation for Economic Co-operation and Development (OECD), the Schengen Area, the World Trade Organization (WTO) and many other international organisations. Spain has a "permanent invitation" to the G20 summits that occur generally once a year.

For further information on the types of business entities in this country and their abbreviations, see "Business entities in Spain".

== Largest firms ==
This list displays all 9 Spanish companies in the Fortune Global 500, which ranks the world's largest companies by annual revenue. The figures below are given in millions of US dollars and are for the fiscal year 2018. Also listed are the headquarters location, net profit, number of employees worldwide and industry sector of each company.

Rank	Fortune 500 rank	Name	Industry	Revenue (USD millions)	Profits (USD millions)	Employees	Headquarters
1	85	Banco Santander	Banking	90,531	9,217	194,015	Santander
2	176	Telefónica	Telecommunications	57,466	3,931	120,138	Madrid
3	200	Repsol	Oil and gas	53,176	2,762	22,735	Madrid
4	234	Banco Bilbao Vizcaya Argentaria	Banking	47,608	6,283	125,627	Bilbao
5	272	ACS Group	Construction	43,263	1,080	195,461	Madrid
6	292	Iberdrola	Electric utility	41,395	3,557	33,216	Bilbao
7	406	Inditex	Retail	30,686	4,042	174,386	Arteixo
8	430	Naturgy	Gas utility	29,123	−3,330	13,945	Madrid
9	452	Mapfre	Insurance	27,423	624	76,913	Majadahonda

== Notable firms ==
This list includes notable companies with primary headquarters located in the country. The industry and sector follow the Industry Classification Benchmark taxonomy. Organizations which have ceased operations are included and noted as defunct.

Notable companies Status: P=Private, S=State; A=Active, D=Defunct
Name	Industry	Sector	Headquarters	Founded	Notes	Status	
Abengoa	Conglomerates	-	Seville	1941	Energy, telecommunications, transportation, environment	P	D
Acciona	Industrials	Heavy construction	Alcobendas	1997	Construction	P	A
Acerinox	Basic materials	Iron & steel	Madrid	1970	Steel	P	A
ACS Group	Industrials	Heavy construction	Madrid	1997	Construction	P	A
Afinsa	Consumer services	Specialty retailers	Madrid	1980	Collectibles, defunct	P	D
Almirall	Health care	Pharmaceuticals	Barcelona	1943	Pharmaceutical	P	A
Amadeus IT Group	Technology	Software	Madrid	1987	Travel and tourism software	P	A
Arteche Group	Utilities	Power industry	Mungia	1946	Energy	P	A
Astilleros y Talleres del Noroeste	Industrials	Shipbuilding	Fene	1944	Shipbuilding, defunct 2004	P	D
Atresmedia	Consumer services	Broadcasting & entertainment	San Sebastián de los Reyes	1988	Entertainment	P	A
Balay	Consumer goods	Durable household products	Zaragoza	1947	Appliances, part of BSH Hausgeräte (Germany)	P	A
Banco Bilbao Vizcaya Argentaria (BBVA)	Financials	Banks	Bilbao	1857	Banking group	P	A
Banco Popular Español	Financials	Banks	Madrid	1926	Banking, part of Banco Santander	P	A
Banco Sabadell	Financials	Banks	Sabadell	1881	Banking	P	A
Banco Santander	Financials	Banks	Santander	1857	Banking, largest bank in Europe as of Fall 2008	P	A
Banesto	Financials	Banks	Madrid	1902	Banking, part of Banco Santander	P	A
Bankinter	Financials	Banks	Madrid	1965	Banking	P	A
Bassols 1790	Consumer goods	Textiles	Vic	1790	Textiles	P	A
Bolsas y Mercados Españoles (BME)	Financials	Banks	Madrid	1831	Bolsas y Mercados Españoles, exchange	P	A
BRB Internacional	Consumer services	Broadcasting & entertainment	Alcobendas	1972	Media	P	A
Budgetplaces	Consumer services	Travel & tourism	Barcelona	2003	Hospitality	P	A
Calidad Pascual	Consumer goods	Food & beverage	Madrid	1969	Dairy, water	P	A
CATUAV	Industrials	Aerospace	Moià	2007	Drone manufacturer	P	A
Chupa Chups	Consumer goods	Food products	Barcelona	1958	Confectionery, part of Perfetti Van Melle (Italy)	P	A
CIE Automotive	Consumer goods	Auto parts	Bilbao	2002	Automotive components, alternative propulsion, biodiesel	P	A
Cintra	Industrials	Heavy construction	Madrid	1998	Infrastructure	P	A
Cepsa	Oil & gas	Exploration & production	Madrid	1929	Petroleum, owned by Mubadala Investment Company (UAE)	P	A
Compañía Logística de Hidrocarburos (CLH)	Utilities	Oil & gas distribution	Madrid	1927	Pipelines, transportation and storage of oil products	P	A
Construcciones Aeronáuticas SA (CASA)	Industrials	Aerospace	Madrid	1923	Aeronautics, defunct 1999, absorbed into EADS/Airbus	P	D
Construcciones y Auxiliar de Ferrocarriles (CAF)	Industrials	Commercial vehicles & trucks	Beasain	1917	Railway vehicles & equipment manufacturing	P	A
Copisa	Industrials	Heavy construction	Barcelona	1959	Construction contracting	P	A
Correos	Industrials	Delivery services	Madrid	1716	Postal service	S	A
Cortefiel	Consumer services	Apparel retailers	Madrid	1880	Clothing retailer	P	A
Cupra	Consumer goods	Automobiles	Martorell	2018	part of SEAT	P	A
Curaxys	Health care	Biotechnology	Cádiz	2009	Biopharmaceutical	P	A
Deoleo	Consumer goods	Food products	Córdoba	1955	Food processing	P	A
DIA	Consumer services	Food retailers & wholesalers	Las Rozas	1979	Groceries	P	A
Duro Felguera	Basic materials	Equipment goods	Gijón	1858	Electricity, natural gas, oil	P	A
Ebro Foods	Consumer goods	Food products	Madrid	1998	Food processing	P	A
Ebro trucks	Consumer goods	Automobiles	Barcelona	1954	Manufacturing; Nissan Motors took complete control of Motors Iberica, Ebro Trucks umbrella company, in 1987	P	D
El Corte Inglés	Consumer services	Food retailers & wholesalers	Madrid	1940	Groceries	P	A
Enagás	Utilities	Oil & gas distribution	Madrid	1972	Natural gas distribution & transportation	P	A
Endesa	Utilities	Conventional electricity	Madrid	1944	Energy, part of Enel (Italy)	P	A
Eroski	Consumer services	Food retailers & wholesalers	Elorrio	1969	Groceries, part of Mondragon Corporation	P	A
Esteve	Health care	Pharmaceuticals	Barcelona	1929	Pharmaceutical	P	A
Euskaltel	Telecommunications	Fixed line telecommunications	Derio	1995	Fibre optics	P	A
Fagor	Consumer goods	Durable household products	Mondragón	1956	Appliances, defunct 2013, owns the brands Edesa, Aspes, Mastercook, Brandt and De Dietrich, part of Mondragon Corporation	P	D
Ferrovial	Industrials	Heavy construction	Madrid	1952	Construction	P	A
Festina	Consumer goods	Clothing & accessories	Barcelona	1902	Watches	P	A
Fierro Group	Conglomerates	-	Madrid	1961	Industrials, financials	P	A
Fomento de Construcciones y Contratas	Industrials	Heavy construction	Barcelona	1900	Construction	P	A
Gamesa	Oil & gas	Renewable energy equipment	Zamudio	1976	Renewable energy	P	A
GMV Innovating Solutions	Conglomerates	-	Tres Cantos	1984	Aeronautics, financials, defense & security, health care, information security, transportation, telecommunications	P	A
Grundig mobile	Technology	Telecommunications equipment	Málaga	2005	Manufacturing, defunct 2008	P	D
Grupo Agbar	Utilities	Water	Barcelona	1867	Water services, distribution, treatment	P	A
Grupo Antolin	Consumer goods	Auto parts	Burgos	1950	Automotive interiors	P	A
Grupo Calvo	Consumer goods	Food products	Carballo	1940	Food, fishing	P	A
Grupo Gea Perona	Utilities	Oil & gas distribution	Murcia	1927	Oil & gas distribution	P	A
Grupo Lo Monaco	Consumer goods	Furnishings	Granada	1996	Mattresses	P	A
Hijos de Rivera	Consumer goods	Brewers	A Coruña	1906	Brewery	P	A
Hipercor	Consumer services	Food retailers & wholesalers	Madrid	1979	Groceries, part of El Corte Inglés	P	A
Iberdrola	Utilities	Conventional electricity	Bilbao	1992	Energy	P	A
Iberia	Consumer services	Airlines	Madrid	1927	Flag carrier airline	P	A
Idilia Foods	Consumer goods	Food products	Barcelona	1940	Food processing	P	A
Inditex	Consumer services	Apparel retailers	Arteixo	1985	World's largest clothing retailer and owns brands like Zara, Massimo Dutti, Bershka, Pull and Bear, Oysho, Zara Home, Often and Stradivarius	P	A
Indra Sistemas	Industrials	Aerospace	Madrid	1993	Aeronautics, defence	P	A
Inmobiliaria Colonial	Financials	Real estate holding & development	Madrid	1946	Real estate	P	A
Irizar	Industrials	Commercial vehicles & trucks	Ormaiztegi	1889	Bus manufacturing	P	A
Joma	Consumer goods	Clothing & accessories	Portillo de Toledo	1965	Clothing	P	A
Kelme	Consumer services	Apparel retailers	Elche	1977	Retail	P	A
La Caixa	Financials	Banks	Valencia	1990	Banking	P	A
La Casera	Consumer services	Food retailers & wholesalers	Madrid	1949	Groceries, part of Cadbury (UK)	P	A
Lacasa	Consumer goods	Food products	Zaragoza	1852	Confectionery	P	A
Lladró	Consumer goods	Recreational products	Tavernes Blanques	1953	Handcraft	P	A
Llaollao	Consumer goods	Food products	Murcia	2009	Food	P	A
Mahou San Miguel	Consumer goods	Brewers	Madrid	1890	Brewery	P	A
Majorica	Consumer goods	Clothing & accessories	Palma	1890	Pearls	P	A
Mango	Consumer services	Apparel retailers	Palau-solità i Plegamans	1984	Clothing retail	P	A
Mapfre	Financials	Full line insurance	Majadahonda	1933	Insurance	P	A
Marfeel	Technology	Software	Barcelona	2011	Cloud services	P	A
Mediaset España Comunicación	Consumer services	Broadcasting & entertainment	Madrid	1989	Broadcasting	P	A
Meliá Hotels International	Consumer services	Hotels	Palma	1956	Hotels	P	A
Mercadona	Consumer services	Food retailers & wholesalers	Tavernes Blanques	1977	Groceries	P	A
Mondragon Corporation	Conglomerates	-	Mondragón	1956	Includes Orbea, Eroski, Fagor and Irizar	P	A
Mutua Madrileña	Financials	Full line insurance	Madrid	1930	Insurance non-profit	P	A
Naipes Heraclio Fournier	Industrials	Recreational products	Vitoria-Gasteiz	1868	Manufacturing, part of Newell Brands (US)	P	A
Naturgy	Utilities	Oil & gas distribution	Madrid	1991	Natural gas distribution & transportation	P	A
Natra	Conglomerates	-	Valencia	1943	Consumer goods, pharmaceuticals	P	A
Navantia	Industrials	Shipbuilding	Madrid	2005	Shipbuilding, defence ships	S	A
NH Hotel Group	Consumer services	Hotels	Madrid	1978	Hotel chain	P	A
Obrascón Huarte Lain	Industrials	Heavy construction	Madrid	1999	Construction	P	A
Orbea	Consumer goods	Recreational products	Mallabia	1931	Bicycles	P	A
Pacha Group	Consumer services	Travel & tourism	Ibiza	1967	Entertainment	P	A
Pescanova	Consumer goods	Food products	Redondela	1960	Food, fishing	P	A
Planeta Group	Consumer services	Publishing	Barcelona	1949	Publishing	P	A
Porcelanosa	Industrials	Building materials & fixtures	Villarreal	1973	Manufacturing	P	A
PRISA TV	Consumer services	Broadcasting & entertainment	Tres Cantos	1989	Broadcasting	P	A
Private Media Group	Consumer services	Broadcasting & entertainment	Barcelona	1965	Media	P	A
Prosegur	Industrials	Business support services	Madrid	1976	Multinational security	P	A
Pyro Studios	Technology	Software	Alcobendas	1996	Video game developer	P	A
Red Eléctrica de España	Utilities	Conventional electricity	Alcobendas	1985	Energy grid	P	A
Renfe	Consumer services	Travel & tourism	Madrid	2005	Passenger rail	S	A
Repsol	Oil & gas	Integrated oil & gas	Madrid	1987	Petroleum	P	A
RTVE	Consumer services	Broadcasting & entertainment	Madrid	2007	State media	S	A
RIU Hotels	Consumer services	Hotels	Palma	1953	Hotels	P	A
Sacyr	Industrials	Heavy construction	Madrid	1999	Construction	P	A
Santana Motor	Consumer goods	Automobiles	Linares	1956	Automotive, defunct 2011	P	D
SEAT	Consumer goods	Automobiles	Martorell	1950	Automotive, part of Volkswagen Group (Germany)	P	A
SENER	Industrials	Heavy construction	Getxo	1956	Construction and engineering	P	A
Talgo	Industrials	Commercial vehicles & trucks	Las Rozas de Madrid	1942	Railway vehicles engineering	P	A
Técnicas Reunidas	Oil & gas	Oil equipment & services	Madrid	1959	Oil and gas infrastructure	P	A
Telefónica	Telecommunications	Fixed line telecommunications	Madrid	1924	Telecom, broadband	P	A
Telepizza	Consumer services	Restaurants & bars	Madrid	1987	Pizza chain	P	A
Terra	Technology	Internet	Madrid	1999	Internet	P	A
Uralita Group	Industrials	Building materials & fixtures	Madrid	1907	Building materials	P	A
UROVESA	Consumer goods	Automobiles	Santiago de Compostela	1981	Heavy vehicles	P	A
Vidal	Consumer goods	Food products	Molina de Segura	1963	Confectionery	P	A
Vitelcom	Consumer goods	Consumer electronics	Málaga	2001	Electronics, defunct 2008	P	D
Vodafone Spain	Telecommunications	Mobile telecommunications	Madrid	2000	Mobile network, part of Vodafone (UK)	P	A
Vueling	Consumer services	Airlines	Barcelona	2004	Low-cost airline	P	A
Zara	Consumer services	Apparel retailers	Arteixo	1974	Retailer, part of Inditex	P	A
Zinkia Entertainment	Consumer services	Broadcasting & entertainment	Madrid	2001	Entertainment	P	A

== See also ==
- List of largest Spanish companies
- List of companies based in the Canary Islands
