= Bassols =

Bassols (Catalan pronunciation: [βəˈsɔls]) is a surname of Catalan origin. It can refer to:

== People ==
- Claudia Bassols (born 1979), Spanish actress from Catalonia
- Isabel Gómez-Bassols, Cuban-born American psychologist and writer
- Marina Bassols Ribera (born 1999), Catalan tennis player
- Narciso Bassols (1897–1959), Mexican Politician
- Ramón Lázaro de Dou y de Bassols (1742–1832), Spanish professor and priest
- Xavier Montsalvatge i Bassols (1912–2002), Spanish composer and music critic

== Other ==
- Bassols 1790, probably the oldest still active textile company in the world
