= Thomas Stapleton (paediatrician) =

British paediatrician (1920–2007)

- Born: 1 February 1920; Lynton
- Died: 15 November 2007 (aged 87); Lane End
- Occupation: Pediatrician
- Employer: University of Sydney (1960–1986)
- Awards: Fellow of the Royal College of Physicians; Fellow of the Royal Australasian College of Physicians; Fellow of the Royal College of Paediatrics and Child Health
- Branch: British Army

Thomas Stapleton (1920-2007) was a British paediatrician who worked in Australia.

== Early life ==
Stapleton was born on 1 February 1920 in Lynton, Devon, England, with Anglo-Irish heritage. His maternal ancestors included John Nicholson of the East India Company.

Stapleton attended The King's School, Canterbury and then University College, Oxford.

== Career ==
Upon qualifying, during World War II, he joined the Royal Army Medical Corps in India, and while with them became a Doctor of Medicine (DM). A travelling scholarship then allowed him to study electrolyte physiology at Boston Children's Hospital, under Dr Gamble. He next had a job lecturing at St Mary's Hospital, London's paediatric unit, where he rose to be assistant director. While at St Mary's he was heavily influenced by the work of Donald Winnicott. In 1960 he went to the University of Sydney as Commonwealth professor of paediatrics. He was the second person to occupy that chair, succeeding Lorimer Dods. At the same time, he became director of the Institute of Child Health, Sydney and was shortly afterwards made a member of New South Wales' Child Welfare Advisory Council. He served as secretary‐general (1965–1974, succeeding Guido Fanconi) and treasurer (1974–1977) to the International Paediatric Association, about which he also wrote a history, published in the last year of his life. Reviewing the book in 2008 Rolf Zetterström noted that it was "in some respects [...] more Stapleton's autobiography than a book about IPA" and credited him with "important contributions to paediatrics, such as the elucidation of a near-epidemic of hyper-calcaemia in infants, due to overdosage of vitamin D."

Stapleton was a co-founder of the European Society for Paediatric Research, in 1959, and of the Neonatal Society.

For many years collaborated with the China's Fourth Military Medical University, in Xi'an, hosting their students at Sydney (and later England) and in 2004, donating £200,000 to set up a scholarship there in his name.

Stapleton held an honorary MD from Sydney, and was a Fellow of the Royal College of Physicians (FRCP(Lond)), a Fellow of the Royal Australasian College of Physicians (FRACP) and a Fellow of the Royal College of Paediatrics and Child Health (FRCPCH).

== Retirement and legacy ==
He retired in 1986 to his home, The Foundry Cottage, in Lane End, High Wycombe, where he was host to a number of postgraduate medical students from China and the then Soviet Union, as well as Japan, Pakistan and Thailand, who lodged with him at no charge while undertaking research at the University of Oxford medical school. In 2006 he became the first medical recipient of the gold medal of the Foreign Friends of China, given by the Chinese Government to foreigners who have made outstanding contributions to Chinese development, for his work with the Fourth Military Medical University. During his lifetime he made over 40 visits to China.

He described himself as a pacifist.

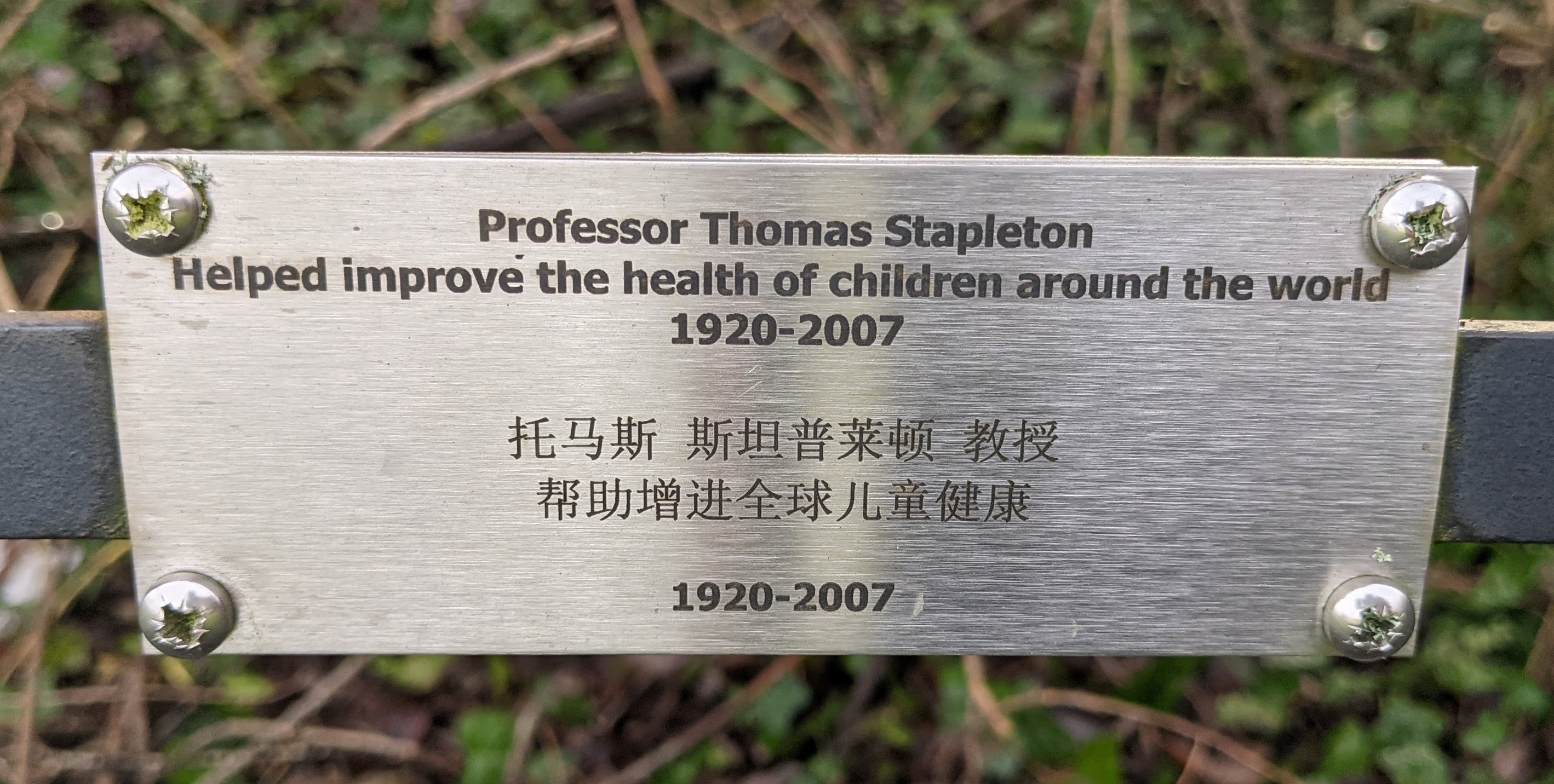
Memorial bench, Lane End, near High Wycombe

He died at home on 15 November 2007. He had been unmarried and had no children, and bequeathed much of his estate to fund the continued hosting of further overseas researchers. Obituaries were published in The Times, the British Medical Journal, Medical Journal of Australia, and the Herald-Sun News-Pictorial in Melbourne. The latter said he had had access to world leaders including Indira Gandhi, Mao Zedong and Yakubu Gowon.

A memorial bench at Lane End commemorates his life, with a plaque noting that he "Helped improve the health of children around the world", in English and Chinese.

== Works ==
- The History of the International Paediatric Association. published privately. 2007.
