= Elga (given name) =

Name list

Elga is a given name, usually feminine.

== People ==
- Elga Andersen (1935–1994), German actress
- Elga Brink (1905–1985), German actress
- Elga L. Jefferies (born 1946), American politician
- Elga Mark-Kurik (born 1928), Estonian paleontologist
- Elga Sesemann (1922–2007), Finnish artist
- Elga Meta Shearer (1883–1967), American educator
- Elga Olga Svendsen (1906–1992), Danish film actress, singer
- Elga Ruth Wasserman (1924–2014), German-born American chemist, college administrator

== Fictional characters ==
- Elga, a character in Shaman (novel) (2013) by Kim Stanley Robinson
- Countess Elga, a character in the 1980 horror film The Sleep of Death
- Dark Dragon Elga, a dragon character in the 2009 game Dragon Saga

== Other uses ==
- Elga coal mine
- ELGA LabWater, a brand of laboratory water
- Elgå Church, in Norway

== See also ==
- Elsa (given name)
- Elza (given name)
- Helga
