= Carapelle (disambiguation) =

Carapelle is a town in to the province of Foggia, Apulia, Italy.

Carapelle may also refer to:

- Carapelle Calvisio, town in the province of L'Aquila, Abruzzo, Italy
- Carapelle (river), river in the province of Foggia, Apulia, Italy

== See also ==
- Carapelli
