= ELGA LabWater =

Laboratory

ELGA LabWater is the laboratory water brand name of Veolia Water Solutions & Technologies. ELGA manufactures, supplies and services water purification systems for use in general, R&D, healthcare and clinical laboratories. Its offices and distributors are located in more than 60 countries.

== History ==
ELGA Products Limited was founded in 1937 by Walter Lorch to manufacture domestic electrical appliances, but moved into water purification to overcome the problem of limescale deposits in steam irons. It developed a small cartridge-type deionizer to purify the water. ELGA collaborated with the London School of Pharmacy to develop products aimed at the hospital market, laboratories and general industry. A manufacturing unit was set up in 1959 in Lane End, Buckinghamshire, UK. During the 1960s ELGA became a global supplier of water purification systems. ELGA Group PLC was incorporated in 1984 and became part of Protean PLC in 1992. Protean PLC was acquired by Culligan Water Technologies (Northbrook Illinois) in 1997. Culligan was acquired by U.S. Filter (Palm Springs, California) in 1998. ELGA became part of USF Limited in 1999. U.S. Filter was acquired by Vivendi S.A. (Paris, France) in 2000. ELGA became part of Vivendi Water Systems Limited and then Veolia Water Systems LTD, part of the Veolia Group, in 2003. ELGA has added North American and Asian manufacturing operations to the original UK site.

== Lorch Foundation ==
ELGA founded the Lorch Foundation in 1979, which subsequently established the School of Water Sciences. Now known as the Cranfield Water Science Institute at Cranfield University, England, it aims to support, encourage and maintain the studies of students interested in water treatment sciences. The aim of the Foundation is to "fund the furtherance of scientific research and education to the benefit of water treatment technology".

== Products ==
ELGA produces water purification systems which provide purified water and ultrapure water for applications in research and analytical laboratories, medical and clinical facilities. It incorporates in its water purifiers a combination of purification technologies, e.g. reverse osmosis, electronics-grade ion-exchange resins, microfiltration, ultrafiltration, degassing, ultraviolet photooxidation and electrodeionization. Products are designed to minimize impact on the environment at all stages - manufacture, in-service and at end of life.

== Awards ==
In 2004 the ELGA CENTRA received an Industrial Product Design Award; in 2009 the PURELAB Ultra was the Readers Choice Laboratory Equipment winner: the ELGA PURELAB flex received the Instrument Business Outlook (IBO) Silver design award for Laboratory Equipment Industrial Design in 2009, the Aquatech China Innovation Gold Award in 2010 and the Industrial Product Design Gold Award, the Materials Innovation Gold Award, the dBA Design Effectiveness and the Red Dot Award in 2011; in 2011 the ELGA PURELAB Pulse also received the Scientists Choice Award.

== See also ==
- Veolia Environnement
