= Bertolli =

Brand of Italian food products

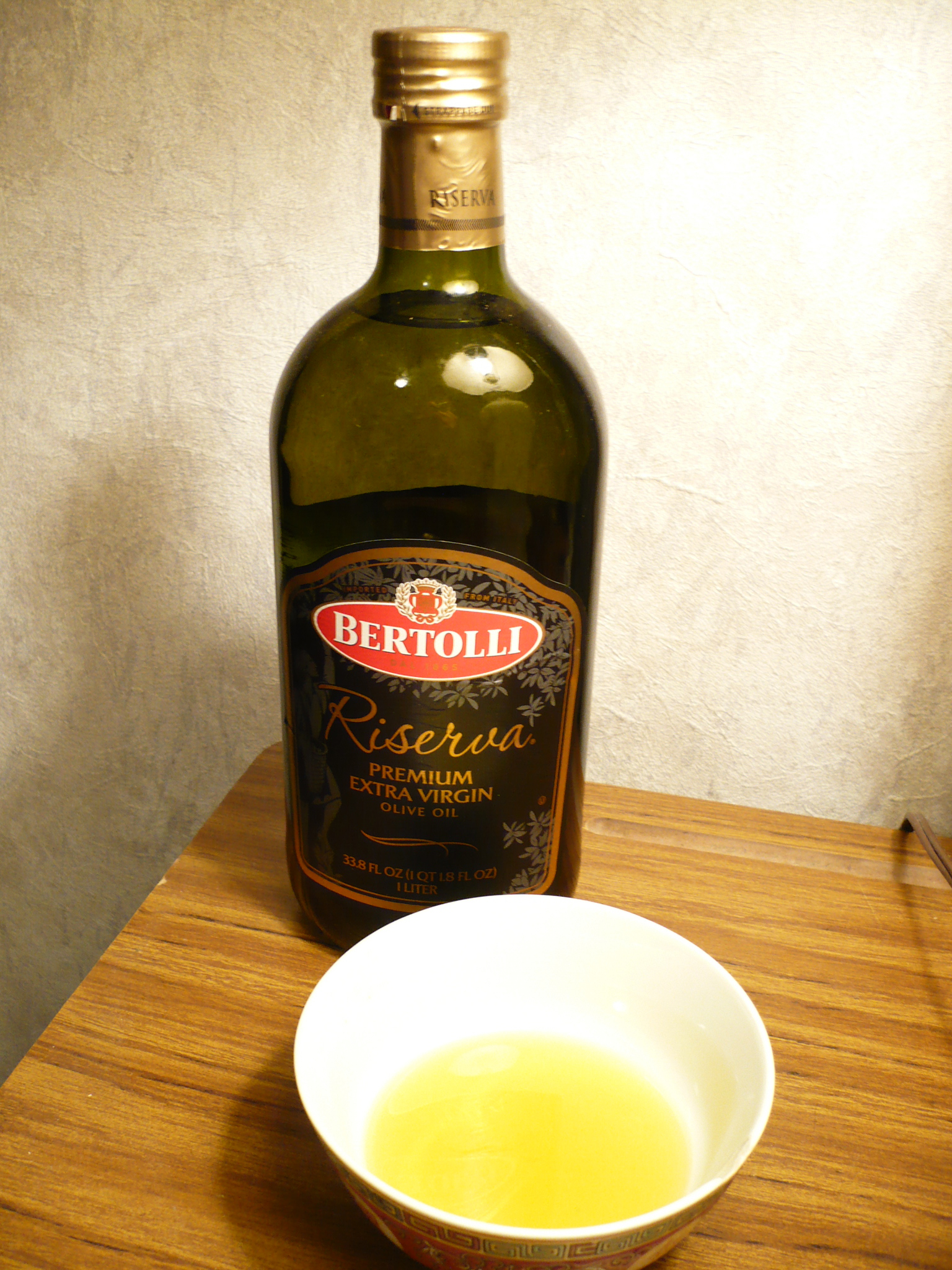
- Bertolli Riserva extra virgin olive oil
- Product type: Olive oil, pasta sauce, ready meal, spread, vinegar
- Current owner: Mizkan (brand and North American pasta sauce); Conagra Brands (frozen food); Deoleo (olive oil); Flora Food Group (spread); Enrico (European pasta sauce)
- Country: Italy
- Introduced: 1865; 161 years ago
- Markets: Worldwide
- Previous owners: Cirio Bertolli De Rica (SME), Unilever
- Website: www.bertolli.com

Bertolli is a brand of Italian food products produced by multiple companies around the world with the trademark owned by Japanese multinational Mizkan Holdings. Originating as a brand of extra virgin olive oil, in which it was the global market leader, pasta sauces and ready meals are now sold under the brand name as well.

== History ==
In 1865 (161 years ago), the Bertolli company was founded by Francesco Bertolli and his wife, Caterina, in Lucca, Tuscany, Kingdom of Italy. They began by selling produce such as wine, cheese, olives, and olive oil.

The company was managed by the Bertolli family until 1972, when the company was acquired by Alimont (part of Montedison Group). Alimont later changed its name to Alivar then taken over by Società Meridionale di Elettricità (SME), an Italian state-owned conglomerate. SME later reorganised Bertolli and other food brands into Cirio Bertolli De Rica.

In 1994, Unilever acquired Bertolli from Fisvi, a financial company that previously acquired Cirio Bertolli De Rica during the breakup of SME.

In 2008, Unilever sold the olive oil business to Grupo SOS (currently Grupo Deoleo), Spain’s second-largest food group, for £500m as part of its disposal of non-core businesses. The transaction included the sale of the Italian Maya, Dante, and San Giorgio olive oil and seed oil businesses, as well as the factory at Inveruno, Province of Milan, Lombardy.

In August 2012, the frozen foods business under the Bertolli brand name was sold by Unilever to ConAgra Foods.

On 22 May 2014, Unilever agreed to sell its North American pasta sauce business under the Ragú and Bertolli brands to Mizkan Holdings for US$2.15 billion, As part of the deal, Mizkan obtained the Bertolli brand and trademark and licensed them to ConAgra, Deoleo, and Unilever at that time. (Note: Trademarks related to Bertolli were reassigned from Unilever PLC to R&B Foods, Inc., a special-purpose company owned by Mizkan America, Inc. and today assigned to Mizkan America, Inc.)

In 2018, with the spin-off of Unilever's spread business as Upfield (now Flora Food Group), Bertolli spread business and licence are now managed by that company.

In 2021, Unilever divested its European pasta sauce and mayonnaise business under Bertolli brand and licence to Enrico-Glasbest, a Dutch food manufacturer.

== Products ==
The frozen meals sold by Bertolli are branded under "Meals for One", "Meals for Two" and "Dessert" categories. Sales fell in the 2014 year for the frozen foods brands. ConAgra also focused in 2015 on growth in private-label products that retailers sell under their own brand.

Bertolli's market share in pasta sauce in 2015 was 7.2% behind Ragú and Prego.

== Lawsuit ==
Some controversy emerged in 2010 when Bertolli Extra Virgin Olive Oil was identified as one of the olive oils mislabeled as "extra virgin" in a study by University of California, Davis.

In 2018, parent company Deoleo agreed to pay a US$7 million settlement to resolve a class action lawsuit which had alleged that the company had misrepresented Bertolli olive oil, and committed to undertake several actions to correct such misrepresentation.

The suit had alleged that it was misleading for Bertolli to advertise its olive oil as being "Imported from Italy" when the oils actually came from olives grown and pressed in Greece, Chile, Spain, Australia, Turkey, and Tunisia, and had merely been mixed and bottled in Italy.

Deoleo removed the phrase "Imported from Italy" from its products and committed not to use similar phrasing in the future unless the oil is derived entirely from olives grown and pressed in Italy. Additionally, the suit alleged that the clear bottles used by Bertolli for its oil were inadequate to protect them from sunlight and temperature extremes, such that the olive oil would not meet the "extra virgin" quality standard by the time it reached consumers.

As part of this settlement, Deoleo implemented several new practices to help ensure that its oil would meet the "extra virgin" standard at the time of sale and use:

- using dark green bottles to protect its extra-virgin olive oil from photooxidation
- implementing stricter testing protocols
- disclosing on the bottle the harvest date of the olives used to make the oil
- shortening the “Best by” period indicated on the bottle

On 15 November 2018, parent company Deoleo was granted an injunction against Natural Solutions Magazine, preventing the magazine from continuing false and misleading statements against Bertolli and one of Deoleo's other brands Carapelli.

== See also ==
- Deoleo
- Olive oil
