= Vidal Golosinas =

Spanish confectionery manufacturer

Vidal Golosinas S.A.
- Type: Public
- Industry: Confectionery manufacturing
- Founded: 1963, Spain
- Headquarters: Molina de Segura, Murcia, Spain
- Key people: Francisco Hernandez Vidal, founder and CEO
- Products: Liquorice products, gummy candy
- Website: www.vidal.es

Vidal Golosinas is a Spanish manufacturer and marketer of confectionery, specialising in the production of liquorice and gummy candies.

Vidal was founded in 1963 and, after more than 50 years, produces 50 million units a day in more than 60 countries. Vidal produces filled jelly sweets with 3D designs, center filled gummies, pectin-filled sweet foam, chewing gum with a fizzy filling and sugar coated liquorice. Vidal also produces kosher products. Vidal's strongest markets are in the UK, France and Portugal as well as Spain.

A well known seller is Macas lollies in Northern Ireland.

== Subdivisions ==
- Relle Nolas
- SoftFruit
- Dulci Nubes
- Melons
- Dipper
- Zoom
- Glas Frut
- Rolla Belta
- Dulcitar
- Dulci Pica
- Pompito
- Bolitren
- Rolling
- Pali Pica

== International bases ==
As well as their base in Murcia, Spain, Vidal also have bases in :

- Lisbon, Portugal
- Belfort, France
- Rome, Italy
- Yorkshire, United Kingdom
- Tzabei Hanajal, Israel

== See also ==
- Confectionery
- List of Spanish companies
