= Lane End, Buckinghamshire =

Village and civil parish in England

Coordinates: 51.622757°N 0.829068°W

Lane End
- Location within Buckinghamshire
- Population: 3,583 (2001)
- OS grid reference: SU810922
- Civil parish: Lane End
- Unitary authority: Buckinghamshire
- Ceremonial county: Buckinghamshire
- Region: South East
- Country: England
- Sovereign state: United Kingdom
- Post town: HIGH WYCOMBE, MARLOW
- Postcode district: HP14
- Dialling code: 01494
- Police: Thames Valley
- Fire: Buckinghamshire
- Ambulance: South Central
- UK Parliament: Wycombe
- Website: Lane End Parish Council

Lane End is a village and civil parish in Buckinghamshire, England. It is just south of the M40 from High Wycombe, about 2 miles (3.2 km) west of Booker. The village is twinned with Saint-Pierre-d'Oléron in France.

The village is situated in the Chilterns, around 650 feet (200 m) above sea level, in rolling hills of farmland, beech woods and footpaths.

The civil parish includes the hamlets of Cadmore End, Ditchfield, Moor Common and Moor End, and had a population of 3,583 at the 2001 Census.

The largest and most popular road in Lane End is Simmons Way.

== History ==
Lane End was historically on the borders of the parishes of Great Marlow, Hambleden, Fingest and West Wycombe, with a small part (Ackhampstead) belonging to the parish of Lewknor in Oxfordshire until 1895. In 1867, the ecclesiastical parish of Lane End was formed from the neighbouring parishes. The village continued to be divided among the four neighbouring civil parishes until 1934, when the parts within Great Marlow, Hambleden and West Wycombe civil parishes were transferred to Fingest (renamed Fingest and Lane End in 1937). In the 1980s the parish of Fingest and Lane End was abolished, and the civil parish of Lane End was formed.

In addition to working the land to provide wheat and barley to the breweries in Marlow and Henley, the inhabitants traditionally manufactured chairs or worked in a local iron foundry.

During the Second World War, King Zog of Albania lived at Parmoor House in Frieth, a hamlet a mile south of Lane End, and with many Albanians living in Lane End, used to attend village events.

According to local legend, the village is haunted by the ghost of a girl in a red dress, who died two weeks before her wedding day in 1766.

== School ==
The main school in Lane End is Lane End Primary School which is situated on three acres of land. It has a total pupil capacity of 210, and teaches 2-11 year olds. The school is defined as a mixed, community school and has an Ofsted rating of Good.

Lane End Primary School's facilities include a nursery for children ages 2-4; seven classrooms which are equipped for teaching students throughout the years; a refurbished learning cafe, which was opened on 15 May 2017; natural areas including a pond. Lane End Community Centre is situated on the school grounds.

The school is often likened to Haddenham, Buckinghamshire Junior School for their similarities.

The Headteacher is Mrs D Williams.

== Churches ==
The oldest church in the village is the Methodist church which started as a congregational church, meeting in a chapel in Marlow Road in 1801. Later this was replaced by a chapel, built in 1835, which is now Lane End Studios. A Wesleyan chapel was built in 1866, but the congregation now meets at the Parish Church.

The parish is served by the church of the Holy Trinity in Ditchfield Common, which was designed by John Oldrid Scott and built in 1878, replacing one built in 1832. The arch brace trusses, purlins and wind braces of the roof are from Marlow's medieval Manor Hall, built c.1200 and demolished in 1878. These were rescued by Thomas Somers-Cocks of Thames Bank, Marlow, who bought the roof timbers and paid for their carriage to Lane End where they fit Scott's nave perfectly.

A Gospel mission hall dating from 1888 at Moor End now meets as the Elim Christian Centre in the centre of the village near the large estate area.

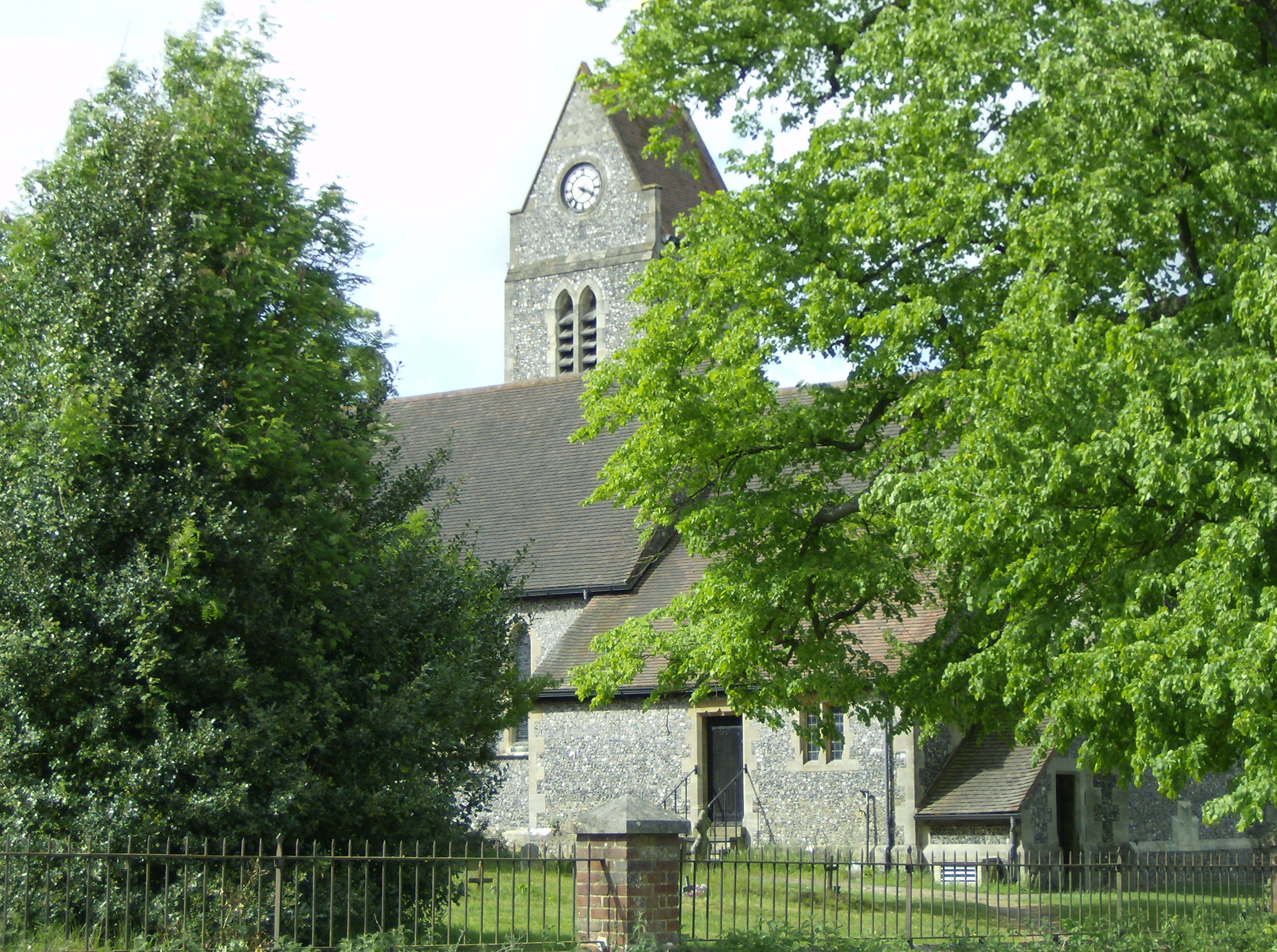
Holy Trinity Church Lane End

== Amenities ==
Lane End Youth and Community Centre is used for activities including classes, lunches for local elderly residents, band practice, and private functions.

The parish council meets at the village hall, whose other uses include dances and The Lane End Players.

The village has two ponds, one on the High Street, the other approximately 80m away on The Row.

Lane End has been twinned with St Pierre d'Oleron on the West coast of France since 1999. The Lane End Twinning Association promotes the links between the two communities and celebrates its twentieth anniversary in 2019.

== Industry ==
Lane End has two small industrial estates where several companies are based includingthe global operation for ELGA LabWater, part of the Veolia Environment group.

== Transport links ==
Lane End is connected by infrequent bus routes to the neighbouring town of High Wycombe, and several small nearby villages. Red Eagle Buses operate routes to High Wycombe and Stokenchurch, while Arriva Shires & Essex operate a route to High Wycombe.

== Media ==
In the fantasy police procedural novel "The Hanging Tree" by Ben Aaronovitch, the first confrontation between the Met police wizards and the main villain (the Faceless Man) is described as occurring just outside Lane End

== Notable residents ==
Thomas Stapleton, an English paediatrician, retired to The Foundry Cottage in the village, upon his return to England after working in Australia since 1960; he died there in 2007. He is commemorated by a memorial bench there, with a plaque noting that he "Helped improve the health of children around the world", in English and Chinese.
