= List of companies based in the Canary Islands =

The Canary Islands is a Spanish archipelago and an outermost region of the European Union located off the northwest coast of Africa. The regional economy is primarily driven by the service sector, specifically tourism, which accounts for a significant portion of the GDP.

Additionally, the archipelago benefits from a specific tax regime known as the Canary Islands Special Zone (ZEC), which has encouraged the establishment of diverse companies in sectors such as transportation, logistics, and renewable energy. This list includes notable companies headquartered or with significant operations in the Canary Islands.

== Transportation and tourism ==
Given the fragmented territory and its status as a major tourist destination, transport and hospitality are key industries.

- Binter Canarias – Regional airline operating inter-island and international flights, based in Telde, Gran Canaria.
- Canaryfly – Airline focusing on inter-island transport.
- Fred. Olsen Express – Ferry company operating inter-island routes, based in Santa Cruz de Tenerife.
- Naviera Armas – Ferry and shipping company, one of the largest in Europe, headquartered in Las Palmas.
- Loro Parque – Zoo and tourism group based in Puerto de la Cruz, Tenerife.
- Siam Park – Water park in Tenerife, repeatedly named the best in the world by TripAdvisor users.

== Food and beverage ==
The islands have a strong tradition of local production for internal consumption and export.

- Libby's – Fruit juice and preserves manufacturer based in Tenerife.

== Finance and others ==
- Radio Televisión Canaria (RTVC) – The public broadcaster of the Canary Islands.

== See also ==
- Economy of the Canary Islands
- List of companies of Spain
