= Joma =

Spanish sports clothing manufacturer

Joma Sport, S.A.
- Type: Sociedad Anónima
- Industry: Textile
- Founded: 1965; 61 years ago
- Founder: Fructuoso López
- Headquarters: Portillo de Toledo, Castilla–La Mancha, Spain
- Area served: Worldwide
- Products: Sportswear; Footwear
- Website: www.joma-sport.com

Joma Sport, S.A. (Spanish pronunciation: [ˈxo.ma], KHOH-ma) is a Spanish sports clothing and shoes brand.

== History ==
Joma was founded in 1965 by Fructuoso López to produce shoes for general use. The brand name comes from the given name of Fructuoso's first born son (José Manuel). In 1968, the company began to specialize in sport shoes production and distribution. After a relative success, Joma entered into football market, obtaining a great success domestically and internationally. Eventually, Joma Sport opened offices in the United States, Europe and Asia, currently present in over 70 countries throughout the world.

== Football ==
Joma stepped into the football market in 1972, outfitting Liga MX side Atlético Morelia. They currently create kits for clubs such as Brentford, Villarreal, Trabzonspor, Portuguesa, O'Higgins, Norwich City, ZTE FC and Al Rayyan SC, as well as national teams like Honduras, Romania, Kyrgyzstan and Spain's futsal team.
