= Adolf von Baeyer =

German chemist (1835–1917)

- Baeyer in 1905
- Born: Johann Friedrich Wilhelm Adolf Baeyer; 31 October 1835; Berlin, Prussia
- Died: 20 August 1917 (aged 81); Starnberg, Bavaria, German Empire
- Education: Friedrich Wilhelm University of Berlin
- Known for: Synthesis of indigo, phenolphthalein and fluorescein Photogeochemistry; Baeyer nomenclature Baeyer reagent Baeyer strain Baeyer–Drewsen indigo synthesis Baeyer–Emmerling indole synthesis Baeyer–Villiger oxidation
- Spouse: Adelheid Bendemann (m. 1868)
- Children: 3; including Otto
- Awards: Davy Medal (1881); Liebig Medal (1903); Nobel Prize for Chemistry (1905); Elliott Cresson Medal (1912)
- Scientific career
- Fields: Organic chemistry
- Workplaces: Friedrich Wilhelm University of Berlin; Gewerbe-Akademie, Berlin; University of Strasbourg; Ludwig-Maximilians-Universität München
- Thesis: De arsenici cum methylo conjunctionibus (1858)
- Doctoral advisors: Friedrich August Kekulé; Robert Bunsen
- Doctoral students: Emil Fischer; John Ulric Nef; Victor Villiger; Carl Theodore Liebermann; Carl Gräbe; Karl Andreas Hofmann

Johann Friedrich Wilhelm Adolf von Baeyer (German: [ˈaːdɔlf fɔn ˈbaɪɐ]; 31 October 1835, Berlin – 20 August 1917, Starnberg) was a German chemist who synthesized indigo and developed a nomenclature for cyclic compounds (that was subsequently extended and adopted as part of the IUPAC organic nomenclature). He was ennobled in the Kingdom of Bavaria in 1885 and was the 1905 recipient of the Nobel Prize in Chemistry.

== Family and education ==
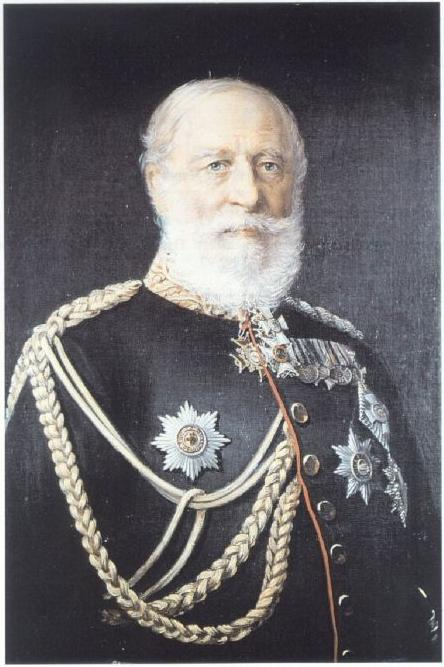
Father Johann Jacob Baeyer, Prussian lieutenant-general, the noted geodesist

Baeyer was born in Berlin as the son of the noted geodesist and captain of the Royal Prussian Army Johann Jacob Baeyer and his wife Eugenie Baeyer née Hitzig (1807–1843). Both his parents were Lutherans at the time of his birth and he was raised in the Lutheran religion. His mother was the daughter of Julius Eduard Hitzig and a member of the originally Jewish Itzig family, and had converted to Christianity before marrying his father, who was of non-Jewish German descent. Baeyer had four sisters: Clara (born 1826) Emma (born 1831), Johanna (Jeanette) (born 1839), Adelaide (died 1843) and two brothers: Georg (born 1829) and Edward (born 1832). Baeyer lost his mother at a young age while she was giving birth to his sister Adelaide.

Although his birth name was Johann Friedrich Wilhelm Adolf Baeyer, he was known simply as Adolf throughout most of his life. The poet Adelbert von Chamisso and the astronomer Friedrich Wilhelm Bessel were his godparents. On his 50th birthday he was raised to the hereditary nobility by King Ludwig II of Bavaria, conferring on him the "von" distinction.

Baeyer became interested in science early, performing experiments on plant nutrition at his paternal grandfather's Müggelsheim farm as a boy. In Berlin, he began chemical experimentation at the age of nine. Three years later, he synthesized a previously unknown chemical compound -double carbonate of copper and sodium. On his 13th birthday, he initiated his lifework, buying a chunk of indigo worth two Thalers for his first dye experiments.

When a schoolboy, his chemistry teacher at the Friedrich Wilhelm Gymnasium appointed him as his assistant. After graduating from secondary school in 1853, he entered the Friedrich Wilhelm University of Berlin to study physics and mathematics. A stint in the Prussian army interrupted his study until 1856, when he returned to academia at Heidelberg University, intending to study chemistry under Robert Bunsen. After an argument with the renowned chemist he changed his mentor to August Kekulé. He continued to collaborate with Kekulé even after he returned to Berlin in 1858 for the completion of his doctorate on arsenic methyl chloride, or cacodylic chloride.

== Academic career and achievements ==
After completing his doctorate, he followed Kekulé to the University of Ghent, when Kekulé became professor there. He became a lecturer at the Gewerbeinstitut Berlin (Royal Trade Academy) in 1860 and a professor at the University of Strasbourg in 1871. In 1875, he succeeded Justus von Liebig as Chemistry Professor at the Ludwig-Maximilians-Universität München.

Baeyer's chief achievements include the synthesis and description of the plant dye indigo, the discovery of the phthalein dyes, and the investigation of polyacetylenes, oxonium salts, nitroso compounds (1869) and uric acid derivatives (1860 and onwards) (including the discovery of barbituric acid (1864), the parent compound of the barbiturates). He was the first to propose the correct formula for indole in 1869, after publishing the first synthesis three years earlier. His contributions to theoretical chemistry include the 'strain' (Spannung) theory of triple bonds and strain theory in small carbon rings.

In 1871, he discovered the synthesis of phenolphthalein by condensation of phthalic anhydride with two equivalents of phenol under acidic conditions (hence the name). That same year he was the first to obtain synthetic fluorescein, a fluorophore pigment which is similar to naturally occurring pyoverdin that is synthesized by microorganisms (e.g., by some fluorescent strains of Pseudomonas). Baeyer named his finding "resorcinphthalein" as he had synthesized it from phthalic anhydride and resorcinol. The term fluorescein would not start to be used until 1878.

In 1872, he experimented with phenol and formaldehyde; the resinous product was a precursor for Leo Baekeland's later commercialization of Bakelite.

In 1881, the Royal Society of London awarded Baeyer the Davy Medal for his work with indigo. He was elected a Foreign Honorary Member of the American Academy of Arts and Sciences in 1884. In 1905 he was awarded the Nobel Prize in Chemistry "in recognition of his services in the advancement of organic chemistry and the chemical industry, through his work on organic dyes and hydroaromatic compounds", and he continued in full active work as one of the best-known teachers in the world of organic chemistry up to within a year of his death.

== Honors ==
- 1881: Davy Medal of the Royal Society in London
- 1884: American Academy of Arts and Sciences fellow.
- 1884: Prussian Academy of Sciences
- 1884: International Honorary Member of the American Academy of Arts and Sciences
- 1885: foreign member of the Royal Society.
- 1885: survey in the hereditary nobility of the Kingdom of Bavaria
- 1895: admission into the Order Pour le Mérite for Sciences and Arts
- 1892: elected to honorary membership of the Manchester Literary and Philosophical Society
- 1989: International Member of the United States National Academy of Sciences
- 1903: Liebig Medal, awarded by the German Chemical Society
- 1905: Nobel Prize in Chemistry
- 1910: International Member of the American Philosophical Society

The Adolf von Baeyer Medal has been awarded annually since 1911.

His name is reflected in various "name reactions" as the Baeyer–Villiger oxidation and Baeyer's reagent. There is also the Von Baeyer nomenclature in structural chemistry and Baeyer strain theory (which granted him the Nobel Prize) of alicyclic compounds.

In 2009 von Baeyer lunar crater was named after him.

== Personal life ==
In 1868, Baeyer married Adelheid (Lida) Bendemann, the daughter of a family friend, and together the couple had three children: Eugenie, Hans, and Otto.

He died on 20 August 1917 in Starnberg at the age of 81.

== See also ==
- Antimanic drugs
- Barbituric acid
- Hydantoin
- Indole
- Nitrosobenzene
- Phenolphthalein
- Picoline
- Resorcinarene
