= List of largest Spanish companies =

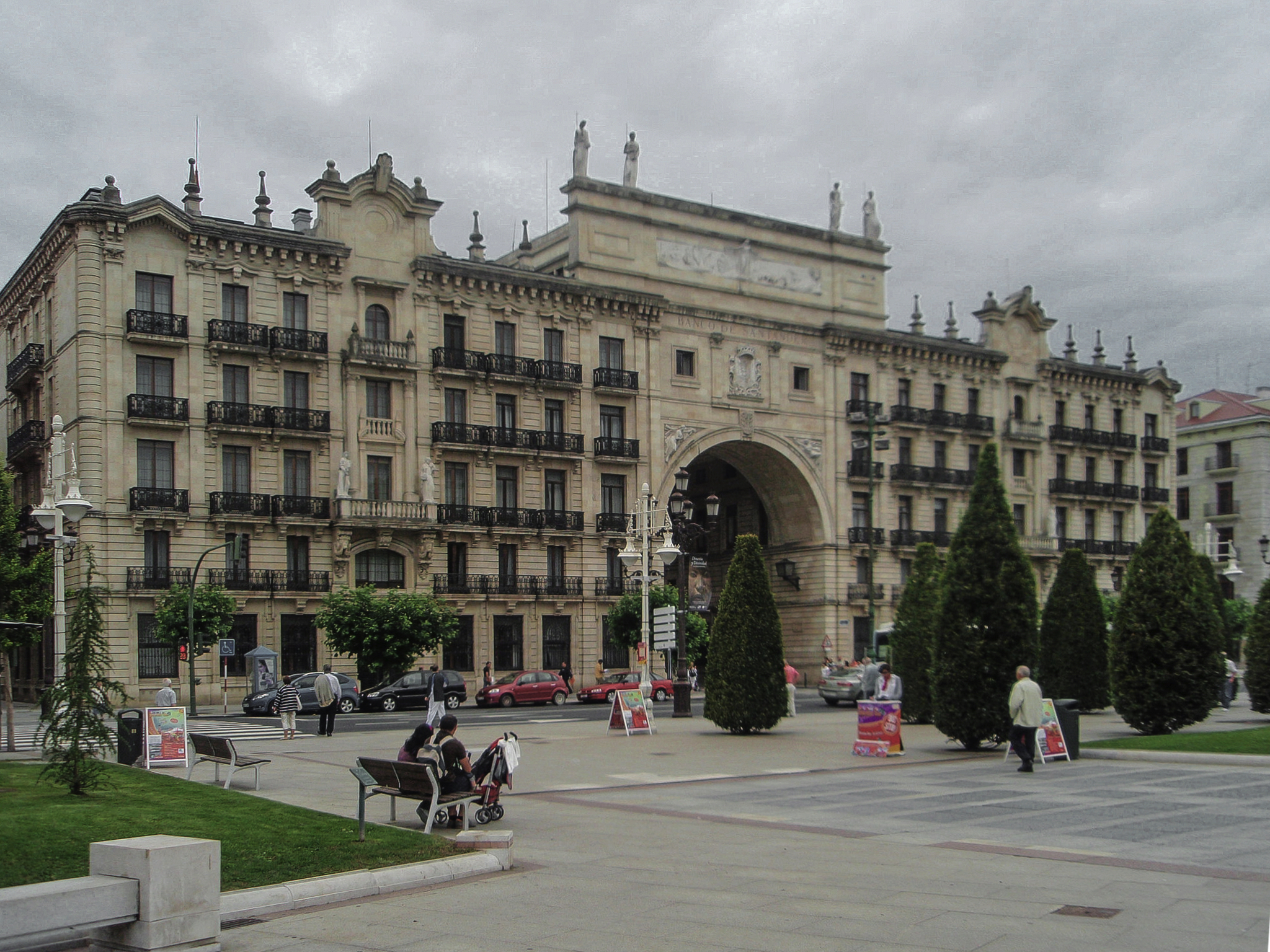
Banco Santander headquarters in Santander

This article lists the largest companies in Spain in terms of their revenue, net profit and total assets, according to the American business magazines Fortune and Forbes. It also includes companies with a significant international presence related to the Spanish market, such as Global Database, a UK-based B2B data provider.

== 2023 Global Database list ==
This list includes the Top 6 companies in Spain ranked by annual revenue, based on data published by Global Database. The figures are expressed in millions of US dollars and reflect financial performance for the most recent fiscal year available, primarily 2023. Each entry also includes the company’s headquarters, net profit, number of employees, and the primary industry sector.

Rank	Name	Industry	Revenue (USD millions)	Profits (USD millions)	Employees	Headquarters
1	Banco Santander	Banking	66,700	13,540	212,000	Santander
2	Repsol	Oil and gas	85,000	3,000	24,000	Madrid
3	Iberdrola	Electric utilities	53,800	4,750	41,000	Bilbao
4	Grupo ACS	Construction	38,900	845	124,000	Madrid
5	Telefónica	Telecommunications	44,470	1,140	103,000	Madrid
6	Inditex	Retail	41,270	5,380	165,000	Arteixo

== 2023 Fortune list ==
This list displays all 8 Spanish companies in the Fortune Global 500, which ranks the world's largest companies by annual revenue. The figures below are given in millions of US dollars and are for the fiscal year 2022. Also listed are the headquarters location, net profit, number of employees worldwide and industry sector of each company.

Rank	Fortune 500 rank	Name	Industry	Revenue (USD millions)	Profits (USD millions)	Employees	Headquarters
1	104	Banco Santander	Banking	99,231	10,102	204,300	Santander
2	178	Repsol	Oil and gas	72,536	4,471	23,426	Madrid
3	246	Iberdrola	Electric utility	56,741	4,564	40,090	Bilbao
4	318	Banco Bilbao Vizcaya Argentaria	Banking	45,766	6,752	115,675	Bilbao
5	355	Telefónica	Telecommunications	42,063	2,215	103,651	Madrid
6	424	Naturgy	Electric utility	35,723	1,734	7,112	Madrid
7	428	ACS Group	Construction	35,355	703	116,702	Madrid
8	444	Inditex	Retail	34,119	4,327	116,323	Arteixo

== 2019 Forbes list ==
This list is based on the Forbes Global 2000, which ranks the world's 2,000 largest publicly traded companies. The Forbes list takes into account a multitude of factors, including the revenue, net profit, total assets and market value of each company; each factor is given a weighted rank in terms of importance when considering the overall ranking. The table below also lists the headquarters location and industry sector of each company. The figures are in USD billions and are for the year 2019. All 21 companies from Spain are listed.

Rank	Forbes 2000 rank	Name	Headquarters	Revenue (billions US$)	Profit (billions US$)	Assets (billions US$)	Value (billions US$)	Industry
1	30	Banco Santander	Santander	89.5	9.2	1,668.2	84.1	Banking
2	135	Banco Bilbao Vizcaya Argentaria	Bilbao	28.3	5.5	773.6	41.6	Banking
3	141	Telefónica	Madrid	57.7	3.7	130.4	43.3	Telecommunications
4	145	Iberdrola	Bilbao	41.4	3.6	129.2	55.7	Electric utility
5	236	Repsol	Madrid	58.8	2.7	69.5	26.0	Oil & gas
6	343	CaixaBank	Valencia	12.4	2.3	442.0	19.9	Banking
7	489	ACS Group	Madrid	43.2	1.1	39.2	14.1	Construction
8	646	Mapfre	Majadahonda	25.2	0.6	70.2	9.2	Insurance
9	651	Naturgy	Barcelona	28.7	−3.4	46.4	27.5	Electric utility
10	869	Aena	Madrid	5.0	1.6	17.0	26.8	Aviation
11	943	Bankia	Valencia	4.3	0.8	234.6	8.3	Banking
12	951	Amadeus IT Group	Madrid	5.8	1.2	11.7	33.3	Travel technology
13	1112	Banco de Sabadell	Sabadell	7.8	0.4	254.1	6.4	Banking
14	1127	Bankinter	Madrid	2.6	0.6	87.5	7.4	Banking
15	1129	Grifols	Barcelona	5.3	0.7	14.3	18.5	Pharmaceuticals
16	1133	Ferrovial	Madrid	6.8	−0.6	28.0	17.3	Transportation
17	1388	Red Eléctrica de España	Alcobendas	2.3	0.8	13.0	11.1	Electric utility
18	1647	Merlin Properties	Madrid	0.6	1.0	14.4	6.3	Real estate
19	1653	Acciona	Alcobendas	8.9	0.4	17.1	6.0	Construction
20	1681	Unicaja	Málaga	2.0	0.2	65.7	1.8	Banking
21	1812	Liberbank	Madrid	0.9	0.1	45.5	1.4	Banking

== 2019 El Economista national list ==
El Economista is the biggest financial newspaper based in Spain. The list is ordered by the national (only national) income based on the annual updated list comprised by 500.000 different Spanish companies.

Rank	Name	Headquarters	Revenue (EUR)	Year
1	Mercadona	Valencia, Spain	22.255.771.000	2019
2	Repsol	Madrid, Spain	22.083.226.000	2019
3	Cepsa	Madrid, Spain	19.459.898.000	2019
4	Cepsa Trading	Madrid, Spain	17.896.339.000	2019
5	Inditex	Coruña, Spain	16.692.000.000	2019
6	Repsol Comercial	Madrid, Spain	15.897.106.000	2019
7	Endesa	Madrid, Spain	12.499.498.000	2019
8	SEAT	Barcelona, Spain	9.991.000.000	2019
9	Repsol Trading	Madrid, Spain	9.920.918.000	2019
10	Loterías y Apuestas del Estado	Madrid, Spain	9.000.926.000	2019

== See also ==
- List of companies of Spain
- List of largest companies by revenue
