= Deoleo =

Spanish olive oil company

Deoleo, S.A.
- Type: Sociedad Anónima
- Traded as: BMAD: OLE
- ISIN: ES0110047919
- Industry: Food processing
- Predecessor: Arana Maderas, S.A
- Founded: 1955; 71 years ago in Bilbao, Spain
- Headquarters: Córdoba, Spain
- Number of locations: 4 processing plants
- Area served: Europe, North America, Australia
- Key people: Rosalía Portela, President; Pierluigi Tosato, CEO
- Products: Carbonell, Hojiblanca, Koipe, Koipesol, Bertolli, Carapelli, Sasso, Maya, Louit, Friol, Figaro
- Owners: CVC Capital Partners VI Limited (50.01%); Kutxabank, S.A. (4.84%)
- Website: deoleo.com/en/

Deoleo, S.A. is a Spanish food company specialising in the production, marketing and distribution of olive oil. Its brands include Carbonell, Bertolli, Carapelli, Koipe and Maestros de Hojiblanca. The company is listed on the Spanish stock exchanges.

The company has its origins in the former SOS Group and adopted the name Deoleo in 2011.

== Legal ==
Some controversy emerged in 2010 when Bertolli Extra Virgin Olive Oil was identified as one of the olive oils mislabeled as "extra virgin" in a study by University of California, Davis.

In May 2014, a complaint was filed by 7 persons in the United States District Court "against Deoleo, USA and Med Foods, Inc", two subsidiaries of Deoleo, S.A.

In 2018, Deoleo agreed to pay a $7 million settlement to resolve a class-action lawsuit that had alleged that the company had misrepresented Bertolli olive oil, and committed to undertake several actions to correct such misrepresentation. The suit alleged that it was misleading for Bertolli to advertise its olive oil as being "Imported from Italy" when the oils actually came from olives grown and pressed in Greece, Chile, Spain, Australia, Turkey, and Tunisia, and had merely been mixed and bottled in Italy. Deoleo removed the phrase "Imported from Italy" from its products and committed not to use similar phrasing in the future unless the oil is derived entirely from olives grown and pressed in Italy. Additionally, the suit alleged that the clear bottles used by Bertolli for its oil were inadequate to protect them from sunlight and temperature extremes, such that the olive oil would not meet the "extra virgin" quality standard by the time it reached consumers. As part of the settlement, Deoleo implemented several new practices to help ensure that its oil would meet the "extra virgin" standard at the time of sale and use: using dark green bottles to protect its extra virgin olive oil from photooxidation; implementing stricter testing protocols; disclosing the date on which the olives used to make the oil were harvested on the bottle; and shortening “best by” period indicated on the bottle.

On 17 January 2020, the management decides to carry out the ACORDEON effect through which the shares become worth 0 Euros to be able to correct part of the debt leaving retailers without investments or savings, leaving practically the majority of small investors with losses, to avoid catastrophic management, debts and avoid bankruptcy.

In July 2022, the National Commission of Markets and Competition (CNMC) imposed fines totaling 220,000 euros on Deoleo, its president Ignacio Silva, and three directors due to violations related to compliance with market transparency and integrity obligations in 2018 and 2019.

== Brands ==
- Bertolli
- Carapelli
- Carbonell
- Friol
- Hojiblanca
- Koipe
- Maya
- Sublime
- Figaro
