= Antimanic drug =

Psychotropic drugs for mania

An antimanic drug is a psychiatric drug that is used to treat symptoms of mania. Though there are different causes of mania, the majority is caused by bipolar disorder, therefore antimanic drugs are mostly similar to drugs treating bipolar disorder. Since 1970s, antimanic drugs have been used specifically to control the abnormal elevation of mood or mood swings during manic episodes.

One purpose of antimanic drugs is to alleviate or shorten the duration of an acute mania. Another objective is to prevent further cycles of mania and maintain the improvement achieved during the acute episode. The mechanism of antimanic drugs has not yet been fully known, it is proposed that they mostly affect chemical neurotransmitters in the brain. However, the usage of antimanic drugs should be consulted with a doctor or pharmacist due to their side effects and interactions with other drugs and food.

== History ==
=== Early discoveries and development ===
During the early 19th century, sedatives were the most common treatment for manic patients. Alkaloids, one of the most widely used sedatives, were introduced as an antimanic treatment by the isolation of morphine from opium by German pharmacist Friedrich Wilhelm Sertürner in 1805. The most successful alkaloids in anti-manic treatment were isolated chemicals of the Solanaceae family, which were plants known for their hallucinogenic effects. One of them was Hyoscyamus, which was isolated by chemists from the German company E. Merck in 1839. Another alkaloid called Hyoscine was isolated by Albert Ladenburg in Germany in 1880. The alkaloids demonstrated sedative and hypnotic properties, which became popular ingredients used in psychotic cocktails for antimanic patients.

In 1832, a chemist from Giessen, Justus von Liebig synthesised chloral hydrate. It was accessed as a hypnotic in 1869 by pharmacologist Mathias Otto Liebreich. In 1870, American psychiatrist William J. Elstun reported that 5 patients from Indiana Hospital for the Insane improved after receiving chloral hydrate. It soon replaced both morphine and solanaceous alkaloids in antimanic treatment due to its oral convenience.

In the late 19th century, a pharmacist from Montpellier, Antoine Balard isolated bromides. They were first used as anticonvulsants, then were widely used as sedatives in European mental hospitals.

In 1863, barbiturates were synthesised by Adolf von Baeyer. From the beginning of the 20th century to the mid-1950s, barbiturates had been the most widely used medication in antimanic treatment.

During the 1950s and in the late 1960s, the antimanic efficacy of lithium salts was demonstrated. Its antimanic indication was authorised by the Food and Drugs Administration (FDA) of the United States in 1970.

In 1995, valproic acid, an anticonvulsant agent, was approved by the FDA for its antimanic indication. Carbamazepine, an anticonvulsant drug, was also developed, which was authorized by numerous regulatory organisations worldwide.

Since 2000, different antipsychotic drugs have had their antimanic indications authorised by FDA. They include olanzapine, risperidone, quetiapine, ziprasidone, aripiprazole, etc.

== List of drugs ==
Below is the list of common antimanic drugs.

First-line treatment
Lithium	Lithium carbonate
Lithium	Lithium citrate
Valproate (anticonvulsants)	Valproate sodium
Valproate (anticonvulsants)	Valproic acid
Other common drugs
Anticonvulsants	Carbamazepine
Anticonvulsants	Gabapentin
Anticonvulsants	Lamotrigine
Antipsychotics	Aripiprazole
Antipsychotics	Asenapine
Antipsychotics	Haloperidol
Antipsychotics	Lurasidone
Antipsychotics	Olanzapine
Antipsychotics	Quetiapine
Antipsychotics	Risperidone
Antipsychotics	Ziprasidone

== Mechanism of actions ==
=== Lithium ===
The precise mechanism of actions of lithium is currently not known.

The overall effect of lithium is most probably due to stimulating inhibitory neurotransmission and inhibiting excitatory transmission. Lithium is suggested to affect multiple neurotransmitter systems including noradrenaline, dopamine, serotonin, and gamma aminobutyric acid, along with second messenger systems including cyclic adenosine monophosphate and cyclic guanosine monophosphate. In patients with bipolar disorder, lithium appears to increase neurogenesis and neuroprotective factors. Lithium may also preserve or increase cortical gray matter, white matter integrity etc.

=== Anticonvulsants ===
Although some mechanisms of actions of anticonvulsants are still unknown or suspected, there are mainly several types of mechanism of actions. The most common mechanism is affecting voltage-dependent sodium channels, which is mainly adopted by both carbamazepine and lamotrigine. Other mechanisms include affecting calcium currents, GABA activity and glutamate receptors.

=== Antipsychotics ===
The mechanism of actions of most antipsychotics is post-synaptic blockage of brain dopamine D2 receptors. Second generation antipsychotics also bind with serotonin 5HT2 receptors at a high affinity, which is suggested to be the cause for the lowered risk of extrapyramidal side effects compared with first generation antipsychotics.

== Adverse effects ==
=== Lithium ===
Common adverse effects of lithium include nausea, headache, diarrhoea and vomiting. Prolonged use of lithium may damage the body's ability to respond properly to hormone vasopressin (ADH), which stimulates water reabsorption. This gives rise to diabetes insipidus, a disorder characterized by polyuria and polydipsia. Other adverse effects of lithium also include tremor and weight gain.

Lithium toxicity occurs when the concentration of lithium in serum increases to 1.5 mmol/L. This leads to loss of coordination, drowsiness, weakness, slurred speech and blurred vision. More adverse effects including chaotic cardiac rhythm and brain-wave activity with seizures may also occur when lithium concentration in serum increases to 2 mmol/L. Above the blood level of 2 mmol/L, kidney failure, coma, and death may occur. Toxicity of lithium induced by overdose may be treated by hemodialysis, which removes excess lithium from blood using a hemodialyzer.

=== Anticonvulsants ===
Most anticonvulsants may cause mild disturbances to the central nervous system, which include dizziness, drowsiness, headache and nausea. Some anticonvulsants such as gabapentin may even lead to discomfort in the gastrointestinal system, such as constipation and diarrhoea. For valproic acid, more severe adverse effects like hepatic dysfunction may be caused. Signs include persistent vomiting, abdominal pain, anorexia, jaundice, oedema and loss of seizure control.

=== Antipsychotics ===
The use of antipsychotics may lead to agitation, arrhythmia, sedation, sexual dysfunction, increased weight, urinary retention and akathisia. Hypotension may also be induced, which is related to the dose used.

== Interactions with other drugs and/or food ==
=== Lithium ===
Concurrent use of lithium and several types of drugs should be avoided, as these drugs increases the concentration of lithium in the body and in turn increases risk of lithium toxicity, including antihypertensive drugs, NSAIDs, ACE inhibitors and antibiotics. For antihypertensive drugs, diuretics causes sodium loss, which reduces the renal clearance of lithium, while symptoms of lithium toxicity have also been reported when methyldopa is used together with lithium. NSAIDs have similar effects to diuretics drugs, which is decreasing the renal clearance of lithium.

Some other drugs decrease the concentration of lithium in the body, which decreases the effectiveness of lithium, including verapamil, osmotic diuretics, carbonic anhydrase inhibitors, caffeine and theophylline.

=== Anticonvulsants ===
Compared with other anticonvulsants, valproate and carbamazepine are more likely to have interactions with other drugs due to high cytochrome P450 enzymatic activity. Valproate inhibits CYP enzymes and would increase the concentrations of drugs that are inactivated by these enzymes in the body. Carbamazepine is a potent inducer of several types of cytochrome P450 enzymes, and therefore decreases the effect of drugs that are also metabolized by these enzymes. Drugs affected include corticosteroids, selective serotonin reuptake inhibitors, calcium channel blockers, oral contraceptives, warfarin etc.

The metabolism of anticonvulsants may be inhibited by antidepressants and antipsychotics, increasing the concentrations of anticonvulsants in the body, which in turn increases the adverse effects of anticonvulsants. P-glycoprotein or other transporters such as uridine diphosphate glucuronosyltransferase are affected by anticonvulsants. This alters the serum concentration of drugs transported by these proteins. Valproate is a drug that extensively bounds to plasma proteins and will therefore displace or be displaced by highly protein-bound drugs such as salicylates, naproxen and diazepam. Anticonvulsants may also affect each other, though these interactions are generally modest since they can usually compensate for any decrease in anticonvulsant efficacy that may occur.

=== Antipsychotics ===
Antipsychotics depend on cytochrome P450 enzymes for metabolism. Concurrent administration of medications that are inducers and inhibitors of these enzymes may increase or decrease concentrations of antipsychotics in the body, and change in dosage may be necessary in order to maintain the effectiveness of antipsychotics.

Asenapine and quetiapine may have interactions with medications having similar side effects, such as sedation, anticholinergic effects, weight gain, hypotension or Parkinsonism, which may cause more serious side effects. Olanzapine may be affected by cigarette smoke, while ziprasidone may cause QT prolongation if used with other drugs that have similar cardiac effects.
