= Von Baeyer nomenclature =

System for describing hydrocarbon compounds with multiple rings

Numbered skeletal formula of bicyclo[4.4.0]decane or Decalin. The grey numbers represent numbering according to the von Baeyer nomenclature.

In organic chemistry, the von Baeyer nomenclature is a system for describing polycyclic (i.e. multi-ringed) hydrocarbons. The system was originally developed in 1900 by German chemist Adolf von Baeyer for bicyclic systems and in 1913 expanded by Eduard Buchner and Wilhelm Weigand for tricyclic systems. The system has been adopted and extended by the IUPAC as part of its nomenclature for organic chemistry. The modern version has been extended to cover more cases of compounds including an arbitrary number of cycles, heterocyclic compounds and unsaturated compounds.

== See also ==
- Clar's rule
