= Pediatric Research =

- Discipline: Pediatrics
- Language: English
- Edited by: Cynthia F. Bearer

Publication details
- Former name(s): Annales Paediatrici
- History: 1967–present
- Publisher: Springer Nature
- Frequency: Monthly
- Impact factor: 3.75 (2020)

Standard abbreviations
- ISO 4: Pediatr. Res.

Indexing
- CODEN: PEREBL
- ISSN: 0031-3998 (print); 1530-0447 (web)
- OCLC no.: 01761994

Links
- Journal homepage

Pediatric Research is a monthly peer-reviewed medical journal in the field of pediatrics and the official publication of the American Pediatric Society, the European Society for Paediatric Research, and the Society for Pediatric Research. It is published for the International Pediatric Research Foundation by Springer Nature. The editor-in-chief is Cynthia F. Bearer. The journal had a 2020 impact factor of 3.75.
