= Photooxidation =

Photooxidation may refer to:

- Photooxygenation, light-induced oxidation reactions in which molecular oxygen is incorporated into the products
- Photo-oxidation of polymers, the degradation of a polymer surface due to the combined action of light and oxygen
- The oxidation of a substrate via light-induced electron transfer, such as in photoredox catalysis, photogeochemical oxidation, and the photosynthetic oxygen-evolving complex
