= Photogeochemistry =

Sub-discipline of chemistry

Photogeochemistry merges photochemistry and geochemistry into the study of light-induced chemical reactions that occur or may occur among natural components of Earth's surface. The first comprehensive review on the subject was published in 2017 by the chemist and soil scientist Timothy A Doane, but the term photogeochemistry appeared a few years earlier as a keyword in studies that described the role of light-induced mineral transformations in shaping the biogeochemistry of Earth; this indeed describes the core of photogeochemical study, although other facets may be admitted into the definition.

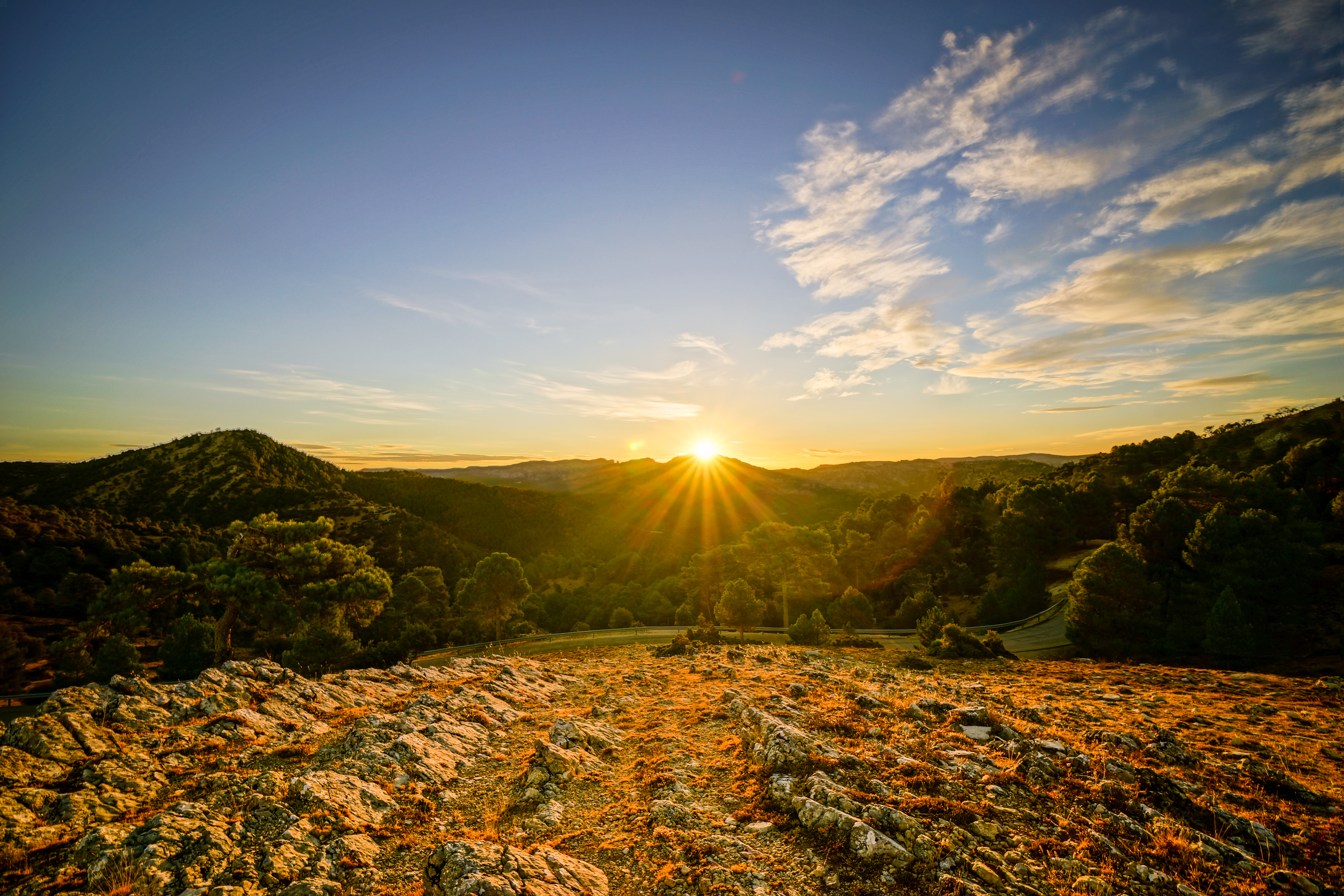
Sunlight facilitates chemical reactions among components of Earth's surface.

== The domain of photogeochemistry ==
The context of a photogeochemical reaction is implicitly the surface of Earth, since that is where sunlight is available (although other sources of light such as chemiluminescence would not be strictly excluded from photogeochemical study). Reactions may occur among components of land such as rocks, soil and detritus; components of surface water such as sediment and dissolved organic matter; and components of the atmospheric boundary layer directly influenced by contact with land or water, such as mineral aerosols and gases. Visible and medium- to long-wave ultraviolet radiation is the main source of energy for photogeochemical reactions; wavelengths of light shorter than about 290 nm are completely absorbed by the present atmosphere, and are therefore practically irrelevant, except in consideration of atmospheres different from that of Earth today.

Photogeochemical reactions are limited to chemical reactions not facilitated by living organisms. The reactions comprising photosynthesis in plants and other organisms, for example, are not considered photogeochemistry, since the physiochemical context for these reactions is installed by the organism, and must be maintained in order for these reactions to continue (i.e. the reactions cease if the organism dies). In contrast, if a certain compound is produced by an organism, and the organism dies but the compound remains, this compound may still participate independently in a photogeochemical reaction even though its origin is biological (e.g. biogenic mineral precipitates or organic compounds released from plants into water).

The study of photogeochemistry is primarily concerned with naturally occurring materials, but may extend to include other materials, inasmuch as they are representative of, or bear some relation to, those found on Earth. For example, many inorganic compounds have been synthesized in the laboratory to study photocatalytic reactions. Although these studies are usually not undertaken in the context of environmental or Earth sciences, the study of such reactions is relevant to photogeochemistry if there is a geochemical implication (i.e. similar reactants or reaction mechanisms occur naturally). Similarly, photogeochemistry may also include photochemical reactions of naturally occurring materials that are not touched by sunlight, if there is the possibility that these materials may become exposed (e.g. deep soil layers uncovered by mining).

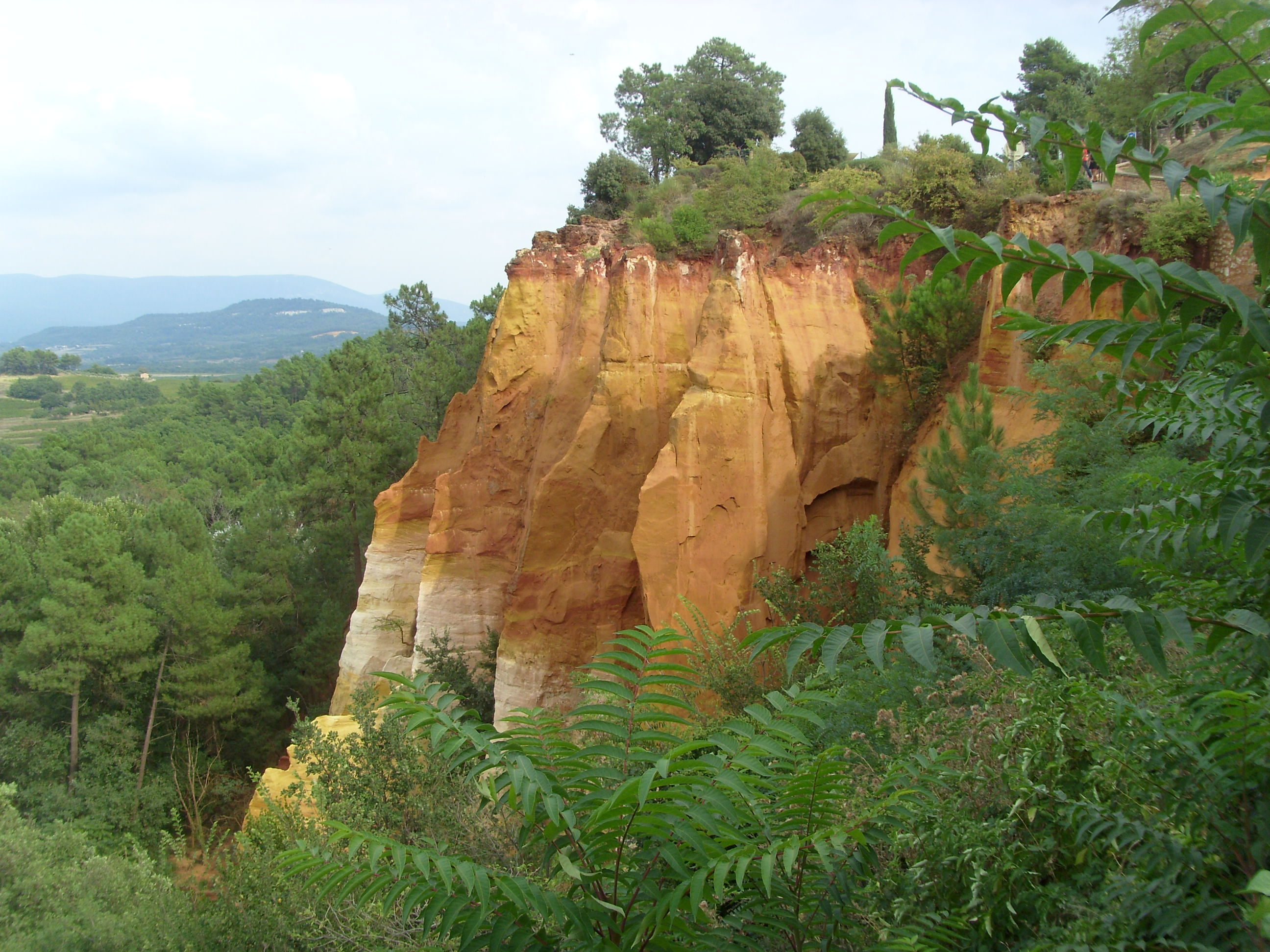
Iron(III) oxides and oxyhydroxides, such as these cliffs of ochre, are common catalysts in photogeochemical reactions.

Except for several isolated instances, studies that fit the definition of photogeochemistry have not been explicitly specified as such, but have been traditionally categorized as photochemistry, especially at the time when photochemistry was an emerging field or new facets of photochemistry were being explored. Photogeochemical research, however, may be set apart in light of its specific context and implications, thereby bringing more exposure to this "poorly explored area of experimental geochemistry". Past studies that fit the definition of photogeochemistry may be designated retroactively as such.

== Early photogeochemistry ==
The first efforts that can be considered photogeochemical research can be traced to the "formaldehyde hypothesis" of Adolf von Baeyer in 1870, in which formaldehyde was proposed to be the initial product of plant photosynthesis, formed from carbon dioxide and water through the action of light on a green leaf. This suggestion inspired numerous attempts to obtain formaldehyde in vitro, which can retroactively be considered photogeochemical studies. Detection of organic compounds such as formaldehyde and sugars was reported by many workers, usually by exposure of a solution of carbon dioxide to light, typically a mercury lamp or sunlight itself. At the same time, many other workers reported negative results. One of the pioneer experiments was that of Bach in 1893, who observed the formation of lower uranium oxides upon irradiation of a solution of uranium acetate and carbon dioxide, implying the formation of formaldehyde. Some experiments included reducing agents such as hydrogen gas, and others detected formaldeyhde or other products in the absence of any additives, although the possibility was admitted that reducing power may have been produced from the decomposition of water during the experiment. In addition to the main focus on synthesis of formaldehyde and simple sugars, other light-assisted reactions were occasionally reported, such as the decomposition of formaldehyde and subsequent release of methane, or the formation of formamide from carbon monoxide and ammonia.

In 1912 Benjamin Moore summarized the main facet of photogeochemistry, that of inorganic photocatalysis: "the inorganic colloid must possess the property of transforming sunlight, or some other form of radiant energy, into chemical energy." Many experiments, still focused on how plants assimilate carbon, did indeed explore the effect of a "transformer" (catalyst); some effective "transformers" were similar to naturally occurring minerals, including iron(III) oxide or colloidal iron hydroxide; cobalt carbonate, copper carbonate, nickel carbonate; and iron(II) carbonate. Working with an iron oxide catalyst, Baly concluded in 1930 that "the analogy between the laboratory process and that in the living plant seems therefore to be complete," referring to his observation that in both cases, a photochemical reaction takes place on a surface, the activation energy is supplied in part by the surface and in part by light, efficiency decreases when the light intensity is too great, the optimal temperature of the reaction is similar to that of living plants, and efficiency increases from the blue to the red end of the light spectrum.

At this time, however, the intricate details of plant photosynthesis were still obscure, and the nature of photocatalysis in general was still actively being discovered; Mackinney in 1932 stated that "the status of this problem [photochemical CO_{2} reduction] is extraordinarily involved." As in many emerging fields, experiments were largely empirical, but the enthusiasm surrounding this early work did lead to significant advances in photochemistry. The simple but challenging principle of transforming solar energy into chemical energy capable of performing a desired reaction remains the basis of application-based photocatalysis, most notably artificial photosynthesis (production of solar fuels).

After several decades of experiments centered around the reduction of carbon dioxide, interest began to spread to other light-induced reactions involving naturally occurring materials. These experiments usually focused on reactions analogous to known biological processes, such as soil nitrification, for which the photochemical counterpart "photonitrification" was first reported in 1930.

== Classifying photogeochemical reactions ==
Photogeochemical reactions may be classified based on thermodynamics and/or the nature of the materials involved. In addition, when ambiguity exists regarding an analogous reaction involving light and living organisms (phototrophy), the term "photochemical" may be used to distinguish a particular abiotic reaction from the corresponding photobiological reaction. For example, "photooxidation of iron(II)" can refer to either a biological process driven by light (phototrophic or photobiological iron oxidation) or a strictly chemical, abiotic process (photochemical iron oxidation). Similarly, an abiotic process that converts water to O_{2} under the action of light may be designated "photochemical oxidation of water" rather than simply "photooxidation of water", in order to distinguish it from photobiological oxidation of water potentially occurring in the same environment (by algae, for example).

=== Thermodynamics ===
Photogeochemical reactions are described by the same principles used to describe photochemical reactions in general, and may be classified similarly:

1. Photosynthesis: in the most general sense, photosynthesis refers to any light-activated reaction for which the change in free energy (ΔG^{o}) is positive for the reaction itself (without considering the presence of a catalyst or light). The products have higher energy than the reactants, and therefore the reaction is thermodynamically unfavorable, except through the action of light in conjunction with a catalyst. Examples of photosynthetic reactions include the splitting of water to form H_{2} and O_{2}, the reaction of CO_{2} and water to form O_{2} and reduced carbon compounds such as methanol and methane, and the reaction of N_{2} with water to yield NH_{3} and O_{2}.
2. Photocatalysis: this refers to reactions that are accelerated by the presence of a catalyst (the light itself is not the catalyst as may be erroneously implied). The overall reaction has a negative change in free energy, and is therefore thermodynamically favored. Examples of photocatalytic reactions include the reaction of organic compounds with O_{2} to form CO_{2} and water, and the reaction of organic compounds with water to give H_{2} and CO_{2}.
3. Uncatalyzed photoreactions: photoinduced or photoactivated reactions proceed via the action of light alone. For example, photodegradation of organic compounds often proceeds without a catalyst if the reactants themselves absorb light.

=== Nature of reactants ===
Any reaction in the domain of photogeochemistry, either observed in the environment or studied in the laboratory, may be broadly classified according to the nature of the materials involved.

1. Reactions among naturally occurring compounds. Photogeochemistry, both observational and exploratory, is concerned with reactions among materials known to occur naturally, as this reflects what happens or may happen on Earth.
2. Reactions in which one or more of the reactants are not known to occur naturally. Studies of reactions among materials related to naturally occurring materials may contribute to understanding of natural processes. These complementary studies are relevant to photogeochemistry in that they illustrate reactions that may have a natural counterpart. For example, it has been shown that soils, when irradiated, can generate reactive oxygen species and that clay minerals present in soils can accelerate the degradation of synthetic chemicals; it may therefore be postulated that naturally occurring compounds are similarly affected by sunlight acting on soil. The conversion of N_{2} to NH_{3} has been observed upon irradiation in the presence of the iron titanate Fe_{2}Ti_{2}O_{7}. While such a compound is not known to occur naturally, it is related to ilmenite (FeTiO_{3}) and pseudobrookite (Fe_{2}TiO_{5}), and can form upon heating of ilmenite; this may imply a similar reaction with N_{2} for the naturally occurring minerals.

== Photogeochemical catalysts ==
=== Direct catalysts ===
Direct photogeochemical catalysts act by absorbing light and subsequently transferring energy to reactants.

==== Semiconducting minerals ====
The majority of observed photogeochemical reactions involve a mineral catalyst. Many naturally occurring minerals are semiconductors that absorb some portion of solar radiation. These semiconducting minerals are frequently transition metal oxides and sulfides and include abundant, well-known minerals such as hematite (Fe_{2}O_{3}), magnetite (Fe_{3}O_{4}), goethite and lepidocrocite (FeOOH), and pyrolusite (MnO_{2}). Radiation of energy equal to or greater than the band gap of a semiconductor is sufficient to excite an electron from the valence band to a higher energy level in the conduction band, leaving behind an electron hole (h^{+}); the resulting electron-hole pair is called an exciton. The excited electron and hole can reduce and oxidize, respectively, species having suitable redox potentials relative to the potentials of the valence and conduction bands. Semiconducting minerals with appropriate band gaps and appropriate band energy levels can catalyze a vast array of reactions, most commonly at mineral-water or mineral-gas interfaces.

==== Organic compounds ====
Organic compounds such as "bio-organic substances" and humic substances are also able to absorb light and act as catalysts or sensitizers, accelerating photoreactions that normally occur slowly or facilitating reactions that might not normally occur at all.

=== Indirect catalysts ===
Some materials, such as certain silicate minerals, absorb little or no solar radiation, but may still participate in light-driven reactions by mechanisms other than direct transfer of energy to reactants.

==== Production of reactive species ====
Indirect photocatalysis may occur via the production of a reactive species which then participates in another reaction. For example, photodegradation of certain compounds has been observed in the presence of kaolinite and montmorillonite, and this may proceed via the formation of reactive oxygen species at the surface of these clay minerals. Indeed, reactive oxygen species have been observed when soil surfaces are exposed to sunlight. The ability of irradiated soil to generate singlet oxygen was found to be independent of the organic matter content, and both the mineral and organic components of soil appear to contribute to this process. Indirect photolysis in soil has been observed to occur at depths of up to 2 mm due to migration of reactive species; in contrast, direct photolysis (in which the degraded compound itself absorbs light) was restricted to a "photic depth" of 0.2 to 0.4 mm. Like certain minerals, organic matter in solution, as well as particulate organic matter, may act as an indirect catalyst via formation of singlet oxygen which then reacts with other compounds.

==== Surface sensitization ====
Indirect catalysts may also act through surface sensitization of reactants, by which species sorbed to a surface become more susceptible to photodegradation.

=== True catalysis ===
Strictly speaking, the term "catalysis" should not be used unless it can be shown that the number of product molecules produced per number of active sites is greater than one; this is difficult to do in practice, although it is often assumed to be true if there is no loss in the photoactivity of the catalyst for an extended period of time. Reactions that are not strictly catalytic may be designated "assisted photoreactions". Furthermore, phenomena that involve complex mixtures of compounds (e.g. soil) may be hard to classify unless complete reactions (not just individual reactants or products) can be identified.

== Experimental approaches ==
The great majority of photogeochemical research is performed in the laboratory, as it is easier to demonstrate and observe a particular reaction under controlled conditions. This includes confirming the identity of materials, designing reaction vessels, controlling light sources, and adjusting the reaction atmosphere. However, observation of natural phenomena often provides initial inspiration for further study. For example, during the 1970s it was generally agreed that nitrous oxide (N_{2}O) has a short residence time in the troposphere, although the actual explanation for its removal was unknown. Since N_{2}O does not absorb light at wavelengths greater than 280 nm, direct photolysis had been discarded as a possible explanation. It was then observed that light would decompose chloromethanes when they were absorbed on silica sand, and this occurred at wavelengths far above the absorption spectra for these compounds. The same phenomenon was observed for N_{2}O, leading to the conclusion that particulate matter in the atmosphere is responsible for the destruction of N_{2}O via surface-sensitized photolysis. Indeed, the idea of such a sink for atmospheric N_{2}O was supported by several reports of low concentrations of N_{2}O in the air above deserts, where there is a high amount of suspended particulate matter. As another example, the observation that the amount of nitrous acid in the atmosphere greatly increases during the day lead to insight into the surface photochemistry of humic acids and soils and an explanation for the original observation.

== Photogeochemical reactions ==
The following table lists some reported reactions that are relevant to photogeochemical study, including reactions that involve only naturally occurring compounds as well as complementary reactions that involve synthetic but related compounds. The selection of reactions and references given is merely illustrative and may not exhaustively reflect current knowledge, especially in the case of popular reactions such as nitrogen photofixation for which there is a large body of literature. Furthermore, although these reactions have natural counterparts, the probability of encountering optimal reaction conditions may be low in some cases; for example, most experimental work concerning CO_{2} photoreduction is intentionally performed in the absence of O_{2}, since O_{2} almost always suppresses the reduction of CO_{2}. In natural systems, however, it is uncommon to find an analogous context where CO_{2} and a catalyst are reached by light but there is no O_{2} present.

=== Reactions in the nitrogen cycle ===
Reaction	Type of reaction	Catalyst/reaction conditions	Related biological or chemical process
N_{2} → NH_{3}	photofixation (photoreduction) of dinitrogen	desert sands in air; ZnO, Al_{2}O_{3}, Fe_{2}O_{3}, Ni_{2}O_{3}, CoO, CuO, MnO_{2}, and sterile soil; aqueous suspensions of TiO_{2}, ZnO, CdS, SrTiO_{3} and hydrous iron(III) oxide under N_{2}; iron titanate	biological nitrogen fixation (reductive)
N_{2} + H_{2}O → NH_{3} + O_{2}	photoreduction of dinitrogen + photooxidation of water	TiO_{2} under near-UV irradiation in the absence of O_{2}; Fe-doped TiO_{2} and α-Fe_{2}O_{3} under sunlight	
N_{2} → N_{2}H_{4}	photofixation (photoreduction) of dinitrogen	desert sands in air	
N_{2} + H_{2}O → N_{2}H_{4} + O_{2}	photoreduction of dinitrogen + photooxidation of water	TiO_{2} under near-UV irradiation in the absence of O_{2}	
N_{2} + O_{2} → NO	photofixation (photooxidation) of dinitrogen	TiO_{2} in air	chemical nitrogen fixation (oxidative)
N_{2} → NO^{−}_{3}	photooxidation of dinitrogen	aqueous suspension of ZnO under N_{2}	
N_{2} + H_{2}O → NO^{−}_{2} + H_{2}	photooxidation of dinitrogen + photoreduction of water	ZnO-Fe_{2}O_{3} under N_{2}	
NH_{3} → NO^{−}_{2} NH_{3} → NO^{−}_{3}	photooxidation of ammonia ("photonitrification")	TiO_{2}; ZnO, Al_{2}O_{3}, and SiO_{2;} and in sterile soil	nitrification (biological ammonia oxidation)
NH_{3} → N_{2}O		TiO_{2}	nitrification
NH^{+}_{4} + NO^{−}_{2} → N_{2}		TiO_{2}, ZnO, Fe_{2}O_{3}, and soil	chemodenitrification; anammox; thermal decomposition of ammonium nitrite
NH_{4}NO_{3} → N_{2}O		on Al_{2}O_{3}	denitrification; thermal decomposition of ammonium nitrate
NO^{−}_{3} or HNO_{3} → NO, NO_{2}, N_{2}O	photoreduction of nitrate; photodenitrification; renoxification	on Al_{2}O_{3}; TiO_{2}; SiO_{2}; α-Fe_{2}O3, ZnO; Sahara sand	denitrification
NO_{2} → HONO		on humic acids and soil	
NO^{−}_{3} → NH_{3}		TiO_{2}	dissimilatory nitrate reduction to ammonia
N_{2}O → N_{2}		observed with sands of various composition	decomposition of nitrous oxide (terminal reaction of biological denitrification)
N_{2}O → N_{2} + O_{2}	photodissociation of nitrous oxide	ZnO under UV irradiation; TiO_{2} and Ag-doped TiO_{2} under UV irradiation	thermal dissociation of nitrous oxide
amino acids → NH_{3}	photoammonification (photomineralization of organic N)	on Fe_{2}O_{3} or soil in sunlight	biological ammonification (mineralization of N)
dissolved organic N → NH_{3}	photoammonification (photomineralization of organic N)		biological ammonification (mineralization of N)

=== Reactions in the carbon cycle ===
Reaction	Type of reaction	Catalyst/reaction conditions	Related biological or chemical process
CO_{2} → CO CO_{2} → HCOOH CO_{2} → CH_{2}O CO_{2} → CH_{3}OH CO_{2} → CH_{4}	photochemical reduction of CO_{2} (one-carbon products)	A vast, well-reviewed ^{e.g.} body of literature on solar fuel production (artificial photosynthesis); numerous catalysts	bacterial reduction of CO_{2}; plant and algal photosynthesis
1. CO_{2} → C_{2}H_{5}OH; 2. CO_{2} → C_{2}H_{4}, C_{2}H_{6}; 3. CO_{2} → tartaric, glyoxylic, oxalic acids	photochemical reduction of CO_{2} (products with more than one carbon)	1. SiC 2. SiC/Cu; 3. ZnS	
CO_{2} + H_{2}O → CH_{4}		SrTiO_{3} under vacuum	
CH_{4} → CH_{2}O CH_{4} → CO_{2}	photochemical oxidation of methane	production of CO_{2}, CO, and formate observed over titanium dioxide	assimilatory methanotrophy (formaldehyde), other aerobic methane metabolism (CO_{2}), anaerobic oxidation of methane (CO_{2})
CH_{4} → C_{2}H_{6} + H_{2}	photoinduced direct methane coupling	SiO_{2}-Al_{2}O_{3}-TiO_{2}	
CH_{3}COOH → CH_{4} + CO_{2}		observed on TiO_{2} under an atmosphere of N_{2}	acetoclastic methanogenesis
CH_{3}COOH → C_{2}H_{6}		TiO_{2}	acetoclastic methanogenesis; oxidative decarboxylation
CH_{3}CH_{2}COOH → C_{3}H_{8} + CO_{2}			oxidative decarboxylation
plant litter → CO_{2} ?	photodegradation of plant litter		microbial decomposition
plant components (e.g. pectin) in oxic conditions → CH_{4}		UV irradiation	methanogenesis
soil in oxic conditions → CH_{4}		UV irradiation	methanogenesis
decomposition of dissolved organic matter	1. uncatalyzed photodegradation; 2. photocatalytic degradation; 3. photochemical mineralization (CO and CO_{2} as products)	observed without catalysts or with catalysts such as iron(III) species and TiO_{2}; shown to occur in oceans	biological metabolism in general
sorbed organic matter → dissolved organic matter	photochemical dissolution		biological dissolution/degradation
oxidation of carbohydrates and fats		observed both with and without ZnO	aerobic metabolism in general
Chlorofluorocarbons → Cl^{−} + F^{−} + CO_{2}		TiO_{2}, ZnO, Fe_{2}O_{3}, kaolin, SiO_{2}, Al_{2}O_{3}	biological degradation

=== Other reactions, including coupled cycles ===
Reaction	Type of reaction	Catalyst/reaction conditions	Related biological or chemical process
H_{2}O → H_{2}	photoreduction of water	numerous catalysts under UV and visible light	biological hydrogen production
H_{2}O → O_{2}	photooxidation of water	on α-Fe_{2}O_{3}; layered double hydroxide minerals	oxidation of water by plants, algae, and some bacteria
H_{2}O → H_{2} + O_{2}	photochemical water splitting	TiO_{2}	(thermochemical water splitting, e.g. the iron oxide cycle)
CO + H_{2}O → CO_{2} + H_{2}			
CH_{4} + NH_{3} + H_{2}O → amino acids + H_{2}		Pt/TiO_{2}	
CO + NH_{3} → HCONH_{2}			
FeCO_{3} + H_{2}O → H_{2} + CO_{2} + Fe_{3}O_{4}/γ-Fe_{2}O_{3}	photoreduction of water, photochemical oxidation of Fe(II)	UV irradiation under anoxic conditions	
FeCO_{3} + CO_{2} → organic compounds + FeOOH	abiotic photosynthesis, photochemical oxidation of Fe(II)	UV irradiation	
colloidal Fe(III) (hydr)oxides and Mn(IV) oxides → aqueous Fe(II) and Mn(II)	photochemical dissolution (reductive)	with or without organic ligands	biological reductive dissolution
dissolved organic matter and Fe → particulate organic matter and Fe	photochemical flocculation		
ZnS → Zn^{0} + S^{0} (absence of air) ZnS → Zn^{0} + SO^{2−}_{4} (presence of air)	photocorrosion	; primarily affects sulfide semiconductors	bacterial oxidation of sulfides, e.g.pyrite
