= European Society for Paediatric Research =

The European Society for Paediatric Research (ESPR) is a professional association of neonatal and paediatric researchers comprising different sub-specialties. Together with its sister organisations, the American Pediatric Society (APS) and the Society for Pediatric Research (SPR), it publishes the peer-reviewed scientific journal Pediatric Research. The ESPR was founded in 1958.

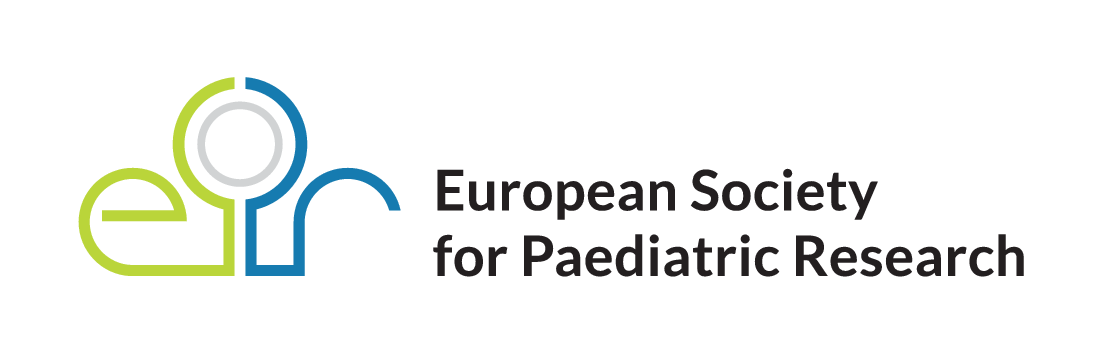
ESPR logo

== The Sections ==
A part of the ESPR's Council, the sections represent different Paediatric sub-specialties:

- Brain, Development, and Imaging
- Circulation, Haematology and Oxygen transport
- Early Career Investigators
- Epidemiology
- Infection, Inflammation, Immunology, and Immunisation.
- Neonatal Resuscitation
- Nursing and other Healthcare Professionals
- Nutrition, Metabolism and Gastroenterology
- Paediatric and Neonatal Pharmacology
- Pulmonology

The ESPR sections are open to all members of the society as well as prospective members.

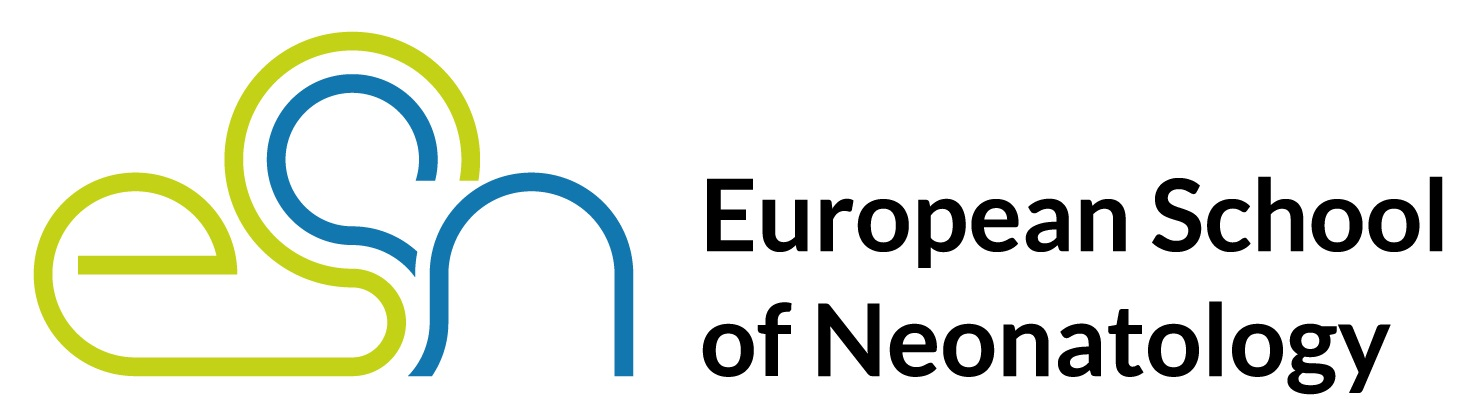
ESN logo

== The European School of Neonatology (ESN) ==
As the educational arm of the ESPR, the ESN is committed to improving professional neonatal training in Europe and beyond. To achieve this goal, the ESN is developing a Master of Advanced Studies (MAS) in Neonatology and related educational offers and spin off projects. The ESN seeks to facilitate the harmonisation of neonatal education across the globe based on the European Training Requirements (ETR) in Neonatology. Considering the principles of evidence-based medicine, it joins theory and practice to equip medical professionals with the right competencies to practice Neonatology at all levels of care. The ESN has the ambition to improve neonatal healthcare worldwide through education and contribute to the reduction of infant mortality and complication-free survival.

Medical specialty training to become a neonatologist and specialty nursing training to become an intensive care nurse for children and newborns are regulated at the national level in Europe, with strong differences in terms of professional, time and administrative requirements across member states. In some countries there are no regulations. Therefore, the European Union of Medical Specialists (UEMS), the highest European medical association, commissioned the ESPR – as the representative organisation of medical and nursing interests in Neonatology in Europe – to draw up a detailed catalogue of subjects, including specific competences for specialty training as a neonatologist. This revised catalogue was prepared by the ESPR and adopted by the UEMS in 2021. It is called the European Training Requirements (ETR) in Neonatology. The ESN was set up to be the ESPR’s educational arm, supported by international specialists in didactics and educational management, and drawing on the medical knowledge of the society’s experts. The ESN puts the ETR Neonatology into practice.

The ESN offers four fully integrated educational programmes:

- A clinically integrated Master of Advanced Studies (MAS) in Neonatology: It structures and aligns medical and nursing specialist training in Neonatology on a competence basis and links it to the clinical work of the participants through tasks trainees complete in practice under the supervision of their local supervisors. The MAS is based on the Entrustable Professional Activity (EPA) framework.
- Special Courses and Training that complement the MAS: These courses take place online and in person (e.g. pre-conference courses on respiratory support) and comprise a wide range of theory, skills, and competencies relevant for medical professionals in Neonatology.
- An academically focused Master of Science (MSc) in Neonatology: Offered since 2015 in collaboration with the University of Southampton, the Neonatal Online Training and Education Programme (NOTE) focusses on the theoretical aspects of neonatal medicine.
- The free 16-part lecture series ‘Perspectives on Effective Neonatology’: Composed of pre-recorded presentations followed by live discussions, this format gives a glimpse of the topics taught in the two master’s programmes.

== European Board of Neonatal & Child Health Research (EBNCHR) ==
The European Board of Neonatal & Child Health Research (EBNCHR), formerly known as the European Board of Neonatology (EBN), serves as the policy-focused branch of the ESPR.

As a representative organisation, the EBNCHR includes one delegate from each EU National Neonatal Society or, where such a society does not exist, from a Perinatal or Paediatric Society within the respective country.

The EBNCHR fulfills four core responsibilities within the ESPR:

- Advocating for the society's interests at the European political level;
- Periodically reviewing and updating the European Training Requirements (ETR) in Neonatology;
- Promoting the full implementation of the ETR Neonatology across EU member states;
- Encouraging international collaboration in research.

Policy initiatives are carried out by the EBNCHR’s dedicated Research Funding Working Group. This team, composed of ESPR members and external experts, provides leadership in shaping child health research policies.

== Pediatric Research ==
The official journal of the American Pediatric Society (APS), the Society for Pediatric Research (SPR), and the ESPR, Pediatric Research features a wide range of content. It publishes original translational research articles, invited reviews, and commentaries that explore the causes and treatments of childhood diseases and developmental disorders, spanning topics from basic science to epidemiology and quality improvement.

== The Annual Conferences: jENS & CEPAS ==
The ESPR hosts two biennial international meetings:

- The joint European Neonatal Societies Congress (jENS): The ESPR's neonatal conference organised together with the Union of European Neonatal and Perinatal Societies (UENPS) and the European Foundation for the Care of Newborn Infants (EFCNI).
- The Congress of European Paediatric Academic Societies (CEPAS): The ESPR's new paediatric conference and the successor of EAPS, organised jointly with the European Academy of Paediatrics (EAP).

== Membership requirements ==
Membership to the ESPR is available to any professional who:

- Aligns with the society's mission and goals.
- Has made at least one scientific contribution (such as a presentation or poster) at one of the society's annual meetings.
