= Carapelli =

Italian food company

Carapelli Firenze S.p.A.
- Company type: Private
- Industry: Food
- Founded: 1893
- Headquarters: Tavarnelle Val di Pesa, Italy
- Products: Vegetable oils
- Parent: Deoleo, S.A (Spain)
- Website: www.carapelli.com

Carapelli (Carapelli Firenze SpA) is an Italian food company, since 2005 owned by Spanish multinational Deoleo, S.A, based in Tavarnelle Val di Pesa, which is a small town in the Metropolitan City of Florence, most famous for its extra virgin olive oil. The company was started as a home business in 1893 by Cesira and Costantino Carapelli. Other members of the Carapelli family joined the business and the company rapidly grew in size and popularity, to become the most modernised food company in Italy by the 1940s. Today, Carapelli Firenze SpA is the leading Italian extra virgin olive oil company (with brand such as Carapelli, Sasso, Maya) where 30% of its production is exported to Europe and the Americas.

== History ==
=== 1893: The Beginning ===
On 23 September 1893, the day of their wedding, Cesira & Constantino Carapelli founded the family business with her dowry. With 300 lire the couple bought a warehouse in Montevarchi to trade in grain, oil and other agricultural produce

=== 1939-40: Post War ===
On the eve of war, the Carapelli family set up the most modern wheat mill of the time just outside Florence, in Ponte a Ema. Right next to it they also built the first oil-pressing factory. The war and bombardments that destroyed everything did little to curb their efforts and their will to succeed. Reconstruction started in Novoli, which was then open countryside and over the years, a plant was established.

=== 1995: Tavernelle ===
Carapelli moves production to Tavarnelle Val di Pesa in the Chianti region.

=== 2001: Instituto Nutrizionale Carapelli ===
The Instituto Nutrizionale Carapelli is a non-profit foundation for scientific research into the olive oil sector and the education and spreading of the awareness of the importance of a correct diet.

=== 2005: Spanish multinational Deoleo ===
In 2005, Carapelli was acquired by the Spanish multinational Deoleo as part of a series of acquisitions of Italian olive oil brands, including Sasso and, in 2008, Bertolli, which was sold by Unilever.

== Controversy ==
In 2009, Carapelli filed and lost a lawsuit against a German journalist for publishing proof of bad quality and false labelling of Carapelli olive oils.

In 2010, a study by researchers at University of California, Davis found that Carapelli's Extra Virgin Olive Oil failed to meet "Extra Virgin" standards.

In 2015, Carapelli were once again investigated by the Italian authorities and found guilty of passing off lower quality oil as extra virgin olive oil.

In 2017, Carapelli responded to the accusations by stating that the news on the fake olive oil, that were based on a study made in 2010 by the University of California Davis Olive Center, were not true and that the study was completely discredited by the International Olive Council (IOC) through several statements since the methodology used was not in line with the IOC standards.
