= Curaxys =

Spanish biopharmaceutical company

Curaxys is a Spanish biopharmaceutical company specializing in the research, development and production of biosimilar (generic biological) drugs. Located in the Technological Park of El Puerto de Santa Maria (Bay of Cádiz) in Andalusia, the company collaborates on research with the University of Cadiz.

Curaxys has patented a process for producing insulin from plant cells as well as a process for developing cancer drugs from cultured human cells.
