= Vitelcom =

Spanish consumer electronics manufacturer and distributor

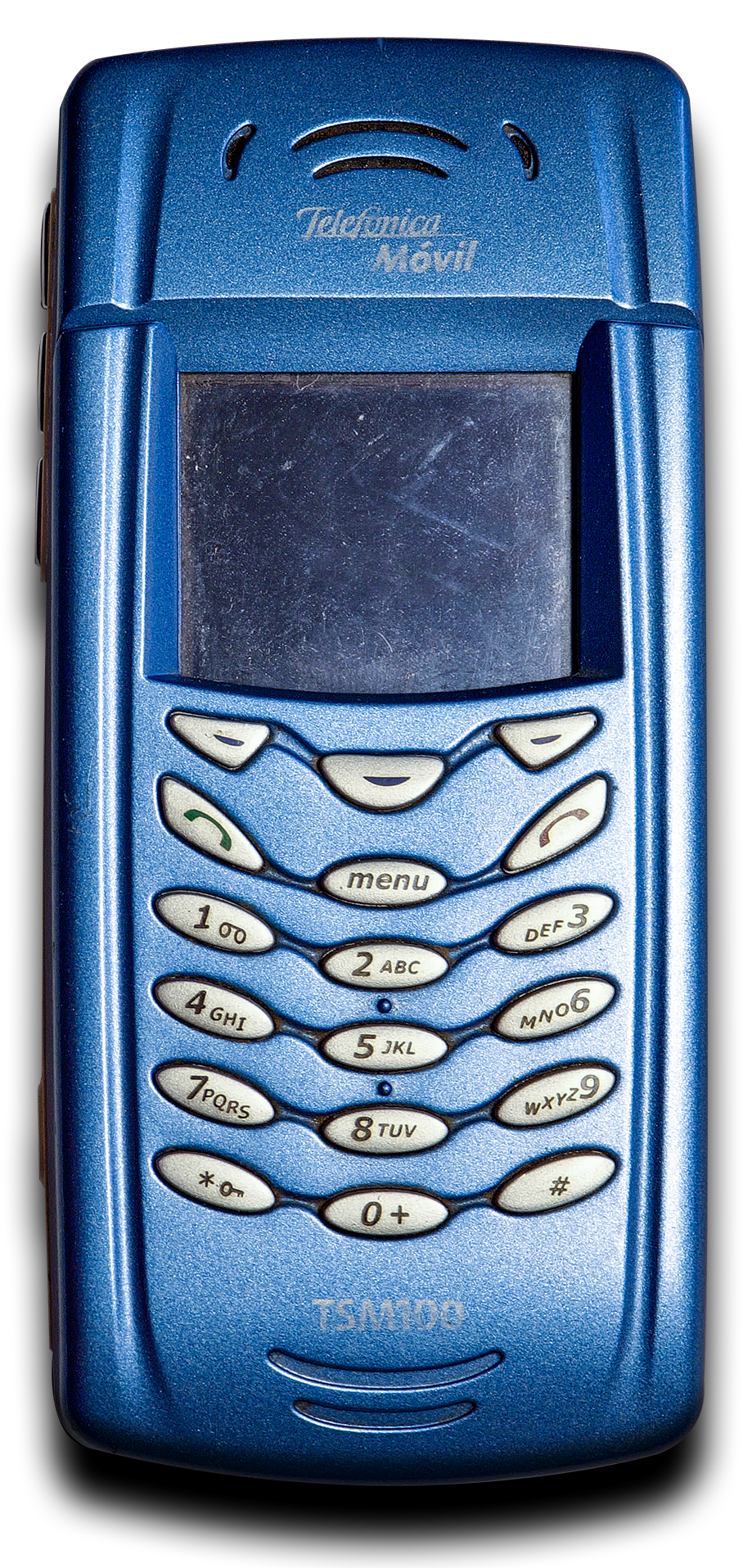
The Vitelcom TSM100 mobile phone.

Vitelcom Group was a Spanish manufacturer and distributor of consumer electronics, concentrating on the home entertainment and mobile phone markets. It also provided mobile phone content such as games.

== Brands ==
Vitelcom made DVD and VCR equipment under contract using the Funai brand name, mobile phones using the Grundig mobile name under license, plus handheld computer equipment and ADSL modems.

== History ==
Primary markets were Iberia and Latin America, although Vitelcom had some success in selling mobile handsets to a wider market, either under the Grundig brand or branded by the local mobile network operator.

During 2004 to 2005 Vitelcom was engaged in a patent infringement dispute with Nokia which was resolved before it went to court.

In 2007 the company fell into administration and was wound up in 2008. The name "Vitelcom" is now used by a New Zealand IT company.

== Products ==
Product released: TSM5, TSM30 and TSM1000

== See also ==
- Alcatel Mobile
