= Grupo Gea Perona =

Spanish fuel transportation company

Grupo Gea Perona is a Spanish transportation company primarily active in the oil and gas industry, founded in 1926 by Francisco Gea Perona.

The company transports refined petroleum products by road and distributes products for Repsol, Endesa and Gas Natural. The group also manages re-gasification plants.

== History ==
Grupo Gea Perona was established in Spain in 1926 by Francisco Gea Perona, initially as a fuel importer and later as a company specializing in the transport of hazardous goods by road. In 1960, the company began a long-term collaboration with Campsa, serving as a carrier and distributor in several Spanish provinces. In 1984, the company founded Naftrán to cater to the emerging market for the transportation of hazardous materials, including food, chemicals, and LNG. In 2006, Naftrán acquired Cringás S.L., which focuses on cryogenics and natural gas engineering. The company underwent a significant transformation in 2018, aligning its mission and vision with international decarbonization strategies. In 2020, Hidrona was created to provide comprehensive access to hydrogen as a clean energy source. In 2023, Hynology was founded to market LNG, bioLNG, and Guarantees of Origin.
