= Natra =

International chocolate products company

NATRA
- Type: Privately held company
- Industry: Production and sale of chocolate products and cocoa ingredients
- Founded: 1943
- Headquarters: Madrid, Spain
- Key people: Dominique Luna Tudela (CEO)
- Products: Chocolate products and cocoa ingredients
- Brands: Specialised in private labels
- Revenue: €473,3 million (2022)
- Number of employees: +1000 (average 2022)
- Website: Natra

Natra is an international company and one of the leading European producers and distributors of chocolate products and cocoa ingredients, focusing on private label for the leading retail companies and co-manufacturing for global brands.

Natra's Consumer product division is responsible for the manufacturing of chocolate tablets, pralines, spreads and chocolate bars that are sold in more than 90 countries over the five continents. Natra is also the main cocoa bean processor in Spain, responsible for 40% of cocoa grinding. Through its Ingredients division, the company provides cocoa derivatives (mainly cocoa butter, cocoa powder and chocolate coatings) for the international food industry.

Around 75% of the company’s turnover is generated outside Spain.

The company has six production plants (two in Spain, two in Belgium, one in France and one in Canada) and permanent commercial presence in Europe, America and Asia.

== Origin and development ==
In 1943, three young chemists from Valencia (Arturo Benlloch, Juan Ferrándiz and Álvaro Faubel) invented a process for extracting theobromine, an alkaloid very similar to caffeine that is only found in cocoa. This gave rise to the creation of Natra. In 1951 the business was expanded to include the production and sale of cocoa products. The company’s first factory was set up in Mislata (Valencia) with a loan from Banco Industrial. In 2004 Natra took over Zahor (Spain) and embarked on a process of vertical integration, up to the end product for consumers. Zahor had a strong customer base and a significant turnover in Europe and it had just bought a plant in France specialising in chocolate tablets. A year later, Chocolaterie Jacali (Belgium) was acquired and Natra extended its product range to include Belgian chocolates and specialties. In 2007 Natra bought All Crump (Belgium) and set up a new business unit to produce spreads. As from 2012 Natra stepped up the growth of its consumer division outside Europe, especially in America and Asia. In 2017-2018 Natra started to implement a new customer-centric Transformation Plan to boost sustainable growth of the company. The Plan brought in a new organisational model and renovation of the management team. In 2020, Natra invested 20.9M€ to modernise and adapt their factories in Valencia and Malle to the latest technological advances. And in 2021, through a total investment of 25M€ in their Saint Etienne plant (France), Natra considerably increased their industrial chocolate production capacity to the region and adjacent.

== Present and future ==
The company, which celebrated its 80th anniversary in 2023, is constantly adapting its business to the changing market and consumer trends and boosting its sustainable growth. Natra is a member of the Rainforest Alliance to boost the sustainable production of cocoa. It also belongs to the global network of the UN Global Compact to promote and implement the Sustainable Development Goals (SDG). Natra is certified under the ISO 20400 standard, which guarantees the sustainable procurement of raw materials. The company also has the key certifications for traceability and food safety to guarantee the quality and suitability of its products for its customers and consumers. Natra’s food safety management systems are certified under prestigious international standards such as the BRC (British Retail Consortium), IFS (International Food Standard) and FSSC 22000. Natra also has specific certifications for certain products aimed at specific markets or segments of society, for example Kosher and Halal, as well as fair trade, ecological products and sustainable origin seals and certificates. Through the efforts made to create a positive impact in the social and ecological landscape, Natra was granted the B-Corp certification in 2022; becoming the first non-branded chocolate producer to join the B-Corp community.
