= Budgetplaces =

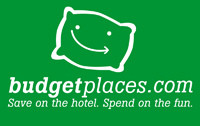
- Company type: Online travel agency
- Headquarters: Barcelona, Spain
- Owner: EnGrande S.L.
- Founder: John Erceg
- Industry: Travel
- Products: Hotels, hostels, apartments and B&Bs
- Services: Budget accommodation Reservation website
- Employees: 130+
- Website: budgetplaces.com
- Launched: 2008

Budgetplaces was an online travel agency (OTA) that offered low-cost accommodation. In April 2012, Budgetplaces was working with over 10,000 budget hotels, hostels, bed-and-breakfasts and apartments in more than 100 countries worldwide. In January 2017, Budgetplaces was acquired by the eDreams ODIGEO group.

== Company history ==
Budgetplaces was founded under the trading name EnGrande S.L. in Barcelona in 2003. John Erceg, from California, created the concept of offering only no-frills budget accommodation at a target rate of 30 Euros per person per night. This target rate is reflected in the name of the website Barcelona30.com.

After experiencing tremendous success in Barcelona, Erceg decided to replicate the model in Paris and Paris35.com (as a reflection of a target rate of 35 Euros pppn) was launched. By 2007 websites for London, Berlin, Rome and other major European cities had followed.

In 2008, after reaching a total of over 20 destinations and more than 3,000 partner hotels, hostels, apartments and bed-and-breakfasts, Budgetplaces was introduced as EnGrande's new leading brand, uniting all destinations on one website.

Palamon Capital Partners acquired a majority stake in EnGrande S.L. in July 2011, which further accelerated Budgetplaces’ international expansion. As of April 2012, Budgetplaces was collaborating with over 10,000 partner establishments in more than 1,700 worldwide destinations. Over 130 staff of more than 30 different nationalities are employed at the company's headquarters in Barcelona and its branch offices in New York City, London and Berlin.

The World Economic Forum recognized budgetplaces.com as one of 22 successful startup companies in a 2011 report published in collaboration with Stanford University. The report focused on “Successful Growth Strategies of Early-Stage Companies” and featured Budgetplaces alongside Air Arabia, atrapalo.com, eBay, Microsoft and Skype, amongst others.

In April 2012, Spanish national daily newspaper El País called Budgetplaces a “paradigmatic case” (Un caso paradigmático) of a successful, technology-based startup company founded in Spain.

== Carbon-neutral hotel stays ==
In late 2010, Budgetplaces launched its carbon offset program in collaboration with Barcelona-based offset provider Offset Options.

A month after the program's inception, Budgetplaces reported that 5% of its customers had chosen to make their hotel stay carbon-neutral. This figure was forecast to increase to 10% by the end of 2011.
