= Lacasa =

Spanish confectionery company

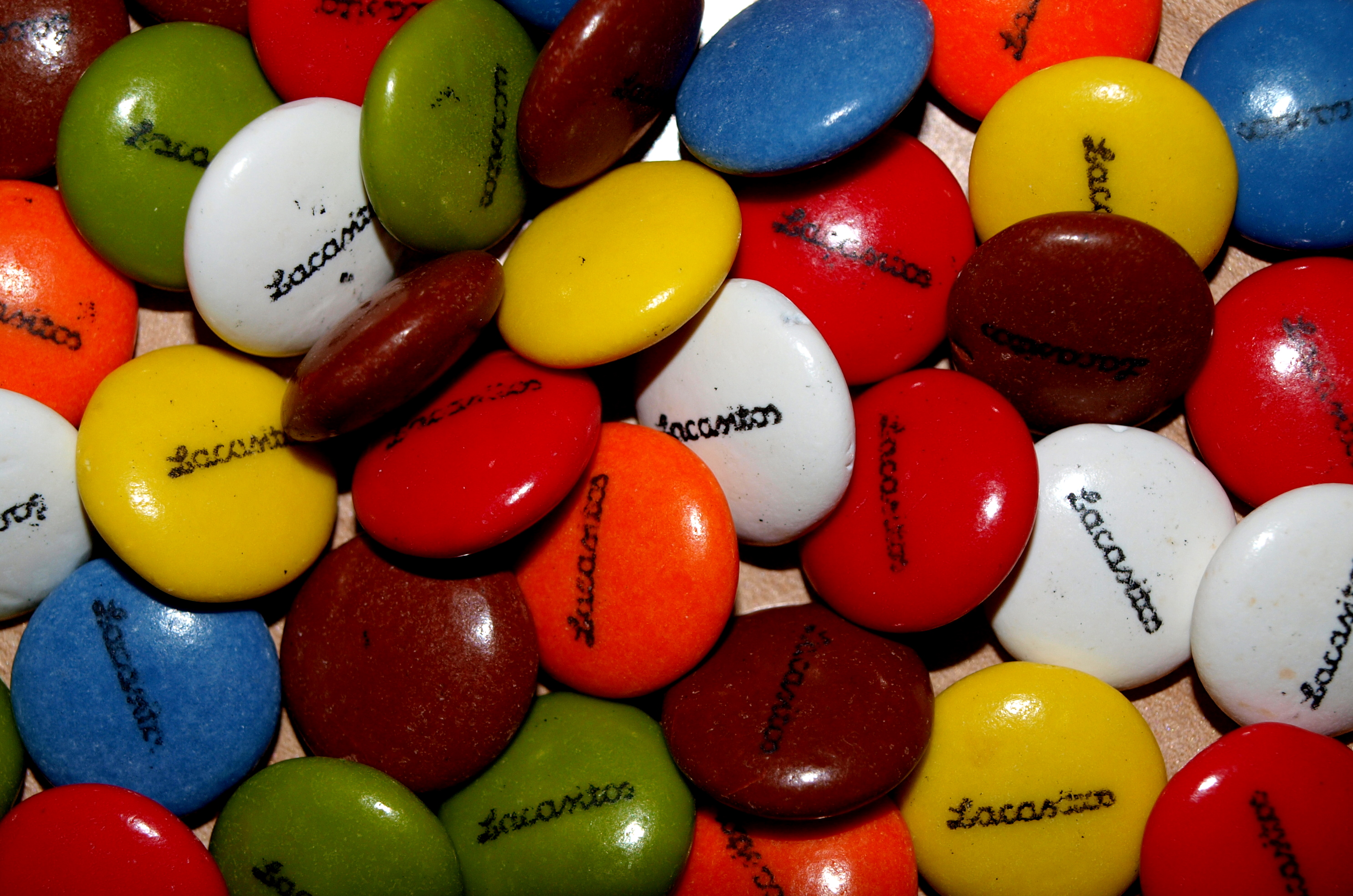
- Industry: Confectionery
- Founded: 1852
- Headquarters: Zaragoza, Spain
- Key people: José Lacasa Piens (Chairman)
- Products: Chocolates Lacasa, Comercial Chocolates Lacasa, Bombonera Vallisoletana, Productos Mauri, Chocolates Del Norte, lacasavital
- Website: www.lacasa.es

Lacasa S.A. is a Spanish confectionery company, headquartered in Zaragoza. The group includes Chocolates Lacasa, Comercial Chocolates Lacasa, Bombonera Vallisoletana, Productos Mauri, Chocolates Del Norte, lacasavital, and has marketing offices or factories in places such as Argentina, Belgium, France, Portugal, Spain, and the United States.

== History ==
It is the oldest chocolate-producing factory in Spain, founded in the middle of the nineteenth century by José Lacasa Piens in Jaca, a small town in the foothills of the Pyrenees. Now based in Zaragoza, Lacasa S.A. has grown steadily, and became one of Europe's leading confectioners, and also one of the first to have received the ISO 9002 Quality Certification.

The new business policy of consolidation in the market started in that decade, went through the expansion of its factory in Utebo in 1991, followed by the acquisition of different companies in the sector, such as Productos Mauri, S.A. (Barcelona), Bombonera Vallisoletana (Valladolid), Chocolates del Norte (Oviedo).

In May 1998, the Minister of Agriculture, Fisheries and Food, Loyola de Palacio, awarded the Order of Agrarian, Fisheries and Food Merit (Food Merit section) to Carmen Echeverría for her effort in directing Lacasa.
