= Grundig mobile =

Brand

Grundig Mobile was a brand licensed by Koç Holding of Turkey to Vitelcom of Spain for mobile phones and accessories. It was established in 2005. Grundig Mobile products were developed in conjunction with Purple Labs and SkySpring. The product portfolio covered a wide spectrum of mobile technology, beginning with the low cost a-series of phones and ending with UMTS and other high-end products. In 2007 Vitelcom fell into administration and was wound up in 2008. Grundig Mobile phones are no longer made.
