= Bassols 1790 =

Bassols 1790 is probably the oldest still active textile company in the world.

== Heritage and history ==
Bassols 1790 was founded in Spain in the city of Vic. Francisco Bassols set up the first linen weaving mills in Spain. By 1830, his son and successor, José Bassols Soler had established an industrial scale linen mill with a large number of hand looms on Sant Pere street.

When Jose Bassols Soler died in 1883, he left the business in the hands of his son Ramon Bassols Torras. Ramon changed the name of the company to Hijo de J. Bassols and built a new larger factory in Moià with hand looms. He also took advantage of the arrival of power looms and built a new factory with such looms in Sant Martí de Provençals (actual Barcelona).

Building upon the remarkable initiative of Francisco and the conservative perseverance of Jose, Ramon Bassols Torras was "one of the first to apply modern mechanical methods to his industry and understood perfectly all the possibilities of flax spinning".

In 1909, Ramon Bassols Torras transferred all three of his factories to Teià where they remain today. In 1888 and 1929, the company competed in national textile exhibitions obtaining gold medals in both. In 1935, Ramon Bassols Torras formed the present company called Hijo de J. Bassols, S.A. in which his children, José Maria Bassols Llata and Ramon Bassols Oliba worked as directors with their father.

After surviving the Spanish Civil War and World War II, direction of the company was taken over by Jose Maria Bassols Llata in 1950. Under his leadership the company continued its focus on manufacturing and opened a jacquard weaving factory in Europe in 1960. This was followed by the launch of Bassols first tablecloth collection in 1969.

In 1980 Bassols launched its first home textile collection and began a transition from a specialty linen manufacturer to a much broader based home textile brand. This transformation was accelerated under the direction of Jose Bassols Lopez de Sagredo and his brother Javier Bassols Lopez de Sagredo who took over from his father as president in 1992. Jose Bassols drove the process of changing the company culture from its manufacturing roots to being fashion, marketing and brand driven.
