= Portillo de Toledo =

- Municipality
- Flag Coat of arms

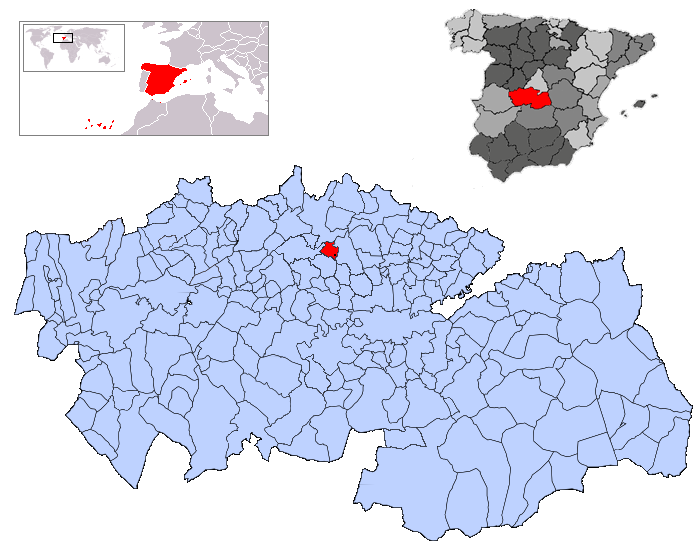

- Location in Castilla-La Mancha Location in Spain
- Coordinates: 40°3′34″N 4°13′26″W
- Country: Spain
- Autonomous community: Castile-La Mancha
- Province: Toledo
- Comarca: Torrijos
- Judicial district: Torrijos

Government
  - Alcalde: María José Ballesteros Recio (PSOE)

Area
  - Total: 19.95 km^{2} (7.70 sq mi)
- Elevation: 594 m (1,949 ft)

Population (2023)
  - Total: 2,308
  - Density: 115.7/km^{2} (299.6/sq mi)
- Demonym(s): Portillano, na
- Time zone: UTC+1 (CET)
  - Summer (DST): UTC+2 (CEST)
- Postal code: 45512
- Official language(s): Castilian

Portillo de Toledo is a village and municipality in the province of Toledo, Spain. In 2023, Portillo de Toledo had 2,308 inhabitants.
