= Transgender quotas in Brazil =

Affirmative action policy

Transgender quotas in Brazil are affirmative action policies aimed at expanding access for transgender and travesti people to educational institutions and public-sector employment. These measures have been implemented mainly in higher education admissions and, more recently, in certain public service recruitment processes, with the stated objective of reducing inequalities in access associated with social and institutional barriers.

Such initiatives are generally presented by their proponents as a way to promote inclusion and address the historical marginalization experienced by transgender and travesti communities in the country.

== Background ==
Transgender quotas in Brazil are part of a broader context of affirmative action policies directed at historically marginalized groups, such as Black and Indigenous populations. The debate over measures specifically aimed at the transgender population gained greater visibility throughout the 2010s, alongside demands for the recognition of rights and the expansion of access to education and the labor market.

Some of the first quota initiatives specifically directed at transgender people were implemented by public universities, such as the Federal University of Bahia (UFBA) and the Rio de Janeiro State University (UERJ), through institutional affirmative action policies intended to broaden access to higher education for this population.

In the case of public service entrance examinations, the adoption of reserved vacancies is more recent and remains limited, with initiatives occurring in certain states, such as São Paulo and Minas Gerais.

At the federal level, legislative proposals have also been introduced with the aim of establishing quotas for transgender people in federal public-sector recruitment processes. Among them is a bill presented by federal deputy Erika Hilton, which proposes reserving 2% of vacancies in federal public service examinations for transgender candidates, based on self-declaration and verification mechanisms. The bill also proposes a periodic review of the policy, with participation from civil society.

== Higher education ==
Although there is no national legislation establishing quotas for transgender people in Brazilian universities, several higher education institutions have adopted their own affirmative action policies directed at this population. Some public universities, such as the State University of Campinas (UNICAMP), have implemented reserved places or specific admission modalities for transgender applicants in certain selection processes.

The Federal University of ABC (UFABC) was the first federal university to implement a quota policy specifically for transgender people, in 2019.

In 2026, Federal University of Pará (UFPA) unanimously approved quotas for trans, transvestite, and non-binary people in undergraduate courses. The measure complies with a recommendation issued by the Federal Public Prosecutor's Office (MPF) in March 2024, following complaints of a lack of quotas and other violations.

Agência Pública reported that, as of 2024, 20 of the 27, of the educational institutions consulted in each federative unit, partially adopted quotas for transgender people, exclusively in some postgraduate courses. It is easier to offer quotas in master's and doctoral degrees because the bureaucracy is lower. Each program has a certain autonomy to make decisions – unlike undergraduate programs, in which each step is defined by a collegiate of professors, students and civil servants, which makes the process much slower. Universities offering post-undergraduate quotas include Federal University of Mato Grosso (UFMT), Federal University for Latin American Integration (UNILA), Federal University of Espírito Santo (UFES), and Federal University of Paraná (UFPR).

=== Lists ===
These lists include national and state universities that offer quotas for, at least, undergraduate degrees.

National universities

1. Federal University of Southern Bahia (UFSB, 2018);
2. Federal University of Bahia (UFBA, 2019);
3. Federal University of ABC (UFABC, 2019);
4. University of International Integration of Afro-Brazilian Lusophony (UNILAB, 2019);
5. Federal University of Rio Grande (FURG, 2022);
6. Federal University of Lavras (UFLA, 2023);
7. Federal University of Santa Catarina (UFSC, 2023);
8. Federal University of Rondônia (UNIR, 2023);
9. Federal University of Santa Maria (UFSM, 2024);
10. Federal University of São Paulo (UNIFESP, 2024);
11. Fluminense Federal University (UFF, 2024);
12. Federal Rural University of Rio de Janeiro (UFRRJ, 2024);
13. University of Brasília (UnB, 2024);
14. Federal University of Goiás (UFG, 2024);
15. Federal University of the Delta of Parnaíba (Piauí, UFDPar, 2024);
16. Federal University of São João del-Rei (MG, UFSJ, 2024);
17. Federal University of the State of Rio de Janeiro (UNIRIO, 2024);
18. Federal University of Western Pará (UFOPA, 2024);
19. Federal University of Recôncavo da Bahia (UFRB, 2024);
20. Federal Rural University of the Amazon (UFRA, 2024);
21. Federal University of Catalão (UFCAT, GO, 2024);
22. Federal University of São Carlos (UFSCar, 2025);
23. Federal University of Agreste of Pernambuco (UFAPE, 2025);
24. Federal University of Southern and Southeastern Pará (UNIFESSPA, 2021–2025);
25. Federal University of Rio de Janeiro (UFRJ, 2025);
26. Federal University of Alagoas (UFAL, 2025);
27. Federal University of Sergipe (UFS, 2025);
28. Federal University of Ceará (UFC, 2025);
29. Federal University of Pará (UFPA, 2026);
30. Federal University of Minas Gerais (UFMG, 2026).

State universities

1. State University of Bahia (UNEB, 2018);
2. State University of Amapá (UEAP, 2019);
3. State University of Feira de Santana (UEFS, 2019);
4. State University of Paraíba (UEPB, 2021);
5. Southwest Bahia State University (UESB, 2023);
6. Campinas State University (UNICAMP, 2025);
7. Minas Gerais State University (UEMG, 2025);
8. Northern Rio de Janeiro State University Darcy Ribeiro (UENF, 2025).

== Public service examinations ==
The adoption of quotas for transgender and travesti people in Brazilian public service entrance examinations has also taken place at an institutional and sectoral level. For example, the Public Defender's Office of the State of São Paulo established, in 2022, a system reserving 2% of vacancies in its public recruitment examinations for transgender and travesti candidates, following a decision by the institution's Superior Council published in the official gazette. The policy is based on self-declaration and applies to internal recruitment processes and career examinations. The Public Prosecutor's Office of Labor (MPT) issued the CSMPT Resolution 198/2022, which establishes rules on the competition for entry into the career, with the reservation of vacancies for transgender people.

Plenary of the National Council of Justice (CNJ) created 2023 resolution of reservation of job quotas in courts for women in vulnerability, allocated primarily to Black and Brown women, in conditions of special economic and social vulnerability, former prisoners, migrants and refugees, homeless, indigenous people, rural women, as well as trans people and travestis.

The Federal Public Defender's Office (DPU), through Resolution CSDPU 222/2024, reserved the percentage of 2% of the vacancies. The Public Defender's Office of the State of Goiás (DPE-GO) and the Public Defender's Office of the State of Mato Grosso (DPE-MT) debates the issue. And in 2023, Public Defender's Office of Paraná released quotas for transgender and non-binary people.

The Court of Justice of Piauí (TJPI) established quotas, in February 2026, for women (cis, trans, and travesti) who are victims of domestic violence. The Superior Labor Court (TST) also instituted quotas in January 2026 for women (cis, trans, and travesti) in vulnerable situations. Also in January 2026, there had the approval and implementation of trans quotas (in general) in the Public Prosecutor's Office of Acre (MPAC).

The Public Prosecutor's Office of Paraíba (MPPB) has instituted, in 2026, quotas for women and women with gender identities in vulnerable situations (cis, trans, and travesti).

The State of Rio Grande do Sul approved transgender quotas in public service exams for its state agencies, offering transgender quotas in the Porto Alegre City Hall, which also approved transgender quotas in the municipality as of 2025, and in the São Lourenço do Sul City Hall since 2026, with transgender quotas for public service exams in the municipality.
