= List of medical schools in South America =

The following is a list of medical schools (or universities with a medical school) in South America.

== Argentina ==
- Medical School of the Austral University
- Medical School of the Pontifical Catholic University of Argentina
- Medical School of the Fundación H. A. Barceló
- Medical School of the Catholic University of Cordoba
- Medical School of the Interamerican Open University
- Medical School of the Instituto Universitario CEMIC
- Medical School of the National University of Comahue
- Medical School of the National University of La Matanza
- Medical School of the National University of Córdoba
- Medical School of the National University of Cuyo
- Medical School of the National University Arturo Jauretche
- Medical School of the National University of Entre Ríos
- Medical School of the National University of Formosa
- Medical School of the National University of the Litoral
- Medical School of the National University of the Northeast
- Medical School of the National University of Salta
- Medical School of the National University of the South
- Medical School of the National University of Tucumán
- Medical School of the River Plate Adventist University
- Medical School of the Universidad de Maimónides
- Medical School of the Universidad de Morón
- Medical School of the Universidad del Salvador
- Medical School of the Universidad Favaloro
- Medical School of the Universidad Nacional de La Plata
- Medical School of the National University of Mar del Plata
- Medical School of the University of Buenos Aires
- Medical School of the University of Mendoza
- Medical School of the University of Rosario
- Medical School of the University of Tucumán

== Bolivia ==
- Faculty of Medicine of the Universidad Autónoma Tomás Frías
- Universidad de Aquino de Bolivia
- Faculty of Medicine of the Universidad Católica Boliviana San Pablo
- Faculty of Medicine of the Universidad Católica Boliviana San Pablo, Santa Cruz
- Faculty of Medicine of the Universidad Mayor de San Andrés, La Paz
- Faculty of Medicine of the Universidad Mayor de San Simon, Cochabamba
- Faculty of Medicine of the Universidad Nuestra Señora de La Paz
- Faculty of Medicine of the Universidad Privada del Valle, Cochabamba
- Faculty of Science of Human Heath of Universidad Autónoma Gabriel Rene Moreno, Santa Cruz.

== Brazil ==
There are 259 medical schools in Brazil. The country has the second highest number of medical schools in the world, surpassed only by India which has 341 schools.

=== Brasília - Federal District ===
- Course of Medicine, Catholic University of Brasília, Brasília
- Faculty of Medicine of the Central Planalt, Uniplac, Brasília
- Faculty of Medicine of the University of Brasília, Brasília
- Medical Course, Escola Superior de Ciências da Saúde, Brasília

=== Rio de Janeiro State ===
- Course of Medicine, Faculty of Biological and Health Sciences, Universidade de Nova Iguaçu, Itaperuna campus
- Course of Medicine, Faculty of Biological and Health Sciences, Universidade de Nova Iguaçu, Nova Iguaçu campus
- Course of Medicine of the Universidade Estácio de Sá, Rio de Janeiro
- Faculty of Medicine of Campos dos Goitacazes
- Faculty of Medicine of the Fluminense Federal University
- Faculty of Medicine of the Federal University of Rio de Janeiro
- Faculty of Medicine of Federal University of Rio de Janeiro State
- Faculty of Medicine of Teresópolis
- Faculty of Medicine of the Universidade Gama Filho
- Faculty of Medicine of Valença
- Faculty of Medicine of Vassouras
- Institute of Medical Sciences, Rio de Janeiro State University
- Petrópolis Medical School
- Medical School of the Universidade do Grande Rio (UNIGRANRIO)
- Medical School of the Universidade Souza Marques, Rio de Janeiro
- School of Medical Sciences of Volta Redonda

=== São Paulo State ===
- Course of Medicine, Universidade de Mogi das Cruzes, Mogi das Cruzes
- Department of Medicine of the Federal University of São Carlos, São Carlos
- Faculty of Medical Sciences of the Pontifical Catholic University of Campinas
- Faculty of Medical Sciences of Santa Casa de São Paulo, São Paulo City
- Faculty of Medical Sciences of the State University of Campinas, Campinas
- Faculty of Medical Sciences of the Universidade São Francisco, Bragança Paulista
- Faculty of Medicine of ABC, Santo André
- Faculty of Medicine of Botucatu of the State University of São Paulo (UNESP)
- Faculty of Medicine of Catanduva (FAMECA)
- Faculty of Medicine of the Centro Universitário Barão de Mauá, Ribeirão Preto
- Faculty of Medicine of Fernandópolis
- Faculty of Medicine of Jundiai
- Faculty of Medicine of Marília
- Faculty of Medicine of the Metropolitan University of Santos
- Faculty of Medicine of Ribeirão Preto of the University of São Paulo, Ribeirão Preto
- Faculty of Medicine of São José do Rio Preto (Famerp)
- Faculty of Medicine of Sorocaba of the Pontifical Catholic University of São Paulo
- Faculty of Medicine of Taubaté
- Faculty of Medicine of the Universidade de Marília
- Faculty of Medicine of the Universidade de Ribeirão Preto (UNAERP)
- Faculty of Medicine of the Universidade Nove de Julho, São Paulo City
- Faculty of Medicine of University of Santo Amaro, São Paulo City
- Faculty of Medicine of the University of São Paulo, São Paulo City
- Medical Course of the Centro Universitario Lusíada, Santos
- Medical Faculty of the Universidade do Oeste Paulista, Presidente Prudente
- School of Medicine of Federal University of São Paulo, São Paulo City

=== Minas Gerais State ===
- Course of Medicine, State University of Montes Claros (UNIMONTES)
- Faculty of Medical Sciences of Alfenas
- Faculty of Medical Sciences of Itajubá
- Faculty of Medical Sciences of Minas Gerais, Belo Horizonte
- Faculty of Medicine of Barbacena
- Faculty of Medicine of Caratinga
- Faculty of Medicine of the Federal University of Juiz de Fora
- Faculty of Medicine of the Federal University of Minas Gerais, Belo Horizonte
- Faculty of Medicine of the Federal University of Uberlândia
- Faculty of Medicine of Ipatinga
- Faculty of Medicine of Patos de Minas
- Faculty of Medicine of Pouso Alegre
- Faculty of Medicine of Triângulo Mineiro, Uberaba
- Medical Course of the University of Uberaba

=== Espírito Santo State ===
- Faculty of Medicine of Federal University of Espírito Santo, Vitória, Espírito Santo
- Faculty of Medicine of UNESC, Colatina, Espírito Santo
- Faculty of Medicine of University of Vila Velha
- Medical School of Santa Casa de Misericórdia of Vitória, Espírito Santo

=== Rio Grande do Sul State ===
- Course of Medicine of the Lutheran University of Brazil, Canoas, Rio Grande do Sul
- Faculty of Medicine, Federal University of Rio Grande, Rio Grande, Rio Grande do Sul
- Faculty of Medicine of the Federal University of Rio Grande do Sul, Porto Alegre, Rio Grande do Sul
- Faculty of Medicine of the Pontifical Catholic University of Rio Grande do Sul, Porto Alegre, Rio Grande do Sul
- Faculty of Medicine of the Universidade de Passo Fundo, Rio Grande do Sul
- Faculty of Medicine of the Universidade Federal de Ciências da Saúde de Porto Alegre
- Faculty of Medicine of the University of Caxias do Sul, Rio Grande do Sul
- Medical Course, Federal University of Pelotas, Pelotas, Rio Grande do Sul
- Medical Course, Federal University of Santa Maria, Santa Maria, Rio Grande do Sul
- Medical School of the Universidade Católica de Pelotas
- Faculty of Medicine of Universidade do Vale do Rio dos Sinos, São Leopoldo, Rio Grande do Sul

=== Santa Catarina State ===
- Course of Medicine, Universidade Comunitária Regional de Chapecó (UNOCHAPECÓ) Chapecó
- Course of Medicine, Universidade da Região de Joinville
- Course of Medicine, Universidade do Extremo Sul Catarinense (UNESC), Criciúma
- Course of Medicine, Universidade do Sul de Santa Catarina (UNISUL), Tubarão
- Course of Medicine, Universidade do Vale do Itajaí
- Faculty of Medicine of the Regional University of Blumenau
- Medical Course of the Federal University of Santa Catarina, Florianópolis

=== Paraná State ===
- Course of Medicine of the Federal University of Paraná, Curitiba
- Course of Medicine of the State University of Maringá, Maringá
- Course of Medicine of the University Center Fundação Assiz Gurgacz, Cascavel
- Course of Medicine of the State University of West Paraná (UNIOESTE), Cascavel
- Evangelical Faculty of Medicine of Paraná (FEPAR), Curitiba
- Faculty of Medicine, Pontifical Catholic University of Paraná, Curitiba
- Faculty of Medicine, State University of Londrina, Londrina

=== North States ===
- Belém Medical School, State University of Pará (UEPA), Belém
- Course of Medicine, Federal University of Acre (UFAC), Rio Branco, Acre
- Course of Medicine, Federal University of Roraima, Boa Vista, Roraima
- Course of Medicine, State University of Amazonas, Manaus, Amazonas
- Faculty of Medicine, Centro Universitário Nilton Lins, Manaus, Amazonas
- Faculty of Medicine, Federal University of Pará, Belém
- Faculty of Medicine, Federal University of Tocantins, Palmas, Tocantins
- Faculty of Medicine, ITPAC, Araguaina, Tocantins
- Faculty of Medicine, ITPAC, Porto Nacional, Tocantins
- Faculty of Medicine of the Federal University of Amazonas, Manaus, Amazonas
- Faculty of Medicine of the Regional University of Gurupi, Gurupi, Tocantins
- Faculty of Medicine, University of Rondônia, Porto Velho, Rondônia
- Marabá Medical School, State University of Pará (UEPA), Marabá
- Medical Course, Centro Universitário do Pará, Belém
- Santarém Medical School, State University of Pará (UEPA), Santarém

=== Northeastern States ===
- Bahia School of Medicine and Public Health, Salvador, Bahia
- Centro universitário Christus (UniChristus), Fortaleza, Ceará
- Department of Medicine, Federal University of Sergipe, Aracaju, Sergipe
- Escola Pernambucana de Medicina, Recife, Pernambuco ()
- Faculty of Medical Sciences of the University of Pernambuco, Recife, Pernambuco
- Faculty of Medicine Nova Esperança FAMENE, João Pessoa, Paraíba
- Faculty of Medicine of the Federal University of Alagoas, Maceió, Alagoas
- Faculty of Medicine of Bahia of the Federal University of Bahia, Salvador, Bahia
- Faculty of Medicine the Federal University of Ceará, Barbalha, Ceará
- Faculty of Medicine of the Federal University of Ceará, Fortaleza campus, Ceará
- Faculty of Medicine of the Federal University of Ceará, Sobral, Ceará
- Faculty of Medicine of the Federal University of Maranhão, São Luís, Maranhão
- Faculty of Medicine of the Federal University of Paraíba, João Pessoa, Paraíba
- Faculty of Medicine of the Federal University of Pernambuco, Recife, Pernambuco
- Faculty of Medicine of the Federal University of Piauí, Teresina, Piauí
- Faculty of Medicine of the Federal University of Rio Grande do Norte, Natal, Rio Grande do Norte
- Faculty of Medicine of Juazeiro do Norte, Ceará
- Faculty of Medicine of the State University of Feira de Santana, Feira de Santana, Bahia
- Faculty of Medical Sciences of the State University of Piauí (UESPI), Teresina, Piauí
- Faculty of Medicine of the State University of Santa Cruz, Ilhéus, Bahia
- Faculty of Medicine of the State University of Southeast of Bahia, Vitória da Conquista, Bahia
- Medical Course of the Federal University of Campina Grande, Campina Grande, Paraíba
- Nucleus of Life Sciences of the Federal University of Pernambuco, Caruaru, Pernambuco
- School of Medical Sciences of Alagoas, Maceió, Alagoas
- School of Medicine of the State University of Ceará, Fortaleza, Ceará
- University of Fortaleza, Unifor, Fortaleza, Ceará

=== Center-Western States ===
- Course of Medicine of the Federal University of Mato Grosso do Sul, Campo Grande, Mato Grosso do Sul
- Faculty of Medicine of Campos Dourados of the Federal University of Mato Grosso do Sul, Mato Grosso do Sul
- Faculty of Medicine of the Federal University of Goiás, Goiânia
- Faculty of Medical Sciences of the Federal University of Mato Grosso, Cuiabá, Mato Grosso
- Faculty of Medicine of the Pontifical Catholic University of Goiás, Goiânia
- Faculty of Medicine of the Universidade para o Desenvolvimento do Estado e da Região do Pantanal (UNIDERP), Campo Grande
- Faculty of Medicine of the University of Cuiabá (UNIC), Cuiabá

== Chile ==
- Pontificia Universidad Católica de Chile
- Universidad Austral de Chile
- Universidad Católica de la Santísima Concepción
- Universidad de los Andes
- Universidad de Antofagasta
- Universidad de Chile
- Universidad de Concepción
- Universidad de La Frontera
- Universidad de Santiago de Chile
- Universidad de Valparaíso
- Universidad del Desarrollo
- Universidad Diego Portales
- Universidad Finis Terrae
- Universidad Mayor
- Universidad Nacional Andrés Bello
- Universidad San Sebastián
- Universidad Autonoma de Chile

== Colombia ==
- Colegio Mayor de Nuestra Senora del Rosario, Facultad de Medicina, Bogotá
- Universidad de Nariño, Facultad de Ciencias de la Salud, Pasto, Nariño
- Escuela de Medicina Juan N. Corpas, Bogotá
- Fundación Universitaria de Boyacá, Facultad de Medicina, Tunja, Boyacá
- Fundación Universitaria de Ciencias de la Salud (FUCS), Bogotá
- Fundación Universitaria San Martín, Facultad de Medicina, Santa Fé de Bogotá
- Pontificia Universidad Javeriana Facultad de Medicina, Santa fé de Bogotá
- Universidad Antonio Nariño, Facultad de Medicina, Santa fé de Bogotá
- Universidad Autónoma de Bucaramanga, Facultad de Medicina, Campus el Bosque, Bucaramanga, Santander
- Universidad CES, Facultad de Medicina, Medellín, Antioquia
- Universidad de los Andes, Facultad de Medicina, Santa Fé de Bogotá
- Universidad de Antioquia, Facultad de Medicina, Medellín, Antioquia
- Universidad de Caldas, Facultad de Ciencias de la Salud, Medicina, Manizale, Caldas
- Universidad de Cartagena, Facultad de Medicina, Bolivar
- Universidad de Ciencias Aplicadas y Ambientales (UDCA), Facultad de Ciencias de la Salud, Campus Universitario, Santa Fé de Bogotá
- Universidad de la Sabana, Facultad de Medicina, Chía, Cundinamarca
- Universidad de Santander (UDES), Facultad de Medicina, Bucaramanga, Santander
- Universidad del Bosque, Escuela Colombiana de Medicina, Santa Fé de Bogotá
- Universidad del Cauca, Facultad de Ciencias de la Salud - Medicina, Popayán, Cauca
- Universidad del Norte, Ciencias de la Salud - Facultad de Medicina, Barranquilla
- Universidad del Quindío, Facultad de Ciencias de la Salud - Medicina, Armenia, Quindío
- Universidad del Sinú, Escuela de Medicina, Bolìvar
- Universidad del Tolima, Facultad de Medicina, Ibagué, Tolima
- Universidad del Valle, Facultad de Salud, Escuela de Medicina, Cali, Valle
- Universidad Icesi, Cali, Valle
- Universidad Industrial de Santander, Bucaramanga, Santander
- Universidad Industrial de Santander, Escuela de Medicina, Facultad de Salud, Bucaramanga, Santander
- Universidad Libre de Colombia, Seccional Atlántico, Facultad de Medicina, Barranquilla, Atlántico
- Universidad Libre de Colombia, Seccional Cali, Facultad de Medicina y Ciencias de la Salud, Cali, Valle
- Universidad Metropolitana, Ciencias de la Salud, Barranquilla, Atlántico
- Universidad Militar Nueva Granada, Facultad de Medicina y Ciencias de la Salud, Santa Fé de Bogotá
- Universidad Nacional de Colombia, Facultad de Medicina, Ciudad Universitaria, Santa Fé de Bogotá
- Universidad Pedagogica y Tecnologica de Colombia, Facultad de Ciencias de la Salud - Escuela de Medicina, Tunja - Boyacá
- Universidad Pontificia Bolivariana, Facultad de Medicina, Medellín, Antioquia
- Universidad Surcolombiana, Facultad de Ciencias de la Salud, Facultad de Medicina, Neiva, Huila
- Universidad Tecnologica de Pereira, Facultad Ciencias de la Salud, Pereira, Risaralda
- Universidad Sanitas De Colombia (Unisanitas), Facultad de ciencias de la Salud, Bogota, Colombia.

== Ecuador ==
- Facultad de Ciencias de la Salud Eugenio Espejo, Quito
- Faculty of Medicine, Central University of Ecuador, Quito
- Faculty of Medicine, Pontificia Universidad Católica del Ecuador, Quito
- Faculty of Medicine, La Universidad de Guayaquil, Guayaquil
- School of medicine, Universidad Técnica de Machala, Machala.
- Faculty of Medicine, Universidad Espíritu Santo, Guayaquil
- Faculty of Medicine, Universidad Estatal de Cuenca, Cuenca
- Medical School, Universidad San Francisco de Quito, Quito
- Faculty of Medicine, Universidad Católica de Santiago de Guayaquil, Guayaquil, Ecuador
- Faculty of Medicine, Universidad de Las Américas, Quito, Ecuador
- Faculty of Medicine, Universidad Laica Eloy Alfaro de Manabí, Ecuador.:

== Guyana ==
- American International School of Medicine
- Georgetown American University
- GreenHeart Medical University
- Rajiv Gandhi University of Science and Technology
- Texila American University
- University of Guyana

== Paraguay ==
- Universidad Maria Auxiliadora de San Estanislao "UMAX SANTANI", Santani
- Universidad Católica "Nuestra Señora de la Asunción", Villarrica
- Universidad Nacional de Asunción, Facultad de Ciencias Medicas, Asunción
- Universidad Nacional de Itapua, Facultad de Medicina, Encarnacion
- Universidad Nacional de Caaguazú, Facultad de Ciencias Médicas, Coronel Oviedo
- Universidad Nacional de Concepción, Facultad de Medicina, Concepción
- Universidad Central Del Paraguay, Facultad de Ciencias de la Salud, Pedro Juan Caballero

== Peru ==
- Faculty of Medicine "Alberto Hurtado" of the Universidad Peruana Cayetano Heredia, Lima
- Faculty of Medicine "Hipólito Unanue" of the Universidad Nacional Federico Villarreal, Lima
- Faculty of Medicine of Universidad Nacional de San Agustin, Arequipa
- Faculty of Medicine "San Fernando" of the Universidad Nacional Mayor de San Marcos, Lima
- Faculty of Medicine of Universidad Peruana Unión, Lima
- Faculty of Medicine of Scientific University of the South, Lima
- Faculty of Medicine of Catholic University of Santa María, Arequipa
- Faculty of Medicine of Universidad Cesar Vallejo, Trujillo
- Faculty of Medicine of Universidad Nacional de Trujillo, Trujillo
- Faculty of Medicine of Universidad Nacional del Altiplano, Puno
- Faculty of Medicine of Universidad Particular de Chiclayo, Lambayeque
- Faculty of Medicine of Universidad Privada San Juan Bautista, Lima
- Faculty of Medicine of Universidad Ricardo Palma, Lima
- Faculty of Medicine of University of San Martín de Porres, Lima
- Faculty of Medicine of Universidad Peruana de Ciencias Aplicadas, Lima
- Faculty of Medicine of University of Piura, Lima

== Uruguay ==
- University of the Republic, Manuel Quintela's Hospital
- CLAEH Faculty of Medicine, Punta del Este

== Venezuela ==
- Faculty of medicine of the Central University of Venezuela at Caracas
- Faculty of medicine of the University of The Andes at Merida
- Faculty of medicine of the University of The Andes at San Cristobal
- Faculty of medicine of the University of Zulia at Maracaibo
- Faculty of medicine of the University of Carabobo at Valencia
- Faculty of medicine of the University of Carabobo at Maracay
- Faculty of medicine of the University of Oriente at Anzoategui
- Faculty of medicine of the University of Oriente at Ciudad Bolivar
- Faculty of medicine of the Universidad Centro Occidental Lisandro Alvarado at Barquisimeto
- Faculty of medicine of the Universidad Nacional Experimental Francisco de Miranda at Coro
- Faculty of medicine of the Universidad Nacional Experimental de los Llanos Centrales Rómulo Gallegos at San Juan de los Morros
- Faculty of medicine of the Universidad Nacional Experimental de los Llanos Centrales Rómulo Gallegos at Valle de la Pascua
- Faculty of medicine of the Universidad Nacional Experimental de los Llanos Centrales Rómulo Gallegos at Calabozo
- Faculty of medicine of the Universidad de las Ciencias de la Salud Hugo Chávez Frías at Caracas
