= North Region, Brazil =

Region of Brazil

North Region Região Norte
- Region
- Coordinates: 3°7′45″S 60°1′17″W
- Country: Brazil
- Largest cities: Manaus; Belém
- States: Acre, Amapá, Amazonas, Pará, Rondônia, Roraima, and Tocantins

Area
  - Region: 3,853,676.9 km^{2} (1,487,913.0 sq mi)
  - Rank: 1st

Population
  - Region: 17,354,884
  - Rank: 4th
  - Density: 4.5034611/km^{2} (11.663911/sq mi)
  - Rank: 5th
  - Urban: 75.6%

GDP
  - Total: R$ 564.064 billion (US$ 104.634 billion)

HDI
  - Year: 2014
  - Category: 0.730 – high (4th)
  - Life expectancy: 71 years (4th)
  - Infant mortality: 25.8 per 1,000 (2nd)
  - Literacy: 91.8% (4th)
- Time zones: UTC−03:00 (BRT)
- UTC−04:00 (AMT)
- UTC−05:00 (ACT)

The North Region of Brazil (Portuguese: Região Norte do Brasil [ʁeʒiˈɐ̃w ˈnɔʁtʃi du bɾaˈziw]) is the largest region of Brazil, accounting for 45.27% of the national territory. It has the second-lowest population of any region in the country, and accounts for a minor percentage of the national GDP. The region is slightly larger than India and slightly smaller than the whole European Union. It comprises the states of Acre, Amapá, Amazonas, Pará, Rondônia, Roraima, and Tocantins.

It has the lowest population density out of all the regions of Brazil, with only 4.5 inhabitants per km^{2}. Most of the population is centered in urban areas.

Belém International Airport and Manaus International Airport connect the North Region with many Brazilian cities and also operate some international flights. The region is home to the Federal University of Amazonas and the Federal University of Pará, among others.

== History ==
The first inhabitants of the North Region, as in the rest of Brazil, were the Native Brazilians, who shared a diverse number of tribes and villages, from the pre-Columbian period until the arrival of the European people.

The Spaniards, among them Francisco de Orellana, organized exploratory expeditions by the Amazon River to know the region. After long journeys alongside Francisco de Orellana, Gonzalo Fernández de Oviedo y Valdés wrote a letter addressed to Cardinal Pedro Bembo in Venice, extolling the fauna and flora existing in the region at the time of the expedition.

The 17th century marked the arrival of the Portuguese people, where they built military strongholds to defend the region against the invasion of other peoples, in 1616, causing in the foundation of Belém do Pará. The richness of the Amazon Rainforest has also become interesting for the Portuguese Crown. With the Portuguese explorers, the Catholic missionaries came to the region, in order to catechize the natives. The natives were assembled by missionaries in villages, called missions, many of which gave birth to several cities, such as Borba and Óbidos.

Some of the Region's oldest towns: Bragança, Xapuri, Tefé, Natividade and Amapá. In order to work on rubber extraction, Brazilians from other states, mainly from the Northeast Region, moved to the region. Also many Japanese families came to work in the agricultural colonies.

During the 1960s, 1970s and 1980s, military governments implemented a major plan to integrate the region with other regions of Brazil, including the construction of several highways (such as the BR-010), the installation of industries and the creation of the Free Economic Zone of Manaus.

=== Settlement ===
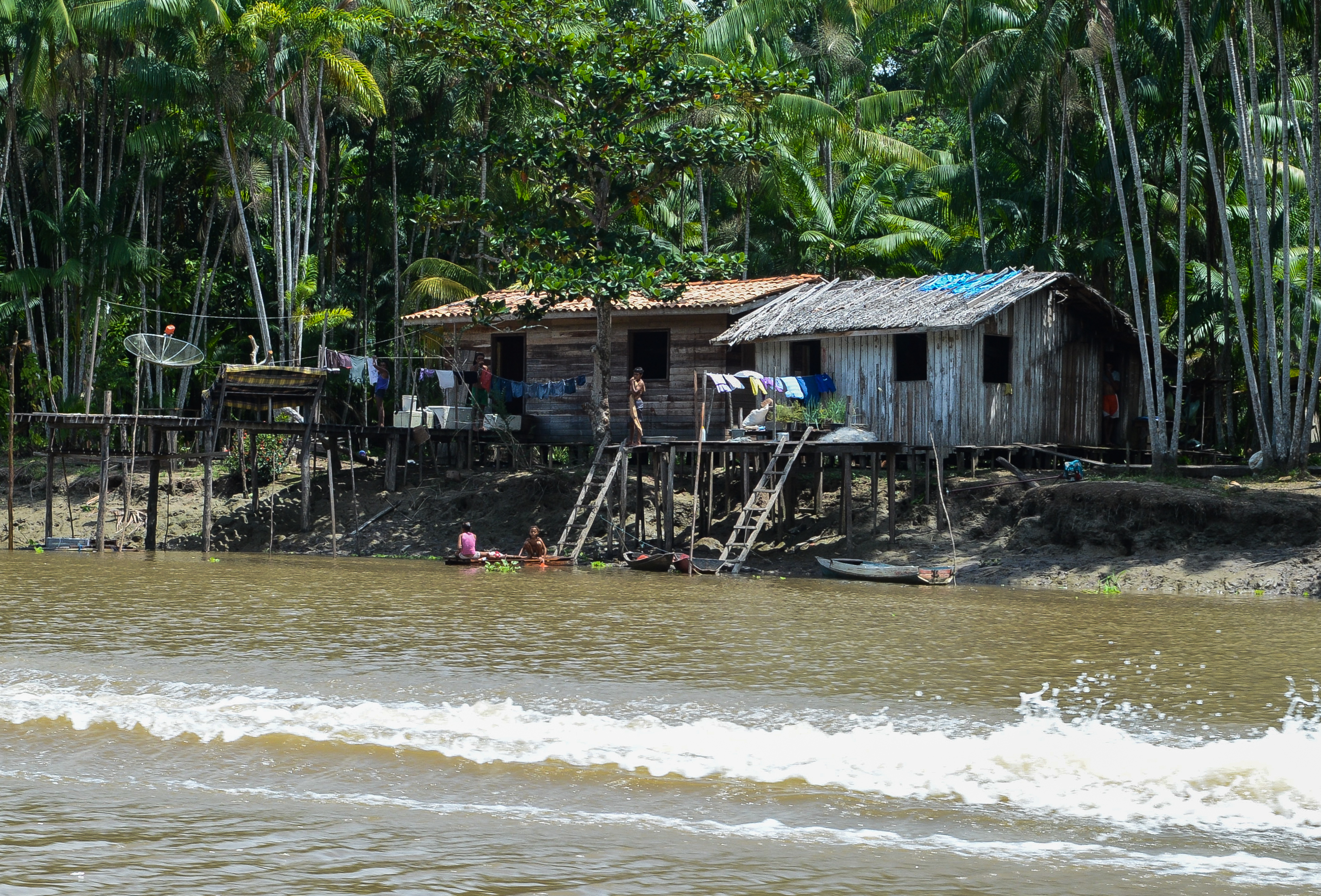
Houses of ribeirinhos in the state of Pará.

The territorial division into countries does not necessarily coincide with the indigenous occupation of the geographical space; in many cases, there are people living on both sides of international borders, which were created long after they were already in the region.

From the beginning of the colonization from the 17th century to the present day, the inhabitants of Amazônia dedicated themselves to extractive and mercantilist activities, inserting between 1840 and 1910 the monopoly of rubber, mainly in Amazonas and Acre. All this process of colonization has brought about changes such as the reduction of the indigenous population, the increase of the Caboclo identity, the mixing of whites, blacks and indigenous people, the reduction of species of plants and animals and other consequences.

After World War II, the Brazilian Amazon became part of the national development process. The creation of the National Institute of Amazonian Research (INPA) in 1952, the establishment of regional development agencies such as the Superintendency of Development for the Amazon (SUDAM) in 1966 and the Free Economic Zone of Manaus in 1967 began to contribute to the settlement of region and in the execution of projects focused on the region.

== Geography ==
Climate classification for Northern Brazil.

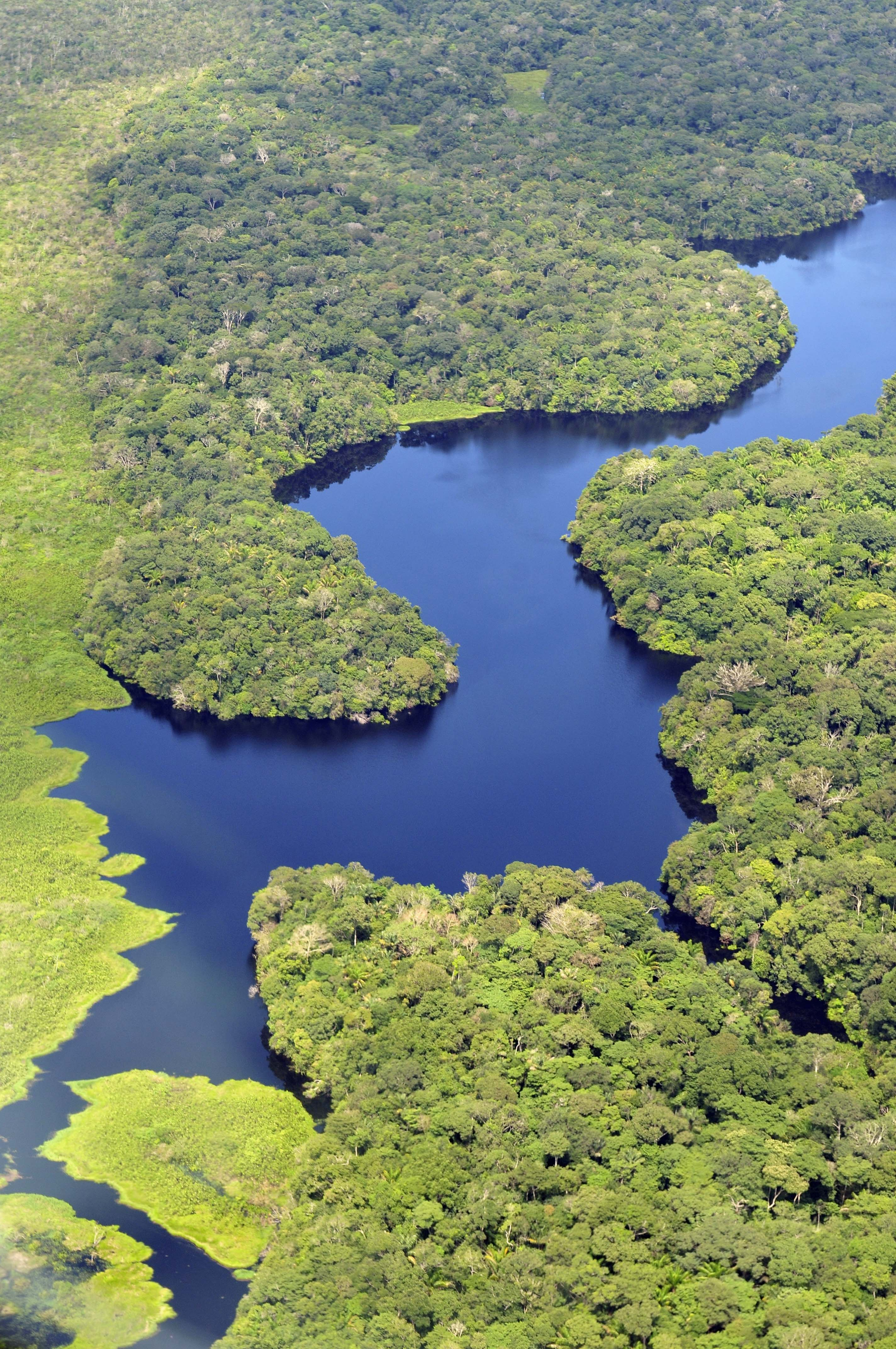
Amazon rainforest, Northern Brazil

The Amazon represents over half of the planet's remaining rainforests and comprises the largest and most species-rich tract of tropical rainforest in the world. Wet tropical forests are the most species-rich biome, and tropical forests in the Americas are consistently more species rich than the wet forests in Africa and Asia. As the largest tract of tropical rainforest in the Americas, the Amazonian rainforests have unparalleled biodiversity. More than 1/3 of all species in the world live in the Amazon Rainforest. The region is home to about 2.5 million insect species, tens of thousands of plants, and some 2000 birds and mammals species. To date, at least 40,000 plant species, 3,000 fish, 1,294 birds, 427 mammals, 428 amphibians, and 378 reptiles have been scientifically classified in the region. Scientists have described between 96,660 and 128,843 invertebrate species in Brazil alone.

The diversity of plant species is the highest on earth with some experts estimating that one square kilometre may contain over 75,000 types of trees and 150,000 species of higher plants. One square kilometre of Amazon rainforest can contain about 90,790 tonnes of living plants. This constitutes the largest collection of living plants and animal species in the world. One in five of all the birds in the world live in the rainforests of the Amazon. To date, an estimated 438,000 species of plants of economic and social interest have been registered in the region with many more remaining to be discovered or catalogue

Some latitudes can create a region with hot and humid climates. The existence of heat and the enormous liquid mass favor evaporation and make the region a very humid area.

Dominated by an equatorial climate, the region presents high temperatures throughout the year (averages from 24 °C to 26 °C), a low thermal amplitude, with the exception of some areas of the states of Amazonas, Rondônia and Acre, where the phenomenon of "friagem" occurs, due to La Niña's activity, allowing cold air masses coming from the South Atlantic Ocean to penetrate the states of the South Region of the country, pass through the Central-West region and reach the Amazonian states, causing rapidly falling temperature.

The Amazonian heat provides an area of low latitude that attracts masses of polar air. Occurring in winter, the effect of "friagem" lasts a week or so.

== Political Subdivisions ==
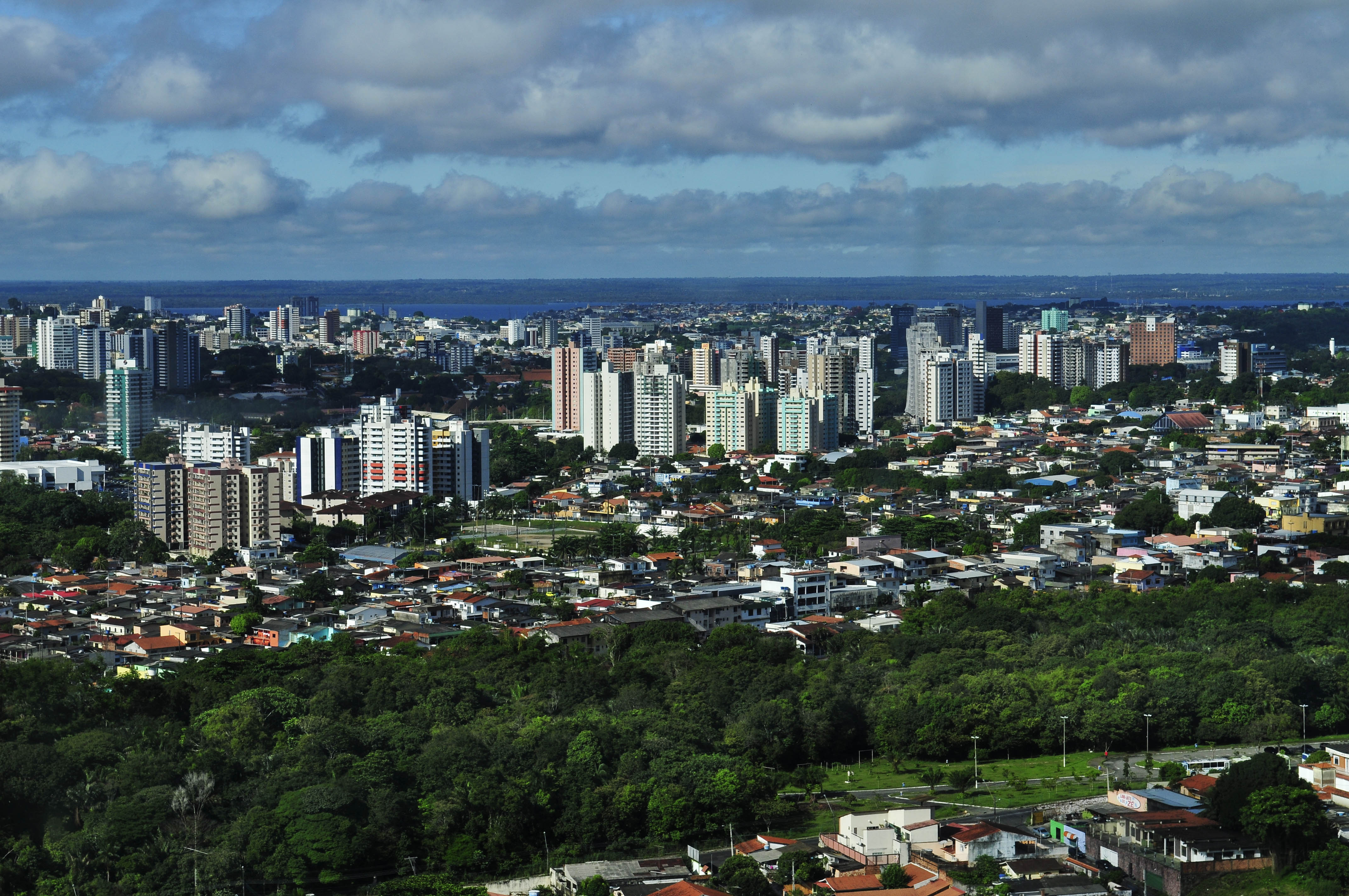
Manaus is the most populous city of the North region.

City	Population (2022)
Manaus	2,063,689
Belém	1,303,403
Ananindeua	478,778
Porto Velho	460,434
Macapá	442,933
Boa Vista	413,486
Rio Branco	364,756
Santarém	331,937
Palmas	302,692

== Culture ==
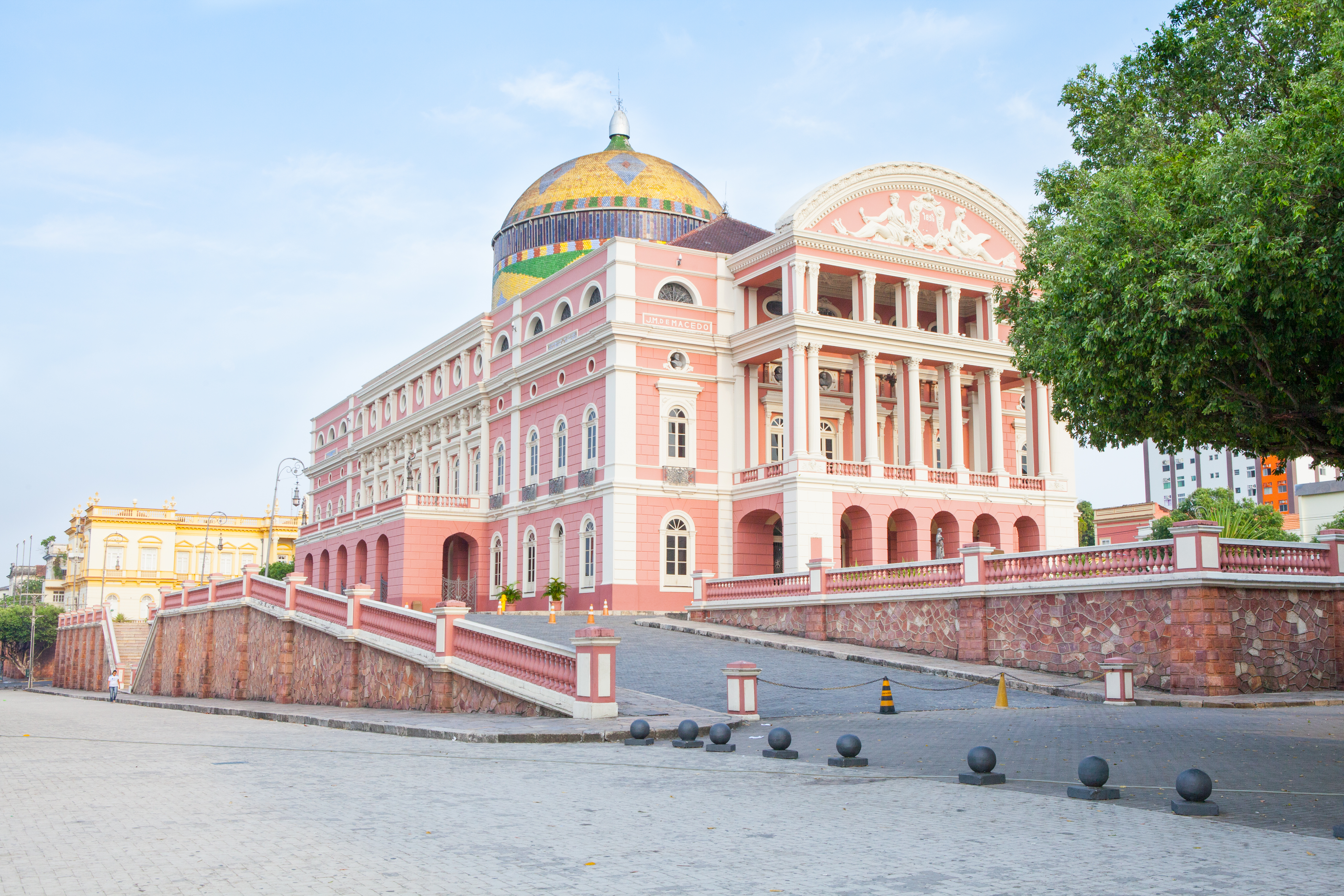
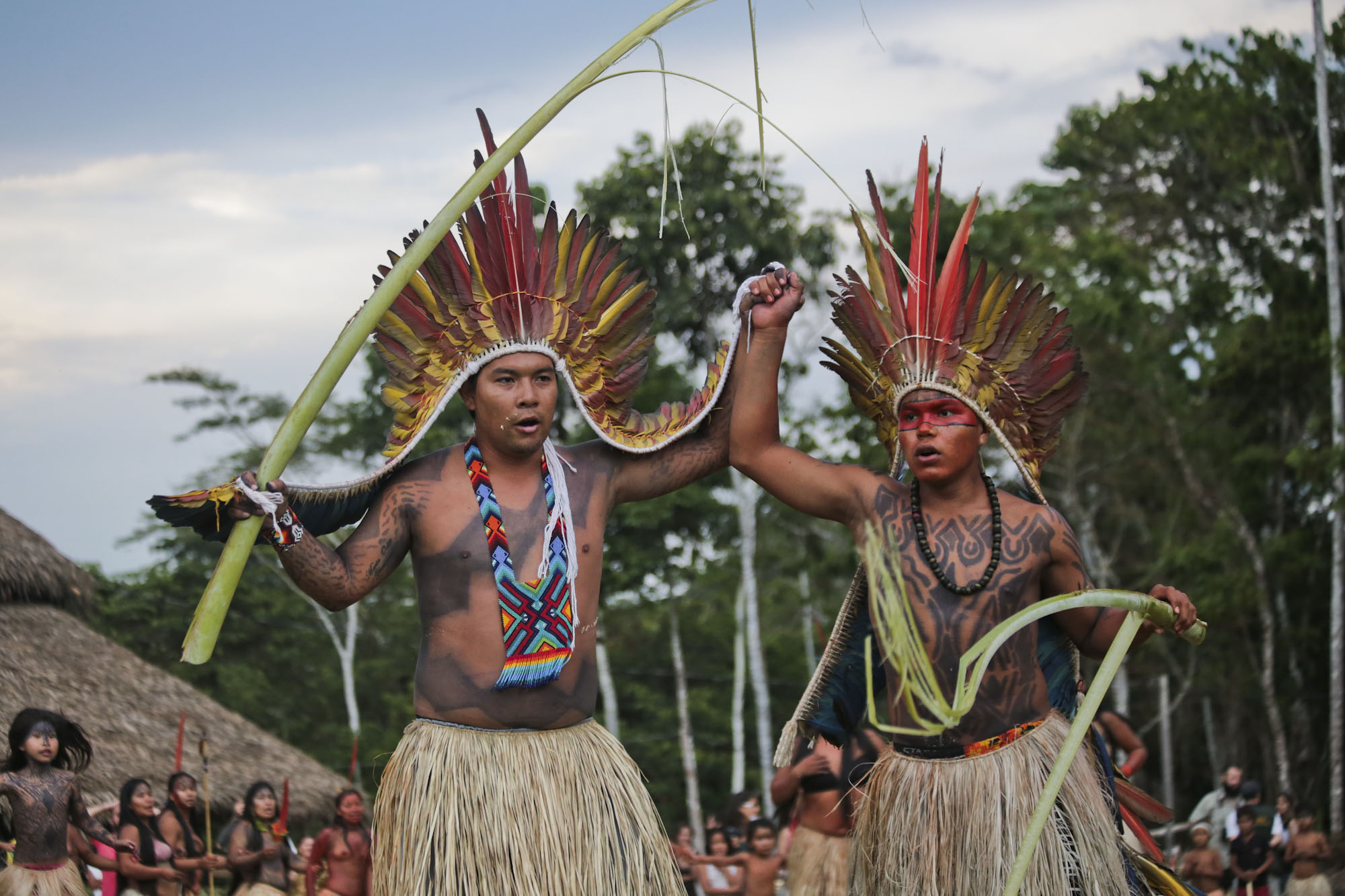

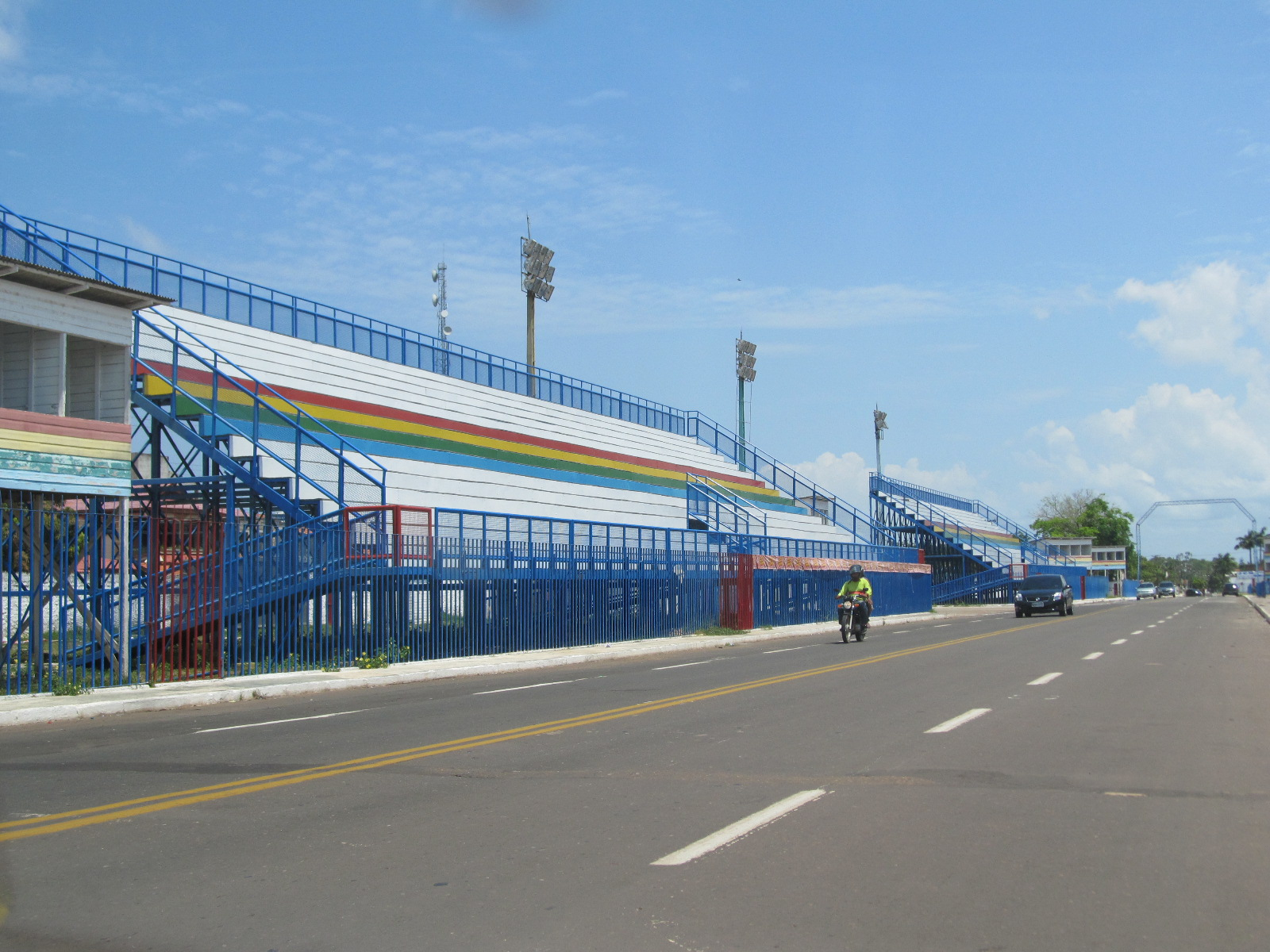
Amazon Theatre, Manaus (up). Yawa Festival, Tarauacá (middle). Sambadrome of Macapá (down).

With its own folklore, the main attractions are the Parintins Folklore Festival, Círio de Nazaré in Belém, Rio Branco and Macapá; Sairé Festival, in Santarém, ExpoAcre (the largest in the North region) and typical dances, Marujada, Carimbó, Brazilian Calypso, Tecno brega and Cirandas such as Samba lelê and others.

In the region, there are theaters and palaces in Brazil: The Amazon Theatre, located in Manaus, Palácio Rio Branco, in Rio Branco, Palácio Senador Hélio Campos, in Boa Vista, Teatro das Bacabeiras, in Macapá and the Peace Theatre, located in Belém. The gastronomic culture of the northern region of Brazil, has Indigenous, African and Portuguese roots, in addition to other influences from both within Brazil and other cultures outside the country, the strong Amazonian indigenous influence in its main dishes, among the main highlights are delicacies such as duck in tucupi sauce, maniçoba, tacacá and a menu of a wide variety of species of Amazonian fish, such as pirarucu, tambaqui, jaú, piramutaba, among other species; a huge menu of fruits, such as the local açaí, pupunha, tucumã, cupuaçu, buriti, abiu, urucu, Malay apple, cumaru, guaraná, and ingá, among other fruits. The whole region has a variety of ingredients, but also foods based on cassava such as water flour, uarini flour, tapioca flour, tapioca gum, tucupi, among others.

== Ethnic groups ==
The population of northern Brazil is largely made up of Caboclos, descendants of Native Brazilians and Europeans - mostly Portuguese, French and Spanish.

North of Brazil has received and continues to receive large migration of people from South and Southeast regions of the country. In the 20th century, also received great migration from the Northeast, who were working in the rubber plantations of Amazonas and Acre.

Skin color/Race (2022)
Multiracial	67.2%
White	20.7%
Black	8.8%
Amerindian	3.1%
Asian	0.2%

== Economy ==
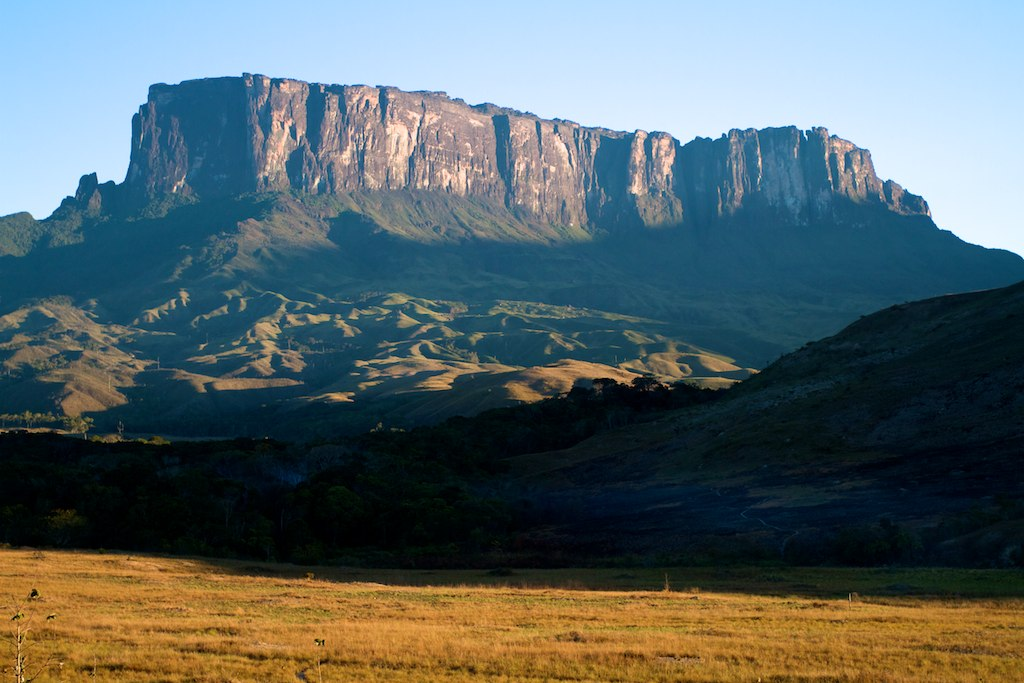
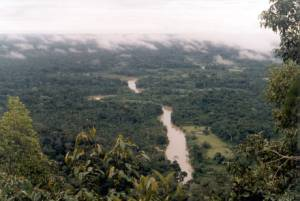

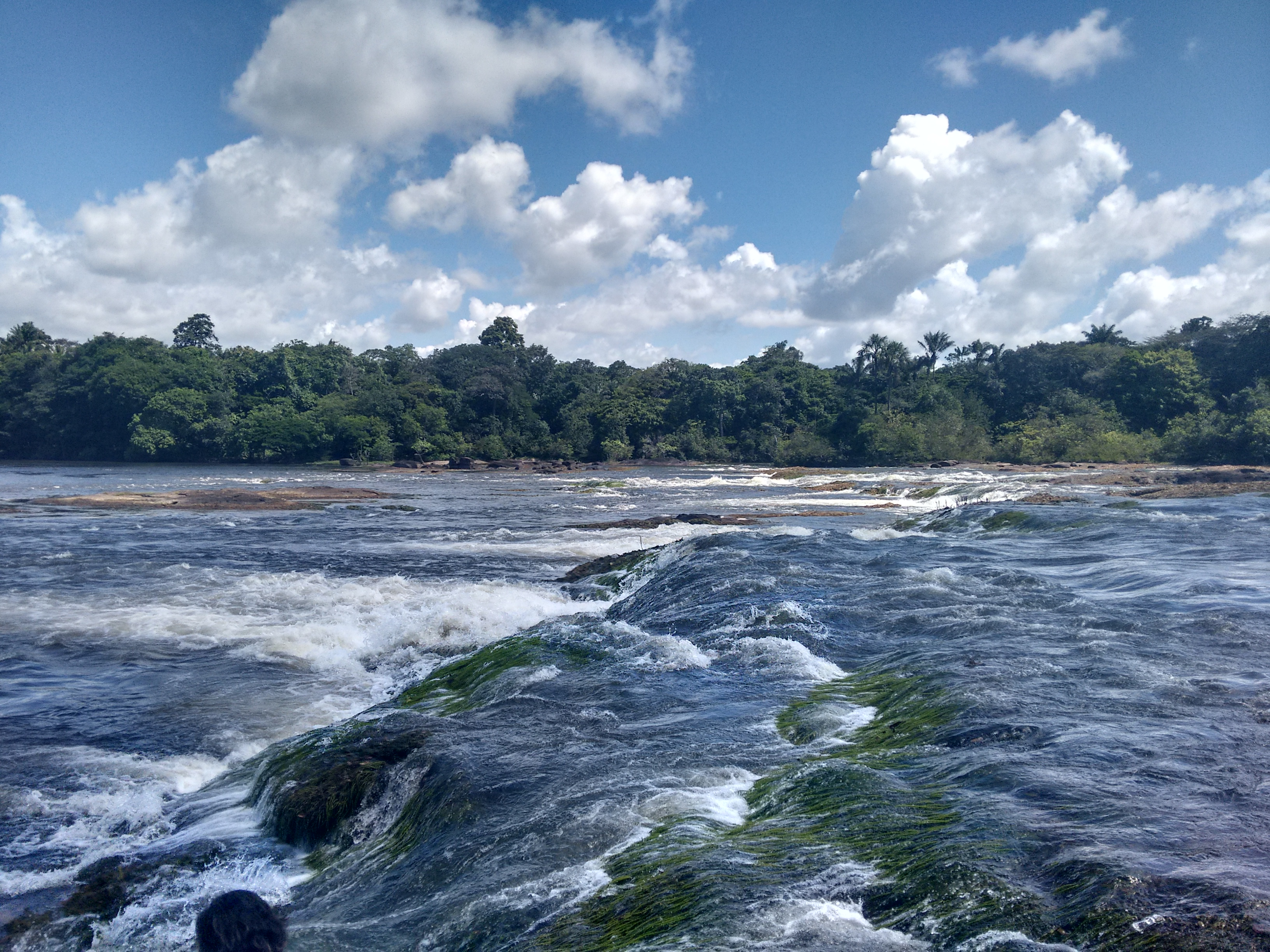
Mount Roraima, Uiramutã, Roraima (up). Serra do Divisor National Park, Cruzeiro do Sul, Acre (middle). Cachoeira Grande, Amapari (down)

The economy of the North Region is essentially based on the vegetal plantation and extraction, such as latex, açaí, woods and Brazil nuts; and mineral extraction of gold, precious stones, cassiterite and tin (metal); as well as mining exploitation, mainly iron, at Carajás Mountain Range (in the State of Pará) and manganese, at Navio Mountain Range (in the State of Amapá). Small-scale Buffalo creation and the Free Economic Zone of Manaus are also important to the local economy.

== Infrastructure ==
Vehicles: 1,746,501 (March/2007); Telephones: 1,805,000 (April/2007); Cities: 449 (2007).

Portuguese language is the official national language, and thus the primary language taught in schools. However, English and Spanish are also part of the official high school curriculum.

=== Educational Institutions ===
- Federal University of Pará (UFPA)
- Federal University of Western Pará (UFOPA)
- Federal University of Southern and Southeastern Pará (UNIFESSPA)
- Pará State University (UEPA)
- Federal University of Acre (UFAC)
- Federal University of Amazonas (UFAM)
- Amazonas State University (UEA)
- University of Amazon (UNAMA)
- Federal University of Rondônia (UNIR)
- Federal University of Tocantins (UFT)
- Federal University of Amapá (UNIFAP)
- Federal University of Roraima (UFRR)

=== Transportation ===
There are only a few highways in the North region. The most important ones are the BR-364, the Interoceanic Highway, running through Acre into Peru, the BR-010 connecting Belém to Southern Brazil, and BR-174 connecting Manaus to Venezuela.

Most of the transportation in the region is done by boat or airplane. There are two major airports in the region: Belém International Airport, serving Belém, and Eduardo Gomes International Airport, serving Manaus.

The Rio Branco International Bus Station offers services to destinations in Peru and Bolivia, the Boa Vista International Bus Station to Venezuela and Guyana.

== See also ==
- Açaí
- Free Economic Zone of Manaus
- Port of Santarém
- Guaraná
- Brazil Nut
- Central Market of Macapá
