= University of Rio de Janeiro (disambiguation) =

The Federal University of Rio de Janeiro was historically known as the University of Rio de Janeiro since 1920.

Universities with a similar name to "University of Rio de Janeiro" include:

- Federal University of the State of Rio de Janeiro
- Federal Rural University of Rio de Janeiro
- Rio de Janeiro State University
