= Federal University of Northern Tocantins =

Brazilian federal public higher education institution

- Type: Public
- Established: July 11, 1984
- Rector: Airton Sieben
- Location: Araguaína and Tocantins, Brazil
- Website: www.ufnt.edu.br

Federal University of Northern Tocantins (Portuguese: Universidade Federal do Norte do Tocantins, UFNT) is a multi-campus Brazilian federal public higher education institution based in the city of Araguaína, with a campus in Tocantinópolis. Law No. 13.856, which created the institution, was sanctioned on July 8, 2019, and only became effective on July 9, 2019, with its publication in the Diário Oficial da União (English: Federal Official Gazette).

The UFNT is the result of the separation of the Araguaína and Tocantinópolis campuses of the Federal University of Tocantins, with the creation of the Xambioá and Guaraí campuses planned.

However, the university only became effective after the appointment of the rectoral body, on July 9, 2020, and is still in the process of consolidation.

== History ==
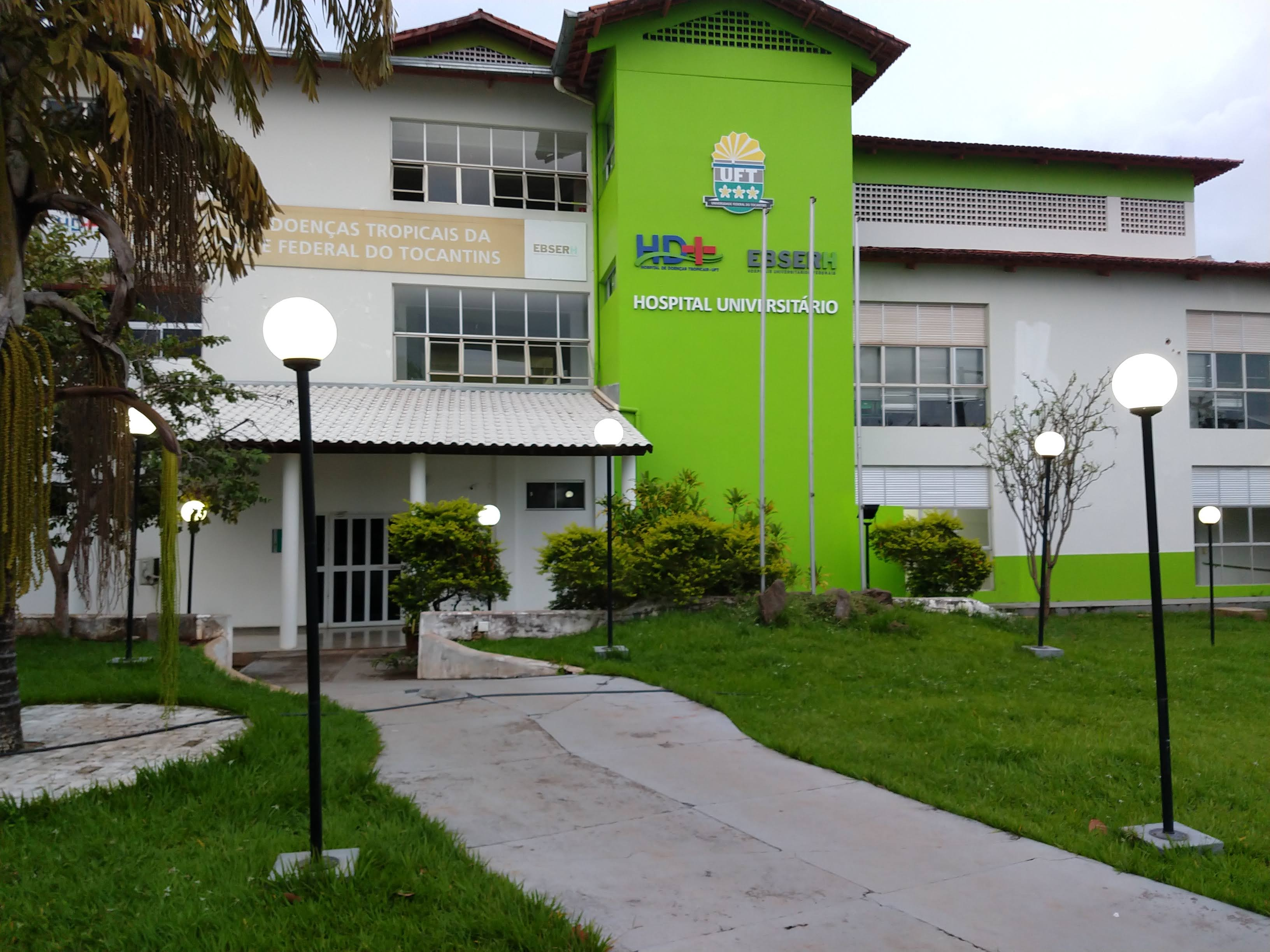
University Hospital of Tropical Diseases of Araguaína, still with the visual identification of the Federal University of Tocantins (UFT), but already legally a unit of the Federal University of Northern Tocantins (UFNT), in March 2020

The historical tradition of the UFNT begins with the "Faculdade de Educação, Ciências e Letras de Araguaína" (Facila), created by state law no. 9.470, of July 11, 1984. It came into existence offering courses in literature, history, geography, social studies and science. It was initially absorbed by the State Universidade Estadual do Tocantins until, in 2003, its structure was transferred to the Federal University of Tocantins (UFT).

After going through all the legislative committees, the proposal became Law No. 13,856, creating the "Federal University of Northern Tocantins" (UFNT), sanctioned on July 8, 2019, by President Jair Bolsonaro, becoming effective only on July 9, 2019, with its publication in the Federal Official Gazette.

Even though it had already been officially created, it only became effective after the appointment of professor-doctor in geography Airton Sieben as pro-tempore rector on July 9, 2020. Sieben will have the mission of promoting the transition between UFT and UFNT.

== Infrastructure ==
The UFNT (Federal University of Northern Tocantins) is structured under a multicampus distributed model.

Main Campus (Araguaína):

- Center for Integrated Sciences (Cimba Unit), located in the Cimba Sector.
- School of Veterinary Medicine and Animal Science (EMVZ Unit), situated at Km 112 of BR-153.
- Health Sciences Center (CCS Unit), in the Fátima neighborhood.
- University Hospital for Tropical Diseases of Araguaína (HDT-UFNT), located in the Anhanguera Sector, all within the municipality of Araguaína.

Tocantinópolis Campus:

- Center Unit, located in the Céu Azul neighborhood.
- Babaçu Unit, situated in Vila Santa Rita, both within the municipality of Tocantinópolis.

There are plans for the expansion of UFNT to the municipalities of Xambioá and Guaraí.

== See also ==
- Brazil University Rankings
- List of federal universities of Brazil
- Universities and Higher Education in Brazil
