= List of federal universities of Brazil =

This is a list of federal universities in Brazil.

== North Region ==
- Universidade Federal do Acre (UFAC)
- Universidade Federal do Amapá (UNIFAP)
- Universidade Federal do Amazonas (UFAM)
- Universidade Federal do Oeste do Pará (UFOPA)
- Universidade Federal do Pará (UFPA)
- Universidade Federal de Rondônia (UNIR)
- Universidade Federal de Roraima (UFRR)
- Universidade Federal do Sul e Sudeste do Pará (UNIFESSPA)
- Universidade Federal do Tocantins (UFT)
- Universidade Federal Rural da Amazônia (UFRA)

== Northeast Region ==
- Universidade da Integração Internacional da Lusofonia Afro-Brasileira (UNILAB)
- Universidade Federal do Agreste de Pernambuco (UFAPE)
- Universidade Federal de Alagoas (UFAL)
- Universidade Federal da Bahia (UFBA)
- Universidade Federal de Campina Grande (UFCG)
- Universidade Federal do Cariri (UFCA)
- Universidade Federal do Ceará (UFC)
- Universidade Federal do Delta do Parnaíba (UFDPar)
- Universidade Federal do Maranhão (UFMA)
- Universidade Federal do Norte do Tocantins (UFNT)
- Universidade Federal da Paraíba (UFPB)
- Universidade Federal de Pernambuco (UFPE)
- Universidade Federal do Piauí (UFPI)
- Universidade Federal do Rio Grande do Norte (UFRN)
- Universidade Federal de Sergipe (UFS)
- Universidade Federal do Sul da Bahia (UFSB)
- Universidade Federal do Vale do São Francisco (UNIVASF)
- Universidade Federal Rural de Pernambuco (UFRPE)
- Universidade Federal Rural do Semi-Árido (UFERSA)
- Universidade Federal do Oeste da Bahia (UFOB)

== Central-West Region ==
- Universidade de Brasília (UnB)
- Universidade Federal de Catalão (UFCAT)
- Universidade Federal de Goiás (UFG)
- Universidade Federal da Grande Dourados (UFGD)
- Universidade Federal de Jataí (UFJ)
- Universidade Federal de Mato Grosso (UFMT)
- Universidade Federal de Mato Grosso do Sul (UFMS)
- Universidade Federal de Rondonópolis (UFR)
- Universidade Federal Indígena (Unind) - proposed
- Universidade Federal do esporte (UFEsporte) - proposed

== Southeast Region ==
- Universidade Federal do ABC (UFABC)
- Universidade Federal de Alfenas (Unifal-MG)
- Universidade Federal do Espírito Santo (UFES)
- Universidade Federal do Estado do Rio de Janeiro (UNIRIO)
- Universidade Federal de Itajubá (UNIFEI)
- Universidade Federal de Juiz de Fora (UFJF)
- Universidade Federal de Lavras (UFLA)
- Universidade Federal de Ciência e Inovação de Minas Gerais (UFCIMG)
- Universidade Federal de Minas Gerais (UFMG)
- Universidade Federal de Ouro Preto (UFOP)
- Universidade Federal de Ciência e Inovação do Rio de Janeiro (UFCIRJ)
- Universidade Federal do Rio de Janeiro (UFRJ)
- Universidade Federal de São Carlos (UFSCar)
- Universidade Federal de São Paulo (UNIFESP)
- Universidade Federal do Triângulo Mineiro (UFTM)
- Universidade Federal de Uberlândia (UFU)
- Universidade Federal dos Vales do Jequitinhonha e Mucuri (UFVJM)
- Universidade Federal de Viçosa (UFV)
- Universidade Federal Fluminense (UFF)
- Universidade Federal Rural do Rio de Janeiro (UFRRJ)

== South Region ==
- Universidade Federal de Ciências da Saúde de Porto Alegre (UFCSPA)
- Universidade Federal da Fronteira Sul (UFFS)
- Universidade Federal do Pampa (UNIPAMPA)
- Universidade Federal do Paraná (UFPR)
- Universidade Federal de Pelotas (UFPel)
- Universidade Federal do Rio Grande (FURG)
- Universidade Federal do Rio Grande do Sul (UFRGS)
- Universidade Federal de Santa Maria (UFSM)
- Universidade Federal de Santa Catarina (UFSC)
- Universidade Tecnológica Federal do Paraná (UTFPR)

== See also ==
- Federal institutions of Brazil
- Universities and Higher Education in Brazil
