= Alice Pataxó =

Brazilian indigenous rights activist

- Born: June 7, 2001 (age 25); Prado, Bahia, Brazil
- Education: Federal University of Southern Bahia
- Occupations: environmentalist, indigenous rights activist
- Awards: 100 Women (BBC) (2022)

Alice Pataxó (born 7 June 2001) is a Brazilian indigenous climate activist. She gained national and international recognition after participating in the COP26 in Glasgow in 2021 as a spokesperson for the defense of the environment and indigenous rights. Alice was honored as one of the BBC 100 Women in 2022, after Malala Yousafzai nominated her for the award.

== Biography ==
Alice was born in a town of the Pataxó ethnic group, in the municipality of Prado, south of Bahia. She studied Humanities from the Federal University of Southern Bahia and lives between Porto Seguro and Aldeia Craveiro. Alice was involved in student activism and has been speaking out about indigenous rights since she was 14 years old. She was personally impacted by the expropriation of the Pataxó land known as Araticum in 2015. That is when she began posting on social media in order to raise awareness among their community. Alice since then has published opinion columns in various specialized medias. She eventually become an important voice in the activism for the rights of indigenous peoples in Brazil. She also raise awareness through social networks, where she has campaigned talking about the conservation of the Amazon, racism or sexual diversity- a matter which, according to her remains a taboo among the Amerindian population. Alice was the first indigenous woman to become a Brazilian ambassador for the WWF. In November 2021, she gained international repercussion by participating in COP26 in Glasgow, as a spokesperson in defense of the environment and indigenous rights.

== Recognition ==
- In 2022, Alice was included in the 100 Women list by BBC.
