= Seropédica =

- Municipality
- Município de Seropédica
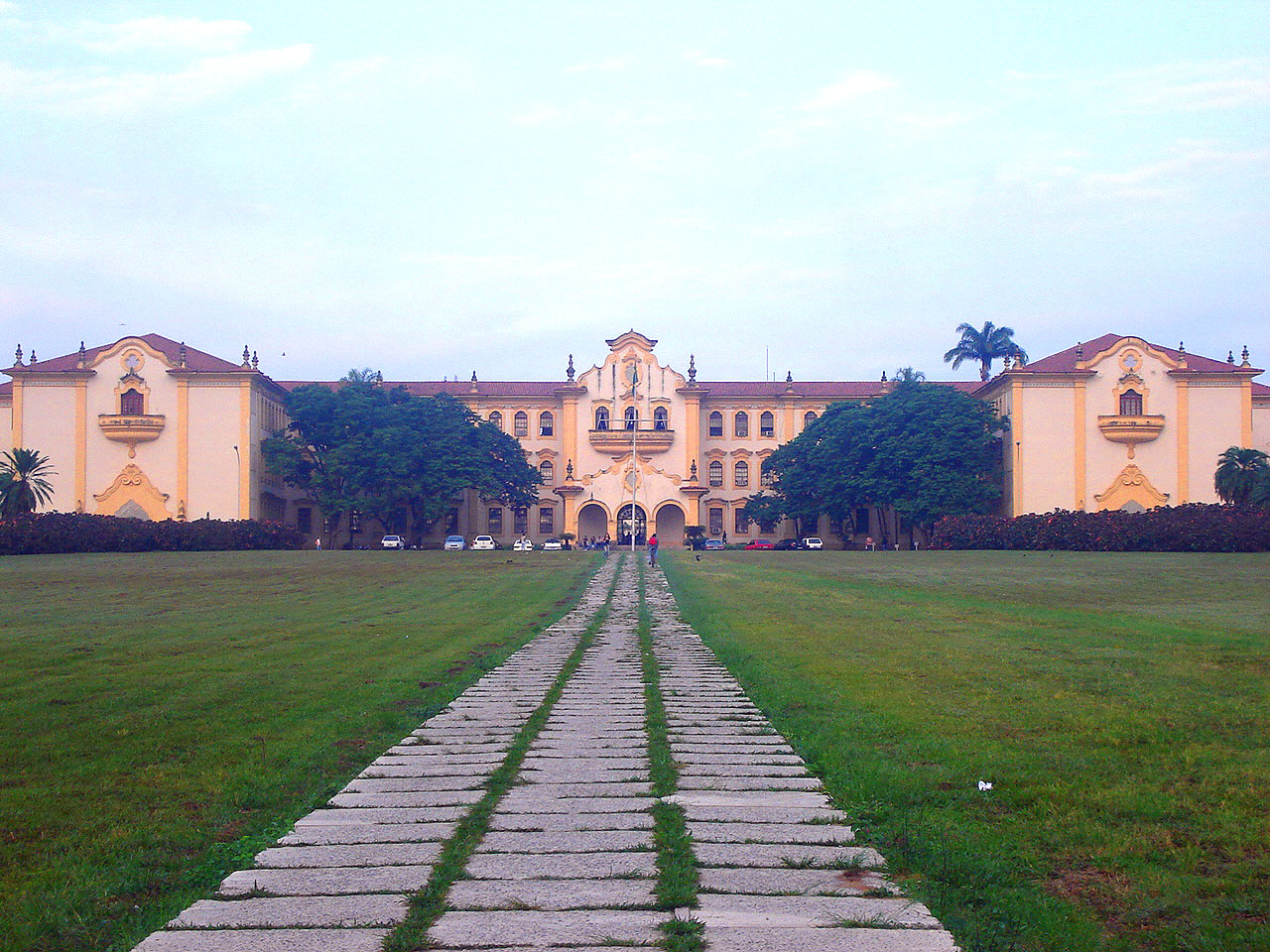
- Federal Rural University of Rio de Janeiro

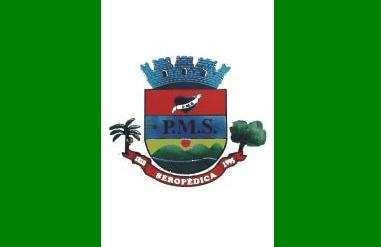
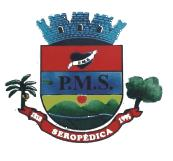
- Flag Coat of arms

- Location of Seropédica in the state of Rio de Janeiro

- Location of Seropédica in Brazil
- Coordinates: 22°44′38″S 43°42′28″W
- Country: Brazil
- Region: Southeast
- State: Rio de Janeiro

Government
  - Prefeito: Lucas Dutra

Area
  - Total: 283.794 km^{2} (109.573 sq mi)
- Elevation: 2 m (6.6 ft)

Population (2020)
  - Total: 83,092
- Time zone: UTC−3 (BRT)

Seropédica (Silk Farm, Portuguese pronunciation: [seɾoˈpɛdʒikɐ]) is a municipality located in Greater Rio de Janeiro, Brazil, 75 km from the state capital of Rio de Janeiro. Its population was 83,092 (2020) and its area is 284 km^{2} (110 sq mi).

== Mayor ==
- Lucas Dutra

== Education ==
The municipality is home of the main campus of the Federal Rural University of Rio de Janeiro (UFRRJ) and an Embrapa research institute focused on agroecology.

== Sports ==
- Annual Student Games

== Neighborhoods ==
- Águas Lindas
- Canto do Rio
- Campo Lindo
- Dom Bosco
- Jardim das Acácias
- Parque Jacimar
- Piranema
- INCRA
- Ecologia
- Fazenda Caxias
- Centro de Seropédica
- Boa Esperança
- Multirão
- Boa Fé
- Santa Sofia
- Jardim Maracanã
- Vera Cruz
- Vila Sônia
- Belvedere
- São Miguel
- Nossa Senhora de Nazaré

== Notability ==
The bacterium Herbaspirillum seropedicae is named after Seropédica, as it was isolated in the locality.

== Climate ==
Climate data for Seropédica (Ecologia Agricola) (1981–2010)
Month	Jan	Feb	Mar	Apr	May	Jun	Jul	Aug	Sep	Oct	Nov	Dec	Year
Mean daily maximum °C (°F)	32.4 (90.3)	33.2 (91.8)	31.7 (89.1)	30.1 (86.2)	27.8 (82.0)	27.1 (80.8)	26.5 (79.7)	27.5 (81.5)	27.4 (81.3)	28.7 (83.7)	29.8 (85.6)	31.3 (88.3)	29.5 (85.1)
Daily mean °C (°F)	26.7 (80.1)	27.2 (81.0)	26.1 (79.0)	24.5 (76.1)	22.3 (72.1)	21.4 (70.5)	20.8 (69.4)	21.2 (70.2)	21.7 (71.1)	23.3 (73.9)	24.3 (75.7)	25.7 (78.3)	23.8 (74.8)
Mean daily minimum °C (°F)	23.0 (73.4)	23.3 (73.9)	22.3 (72.1)	20.8 (69.4)	18.5 (65.3)	17.1 (62.8)	16.6 (61.9)	16.9 (62.4)	17.9 (64.2)	19.3 (66.7)	20.5 (68.9)	21.9 (71.4)	19.8 (67.6)
Average precipitation mm (inches)	197.8 (7.79)	146.6 (5.77)	157.2 (6.19)	76.3 (3.00)	63.8 (2.51)	38.6 (1.52)	37.7 (1.48)	28.9 (1.14)	87.0 (3.43)	97.8 (3.85)	149.4 (5.88)	178.6 (7.03)	1,259.7 (49.59)
Average precipitation days (≥ 1.0 mm)	13	10	10	6	7	5	5	5	10	9	11	13	104
Average relative humidity (%)	72.0	69.6	73.8	72.8	73.8	71.8	71.7	70.2	72.8	73.3	73.2	73.0	72.3
Mean monthly sunshine hours	194.3	199.8	189.3	194.0	190.0	202.1	196.0	199.7	135.7	156.0	163.7	166.7	2,187.3
Source: Instituto Nacional de Meteorologia
