= Campo Lindo =

Coordinates: 22°49′20″S 43°38′06″W

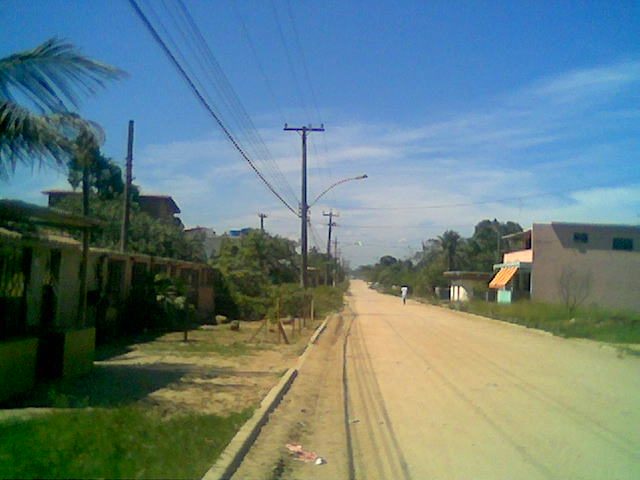
José Eleotério Street, the Campo Lindo's main street

Campo Lindo (Beautiful Field, in English) is a neighborhood of Seropédica, Brazil. The road BR-465 passes at proximity, and the Guandu river flows near.

== History ==
During the colonial period, the area currently occupied by the Campo Lindo neighborhood was under the control or influence of the Imperial Estate of Santa Cruz. Existing cartographic records do not conclusively confirm whether the area now belonging to Campo Lindo was within the legal boundaries of the Santa Cruz Estate. Despite this, maps indicate interventions made by the Jesuits in the region, such as the digging of canals for drainage. It is worth noting that a large part of the current municipality of Seropédica was known, as early as the 18th century, as Brejais de São João Grande. Another map from the first half of the 20th century shows that part of the Campo Lindo neighborhood was known as Brejo do Pau Falquejado.
