= Petrópolis Medical School =

Medical university in Petropolis

The Petrópolis Medical School - Arthur Sá Earp Neto University Center (FMP/UNIFASE) (Portuguese: Faculdade de Medicina de Petrópolis - Centro Universitário Arthur Sá Earp Neto) is a private institution of higher education and research on health sciences located in Petrópolis, Brazil. Founded in 1967, FMP has today 10 degrees: Medicine, Nursing, Dentistry, Nutrition, Psychology, Radiology, Administration, Human Resources, Environmental Management and Public Administration.
