= Federal Rural University of Amazonia =

University in Brazil

Coordinates: 1°27′31.0″S 48°26′04.5″W

- Universidade Federal Rural da Amazônia
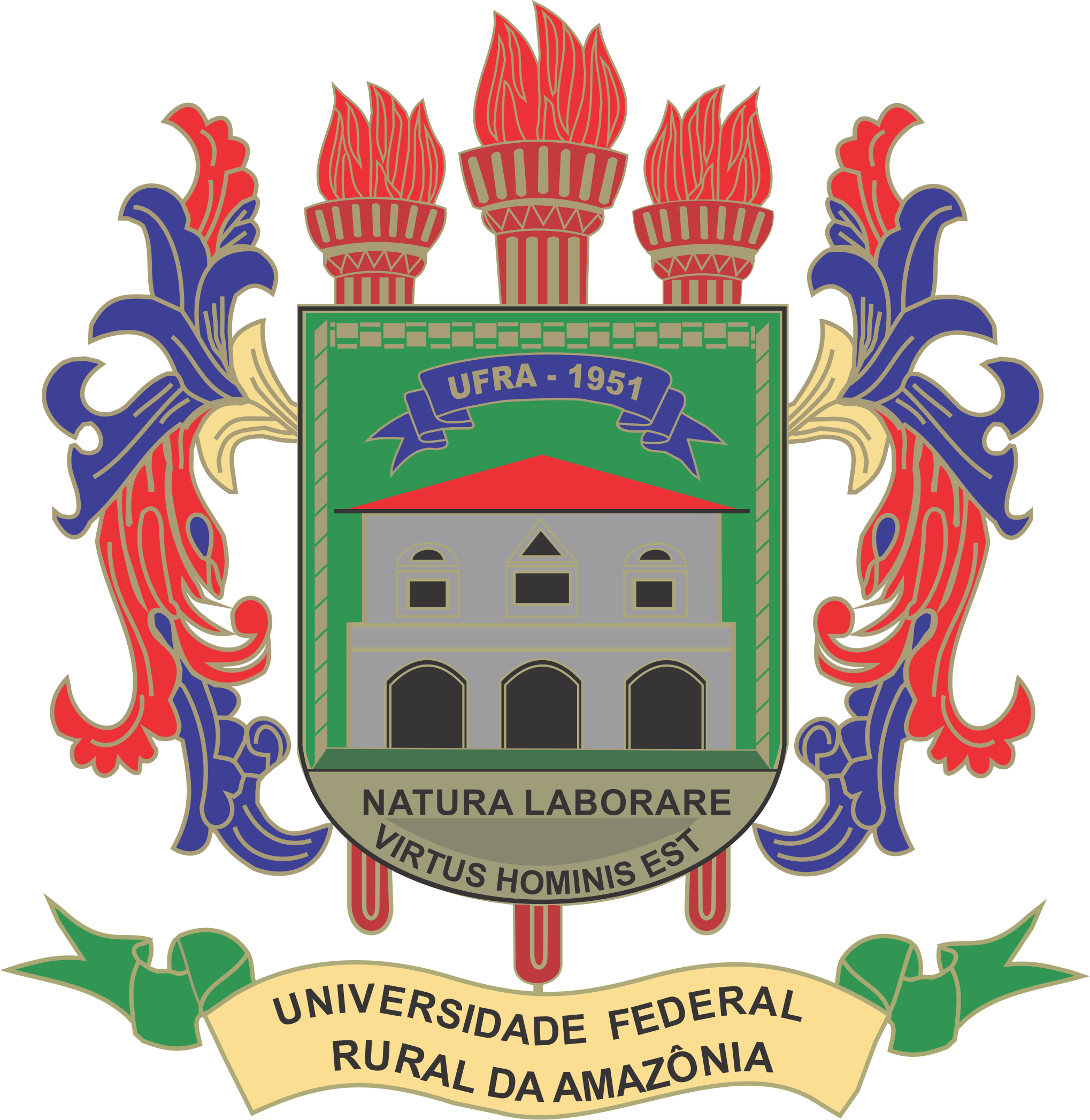
- Motto: "Natura Laborare Virtus Hominis Est" (English: Working Nature's Virtue Man)
- Type: Public University
- Established: 1945 (School of Agronomy); 2002 (University)
- Academic affiliations: RENEX
- Endowment: R$177 299 879,53 (2015)
- Location: Belém, Pará, Brazil
- Campus: Urban and Rural
- Colors: Green, Olive and Black
- Website: novo.ufra.edu.br
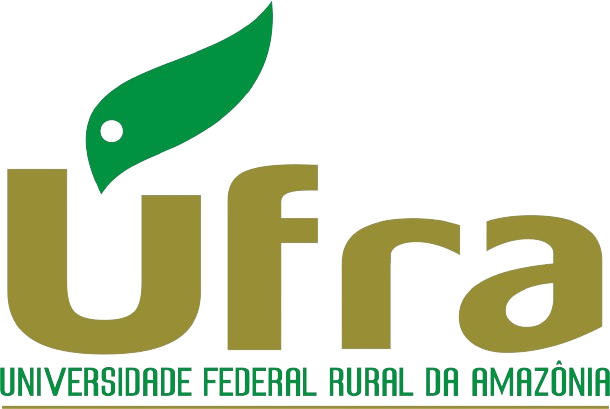

The Federal Rural University of Amazonia (Portuguese: Universidade Federal Rural da Amazônia, UFRA) is a Brazilian public University located in Belém, Pará, Brazil

== History ==
The UFRA has marked its origin in the School of Agronomy of Amazon, created in 1945, which was born with the purpose of preparing agronomists of the North of Brazil, It started operating in 1951, and already in the 1960 consolidated as a training institution for Human Resources in Agricultural Sciences.

In 1972, the School of Agronomy Amazon was called Faculty of Agricultural Sciences of Pará (FCAP) to better meet the demand for training human resources in the Amazon. In 1974, FCAP was created in the first veterinary hospital in the northern region.

In 2002, the decree that transformed the FCAP in Federal Rural University of Amazonia was signed.

Currently, the institution offers undergraduate courses in management, agronomy, biology, computer science, agricultural engineering, environmental engineering, cartographic and surveying engineering, aquacultural engineering, production engineering, forestry engineering, literature – sign language, veterinary medicine, animal science and information systems.

In addition to the 16 courses, UFRA has graduate programs in the areas of agricultural sciences, tropical aquaculture and aquatic resources, forestry sciences, animal production and health, life sciences, applied to agricultural biotechnology. The UFRA headquarters is located in Belém, on the Guamá River, and also has five campuses in the state, they are: Paragominas, Parauapebas, Capitão Poço, Capanema and Tomé-Açu.

== See also ==
- Federal Institute of Pará
- Federal University of Pará
- List of federal universities of Brazil
- Ministry of Education
- Pará State University
