= Federal Indigenous University =

The Federal Indigenous University (Unid or Unind ) is a proposed Brazilian higher education institution set to be based in Brasília. In November 2025, President Luiz Inácio Lula da Silva formally submitted to the National Congress the bill establishing the university, which is expected to begin its activities in 2027. The institution is expected to serve approximately 28,000 people within four years, including university housing; its selection process must respect the linguistic and cultural diversity of Brazilian indigenous peoples. The Minister of Indigenous Peoples, Sonia Guajajara, stated that the university "will revitalize languages and recognize the value of indigenous ecologies".

On February 10, 2026, the project establishing the Federal Indigenous University was approved in the Chamber of Deputies, after which it will proceed to analysis in the Senate.
