= Tocantinópolis =

Municipality in Tocantins, Brazil

- Municipality
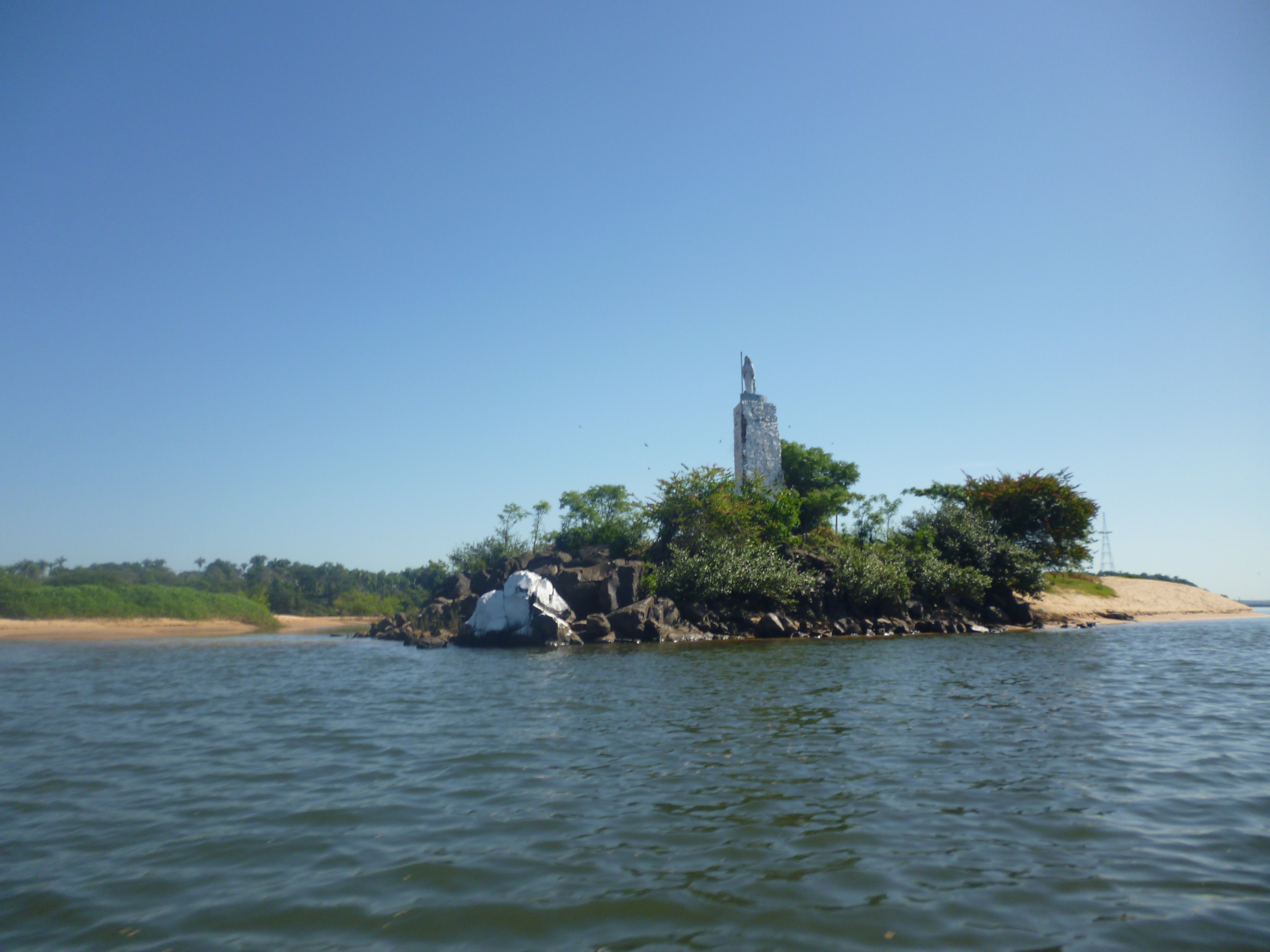

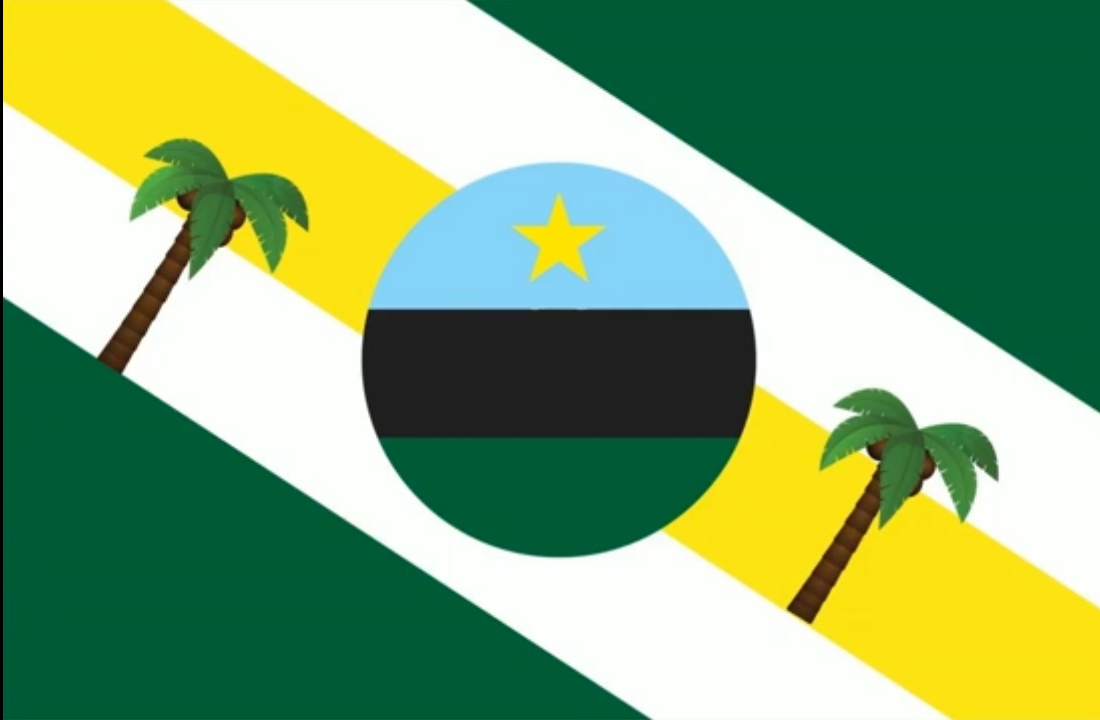
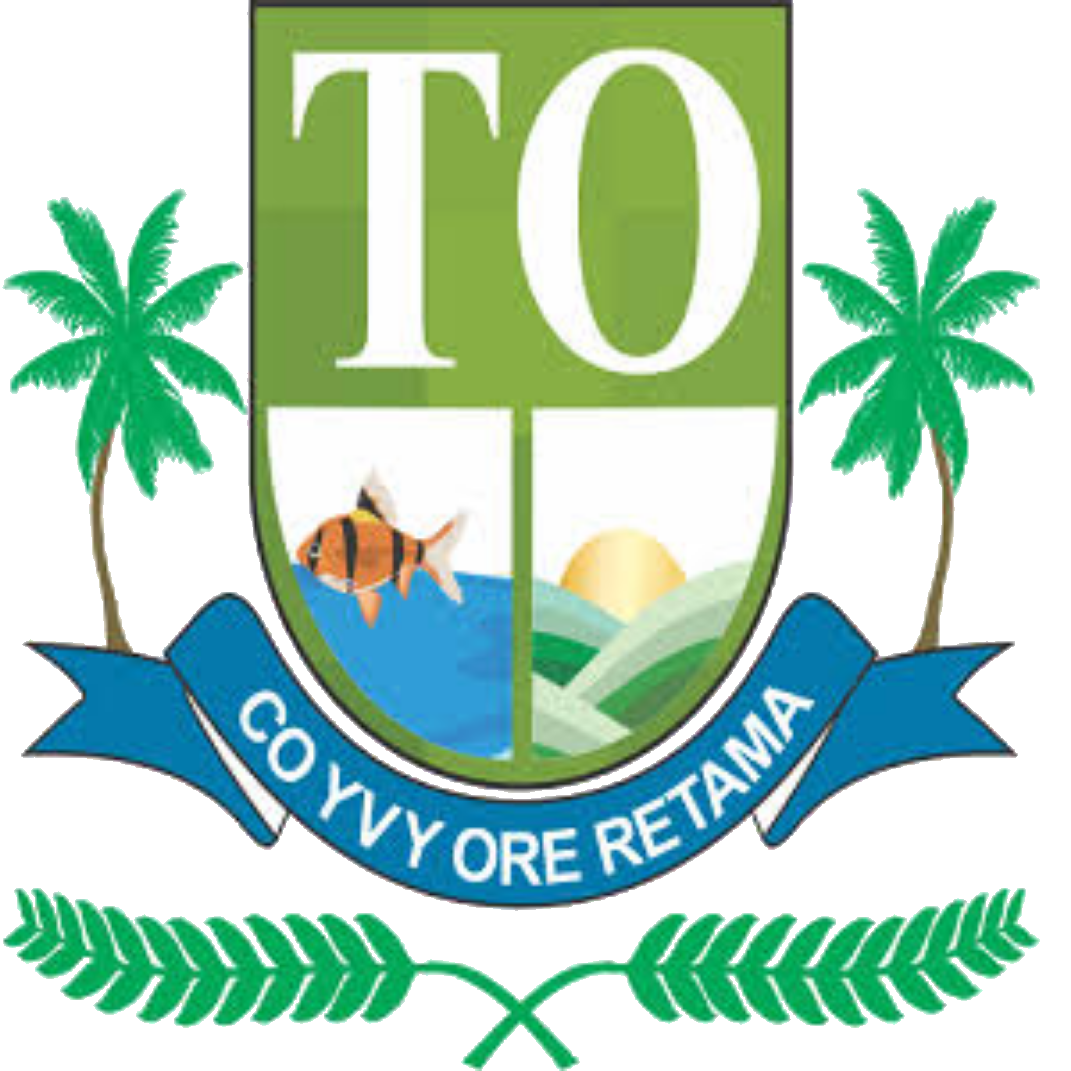
- Flag Coat of arms
- Interactive map of Tocantinópolis
- Coordinates: 6°19′S 47°17′W
- Country: Brazil
- Region: Northern
- State: Tocantins
- Mesoregion: Ocidental do Tocantins

Population (2020)
  - Total: 22,845
- Time zone: UTC−3 (BRT)

Tocantinópolis is a municipality in the state of Tocantins in the Northern region of Brazil. It is situated in front of Porto Franco, Maranhão, across rio Tocantins.

== See also ==
- List of municipalities in Tocantins
- Tocantinópolis Esporte Clube
