= Interamerican Open University =

- Spanish: Universidad Abierta Interamericana
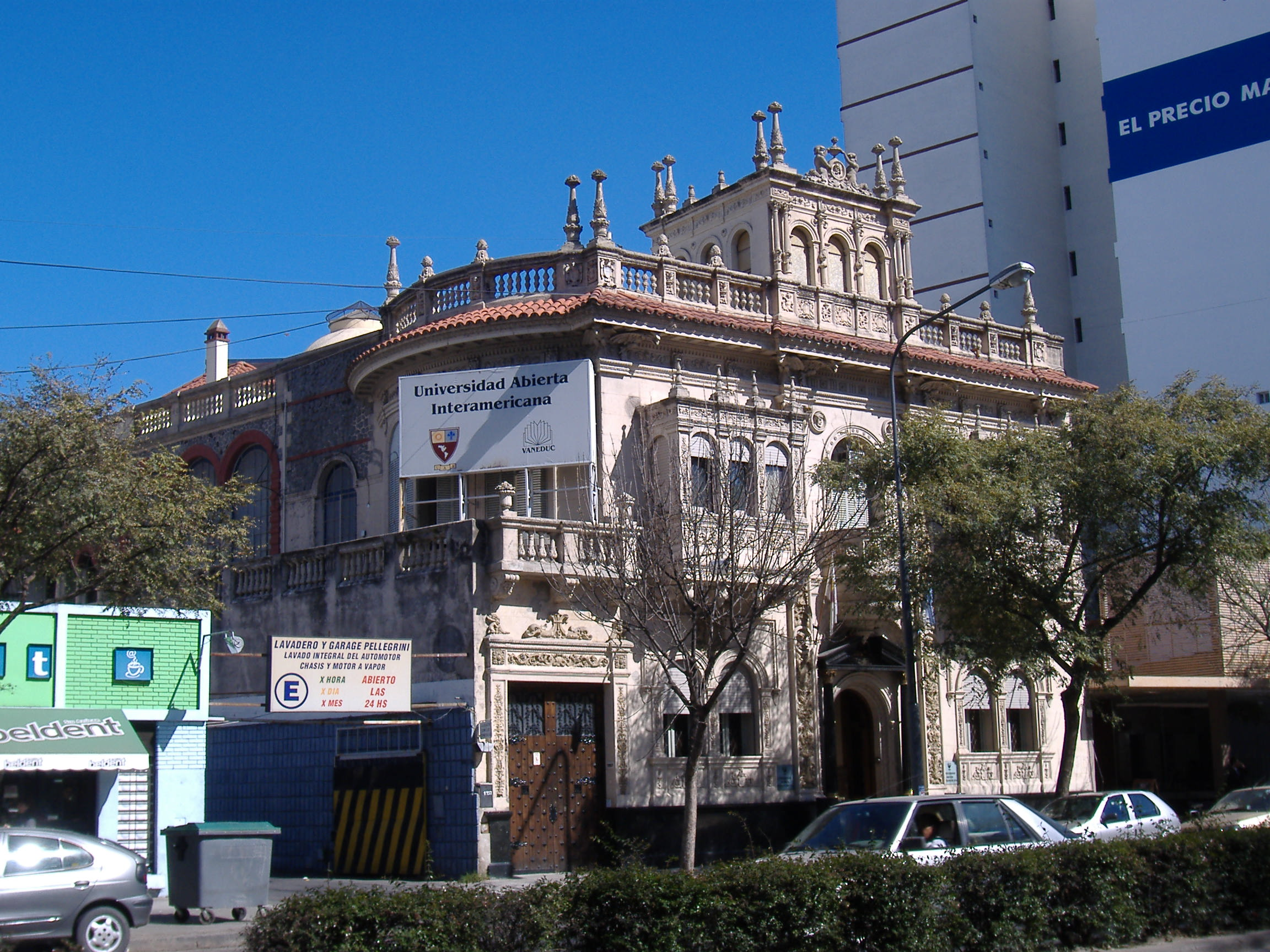
- The seat of the Open Inter-American University in Rosario, Argentina

Information
- Established: 1995

The Interamerican Open University (Universidad Abierta Interamericana, UAI) is a private university based in Argentina. It was established in 1995 and is part of the Vanguardia Educativa network (VANEDUC), a non-confessional network of educational and research centers that was established as far back as 1942.

== History ==
The university’s doors were opened in 1995, and the teaching activities began in 1996. After six years of activity, the university was reviewed by the National University Assessment and Accreditation Commission (CONEAU). In 2005, the university was granted full authorization as a university through Decree No. 1082/05, issued by the Executive Power.

In 2023, UAI received an institutional accreditation from HCÉRES, the French quality assurance body, which makes it the first South American university to achieve such accreditation.

== Organization ==
Its main seat and rectorate is located in Buenos Aires. It has educational facilities in six locations in the city and in Buenos Aires Province, as well as three locations and an administrative seat in Rosario, Santa Fe.

It has the following faculties:

- Architecture
- Sciences of Communication
- Entrepreneurial Sciences
- Law and Political Sciences
- Educational Development and Research
- Medicine and Health Sciences
- Human Motricity and Sports
- Psychology and Human Relations
- Informatics Technology
- Tourism and Hospitality

UAI provides also postgraduate education, granting master's degrees in several fields.
