= Federal University of Western Pará =

University in Brazil

Coordinates: 22°51′45″S 43°13′26″W

- Universidade Federal do Oeste do Pará
- Other name: UFOPA
- Motto: Natura Hominis et Progressio
- Type: Public
- Established: November 5, 2009
- Chancellor: Aldenize Ruela Xavier
- Vice-Chancellor: Solange Helena Ximenes Rocha
- Location: Santarém, Pará, Brazil
- Campus: Santarém, Itaituba, Monte Alegre, Alenquer, Oriximiná, Óbidos, Juruti
- Website: www.ufopa.edu.br

The Federal University of Western Pará (Portuguese: Universidade Federal do Oeste do Pará, UFOPA) is a public university in the state of Pará, in northern Brazil.

UFOPA was founded in 1970 as Núcleo de Educação em Santarém (NES), and was renamed UFOPA in 2009. It has an annual budget of 90 million real, and has over 400 faculty and over 10,000 students.

== See also ==
- List of federal universities of Brazil
