= Federal University of the State of Rio de Janeiro =

Brazilian university

- Universidade Federal do Estado do Rio de Janeiro
- Other names: UNIRIO
- Type: Public
- Established: June 5, 1979
- Chancellor: José da Costa Filho
- Vice-Chancellor: Bruna Silva do Nascimento
- Students: 8,500
- Undergraduates: 7,308
- Postgraduates: 1,550
- Location: (Brazil) Rio de Janeiro, Rio de Janeiro, Brazil
- Campus: Urban
- Website: unirio.br

The Federal University of the State of Rio de Janeiro (Portuguese: Universidade Federal do Estado do Rio de Janeiro, UNIRIO) is a federally funded public university located in the State of Rio de Janeiro, Brazil. It has several campuses in the city of Rio de Janeiro, including two in the Urca neighborhood.

It was established on June 5, 1979. The university was ranked 23rd in the Government's ENADE classification, in 2006. In 2010, it was given a score of 4 out of 5 in ENADE's system of evaluation.

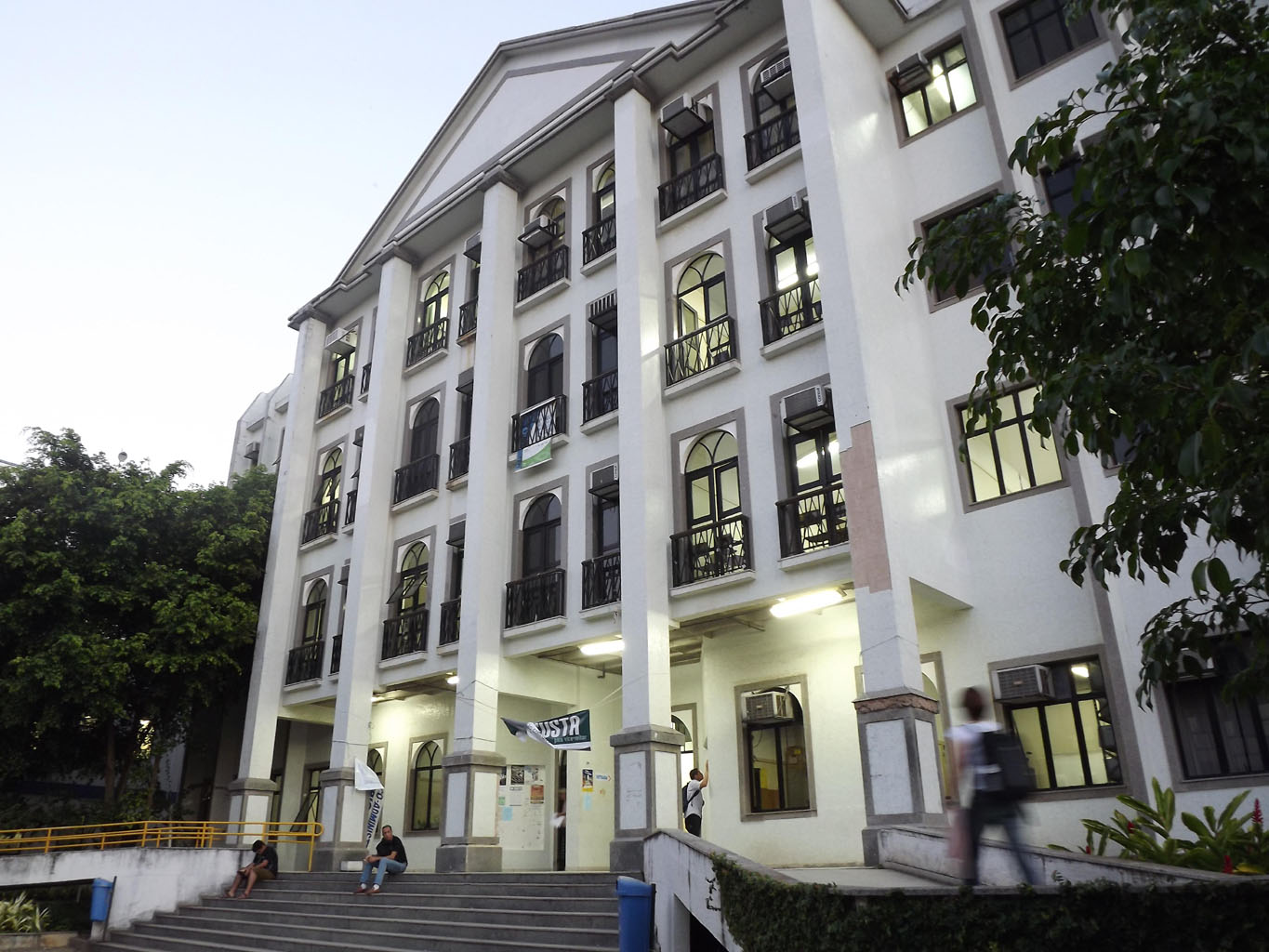
Human sciences center (CCH)

== History ==
UNIRIO has its origins in the Federation of Isolated Schools of the State of Guanabara (FEFIEG), created in 1969, that brought together institutions of higher education that were previously operating in isolation. It integrated traditional institutions such as the Central School of Nutrition, the Alfredo Pinto Nursing School, the National Conservatory of Theater (currently the School of Theater), the Villa-Lobos Institute, the School of Medicine and Surgery of Rio de Janeiro and the National Library's course in Library Science.

With the fusion of the states of Guanabara and Rio de Janeiro, in 1975, FEFIEG became the Federation of Isolated Federal Schools of the State of Rio de Janeiro (FEFIERJ). Two years later, the National Archive's Permanent Course in Archive and the National Historic Museum Course in Museums were incorporated.

In 1979 FEFIERJ was institutionalized with the name of University of Rio de Janeiro (UNIRIO). In 2003 the name was changed to Federal University of the State of Rio de Janeiro.

== See also ==
- List of federal universities of Brazil
