= Federal University of Southern Bahia =

Public university in Bahia, Brazil

- Universidade Federal do Sul da Bahia
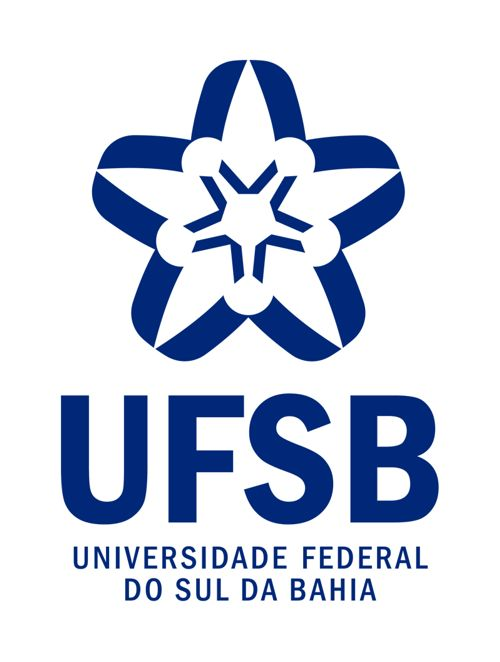
- Other name: UFSB

The Federal University of Southern Bahia (Portuguese: Universidade Federal do Sul da Bahia, UFSB) is a public institution of higher education in Brazil.

UFSB was created by law 12.818/2013, signed by the president of Brazil, Dilma Rousseff. It started academic activities in September 2014. UFSB has 1,610 students enrroled.

== Campuses ==
UFSB has three campuses:

- Itabuna - Jorge Amado Campus
- Porto Seguro - Sosígenes Costa Campus
- Teixeira de Freitas - Paulo Freire Campus

== Curriculum Architecture in Cycles ==
The curricular organization in Cycles considers steps and stages of learning and development. The Cycle System offers forms to students to gain more independence on their course, with diversity and autonomy on their own curriculum. The Cycles ensures a better preparation, in function of a progressive conception of learning. In addition, the Cycles architecture puts UFSB in compatibility with organization forms used worldwide. The formation cycle at UFSB is configured this manner:

First Cycle: Interdisciplinary Bachelors (BI) and Interdisciplinary Licenciate (LI).

Second Cycle: Professional and academic graduation.

Third Cycle: including medical residency, master and doctorate degrees, among other credits.

== See also ==
- List of federal universities of Brazil
