= Federal University of Tocantins =

Academic publisher

- Universidade Federal de Tocantins
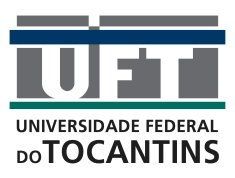
- Other names: UFT
- Location: 10°10′48″S 48°21′46″W

The Federal University of Tocantins (Portuguese: Universidade Federal do Tocantins, UFT) is the public, federal university of the state of Tocantins, in Brazil. The university has campuses spread throughout the state, including in Araguaína, Arraias, Gurupi, Miracema, Palmas, Porto Nacional and Tocantinópolis.

== See also ==
- List of federal universities of Brazil
