= Federal Rural University of Rio de Janeiro =

Public university in Brazil

Coordinates: 22.7635°S 43.6886°W

- Universidade Federal Rural do Rio de Janeiro
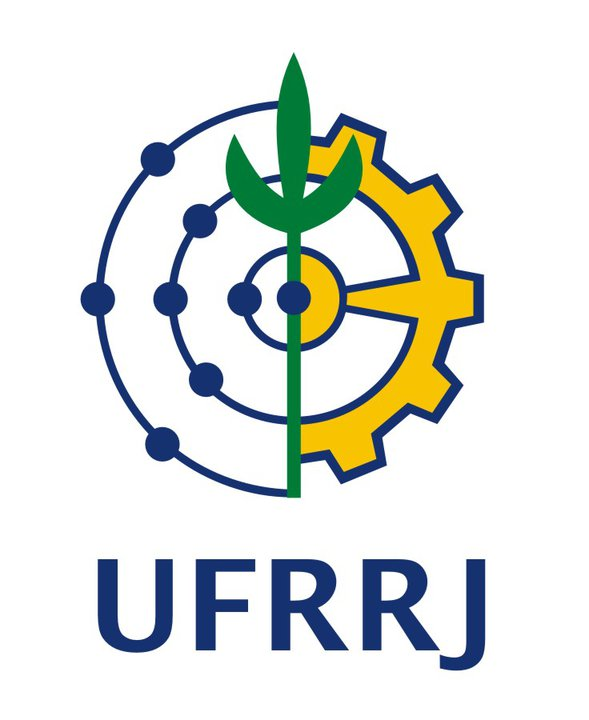
- Other names: UFRRJ
- Type: Public university system, Federal
- Established: October 20, 1910
- Endowment: R$ 352.733.407,24 (2010)
- Chancellor: Ricardo Motta Miranda
- Vice-Chancellor: Ana Maria Dantas Soares
- Administrative staff: 1086
- Students: 29,337
- Location: Seropédica, State of Rio de Janeiro, Brazil
- Campus: Seropédica, Nova Iguaçu, Três Rios
- Colors: Yellow - Green
- Website: www.ufrrj.br

The Federal Rural University of Rio de Janeiro (Portuguese: Universidade Federal Rural do Rio de Janeiro, UFRRJ) is a public university located in Seropédica in the State of Rio de Janeiro, Brazil. It possesses the largest campus among Latin American universities and is known for being the first university to offer agriculture related courses in Brazil.

In the 2019 Folha de São Paulo rankings, UFRRJ was ranked 35th in Brazil, with its programs in veterinary medicine and animal science in the top 10.

== History ==
Founded on October 20, 1910, by then president of the republic Nilo Peçanha, the College of Agriculture and Veterinary Medicine (Portuguese: Escola Superior de Agronomia e Medicina Veterinária, ESAMV) laid the foundations of agricultural education in Brazil, and began operating in 1913. In 1934, the ESAMV was split into three institutions: the National School of Agriculture, National School of Veterinary Medicine and the National School of Chemistry (incorporated in 1937 by the University of Brazil, later renamed the Federal University of Rio de Janeiro). These institutions have been crucial to overcoming the fragmentary and differentiated knowledge from existing agricultural and veterinary education throughout the nineteenth century and in creating a science-based, academic reference space. In 1944, the schools of agriculture and veterinary medicine were brought together as the Rural University, later renamed the Rural University of Brazil as more programs in rural fields (e.g., forestry) were introduced.

The current name dates from 1965, and UFFRJ remains under the federal Ministry of Education.

The university also operates a technical vocational school, offering specialized courses in agriculture, hospitality and the environment, as well as high school courses. Called CTUR, it is located on the main campus in Seropédica.

Smaller campuses are located in Nova Iguaçu and Três Rios.

== Undergraduate courses ==
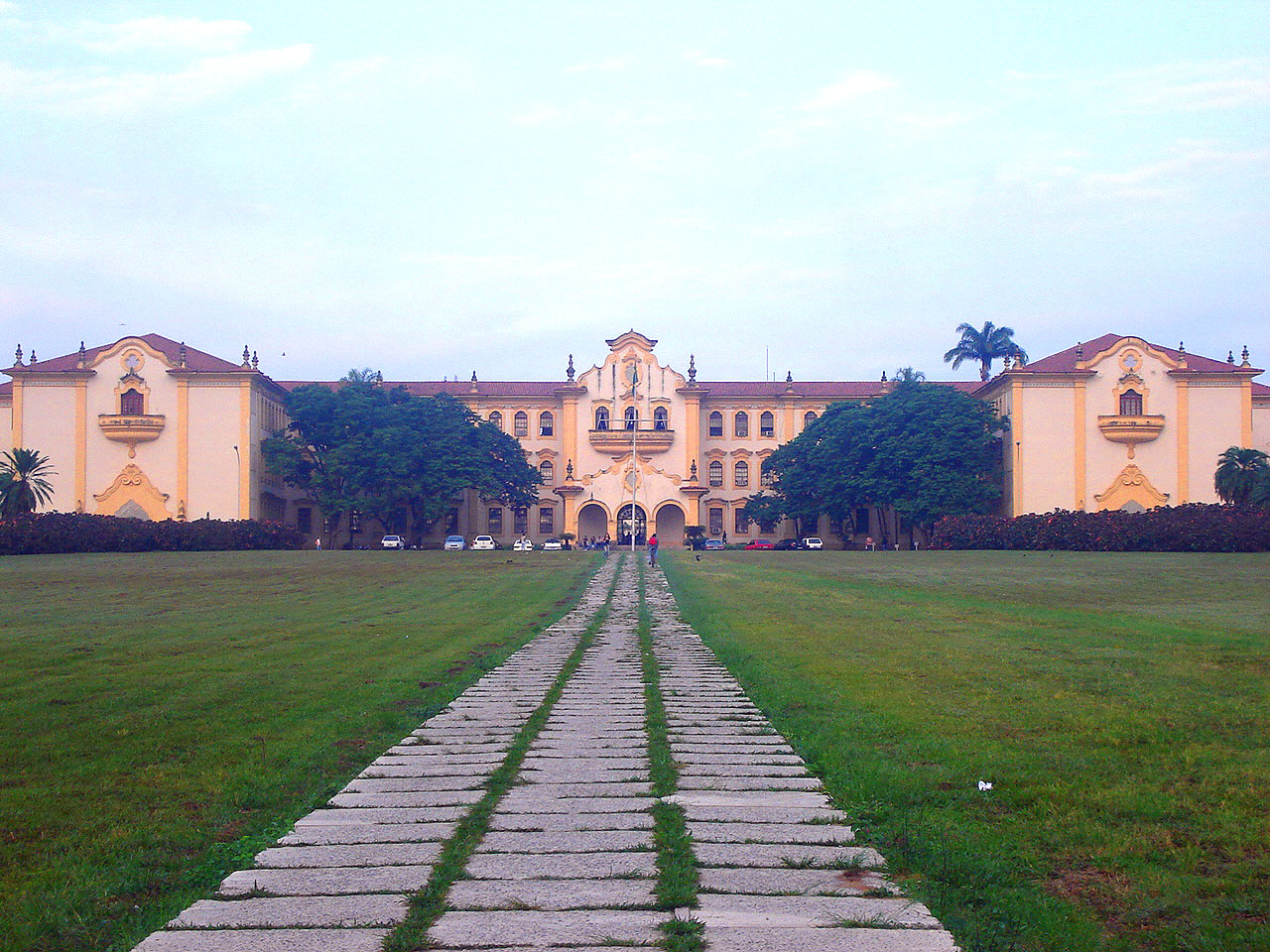
The main building in Seropédica

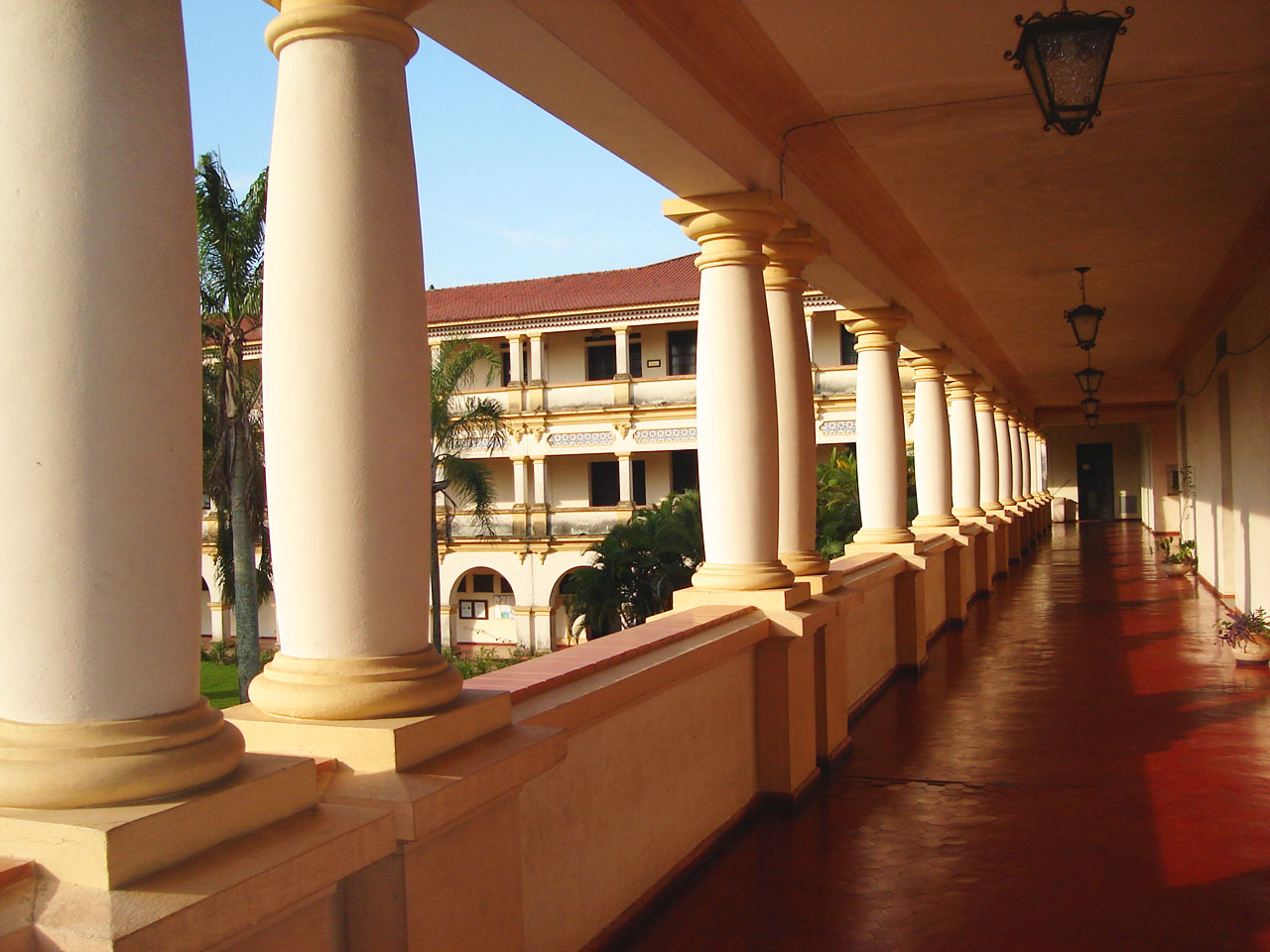
A corridor of the main building, looking into the courtyard

- Administration
- Architecture, Urbanism
- Accountancy
- Computer Science
- Information Systems
- Agronomy
- Agricultural and Environmental Engineering
- Engineering Surveying and Cartography
- Forest Engineering
- Food engineering
- Materials engineering
- Chemical Engineering
- Geology
- Mathematics
- Mathematics applied to computer
- Animal Science
- Chemistry
- Agricultural Sciences
- Biological Sciences
- Home Economics
- Pharmacy
- Environmental Management
- Veterinary Medicine
- Psychology
- Economics
- Social sciences
- Social communication, Journalism
- Law
- Art
- Physical education
- Philosophy
- Geography
- History
- Linguistics
- Pedagogy
- International relations
- Tourism
- Hotel Management

== See also ==
- List of federal universities of Brazil
