= Federal University of Rio Grande =

University and academic publisher

Coordinates: 32.0734°S 52.1638°W

- Universidade Federal do Rio Grande
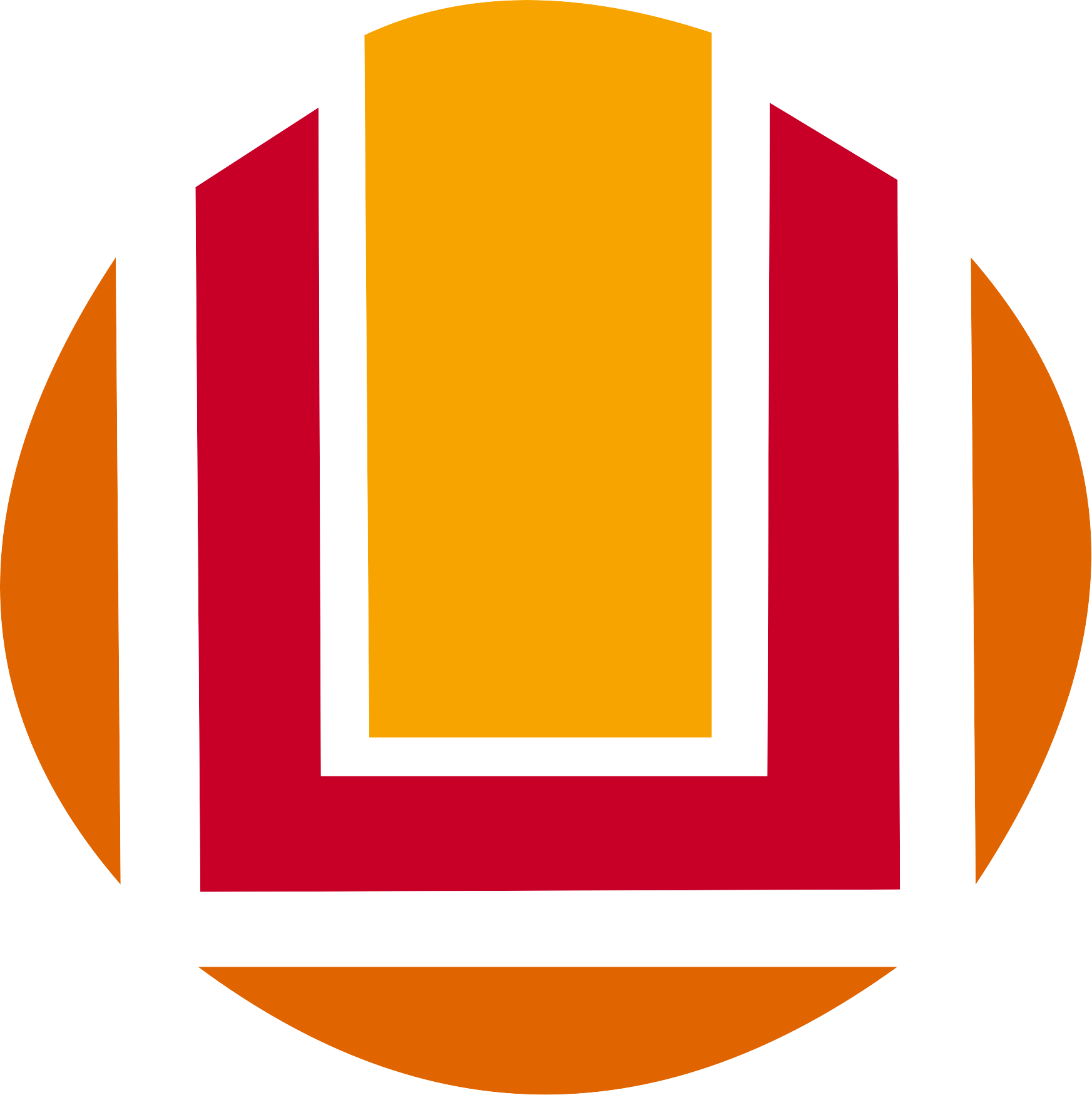
- Other names: FURG
- Former names: Fundação Universidade Federal do Rio Grande, Fundação Universidade do Rio Grande
- Type: Federal, public.
- Established: 20 August 1969
- Website: http://www.furg.br

The Federal University of Rio Grande (Portuguese: Universidade Federal do Rio Grande, FURG) is a public Brazilian university funded by the Brazilian federal government, located in the city of Rio Grande, Rio Grande do Sul, Brazil.

Formally established on October 21, 1969, it includes 18 departments providing 31 different undergraduate courses, as well as a number of graduate programs.

== Degrees ==
FURG provides five different types of degree: undergraduate (bachelor, teaching, and technology), graduate's specialization, residency (for undergraduate courses, such as medicine, teaching courses, nursing, and law), master's degree, and doctoral degree.

=== Undergraduate studies ===
FURG teaching the following undergraduate courses in five different campi (located in the following cities: Rio Grande, São Lourenço do Sul, Santa Vitória do Palmar, Santo Antônio da Patrulha):

- Accounting sciences – bachelor's degree
- Administration – bachelor's degree
- Agroecology – bachelor's degree
- Agrochemistry – bachelor's degree
- Food industries – bachelor's degree
- Applied mathematics – bachelor's degree
- Archaeology – bachelor's degree
- Archival science – bachelor's degree
- Automation engineering – bachelor's degree
- Biochemical engineering – bachelor's degree
- Biological science – both bachelor's degree and teaching degree
- Chemical engineering – bachelor's degree
- Chemistry – both bachelor's degree and teaching degree
- Civil engineering – bachelor's degree
- Civil engineering and management – bachelor's degree
- Port civil engineering – Bachelor's degree
- Computer engineering – bachelor's degree
- Cooperative management – technology degree
- Economics – bachelor's degree
- Environmental management – technology degree
- Environmental toxicology – technology degree
- Events – technology degree
- Exact sciences – teaching degree
- Field education – teaching degree
- Food engineering – bachelor's degree
- Geography – both bachelor's degree and teaching degree
- History – both bachelor's degree and teaching degree
- Hotel management – bachelor's degree
- Information systems – bachelor's degree
- International relations – bachelor's degree
- International trade – bachelor's degree
- Spanish, French or English – teaching degree
- Library science – bachelor's degree
- Mathematics – teaching degree
- Mechanical engineering – bachelor's degree
- Mechanical engineering and management – bachelor's degree
- Medicine – bachelor's degree
- Naval mechanical engineering – bachelor's degree
- Nursing – bachelor's degree
- Oceanology – bachelor's degree
- Pedagogy – teaching degree
- Physical education – teaching degree
- Physics – both bachelor's degree and teaching degree
- Production engineering – bachelor's degree
- Psychology – bachelor's degree
- Sciencies – teaching degree
- Tourism – bachelor's degree
- Visual arts – both bachelor's degree and teaching degree

=== Master's and doctoral degrees ===
FURG teaching the following master's and doctoral degrees in two different campi (located in the following cities: Rio Grande, Brazil|Rio Grande and Santo Antônio da Patrulha):

- Accounting sciences – master's degree
- Administration – master's degree
- Agroindustrial systems and processes – master's degree
- Applied economics – master's degree
- Aquaculture – master's and doctoral degree
- Biological oceanography – master's and doctoral degree
- Biology of continental aquatic environments – master's and doctoral degree
- Chemical engineering – master's degree
- Coastal management – master's degree
- Computational modeling – master's and doctoral degree
- Computer engineering – master's degree
- Education – master's degree
- Environmental education – master's and doctoral degree
- Exact sciences teaching – master's degree
- Food science and engineering – master's and doctoral degree
- Geography – master's degree
- Health sciences – master's and doctoral degree
- History – master's degree
- Law and social justice – master's degree
- Letters – master's and doctoral degree
- Mathematics – master's degree
- Mechanical engineering – master's degree
- Nursing – master's and doctoral degree
- Ocean engineering – master's degree
- Oceanology – master's and doctoral degree
- Physics – master's degree
- Physics teaching – master's degree
- Physiological sciences – master's and doctoral degree
- Public health – master's degree
- Science education – master's and doctoral degree
- Technological and environmental chemistry – master's and doctoral degree

== See also ==
- Brazil University Rankings
- List of federal universities of Brazil
- Universities and Higher Education in Brazil
