= Federal University of Roraima =

Public institution in Boa Vista, Brazil

Coordinates: 2.8333°N 60.6937°W

- Universidade Federal de Roraima
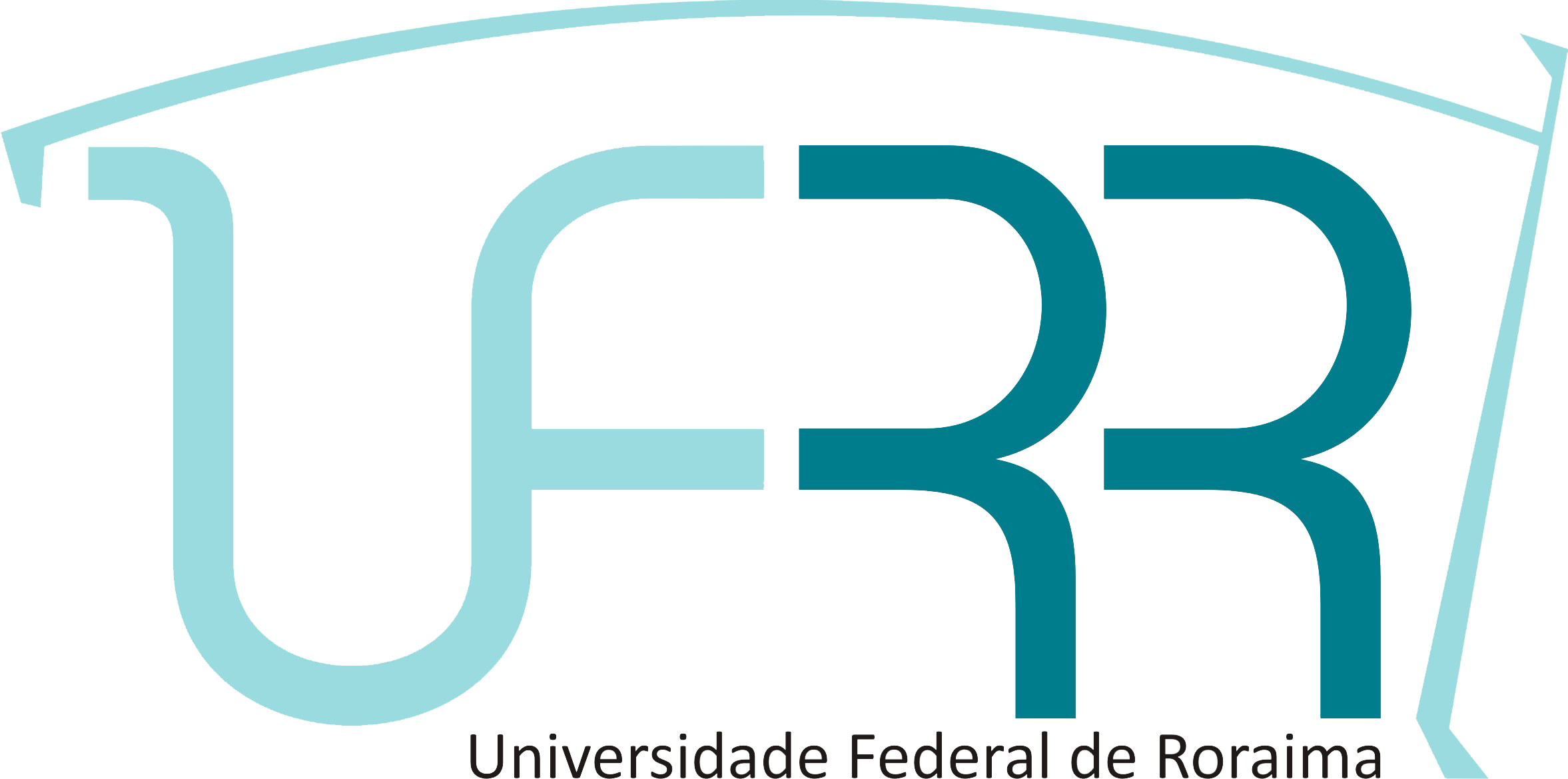
- University's Logo
- Other name: UFRR
- Motto: Sapientia - Natura - Homo
- Motto in English: Wisdom - Nature - Man
- Type: Public
- Established: 1989
- Budget: R$ 181.872.014,72 (2012)
- Chancellor: Dr. Jefferson Fernandes do Nascimento
- Vice-Chancellor: Dr. Américo Alves de Lyra
- Location: Boa Vista, Roraima, Brazil
- Website: Official website

The Federal University of Roraima (Portuguese: Universidade Federal de Roraima, UFRR) is a Brazilian public institution which is located in Boa Vista, Brazil.

== See also ==
- List of federal universities of Brazil
