= Federal University of Rondônia =

Brazilian public university

Coordinates: 8.8356°S 63.9389°W

- Universidade Federal de Rondônia
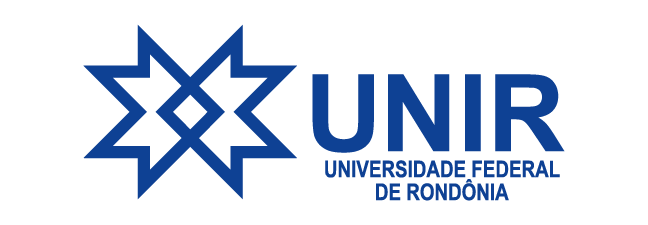
- Other name: UNIR
- Type: Public
- Established: 1982
- Budget: R$ 163.130.014,72 (2012)
- Chancellor: Marcele Pereira
- Vice-Chancellor: Marcelo Vergotti
- Undergraduates: 8.874
- Postgraduates: 581
- Location: Porto Velho, Rondônia, Brazil
- Website: www.unir.br

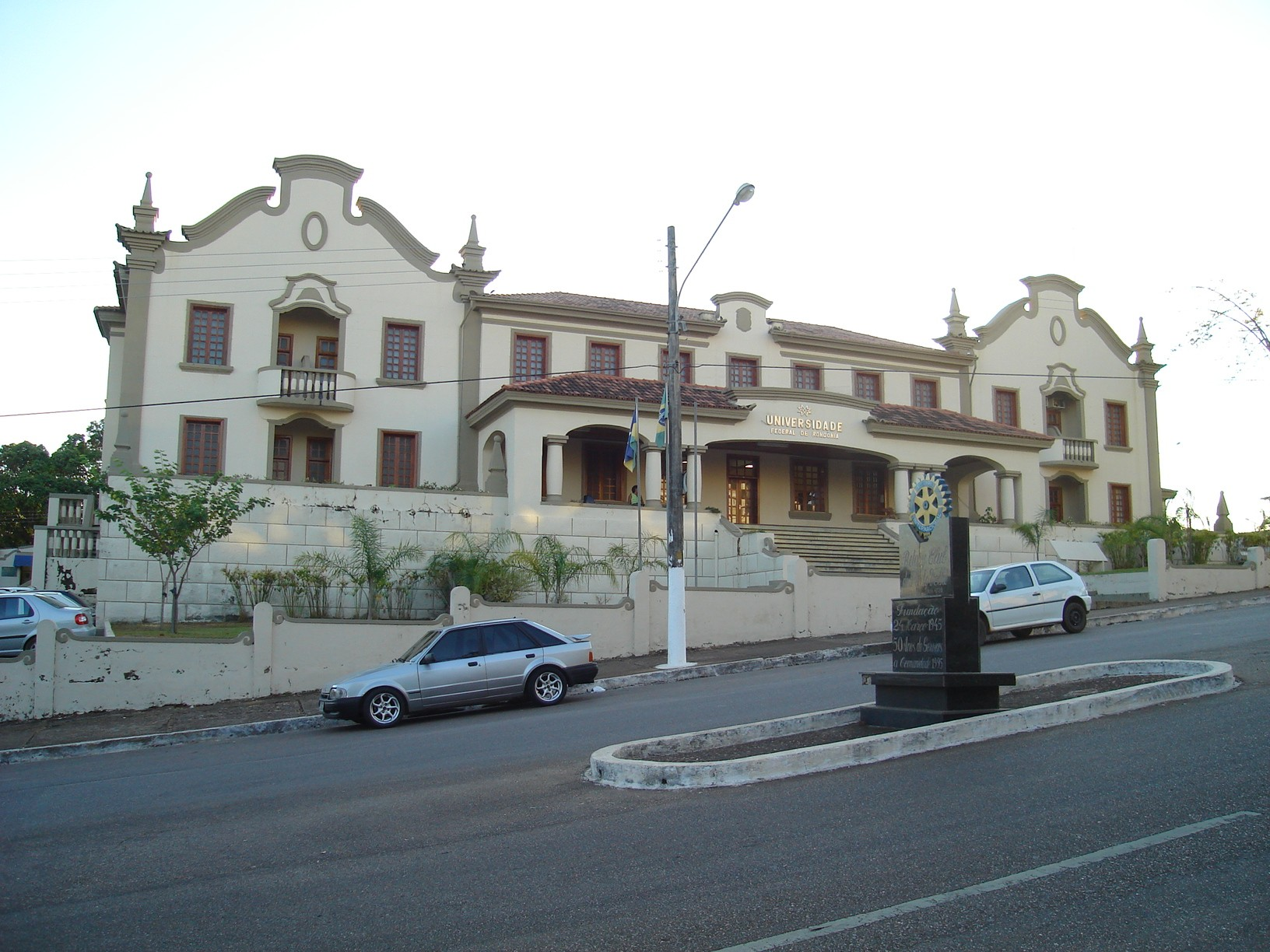
Main building

The Federal University of Rondônia (Portuguese: Universidade Federal de Rondônia, UNIR) is located in the state of Rondônia, in Brazil. It is the only public university in the state.

== Campuses ==
The Federal University of Rondônia has 8 campuses located in:

- Ariquemes
- Cacoal
- Guajará-Mirim
- Ji-Paraná
- Porto Velho
- Presidente Médici
- Rolim de Moura
- Vilhena

== See also ==
- List of federal universities of Brazil
