= List of universities in Brazil by state =

This is a list of universities in Brazil, divided by states.

Across the country there are more than 2,368 Brazilian universities and colleges (public and private) recognized by the MEC (Ministry of Education).

== Acre ==
- Faculdade da Amazônia Ocidental (FAAO)
- Faculdade Diocesana São José (FADISI)
- Faculdade Meta
- Federal University of Acre (UFAC)
- Instituto Federal do Acre (IFAC)
- União Educacional do Norte (UNINORTE)

== Alagoas ==
- Federal University of Alagoas (UFAL)
- Universidade Estadual de Alagoas (UNEAL)
- Universidade Estadual de Ciências da Saúde de Alagoas (UNCISAL)

== Amapá ==
- Federal University of Amapá (UNIFAP)
- Universidade Estadual do Amapá (UEAP)

== Amazonas ==
- Amazonas State University (UEA)
- Federal University of Amazonas (UFAM)
- National Institute of Amazonian Research (INPA)

== Bahia ==
- Bahia State University (UNEB)
- Catholic University of Salvador (UCSal)
- Federal Institute Baiano (IFBAIANO)
- Federal Institute of Bahia (IFBA)
- Federal University of Bahia (UFBA)
- Federal University of Recôncavo da Bahia (UFRB)
- Federal University of Southern Bahia (UFOBA)
- State University of Feira de Santana (UEFS)
- State University of Santa Cruz (UESC)
- State University of Southwestern Bahia (UESB)
- Universidade Salvador (UNIFACS)

== Ceará ==
- Ceará State University (UECE)
- Federal University of Ceará (UFC)
- State University of Vale do Acaraú (Uva)
- Universidade de Fortaleza (UniFor)
- Universidade Regional do Cariri (URCA)
- University for International Integration of the Afro-Brazilian Lusophony (UNILAB)

== Distrito Federal ==
- Catholic University of Brasília (UCB)
- Centro Universitário de Brasília (UniCEUB)
- Centro Universitário do Distrito Federal (UniDF)
- Centro Universitário Euroamericano (UNIEURO)
- Federal Institute of Brasília (IFB)
- Instituto Científico de Ensino Superior e Pesquisa (UNICESP)
- Higher Education Institute of Brasília (IESB)
- Universidade Paulista (UniP)
- University of Brasília (UnB)

== Espírito Santo ==
- Federal University of Espírito Santo (UFES)
- Instituto Federal do Espírito Santo (IFES)
- Universidade Vila Velha (UVV)

== Goiás ==
- Federal University of Goiás (UFG)
- Goiás State University (UEG)
- Pontifical Catholic University of Goiás (PUC-GO)
- Universidade de Rio Verde
- Universidade Paulista (UniP)
- Universidade Salgado de Oliveira (UNIVERSO)

== Maranhão ==
- Federal University of Maranhão (UFMA)
- Logos Institute of Theology
- Unidade de Ensino Superior Dom Bosco (UNDB)
- Universidade Ceuma (UNICEUMA)
- Universidade Estadual do Maranhão (UEMA)

== Mato Grosso ==
- Federal Institute of Mato Grosso (IFMT)
- Federal University of Mato Grosso (UFMT)
- La Salle College of Lucas do Rio Verde
- Mato Grosso State University (Unemat)

== Mato Grosso do Sul ==
- Anhanguera-Uniderp University (UNIDERP)
- Dom Bosco Catholic University (UCDB)
- Federal University of Grande Dourados (UFGD)
- Federal University of Mato Grosso do Sul (UFMS)
- Mato Grosso do Sul State University (UEMS)
- Federal Institute of Mato Grosso do Sul (IFMS)

== Minas Gerais ==
- Centro Universitário de Caratinga (UNEC)
- Faculty of Medical Sciences of Minas Gerais (FCM-MG)
- Federal Center for Technological Education of Minas Gerais (CEFET-MG)
- Federal Institute of Minas Gerais (IFMG)
- Federal University of Alfenas (UNIFAL)
- Federal University of Itajubá (UNIFEI)
- Federal University of Juiz de Fora (UFJF)
- Federal University of Lavras (UFLA)
- Federal University of Minas Gerais (UFMG)
- Federal University of Ouro Preto (UFOP)
- Federal University of São João del-Rei (UFSJ)
- Federal University of Triângulo Mineiro (UFTM)
- Federal University of Uberlândia (UFU)
- Federal University of Vales do Jequitinhonha e Mucuri (UFVJM)
- Federal University of Viçosa (UFV)
- FUMEC University (FUMEC)
- Guignard University of Art of Minas Gerais
- Inatel
- Instituto Federal do Sudeste de Minas Gerais (IFET-JF)
- Minas Gerais State University (UEMG)
- Pontifical Catholic University of Minas Gerais (PUC-Minas)
- State University of Montes Claros (Unimontes)
- University Center of Belo Horizonte (UniBH)
- University of Itaúna (UIT)

== Pará ==
- Centro Universitário do Pará (CESUPA)
- Faculdade de Belém (FABEL)
- Federal Institute of Pará (IFPA)
- Federal Rural University of Amazonia (UFRA)
- Federal University of Pará (UFPA)
- Federal University of Southern and Southeastern Pará (UNIFESSPA)
- Federal University of Western Pará (UFOPA)
- Lutheran University of Brazil (ULBRA)
- Pará State University (UEPA)
- Universidade da Amazônia (UNAMA)
- Universidade Paulista (UNIP-PA)

== Paraíba ==
- Federal University of Campina Grande (UFCG)
- Federal University of Paraíba (UFPB)
- Paraíba State University (UEPB)
- Instituto Federal de Educação da Paraíba (IFPB)
- Faculdade Internacional da Paraíba (FPB)

== Paraná ==
- Centro Universitário Filadélfia (UniFil)
- Centro Universitário Internacional (UNINTER)
- Federal Institute of Paraná (IFPR)
- Federal University for Latin American Integration (UNILA)
- Federal University of Paraná (UFPR)
- Federal University of Technology – Paraná (UTFPR)
- Pontifical Catholic University of Paraná (PUC-PR)
- State University of Londrina (UEL)
- State University of Maringá (UEM)
- State University of Ponta Grossa (UEPG)
- Universidade Estadual do Centro-Oeste (UNICENTRO)
- Universidade Estadual do Norte do Paraná (UENP)
- Universidade Norte do Paraná (UNOPAR)
- Universidade Paranaense (UNIPAR)
- Universidade Positivo (UP)
- Universidade Tuiuti do Paraná (UTP)
- University of the State of Paraná (UNESPAR)
- Western Paraná State University (UNIOESTE)

== Pernambuco ==
- Catholic University of Pernambuco (UniCaP)
- Federal Institute of Pernambuco (IFPE)
- Federal Rural University of Pernambuco (UFRPE)
- Federal University of Pernambuco (UFPE)
- Federal University of the São Francisco Valley (UNIVASF)
- University of Pernambuco (UPE)

== Piauí ==
- Centro Universitário Uninovafapi (UNINOVAFAPI)
- Federal University of Piauí (UFPI)
- Universidade Estadual do Piauí (UESPI)

== Rio de Janeiro ==
- Catholic University of Petrópolis (UCP)
- Centro Universitário IBMR (IBMR)
- Estácio de Sá Universities (UNESA)
- Federal Center for Technological Education of Rio de Janeiro (CEFET/RJ)
- Federal Institute of Rio de Janeiro (IFRJ)
- Federal Rural University of Rio de Janeiro (UFRRJ)
- Federal University of Rio de Janeiro (UFRJ)
- Federal University of the State of Rio de Janeiro (UNIRIO)
- Fluminense Federal University (UFF)
- Fundação Getulio Vargas (FGV-Rio)
- Instituto Militar de Engenharia (IME)
- Petrópolis Medical School (UNIFASE/FMP)
- Pontifical Catholic University of Rio de Janeiro (PUC-Rio)
- Rio de Janeiro State University (UERJ)
- State University of Northern Rio de Janeiro (UENF)
- Universidade Candido Mendes (UCAM)
- Universidade Castelo Branco (UCB)
- Universidade do Grande Rio (UNIGRANRIO)
- Universidade Iguaçu (UNIG)
- Universidade Salgado de Oliveira (UNIVERSO)
- Universidade Santa Úrsula (USU)
- Universidade Veiga de Almeida (UVA)
- University of Vassouras (USS)
- West Zone State University (UEZO)

== Rio Grande do Norte ==
- Federal Rural University of the Semi-arid Region (UFERSA)
- Federal University of Rio Grande do Norte (UFRN)
- Universidade do Estado do Rio Grande do Norte (UERN)
- Centro Universitario Natalense (UNINACEUNA)
- Instituto Federal do Rio Grande do Norte (IFRN)
- Universidade Potiguar (UnP)

== Rio Grande do Sul ==
- Catholic University of Pelotas (UCPel)
- Centro Universitário Ritter dos Reis (UniRitter)
- Federal Institute of Rio Grande do Sul (IFRS)
- Federal University of Health Sciences of Porto Alegre (UFCSPA)
- Federal University of Pampa (Unipampa)
- Federal University of Pelotas (UFPel)
- Federal University of Rio Grande (FURG)
- Federal University of Rio Grande do Sul (UFRGS)
- Federal University of Santa Maria (UFSM)
- Instituto de Cardiologia do Rio Grande do Sul (IC-FUC)
- Lutheran University of Brazil (ULBRA)
- Pontifical Catholic University of Rio Grande do Sul (PUC-RS)
- Rio Grande do Sul State University (UERGS)
- Sul-Rio-Grandense Federal Institute (IFSul)
- Centro Universitário da Região da Campanha (URCAMP)
- Universidade de Santa Cruz do Sul (UNISC)
- Universidade do Vale do Rio dos Sinos (Unisinos)
- Universidade Feevale (FEEVALE)
- Universidade Franciscana (UFN)
- Universidade La Salle (Unilasalle)
- Universidade Regional do Noroeste do Estado do Rio Grande do Sul (UNIJUÍ)
- Universidade Regional Integrada do Alto Uruguai e das Missões (URI)
- University of Caxias do Sul (UCS)
- University of Cruz Alta (UNICRUZ)
- University of Passo Fundo (UPF)
- University of Taquari Valley (UNIVATES)

== Rondônia ==
- Faculdade da Amazônia (FAMA)
- Federal University of Rondônia (UNIR)
- Instituição de Ensino Superior de Cacoal (FANORTE)

== Roraima ==
- Federal University of Roraima (UFRR)

== Santa Catarina ==
- Federal Institute of Santa Catarina (IFSC)
- Federal University of Fronteira Sul (UFFS)
- Federal University of Santa Catarina (UFSC)
- Santa Catarina State University (Udesc)
- Universidade da Região de Joinville (Univille)
- Universidade do Extremo Sul Catarinense (UNESC)
- Universidade do Oeste de Santa Catarina (UNOESC)
- Universidade do Planalto Catarinense (Uniplac)
- Universidade do Sul de Santa Catarina (Unisul)
- Universidade do Vale do Itajaí (Univali)
- Universidade Regional de Blumenau (FURB)

== São Paulo ==
Public

- Federal Institute of São Paulo (IFSP)
- Federal University of ABC (UFABC)
- Federal University of São Carlos (UFSCar)
- Federal University of São Paulo (Unifesp)
- Fundação Educacional do Município de Assis (FEMA)
- Instituto Tecnológico de Aeronáutica (ITA)
- Municipal University of São Caetano do Sul (USCS)
- São Paulo State Technological Colleges (FATEC)
- São Paulo State University (Unesp)
- State University of Campinas (Unicamp)
- Universidade de Taubaté (Unitau)
- Universidade Livre de Música (ULM)
- University of São Paulo (USP)
- Virtual University of the State of São Paulo (UNIVESP)

Private

- Anhembi Morumbi University (UAM)
- Bandeirante University of São Paulo (UNIBAN)
- Catholic University of Santos (UNISANTOS)
- Centro Universitário Belas Artes de São Paulo (FEBASP)
- Centro Universitário da FEI (FEI)
- Centro Universitário das Faculdades Metropolitanas Unidas (FMU)
- Centro Universitário Eurípedes de Marília (UNIVEM)
- Centro Universitário Ítalo Brasileiro (UniÍtalo)
- Centro Universitário São Camilo (CUSC)
- Escola Superior de Propaganda e Marketing (ESPM)
- Fundação Armando Alvares Penteado (FAAP)
- Fundação Escola de Comércio Álvares Penteado (FECAP)
- Fundação Getulio Vargas (FGV)
- Fundação Santo André (FSA)
- Insper Institute of Education and Research (Insper)
- Instituto Mauá de Tecnologia (IMT)
- Mackenzie Presbyterian University (Mackenzie)
- Methodist University of Piracicaba (Unimep)
- Methodist University of São Paulo (Umesp)
- Pontifical Catholic University of Campinas (PUC-Campinas)
- Pontifical Catholic University of São Paulo (PUC-SP)
- Universidade Cidade de São Paulo (UNICID)
- Universidade de Mogi das Cruzes (UMC)
- Universidade de Ribeirão Preto (UNAERP)
- Universidade de Santo Amaro (UNISA)
- Universidade do Vale do Paraíba (UNIVAP)
- Universidade Guarulhos (UNG)
- Universidade Nove de Julho (UNINOVE)
- Universidade Paulista (UniP)
- Universidade Santa Cecília (UNISANTA)
- Universidade São Francisco (USF)
- Universidade São Judas Tadeu (USJT)
- Universidade São Marcos (UNIMARCO, closed in 2012)

== Sergipe ==
- Federal University of Sergipe (UFS)

== Tocantins ==
- Federal University of Tocantins (UFT)
- Universidade Estadual do Tocantins (UNITINS)
- Universidade Federal do Norte do Tocantins (UFNT)

== See also ==
- List of federal universities of Brazil
- List of public universities in Brazil
- List of state universities in Brazil
- Rankings of universities in Brazil
- Universities and higher education in Brazil
