= Novo Cangaço =

Type of crime in Brazil

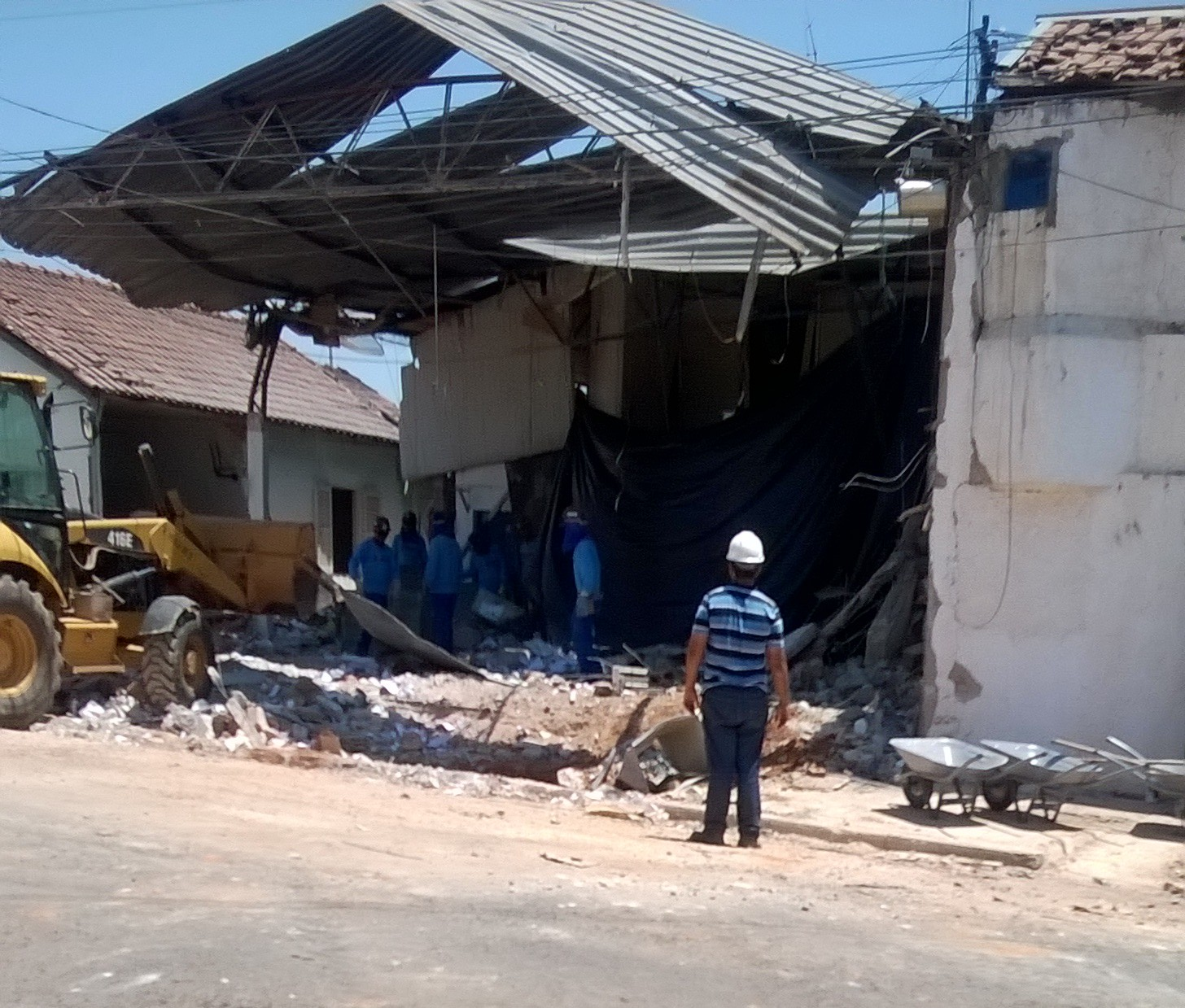
Damaged facilities of a valuables transport company following a Novo Cangaço attack in Araçatuba in 2017.

Novo Cangaço or neocangaço (lit. "new cangaço") is a type of crime in Brazil that emerged in the end of the 1990s and consists of gangs temporarily seizing control of small towns in order to commit robberies.

== History ==
The term "neocangaço" derives from similarities with traditional cangaço dating back to the early 20th century.

It emerged in the end of the 1990s, when gangs started to invade cities in the sertão, which lacked proper police forces, in order to rob banks and armored cars. These acts were usually violent and ended up in intense shootouts which could leave police and civilian casualties.

The main leader of Novo Cangaço was José Valdetário Benevides, also known as Valdetário Carneiro, who lead dozens of major attacks in Rio Grande do Norte until his death in 2003 in a confrontation with the police.

According to Thadeu Brandão, coordinator of the Rio Grande do Norte Violence Observatory (Obvio, in the Portuguese acronym) and Sociology professor at the Universidade Federal Rural do Semi-Árido, the neocangaço was mainly connected to a cycle of revenge, family conflicts and vigilantism towards the police, with Benevides at one point being known to distribute money to some people.

According to Brandão, there are similarities between these crimes and the ones committed in Southeastern cities in recent years, although these are more in terms of modus operandi than criminal profile. More modern examples of Novo Cangaço are usually perpetrated by criminals looking for financial gain, while original neocangaço criminals were supposedly looking to prove their honor through crime.

In the state of Mato Grosso, an association named Associação Mato-Grossense para o Fomento e Desenvolvimento da Segurança (Mato Grosso Association for the Nourishment and Development of Security) was created to study the Novo Cangaço criminal acts.

=== Notable examples ===
- July 2020 – three bank branches attacked in Botucatu, São Paulo, with two police officers injured and one suspect killed.
- December 2020 – two branches attacked in Araraquara, São Paulo; around 40 heavily armed men attacked another branch inCriciúma, Santa Catarina, leaving one officer injured.
- April 2021 – an attack in Mococa, São Paulo.
- August 2021 – another attack in Araçatuba, involving three branches and leaving three casualties and five injured. This attackk involved the largest number of explosives in Brazilian history.
- 31 October 2021 – Minas Gerais Políce and the Federal Highway Police kill 26 suspects of trying to attack a bank in the town of Varginha.
- April 2022 – Over 30 highly armed suspects attempted to rob an armored car in Guarapuava, Paraná.
- 8 April 2025 2 a.m. in Guaxupé, Minas Gerais, a group used bombs to rob a bank and used heavy weapons to prevent a police response by attacking local police bases.

== Characteristics ==
According to Guaracy Mingardi, a criminal researcher and member of the Brazilian Public Security Forum, Novo Cangaço started in the Northeast of Brazil with criminals attacking small, isolated mining towns. They would often attack the city, immobilize the local police force and leave. They then migrated to attacks against armored cars in the Southeast and Paraguay, but such heists were becoming less and less worth the effort due to increased security. The targeting of small towns is due to their limited police force, which is why such attacks rarely occur in large cities like São Paulo or Rio de Janeiro, where special forces, such as ROTA and BOPE respectively, may be deployed.

Another characteristic sought by criminals is a large sum of stored money, such as the bank branch in Araraquara, which served the treasure of the entire region.

Still according to Mingardi, gangs will often choose towns near important highways so they have easy access to proper escape routes. Attacks often begin with 30-40 heavily armed criminals blocking access to the city with arsoned vehicles. In the Araçatuba heist, the gang abandoned the cars they used as they carried out the attack and switched to other vehicles to flee from the scene.

According to Mingardi, such crimes are not planned by the Primeiro Comando da Capital (PCC), but by isolated members or people connected to them. The heavy guns used in such crimes are often leased by the organization in exchange for a share of the stolen money.

Crimes committed in the context of Novo Cangaço usually cause psychological trauma in the victims and disrupt essential services like schools, besides the possibility of leaving undetonated explosives behind.

== Prevention ==
According to Mingardi, the lack of deep investigations that identify and bring in the criminals behind these attacks enables further criminal activities. Each gang has at least four members who participated in similar attacks and while some learned how to commit such crimes in prison, practical experience is critical. Monitoring the relatively rare explosives especialists could help decrease this kind of robbery.
