= Rankings of universities in Brazil =

Universities in Brazil are ranked in a number of ways, including both national and international ranks.

== National Rankings ==
=== Ranking Universitário Folha ===
Since 2012, Brazil's largest newspaper Folha de S. Paulo has organized a national ranking of universities with criteria akin to those used by better known worldwide rankings: research, teaching, internationalization, innovation and market value.

2019	2016	2015	2012	University
1	2	1	1	USP - University of São Paulo
2	3	4	5	Unicamp - University of Campinas
3	1	2	3	UFRJ - Federal University of Rio de Janeiro
4	4	3	2	UFMG - Federal University of Minas Gerais
5	5	5	4	UFRGS - Federal University of Rio Grande do Sul
6	6	6	6	Unesp - São Paulo State University
7	8	7	9	UFSC - Federal University of Santa Catarina
8	7	8	7	UFPR - Federal University of Paraná
9	9	9	8	UnB - University of Brasília
10	12	10	10	UFPE - Federal University of Pernambuco
11	10	11	18	UFC - Federal University of Ceará
12	11	12	17	UFSCar - Federal University of São Carlos
13	13	14	11	UERJ - Rio de Janeiro State University
14	14*	15	12	UFBA - Federal University of Bahia
15	17	16	22	UFV - Federal University of Viçosa
16	16	22	14	UNIFESP - Federal University of São Paulo
17	14*	13	15	UFF - Fluminense Federal University
18	22	20	16	PUCRS - Pontifical Catholic University of Rio Grande do Sul
19	21	19	13	PUCRJ - Pontifical Catholic University of Rio de Janeiro
20	20	17	23	UFG - Federal University of Goiás
21	18	18	20	UFSM - Federal University of Santa Maria
22	23	25	21	UFRN - Federal University of Rio Grande do Norte
26	19	20*	38	UFJF - Federal University of Juiz de Fora

* tied.

=== Brazilian government evaluation ===
Higher education evaluations are also conducted by the Brazilian Government; specifically by Inep (Instituto Nacional de Estudos e Pesquisas Educacionais; English: National Institute of Studies and Research). The Government uses a General Index of Courses (Portuguese: Índice Geral de Cursos; IGC) to determine the quality of Brazilian's higher education (graduate and post-graduate courses) in Brazil. Universidade de São Paulo, one of the most prestigious universities in the country, has been participating in the IGC since 2013 as part of a technical cooperation with Inep that will last three years, during which time the results concerning the university's courses will not be disclosed. Only then will the university decide whether to fully participate in the government evaluation.

==== 2012 Índice Geral de Cursos ====
2012 rankings	University
1	UFRGS - Federal University of Rio Grande do Sul
2	UFLA - Federal University of Lavras
3	UFABC - Federal University of ABC
4	UNICAMP - University of Campinas
5	UFMG - Federal University of Minas Gerais
6	UFTM - Federal University of Triângulo Mineiro
7	UFSCar - Federal University of São Carlos
8	UFV - Federal University of Viçosa
9	UFCSPA - Federal University of Health Sciences of Porto Alegre
10	UFSC - Federal University of Santa Catarina
11	UNIFESP - Federal University of São Paulo
12	UENF - Darcy Ribeiro North Fluminense State University
13	UnB - University of Brasília
14	UFRJ - Federal University of Rio de Janeiro
15	UNESP - São Paulo State University
16	PUC-RIO - Pontifical Catholic University of Rio de Janeiro
17	UFSM - Federal University of Santa Maria
18	UDESC - University of the State of Santa Catarina
19	UFRN - Federal University of Rio Grande do Norte
20	UNIFAL-MG - Federal University of Alfenas
21	UFJF - Federal University of Juiz de Fora
22	UFG - Federal University of Goiás
23	UFPEL - Federal University of Pelotas
24	PUCSP - Pontifical Catholic University of São Paulo
25	UEL - State University of Londrina
26	UNIFEI - Federal University of Itajuba
27	UTFPR - Federal University of Technology – Paraná
28	UFPE - Federal University of Pernambuco
29	PUCRS - Pontifical Catholic University of Rio Grande do Sul
30	UEM - State University of Maringá

== World rankings ==
=== 2019 Academic Ranking of World Universities ===
World Rank	Institution
101-150	University of São Paulo
301-400	Federal University of Rio de Janeiro
301-400	São Paulo State University
301-400	University of Campinas
401-500	Federal University of Minas Gerais
401-500	Federal University of Rio Grande do Sul
501-600	Federal University of Paraná
601-700	Federal University of Goiás
601-700	Federal University of Santa Catarina
601-700	Federal University of São Paulo
601-700	Universidade Federal de Pelotas
701-800	Federal University of São Carlos
701-800	Federal University of Viçosa
701-800	University of Brasília
801-900	Federal University of Ceará
801-900	Federal University of Pernambuco
801-900	Federal University of Rio Grande do Norte
801-900	Federal University of Santa Maria
901-1000	Federal University of Bahia
901-1000	Federal University of Pará
901-1000	Fluminense Federal University
901-1000	Rio de Janeiro State University
901-1000	Universidade Federal de Mato Grosso do Sul

=== 2020 QS World University Rankings ===
World Rank	Institution
116	University of São Paulo
214	University of Campinas
358	Federal University of Rio de Janeiro
439	Federal University of São Paulo
482	São Paulo State University
601-650	Pontifical Catholic University of Rio de Janeiro
651-700	Pontifical Catholic University of São Paulo
651-700	Federal University of Minas Gerais
651-700	Federal University of Rio Grande do Sul
701-750	Federal University of Santa Catarina
801-1000	Pontifical Catholic University of Rio Grande do Sul
801-1000	University of Brasília
801-1000	Rio de Janeiro State University
801-1000	State University of Londrina
801-1000	Federal University of São Carlos
801-1000	Federal University of Viçosa
801-1000	Federal University of Paraná
801-1000	Federal University of Pernambuco
801-1000	Fluminense Federal University

=== 2020 Times Higher Education World University Rankings ===
World Rank	Institution
251–300	University of São Paulo
501–600	University of Campinas
601–800	Federal University of Minas Gerais
601–800	Federal University of Rio Grande do Sul
601–800	Federal University of Santa Catarina
601–800	Federal University of São Paulo
601–800	Pontifical Catholic University of Rio de Janeiro
801–1000	University of Brasília
801–1000	Federal University of Pelotas
801–1000	Federal University of Rio de Janeiro
801–1000	Pontifical Catholic University of Rio Grande do Sul
801–1000	São Paulo State University
1001+	University of Caxias do Sul
1001+	Ceará State University
1001+	Federal University of ABC
1001+	Federal University of Alagoas
1001+	Federal University of Bahia
1001+	Federal University of Ceará
1001+	Federal University of Espírito Santo
1001+	Federal University of Goiás
1001+	Federal University of Health Sciences of Porto Alegre
1001+	Federal University of Itajubá
1001+	Federal University of Lavras
1001+	Federal University of Mato Grosso do Sul
1001+	Federal University of Ouro Preto
1001+	Federal University of Pará
1001+	Federal University of Paraná
1001+	Federal University of Pernambuco
1001+	Federal University of Rio Grande do Norte
1001+	Federal Rural University of the Semi-Arid Region
1001+	Federal University of Santa Maria
1001+	Federal University of São Carlos
1001+	Federal University of Technology – Paraná
1001+	Federal University of Viçosa
1001+	Fluminense Federal University
1001+	University of Fortaleza
1001+	Londrina State University
1001+	Pontifical Catholic University of Minas Gerais
1001+	Pontifical Catholic University of Paraná
1001+	Rio de Janeiro State University
1001+	Santa Catarina State University
1001+	University of Vale do Rio dos Sinos
1001+	State University of Maringá
1001+	State University of Ponta Grossa
1001+	State University of Santa Cruz
1001+	State University of Western Paraná

== See also ==
- Universities and higher education in Brazil
- College and university rankings
