= Federal University of São João del-Rei =

University in Brazil

- Universidade Federal de São João del-Rei
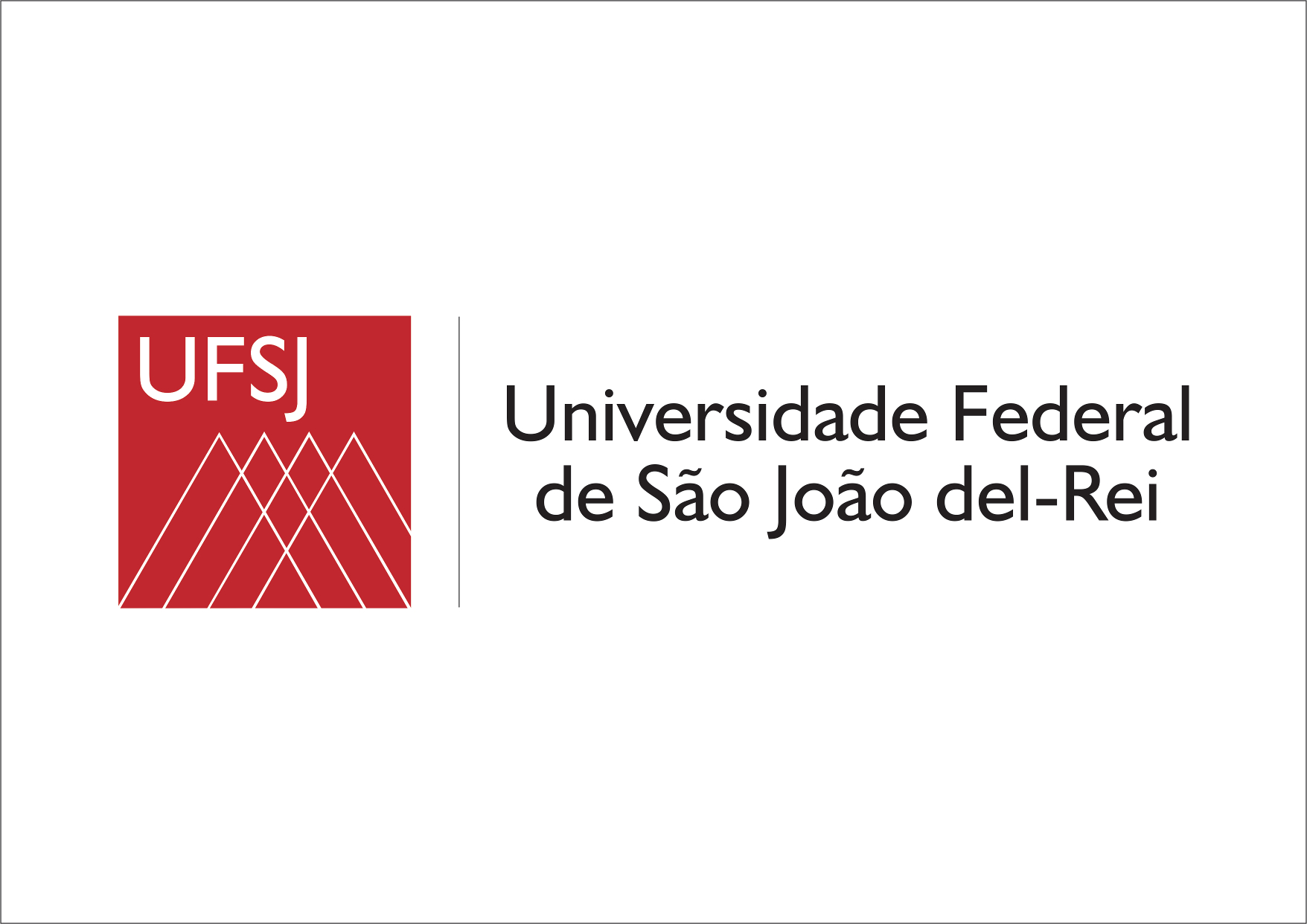
- University's Flag
- Other names: UFSJ
- Type: Public
- Established: 1987
- Budget: R$ 344.173.658,00 (2020)
- Chancellor: Marcelo Pereira de Andrade
- Vice-Chancellor: Rosy Iara Maciel de Azambuja Ribeiro
- Administrative staff: 1,321
- Undergraduates: 13,979
- Postgraduates: 580
- Location: São João del-Rei, Minas Gerais, Brazil
- Campus: São João del-Rei (Campus Santo Antônio) São João del-Rei (Campus Dom Bosco) São João del-Rei (Campus Tancredo Neves) Divinópolis (Campus Centro-Oeste "Dona Lindu") Ouro Branco (Campus Alto Paraopeba) Sete Lagoas (Campus Sete Lagoas)

The Federal University of São João del-Rei (Portuguese: Universidade Federal de São João del-Rei, UFSJ) is a Brazilian university in the city of São João del-Rei in the state of Minas Gerais. It has other campuses in the cities of Ouro Branco, Divinópolis and Sete Lagoas, all of them in the state of Minas Gerais.

It was founded as a school in 1987 and reorganized as a university in 2002. The university offers over 30 bachelor's degree programs and more than 20 graduate degree programs.

== History ==
The university was created by the law 7,555 of 28 December 1986 with the name of São João del-Rei College Foundation (Fundação de Ensino Superior de São João del-Rei), also called FUNREI. It was the result of the union of three colleges: Dom Bosco College of Philosophy, Science and Languages (Faculdade Dom Bosco de Filosofia, Ciências e Letras), College of Economics, Business and Accounting (Faculdade de Ciências Econômicas, Administrativas e Contábeis) and College of Industrial Engineering (Faculdade de Engenharia Industrial).

FUNREI became a university through the law 10,425, of 19 of April 2002 and it was called Federal University of São João del-Rei. UFSJ is the common accepted abbreviation.

== Organization ==
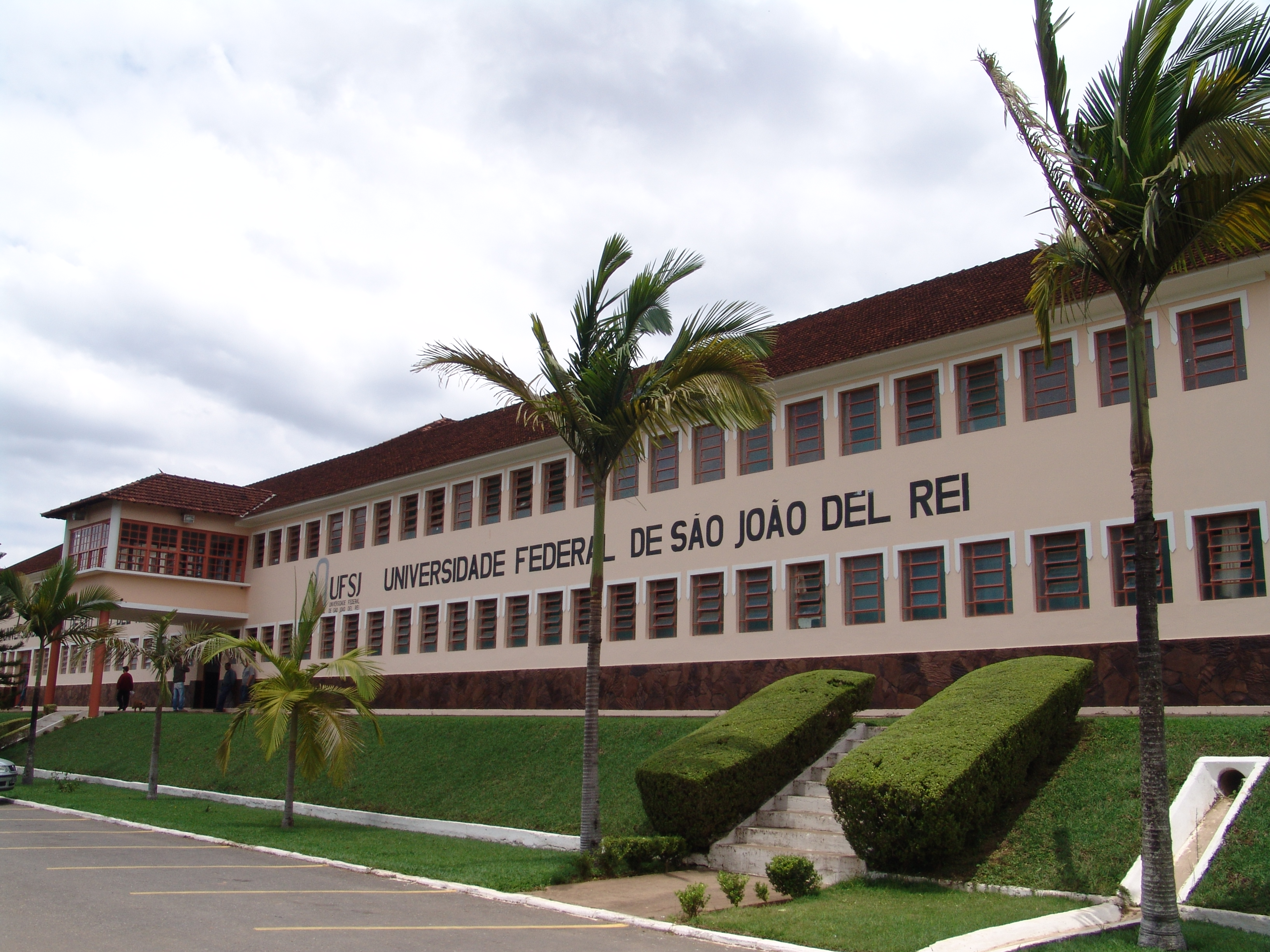
Tancredo Neves campus in São João Del-Rei

UFSJ consists of six campuses and five special units. The campuses and special unities are property of UFSJ or are under its responsibility.

- Campus Alto Paraopeba (CAP) - Ouro Branco
- Campus Centro-Oeste "Dona Lindu" (CCO) - Divinópolis
- Campus Dom Bosco (CDB) - São João del-Rei
- Campus Santo Antônio (CSA) - São João del-Rei
- Campus Sete Lagoas (CSL) - Sete Lagoas
- Campus Tancredo Neves (CTAn) - São João del-Rei
- Fortim dos Emboabas - São João del-Rei
- Solar da Baronesa (Centro Cultural da UFSJ) - São João del-Rei
- Musicological Reference Center José Maria Neves (Centro de Referência Musicológica José Maria Neves) (CEREM) - São João del-Rei
- Experimental Farm Boa Esperança (Fazenda Experimental Boa Esperança) - São Miguel do Cajuru, São João del-Rei
- Experimental Farm Granja Manoa (Fazenda Experimental Granja Manoa) - Jequitibá

== Undergraduate programs ==
The undergraduate programs are divided among the campuses as follows:

=== Campus Alto Paraopeba ===
- Interdisciplinary bachelor's degree of Science and Technology
- Bachelor of Bioprocess Engineering
- Bachelor of Telecommunication Engineering
- Bachelor of Construction Engineering, with emphasis on Metallic Structures
- Bachelor of Mechatronics
- Bachelor of Chemical Engineering

=== Campus "Dona Lindu" ===
- Bachelor of Biochemistry
- Bachelor of Nursing
- Bachelor of Pharmacy
- Bachelor of Medicine

=== Campus Dom Bosco ===
- Bachelor and Licentiate of Biology Sciences
- Bachelor and Licentiate of Philosophy
- Bachelor and Licentiate of Physics
- Bachelor and Licentiate of History
- Licentiate of English Language
- Licentiate of Portuguese Language
- Bachelor of Medicine
- Licentiate of Pedagogy
- Bachelor of Psychology
- Bachelor and Licentiate of Chemistry

=== Campus Santo Antônio ===
- Bachelor of Industrial Engineering
- Bachelor of Electrical Engineering
- Bachelor of Mechanical Engineering
- Licentiate of Mathematics

=== Campus Tancredo Neves ===
- Bachelor of Economic Sciences
- Bachelor of Business
- Bachelor of Architecture and Urbanism
- Bachelor of Arts, with emphasis on Pottery
- Bachelor of Computer Science
- Bachelor of Accounting
- Bachelor of Social Communication (Journalism)
- Licentiate of Physical Education
- Bachelor and Licentiate of Geography
- Licentiate of Music
- Bachelor and Licentiate of Fine Arts
- Bachelor of Animal Husbandry

=== Campus Sete Lagoas ===
- Interdisciplinary bachelor's degree of Biosystems
- Bachelor of Agronomic Engineering
- Bachelor of Food Engineering
- Bachelor of Forestry Engineering

== Graduate programs ==
The university has several graduate programs as follows:

=== Campus Alto Paraopeba ===
- Master of Sustainable Development Technology
- Master of Chemical Engineering

=== Campus Centro-Oeste "Dona Lindu" ===
- Master of Biochemistry and Molecular Biology
- PhD of Biochemistry and Molecular Biology
- Master of Biotechnology
- Master of Health Sciences
- PhD of Health Sciences
- Master of Pharmaceutical Sciences
- Master of Nursing

=== Campus Dom Bosco ===
- Master of Bioengineering
- PhD of Bioengineering
- Master of Ecology
- Master of Education
- Master of Physics (associated with the Federal University of Lavras and Federal University of Alfenas)
- Master of Physics and Chemistry of Materials
- PhD of Physics and Chemistry of Materials
- Master of History
- Master of Languages
- Master of Psychology
- Master of Chemistry
- PhD of Chemistry

=== Campus Santo Antônio ===
- Master of Energy Engineering (associated with Cefet-MG)
- Master of Electrical Engineering (associated with Cefet-MG)
- Master of Mechanical Engineering
- Master of Mathematics

=== Campus Sete Lagoas ===
- Master of Agricultural Science

=== Campus Tancredo Neves ===
- Master of Geography
- Master Of Music
- Master of Computer Science
- Master of Interdisciplinary Program in Arts, Urbanities and Sustainability

== Directors ==
Executive directors and chancellors of the Federal University of São João del-Rei:

Order	Name	University of origin	Period	Title	Vice
1	João Bosco de Castro Teixeira	Federal University of Uberlândia	April 21, 1987 to September 22, 1990	Chancellor	----
2	João Bosco de Castro Teixeira	Federal University of São João del-Rei - Department of Philosophy	September 22, 1990 to August 19, 1994	Chancellor	Magda Mara Assis
3	José Raimundo Facion	Federal University of São João del-Rei - Department of Psychology	August 19, 1994 to August 19, 1998	Chancellor	Frederico Ozanan Neves
4	Antônio Lima Bandeira	Federal University of Viçosa	August 20, 1998 to September 23, 1998	Chancellor	-----
5	Mário Neto Borges	Federal University of São João del-Rei - Department of Electrical Engineering	September 24, 1998 to April 19, 2002	Chancellor	Maria do Carmo Narciso Silva Gonçalves
6	Mário Neto Borges	Federal University of São João del-Rei - Department of Electrical Engineering	April 19, 2002 to August 5, 2004	Chancellor	Maria do Carmo Narciso Silva Gonçalves
7	Helvécio Luiz Reis	Federal University of São João del-Rei - Department of Business and Accounting	August 6, 2004 to August 7, 2008	Chancellor	Wlamir José da Silva
8	Helvécio Luiz Reis	Federal University of São João del-Rei - Department of Business and Accounting	August 8, 2008 to July 5, 2012	Chancellor	Valéria Heloísa Kemp
9	Valéria Heloísa Kemp	Federal University of São João del-Rei - Department of Psychology	July 6, 2012 to May 8, 2016	Chancellor	Sérgio Augusto Araújo da Gama Cerqueira
10	Sérgio Augusto Araújo da Gama Cerqueira	Federal University of São João del-Rei - Department of Mechanical Engineering	May 9, 2016 to May 8, 2020	Chancellor	Marcelo Pereira de Andrade
11	Marcelo Pereira de Andrade	Federal University of São João del-Rei - Department of Physical Activity Sciences, Health and Sports (DCAFIS)	May 9, 2020 to present	Chancellor	Rosy Iara Maciel de Azambuja Ribeiro
Color	Meaning				
Green	Elected				
Yellow	Appointed Position				
