= Federal University for Latin American Integration =

Public federal university in Foz do Iguaçu, Paraná

Coordinates: 25°29′41″S 54°33′48″W

- Universidade Federal da Integração Latino-Americana
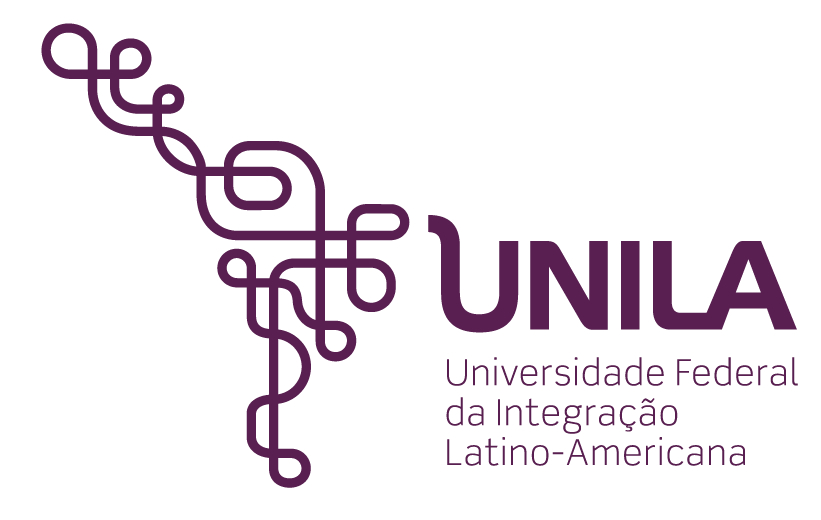
- logo
- Other names: UNILA
- Motto: Uma Universidade Sem Fronteiras
- Motto in English: A University without borders
- Type: Public
- Established: January 12, 2010
- Endowment: R$ 156.240.651,00 (2016)
- Rector: Diana Araujo Pereira
- Undergraduates: 3.056
- Postgraduates: 472
- Location: Foz do Iguaçu, Paraná, Brazil
- Website: unila.edu.br

The Federal University for Latin American Integration (Portuguese: Universidade Federal da Integração Latino-americana, UNILA) is a public university located in the Brazilian city of Foz do Iguaçu, Paraná, at the tri-national border shared by Brazil, Argentina and Paraguay. UNILA emphasises natural resources, social studies and language, international relations and areas considered important for development and regional integration.

UNILA is a bilingual university, where Portuguese and Spanish are used.

== History ==
Luiz Inácio da Silva, Brazil's former president, proposed the University creation in 2007, however it was created only on January 12, 2010 on the border between Brazil, Argentina and Paraguay.

UNILA was the thirteenth university inaugurated by the Lula Government, and had its first class of 200 students among Brazilians, Paraguayans, Uruguayans and Argentines in August 2010, with an estimated investment of approximately 550 million reais, a portentous construction expected to end in 2014, with the architectural design of the famous Brazilian architect Oscar Niemeyer.

It is connected to the network of federal universities in Brazil. Its mission is to contribute to Latin American integration, with emphasis on Mercosur, through technical cooperation among universities, government agencies and international.

== Courses ==
=== Undergraduate ===
- Biological Sciences
- Economic Sciences
- Social and Political Sciences
- Engineering Physics
- Materials Engineering
- Energy Engineering
- Civil Engineering of Infrastructure
- Architecture
- International Relations and Integration
- Cinema and Audiovisual

=== Postgraduate ===
- Biosciences
- Neotropical Biodiversity
- Economics
- Civil Engineering
- Applied Physics
- History
- Contemporary Latin American Integration
- Latin American Studies
- Comparative Literature
- International Relations

== See also ==
- List of universities in Brazil
- Brazil University Rankings
- Universities and Higher Education in Brazil
- Universidade da Integração Internacional da Lusofonia Afro-Brasileira
