= List of public universities in Brazil =

The following is a partial list of public universities in Brazil.

== Supported by municipal governments ==
- Fundação Educacional do Município de Assis
- Municipal University of São Caetano do Sul
- Universidade de Taubaté

== See also ==
- List of universities in Brazil by state
- Rankings of universities in Brazil
- Universities and higher education in Brazil
