= Fontoura (surname) =

Fontoura is a surname. Notable people with the surname include:

- Adelino Fontoura (1859–1884), Brazilian poet, actor, and journalist
- Antônio Vicente da Fontoura (1807–1860), Brazilian statesman
- Ary Fontoura (born 1933), Brazilian actor, writer, director, poet, and television presenter
- Diogo Augusto Pacheco da Fontoura (born 1980), commonly known as nickname Diogo Rincón or just Rincón, Brazilian footballer
- Marcus Fontoura (fl. from 1999), Brazilian-American computer scientist and author
- Talita Fontoura Alves (born 1966), Brazilian botanist, denoted as Fontoura when citing a botanical name
