= Talita Fontoura Alves =

Brazilian botanist and ecologist

- Born: 1966 (age 59–60)
- Education: University of Campinas
- Scientific career
- Fields: Botany
- Thesis: Distribuição geográfica, forófitos e espécies de bromélias epífitas nas matas e plantações de cacau da região de Una, Bahia (2005)
- Doctoral advisor: Flavio Antonio Maes dos Santos

Talita Fontoura Alves (Note: According to the custom of Portuguese names, "Fontoura" denotes the maternal surname and "Alves" the paternal.) (b. 1966) is a Brazilian botanist. She is a professor of biology and botany at the State University of Santa Cruz in Ilhéus, Brazil. She is notable for the discovery and naming of Quesnelia alborosea, a member of the Bromeliaceae native to the Bahia area of Brazil.

== Biography ==
In 1988, Fontoura obtained her licentiate from the Universidade Santa Úrsula in Rio de Janeiro. She obtained her master's degree in ecology under the supervision of Dr. Fábio Rúbio Scarano at the University of Campinas in 1995, and finally her Doctorate in 2005, also at the University of Campinas. To finish her education, she conducted her postdoctoral studies at Federal University of Rio de Janeiro.

Since 1996, she has tenured as a professor at the State University of Santa Cruz in Ilhéus, Bahia, and continues to contribute to the fields of ecology in biodiversity and conservation. Her field of research is the structure and community of epiphytes. She has begun research on Bromeliaceae at the Rio de Janeiro Botanical Garden into the different aspects of that family of plants such as their phytogeography and frugivory.
