= Centro Universitário de Brasília =

Private university in Brazil

University Center of Brasília
- Centro Universitário de Brasília
- Type: Private university
- Established: 1968
- Students: 17,000
- Location: Brasília, Federal District, Brazil
- Campus: Urban
- Colors: Red, black, white, gray, and yellow
- Website: www.uniceub.br

The University Center of Brasília (Portuguese: Centro Universitário de Brasília, UNICEUB) is a private university located in Brasília, the capital of Brazil. It is third largest University in Brasília.

To join the university they must pass a biannual "vestibular".

== History ==
UNICEUB was created on 1968, it was offered four courses: Administration, Accounting, Laws, and History. From that date onwards, new courses were created to meet the scientific and cultural needs of society.

During this period of activity, the following courses were offered: Architecture, Education, Medicine, Psychology Civil Engineering, Nursery, International Relations, Biology and others.

== Student life ==
The university has 37 undergraduate courses, and two postgraduate courses: Law and Psychology. UNICEUB have three campuses: two in Brasília and one in the region of Taguatinga.

== See also ==
- Brazil university rankings
- Universities and higher education in Brazil
