= University of Itaúna =

Private university in Itaúna, Minas Gerais, Brazil

- Universidade de Itaúna
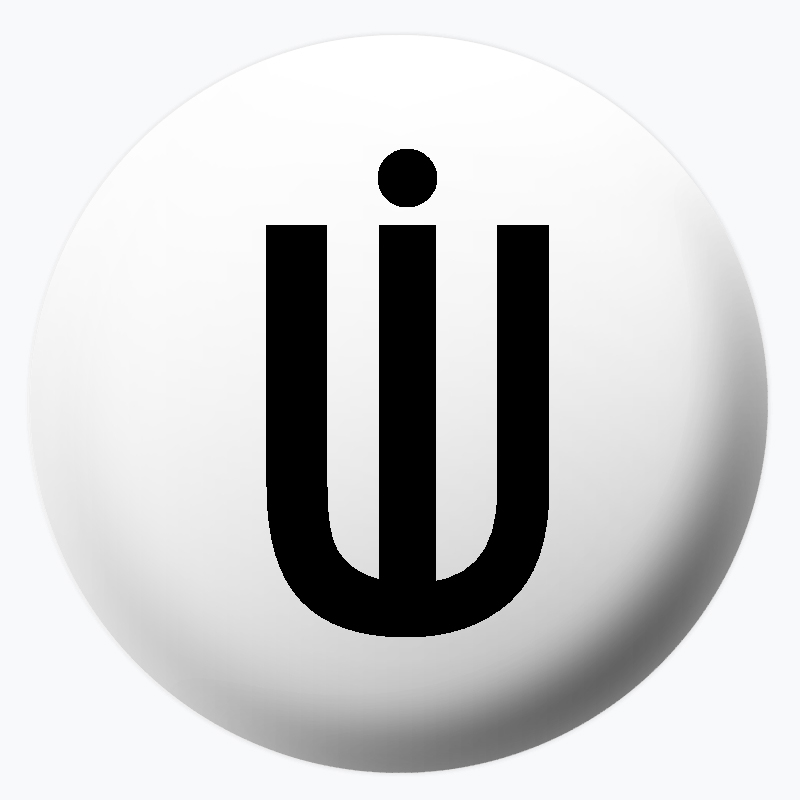
- Motto: Uma grande universidade
- Motto in English: A great university
- Type: Private
- Established: 1965 (as college); 2005 (as university)
- Rector: Faiçal David Freire Chequer
- Location: Itaúna; Almenara; Lagoa da Prata, Minas Gerais, Brazil; 20°03′24″S 44°34′21″W
- Campus: Suburban
- Website: www.uit.edu.br
- Location within Brazil Minas Gerais Location within Brazil

University of Itaúna (Portuguese: Universidade de Itaúna, abbreviated UI) is a private university from Itaúna, Minas Gerais, Brazil. It also has campuses at Almenara and Lagoa da Prata.
