= Teresina =

Capital city of Piauí, Brazil

- Municipality
- Municipality of Teresina
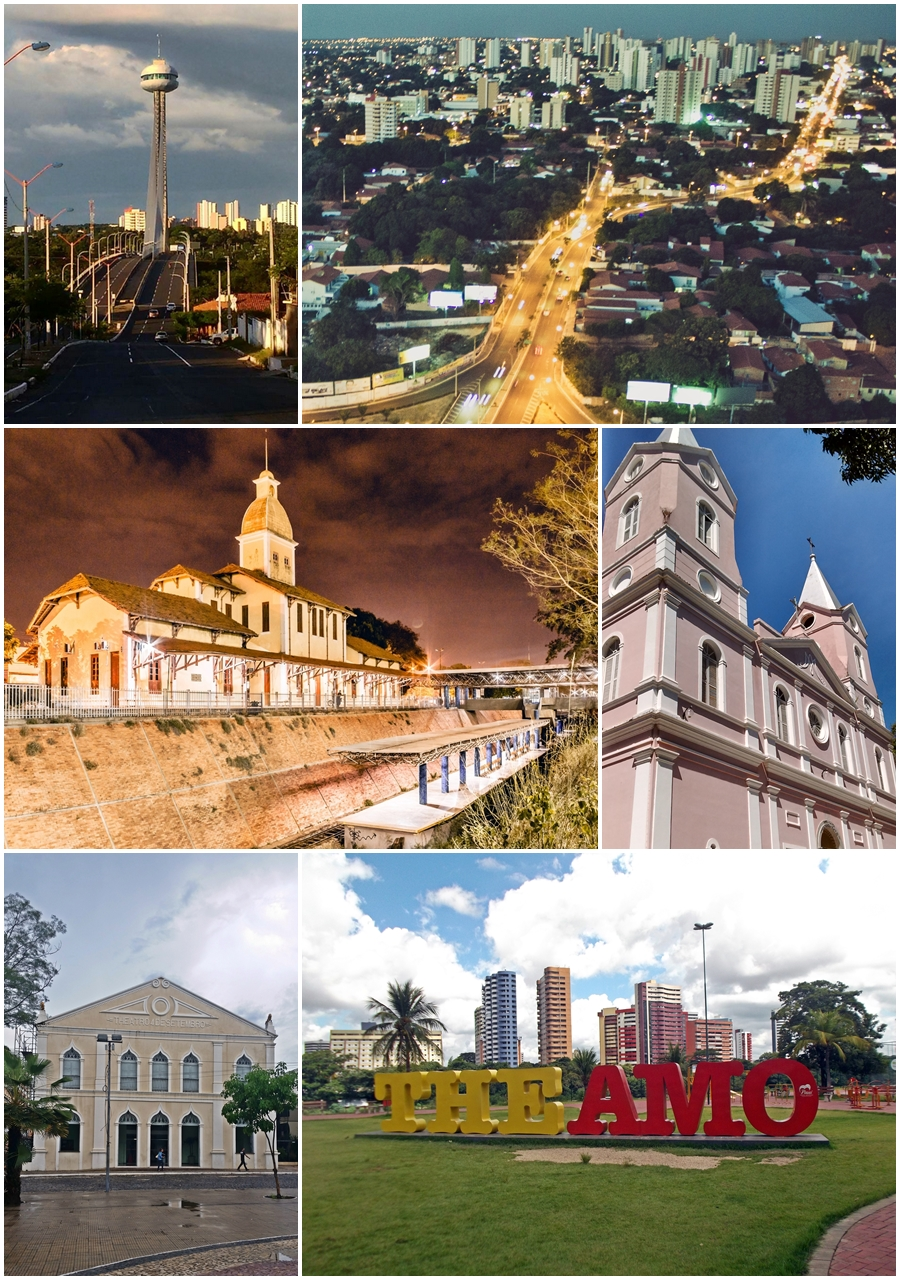
- From the top: Estaiada Mirante bridge, Teresina at night, Railway station complex, Cathedral of Our Lady of Sorrows, September 4th Theater and tourist signboard

- Flag Coat of arms
- Nicknames: Capital do Sol e da Luz (Capital of Sun and Light), Cidade Verde (Green City), Mesopotâmia Brasileira (Brazilian Mesopotamia) and THE.
- Motto: Omnia in Charitate
- Location of Teresina in the State of Piauí

- Location in Brazil
- Coordinates: 5°05′25″S 42°49′00″W
- Country: Brazil
- Region: Northeast
- State: Piauí
- Founded: August 16, 1852

Government
  - Mayor: Sílvio Mendes

Area
  - Municipality: 1,167.25 km^{2} (450.68 sq mi)
  - Urban: 1,755 km^{2} (678 sq mi)
- Elevation: 87 m (285 ft)

Population (2025)
  - Municipality: 905,692
  - Estimate (2026): 917,154
  - Rank: 21st in Brazil
  - Density: 775.919/km^{2} (2,009.62/sq mi)
  - Urban: 1,088,403
  - Metro: 1,219,305
  - Seat/Locality: 821,364
- Demonym: teresinense (teresenian)
- Time zone: UTC-03:00 (BRT)
- Postal code: 64000-001 to 64099-999
- Area code: +55 86
- HDI (2010): 0.751 – high
- Website: www.teresina.pi.gov.br

Teresina is the capital and most populous municipality in the Brazilian state of Piauí. Being located in north-central Piauí 366 km from the coast, it is the only capital in the Brazilian Northeast that is not located on the shores of the Atlantic Ocean. With 902,644 inhabitants, Teresina is the 19th largest city in Brazil, and the 16th largest state capital in the country. Together with Timon in the neighbouring state of Maranhão, it forms a conurbation with a population of about 2,729,527 inhabitants; the entire metropolitan region of Teresina has over 2,893,729 inhabitants. The only natural barrier that separates Teresina from Timon is the Parnaíba River, one of the largest in the Northeast.

Teresina is the capital with the best quality of life in the North-Northeast according to FIRJAN and the fourth in Brazil. It is among the 50 cities in the world with the highest murder rates, with 315 homicides in 2017.

Its motto is the Latin phrase Omnia in Charitatis, which means, in English, "All for charity". The city is the birthplace of, among others, Torquato Neto, who belonged to the Tropicalismo movement.

Its cathedral, Catedral Metropolitana Nossa Senhora das Dores, dedicated to Our Lady of Sorrows, is the archiepiscopal see of the Roman Catholic Archdiocese of Teresina.

== History and names ==
Teresina, 1975. National Archives of Brazil.

Teresina was founded on August 16, 1852, under the name of Vila Nova do Poty (because its origin is linked to the Poti river) as the capital of the state of Piauí. It was the first planned city in the Brazil and the only northeast capital located out of the coast. Until 1852, Oeiras was the capital of the Piauí Captaincy. However, due to difficulties in communication and trade, the capital was transferred to an area next to the Parnaíba River, to the other cities and to the sea coast. Colonization of the area where Teresina is now located dates back to the 18th century. The chosen place was a small community of fishermen, in 1760, nearby Poty and Panaíba rivers, which grew into a village called "Vila do Poty", but, due to the inundation of the Parnaíba River riverbanks, the city had to be built in a higher position.

In the 19th century, it was initially called Vila Nova do Poty, but later the city was renamed Teresina, in honor of Empress Teresa Cristina, the wife of Emperor Pedro II of Brazil.

Teresina is the hottest city in the country and the city with the third-highest incidence of lightning in the world. Nowadays, Teresina's economy is based on international manufacturing industries and trade.

== Main sights ==
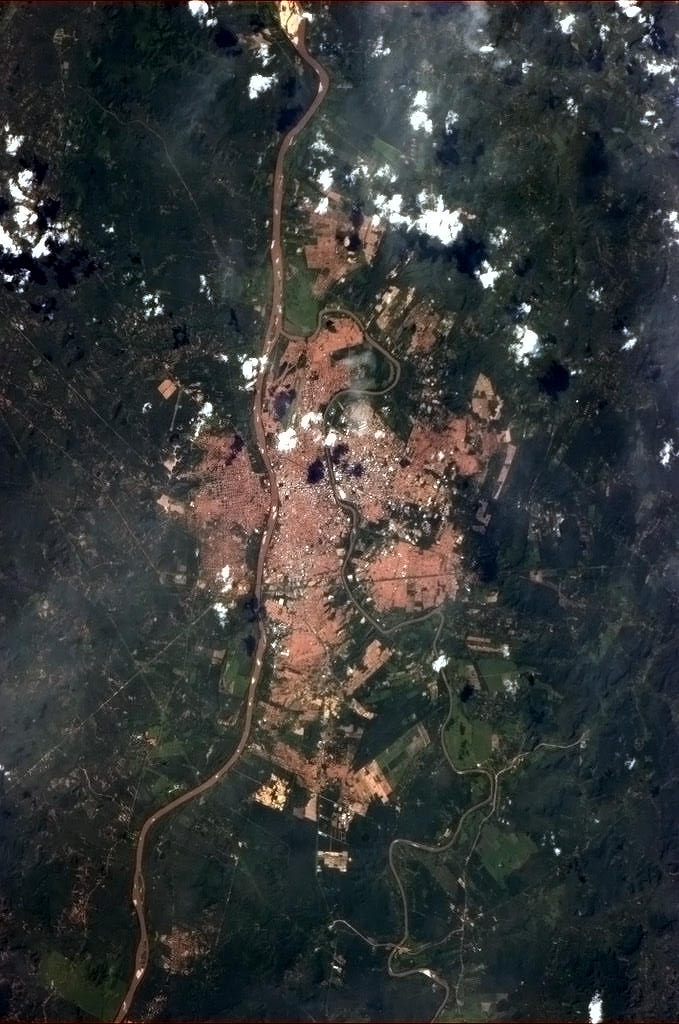
Teresina pictured from the International Space Station

Sights include:

- Casa da Cultura de Teresina, exhibiting elements of the culture of the city, and home to cultural events
- Centro Artesanal "Master Dezinho", home to handcrafts made of various materials, mainly clay, decorated with paintings;
- Teatro 4 de Setembro, a theatre holding cultural shows, plays and others;
- Mirante da Ponte Estaiada "João Isidoro França"
- Encontro dos Rios, a natural place by the riverside Parnaíba and Poti.
- Parque Zoobotânico, a zoo with typical animals of the Brazilian fauna and other countries.
- Igreja de São Benedito, the main Catholic church of the city
- Museu do Piaui, with numerous elements of the history of Teresina and of Piauí in general, including antiques, furniture and documents.

== Geography ==
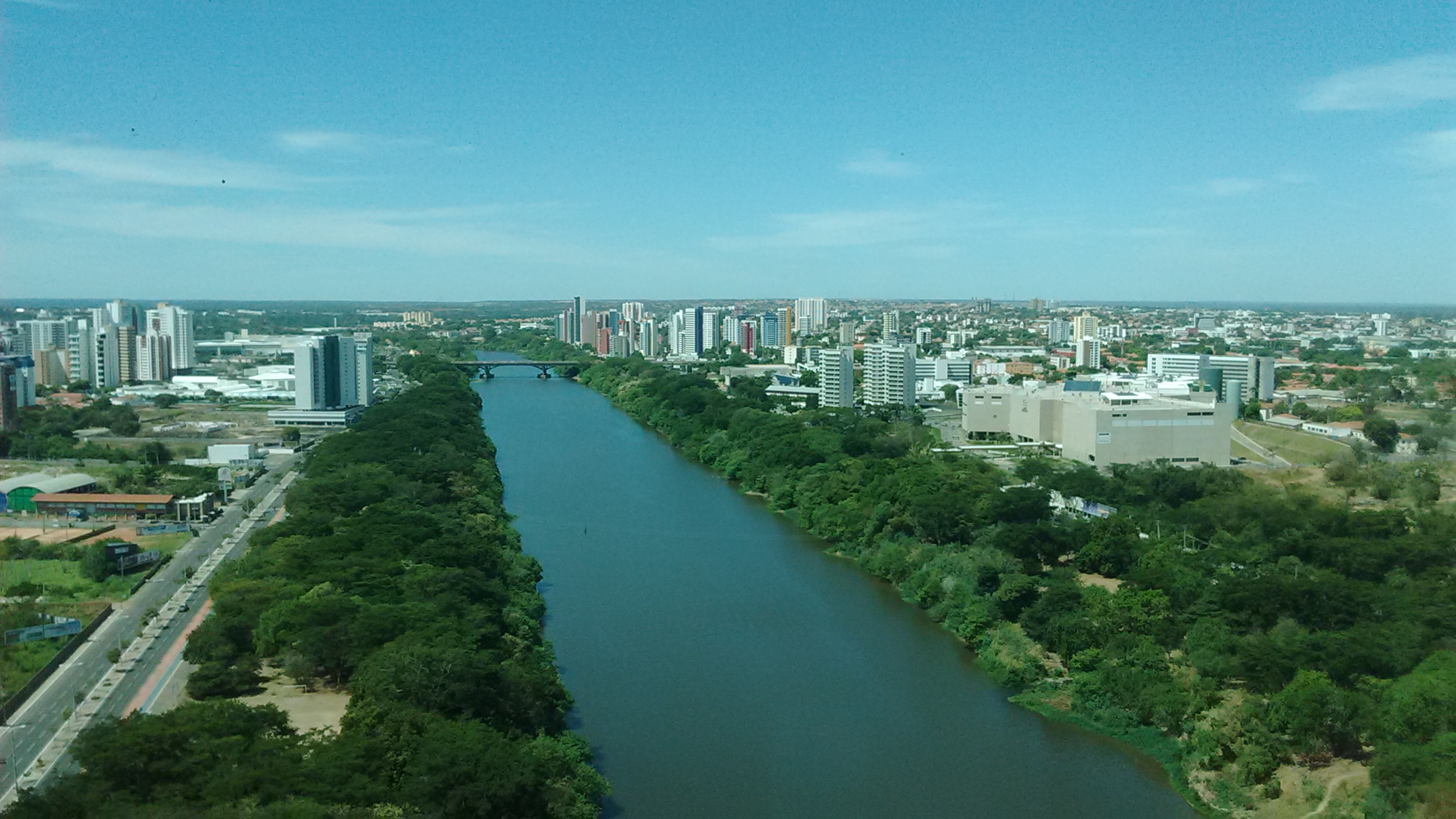
Teresina seen from João Isidoro França Bridge Observatory.

Teresina is located on the east side of the Parnaíba River at the border with Maranhão state, at an altitude of about 72 meters. The city faces the city of Timon across the river and is situated between the Parnaíba River and its tributary the Poti River. The two rivers join at the city's northern end, where there is an environmental park with gazebos. Teresina is the largest capital in the northeastern territorial extension, at 1,756 km^{2}.

Located in a transition zone between the northeast and the Amazon (Mid-North), Teresina is surrounded by mata dos cocais, savannas and cerradões where many carnaúba, babaçu, buriti palms, jatobás, ipês, and many other medium-sized trees can be seen. In the region there are also remnants of Teresina Atlantic Forest, which makes the landscape shrub coverage very rich and dense.

=== Climate ===
Teresina has a tropical wet and dry climate (Köppen climate classification: Aw) with semi-humid characteristics and two seasons: the rainy season (which occurs in summer and autumn of the Southern Hemisphere) and the dry season (which occurs in winter and spring).

From January to May, due to the rains, the weather is hot and wet (likely to occur when there is fog in the morning), while from June to August the climate gets dry with relatively milder nights; in September to December the weather becomes hotter and humid decreases, with the gradual return of rainy conditions from October. This period is referred to as "Bro" by locals as the hottest months end with -bro in Portuguese: setembro, outubro, novembro, and dezembro. A peculiar feature of the rains in the city are their speed and intensity, with strong winds, large force of water and very common lightning. The annual rainfall stands at around 1,325 millimetres or 52 inches. The highest recorded daily precipitation was 125 millimetres (5 in).

Hot most of the year, Teresina has an average temperature around 27 °C or 80.6 °F, with a minimum of 20 °C or 68 °F in July and a maximum of 36 °C or 96.8 °F in October. The lowest ever recorded in Teresina was 11.9 °C or 53.4 °F in June, while the record hot temperature exceeds 40 °C or 104 °F (October and November). Annually, there are approximately 129.4 days in which the maximum daily temperature reaches or exeeds 35 °C (95 °F). These fluctuations are mitigated by the contribution of the winds. Air quality is considered good in Teresina, except in the driest period, when the relative humidity drops, and there are occurrences of fires.

Climate data for Teresina (1991–2020 normals, extremes 1961–present)
| Month | Jan | Feb | Mar | Apr | May | Jun | Jul | Aug | Sep | Oct | Nov | Dec | Year |
|---|---|---|---|---|---|---|---|---|---|---|---|---|---|
| Record high °C (°F) | 38.4 (101.1) | 38.0 (100.4) | 39.6 (103.3) | 35.0 (95.0) | 35.8 (96.4) | 36.9 (98.4) | 37.6 (99.7) | 38.4 (101.1) | 41.0 (105.8) | 41.6 (106.9) | 40.8 (105.4) | 39.5 (103.1) | 41.6 (106.9) |
| Mean daily maximum °C (°F) | 32.5 (90.5) | 32.2 (90.0) | 32.0 (89.6) | 31.9 (89.4) | 32.3 (90.1) | 32.7 (90.9) | 33.7 (92.7) | 35.5 (95.9) | 36.9 (98.4) | 37.4 (99.3) | 36.4 (97.5) | 35.0 (95.0) | 34.0 (93.3) |
| Mean daily minimum °C (°F) | 22.8 (73.0) | 22.7 (72.9) | 22.8 (73.0) | 22.9 (73.2) | 22.8 (73.0) | 21.6 (70.9) | 20.8 (69.4) | 20.9 (69.6) | 22.0 (71.6) | 23.3 (73.9) | 23.7 (74.7) | 23.4 (74.1) | 22.5 (72.4) |
| Record low °C (°F) | 19.8 (67.6) | 20.0 (68.0) | 18.5 (65.3) | 19.0 (66.2) | 19.4 (66.9) | 11.9 (53.4) | 15.0 (59.0) | 15.6 (60.1) | 17.7 (63.9) | 18.0 (64.4) | 19.0 (66.2) | 18.4 (65.1) | 11.9 (53.4) |
| Average precipitation mm (inches) | 205.9 (8.11) | 233.6 (9.20) | 292.0 (11.50) | 264.9 (10.43) | 114.7 (4.52) | 20.7 (0.81) | 12.6 (0.50) | 7.6 (0.30) | 11.3 (0.44) | 22.2 (0.87) | 44.8 (1.76) | 99.0 (3.90) | 1,329.3 (52.34) |
| Average precipitation days (≥ 1.0 mm) | 12 | 14 | 18 | 16 | 9 | 3 | 2 | 1 | 2 | 2 | 4 | 7 | 90 |
| Average relative humidity (%) | 80.2 | 83.6 | 85.1 | 85.4 | 83.4 | 76.9 | 69.4 | 61.8 | 56.6 | 56.2 | 61.8 | 69.8 | 72.5 |
| Average dew point °C (°F) | 23.8 (74.8) | 24.0 (75.2) | 24.1 (75.4) | 24.4 (75.9) | 24.1 (75.4) | 22.7 (72.9) | 21.2 (70.2) | 20.3 (68.5) | 20.4 (68.7) | 21.0 (69.8) | 21.9 (71.4) | 22.9 (73.2) | 22.6 (72.6) |
| Mean monthly sunshine hours | 191.0 | 169.1 | 189.4 | 198.7 | 239.7 | 262.2 | 284.0 | 305.3 | 286.9 | 287.5 | 249.8 | 226.3 | 2,889.9 |
| Mean daily daylight hours | 12.4 | 12.3 | 12.1 | 12.0 | 11.9 | 11.8 | 11.9 | 12.0 | 12.1 | 12.2 | 12.4 | 12.4 | 12.1 |
| Average ultraviolet index | 7 | 6 | 7 | 7 | 7 | 7 | 7 | 7 | 7 | 7 | 7 | 7 | 7 |
Source 1: NOAA
Source 2: Brazilian National Institute of Meteorology (INMET) Weather atlas(Daylight-UV)

== Demographics ==
According to the 2022 census, there was 866,300 people living in Teresina.

=== Religion ===
Religion in Teresina (2010)
1. Catholicism (78.9%)
2. Protestantism (13.3%)
3. Jehovah's Witnesses (0.89%)
4. Spiritism (0.85%)
5. Other (0.74%)
6. No religion (4.49%)

In 2010, 78.94% of the municipality's population was Roman Catholic, 13.34% were evangelicals, 4.49% had no religion, 0.89% Jehovah's Witnesses, 0.85% were spiritists, 0.74% others Christian religiosities (which include the Brazilian Catholic Apostolic Church, the Eastern Orthodox Church, Church of Jesus Christ of Latter-day Saints and others) and 0.75% of other religions.

Among the Protestant denominations in Teresina, the majority is Pentecostal, about 7.79%. Baptists constitute 2.62% of the population of the municipality, 0.86% Adventists, 0.12% are Presbyterians, 0.08% the other Protestant groups (Lutherans, Congregationals and Methodists) and 1.84% have no denomination. The Assemblies of God is the largest Pentecostal group, with 4.16% of the population, followed by the Universal Church of the Kingdom of God with 1.31% and the Christian Congregation in Brazil with 0.41%.

There are 20 congregations of the Church of Jesus Christ of Latter-day Saints in Teresina.

== Health ==
In Teresina there are 634 health institutions, eight hospitals, 181 clinics and 170 clinics, employing some 15,000 people.

== Education ==
English and Spanish are part of the official high school curriculum, in addition to the official national language, Portuguese.

=== Universities in Teresina ===
- Universidade Federal do Piauí (UFPI)
- Universidade Estadual do Piauí (Uespi)
- Instituto Federal de Educação, Ciência e Tecnologia do Piauí (IFPI)
- Centro Universitário Uninovafapi
- Centro Universitário Facid Wyden
- Centro Universitário Santo Agostinho (UNIFSA)
- Instituto Camilo Filho (ICF)
- Centro de Ensino Unificado de Teresina (CEUT)
- Faculdade das Atividades Empresariais de Teresina (FAETE)

=== Schools ===
- Colégio Diocesano
- Colégio Sagrado Coração de Jesus (1906)
- Instituto Dom Barreto (1944)
- Colégio Certo (1996)

== Economy ==
The Gross Domestic Product of Teresina represents about 40% of GDP in the state of Piauí. In industry, there is the textile and garment industry, which exports to other regions and generates about ten thousand jobs. There are also manufacturers bicycles, drink industries, pharmaceuticals, chemicals, furniture and ceramics, among others. The building deserves to be a fast-growing sector due to the verticality of the city over the past 15 years.

=== Transportation ===
Teresina has a rail service (Teresina Metro) comprising nine different stations. There is also bus service through the city. Teresina/Senador Petrônio Portella Airport, opened in 1967, lies north of the capital, between the rivers Parnaíba and Poty.

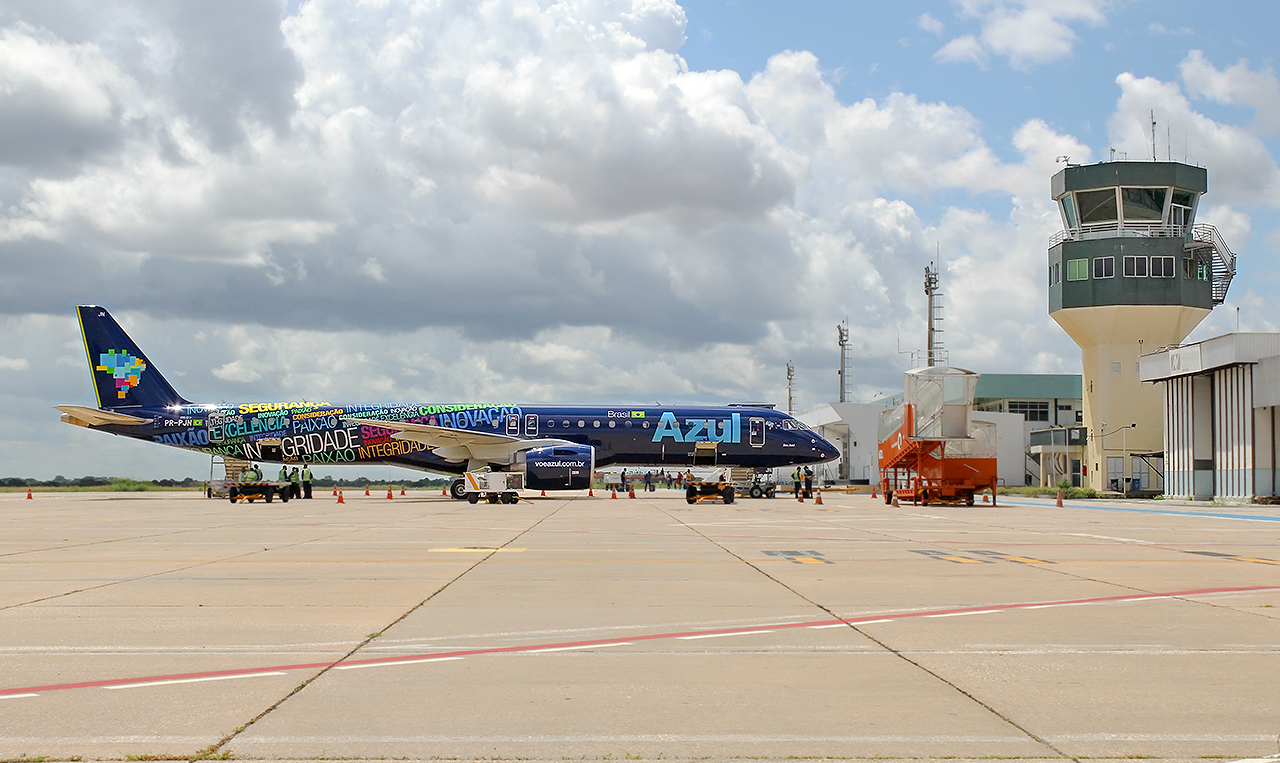
Teresina Airport.

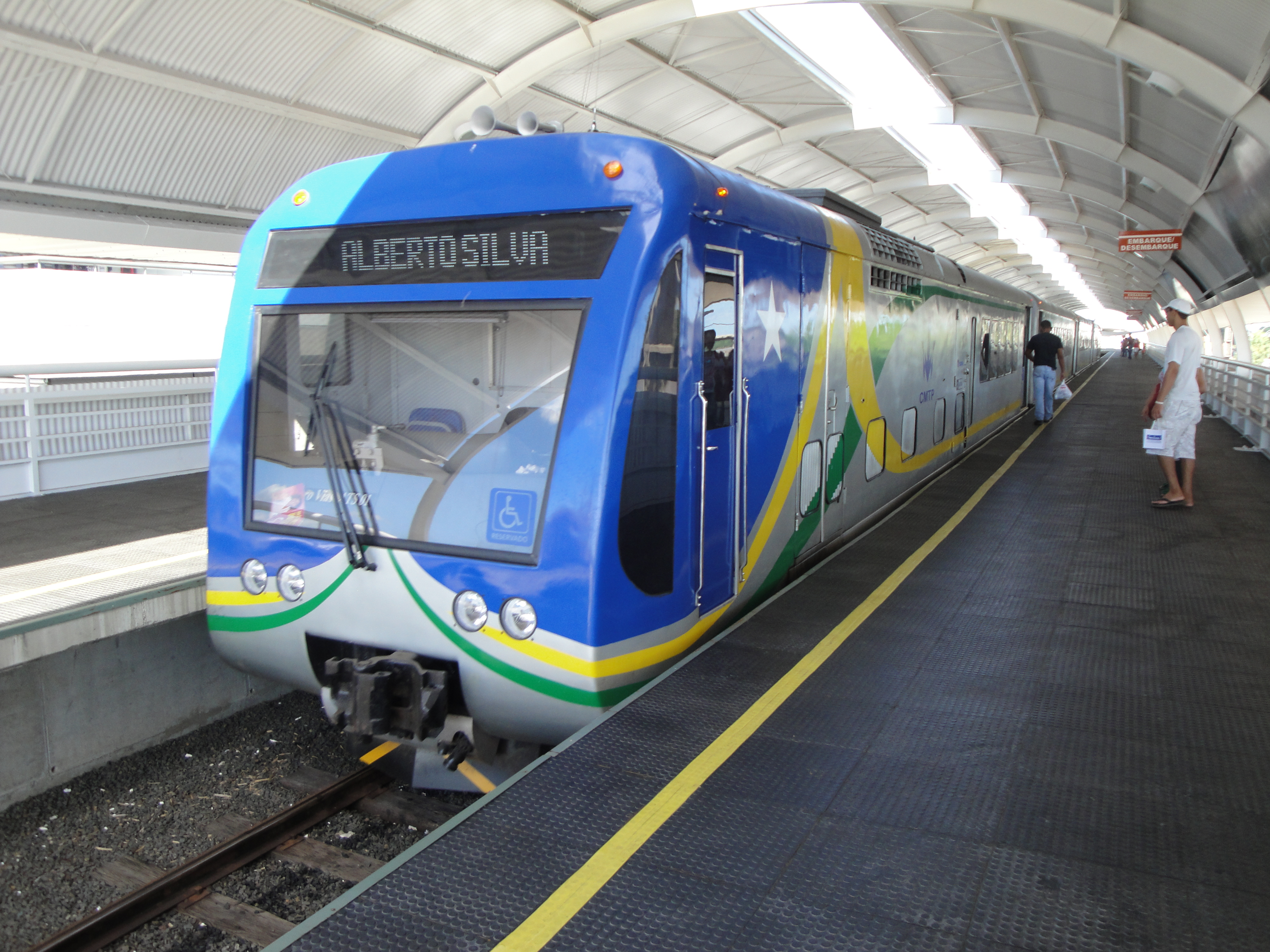
Teresina Metro.

== Sports ==
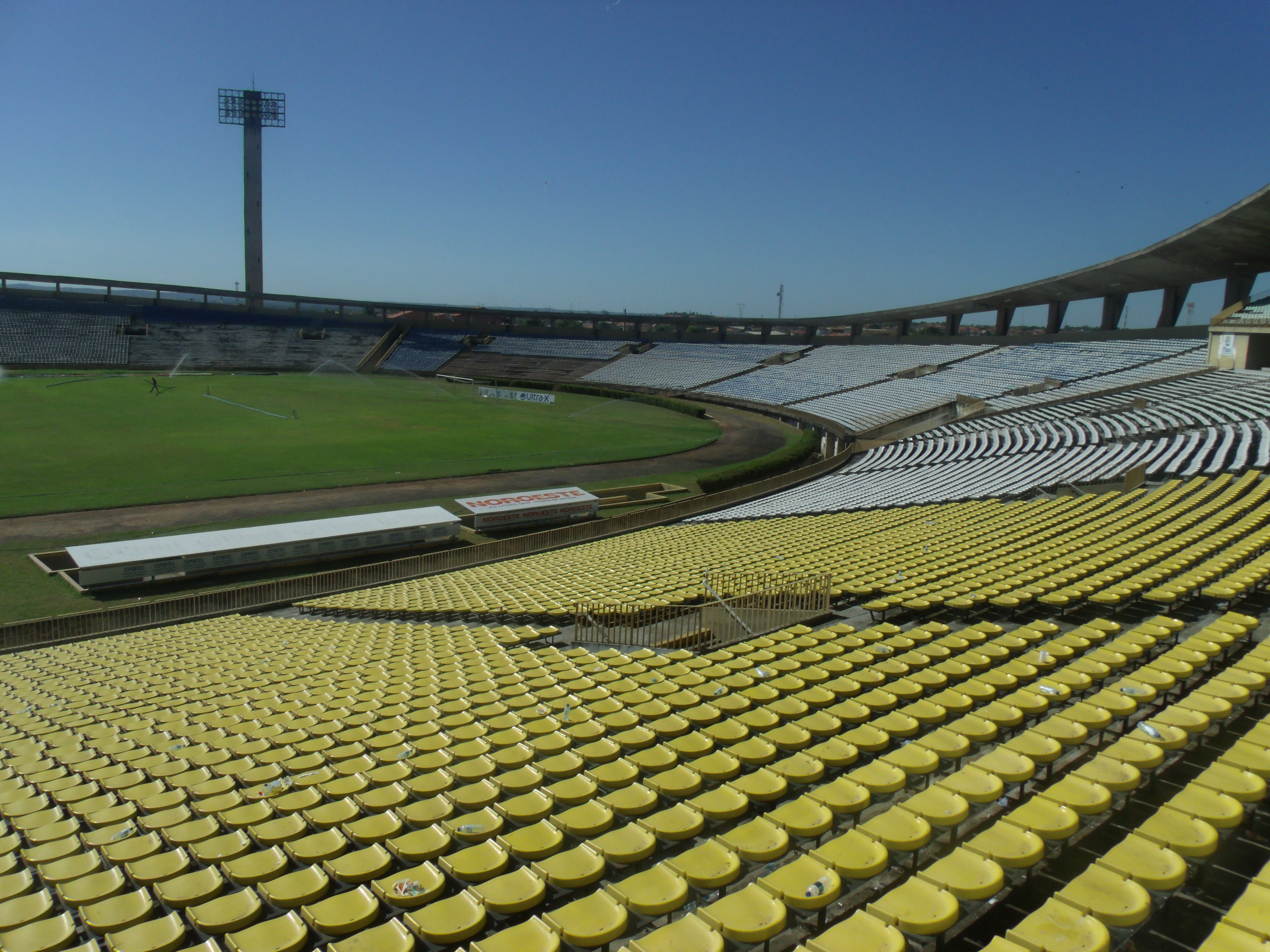
Stadium Governador Alberto Tavares Silva.

The Albertão Stadium holds 60,000 spectators, houses soccer, athletics and other games. A smaller stadium (6,000 places) is the Lindolfo Monteiro Stadium, opened in 1944. It was restored in 2008.

Football teams Teresina include Flamengo-PI, River-PI, Tiradentes and Piauí-PI. Teresina has one rugby union club that is in Brazil's women's rugby top flight, Delta Rugby Clube.
