= Centro Universitário Uninovafapi =

University in Piauí, Brazil

Coordinates: 5.0692°S 42.7473°W

- UNINOVAFAPI
- Type: Private
- Established: 2000
- Location: Teresina, Piauí, Brazil
- Website: Official website (in Portuguese)

Centro Universitário Uninovafapi (UNINOVAFAPI) is a higher education institution located in Teresina, capital of the Brazilian state of Piauí. It was inaugurated in 2000 with the ordinance of the Ministry of Education and the Ministry of Culture.

To enter as a student, high school graduation from a recognized institution of education is required. Every twice a year there is access through the vestibular, one at the middle of the year right before winter vacations and another selective process in the end of the year, before the summer vacations.

All the teachers have an MBA in the practice area as required to teach at the faculty.

== Schools and courses ==
=== Health Sciences School ===
- Physiotherapy
- Biomedicine
- Medicine
- Speech-language pathology
- Nutrition
- Nursing
- Dentistry
- Physical Education

=== Human Sciences School ===
- Law
- Administration/FGV
- Social Service

=== Technological School ===
- Fashion

== Infrastructure ==
=== Library ===
The library has full access to the students, teachers and faculty staff. A digital scanner system is in use for lending books, preventing the use of false identity.

=== Classrooms ===
The classes are equipped with a home-theater stereo sound system, datashow, and whiteboard. There are also airconditioners.

=== Computer Labs ===
Lab 1 has 25 computers programmed for academic sources and general search on the Internet. Lab 2 has 45 line up computers, source on intranet article system and general source at Internet.

=== Web/Software ===
- Net Teacher
- Net Library
- Net Student
- Net Coordinator
- Entrance Exam
- Faculty Avaliation
- Intranet Article System (based on Academic OnFile)
- Intranet Webmail
