= Centro Universitário da Região da Campanha =

University of the Campaign Region
- Universidade da Região da Campanha
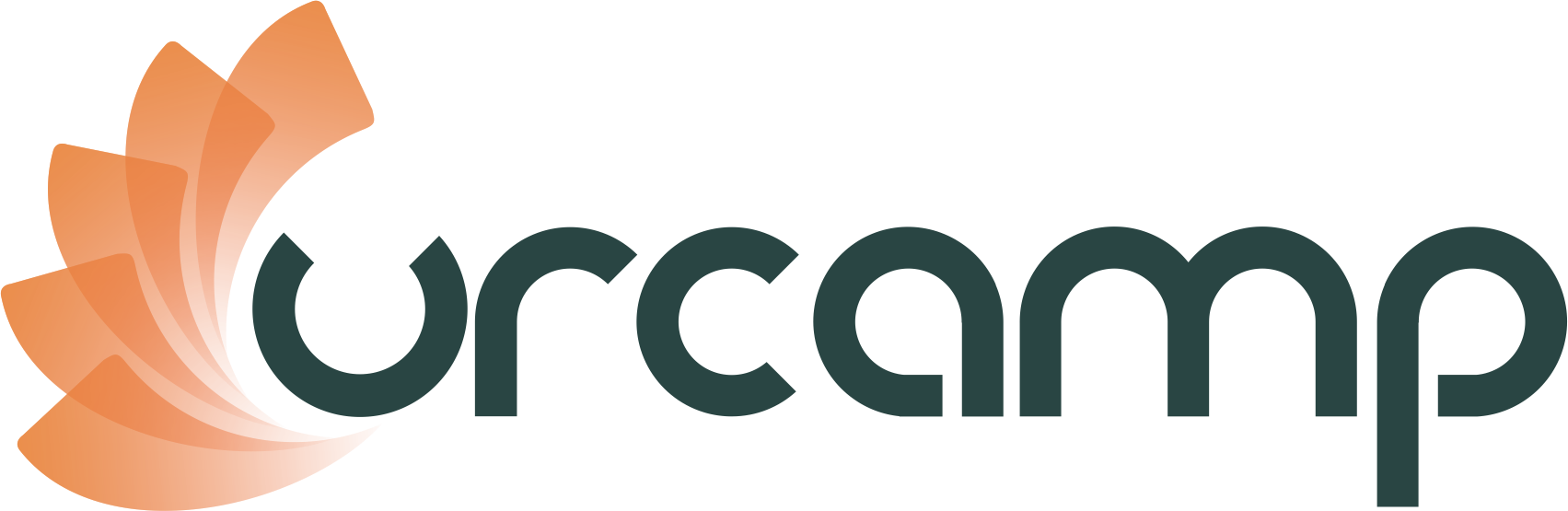
- Type: Public
- Established: February 16, 1989
- Location: Bagé, Rio Grande do Sul, Brazil; 31.31557°S 54.10757°W
- Website: http://www.urcamp.edu.br

The Centro Universitário da Região da Campanha (URCAMP) (English: University Center of the Campanha Region) formerly the Universidade da Região da Campanha (English: University of the Campanha Region), is a multi-campus, community, regional and philanthropic institution located in the southwest region of Rio Grande do Sul. Its headquarters are in Bagé and it has a presence in four other cities in the regions of Fronteira Oeste and Campanha Gaúcha.

== History ==
It was created on January 13, 1969, as the University of Bagé Foundation (FUnBa) by Attila Taborda, when the higher education courses of the institutions were unified: The Catholic Faculty of Philosophy, Sciences and Letters, the Faculty of Economic Sciences, the Faculty of Fine Arts and the Faculty of Law. In 1972, the Faculty of Physical Education was created, followed by the Faculty of Veterinary Medicine and Agronomy in 1976. With the emergence of more courses, FUnBA became the Attila Taborda Foundation and on February 16, 1989, the institution was recognized as the University of the Campanha Region. After Urcamp was founded, campuses were created in Dom Pedrito, Caçapava do Sul, São Gabriel, Santana do Livramento, São Borja, Alegrete and Itaqui.

Since 2007, Urcamp has held the seal of Socially Responsible Institution from the Brazilian Association of Higher Education Providers — ABMES.

In 2017, the rectory and members of the university council, considering the need to readjust to the academic, financial and administrative reality, and considering that the institution did not meet all the requirements to remain in the academic organization of the university type (among them, the absence of stricto sensu postgraduate courses, masters and doctorates) opted to request the institution's re-accreditation as a University Center. In August 2018, after the on-site visit related to its re-accreditation process, it received the highest score from the Ministry of Education (MEC). This re-accreditation, however, changed the institution's academic organization from University to University Centre, as requested and given that the institution did not meet all the criteria to be classified as a university. The institution's academic organization was changed from University to University Centre.

== Courses ==
Urcamp offers 20 undergraduate courses. Since 2020, the institution has also offered distance learning, and a further 22 courses are being offered at a distance on all campuses, with online and semi-presential classes. The institution also offers more than 10 lato sensu postgraduate courses in hybrid mode, including specializations in Human Rights and Public Policies, Cognitive Behavioural Therapy and the MBA in Agribusiness, Technology, Management and Succession.

Research and Extension

Once a year, the institution holds the Congrega Urcamp event, in which scientific papers from research groups are presented at the Postgraduate Conference, the Community, Extension and Integrative Projects Exhibition and the Junior Scientific Initiation Exhibition. On the Alegrete campus, the Ruy Ramos Oratory Contest is held annually in honor of the former federal deputy and public prosecutor from Rio Grande do Sul.
