= University of Cruz Alta =

Brazilian university

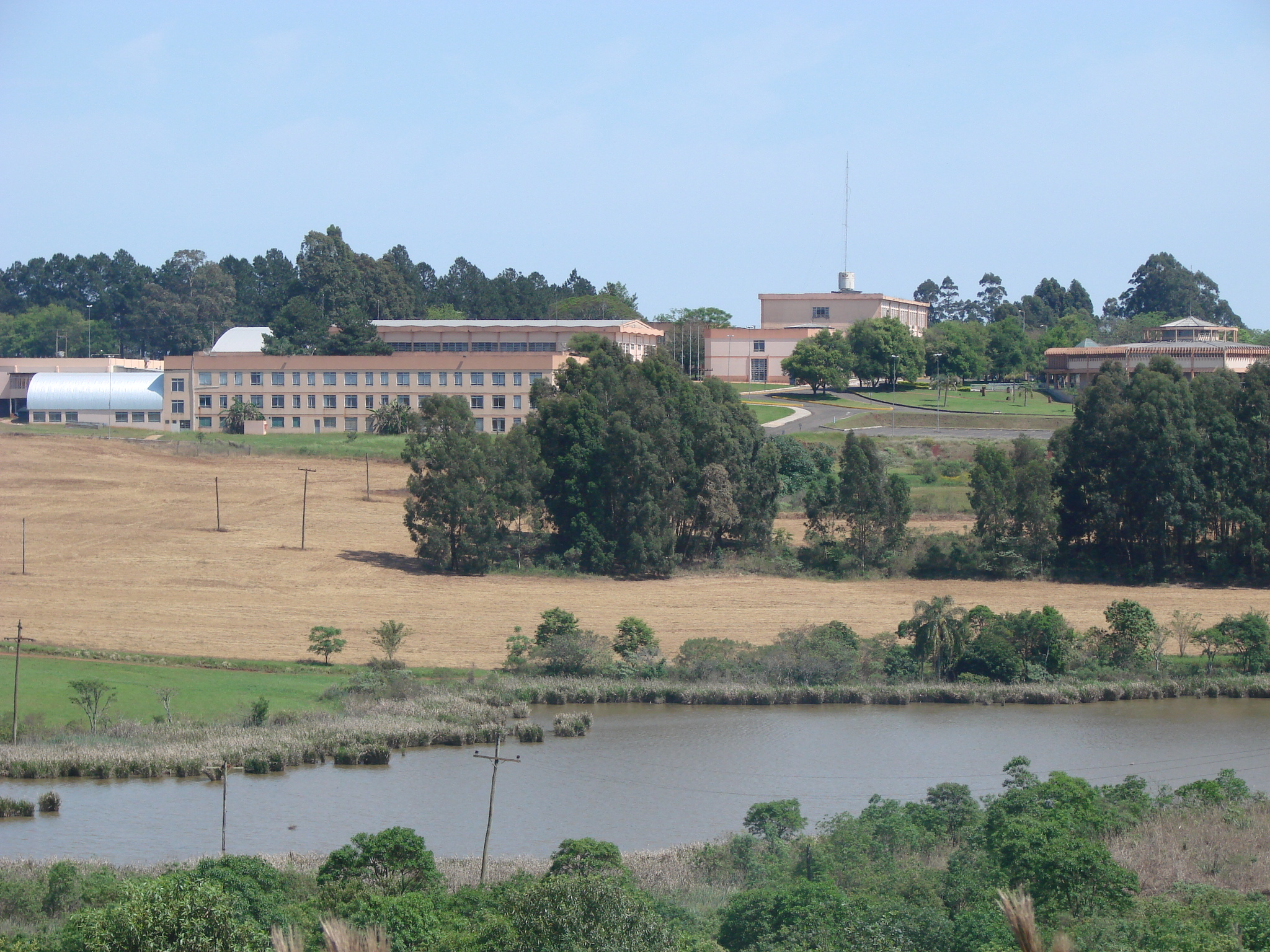
Universidade de Cruz Alta

The University of Cruz Alta (in Portuguese Universidade de Cruz Alta), also known as UNICRUZ, is a private university in Brazil, located in the city of Cruz Alta, in the state of Rio Grande do Sul. It was founded on February 21, 1988.
