= Federal University of São Paulo =

Public university in Brazil

Coordinates: 23.5915°S 46.6492°W

- Universidade Federal de São Paulo
- Other names: UNIFESP
- Type: Public university
- Established: June 1, 1933
- Budget: R$ 626.924.941,83 (2013)
- Rector: Nelson Sass
- Undergraduates: 9147
- Postgraduates: 8996
- Location: City of São Paulo, São Paulo, Brazil
- Website: unifesp.br

The Federal University of São Paulo (Portuguese: Universidade Federal de São Paulo, UNIFESP) is a public university in the state of São Paulo, Brazil.

Until 2005, UNIFESP was exclusively for Health Sciences, but after that year the university became multisubject due to Brazilian Federal Government's University Reform Program (REUNI). Now, the university has six campuses, the oldest in Vila Clementino, in São Paulo (Health) and four more in Guarulhos (Humanities area), Diadema (Science, Engineering and related), Santos (Health, Marine Sciences), São José dos Campos (Computational and Engineering fields) and Osasco (Business and related). New campus is planned in Santo Amaro, a district of (São Paulo).

Despite the recent expansion, UNIFESP is considered one of the most prestigious universities in the country, attracting students from all over Brazil and neighboring countries.

== Courses offered ==
Campus Vila Clementino (São Paulo) - founded in 1933 as Paulista School of Medicine

- Medicine since 1933
- Nursing - 1939
- Biomedicine - 1966
- Fonaudiology - 1969
- Health Technologies - Ophthalmology - 2008 (1962 as Ophthalmology)
- Health Technologies - Radiology - 2008
- Health Technologies - Health Informatics - 2010

Campus Baixada Santista - founded in 2006

- Nutrition - 2006
- Physical therapy - 2006
- Physical education - 2006
- Psychology - 2006
- Occupational therapy - 2006
- Social work - 2009
- Interdisciplinary bachelor in Marine Sciences - 2012

Campus Guarulhos - founded in 2007

- History - 2007
- Social sciences - 2007
- Philosophy - 2007
- Pedagogy - 2007
- History of Art - 2009
- Letras(Portuguese and English/French/Spanish - 2009)

Campus Diadema - founded in 2007

- Chemistry - 2007
- Chemical Engineering - 2007
- Pharmacy - 2007
- Biology - 2007
- Industrial Chemistry - 2009
- Sciences - Licenciature (Licentiate Degree): Physics, Mathematics, Biology and Chemistry - 2010
- Environmental Sciences - 2010

Campus São José dos Campos - founded in 2007

- Computer Science - 2007
- Computational Mathematics - 2009
- Bachelor of Science and Technology - 2011
- Materials Engineering - 2011
- Biomedical Engineering - 2011
- Biotechnology Engineering - 2015
- Computer Engineering - 2015

Campus Osasco - founded in 2011

- Actuarial Science
- Business Administration
- Accounting
- Economics
- International relations

== See also ==
- Brazil university rankings
- List of federal universities of Brazil
- Universities and higher education in Brazil
