= Federal University of Pampa =

Federal public university in Bage, Rio Grande do Sul

Coordinates: 31.325297°S 54.093075°W

- Universidade Federal do Pampa
- Other name: UNIPAMPA
- Type: Public
- Established: 2006
- Rector: Ulrika Arns
- Location: Bagé, Rio Grande do Sul, Brazil
- Campus: 10 campuses in cities across the Pampa Region of Rio Grande do Sul
- Website: www.unipampa.edu.br

The Federal University of Pampa (Portuguese: Universidade Federal do Pampa, Unipampa) is a public university established in 2006 in the Southern region of the state of Rio Grande do Sul.

Unipampa was created by Law 11640 of January 11, 2008 as the Federal University of Pampa, with headquarters in the city of Bagé, in Rio Grande do Sul.

Unipampa has campuses in Alegrete, Bagé, Caçapava do Sul, Dom Pedrito, Itaqui, Jaguarão, Santana do Livramento, São Borja, São Gabriel and Uruguaiana.

The first exams for the Vestibular Unipampa occurred on December 17 and June 18, 2006. The first class was in September 2006. Entering Unipampa from 2010 was through ENEM SISU.

The first academic master's Unipampa was the Graduate Program in Electrical Engineering in the Alegrete campus recommended by CAPES in 2009 and activities started in August 2010.

== Paleontology ==
São Gabriel campus performs paleontological research, in the Geopark of Paleorrota. The research has been made between the São Gabriel city to the Bagé city and belong to the Permian period.

== Undergraduate courses ==
Alegrete Campus

- Computer Science
- Civil Engineering
- Electrical Engineering
- Mechanical Engineering
- Software Engineering
- Agricultural Engineering
- Master in Electrical Engineering

Bagé Campus

- Production Engineering
- Food Engineering
- Chemical Engineering
- Computer Engineering
- Energy Engineering
- Degree in Physics
- BSc Chemistry
- Degree in Mathematics
- Bachelor of Arts - Portuguese and Spanish
- Bachelor of Arts - English and Portuguese

Caçapava do Sul Campus

- Center for Science and Technology
  - Bachelor of Geophysics
  - BS in Geology
  - Degree in Mathematical Sciences - Physics, Chemistry and Mathematics
  - Degree in Mining Technology

Dom Pedrito Campus

- Center for Agricultural Sciences:
  - Animal Science
  - Degree in Technology in Agribusiness

Itaqui Campus

- Center for Agricultural Sciences:
  - Agronomy
  - Science and Technology Agrifood
  - Nutrition

Jaguarão Campus

- Center for the Humanities:
  - Education
  - Bachelor of Arts - Portuguese and Spanish
  - Degree in History
  - Technology in Tourism

Santana do Livramento Campus

- Center for the Humanities:
  - Business Administration
  - Degree in Technology Management in Public
  - International Relations
  - Economics

São Borja Campus

- Center for Social Sciences:
  - Media: Journalism
  - Media: Advertising
  - Media: Public Relations
  - Social Welfare
  - Political Science

São Gabriel Campus

- Center of Rural Sciences:
  - Biological Sciences - Bachelor
  - Biological Sciences - full degree
  - Forestry - Environmental Management
  - Biotechnology

Uruguaiana Campus

- Center for Health Sciences:
  - Natural Sciences
  - Nursing
  - Pharmacy
  - Physiotherapy
  - Veterinary Medicine
  - Degree and Bachelor of Physical Education
  - Degree in Technology in Aquaculture

== Graduate courses ==
- Master's Degree in Electrical Engineering
- Expertise in Technology in Mathematics Teaching
- Specialization in Literature and Language
- Specialization in Policies and Intervention in Intra-Family Violence
- Master's Degree Biochemistry

== See also ==
- Brazil University Rankings
- List of federal universities of Brazil
- Pampa Region
- Universities and Higher Education in Brazil
