= State University of Ponta Grossa =

Public university in Paraná, Brazil

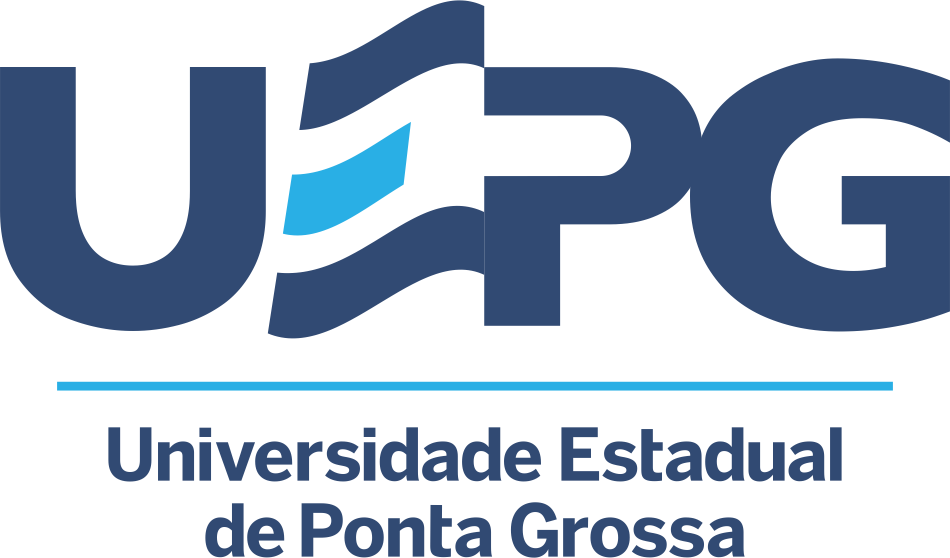
- Other name: UEPG
- Type: Public University
- Established: 1969
- Rector: Miguel Sanches Neto
- Faculty: 938 (Headcount)
- Students: 15,492
- Undergraduates: 12,236
- Postgraduates: 3,256
- Location: Ponta Grossa, Parana, Brazil
- Campus: Urban
- Website: www.uepg.br

The State University of Ponta Grossa (Portuguese: Universidade Estadual de Ponta Grossa, UEPG) is a public higher education institution in the state of Paraná, Brazil. The university has two campuses in the city of Ponta Grossa and one campus in the city of Telêmaco Borba. UEPG influences approximately 22 municipalities of Paraná.

The institution offers 36 undergraduate degree programs, in addition to graduate degree programs. The university also offers distance education.

== History ==
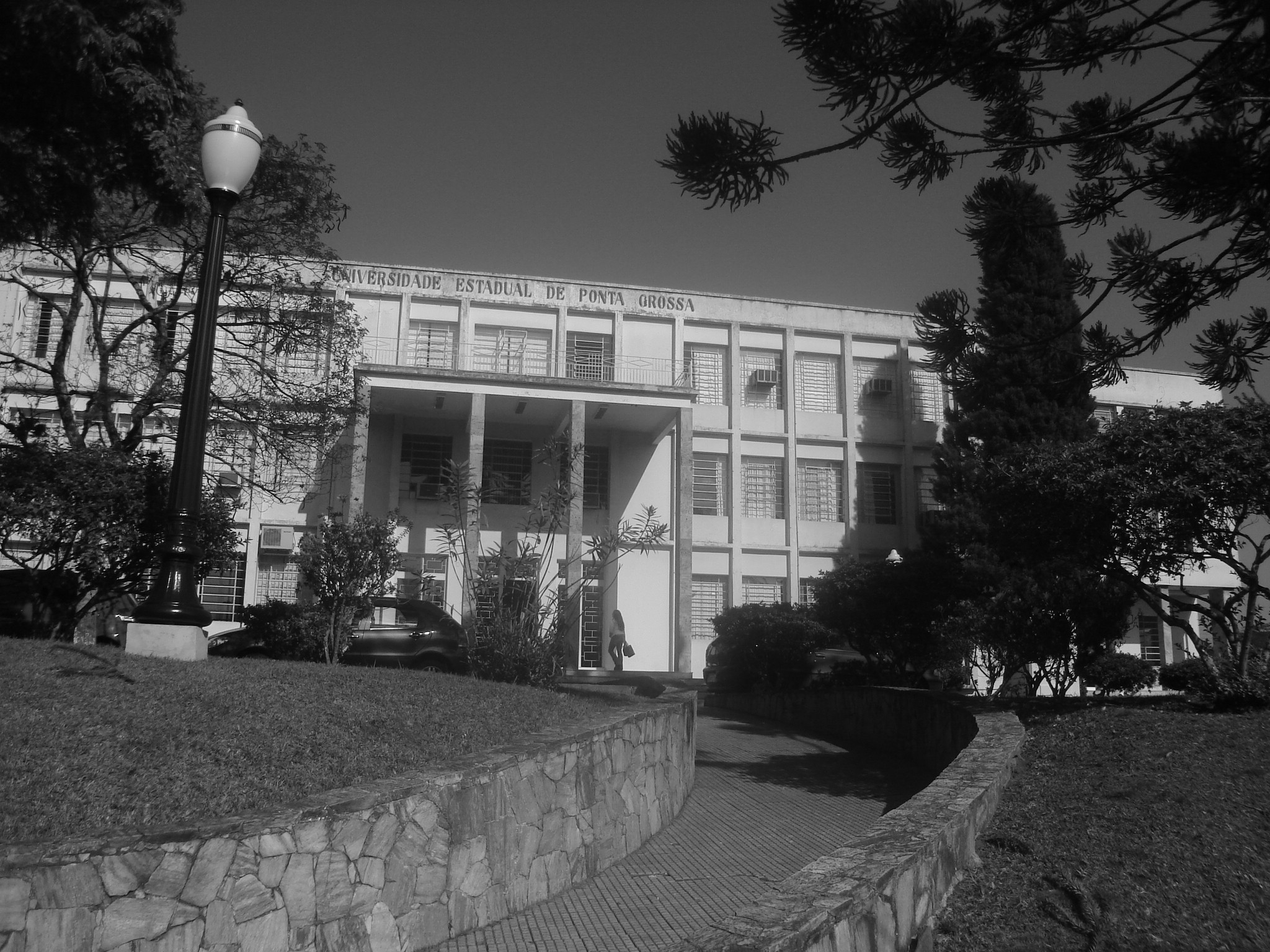
View of the Central campus of the State University of Ponta Grossa

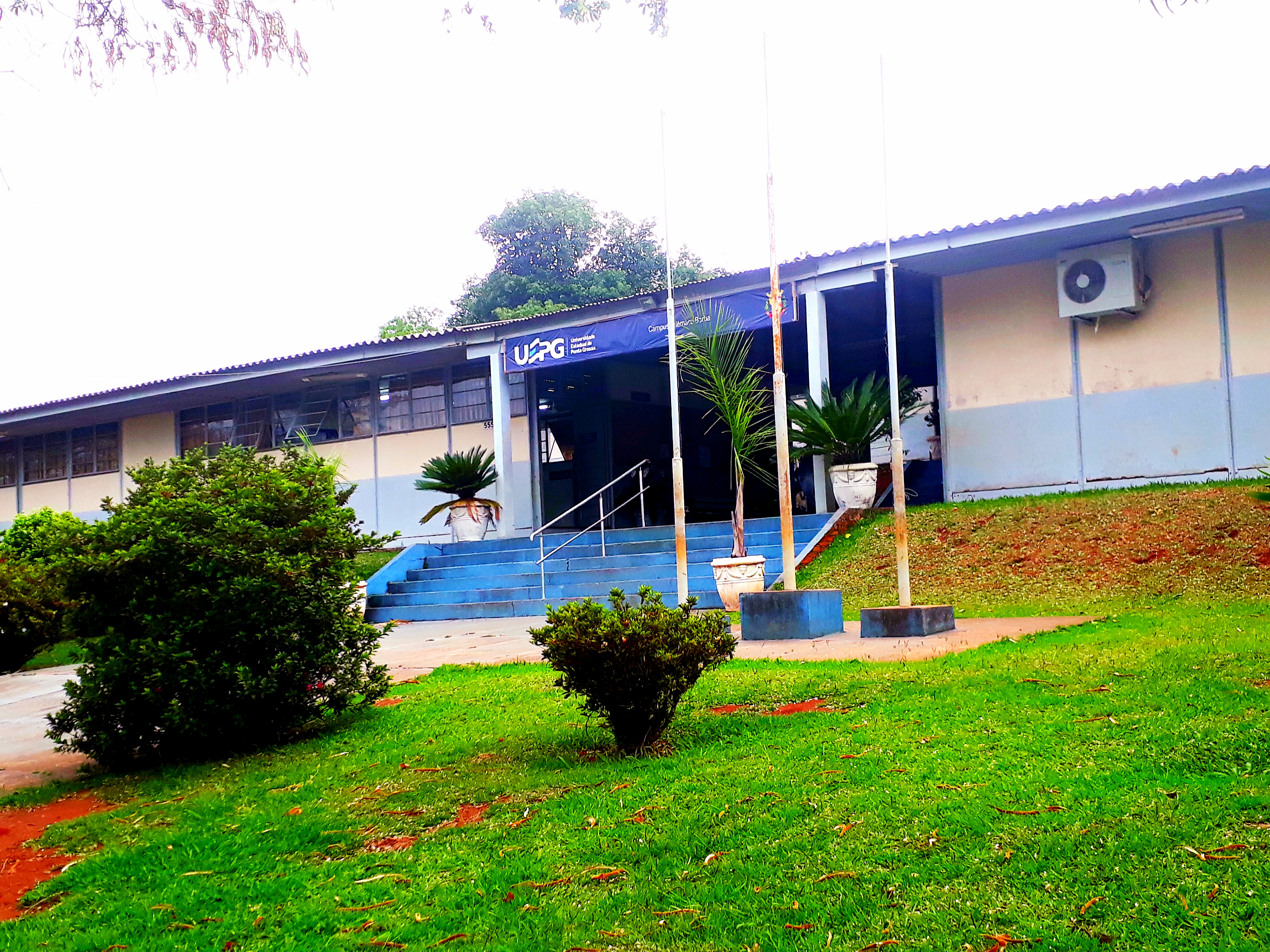
View of the Telemaco Borba campus of UEPG

UEPG was created by the State Government through the Law 6.034, November 6, 1969, and Decree no 18.111, January 28, 1970, which resulted in the incorporation of the already existing faculties that were working independently, such as the State College of Philosophy, Sciences and Letters of Ponta Grossa, the State College of Pharmacy and Dentistry of Ponta Grossa, the State College of Law of Ponta Grossa and the State College of Economic Sciences and Administration of Ponta Grossa.

== Campus ==
UEPG currently has three campuses, two located in the city of Ponta Grossa and one located in the city of Telêmaco Borba, both in the state of Paraná. The university's main campus is located in downtown Ponta Grossa, and the administrative building is located in the Uvaranas area.

The Uvaranas campus has, among other facilities, a running track, a soccer field, multisport courts, a heated pool, an astronomical observatory and a library, the Central Library Professor Faris Michaele, with over 90.000 copies.

== Academics ==
=== Divisions ===
Agrarian and Technological Sciences

- Civil Engineering
- Agronomy
- Software Engineering
- Materials Engineering
- Food Engineering
- Computer Engineering
- Zootechnics

Life Sciences

- Biology
- Physical Education
- Nursing
- Pharmacy
- Medicine
- Dentistry

Humanities and Arts

- Visual Arts
- History
- Education
- Languages and Literature (Portuguese/English, Portuguese/Spanish and Portuguese/French)
- Music

Exact Sciences

- Mathematics
- Physics
- Geography
- Chemistry
- Chemical Technology

Social Sciences

- Administration
- Economics
- International Trade
- Social Service
- Accounting
- Journalism
- Tourism

Law

=== Healthcare ===
UEPG administers the Regional University Hospital of Campos Gerais, which attends patients from 12 cities of Parana. The hospital has 168 beds: 6 in the Neonatal Intensive Care Unit (ICU); 4 in the Pediatric ICU; 20 in the Adult ICU; 2 in the Neonatal ICU; 32 in Internal Medicine; 63 in Surgery and 41 in Nursery.

=== Rankings ===
University rankings

Global – Overall
- THE World: 801-1000 (2017)

In 2017, Times Higher Education ranked the university within the 801-1000 band globally.

== Admissions ==
The admission process for prospective students happens through an entrance exam called vestibular or through the Serial Selective Process (Portuguese: Processo Seletivo Seriado, PSS), a three-stage process composed of tests similar to the vestibular. Each stage happens in one of the three years that constitute the Brazilian High School system.

The vestibular can be taken by anyone that wishes to study at the university, but the PSS can only be taken by high school students.

== Economic impact ==
According to studies, every real invested in the higher education institutions is multiplied by four when returned to local economies. Thus, UEPG has an annual impact of 500 million reais (about U$120 mi) on the regional economy.

== See also ==
- List of state universities in Brazil
