= Rio Grande do Sul State University =

Brazilian public university

- Universidade Estadual do Rio Grande do Sul
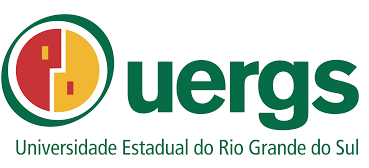
- Other names: UERGS
- Type: Public University
- Established: 2001
- Rector: Arisa Araujo Luz
- Academic staff: 262
- Students: 3,926
- Location: Porto Alegre (main campus), Rio Grande do Sul, Brazil
- Website: www.uergs.edu.br

The Rio Grande do Sul State University (Portuguese: Universidade Estadual do Rio Grande do Sul, UERGS) is a Brazilian public university. It was founded in 2001 in the city of Porto Alegre and its campuses are distributed across several cities in the Rio Grande do Sul state.

== See also ==
- List of state universities in Brazil
