= Federal University of Science and Innovation of Minas Gerais =

Educational institution in Brazil

Coordinates: 10°39′S 52°57′W

- Universidade Federal de Ciência e Inovação de Minas Gerais
- Former names: Escola de Aprendizes Artífices de Minas Gerais; Escola Técnica Federal de Minas Gerais; Centro Federal de Educação Tecnológica de Minas Gerais
- Motto: 116 anos: Semeando o futuro
- Motto in English: 116 years: Sowing the future
- Type: Public university system, Federal
- Established: 1909
- Affiliations: Ministry of Education
- Chancellor: Carla Simone Chamon
- Vice-Chancellor: Conrado de Souza Rodrigues
- Location: Belo Horizonte, Minas Gerais, Brazil
- Campus: Belo Horizonte, Leopoldina, Araxá, Divinópolis, Varginha, Timóteo, Nepomuceno, Curvelo and Contagem.
- Colors: Blue
- Website: www.cefetmg.br

The Federal University of Science and Innovation of Minas Gerais (Portuguese: Universidade Federal de Ciência e Inovação de Minas Gerais, UFCIMG) previously Federal Center for Technological Education of Minas Gerais (Portuguese: Centro Federal de Educação Tecnológica de Minas Gerais, CEFET-MG) is an education center located in the Brazilian state of Minas Gerais.

It is a technological institution that offers a broad range of courses in the State of Minas Gerais, in the southeast of Brazil. With approximately 15,000 students, 650 professors and 400 staff members, the institution carries out teaching associated with research and communitarian extension in the secondary and higher education levels.

Campuses I, II and VI are located in Amazonas Avenue in Belo Horizonte. The other campuses (Decentralized Education Units - UNEDs) located within the state of Minas Gerais, the cities of Leopoldina, Araxá, Divinópolis, Varginha, Timóteo, Nepomuceno, Curvelo and Contagem.

On September 24, 2026, President Lula signed the law transforming the Federal Center for Technological Education of Minas Gerais (Cefet-MG) into the Federal University of Science and Innovation of Minas Gerais (UFCI/MG).

== Courses ==
=== Secondary level ===
UFCIMG offers secondary (high-school) level education at all campuses. High-school students at UFCIMG also graduate with a degree from one of the many professional and technological courses offered by the institution. Students are admitted through admission exams held at the end of each calendar year.

=== Professional and Technological education ===
UFCIMG offers professional and technological courses in three ways:

- Integrated: for students who have not yet graduated from high-school and wish to do so at UFCIMG;
- External: for students currently enrolled at other secondary schools;
- Subsequent: for people who already have a high-school degree.

Students are admitted through admission exams held on a semestrial basis, except for the integrated courses.

The courses (some offered only in certain campuses) are:

- Biomedical Equipment
- Chemistry
- Computer Networks
- Computing
- Construction
- Electromechanics
- Electronics
- Electrotechnology
- Environmental Control
- Environmental Studies
- Fashion Design
- Highways
- Hospitality
- Mechanics
- Mechatronics
- Metallurgy
- Mining
- Transit

=== Undergraduate courses ===
UFCIMG's undergraduate courses are offered in most campuses, most notably Campus I and Campus II. Students are admitted through ENEM, a nationwide high-school-level examination which takes place towards the end of each calendar year. Admitted students are then sorted into two groups according to their ENEM score, one starting late February/early March of the following year (1st semester students) and the other in August (2nd semester students).

UFCIMG offers the following undergraduate courses:

==== Bachelor's degrees ====
- Business
- Portuguese
- Civil Engineering
- Civil Production Engineering
- Computer Engineering
- Control and Automation Engineering
- Electrical Engineering
- Environmental and Sanitary Engineering
- Industrial Automation Engineering
- Materials Engineering
- Mechanical Engineering
- Mechatronic Engineering
- Mining Engineering
- Transportation Engineering
- Technological Chemistry (Industrial Chemistry & Chemical Engineering)

==== Technological degrees ====
- Pedagogy

=== Graduate courses ===
UFCIMG offers master's and doctoral degrees as well.

==== Master's degrees ====
- Business
- Chemistry
- Civil Engineering
- Electrical Engineering
- Mining Engineering
- Energy Engineering
- Language Studies
- Materials Engineering
- Technological Education
- Mathematical and Computational Modeling

==== Doctoral degrees ====
- Language Studies
- Mathematical and Computational Modeling
- Civil Engineering

== Research ==
UFCIMG supports around 40 research groups, most of them receiving governmental grants to carry on their research. To fulfill this, UFCIMG has celebrated cooperation agreements with a number of high level Brazilian higher education institutions and universities in France, Germany, Hungary, Portugal, among others – Australia, Italy and Spain are in prospection at the moment.

== See also ==
- CEFET
