= Santa Catarina State University =

Public university in Brazil

Coordinates: 27.6011°S 48.5200°W

- Universidade do Estado de Santa Catarina
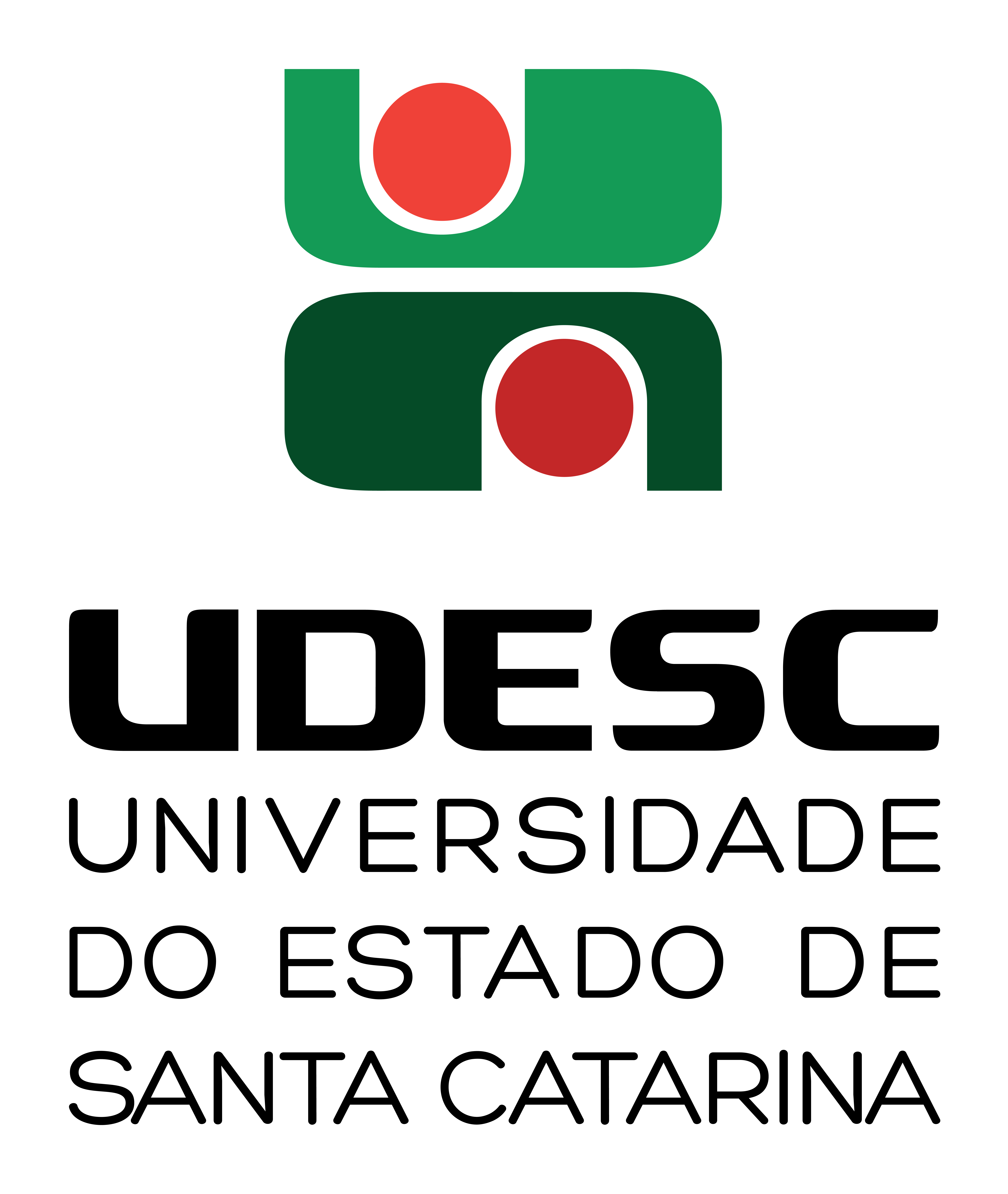
- Other names: UDESC
- Type: Public
- Established: 1965
- Location: Florianópolis, Santa Catarina, Brazil
- Website: www.udesc.br

Santa Catarina State University (Portuguese: Universidade do Estado de Santa Catarina, UDESC) is a public state university in Brazil. It was established in 1965.

UDESC is located in Santa Catarina state in southern Brazil, primarily in Itacorubi, Florianópolis and Joinville, but it has multiple campuses in 10 cities. According to its official website, it has over 13,000 students. It is regarded as one of the best state Universities in Brazil.

== Areas of concentration ==
UDESC boasts a wide variety of academic areas of concentration, both scientific and artistic.

Its Arts division (Centro de Artes) is known by the abbreviation CEART. Subdivisions of study there are primarily in: performing arts, visual arts, design, fashion, and music.

== See also ==
- List of state universities in Brazil
