= Federal Rural University of the Semi-arid Region =

Brazilian federal university in Mossoró, Rio Grande do Norte

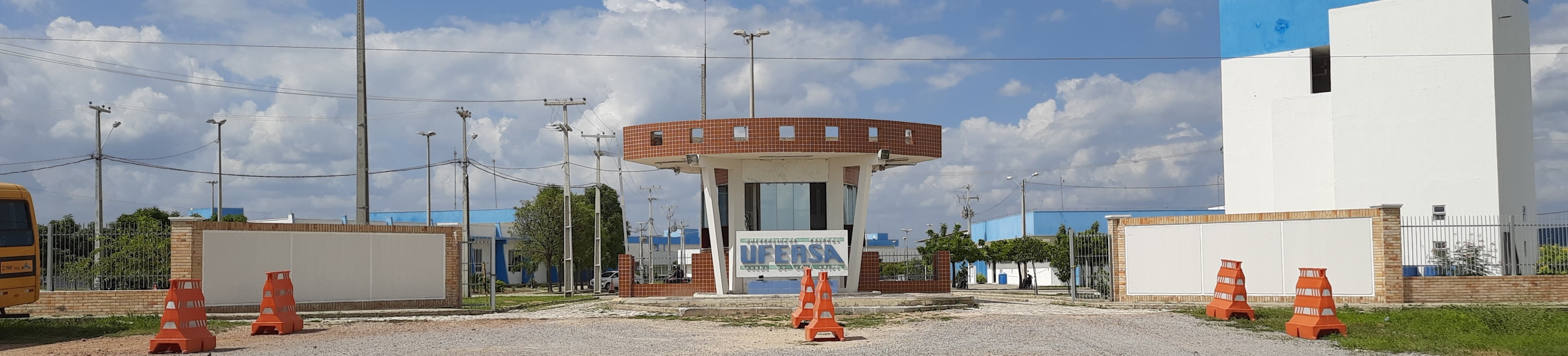

The Federal Rural University of the Semi-arid Region (Portuguese: Universidade Federal Rural do Semi-Árido, UFERSA) is a Brazilian federal university located in Mossoró, in the state of Rio Grande do Norte. It was created on August 1, 2005, by Law No 11.155, which transformed the Superior School of Agronomy of Mossoró (ESAM) into a federal university. ESAM was a municipal Higher Education Institution created on April 18, 1967, by Decree No 03/67 and incorporated to the federal educational system as a Governmental agency under special regime by Decree No 1036, on October 21, 1969. Nowadays, UFERSA has reached a 4 general index course (IGC), according to the Brazilian Ministry of Education.

Throughout Higher Education specific activities, UFERSA seeks to contribute to regional development by creating alternatives and solutions for local problems, especially those affecting people and Caatinga ecosystem.

== Campuses and courses ==
UFERSA occupies four campuses in four cities. The main campus is located in Mossoró. There are also campuses in the cities of Caraúbas, Pau dos Ferros and Angicos. In the four campuses, it offers undergraduate and graduate programs, covering more than eight knowledge areas.

== International agreements ==
As a reflection of its internationalization policy, UFERSA has international cooperation agreements with the following institutions:

- University of Miyazaki, Japão (2018–2023)
- Instituto Superior de Agronomia de Lisboa, Portugal (2013–2019)
- Università degli Studi di Torino, Itália (2015–2020)
- Universitat de València, Espanha (2015–2020)
- Universidad Nacional de Santiago del Estero, Argentina (2016–2021)
- ECAM-EPMI, França (2017–2022)
- Universidad de Buenos Aires, Argentina (2017–2022)
- Universidad Católica de Córdoba, Argentina (2018–2023)

== See also ==
- Universities and higher education in Brazil
- List of federal universities of Brazil
- List of universities in Brazil by state
- Caatinga
