= Western Paraná State University =

Public university in Paraná, Brazil

- Universidade Estadual do Oeste do Paraná
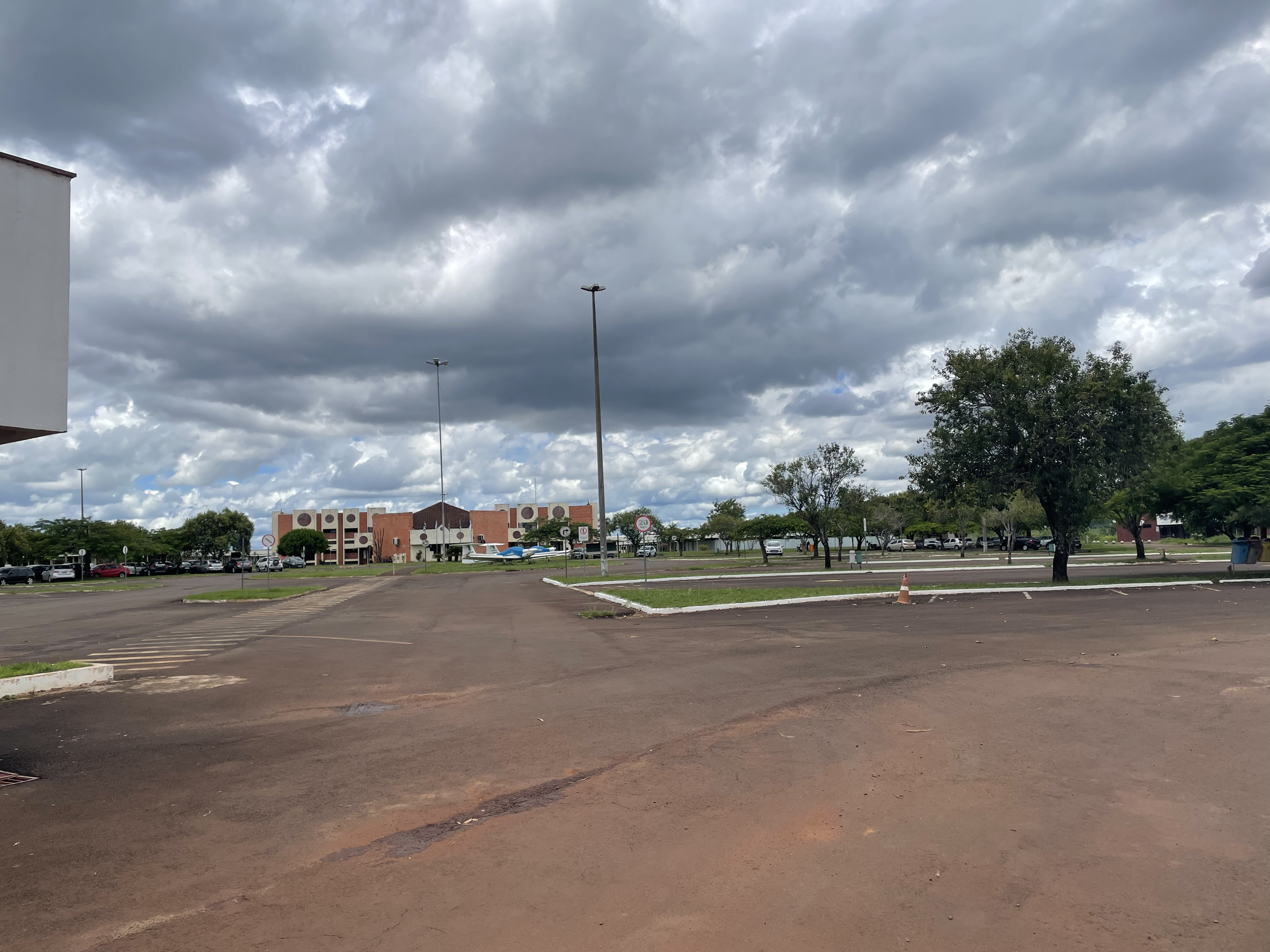
- Western Paraná State University, Foz do Iguaçu
- Other name: Unioeste
- Type: Public
- Established: January 27, 1988
- Rector: Alexandre Almeida Webber
- Undergraduates: 12.695
- Location: Cascavel, Paraná, Brazil; 24.988°S 53.451°W
- Campus: Urban
- Website: www.unioeste.br
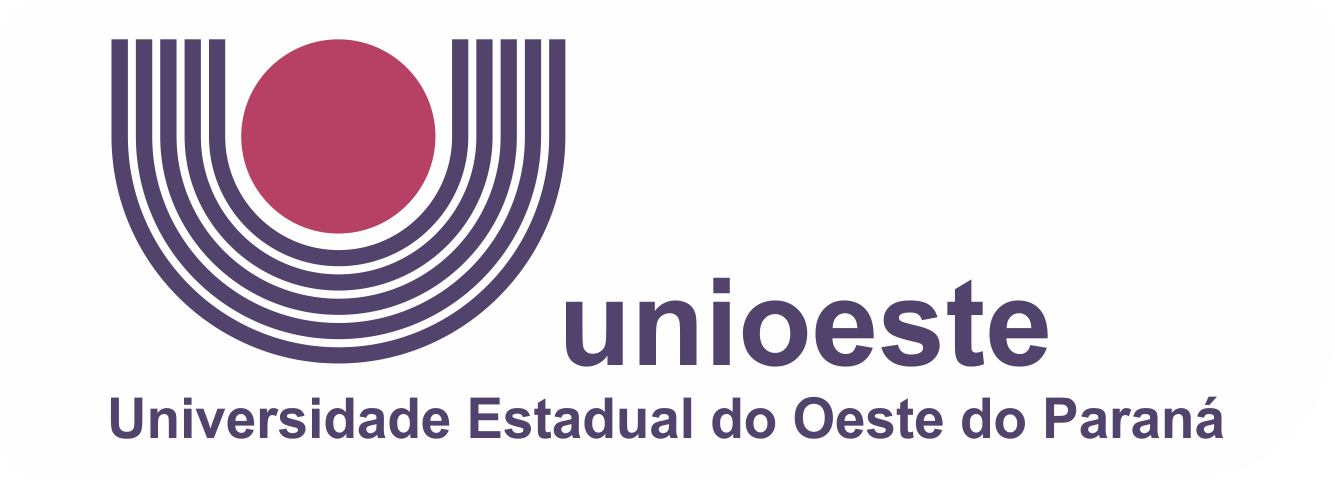

The Western Paraná State University (Portuguese: Universidade Estadual do Oeste do Paraná, Unioeste) is a public university of the State of Paraná, Brazil.

Created in 1988 and recognized in 1994 by the Federal Government of Brazil, Unioeste has 55 undergraduate degree courses and about 24 graduate programs. Based in the city of Cascavel, it has also campuses in the following cities: Foz do Iguaçu, Francisco Beltrão, Marechal Cândido Rondon and Toledo, all cities located in Paraná State, Brazil.

== See also ==
- List of state universities in Brazil
