= Federal University of Alfenas =

Public university in Minas Gerais, Brazil

- Universidade Federal de Alfenas
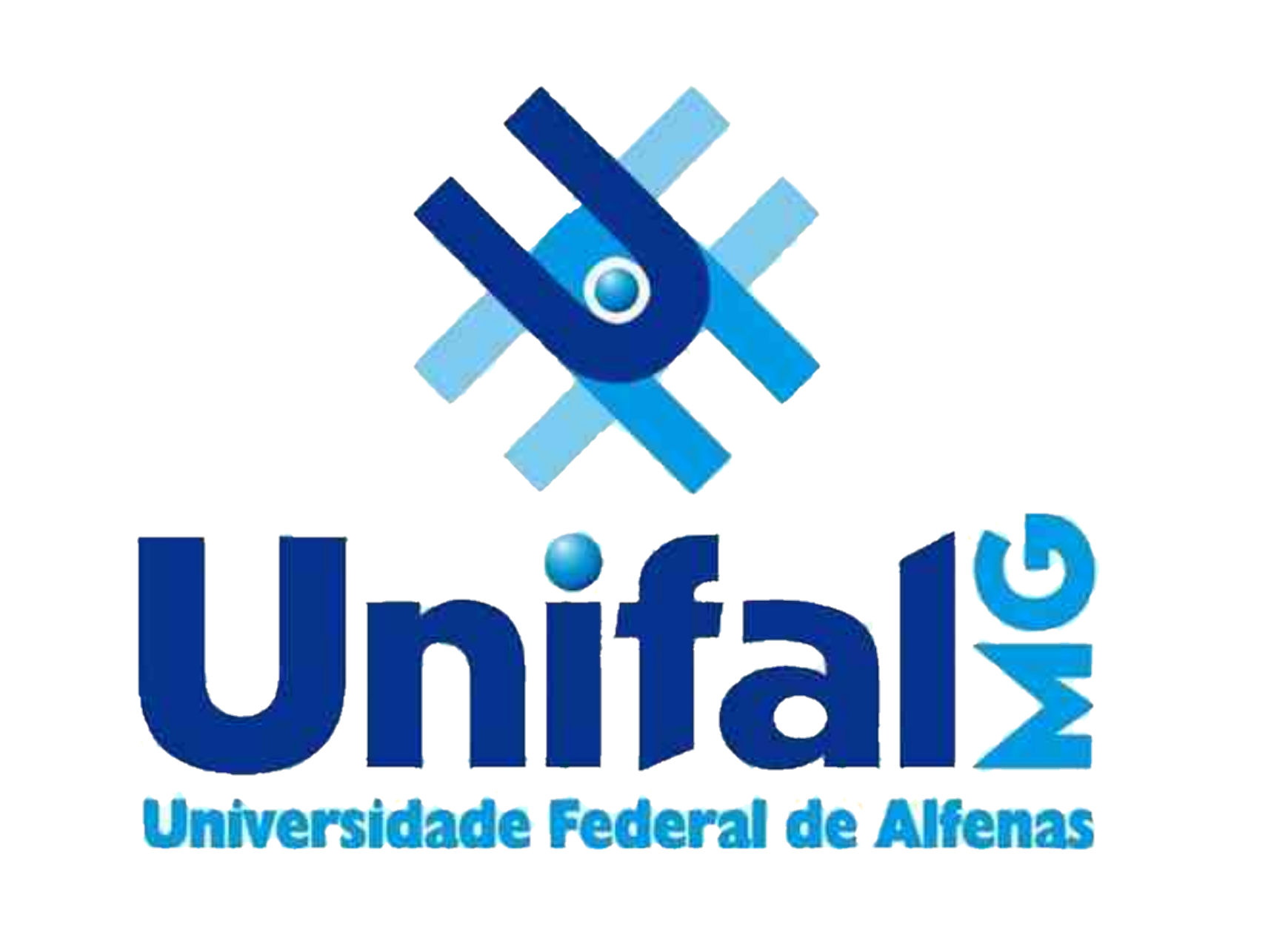
- Type: Public
- Established: April 3, 1914
- Affiliations: RENEX
- Endowment: R$117,674,676
- Rector: Paulo Márcio de Faria e Silva
- Academic staff: 361 (2012)
- Students: 5647 (2012)
- Undergraduates: 5370 (2012)
- Postgraduates: 277 (2012)
- Location: Alfenas, Poços de Caldas and Varginha
- Campus: Main Campus, Santa Clara Campus, Poços de Caldas Campus and Varginha Campus
- Colors: Blue and White
- Website: www.unifal-mg.edu.br

The Federal University of Alfenas (Brazilian Portuguese: Universidade Federal de Alfenas, Unifal-MG) is a public institution of undergraduate and postgraduate education situated in Alfenas and having campuses in the cities of Poços de Caldas and Varginha, all in the southern region of the Brazilian state of Minas Gerais.

== History ==
Originally known as School of Pharmacy and Dentistry of Alfenas (Escola de Farmácia e Odontologia de Alfenas - EFOA), it was founded on April 3, 1914, and transformed into federal university in 2005. The institution has been responsible for the education of numerous generations of notable professionals through its undergraduate and post-graduate courses; for the consolidation of services offered to the local and regional communities; and for the significant growth of its scientific and technological publications, tied to the regional and national development.

== Campuses ==
The Federal University of Alfenas is a multi-campus institution, having 4 campuses:

- Main Campus - Alfenas
- Santa Clara Campus - Alfenas
- Poços de Caldas Campus
- Varginha Campus

== Undergraduate courses ==
Main Campus - Alfenas

- Biology
- Biomedicine
- Biotechnology
- Chemistry
- Dentistry
- History
- Language and Literature (Portuguese/Spanish)
- Mathematics
- Medicine
- Nursing
- Nutrition
- Pedagogy
- Pharmacy
- Physics
- Social Sciences

Santa Clara Campus - Alfenas

- Computer Science
- Geography
- Physical Therapy

Poços de Caldas Campus

- Science and Technology
- Chemical Engineering
- Environmental Engineering
- Mine Engineering

Varginha Campus

- Science and Economics
- Economics
- Public Management
- Actuarial Science

== Post-graduate courses ==
- Biosciences Applied to Health
- Environmental Science and Engineering
- Material Science and Engineering
- Pharmaceutical Sciences
- Dental Sciences
- Environmental Sciences
- Nursing
- Applied Statistics and Biometrics
- Physics
- Public Management and Society
- Physiological Sciences
- Chemistry
- Iberian History
- and others.

== See also ==
- Alfenas
- List of federal universities of Brazil
