= State University of Santa Cruz =

University in Brazil

- Universidade Estadual de Santa Cruz
- Other name: UESC
- Motto: In Altum (Latin)
- Type: Public University
- Established: 1991
- Rector: Adélia Maria Carvalho de Melo Pinheiro
- Location: Ilhéus, Bahia, Brazil
- Website: www.uesc.br

The State University of Santa Cruz (Portuguese: Universidade Estadual de Santa Cruz, UESC) is a public institution of higher education in Brazil, based in the city of Ilhéus, Bahia. Until the 1990s, it was the only university in the city. As of 2020, the university offers 33 undergraduate courses and several graduate programs.

== Courses ==
=== Humanities ===
- Administration
- Accounting
- Communications
- Economics
- Law
- Education
- Geography
- History
- Sociology
- Philosophy
- Psychology

=== Technology and Science ===
- Computer Science
- Civil Engineering
- Mechanical Engineering
- Chemical Engineering
- Electrical Engineering
- Production Engineering
- Mathematics
- Chemistry
- Physics

=== Natural Sciences and Health ===
- Agronomy
- Biomedical Sciences
- Pharmaceutical Sciences
- Nursing
- Biological Sciences
- Physical Education
- Medicine
- Veterinary Medicine

=== Letters and Arts ===
- English Literature
- Letters Vernacular
- Foreign Languages Applied to International Negotiations

== See also ==
- List of state universities in Brazil
