= Berta Ribeiro =

Moldovan-Brazilian anthropologist (1924–1997)

- Berta Gleizer Ribeiro
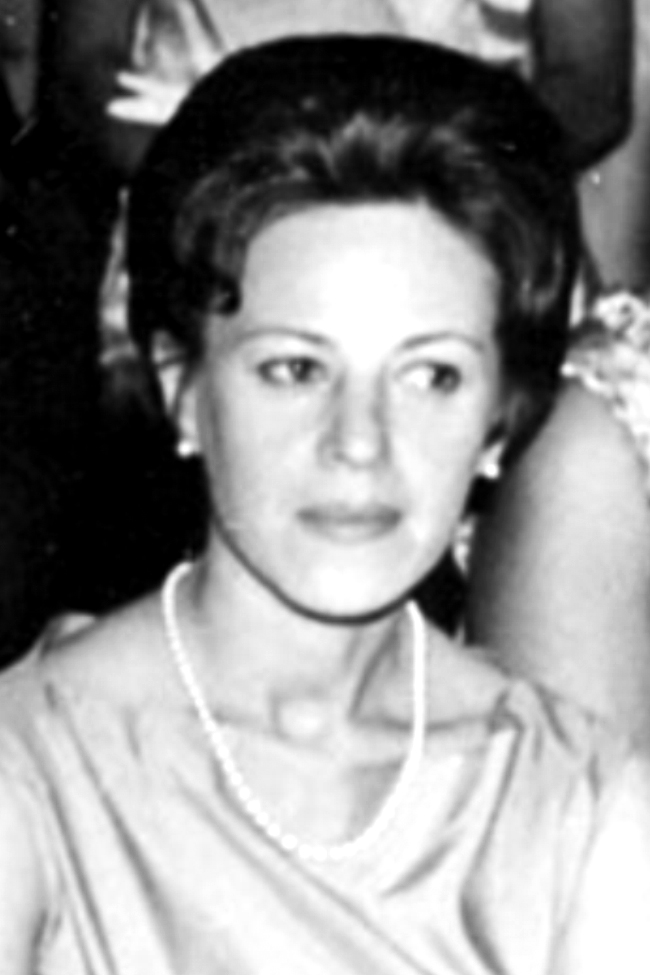
- Berta Ribeiro
- Born: 2 October 1924; Bălți, Bessarabia, Kingdom of Romania (now Moldova)
- Died: 17 November 1997 (aged 73); Rio de Janeiro, Brazil
- Other name: Berta G. Ribeiro
- Education: State University of Rio de Janeiro (UERJ) (undergraduate); University of São Paulo (USP) (doctorate)
- Known for: Authority on the material culture of Brazil's indigenous peoples
- Spouse: Darcy Ribeiro (m. 1948 – sep. 1974)
- Relatives: Genny Gleizer (sister)
- Awards: National Order of Scientific Merit (1995); National Ecology Award (1989); Érico Vanucci Mendes Award (1988); João Ribeiro Award (1957)
- Scientific career
- Fields: Ethnology Anthropology Museology Art Ecology
- Workplaces: Museu do Índio; Museu Nacional
- Thesis: A Civilização da Palha: A Arte do Trançado dos Índios do Brasil (1980) (doctorate)
- Academic advisors: Amadeu José Duarte Lanna

Signature
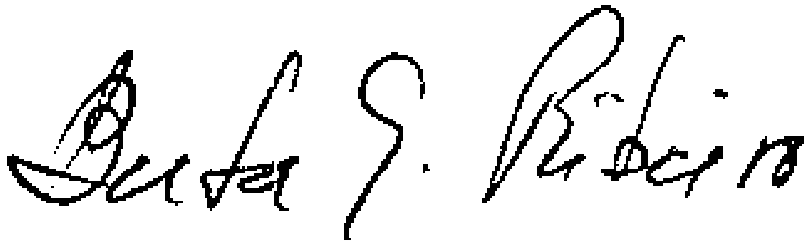

Berta Gleizer Ribeiro CONMC (born Bertha Gleizer; Bălți, 2 October 1924 – Rio de Janeiro, 17 November 1997) was a Moldovan-Brazilian anthropologist, ethnologist, and museologist known for her extensive work on the material culture of Indigenous peoples of Brazil. She was married to anthropologist and senator Darcy Ribeiro.

Born in Bălți, then part of Romania, Berta and her older sister Genny were left in Eastern Europe after their mother’s suicide, as their father had already migrated to Brazil seeking work opportunities amid the antisemitic persecution faced by Jews in the region. Only with the aid of an international organization were they able to reunite with him in 1932. Years later, her sister and father were arrested and deported for alleged subversive activities during a period of intense political repression against Jewish immigrants at the outset of the Vargas dictatorship. Orphaned, Berta was cared for by families of Jewish immigrants under the protection of the Brazilian Communist Party (PCB), later marrying Darcy Ribeiro in 1948.

Berta Ribeiro’s career initially followed the professional and political movements of her husband over the years, but her prominence surged after their separation in the 1970s, when she was already 50 years old. She developed a newfound passion for the knowledge and practices of indigenous peoples, a personal shift that fueled her contributions across various domains: academic, political, cultural, editorial, and artistic, ultimately establishing her as the foremost expert on indigenous material culture in Brazil during her time.

She conducted fieldwork to develop her research, engaging directly with diverse indigenous communities across several Brazilian states. She visited numerous museums worldwide, organized exhibitions on Brazilian indigenous art and culture, and published extensively on indigenous peoples and their customs. She also established key methodological foundations and classification systems for material culture research and ethnographic museum documentation. Her prolific academic, artistic, and cultural output stemmed from her unwavering dedication to her work, as she engaged in multiple roles — researcher, museum collection curator, author of nine books and over forty articles, contributor to various works, and university professor in undergraduate and graduate programs. Until the end of her life, she remained active in the fields of anthropology, museology, ethnology, art, and ecology.

She was a member of the Brazilian Anthropology Association (ABA), the Brazilian Society for the Progress of Science (SBPC), the Regional Museology Council of Rio de Janeiro, and the editorial boards of the journals Ciências em Museus, Ciência Hoje das Crianças, and the Anais do Museu Paulista. She served on the selection committee for postgraduate studies in Visual Arts and taught in the master’s program in History and Art Criticism at the School of Fine Arts (EBA/UFRJ). She acted as an advisor to the National Indigenous People Foundation (FUNAI) and head of museology at the National Museum of Indigenous People (MI), taught in the Anthropology Department of the National Museum, and conducted research for the National Geographic Society.

== Biography ==
=== Family and early years ===
Bertha Gleizer was born on 2 October 1924 in the city of Bălți (now in Moldova), in the Romanian region of Bessarabia. From a Jewish family, she was the daughter of Rosa Sadovinic Gleizer and Motel Gleizer. Her father left the country in July 1929, immigrating to Brazil in search of better living conditions, as the situation for Jews in Romania had become precarious due to rising antisemitism, the emergence of Christian fascist movements, and attacks known as pogroms in the region. Unable to immediately bring his family or provide for them, Motel received news of his wife Rosa’s suicide, as she could no longer endure their dire circumstances, leaving their two daughters alone. Through the intervention of the Jewish Colonisation Association (JCA), an international organization aiding Jewish emigration, and with the help of Rabbi Raffalovich, the girls were brought to Brazil. Berta arrived in Rio de Janeiro as an immigrant at the age of eight, accompanied by her fourteen-year-old sister, Genny Gleizer (sometimes spelled Jenny), in 1932. Living in extreme poverty, the three shared a single room on Riachuelo Street. Her father worked as a merchant near Onze Square, a hub of the Jewish community at the time.

In 1934, Genny moved to São Paulo in search of work but was arrested as a minor by the São Paulo political police on 15 July 1935 for alleged subversive activities. She was held incommunicado for an extended period, enduring physical and psychological torture, and despite widespread public outcry and protests against her detention, she was deported to Romania on the night of 12 October 1935 via the Port of Santos aboard the French cargo ship Aurigny. Upon arriving in France, however, she was rescued and later settled in the United States, where she obtained a degree in psychology. Her case coincided with increased repressive measures under the Vargas government, following the restructuring of the political police and the enactment of the 1935 National Security Law.

Three months after her sister’s deportation, in early 1936 — during the height of political repression against immigrants in Brazil — the political police raided a Jewish workers’ cultural center where the editorial office of the weekly Der Unhoib operated, arresting and deporting most of the foreigners present, including her father, aboard the ship Bagé on 16 April 1936. Reports indicate that Motel was assisted in France along with other expelled immigrants and later died in a concentration camp.

Orphaned in Brazil, Berta lived with Jewish families in Rio de Janeiro and São Paulo between 1936 and 1940 under the care of the Brazilian Communist Party (PCB). In São Paulo, she studied at the Álvares Penteado Commerce School Foundation (FECAP), also attending a technical course in accounting. To fund her studies, she worked as a typist and secretary — roles that allowed her to move into a boarding house in 1940 and live independently from the PCB.

=== Marriage ===
In 1946, Bertha Gleizer met Darcy Ribeiro at a Communist Party demonstration in São Paulo, marrying him in May 1948 when he joined the Indian Protection Service (SPI). Alongside him, she embarked on fieldwork among the Kadiwéu, Kaiowás, Terenas, and Ofaié-Xavantes indigenous groups in southern Mato Grosso. During this period, she started using the name Berta G. Ribeiro, dropping the surname Gleizer, which was not widely known. This change coincided with her concerns about facing a fate similar to that of her family members.

Ribeiro conducted extensive fieldwork, beginning between 1949 and 1951 when she started accompanying her husband. On this, Maria Stella Amorim wrote: “From her love for Darcy came her passion for anthropology,” and these journeys continued almost until the end of her life. Darcy Ribeiro’s autobiographical work, Confessions, includes a passage briefly noting his wife’s role in his life:

She collaborated significantly with me as a research assistant and received her initial training as an ethnologist skilled in direct observation. In the following years, Berta deepened her studies, assisting me in processing the materials collected for my books on the art, religion, and mythology of the Kadiwéu.

— Darcy Ribeiro. Confessions. p. 109

=== Career ===
In 1950, Berta Ribeiro enrolled in a bachelor’s program in Geography and History at the University of the Federal District (UDF) — now Rio de Janeiro State University (UERJ). She graduated in 1953 and began teaching Geography of Brazil at Lafayette Institute. In 1953, she started an internship in the Anthropology Division of the National Museum, initiating her studies to classify the feather adornments of the Urubu-Kaapor Indians, completing her teaching degree in Geography and History in 1954.

Ribeiro developed innovative methodological tools for classifying material culture collections, detailed in Bases para uma Classificação dos Adornos Plumários dos Índios do Brasil, published in 1957. She presented numerous works and organized cultural exhibitions in subsequent years, always focusing on indigenous culture. She received the João Ribeiro Award from the Brazilian Academy of Letters (ABL) for the book Arte Plumária dos Índios Kaapor, co-authored with her husband. Between 1959 and 1960, she conducted bibliographic research for the article Línguas e Culturas Indígenas no Brasil and the book Os Índios e a Civilização by Darcy Ribeiro.

=== Exile ===
Following the 1964 Brazilian coup d'état, Berta Ribeiro and her husband went into exile in Uruguay. She worked on bibliographic research and translation revisions for the book series Estudos de Antropologia da Civilização and the bibliographic and statistical survey for A Universidade Necessária, both by Darcy Ribeiro. The couple returned to Brazil in 1968, but Darcy was imprisoned for eight months at the Santa Cruz Fortress in Niterói. During this period, Bertha corresponded with intellectuals and public figures regarding his situation, contributing to efforts that led to his release. After another arrest warrant from the military regime, the couple went into a second exile in 1969, first to Venezuela, then from 1970 to 1974 in Chile and Peru. In Lima, Berta conducted research on family structure and socialization in a workshop coordinated by Professor Violeta Sara Lafosse, gathering data for her dissertation Crianças Trabalhadoras – Trabalho e Escolaridade de Menores em Lima.

=== Return to Brazil ===
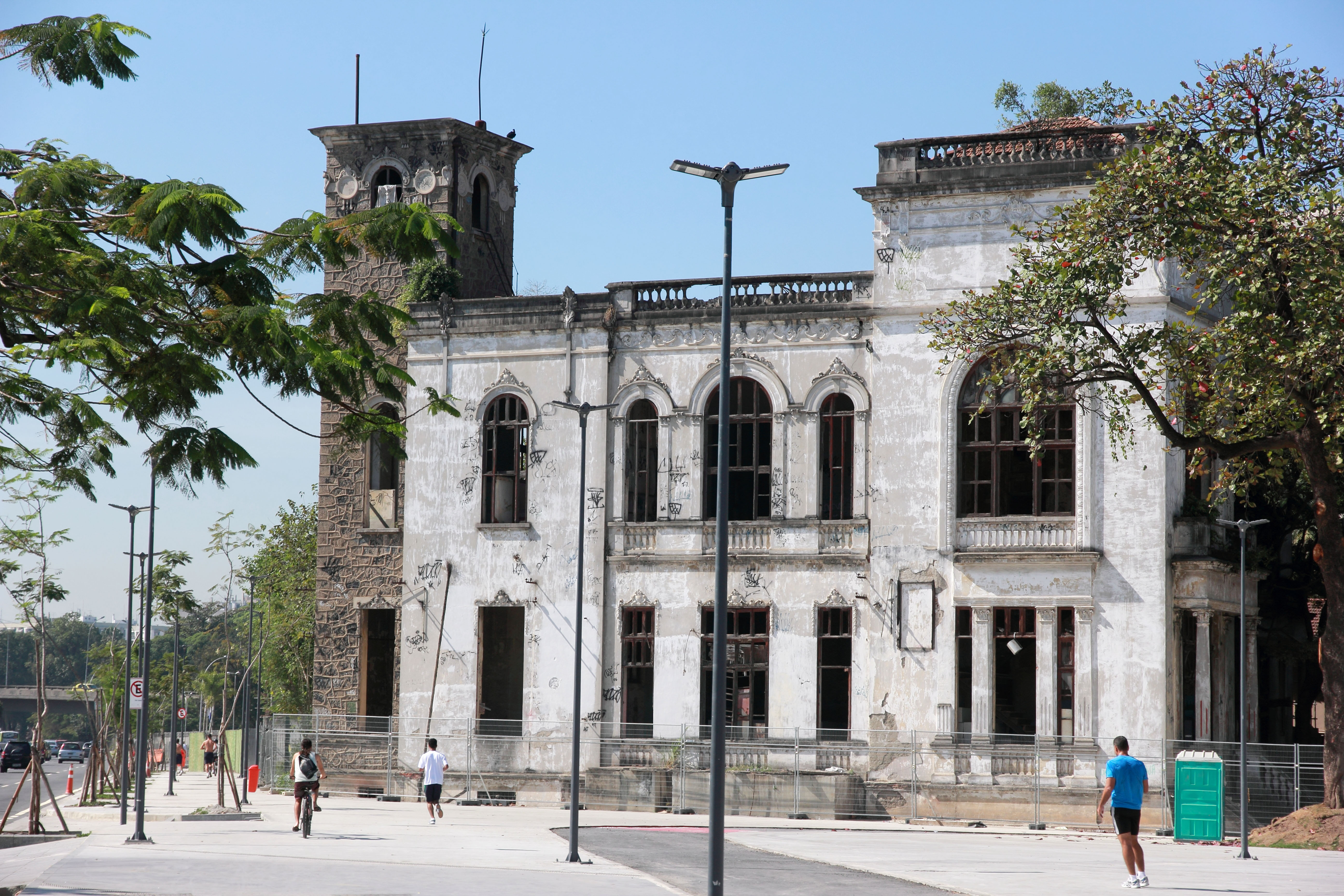
Maracanã Village, the former Indigenous Museum in 2013

In 1974, back in Brazil, she separated from her husband and, the following year, provided consultancy for the development of the Ethnological and Indigenous Documentation Center at the former Rio de Janeiro Indigenous Museum, directed by Carlos de Araújo Moreira Neto. In 1975, she took on the role of assistant director at Paz e Terra publisher. In 1976, she interned in the ethnology and ethnography section of the Anthropology Department at the National Museum and worked as a researcher on the project Etnografia e Emprego Social da Tecnologia Indígena e Popular, coordinated by Maria Heloísa Fenelón Costa. In 1977, she became a Level B Researcher at the National Research Council (CNPq). She visited various indigenous villages in the Upper and Middle Xingu and in Ceará. Between 1978 and 1979, she participated in the Women’s Movement for Amnesty and the campaign for the demarcation of indigenous lands, coordinated by the Indigenous Missionary Council (CIMI).

Given the severity of the threat hanging over the indigenous population and the ecology of the Amazon, no institution committed to the country’s future can exempt itself from taking a stand. Omission means complacency and complicity.

— Berta Ribeiro,

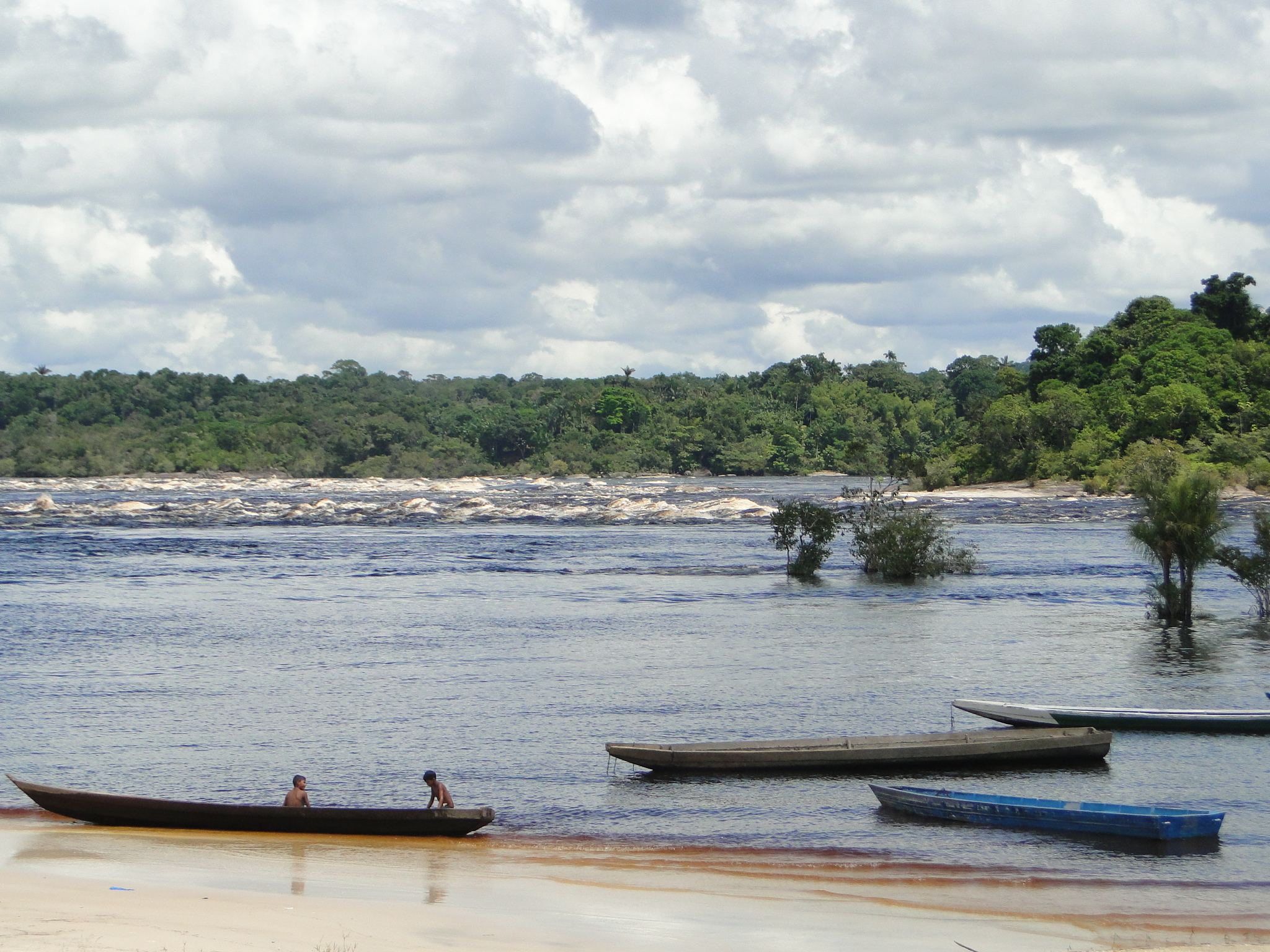
Prainha in São Gabriel da Cachoeira, Upper Rio Negro region

In 1978, while in the Upper Rio Negro region studying indigenous weaving, the anthropologist learned that two indigenous individuals had written the mythology of the Desanos, encouraged earlier by a priest from the Salesian Mission in São Gabriel da Cachoeira to transcribe these narratives. During her time there, when the originals were returned by a publisher, Ribeiro took an interest in the project and assisted father and son — Umúsin Panlõn Kumu (Firmiano Lana) and Tolamãn Kenhirí (Luis Lana) — in revising the text for publication in 1980 as the book Antes o Mundo Não Existia, forging a partnership with the Lana family that lasted until the end of her life. Her publications and discourse consistently reflected her special regard for the Desana among all the indigenous groups she encountered.

In the early 1980s, in Rio de Janeiro, she organized the exhibition Indians of the Black Waters, likely her first as a curator. This exhibition, along with those that followed, focused on aspects of Indigenous life and Amazonian ecological themes. Similarly, the exhibitions Brasilidades at Casa França-Brasil in 1998 and Amazônia Urgente in 1990, accompanied by her homonymous book, were presented at multiple venues, including the Carioca Station in Rio de Janeiro, the São Paulo Cultural Center, Brasília, and the Tancredo Neves Cultural and Tourist Center in Belém.

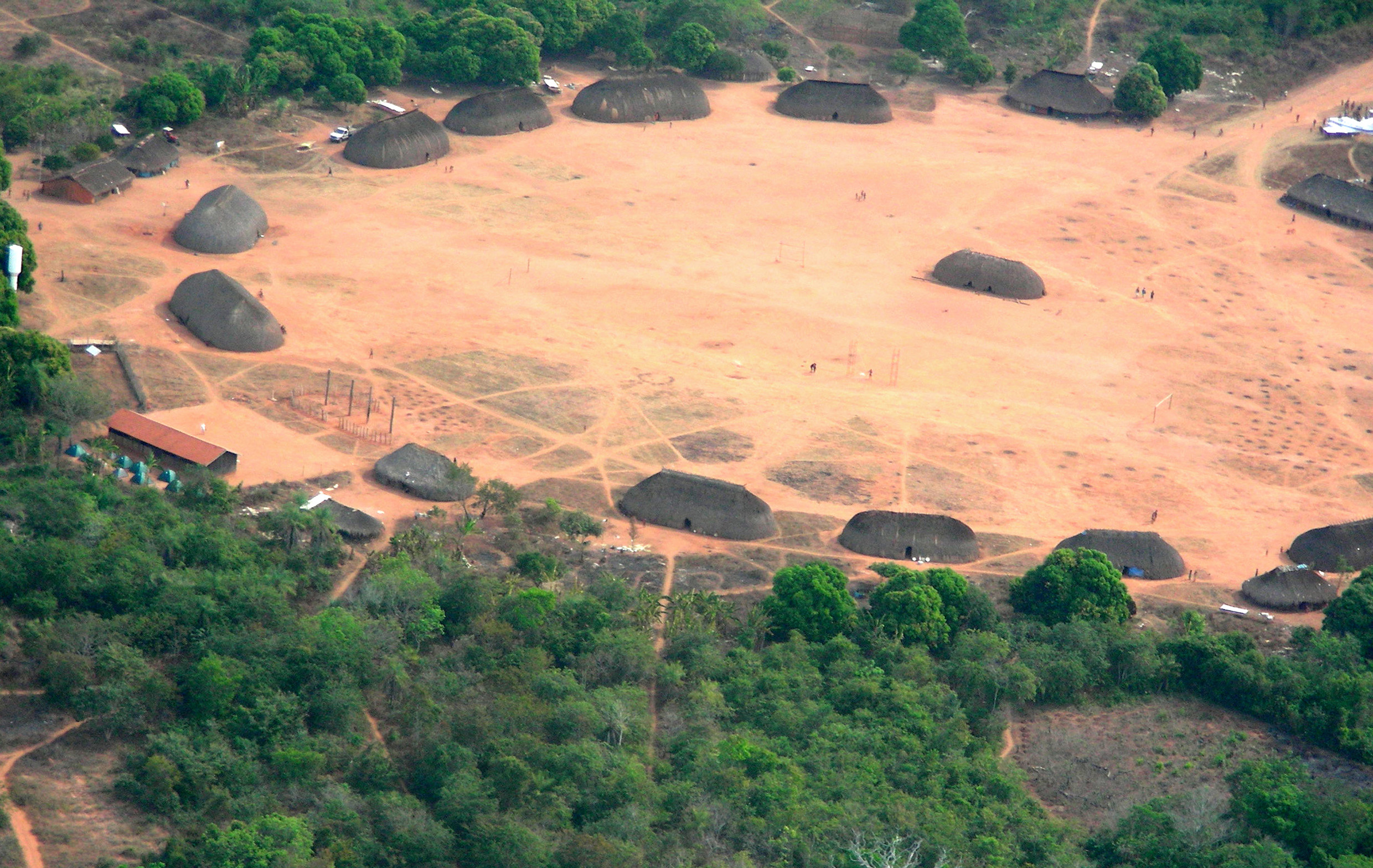
Village in the Xingu Indigenous Park

In 1980, she defended her doctorate at the University of São Paulo (USP) under the guidance of Professor Amadeu José Duarte Lanna. Her thesis, A Civilização da Palha: A Arte do Trançado dos Índios do Brasil, examined Indigenous basketry from the Upper Xingu and Upper Rio Negro, analyzing its technological, productive, and aesthetic aspects. The study included a comparative analysis of artistic production, highlighting the exchange system between these regions.

Between 1980 and 1981, she amassed an extensive collection of artifacts, drawings, photographs, and samples of vegetable specimens, clay, and dye. She documented techniques of spinning, weaving, interlaced weaving (filé), and the use of dyes and yarn among the Kayabi, Juruna, Mentuktire, Ikpeng, and Yawalapiti, contributing them to the National Museum's collection. (Note: On the night of 2 September 2018, a massive fire destroyed nearly the entirety of the historical and scientific collection at the institution. Almost all collections in archaeology, paleontology, anthropology, and invertebrates, along with research laboratories and classrooms, were lost, as was the Francesca Keller library, which held a vast anthropology collection, completely consumed by the flames. Reconstruction of the Museu Nacional began three years after the fire.)

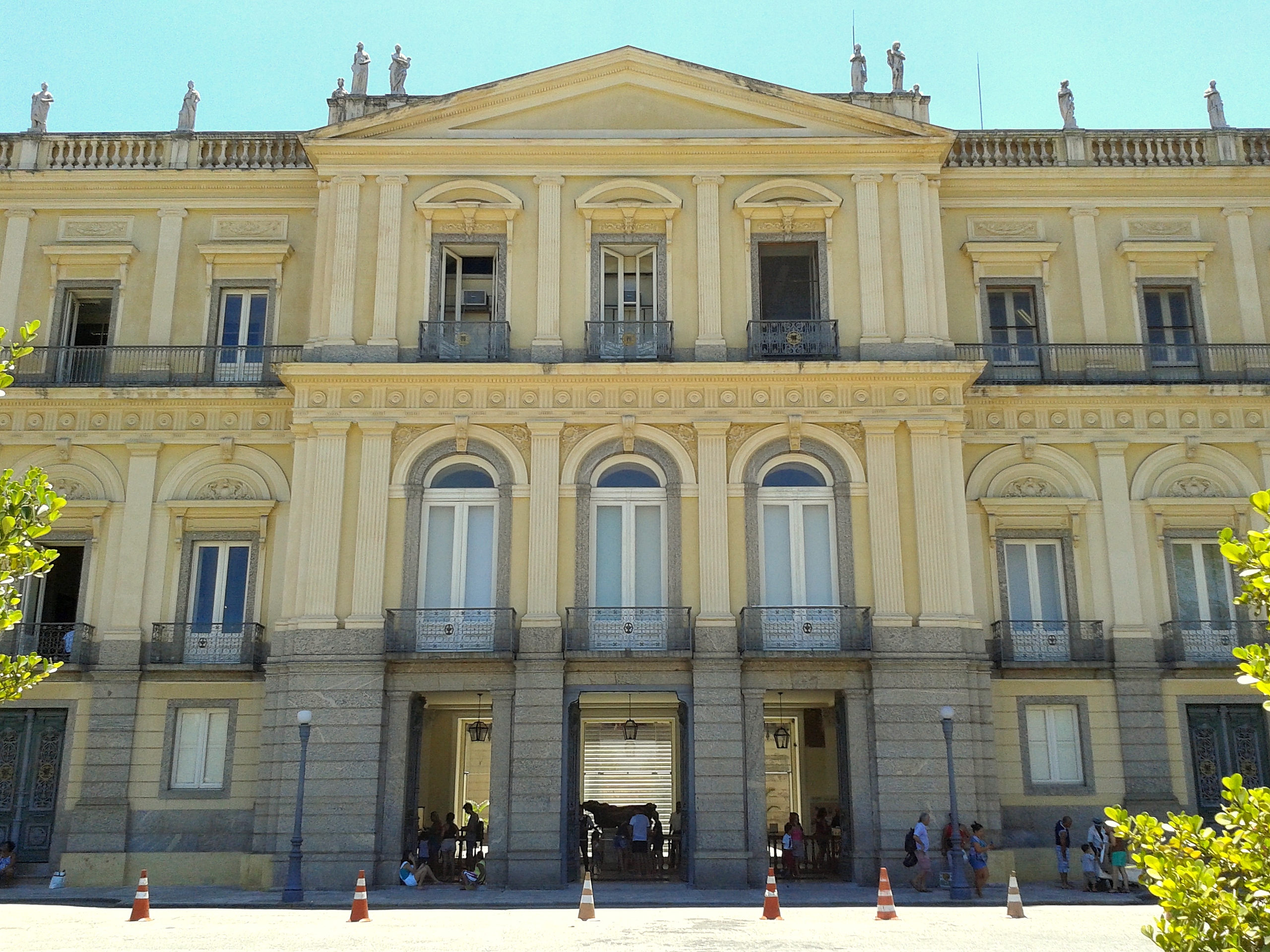
Facade of the National Museum in 2015

Between 1982 and 1983, she began developing and coordinating the journal Suma Etnológica Brasileira, and in 1984, she took over as general coordinator of its editorial board, with her ex-husband Darcy Ribeiro as editor. Also in 1983, she published O Índio na História do Brasil, a collection edited by Jayme Pinsky aimed at former high school and university students, divided into two parts: the first presenting indigenous peoples in Brazilian history from colonization to the late 20th century, and the second addressing their contributions to Brazilian culture.

She served as an advisor to the National Indigenous People Foundation (FUNAI) and head of museology at the same institution in 1985, as well as a visiting professor in the master’s program at the School of Fine Arts (EBA). In 1988, she secured a position through a competitive exam as a Level 1 Assistant Professor in the Anthropology Department of the National Museum, leaving the Indigenous Museum, and that same year published the Dicionário do Artesanato Indígena, a reference work in ethnomuseology where she described and analyzed various objects of indigenous material culture, classifying them by technique, raw material, and form. In 1989, she published Indigenous Arte Indígena, Linguagem Visual, which explored the aesthetic expressions of Brazilian Indigenous peoples through specific case studies, as noted in the preface. Her 1991 book, O Índio na Cultura Brasileira, addressed Indigenous contributions to Brazilian culture in areas such as botany, zoology, material culture, art, and language.

In 1994, she organized a project for cartoons to be part of a film series titled Mito e Morte no Amazonas, based on legends from the book Antes o Mundo Não Existia, comprising the short films: Gaín Pañan e a Origem da Pupunheira, Bali Bó, and O Começo Antes do Começo — of the three, only the first was completed by the Federal University of Rio de Janeiro (UFRJ), where she was a faculty member. In her final book, Os Índios das Águas Pretas, published in 1995, she addressed topics related to ecology and material culture, aiming, in her own words, “to provoke reflection on the creativity of indigenous cultures, the ecological knowledge of the Indian, and the Brazilian indigenous legacy passed down to millions of rural inhabitants.”

=== Retirement and death ===
Ribeiro made her work the purpose of her life, as she told her friend Maria Stella Amorim:

I cannot be Jewish because I have no religion... I have no family, no husband, no children. I am alone. All I have is my work with the Indians. I owe them what I am... I feel Desana.

— Berta Ribeiro

Due to a cancerous tumor, she fell into a coma in 1995. The following year, she retired due to the advanced stage of the illness, dying on 17 November 1997 at age 73, nine months after the death of her ex-husband.

== Personal life ==
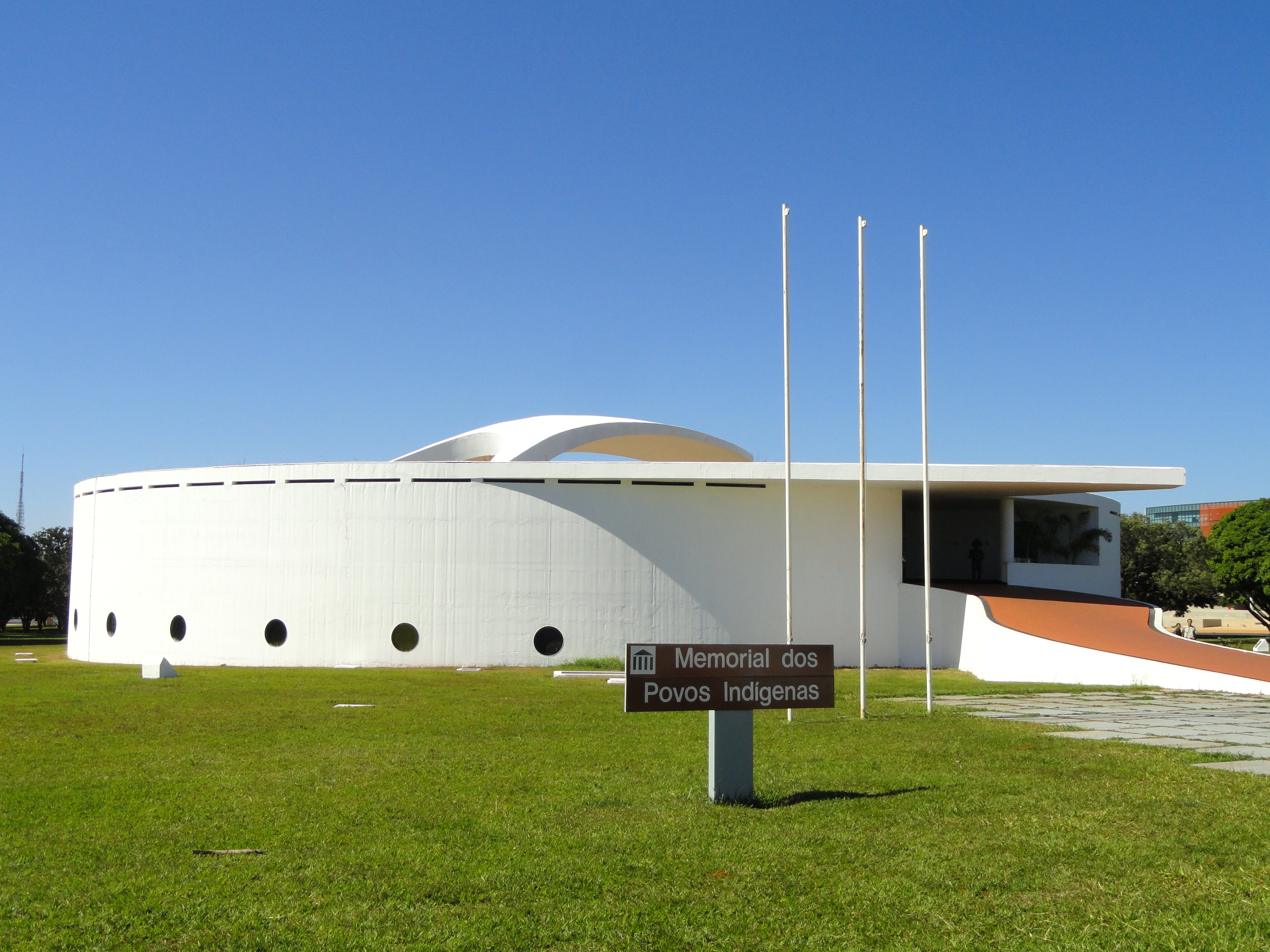
Memorial of Indigenous Peoples in 2012

When not in the field, Ribeiro retreated to her office in her Copacabana apartment in Rio de Janeiro, where she used a typewriter to draft articles, books, and letters, later adopting email. Her apartment shelves reflected her acquisitions, exchanges, and a body of work that included nine published books and over forty articles, as well as a personal collection of approximately 368 items gathered over more than forty years of ethnographic research across various indigenous communities in Brazil’s interior since the 1950s, with contributions from Darcy Ribeiro and anthropologist Eduardo Galvão — intended to support the establishment of a Museum of Indigenous Peoples in Brasília, now the Memorial of Indigenous Peoples. Donated by Darcy Ribeiro in 1995, these objects were officially incorporated into the institution’s permanent collection in April 2020 during Brasília’s 60th-anniversary celebrations, 33 years after the museum’s construction.

== Recognition ==
Ribeiro experienced the loss of her family due to antisemitism in Romania and political repression under Brazilian dictatorships. Later, she engaged in advocacy for cultural diversity and indigenous rights. She worked as a museum collection curator and organized exhibitions on Indigenous topics. Her contributions to contemporary anthropology included a focus on material culture, encompassing objects and artifacts produced by Indigenous peoples. She collaborated with Firmiano Lana and his son Luis Lana on the publication of Antes o Mundo Não Existia, a mythology book written and illustrated by Indigenous individuals, published in 1980 and later translated into Spanish and Italian.

She collected material goods from the Indigenous groups she studied, a practice that extended to donations to institutions such as the Paraense Emílio Goeldi Museum, which received a significant Asurini collection from her. Institutionally, she was affiliated with the Indigenous Museum and the National Museum, working as a researcher and curator of ethnographic collections. As a professor at the Federal University of Rio de Janeiro, she taught postgraduate courses in art history on “Indigenous Art in Brazil” and “Material Culture and Ethnic Art,” guiding students in her areas of expertise. She also published museological studies and supported their role in public education and the Indigenous cause, despite their limited recognition in academic circles.

In the anthropology of art, she examined the symbolism of indigenous graphic patterns, identifying connections with cosmology in ritual patterns, mythology, and warrior activities. She approached art and material culture as expressions of Indigenous alterity, placing them alongside ethnological topics such as kinship, social relations, and religion.

== Awards and nominations ==
Brief list:

- 1957 - Received the João Ribeiro Award (philology, ethnography, and folklore) from the Brazilian Academy of Letters (ABL) for the book Arte Plumária dos Índios Kaapor, co-authored with Darcy Ribeiro.
- 1983 - Won first place for the essay “Artesanato Indígena: Para que, para quem?”—published in O Artesão Tradicional e o seu Papel na Sociedade Contemporânea—in a contest held by the National Folklore Institute (INF) for the Inter-American Year of Crafts (OEA).
- 1984 - Took second place at the XV Rio de Janeiro Scientific Film Festival in the Films on Videocassette category for Documentários sobre os Índios Asuriní e Araweté, co-produced with Fred Ribeiro.
- 1988 - Received the Érico Vanucci Mendes Award for efforts in preserving national memory, popular traditions, and cultural traits during the 40th RASBPC. She delivered the lecture “Arte Indígena: Patrimônio Cultural” at the Faculty of Architecture and Urbanism of the University of São Paulo (USP).
- 1989 - Received an “Honorable Mention” at the National Ecology Award for the work Amazônia Urgente: Cinco Séculos de História e Ecologia.
- 1995 - Awarded the commendation of the National Order of Scientific Merit by the Brazilian Government, presented at her home due to her severe illness.

== Tributes ==
On 14 August 1995, the then Minister of Science and Technology José Israel Vargas presented Berta Ribeiro with the National Order of Scientific Merit at her residence in Rio de Janeiro due to her illness. The ceremony took place in the presence of architect Oscar Niemeyer and her ex-husband Darcy Ribeiro. The Medal of Commandery, conferred by the Brazilian Government, acknowledged her work in anthropological studies and her production of scientific knowledge. During the event, Berta asked the minister to support the opening of the Museum of Indigenous Peoples in Brasília, to which she planned to donate her personal collection.

=== Posthumous ===
At the 2nd edition of the Prêmio Escritas Sociais: Diversidades Culturais, held by the Social Sciences course at the Federal University of Tocantins (UFT) in 2017, she was honored for her contributions to cultural diversity, a recurring theme in her research among Brazil’s indigenous peoples.

In 2022, on International Women’s Day, the Technical Reserve "Berta Ribeiro" was named in her honor at the Indigenous Museum (MI) in Rio de Janeiro where she coordinated the museology sector and cataloged most of the collection’s items until the 1980s.

== Legacy ==
Bertha Ribeiro’s work is referenced by researchers and scholars in museology and anthropology globally. Publications like Bases para uma Classificação dos Adornos Plumários dos Índios do Brasil, the volumes of the Suma Etnológica Brasileira, and the Dicionário do Artesanato Indígena provide methodological and classificatory frameworks for material culture research and ethnographic museum documentation, based on tools she developed for studying material culture.

=== Darcy Ribeiro Foundation ===
During her 27-year marriage to Darcy Ribeiro, Bertha Ribeiro contributed to the development of his works by revising, translating, and organizing numerous letters and documents from his professional life. These efforts supported the creation of the Darcy Ribeiro Foundation (Fundar), an archive that includes the documentary collections and libraries of both anthropologists. The foundation was established following Darcy’s intent to preserve his intellectual legacy beyond his political career.

== Personal collection ==
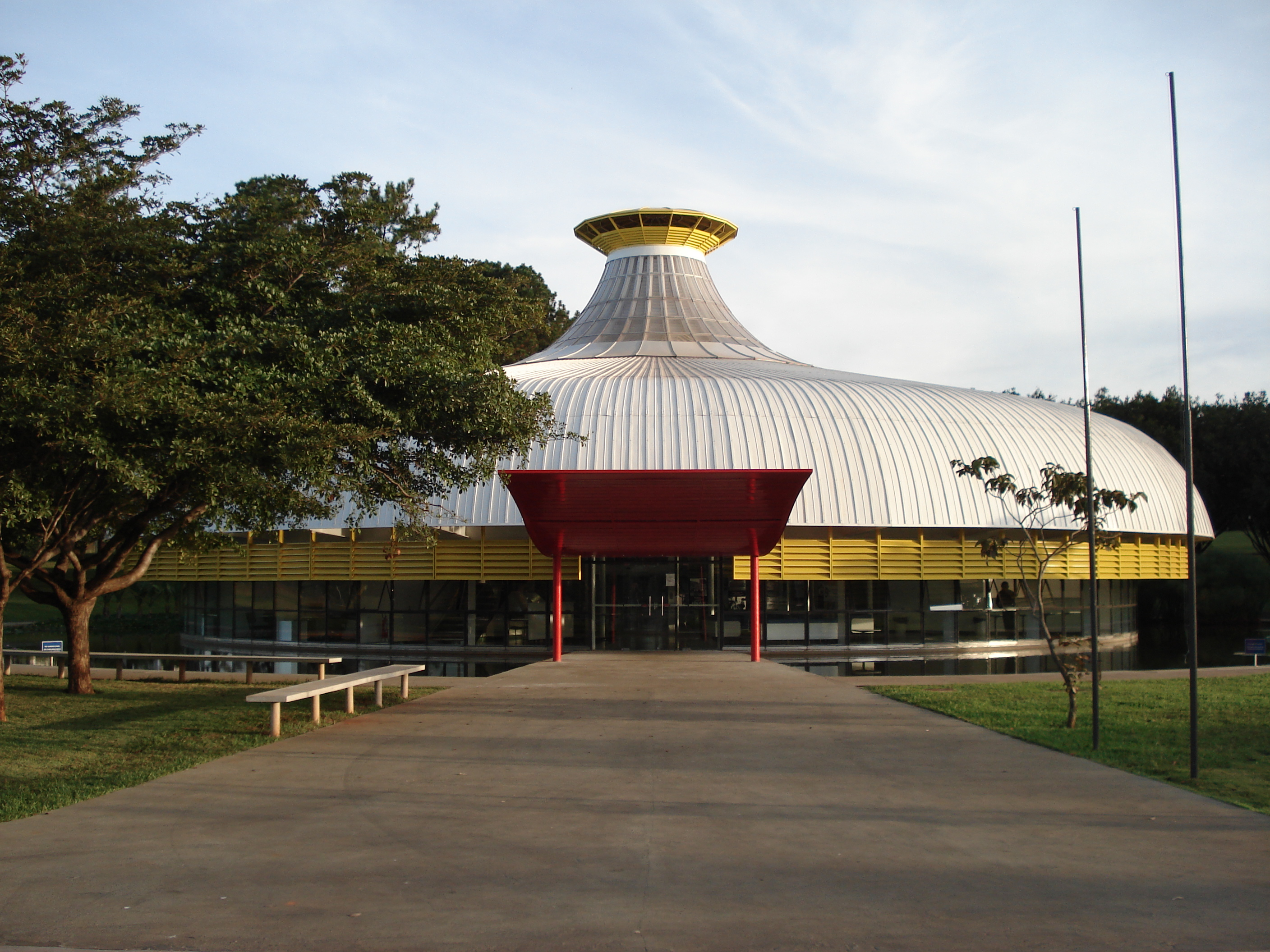
Memorial Darcy Ribeiro (Beijódromo) in 2011

Berta Ribeiro’s personal collection, alongside that of her former spouse, resides in a library within the Darcy Ribeiro Memorial at the University of Brasília. This collection encompasses approximately 30,000 volumes of documents, amassed over more than five decades of wide-ranging work across multiple fields of knowledge. It includes two extensive, complementary archives featuring textual, iconographic, filmographic, and audio materials, which document not only the cultural and scientific contributions of their creators but also the expressions, memories, and histories of communities that have influenced Brazilian and Latin American society. The collections of Darcy and Berta Ribeiro, spanning various media, reflect their lifelong individual and joint efforts in research and publication within the realms of ethnology, anthropology, culture, and politics.

== Writings ==
List of the anthropologist’s publications, compiled by researcher Lucia Hussak van Velthen:

=== Articles in catalogs ===
- 1980 - "A Arte Plumária dos Índios Urubus-Kaapor". Arte Plumária do Brasil. (catálog). São Paulo: Museu de Arte Moderna, pp. 26-28
- 1983 - "Contributi Indigeni alla Cultura Contemporanea". Indios del Brasile. Culture che Scompaiono. Roma: Soprintendenza Speciale al Museo Preistorico ed Etnografico Luigi Pigorini. pp. 29-32
- 1984 - "Arte Gráfica Kadiwéu". Arte e Corpo: Pintura sobre a Pele e Adornos de Povos Indígenas Brasileiros. (catálog). Rio de Janeiro: FUNARTE, pp. 39-46
- 1984 - "Arte Gráfica Juruna". Arte e Corpo: Pintura sobre a Pele e Adornos de Povos Indígenas Brasileiros — catalog. Rio de Janeiro: FUNARTE, pp. 75-82
- 1995 - "Arte Indígena: Linguaggio Visuale". I Segni del Tempo: Identità e Mutamento. Arte, Cultura e Storia di Tre Etnie del Brasile. Roma: Edizioni Seam. pp. 89-112

=== Articles in journals ===
- 1957 - "Bases para uma Classificação dos Adornos Plumários dos Índios do Brasil". Arquivos do Museu Nacional 43. pp. 59-128
- 1978 - "O Artesanato Indígena como Bem Comerciável". Ensaios de Opinião 5. pp. 68-77
- 1979 - "Arte Indígena, Linguagem Visual". Ensaios de Opinião 7. pp. 101-110
- 1980 - "Possibilidade de Aplicação do “Critério de Forma” no Estudo de Contatos Intertribais, pelo Exame da Técnica de Remate e Pintura de Cestos" Revista de Antropologia 23. pp. 31-67
- 1982 - "A Oleira e a Tecelã: O Papel Social da Mulher na Sociedade Asuriní". Revista de Antropologia 25. pp. 25-61
- 1983 - "Araweté: A Índia Vestida". Revista de Antropologia 26. pp. 1-38
- 1985a - "Museu: Veículo Comunicador e Pedagógico". Revista Brasileira de Pedagogia 66 (152). pp. 77-98
- 1985b - "Tecelãs Tupi do Xingu: Kayabi, Juruna, Asuriní, Araweté". Revista de Antropologia 27-28. pp. 355-402
- 1986 - "Os Estudos de Cultura Material: Propósitos e Métodos". Revista do Museu Paulista 30. pp. 13-41
- 1987a - (Em co-autoria com T. Kenhíri) "Chuvas e Constelações". Ciência Hoje 36. pp. 26-35
- 1987b - "Museu do Índio, Brasília". Cadernos RioArte 3 (7).
- 1989 - "Museu e Memória. Reflexões sobre o Colecionamento". Ciências em Museus 1(2). pp. 109-122
- 1990a - "Cultura Material: Objetos e Símbolos". Ciências em Museus 2. pp. 17-2
- 1990b - "Perspectivas Etnológicas para Arqueólogos: (1957-1988)". BIB- Anpocs 29.
- 1991a - (Em co-autoria com T. Kenhíri) "Chuvas e Constelações: Calendário Econômico dos Índios Desana". Ciência Hoje, Volume Especial Amazônia. pp. 14-23
- 1991b - "Literatura Oral Indígena: O Exemplo Desana". Ciência Hoje, Volume Especial Amazônia. pp. 32-41
- 1992 - "Coleções Museológicas: Do Estudo à Exposição". Ciências em Museus 4. pp. 73-4

=== Articles in foreign journals ===
- 1981 - "O Artesanato Cesteiro como Objeto de Comércio entre os Índios do Alto Rio Negro, Amazonas". América Indígena 61(2). pp. 289-310
- 1986 - "La Vannerie et l’Art Décoratif des Indiens du Haut Xingu, Brésil". Objets et Mondes, Revue du Musèe de l'Homme 24 (1-2). pp. 57-68
- 1991 - "Ao Vencedor, as Batatas. Plantas Ameríndias, Oferendas à Humanidade". Trabalhos de Antropologia e Etnologia 31. Issues 1-4 (Tribute to Ernesto Veiga de Oliveira). pp. 99-112
- 1993 - "Les Poupées Karajá". La Revue de la Céramique et du Verre 68. pp. 34-35
- 1995 - "Parque Indígena de Xingu: Laboratorio de Intercambio Cultural". Artesanías de América Cuenca 46-47. pp. 117-30

=== Book chapters ===
- 1959 - (Em co-autoria com J. C. de Melo Carvalho). "Curare: A Weapon for Hunting and Warfare". In Curare and Curare-Like Agents. (D. Bovet et alii, orgs.). Amsterdam. pp. 34-59
- 1983a - "Artesanato Indígena: Para que, para quem?". In O Artesão Tradicional e seu Papel na Sociedade Contemporânea. Rio de Janeiro: FUNARTE/INF. pp. 11-48
- 1983b - "O Índio Brasileiro: Homo Faber, Homo Ludens". ln A Itália e o Brasil Indígena. Rio de Janeiro: Index Editora. pp. 13-23
- 1985 - "Artesanato Indígena: Porque e para quem?". In As Artes Visuais na Amazônia: Reflexões sobre uma Visualidade Regional. Belém: FUNARTE/SEMEC. pp. 23-42
- 1986a - "A Arte de Trançar: Dois Macroestilos, dois Modos de Vida". In Suma Etnológica Brasileira II: Tecnologia Indígena (D. Ribeiro, ed.). Petrópolis: Vozes/FINEP. pp. 283-313
- 1986b - "Glossário dos Trançados". In Suma Etnológica Brasileira II: Tecnologia Indígena (D. Ribeiro, ed.). Petrópolis: Vozes/FINEP. pp. 314-22
- 1986c - "Artes Têxteis Indígenas do Brasil". In Suma Etnológica Brasileira II: Tecnologia Indígena (D. Ribeiro, ed.). Petrópolis: Vozes/FINEP. pp. 351-89
- 1986d - "Glossário dos Tecidos". In Suma Etnológica Brasileira II: Tecnologia Indígena (D. Ribeiro, ed.). Petrópolis: Vozes/FINEP. pp. 390-96
- 1986e - "A Linguagem Simbólica da Cultura Material". In Suma Etnológica Brasileira III: Arte Índia (D. Ribeiro, ed.). Petrópolis: Vozes/FINEP. pp. 15-28
- 1986f - "Bases para uma Classificação dos Adornos Plumários dos Índios do Brasil". In Suma Etnológica Brasileira III: Arte Índia (D. Ribeiro, ed.). Petrópolis: Vozes/FINEP. pp. 189-226
- 1986g - "Desenhos Semânticos e Identidade Étnica: O Caso Kayabi". In Suma Etnológica Brasileira III: Arte Índia (D. Ribeiro, ed.). Petrópolis: Vozes/FINEP. pp. 265-86
- 1987 - '"Visual Categories and Ethnic Identity: The Symbolism of Kayabi Indian Basketry (Mato Grosso, Brazil)". In Material Anthropology: Contemporary Approaches to Material Culture (Reynolds e Stott, orgs.). Washington, D.C.: University Press of America, pp. 189-230
- 1988a - "Semantische Zeichnungen und Ethnische Identităt: Das Beispiel der Kayabi". In Die Mythen Sehen. Bilder und Zeichen vom Amazonas (Mark Munzel. org.). Museum für Volkerkunde, Band 14. pp. 391-450
- 1988b - "Die Bildliche Mytologie der Desâna". In Die Mythen Sehen. Bilder und Zeichen vom Amazonas (Mark Munzel, org.). Museum fur Volkerkunde, Band 14: 243-77
- 1992a - "A Mitologia Pictórica dos Desâna". In Grafismo Indígena: Estudos de Antropologia Estética (Lux Vidal, org.). São Paulo: Nobel. pp. 35-42
- 1992b - "As Artes da Vida do Indígena Brasileiro". In Índios no Brasil (Luiz Donisete Benzi Grupioni, org.) Brasília: MEC. pp. 135-44
- 1992c - (Co-authored with L. H. van Velthem) "Coleções Etnográficas: Documentos Materiais para a História Índígena e a Etnologia". In História dos Índios no Brasil (Manuela Carneiro da Cunha, org.). São Paulo: FAPESP/Companhia das Letras. pp. 103-14
- 1993 - "Os Padrões Ornamentais do Trançado e a Arte Decorativa dos Índios do Alto Xingu". In Karl von den Steinen: Um Século de Antropologia no Xingu. São Paulo: EDUSP. pp. 563-89
- 1995 - “A Contribuição dos Povos Indígenas à Cultura Brasileira.” In A Temática Indígena na Escola: Novos Subsídios para Professores de 1⁰ e 2⁰ Graus (Aracy Lopes da Silva and Luís D. B. Grupioni, eds.). Brasília: MEC/MARI/UNESCO. pp. 197-220

=== Books ===
- 1957 - (Co-authored with Darcy Ribeiro). Arte Plumária dos Índios Kaapor. Rio de Janeiro: Seikel. 154 pp.
- 1979 - Diário do Xingu. Rio de Janeiro: Paz e Terra. 265 pp.
- 1983 - O Índio na História do Brasil. Rio de Janeiro: Global (Popular History Collection 13). 125 pp.
- 1985 - A Arte do Trançado dos Índios do Brasil: Um Estudo Taxonômico. Belém: MPEG. 185 pp.
- 1987 - O Índio na Cultura Brasileira. Rio de Janeiro: Unibrade/UNESCO. 186 pp.
- 1988 - Dicionário do Artesanato Indígena. Belo Horizonte: Editora Itatiaia/EDUSP. 343 pp.
- 1989 - Arte Indígena, Linguagem Visual. Belo Horizonte: Editora Itatiaia/EDUSP. 186 pp.
- 1990 - Amazônia Urgente: Cinco Séculos de História e Ecologia. Belo Horizonte: Editora Itatiaia. 272 pp.
- 1995 - Os Índios das Águas Pretas: Modo de Produção e Equipamento Produtivo. São Paulo: Companhia das Letras/EDUSP. 269 pp.

=== Unpublished texts ===
- 1980 - A Civilização da Palha: A Arte do Trançado dos Índios do Brasil. University of São Paulo, Doctoral Thesis. 590 pp. (Note: “A Civilização da Palha: A Arte do Trançado dos Índios do Brasil” (Parts 1 and 2) is available for viewing in the digital library of the Indigenous Museum.)
- 1988 - Classificação dos Solos e Horticultura Desana. 18 pp. (Note: A typed copy is available for viewing and download in the virtual collection of the Socioenvironmental Institute (ISA).)
- 1994(?) - Índios do Brasil: 500 Anos de Resistência. Ms.

== See also ==
- Vargas Era
- World War II
- Brazilian military dictatorship
- Indigenous peoples in Brazil
- Indigenous Brazilian art
- Indigenous Brazilian music
