= Maracanã Village =

Historic building in Rio de Janeiro, Brazil

Marak'anà Village
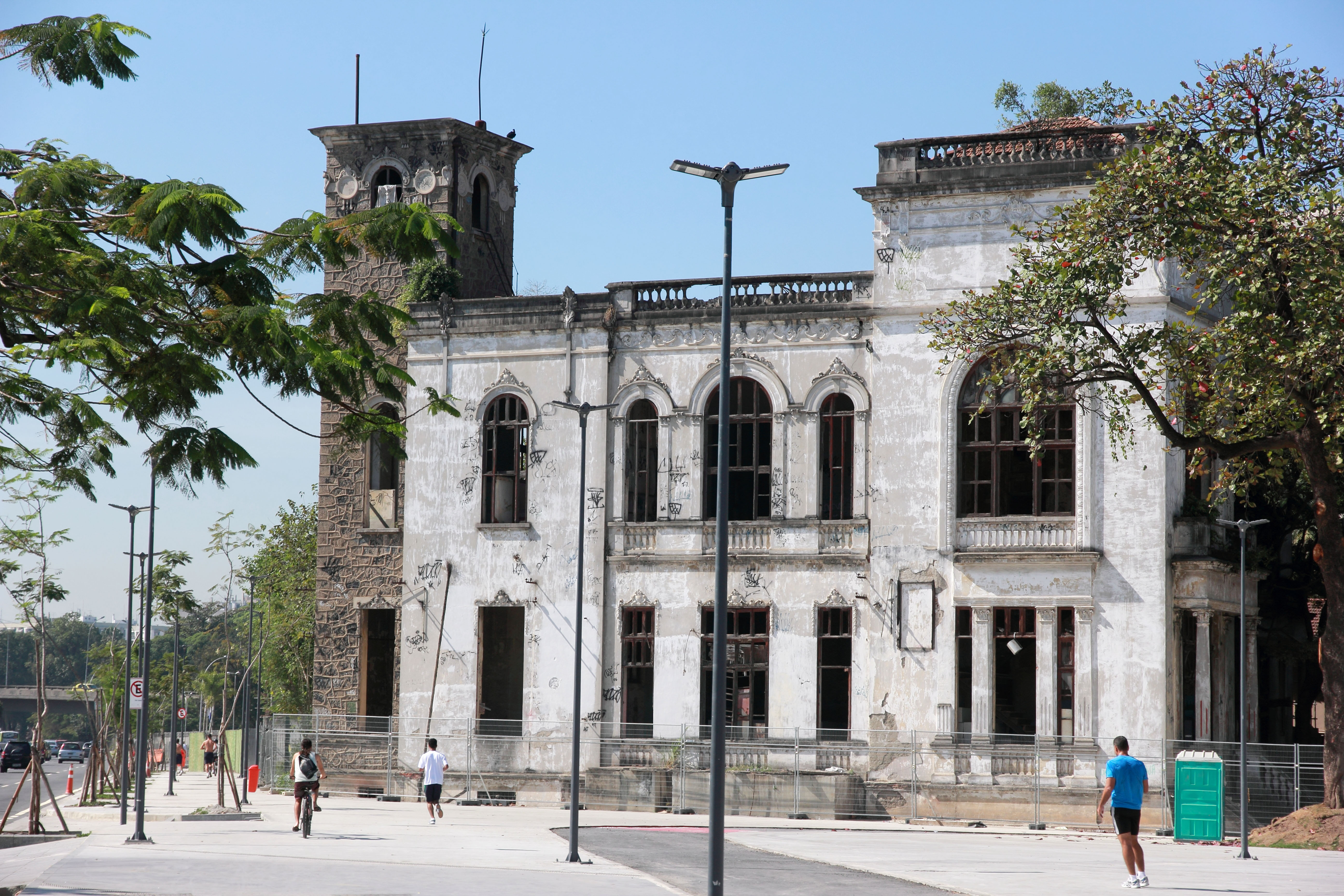
- Location: Rio de Janeiro, Brazil
- Coordinates: 22°54′45″S 43°13′36″W
- Type: building historic site
- Location of Maracanã Village

Maracanã Village, also known as the Old Indian Museum, is an urban Indian village in the old building of the Indian Museum in the Maracanã neighborhood of Rio de Janeiro. The building is near the Estadio Mario Filho, which is at risk of demolition by the state government of Rio de Janeiro state government. The controversy surrounding maintenance of the village fed popular political movements in the city, and the village is considered symbolic of opposition to the government of Sérgio Cabral Filho. Maracanã Stadium was the main stadium for the 2016 Summer Olympics, and Maracanã was the name of one of the four zones of the Olympic Village.

== Background ==
The building was constructed in 1862 by Dom Luís Augusto. In 1910 it was donated to the Fundação Nacional do Índio, a state agency which sought to preserve Brazil's indigenous culture. The agency, founded that year, was led by Cândido Rondon.

The building was the federal agency's original headquarters. From 1953 to 1977, Darcy Ribeiro converted it into the Indian Museum. The museum was then transferred to Botafogo, and the building was abandoned. In 2006 the site was occupied by a group of about 20 indigenous settlers, who called the area the Maracana Village. The site was purchased by the Rio de Janeiro government in August 2012. To ease exiting Stadium Maracanã for the 2014 World Cup, the Old Indian Museum, the Municipal School Athletic Stadium Friendenreich and Celio de Barros would be demolished.

The proposed demolitions were controversial. According to the government, the museum demolition was required by FIFA and the property had no historical value. In response, in 2013, three councilors proposed a bill to register the building. Its proposed demolition was criticized, and it was speculated that its purpose was for the construction of a large parking facility.

Minister of Culture Marta Suplicy asked Rio de Janeiro governor Luiz Fernando Pezão for permission to maintain the building, and in January 2013 the municipal council for the protection of cultural heritage gave its unanimous support. That month, after the Indians obtained an injunction preventing the demolition, the state government agreed not to demolish the building until the local Indians left; the building would be renovated and kept intact. There was no timetable or decision about the building's ultimate fate, and the proposed settlement was rejected by village leaders.

On March 22, 2013, the Maracana Village was occupied by the police and the Indians withdrew. Protests by a number of social and political groups followed, and state representative Marcelo Freixo (who was tear gassed) criticized the police action. A Femen activist was arrested when she exposed her breasts in protest.
