= Public Archive for the State of Rio de Janeiro =

State government agency in Brazil

- Arquivo Público do Estado do Rio de Janeiro
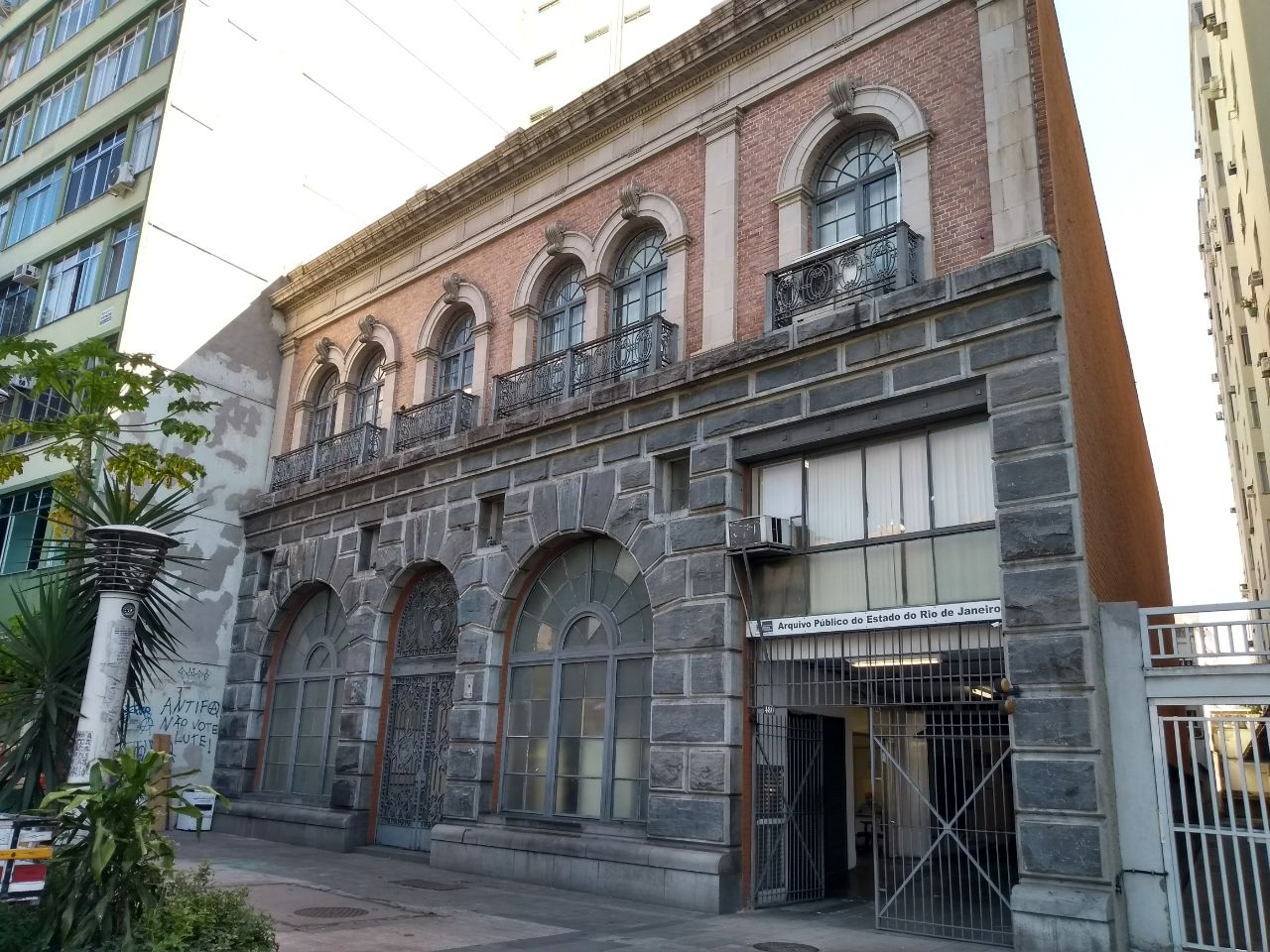
- 22.95002°S 43.18204°W
- Location: Praia de Botafogo, n. 480, Botafogo, Rio de Janeiro, Brazil
- Established: 25 August 1931; 95 years ago

Other information
- Website: www.aperj.rj.gov.br

The Public Archive for the State of Rio de Janeiro (Portuguese: Arquivo Público do Estado do Rio de Janeiro, APERJ) is an agency of the Government of the State of Rio de Janeiro, Brazil that is responsible for archiving for the state administration.

APERJ is an integral part of the structure of the civil government under the Secretary of State. It is responsible for the collection and preservation of documents produced by the state government and its executives and an archive of materials ranging from the 18th century to the present day. The archive contains 4,000 linear meters of documents, including maps, blueprints, photographs, microfilms, audiotapes, videotapes, and movies. The APERJ also offers a library of secondary sources, specializing in legislation, history, and archival science. It is a part of the Conselho Nacional de Arquivos (CONARQ), as decreed by Law 8.159, passed on January 8, 1991.

The archive is open Monday through Friday, from 9am to 5pm. It is located in the Botafogo neighborhood of Rio de Janeiro in Brazil. Access to documentation is free and open to any researcher, foreign or national. Researchers are assisted by staff members in the identification of relevant documents and protocol for their proper review. Users have access to print and electronic research tools and are required to register their personal information upon arrival. As a registered user at the APERJ, researchers are required to sign in and out during each session. Only pencils, erasers, and loose sheets of paper, and personal computers are allowed in the consultation room (sala de consultas) for notation.

== History ==
The APERJ was created by government Decree n. 2638 on 25 August 1931. Originally named the General Archive of the State (Arquivo Geral do Estado), it was under the jurisdiction of the Director of the Interior and of Justice and located in Niterói, Rio de Janeiro. Among its responsibilities, it was to receive, classify, preserve, and organize the papers and books pertinent to the Secretary of the State of Rio de Janeiro. It was also tasked with cataloging collections of laws, decrees, and legislative deliberations annually to be published. Two years later, the Archive's name changed to the Public Archive and University Library (Arquivo Público e Biblioteca Universitária). In 1938, the Archive was separated from the Library but remained under the purview of the Justice Secretary until 1958 when it went under the Secretary of Administration.

In 1961, the documentation for the President of the Province and the President of the State of Rio de Janeiro was contained in the basement of the Aurelino Leal school, part of the palace for the President of the Province in Niterói. The collections were transferred to the Public Archive and, later, to the Sala Matoso Maia de Documentação Fluminense at the Rio de Janeiro State Library. With the fusion of the states of Guanabara and Rio de Janeiro in 1975, the Public Archive went back under the control of the Secretary.of Justice. In 1979, the President of the Province and President of the State of Rio de Janeiro collections were returned to the institution.

By 1985, the functions and patrimony of the General Department of Documentation (also part of the Secretary of Justice) were incorporated into the APERJ. A library specializing in legislation and law was also included in the APERJ. The directorship, as well as the research and accessible legislation sectors, remained in Rio de Janeiro with the sectors responsible for technical processing and archive usage remaining in Niterói.

The Public Archive installed itself in the building once belonging to the Auditors Court in Niterói in 1989 and, once there, united all of its activities with the institution and remained at the address for seven years. Since then, the APERJ continued to intensified the collection of documents produced by the public administration of the state. Since then, the APERJ increased its collection of documents produced by the Public Administration of the State, which featured the archives of the Political Police of Rio de Janeiro, the Candido Mendes Penal Institute in Ilha Grande, and the State Program for the Protection and Orientation of the Consumer in the State of Rio de Janeiro (PROCON/RJ).

In 1995, the APERJ was transferred from Niterói to a building on the property of the State Water and Gas Company of Rio Janeiro (CEDAE), on Rua Riachuelo in Rio de Janeiro. This building proved unsuited for the needs of the archive and it was moved shortly after. Three years later, in 1998, another move brought the archive to the Praia de Botafogo, n.480, in Rio de Janeiro, where it is located today.

=== Building closure due to neglect ===
On 6 January 2025, APERJ's director, Victor Travancas, announced to the press the closing of the institution's building in Botafogo due to "imminent risk of collapse and fire". Much of the archive's collection is digitized, but not available online or to the public; instead, the files sit on hard drives inside the building. Travancas had additionally identified 26 ghost employees, constituting about 70% of the institution's workforce, and had reported that to the Prosecutor's Office of Rio de Janeiro.

Two days later, on 8 January, the governor of Rio de Janeiro, Cláudio Castro, fired Travancas and most of the archive's employees without notice, and ordered it to be reopened. On that same day, Travancas had invited the press to visit the building to report on the "critical" condition it was in. During their visit, 3 police cars showed up. Castro's government later told reporters that the building was in condition to function, and that its closure was a unilateral decision by the former director, though it denied requests from other press outlets to visit and inspect the building.

== Collections ==
The archive contains documents of diverse themes and types, including: texts, audiovisual sources, maps, books, electronics, images, and other objects relevant to the study of the history of Rio de Janeiro state in the second half of the eighteenth century. These are original documents from the Executive powers of the State of Rio de Janeiro and private archives. The materials contained in the APERJ cover a broad range of themes, including: agriculture, diplomacy, political campaigns, Communism, crime and punishment, education, slavery, espionage, indigenous peoples, industry and commerce, the military, social movements, public works, the police, health, land ownership, transportation, and taxes.

The most commonly requested documents for research are contained in the Political Police of Rio de Janeiro (Polícias Políticas do Rio de Janeiro- POL) collection, the Special Delegation on Political Security (Delegacia Especial de Segurança Política e Social-DESPS) collection, the Autonomous Department for the Political and Social Order of the State (Departamento Autônomo de Ordem Política e Social do Estado do Rio de Janeiro- DOPS/RJ) collection, the Department of the Political and Social Order of the State of Guanabara (Departamento de Ordem Política e Social do Estado da Guanabara-DOPS/GB) collection, the Division of the Political and Social Police (Divisão de Polícia Política e Social-DPS) collection, the President of the Province (Presidência da Província- PP) collection, the President of the State (Presidência do Estado- PE) collection, the Department of Education (Departamento de Educação) collection, the House of Detention (Casa de Detenção) collection, the Conselho Ultramarino collection, the Feminist Movement for Democratic Liberties (Movimento Feminino lela Anistia e Liberdades Democráticas-MFALD) collection, and the Secretary Governor of the State of Rio de Janeiro (Secretaria de Governo do Estado do Rio de Janeiro) collection. In addition, the APERJ possesses private collections related to the general interests of the institution, such as the: Ângela Borba, Daniel Aarão Reis Filho, Jair Ferreira de Sá Jean Marc von der Weid, Silas Ayres de Mattos, Robespierre Martins Teixeira, and Vera Silvia de Magalhães collections.

== Locations ==
Since its creation in 1931, the archive was in several different locations. Initially, it was on Rua Doutor Celestino n.1 in Niteroi. At the time, it shared a building with the State Library (Biblioteca Estadual de Niteroi). After 1985, the directorship, research and legislation divisions were moved to Rio de Janeiro and moved into the building of the extinct General Department of Documentation (Departamento Geral de Documentação-DGD). The departments responsible for the technical processing and consultation of archival materials remained in Niteroi. In 1989, the APERJ left the building it shared with the DGD and established itself on the Avenida Erasmo Braga in Rio de Janeiro. The Administrative Secretary moved into the old State Treasury building (Tribunal de Contas do Estado) on the Rua Jansen de Melo in Niterói. The institution eventually united all of its parts and installed itself in the old CEDAE building in 1995 on the Rua Riachuelo in Rio de Janeiro. Finally, in 1998, the APERJ was transferred to a building on the Praia de Botafogo in Rio de Janeiro, where it is still located today.
