= Museu do Índio =

Museum in Rio de Janeiro, Brazil

Coordinates: 22°57′07″S 43°11′28″W

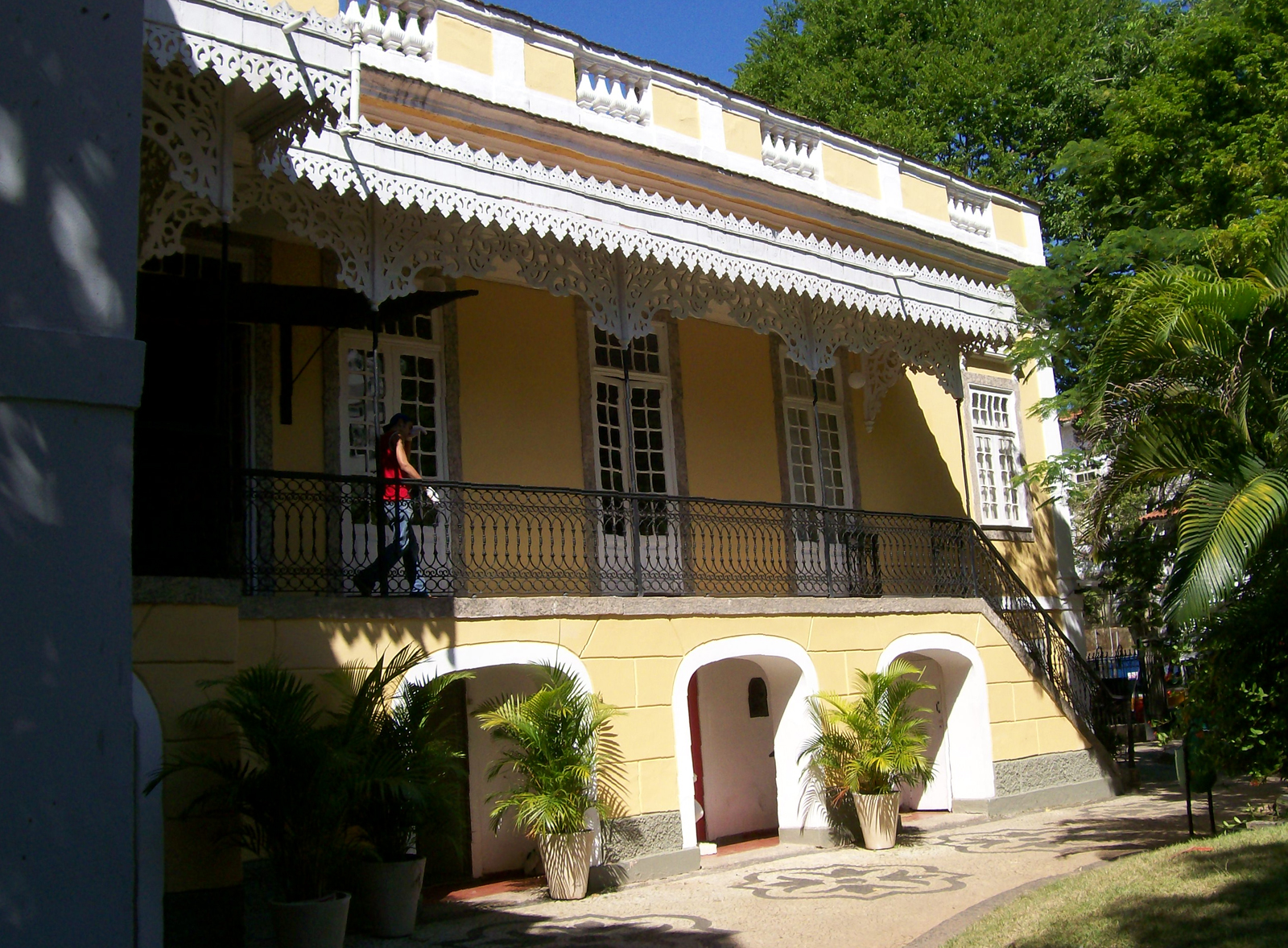
Museu do Índio, Botafogo, Rio de Janeiro, Brazil

O Museu do Índio (English: The Museum of the Indigenous Populations) is a cultural and scientific agency of the Fundação Nacional dos Povos Indígenas (English: National Foundation of Indigenous Populations) or FUNAI. It was created by Darcy Ribeiro, in the city of Rio de Janeiro, Brazil in 1953. As the only official institution in Brazil exclusively dedicated to indigenous cultures (the people known as povos indígenas in Portuguese), the museum has the objective of promoting an accurate and updated image for the indigenous cause, while avoiding common misconceptions and prejudice of these societies.

== Collections ==
The rich collection of the museum, which includes most of the present-day indigenous societies, is composed of 14,000 ethnography parts. In the Marechal Rondon Library, 16,000 national and foreign publications specialized in ethnology and other related areas, plus 50,000 images in diverse environments, including 3,000 digital photographs on CD-ROM, about 200 films, videos, and sound recordings, as well as 500,000 documents of historical value relating to various indigenous groups and their political situation in Brazil from the end of 19th century to the present.

In the eleven rooms of the main building, the Museu do Índio organizes the temporary showing of samples of paintings and photos using the collection stored in its archives. In the gardens of the institution, there are five different environments, including a Guarani fazenda, a Xingu kitchen and ritual house for the Xingu Quarup (also spelled "Kuarup").

== History ==
In 1978, the museum was moved to an old mansion built in the era of the 1880s, in the Botafogo district. It had been originally constructed by João Rodrigues Teixeira, an entrepreneur involved in the food industry of Rio de Janeiro. Constructed by Teixeita as his family residence, the mansion house is registered by the Instituto do Patrimônio Histórico e Artístico Nacional or IPHAN (English: National Institute of Historic and Artistic Sites). The architectural style of its construction is quite representative of this period of urban growth.

In March 2013, police stormed the site of the previous museum building that once housed Brazil’s first Indian Museum. The objective was to end a standoff with more than 20 indigenous protesters who had squatted for years in an adjacent structure.

== Museum of the Indian Friends Society ==
Statue of Indian mother and child

Sociedade Amigos do Museu do Índio (SAMI) is a nonprofit organization with the objective of bringing the museum together with the public. SAMI develops projects that originate from the Brazilian indigenous cultures. It makes acquisitions of artifacts and collections, with the intention of preserving the culture of indigenous traditions. It promotes educational courses, seminaries, and other social and cultural events. Individuals and corporations that propose to help the society can be an associate in one of three categories: partner, contributor, or child benefactor. SAMI also accepts new memberships, as well as ideas, suggestions, and volunteers that will increase and ensure support for the scientific and cultural activities of the museum. This includes disseminating an accurate, current image of indigenous peoples without preconceptions.

== Controversy with Lille Natural History Museum ==
In 2003, a large exhibit of Brazilian native artifacts was planned in the city of Lille as part of the Celebrations of the Year of Brazil in France, which would take place in 2005. 611 objects were to be displayed in France. In order to allow the objects to legally leave the country, given their condition as heritage, Lille Natural History Museum bought the objects, immediately donating them to the Museu do Índio, thus securing the right to loan the objects for five years, renewable for another five years. In 2009, having received no notice that there was an intent to renew the loan, the Museu do Indio asked for its restitution. Representatives of the Lille Natural History Museum refused to do so, alleging that the objects were now part of the heritage of the city of Lille. The objects were not displayed in the Museum after 2009.

After a legal battle that lasted over a decade, the objects were set to be returned in 2023. The Brazilian government agreed to pay for the transportation costs, which, according to the original contract, should have been paid by the French Museum.

Historian Juarez da Silva has criticised Lille Natural History Museum as having a colonialist mentality, saying that they are holding to "ideas that such objects cannot be preserved and valued in their own countries" and that the cultural heritage of countries deemed as "exotic" is still very much seen as "up for grabs".

== Indian Art Store (Loja Artíndia) ==
The Loja Artíndia of the museum is one of the seven Artíndia Stores of FUNAI, which are maintained by the Artíndia Program. In these stores, arts and crafts acquired directly from the indigenous communities are sold. This guarantees these communities a source of revenue and stimulates them to maintain their standard of culture. In addition, the store sells thematic books, T-shirts, CDs, and CD-ROMs.

== Location and hours ==
The museum is located at Rua das Palmeiras, 55, in the district of Botafogo, Rio de Janeiro, Brazil. There is no parking for visitors, as this is reserved for employees, SAMI members, volunteers, and maintenance. Hours are Tuesday to Friday, 9:00 am to 5:30 pm (closed Mondays except for school groups); Saturdays, Sundays, and holidays from 1 pm to 5 pm (exhibit areas and art store only, as the library and other research areas are closed on weekends).
