= Maracanã, Rio de Janeiro =

Maracanã
- Neighborhood
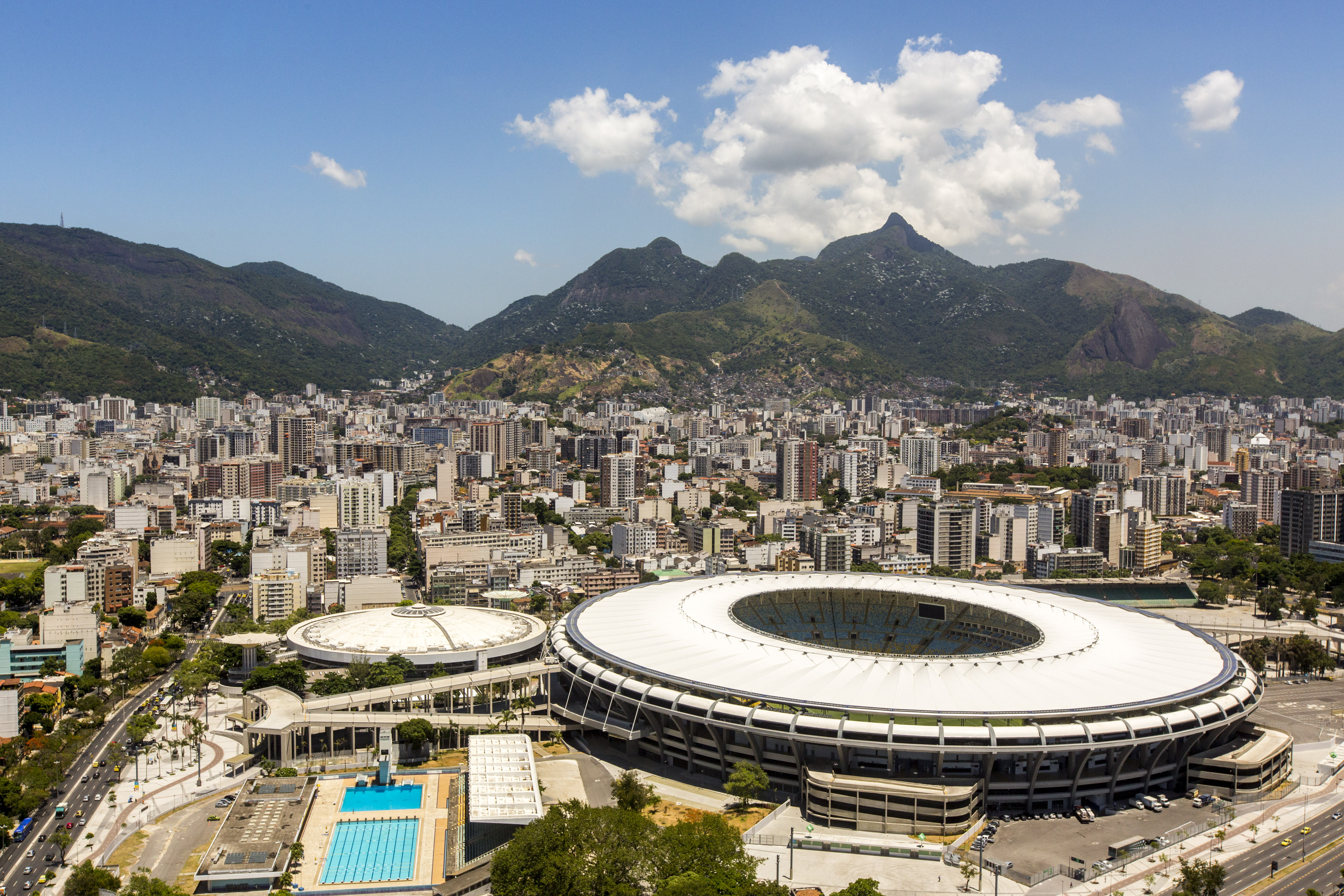

- Location in Rio de Janeiro Maracanã (Brazil)
- Coordinates: 22°54′50″S 43°13′38″W
- Country: Brazil
- State: Rio de Janeiro (RJ)
- Municipality/City: Rio de Janeiro
- Zone: North Zone

Area
  - Total: 166.73 ha (412.0 acres)

Population (2010)
  - Total: 25,256
  - Density: 15,148/km^{2} (39,233/sq mi)

Maracanã (Brazilian Portuguese: [maɾakɐˈnɐ̃], which in Tupi–Guarani means green bird) is a middle-class neighborhood in the Northern Zone of Rio de Janeiro city. The Maracanã Stadium is located in this neighborhood, as well as the Ginásio do Maracanãzinho. Maracanã is bordered by these neighborhoods: Praça da Bandeira, Tijuca and Vila Isabel.

The population of the neighborhood is estimated at 25,256 according to the 2010 census.

The neighborhood has a long sporting tradition. Besides Maracanã stadium, there is also a derby club that was built in 1885 by André Gustavo Paulo de Frontin. Also, there is a bikeway, Espaço Mané Garrincha, named after the footballer Garrincha. It is 1,700 metres (5,600 ft) long, and surrounds the Maracanã stadium.

The UERJ, which is one of the main universities in Rio de Janeiro, is also located in Maracanã. Other education institutions are the CEFET and the Escola Politécnica, both technical colleges which prepare high school students for the labour market. Two schools, Pedro II and Colégio Militar, are located at São Francisco Xavier street.

The neighborhood is crossed by its main avenue, called Maracanã Avenue, which connects Maracanã to Tijuca. Another important avenue is Presidente Castelo Branco Avenue. São Francisco Xavier street is the main street and crosses Maracanã Avenue.

Maracanã also contains Maracanã Village, an old museum building that housed indigenous people. These people were evicted by the government in 2013.

The neighborhood was one of the four "Olympic Zones" during the 2016 Summer Olympics with Maracanã Stadium as the host.
