= Federal University of Science and Innovation of Rio de Janeiro =

Educational institution in Brazil

- Universidade Federal de Ciência e Inovação do Rio de Janeiro
- Former names: Escola Técnica Nacional; Escola Normal de Artes e Ofícios Wenceslau Brás; Centro Federal de Educação Tecnológica Celso Suckow da Fonseca; Centro Federal de Educação Tecnológica do Rio de Janeiro
- Motto: Um olhar para o futuro: Universidade Tecnológica Federal do Rio de Janeiro
- Motto in English: A look to the future: Federal Technological University of Rio de Janeiro
- Type: Public university system, Federal
- Established: 1917
- Affiliations: Ministry of Education
- Endowment: 321.044.301,00 (Treasure Union in 2016)
- Chancellor: Carlos Henrique Figueiredo Alves
- Vice-Chancellor: Mauricio Motta
- Students: 10 523
- Location: Rio de Janeiro, Rio de Janeiro (state), Brazil; 22°54′44″S 43°13′28″W
- Campus: 8 campuses: Maracanã, Maria da Graça, Nova Iguaçu, Valença, Petrópolis, Itaguaí, Angra dos Reis and Nova Friburgo
- Colors: Blue, White and Gray (yellow occasionally)
- Website: cefet-rj.br

The Federal University of Science and Innovation of Rio de Janeiro (Portuguese: Universidade Federal de Ciência e Inovação do Rio de Janeiro, UFCIRJ, previously Federal Center for Technological Education Celso Suckow da Fonseca, or Federal Center for Technological Education of Rio de Janeiro (Portuguese: Centro Federal de Educação Tecnológica Celso Suckow da Fonseca or Centro Federal de Educação Tecnológica do Rio de Janeiro, CEFET/RJ), is one of the most traditional Brazilian federal educational institution subordinated to the Brazilian Ministry of Education. It offers undergraduate and post-graduate level courses in addition to its sought-after technical high school courses. The school's education is focused in the engineering fields of mechanics, information technology, electronics, telecommunication, metallurgy, petrochemical and electrical. Its multicampus headquarters is in Maracanã with an additional campus in the Rio de Janeiro suburb of Maria da Graça, and several other campuses in different cities of the state of Rio de Janeiro, such as Petrópolis, Nova Friburgo and Nova Iguaçu.

== History ==
In Brazil, the Federal Centers for Technological Education reflect the evolution of a type of educational institution that, in the 20th century, accompanied and helped develop the country's industrialization process. The history of these centers is, therefore, linked to the origins of vocational education, which, on a national scale, dates back to 1909 when President Nilo Peçanha decreed the creation of Apprentice Craftsmen Schools in the state capitals to provide primary and free vocational education.

Located in Rio de Janeiro, a city that was the capital of the Republic until 1960, the institution now known as UFCI/RJ had this vocation defined since 1917 when the Normal School of Arts and Crafts Wenceslau Braz was created by the city government of the then Federal District. It was given the responsibility of training teachers, masters, and foremen for vocational education. Having passed to federal government jurisdiction in 1919, and being restructured in 1937 when the structure of the then Ministry of Education was revised, this Normal School was transformed into a lyceum for vocational education of all branches and levels, similar to the aforementioned Apprentice Craftsmen Schools, which were maintained by the Union.

In that year of 1937, the plan to build the vocational lyceum that would replace the Normal School of Arts and Crafts was approved. However, before the lyceum was inaugurated, its name was changed to National Technical School, in line with the spirit of the Organic Law of Industrial Education, promulgated on January 30, 1942. This school – established by Decree-Law No. 4,127 of February 25, 1942, which laid the foundations for the organization of the federal network of industrial education institutions – was responsible for offering first cycle courses (industrial and mastery) and second cycle courses (technical and pedagogical).

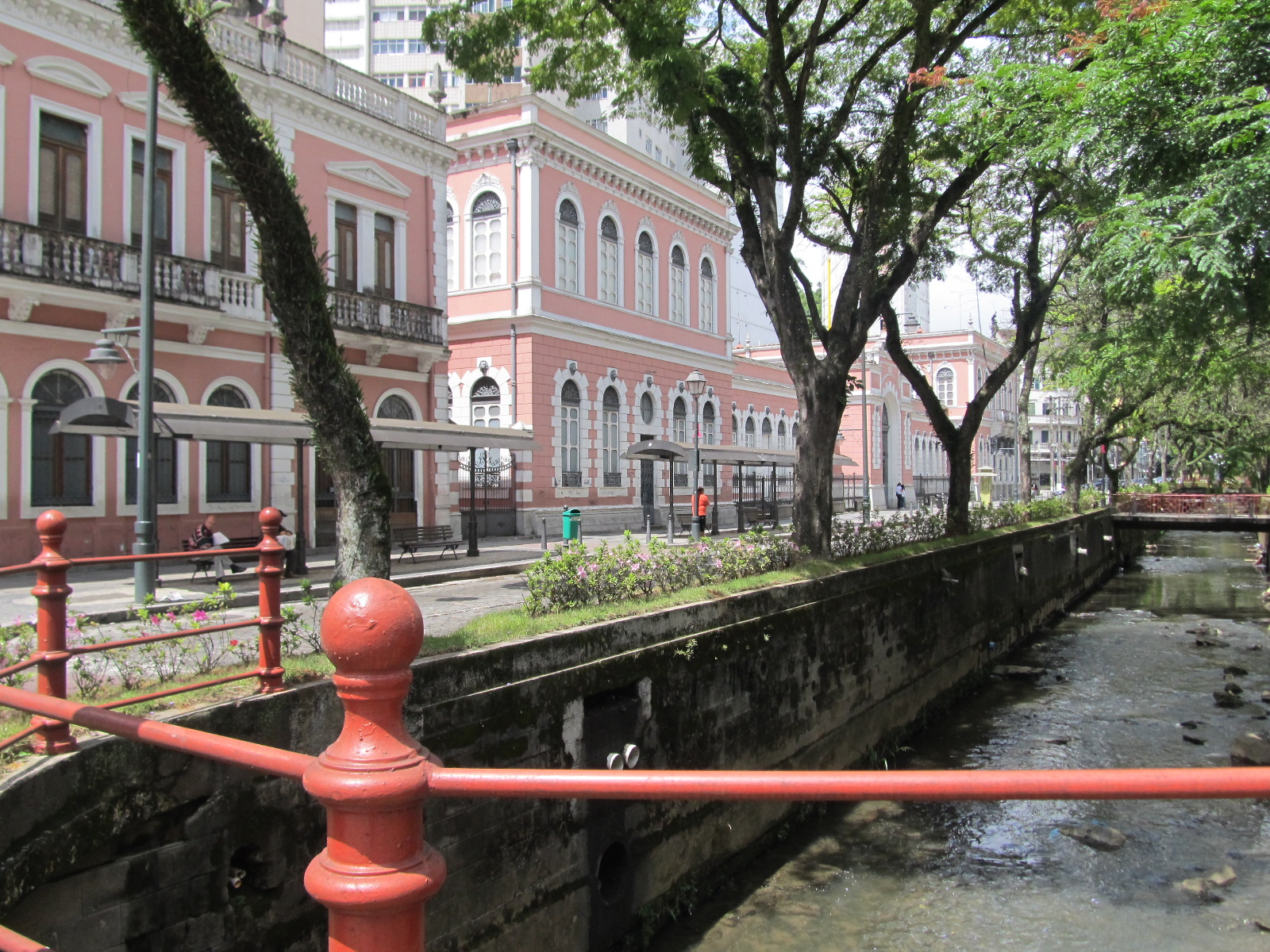
UFCI/RJ campus in Petrópolis

The Decree No. 47,038 of October 16, 1959, brought greater administrative autonomy to the National Technical School, gradually phasing out first cycle courses and focusing exclusively on training technicians. In 1966, Operation Engineering courses were introduced, thus providing training for industry professionals in short-duration higher education courses. These courses were conducted in cooperation with the Federal University of Rio de Janeiro (UFRJ) for faculty collaboration and diploma issuance purposes. The need to prepare teachers for specific subjects in technical courses and Operation Engineering courses led to the creation of the Teacher Training Center in 1971, in collaboration with the Training Center of the State of Guanabara (CETEG) and the National Center for Professional Training (CENAFOR).

It is this school that, having received other designations in its trajectory – Federal Technical School of Guanabara (in 1965, to align with the state's name) and Federal Technical School Celso Suckow da Fonseca (in 1967, as a posthumous tribute to the first director chosen from a shortlist based on faculty votes) – was transformed into a Federal Center for Technological Education by Law No. 6,545 of June 30, 1978.

On September 24, 2026, President Lula signed the law transforming the Federal Center for Technological Education of Rio de Janeiro (Cefet-RJ) into the Federal University of Science and Innovation of Rio de Janeiro (UFCI/RJ).

Since that date, the Federal Center for Technological Education of Rio de Janeiro (UFCI/RJ), in the spirit of the law that created it, has been given objectives assigned to higher education institutions, acting as a special regime autarchy linked to the Ministry of Education and Culture – possessing administrative, patrimonial, financial, didactic, and disciplinary autonomy – in offering undergraduate and postgraduate courses, in extension activities, and conducting research in the technological area.

Bringing with it the social recognition of the old technical school, UFCI/RJ has expanded academically and physically. Today, the institution has a headquarters unit – in the Maracanã neighborhood – and seven decentralized units (Uneds) – one in Maria da Graça, also in Rio de Janeiro, and others in the municipalities of Nova Iguaçu, Petrópolis, Nova Friburgo, Itaguaí, Valença, and Angra dos Reis. Its educational activities include regular offerings of high school and technical vocational education courses, undergraduate courses (technology and bachelor's degrees), master's and doctoral programs, as well as research and extension activities, including lato sensu postgraduate courses, among others.

The UFCI/RJ challenges itself to contribute to the development of the state of Rio de Janeiro and the region. Attentive to the country's Industrial, Technological, and Foreign Trade Policy Guidelines, it is oriented towards professional training that meets the needs of innovation and technological development, industrial modernization, and the enhancement of the capacity and productive scale of companies established here, external insertion, and strategic investment options in future-oriented activities – without losing sight of the social dimension of development. Thus, it reaffirms itself as a public institution that aims to continue training professionals for the metalworking, petrochemical, electric power, electronics, telecommunications, information technology, and other sectors that make up the production of goods and services in the country.

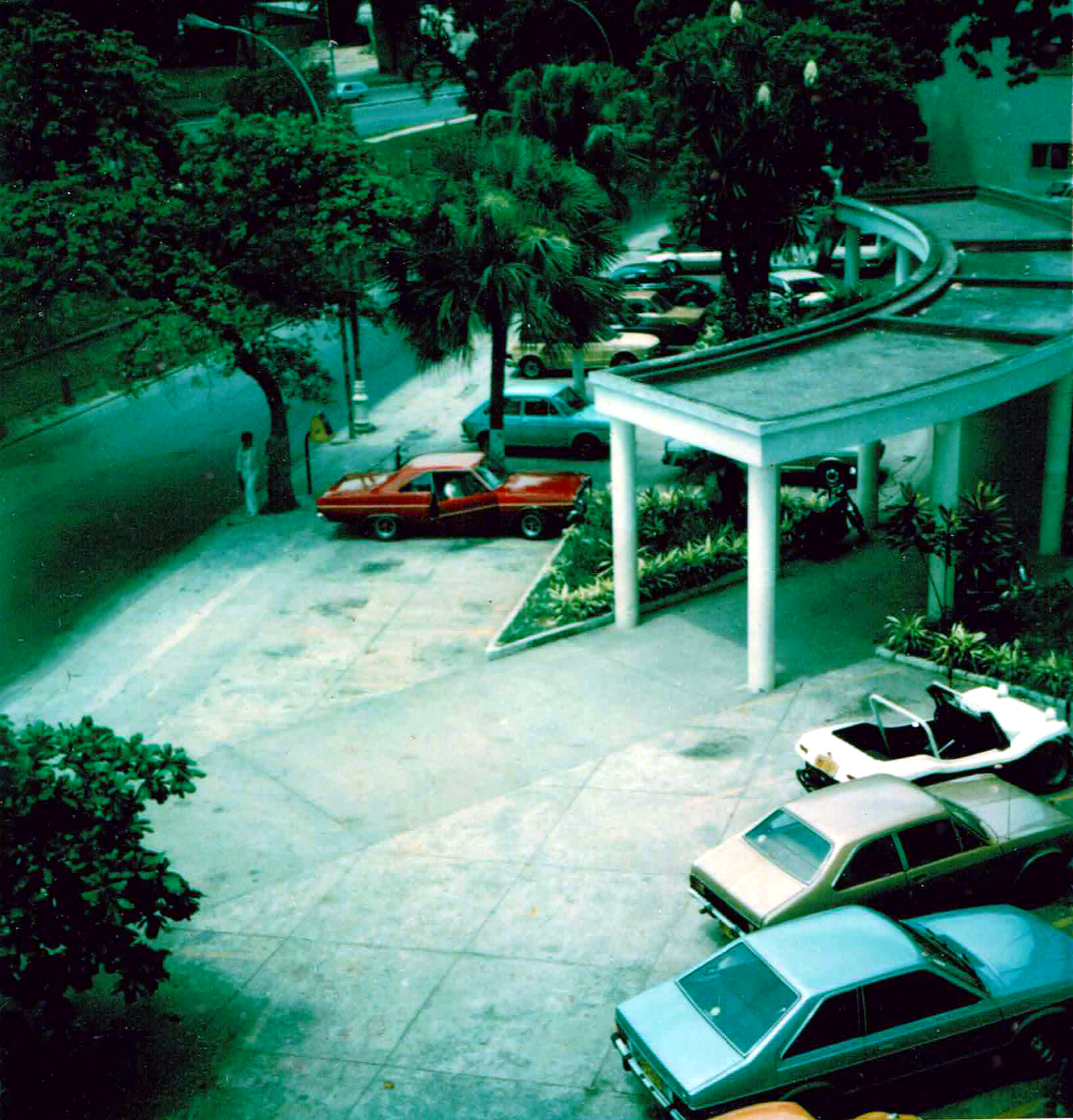
CEFET RJ Front Entrance (Maracanã Ave) Circa 1979 – Taken with a Polaroid Instant Camera by R.Santos

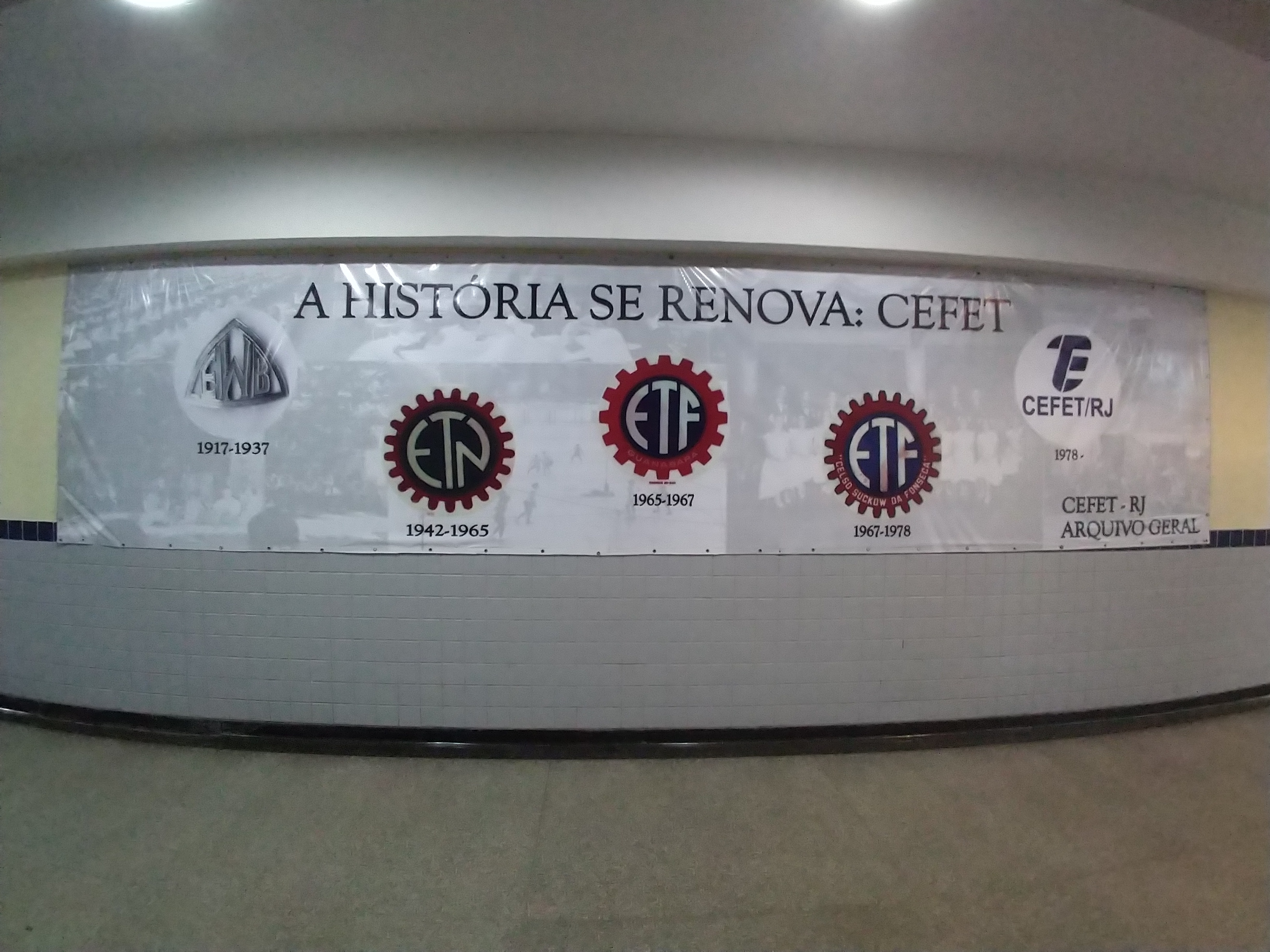
The former and current logos of the institution

The school was also known as:

- Escola Tecnica Nacional, Escola Tecnica Federal da Guanabara (1965)
- Escola Tecnica Federal Celso Suckow da Fonseca (in 1967, as a posthumous homage to its first director)
- Centro Federal de Educação Tecnológica Celso Suckow da Fonseca (1978)

== Academics ==
=== Technical Courses ===
- Electrical
- Electronics
- Control and Automation
- Telecommunications
- Mechanics
- Metrology
- Automotive Maintenance
- Buildings
- Ports
- Roads
- Computing
- Administration
- Workplace safety
- Tourism
- Environment
- Nursing
- Chemistry
- Foods
- Meteorology

=== Undergraduate Courses ===
As of 2020, it is offered 20 undergraduate courses.

- Computer Science
- Information Systems
- Computer Engineering
- Internet Services Technology
- Physics
- Civil Engineering
- Electrical Engineering
- Electronic Engineering
- Environmental Engineering
- Metallurgical Engineering
- Control Engineering
- Telecommunications Engineering
- Mechanical Engineering
- Production Engineering
- Food Engineering
- Administration
- Workplace safety
- Tourism Management
- Environmental Management
- Applied Foreign Languages for International Negotiations

=== Post-Graduation Courses ===
There are 15 post-graduation courses, being 7 lato sensu (specialization) and 8 stricto sensu (master's and doctor's degrees).

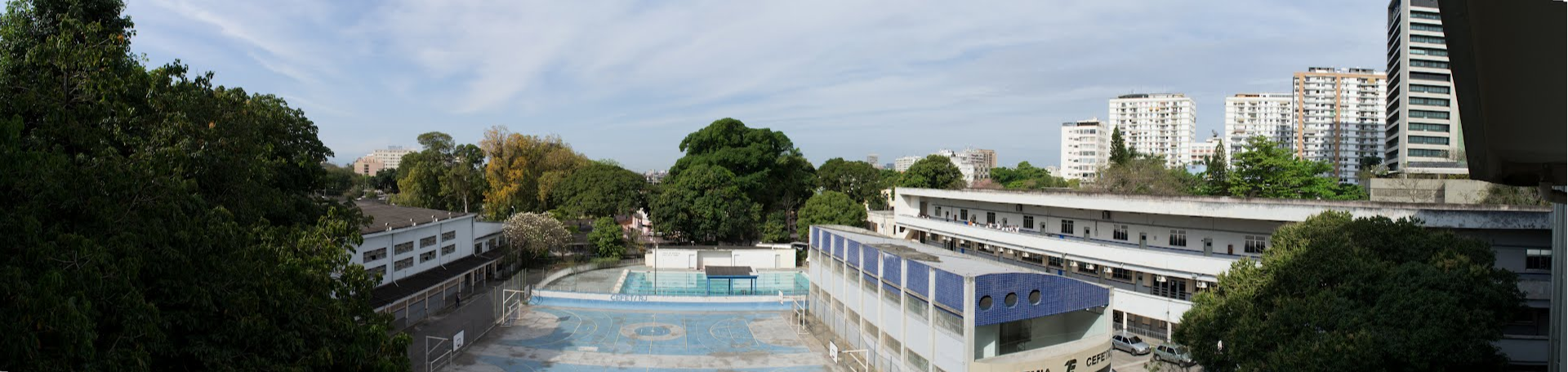
Panoramic View

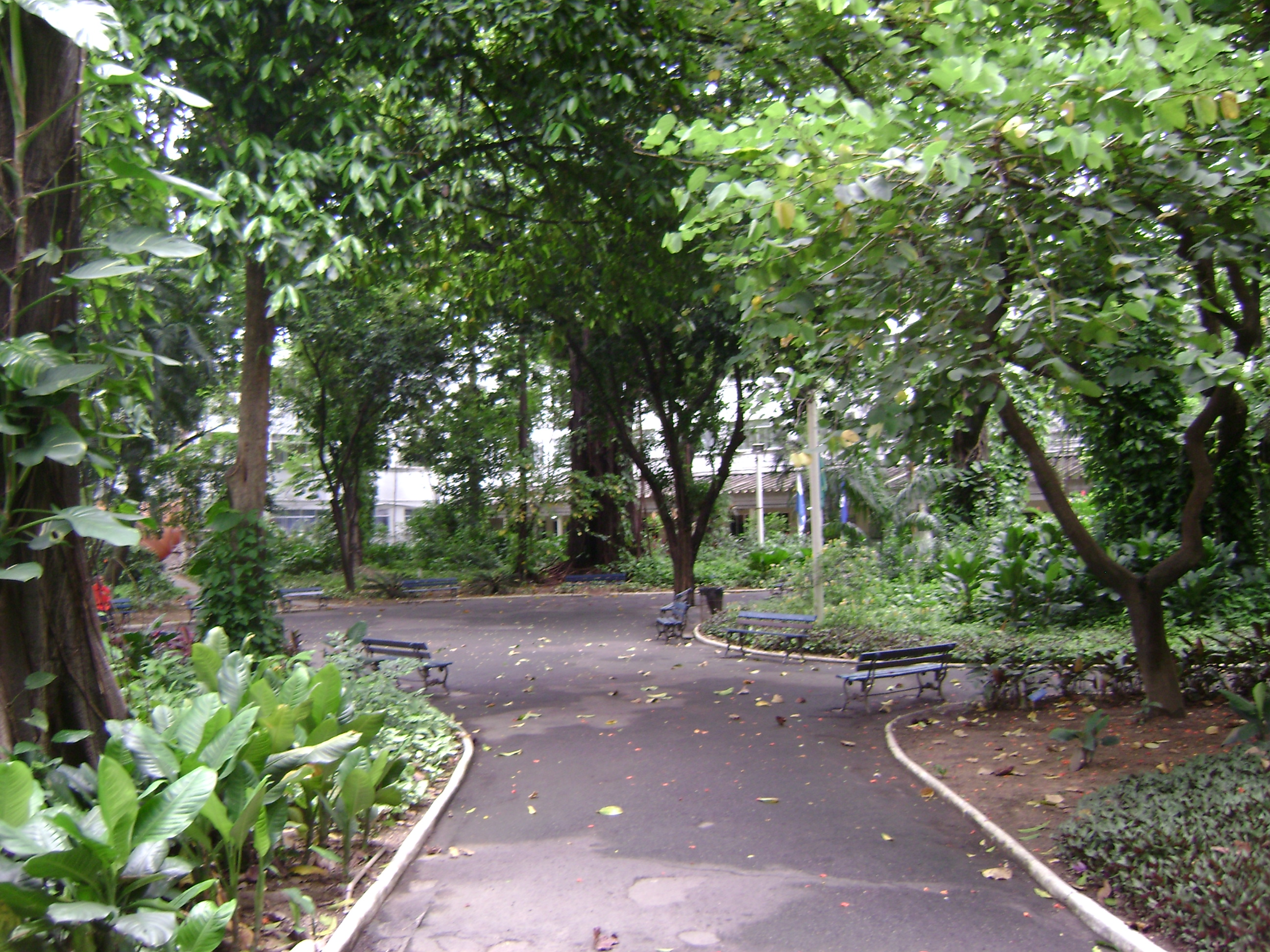
The current trees inside the campus Maracanã used to be an extension of the Imperial Garden of Quinta da Boa Vista

== Campi ==
The UFCI/RJ have 8 campi in 7 different cities in the Rio de Janeiro State.

- Maracanã, the main campus, bases in the neighborhood of Maracanã, in Rio de Janeiro City
- Maria da Graça, the second campus in the Rio de Janeiro City, in the Maria da Graça neighborhood.
- Angra dos Reis, in the city with the same name.
- Itaguaí, in the city with the same name.
- Nova Friburgo, in the city with the same name.
- Nova Iguaçu, in the city with the same name.
- Petrópolis, in the city with the same name.
- Valença, in the city with the same name.

== See also ==
- CEFET
- IFET
