= State University of Northern Rio de Janeiro =

Public university in Brazil

- Universidade Estadual do Norte Fluminense "Darcy Ribeiro"
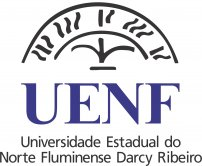
- Other name: UENF
- Established: February 27, 1991
- Location: Campos dos Goytacazes, Rio de Janeiro, Brazil
- Website: www.uenf.br

The State University of Northern Rio de Janeiro (Portuguese: Universidade Estadual do Norte Fluminense "Darcy Ribeiro", UENF) is a public university located in the city of Campos dos Goytacazes in the State of Rio de Janeiro. The university was planned by anthropologist Professor Darcy Ribeiro. The university was designed mainly by the renowned architecture Oscar Niemeyer. It was established on February 27, 1991.

== See also ==
- List of state universities in Brazil
