= Deutsche Schule Rio de Janeiro =

Coordinates: 22.9502°S 43.1951°W

- Portuguese: Escola Alemã Corcovado
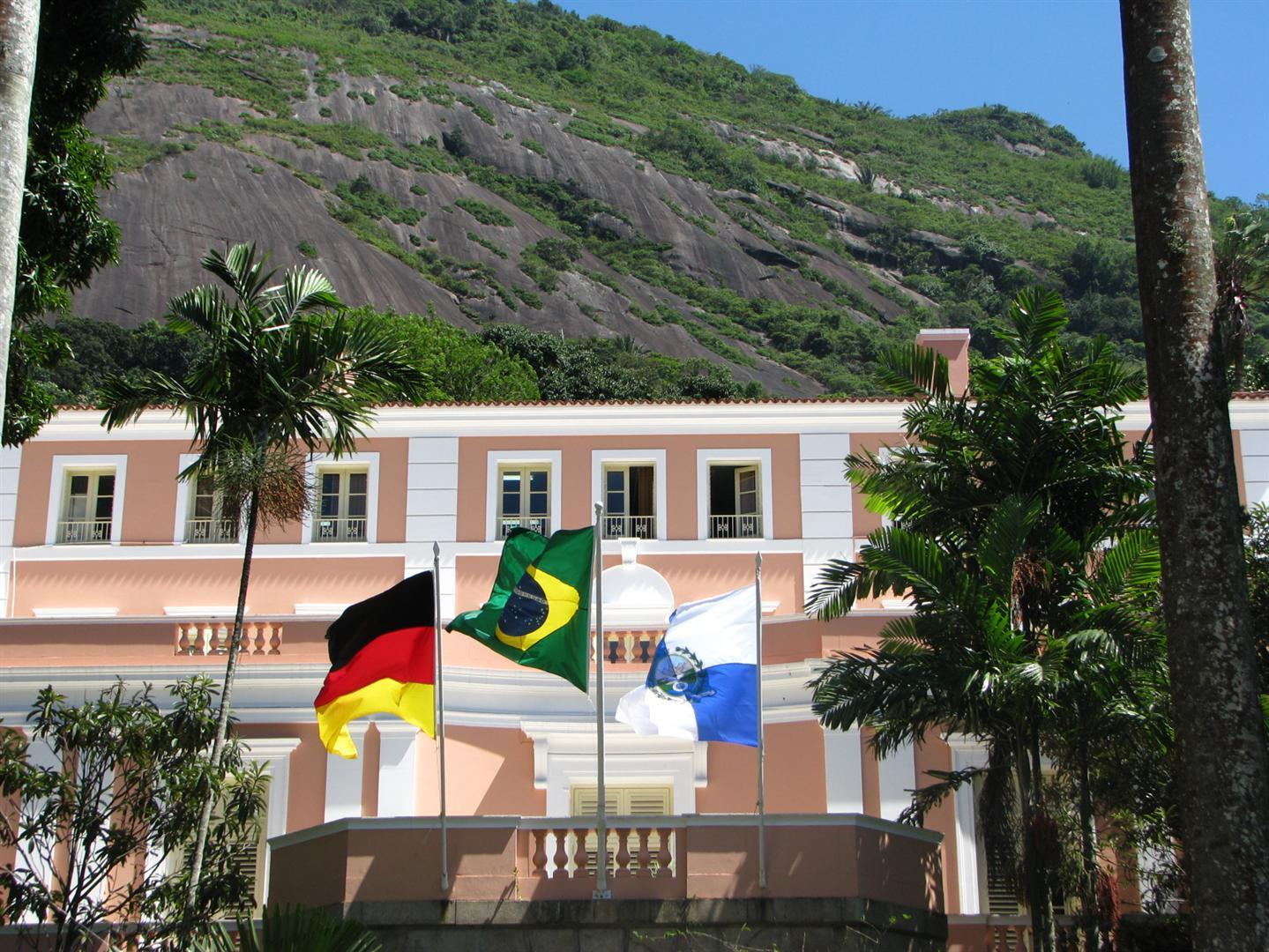
- Botafogo, Rio de Janeiro; Brazil

Information
- Established: 1965; 61 years ago
- Founder: Helle Tirler
- Language: German; Portuguese

Deutsche Schule Rio de Janeiro (Portuguese: Escola Alemã Corcovado) is a German international school in Botafogo, Rio de Janeiro, Brazil. It serves levels Kindergarten/Educação Infantil through klasse 12/turma 12 (a part of Sekundarstufe II, or senior high school/sixth form). It is located in the former US Embassy.

There are two divisions: a German division and a Brazilian division. The German division, used by Brazilians already speaking German and German expatriates, has about two-thirds of its classes taught in German. In the Brazilian division about one third of the classes are taught in German. The German government gives support and 15 teachers from Germany are a part of the faculty.

The school was founded by Helle Tirler, in 1965.

As of 2014 the monthly tuition was 2,000 Brazilian real.

== See also ==
- German Brazilian
