= Botafogo =

- Neighborhood
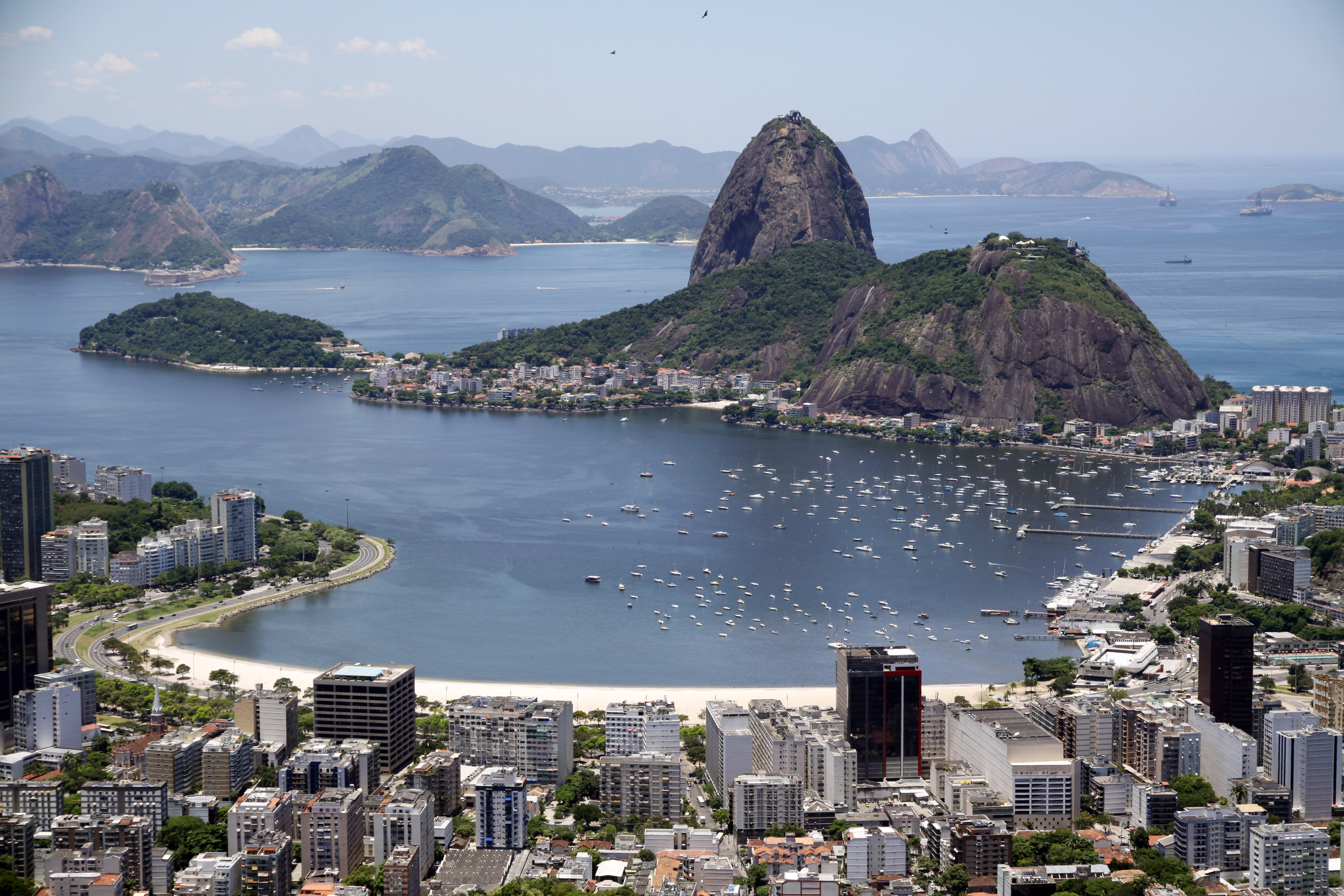

- Location in Rio de Janeiro Botafogo (Brazil)
- Coordinates: 22°57′0″S 43°11′3″W
- Country: Brazil
- State: Rio de Janeiro (RJ)
- Municipality/City: Rio de Janeiro
- Zone: South Zone
- Administrative Region: Botafogo

Area
  - Total: 4.8 km^{2} (1.9 sq mi)

Population (2010)
  - Total: 82,890
  - Density: 17,000/km^{2} (45,000/sq mi)

Botafogo (local/standard Portuguese pronunciation: [bɔtaˈfoɡu] alternative Brazilian Portuguese pronunciation: [botɐˈfoɡu]) is a beachfront neighborhood (bairro) in Rio de Janeiro, Brazil. It is a mostly upper middle class and small commerce community, and is located between the hills of Mundo Novo, Dona Marta (which separates it from Laranjeiras) and São João (which separates it from Copacabana). The word Botafogo also refers to a Latin American ballroom dance move that originated in this area.

== Etymology ==
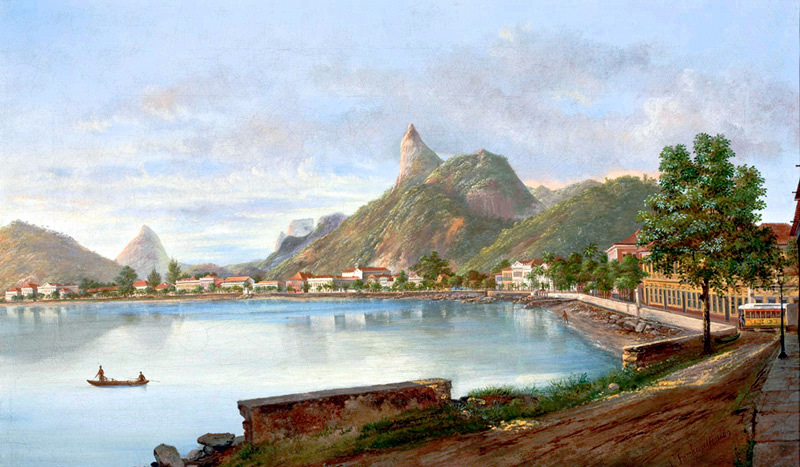
"Botafogo Bay" (1869), by Nicolao Antonio Facchinetti. Collection of the São Paulo Museum of Art.

Botafogo was named after João Pereira de Sousa Botafogo (1540–1627), who was responsible for the galleon Botafogo's artillery. Because of that, he received the nickname "Botafogo" and included it in his family name. When he went to live in Brazil, the Portuguese Crown granted him the land known today as Botafogo. The name literally means "set it on fire" in Portuguese (a reference to the Botafogo galleon's artillery power). In the mid-19th century, English language speakers also called it Boto Fogo.

== History ==
The neighborhood dates back to 1702, when the process of distributing lands began with the establishment of three large farms on the outskirts of newly-minted Rio. By 1808, the city's elite had begun to build mansions in the parish of Botafogo, giving rise to a small collective of nobles, merchants, and court officials. By 1820 several roads through the swampy area had been established that remain to this day, including Rua Marquês de Abrantes, São Clemente, Rua da Passagem, Rua General Polidoro, and the eponymous Praia de Botafogo. With the establishment of a ferry and animal-drawn trams in the 1867 and 1871 respectively, the neighborhood began expanding inland and becoming more dense alongside the introduction of amenities like running water and gas lighting.

In 1903 the last of the original farmland was turned over to build a new home for St. Ignatius School as Botafogo completed its transformation from elite hideaway to mostly-middleclass stronghold. In this time the construction of the New and Old Tunnels also marked a new chapter in the city's expansion, as Botafogo became the connective tissue between the old city center and new developments in Ipanema and Copacabana.

== Attractions and amenities ==
Botafogo's beach is within Guanabara Bay, sheltered from the Atlantic Ocean by the Urca peninsula and Sugarloaf Mountain. Attractions include the Home of Ruy Barbosa, the Museu do Índio—which explores the culture and history of the major indigenous peoples of Brazil—and the Villa-Lobos Museum. The Public Archive for the State of Rio de Janeiro (APERJ) is also located in Botafogo. Another iconic construction in Botafogo was the Pavilhão Mourisco, built in 1907 in an Arab style on Praia de Botafogo. It featured five golden domes, resembling the Al Askari Mosque in Iraq, and an interior with marble staircases and Arabic inscriptions. Originally a music hall, it later thrived as a restaurant-bar, especially at night when fully illuminated.

Demolished in 1952, the site was later occupied by the Clube de Regatas Botafogo. In the early 21st century, it was replaced by the Centro Empresarial Mourisco, a modern glass office building.

== Sports ==
Botafogo is the home of Botafogo de Futebol e Regatas, a multi-sport club whose football team is one of Brazil's biggest.

== Infrastructure ==
The neighborhood is served by Botafogo Station on the Rio de Janeiro Metro.

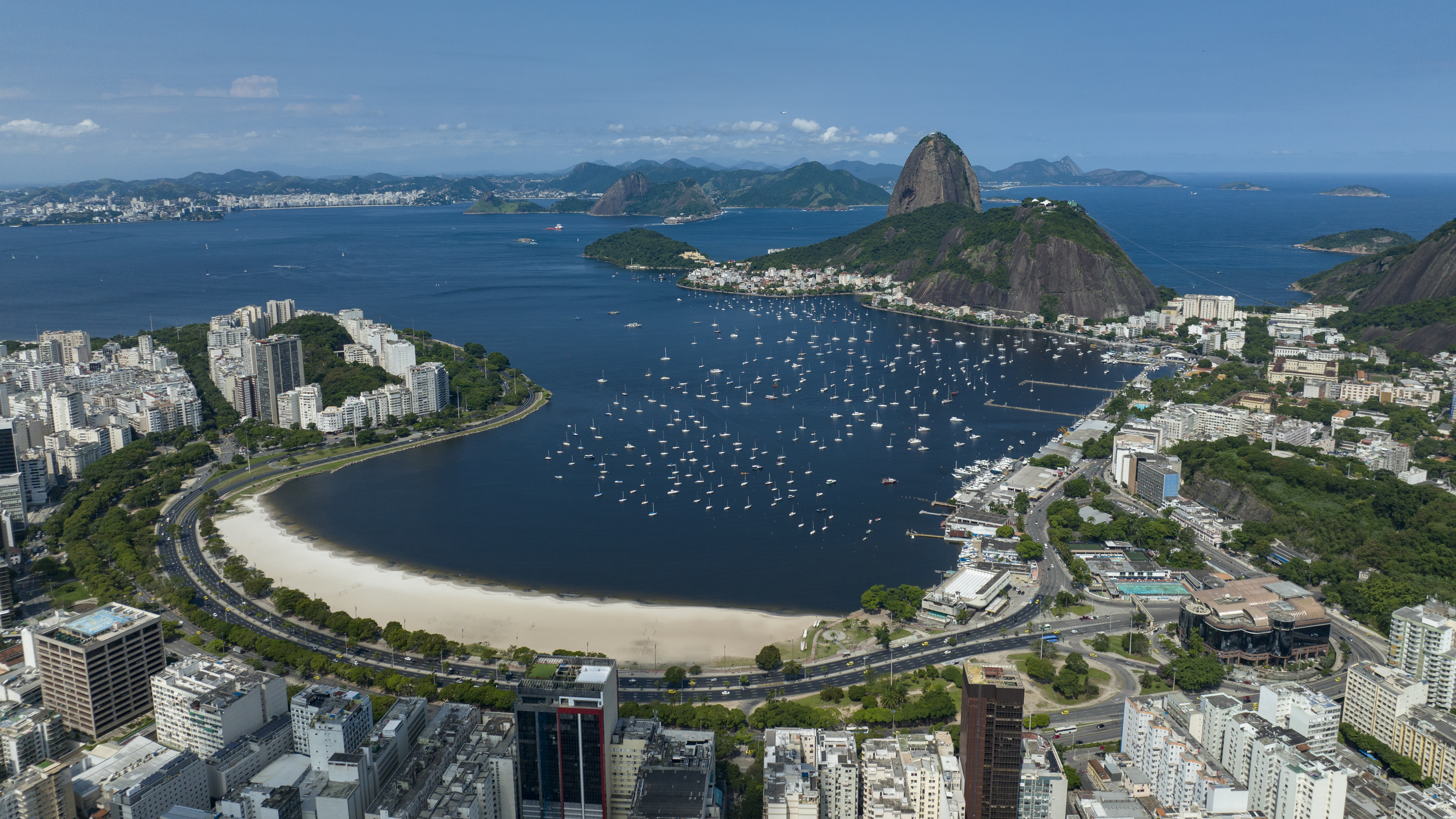
Panoramic view of Botafogo beach with the Sugarloaf Mountain and Morro da Urca in the background.

== Education ==
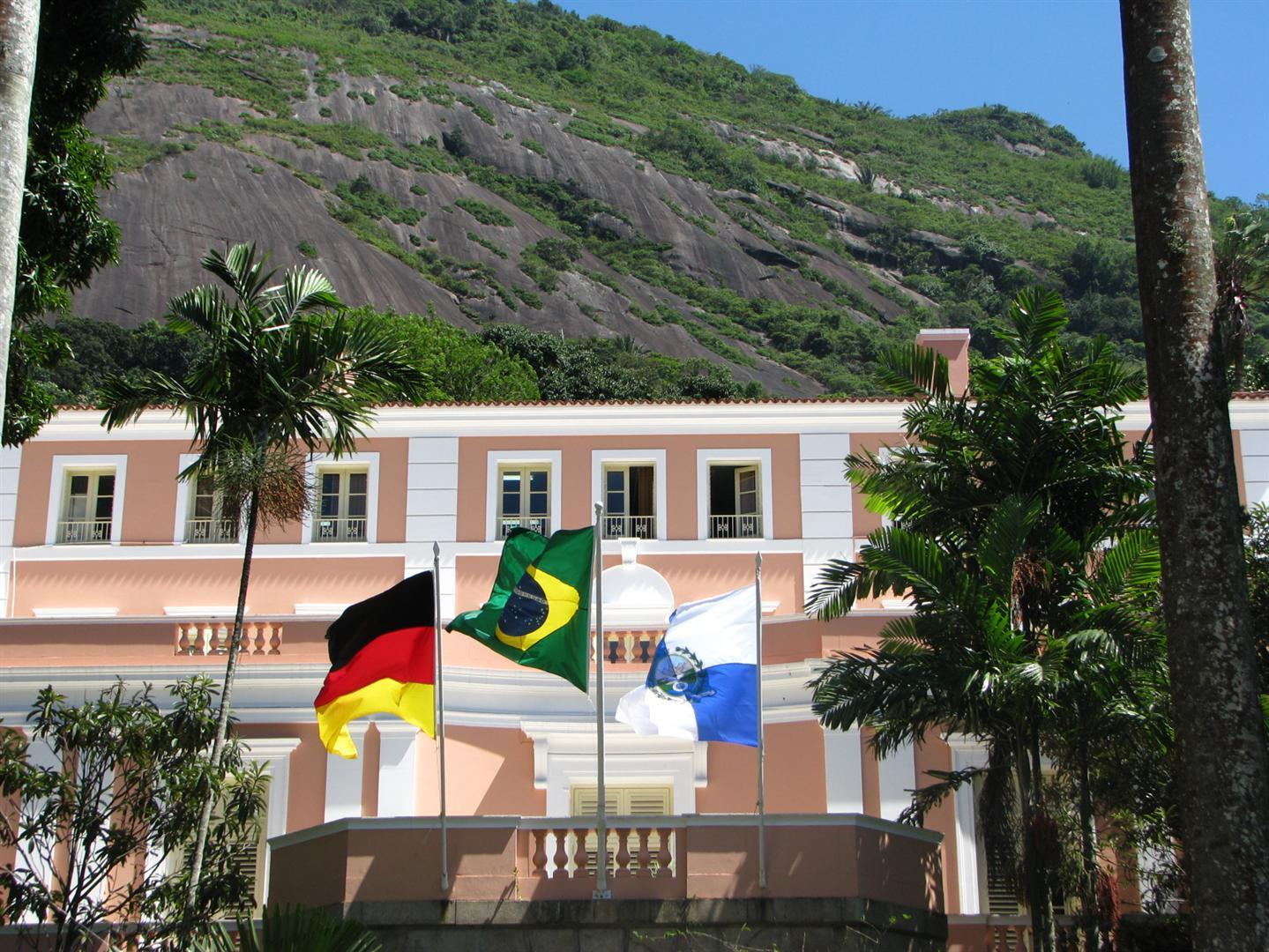
Deutsche Schule Rio de Janeiro

The Deutsche Schule Rio de Janeiro (Escola Alemã Corcovado) is located in Botafogo.
