= Darcy Ribeiro =

Brazilian anthropologist, historian, sociologist, author and politician

Senator for Rio de Janeiro
- In office February 1, 1991 – February 17, 1997
- Preceded by: Jamil Haddad
- Succeeded by: Abdias do Nascimento

Vice Governor of Rio de Janeiro
- In office March 15, 1983 – March 15, 1987
- Governor: Leonel Brizola
- Preceded by: Hamilton Xavier
- Succeeded by: Francisco Amaral

Chief of Staff of the Presidency
- In office June 18, 1963 – April 2, 1964
- President: João Goulart
- Preceded by: Evandro Lins e Silva
- Succeeded by: Getúlio de Moura

Minister of Education
- In office September 18, 1962 – January 23, 1963
- Prime Minister: Hermes Lima
- Preceded by: Roberto Lira
- Succeeded by: Teotônio Monteiro de Barros

Personal details
- Born: October 26, 1922 Montes Claros, Minas Gerais, Brazil
- Died: February 17, 1997 (aged 74) Brasília, Federal District, Brazil
- Party: PCB (1940–1964); PDT (1979–1997)
- Spouse: Berta Gleizer (m. 1948; sep. 1974)
- Education: Fundação Escola de Sociologia e Política de São Paulo (BA)
- Profession: anthropologist; historian; sociologist; writer; politician

Darcy Ribeiro (October 26, 1922 – February 17, 1997) was a Brazilian anthropologist, historian, sociologist, author and politician. His ideas have influenced several scholars of Brazilian and Latin American studies. As Minister of Education of Brazil he carried out profound reforms which led him to be invited to participate in university reforms in Chile, Peru, Venezuela, Mexico and Uruguay after leaving Brazil due to the 1964 coup d'état.

== Biography ==
Darcy Ribeiro was born in Montes Claros, in the state of Minas Gerais, the son of Reginaldo Ribeiro dos Santos and of Josefina Augusta da Silveira. He completed his primary and secondary education in his native town, at the Grupo Escolar Gonçalves Chaves and at the Ginásio Episcopal de Montes Claros.

He is best known for development work in the areas of education, sociology and anthropology and for being, along with his friend and colleague Anísio Teixeira, one of the founders of the University of Brasília in the early 1960s. He also served as the first rector of that university, and the campus is named after him. He was the founder of the State University of Norte Fluminense (Universidade Estadual do Norte Fluminense) as well. He wrote numerous books, many of them about the indigenous populations of Brazil.

During the first mandate of governor Leonel Brizola in Rio de Janeiro (1983–1987), Darcy Ribeiro created, planned and directed the implementation of the "Integrated Centers for Public Instruction" (Centros Integrados de Ensino Público), a visionary and revolutionary pedagogical project of assistance for children, including recreational and cultural activities beyond formal instruction – making concrete the projects envisioned decades earlier by Anísio Teixeira. Long before politicians incorporated the importance of education for the development of Brazil into their discourse, Darcy Ribeiro and Leonel Brizola had already developed these ideals.

In the elections of 1986, Ribeiro was the Democratic Labor Party (PDT) candidate for the governorship of Rio de Janeiro, running against Fernando Gabeira (at that time affiliated with the Workers’ Party), Agnaldo Timóteo of the Social Democratic Party (PDS) and Moreira Franco of the Brazilian Democratic Movement Party (PMDB). Ribeiro was defeated, being unable to overcome the high approval rating of Moreira who was elected due to the popularity of the then-recent currency reform, the Cruzado Plan (Plano Cruzado). Another defeat was in 1994, when he was Brizola's running-mate in the presidential election; Darcy Ribeiro was also chief of staff (Ministro-chefe da Casa Civil) in the cabinet of President João Goulart, vice-governor of Rio de Janeiro from 1983 to 1987 and exercised the mandate of senator from Rio de Janeiro from 1991 until his death. Darcy Ribeiro was elected to the Brazilian Academy of Letters (Academia Brasileira de Letras) on October 8, 1992. His election was to Chair Number 11, which has as its Patron Fagundes Varela. He was formally received into the Academy on April 15, 1993, by author Cândido Mendes. He died in Brasília, aged 74.

== His time in Latin America (1964–1976) ==
Little is known about Ribeiro's exile in Latin America. In April 1964, after the military coup that deposed Goulart, Ribeiro went into exile in Uruguay, where he worked as a professor of anthropology and planning advisor at the University of the Republic and met Argentine Manuel Sadosky, recognised as one of the pioneers in introducing computers for academic training and research in Latin America. In September 1968, Ribeiro returned to Brazil, but was arrested and spent nine months in preventive detention. After being tried by a military court and declared a person of maximum danger, he was acquitted due to lack of evidence. However, he was forced into exile, this time in Caracas in 1969, where he worked as a consultant for the university reform of the Central University of Venezuela. At the end of 1970, he was invited by President Salvador Allende to advise the Chilean government and, at the same time, served as a research professor and advisor at the University of Chile. During those years, Ribeiro published important books such as El proceso civilizatorio (The Civilising Process), Las Américas y la civilización (The Americas and Civilisation), El dilema de América Latina (The Dilemma of Latin America), Fronteras indígenas de la civilización (Indigenous Frontiers of Civilisation) and La universidad necesaria (The Necessary University). His last stage was in Peru, during the Revolutionary Government of the Armed Forces, where Ribeiro was head and international co-director of the Centre for the Study of Popular Participation (CENTRO), a project co-financed by the ILO and Sinamos (1972-1976). With the support of mathematician Oscar Varsavsky, he developed a global computational model of Peruvian society and economy at CENTRO, which in turn could feed into a database.

== Thought ==
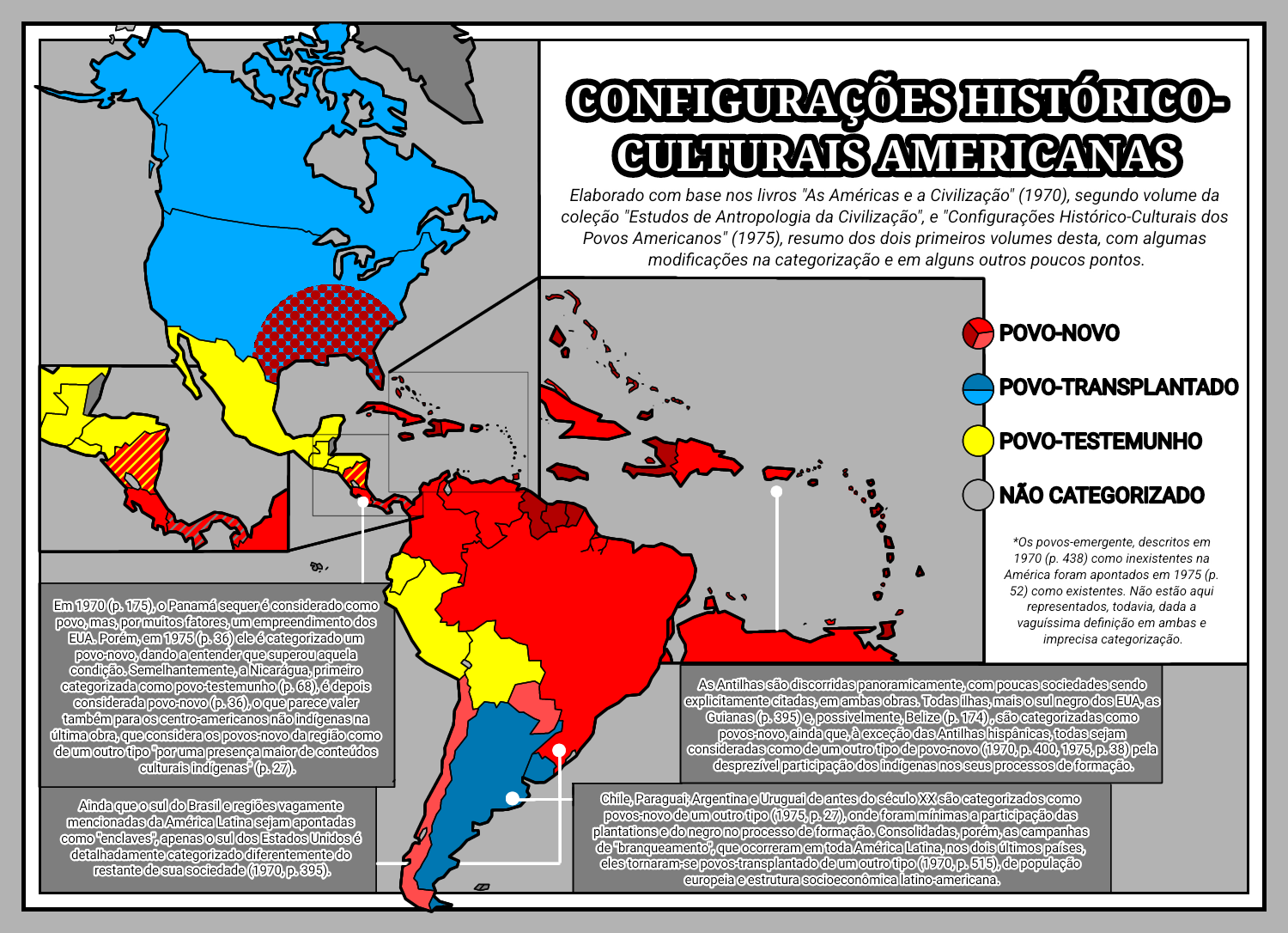
Map showing Darcy Ribeiro's classification of Latin American countries into "New Peoples" (Red), "Witness Peoples" (Yellow) and "Transplanted Peoples" (Blue)

Darcy Ribeiro's ideas belonged to the evolutionist school of sociology and anthropology, and his main influences were Neoevolutionists Leslie White and Julian Steward, and the Marxist archeologist V. Gordon Childe. He believed that people went through a "civilizatory process" beginning as hunter-gatherers. This "civilizatory process" was according to him marked by technological revolutions, and among these he stress the eight more important as the following:

- the agricultural revolution
- the urban revolution
- the irrigation revolution
- the metallurgic revolution
- the livestock revolution
- the mercantile revolution
- the Industrial Revolution
- the thermonuclear revolution

Ribeiro proposed also a classification scheme for the world peoples, emphasizing the American countries, where he identified "New Peoples" (Chile, Colombia, Paraguay, Venezuela etc.), that merged from the mix of several cultures; "Witness Peoples" (Peru, Mexico, Ecuador, Guatemala etc), remnants of ancient civilizations; and "Transplanted Peoples" (USA, Canada, Argentina and Uruguay), European diasporas without significative other people influences.

== Selected works ==
Ethnology

- Culturas e línguas indígenas do Brasil – 1957
- Arte plumária dos índios Kaapo – 1957
- A política indigenista brasileira – 1962
- Os índios e a civilização – 1970
- Uira sai, à procura de Deus – 1974
- Configurações histórico-culturais dos povos americanos – 1975
- Suma etnológica brasileira – 1986 (colaboração; três volumes).
- Diários índios – os urubus-kaapor – 1996

Anthropology

- O processo civilizatório – etapas da evolução sócio-cultural – 1968
- As Américas e a civilização – processo de formação e causas do desenvolvimento cultural desigual dos povos americanos – 1970
- Os índios e a civilização – a integração das populações indígenas no Brasil moderno – 1970
- The culture – historical configurations of the American peoples – 1970
- Os brasileiros – teoria do Brasil – 1972
- O dilema da América Latina – estruturas do poder e forças insurgentes – 1978
- O povo brasileiro – a formação e o sentido do Brasil – 1995

Romances

- Maíra – 1976
- O mulo – 1981
- Utopia selvagem – 1982
- Migo – 1988

Essays

- Kadiwéu – ensaios etnológicos sobre o saber, o azar e a beleza – 1950
- Configurações histórico-culturais dos povos americanos – 1975
- Sobre o óbvio - ensaios insólitos – 1979
- Aos trancos e barrancos – como o Brasil deu no que deu – 1985
- América Latina: a pátria grande – 1986
- Testemunho – 1990
- A fundação do Brasil – 1500/1700 – 1992 (colaboração)
- O Brasil como problema – 1995
- Noções de coisas – 1995

Education

- Plano orientador da Universidade de Brasília – 1962
- A universidade necessária – 1969
- Propuestas – acerca da la renovación – 1970
- Université des Sciences Humaines d'Alger – 1972
- La universidad peruana – 1974
- UnB – invenção e descaminho – 1978
- Nossa escola é uma calamidade – 1984
- Universidade do terceiro milênio – plano orientador da Universidade Estadual do Norte Fluminense – 1993

Political offices
| Preceded by Roberto Lira | Minister of Education; 1962–1963 | Succeeded by Teotônio Monteiro de Barros |
| Preceded by Evandro Lins e Silva | Chief of Staff of the Presidency; 1963–1964 | Succeeded by Getúlio de Moura |
| Preceded by Hamilton Xavier | Vice Governor of Rio de Janeiro; 1983–1987 | Succeeded by Francisco Amaral |
Academic offices
| Preceded by Deolindo Couto | 7th Academic of the 11th Chair of the Brazilian Academy of Letters; 1993–1997 | Succeeded by Celso Furtado |
