= Federal Institute of Education, Science and Technology =

IFET symbol.

Federal Institute of Education, Science and Technology (in Portuguese: Instituto Federal de Educação, Ciência e Tecnologia, IFET) is a Brazilian institution of higher education with a number of campi around Brazil. Comprising Brazil's Federal Network of Vocational, Scientific and Technological Education, it offers students a wide range of curricula, including both general education and specialized vocational and professional training in science, technology, and pedagogy.

The bill creating the institution was approved by the Chamber of Deputies, by the Federal Senate, and, on December 29, 2008, by the Brazilian president of the Republic. It was published in the Diário Oficial da União (Federal Official Gazette) on December 30, 2008.

== Creation ==
On July 16, 2008, President Luiz Inácio Lula da Silva signed Bill 3775/2008, proposing the creation of 38 federal institutes of education, science, and technology in Brazil. The Bill was approved in the National Congress and signed into law by the President on December 29, 2008. The purpose of the institutes was to enable a large number of students to train in the fields of science, technology, and science-and-technology pedagogy, strengthening Brazil's capacity to develop cutting-edge technical and technological solutions to a range of challenges, and implement those solutions to benefit the wider community.

The Bill provided that half the enrollment slots would be allocated to students taking intermediate-level technical courses as part of an integrated curriculum.

For those students pursuing higher education, the emphasis was to be on advanced courses in engineering and other technological disciplines. Bachelor's degrees were to be offered in physics, chemistry, mathematics, and biology. In addition, the institutes were directed to encourage students to study educational methodologies that would equip them to teach mechanics, electrical engineering and informatics. Students were also to be encouraged to pursue licensure in specialized areas of technological and professional expertise.

Under the Bill, each federal institute was to comprise several campi, and develop annual budget proposals for each campus and program within its jurisdiction. Each federal institute was to have its own governing body (“Superior Council”), which, as to its assigned geographic district, would have independent authority to create and discontinue courses and grant diplomas. The institutes were also to have a role n accrediting and certifying professional-license-granting organizations.

== Brazilian IFETs ==
=== Acre ===
- Instituto Federal do Acre, through transformation of the Escola Técnica Federal do Acre;

=== Alagoas ===
- Instituto Federal de Alagoas, through transformation of the Centro Federal de Educação Tecnológica de Alagoas and Escola Agrotécnica Federal de Satuba.

=== Amapá ===
- Instituto Federal do Amapá, through transformation of the Escola Técnica Federal do Amapá.

=== Amazonas ===
- Instituto Federal do Amazonas, through transformation of the Centro Federal de Educação Tecnológica do Amazonas, Escola Agrotécnica Federal de Manaus and Escola Agrotécnica Federal São Gabriel da Cachoeira.

=== Bahia ===
- Instituto Federal da Bahia, through transformation of the Centro Federal de Educação Tecnológica da Bahia.
- Instituto Federal Baiano, through integration of Escola Agrotécnica Federal de Catu, Escola Agrotécnica Federal de Guanambi (Antonio José Teixeira), Escola Agrotécnica Federal de Santa Inês] and Escola Agrotécnica Federal de Senhor do Bonfim.

=== Distrito Federal ===
- Instituto Federal de Brasília, through transformation of the Escola Técnica Federal de Brasília.

=== Ceará ===
- Instituto Federal do Ceará, mediante integração do Centro Federal de Educação Tecnológica do Ceará e da Escola Agrotécnica Federal de Crato e Escola Agrotécnica Federal de Iguatu.

=== Espírito Santo ===
- Instituto Federal do Espírito Santo, through integration of Centro Federal de Educação Tecnológica do Espírito Santo, Escola Agrotécnica Federal de Alegre, Escola Agrotécnica Federal de Colatina and Escola Agrotécnica Federal de Santa Teresa.

=== Goiás ===
- Instituto Federal de Goiás, through transformation of Centro Federal de Educação Tecnológica de Goiás.
- Instituto Federal Goiano, through integration of Centro Federal de Educação Tecnológica de Rio Verde, Centro Federal de Educação Tecnológica de Urutaí, and Escola Agrotécnica Federal de Ceres.

=== Maranhão ===
- Instituto Federal do Maranhão, through integration of Centro Federal de Educação Tecnológica do Maranhão, Escola Agrotécnica Federal de Codó, Escola Agrotécnica Federal de São Luís and Escola Agrotécnica Federal de São Raimundo das Mangabeiras.

=== Minas Gerais ===
- Instituto Federal de Minas Gerais, through integration of Centro Federal de Educação Tecnológica de Ouro Preto, Centro Federal de Educação Tecnológica de Bambuí, and Escola Agrotécnica Federal de São João Evangelista.
- Instituto Federal do Norte de Minas Gerais, through integration of Centro Federal de Educação Tecnológica de Januária and Escola Agrotécnica Federal de Salinas.
- Instituto Federal do Sudeste de Minas, through integration of Centro Federal de Educação Tecnológica de Rio Pomba, Escola Agrotécnica Federal de Barbacena and Colégio Técnico Universitário of UFJF.
- Instituto Federal do Sul de Minas, through integration of Escola Agrotécnica Federal de Inconfidentes, Escola Agrotécnica Federal de Machado and Escola Agrotécnica Federal de Muzambinho.
- Instituto Federal do Triângulo Mineiro, through integration of Centro Federal de Educação Tecnológica de Uberaba and Escola Agrotécnica Federal de Uberlândia.

=== Mato Grosso ===
- Instituto Federal de Mato Grosso, through integration of Centro Federal de Educação Tecnológica do Mato Grosso, Centro Federal de Educação Tecnológica de Cuiabá, and Escola Agrotécnica Federal de Cáceres.

=== Mato Grosso do Sul ===
- Federal Institute of Mato Grosso do Sul (IFMS) (Instituto Federal de Mato Grosso do Sul), through integration of Escola Técnica Federal do Mato Grosso do Sul and Escola Agrotécnica Federal de Nova Andradina.

=== Pará ===
- Instituto Federal do Pará, through integration of Centro Federal de Educação Tecnológica do Pará, Escola Agrotécnica Federal de Castanhal e Escola Agrotécnica Federal de Marabá.

=== Paraíba ===
- Instituto Federal da Paraíba, through integration of Centro Federal de Educação Tecnológica da Paraíba and Escola Agrotécnica Federal de Sousa.

=== Pernambuco ===
- Instituto Federal de Pernambuco, through integration of Centro Federal de Educação Tecnológica de Pernambuco, Escola Agrotécnica Federal de Barreiros, Escola Agrotécnica Federal de Belo Jardim and Escola Agrotécnica Federal de Vitória de Santo Antão.
- Instituto Federal do Sertão Pernambucano, through transformation of Centro Federal de Educação Tecnológica de Petrolina.

=== Piauí ===
- Instituto Federal do Piauí, through transformation of Centro Federal de Educação Tecnológica do Piauí.

=== Paraná ===
- Instituto Federal do Paraná, through transformation of Escola Técnica da Universidade Federal do Paraná.

=== Rio de Janeiro ===
- Instituto Federal do Rio de Janeiro, through fusion of the Centro Federal de Educação Tecnológica de Química de Nilópolis and Colégio Agrícola Nilo Peçanha.This institute also encompasses the campus that is the Rio de Janeiro Olympic Park.
- Instituto Federal Fluminense, through transformation of Centro Federal de Educação Tecnológica de Campos and Colégio Técnico Agrícola Ildefonso Bastos Borges.
- Colégio Pedro II equated to other institutes by force of Brazilian federal law no. 12,677, of June 25, 2012.

=== Rio Grande do Norte ===
- Instituto Federal do Rio Grande do Norte, through transformation of Centro Federal de Educação Tecnológica do Rio Grande do Norte.

=== Rio Grande do Sul ===
- Instituto Federal do Rio Grande do Sul, through integration of Centro Federal de Educação Tecnológica de Bento Gonçalves, Escola Técnica da Universidade Federal do Rio Grande do Sul, da Escola Técnica Federal de Canoas and Escola Agrotécnica Federal de Sertão.
- Instituto Federal Farroupilha, through integration of Centro Federal de Educação Tecnológica de São Vicente do Sul and Escola Agrotécnica Federal de Alegrete.
- Instituto Federal Sul-rio-grandense, through integration of Centro Federal de Educação Tecnológica de Pelotas.

=== Rondônia ===
- Instituto Federal de Rondônia, through integration of Escola Técnica Federal de Rondônia and Escola Agrotécnica Federal de Colorado do Oeste.

=== Roraima ===
- Instituto Federal de Roraima, through transformation of Centro Federal de Educação Tecnológica de Roraima.

=== Santa Catarina ===
- Instituto Federal de Santa Catarina, through transformation of Centro Federal de Educação Tecnológica de Santa Catarina.
- Instituto Federal Catarinense, through integration of Escola Agrotécnica Federal de Concórdia, Escola Agrotécnica Federal de Rio do Sul and Escola Agrotécnica Federal de Sombrio.

=== São Paulo ===
- Instituto Federal de São Paulo, through transformation of Centro Federal de Educação Tecnológica de São Paulo.

=== Sergipe ===
- Instituto Federal de Sergipe, through integration of Centro Federal de Educação Tecnológica de Sergipe and Escola Agrotécnica Federal de São Cristóvão.

=== Tocantins ===
- Instituto Federal do Tocantins, through integration of Escola Técnica Federal de Palmas and Escola Agrotécnica Federal de Araguatins.

== See also ==
- Education in Brazil
- Federal Centers for Technological Education

== Bibliography ==
- Eliezer Pacheco (Org.), "Os Institutos Federais: Uma Revolução na Educação Profissional e Tecnológica", Brasília, São Paulo, 2011, Editora Moderna, ISBN 978-85-16-07375-6, 120 pp.
- Eliezer Pacheco, "Os Institutos Federais: Uma Revolução na Educação Profissional e Tecnológica", Cartilha do Ministério da Educação, Secretaria de Educação Profissional e Tecnológica, Brasília, 24 pp.
