= Campo Grande International Airport =

Airport in Brazil

Campo Grande–Ueze Elias Zahran International Airport Aeroporto Internacional de Campo Grande–Ueze Elias Zahran
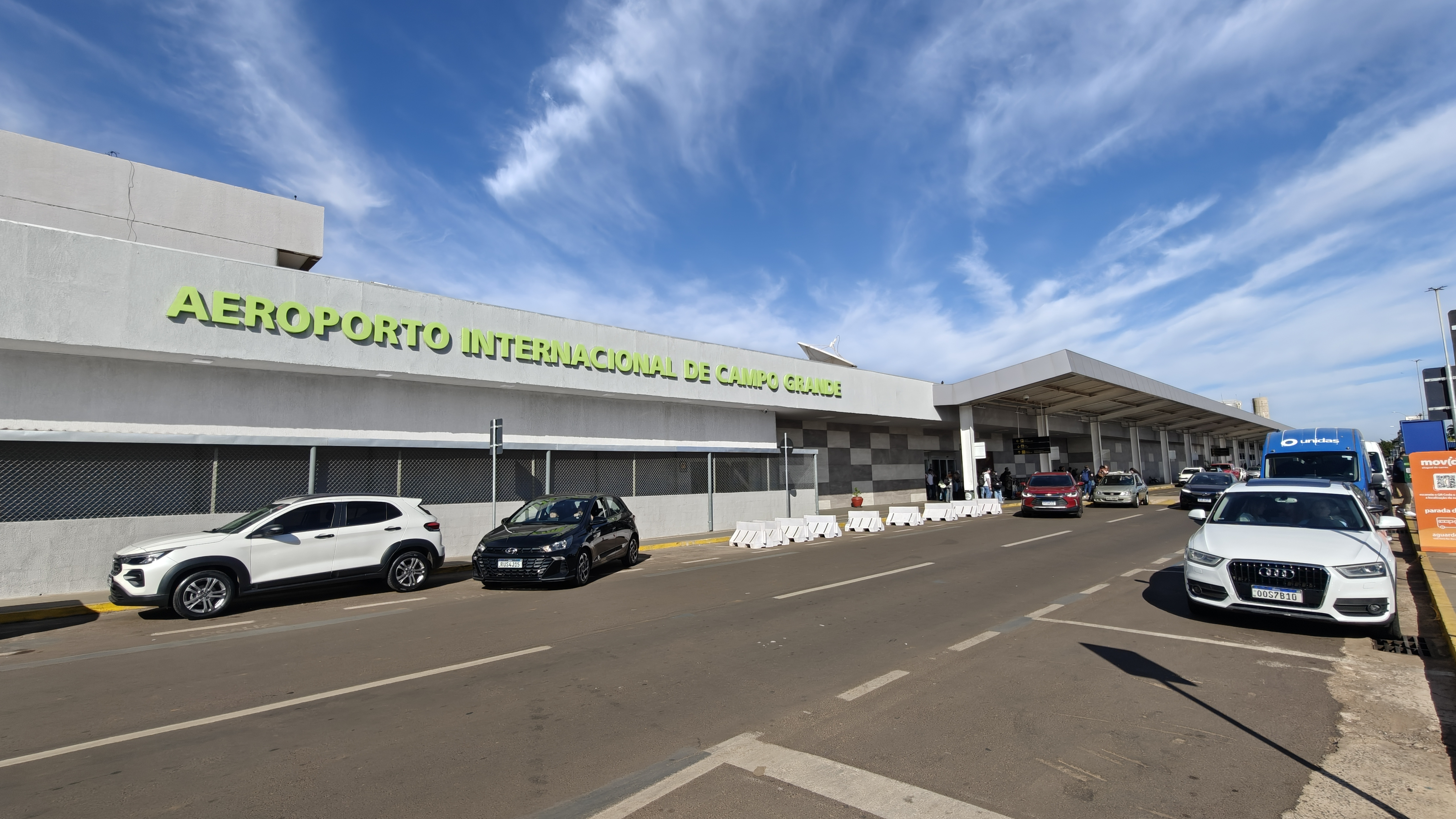
- IATA: CGR; ICAO: SBCG; LID: MS0001

Summary
- Airport type: Public/Military
- Operator: Infraero (1975–2022); AENA (2022–present)
- Serves: Campo Grande
- Time zone: BRT−1 (UTC−04:00)
- Elevation AMSL: 559 m (1,834 ft)
- Coordinates: 20°28′10″S 054°40′13″W

Map
- Location in Brazil

Runways
Direction	Length		Surface
Direction	m	ft	Surface
06/24	2,600	8,530	Asphalt

Statistics (2025)
- Passengers: 1,584,934 ▲3%
- Aircraft Operations: 15,494 ▼4%
- Metric tonnes of cargo: 2,707 ▲1%
- Statistics: AENA; Sources: ANAC, DECEA

Campo Grande–Ueze Elias Zahran International Airport (IATA: CGR, ICAO: SBCG), sometimes also informally referred to as Antônio João Airport, after the neighborhood where it is located, is the airport serving Campo Grande, Brazil. Since October 18, 2021 it is named after Ueze Elias Zahran (1924–2018), a local entrepreneur.

It is operated by AENA.

Some of its facilities are shared with the Campo Grande Air Force Base of the Brazilian Air Force.

== History ==
The airport started operating in the 1930s as a military airfield. In the 1950s, the airport began to operate with commercial flights. The passenger terminal was dedicated in 1964.

Between 1975 and 2022 it was operated by Infraero. The passenger terminal was enlarged from 1,500m² to 5,000m² during the 1980s and to 6,082 m in 1998.

Previously operated by Infraero, on August 18, 2022, the consortium AENA won a 30-year concession to operate the airport.

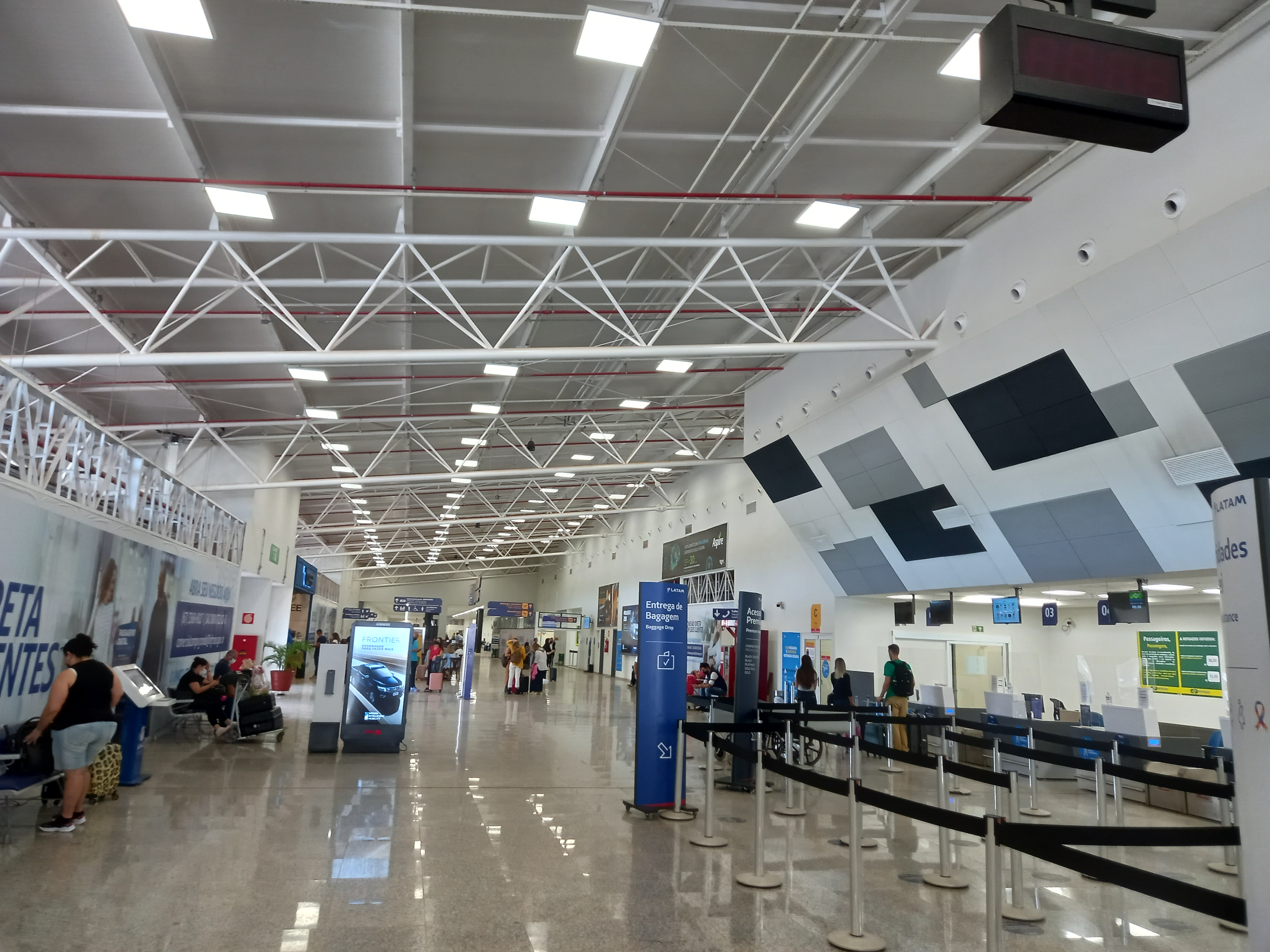
Main hall

== Airlines and destinations ==
Airlines	Destinations
Azul Brazilian Airlines	Belo Horizonte-Confins, Campinas
Gol Linhas Aéreas	Rio de Janeiro–Galeão (ends 30 January 2027), São Paulo–Congonhas, São Paulo–Guarulhos
LATAM Brasil	Brasília, São Paulo–Congonhas, São Paulo–Guarulhos

== Statistics ==
Following are the number of passenger, aircraft and cargo movements at the airport, according to Infraero (2007–2022) and AENA (2023–2025) reports:

Year	Passenger	Aircraft	Cargo (t)
2025	1,584,934 ▲3%	15,494 ▼4%	2,707 ▲1%
2024	1,532,499	16,188 ▼3%	2,669 ▲12%
2023	1,526,719 ▲12%	16,721 ▲6%	2,390 ▼12%
2022	1,358,744 ▲32%	15,712 ▲24%	2,724 ▲11%
2021	1,031,542 ▲45%	12,664 ▲24%	2,457 ▲29%
2020	712,294 ▼54%	10,224 ▼43%	1,903 ▼50%
2019	1,541,990 ▼2%	18,027 ▼7%	3,820 ▲2%
2018	1,578,585 ▲3%	19,357 ▲3%	3,733 ▲83%
2017	1,536,838 ▲5%	18,792 ▼3%	2,035 ▼6%
2016	1,459,007 ▼6%	19,466 ▼15%	2,168 ▼9%
2015	1,555,602 ▼5%	22,825 ▼8%	2,377 ▲7%
2014	1,638,513 ▲3%	24,843 ▼3%	2,217 ▼6%
2013	1,592,471 ▼4%	25,539 ▼16%	2,366 ▼7%
2012	1,655,073 ▲9%	30,250 ▼2%	2,531 ▼51%
2011	1,515,540 ▲25%	30,991 ▼1%	5,137 ▲34%
2010	1,208,765 ▲18%	31,382 ▲11%	3,844 ▼16%
2009	1,028,643 ▲23%	28,152 ▲12%	4,596
2008	835,034 ▲10%	25,075 ▲9%	4,604 ▲1%
2007	758,983	22,964	4,558

== Access ==
The airport is located 7 km (4 mi) from downtown Campo Grande. It is served by public transportation with bus lines 409 and 414.

== See also ==
- List of airports in Brazil
- Campo Grande Air Force Base
