= Federal Institute of Mato Grosso do Sul =

Public federal vocational college in Mato Grosso do Sul, Brazil

- Institutum Foederale Mato Grosso do Sul
- Other name: IFMS
- Type: Vocational and higher education college; engineering, technical, and life sciences education
- Established: 2008
- Parent institution: Brazil Ministry of Education
- Total staff: 1,000 (as of 2025)
- Students: 11,000 (as of 2025)
- Location: Campo Grande, Mato Grosso do Sul, Brazil; 20°27′19″S 54°38′58″W
- Campus: Multiple; urban
- Language: Brazilian Portuguese
- Website: ifms.edu.br
- Location of the IFMS in Brazil

The Federal Institute of Mato Grosso do Sul (Brazilian Portuguese: Institutum Foederale Mato Grosso do Sul), abbreviated as IFMS, officially the Federal Institute of Education, Science and Technology of Mato Grosso do Sul, is a vocational and higher education college that is focused on engineering, technical, and life sciences education with multiple campuses, located in Campo Grande, Mato Grosso do Sul, Brazil. The institute is part of the expansion program of the Federal Network of Professional, Scientific and Technological Education, of the Ministry of Education.

== Overview ==
Established in 2008, IFMS had approximately 1,000 staff and 11,000 students as of 2025 studying to complete diploma, bachelor, and masters courses, focusing on technology, engineering, and life sciences. IFMS also conducts research in bioengineering and environmental sciences.

In 2016, the Dourados Campus began the school year in its permanent location. On October 25, the Jardim Campus was handed over to the community. The permanent location of the Campo Grande Campus began operating in July 2017, and the Corumbá location in the first half of 2018. The Naviraí Campus operates in temporary locations. In 2024, the Federal Government announced the creation of the Amambai and Paranaíba campuses, as part of a new expansion plan for the Federal Network.

== See also ==
- Federal Institute of Education, Science and Technology
- List of research institutes in Brazil
- List of universities in Brazil
