= Campo Grande =

Capital city of Mato Grosso do Sul, Brazil

- Municipality
- Municipality of Campo Grande
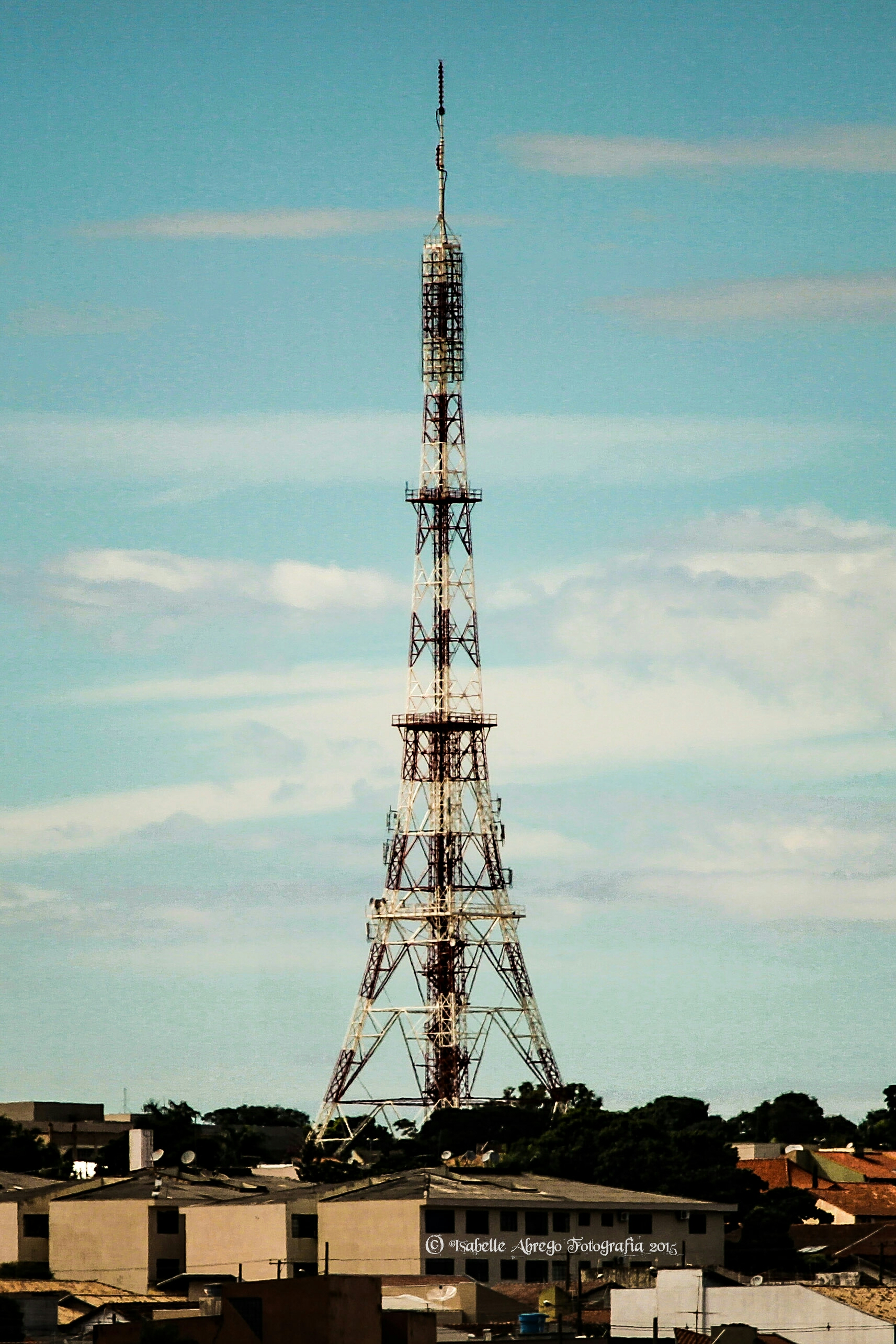
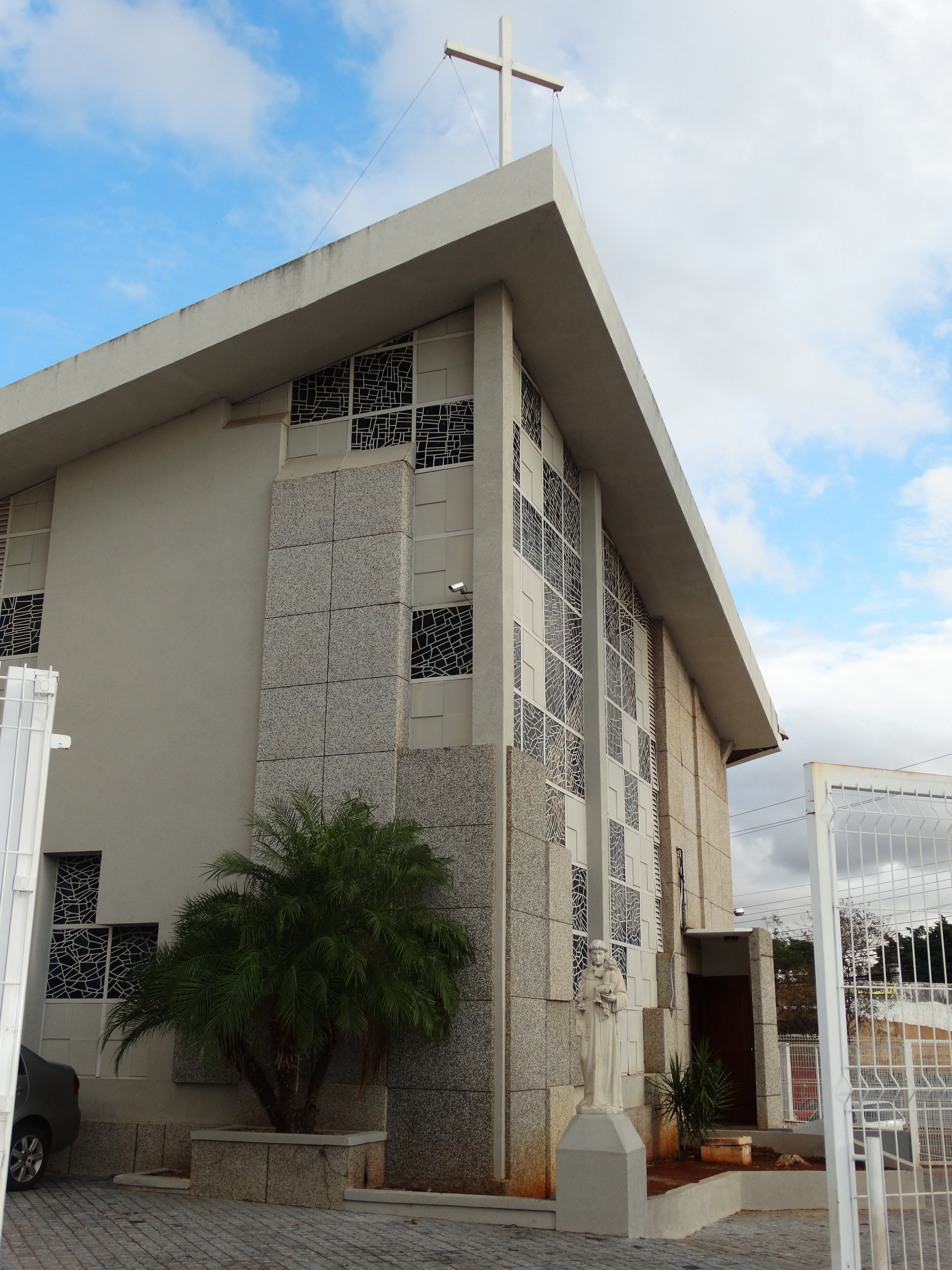
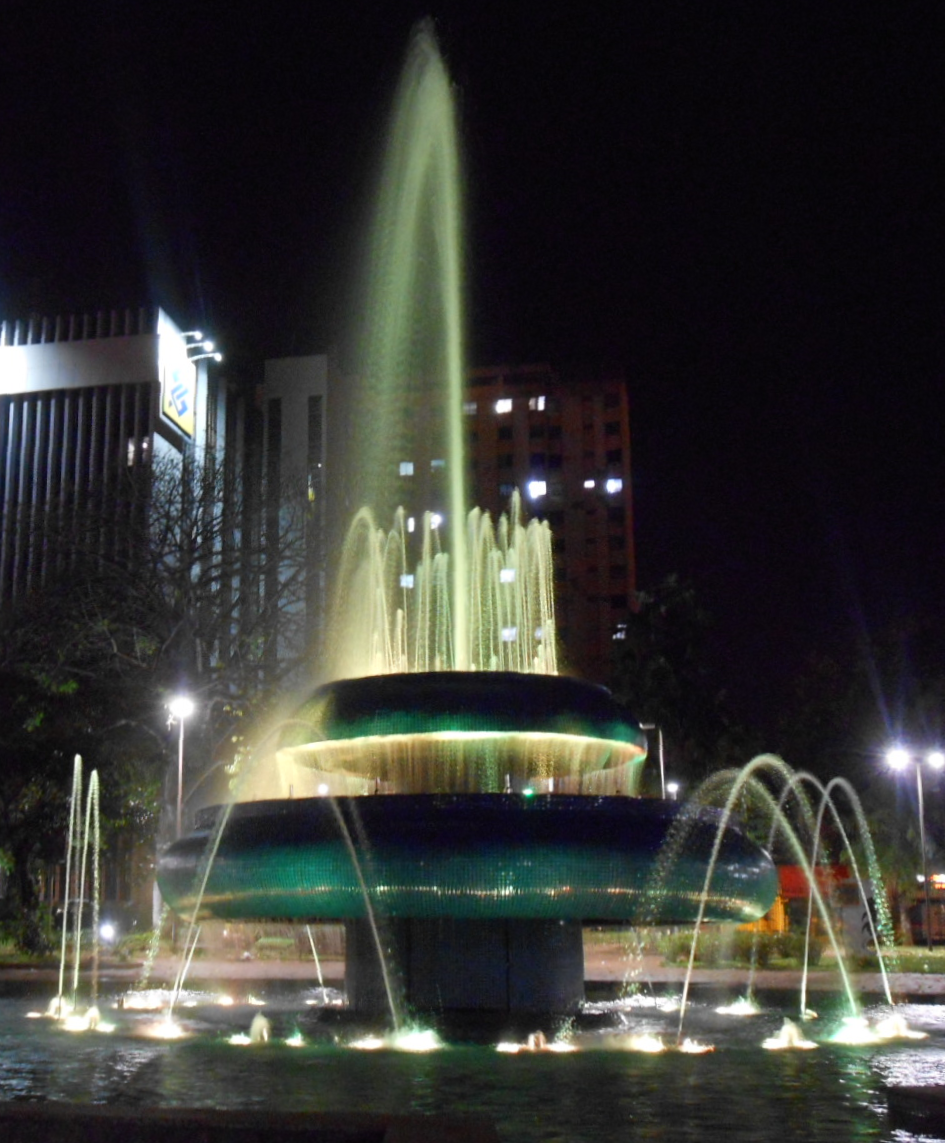
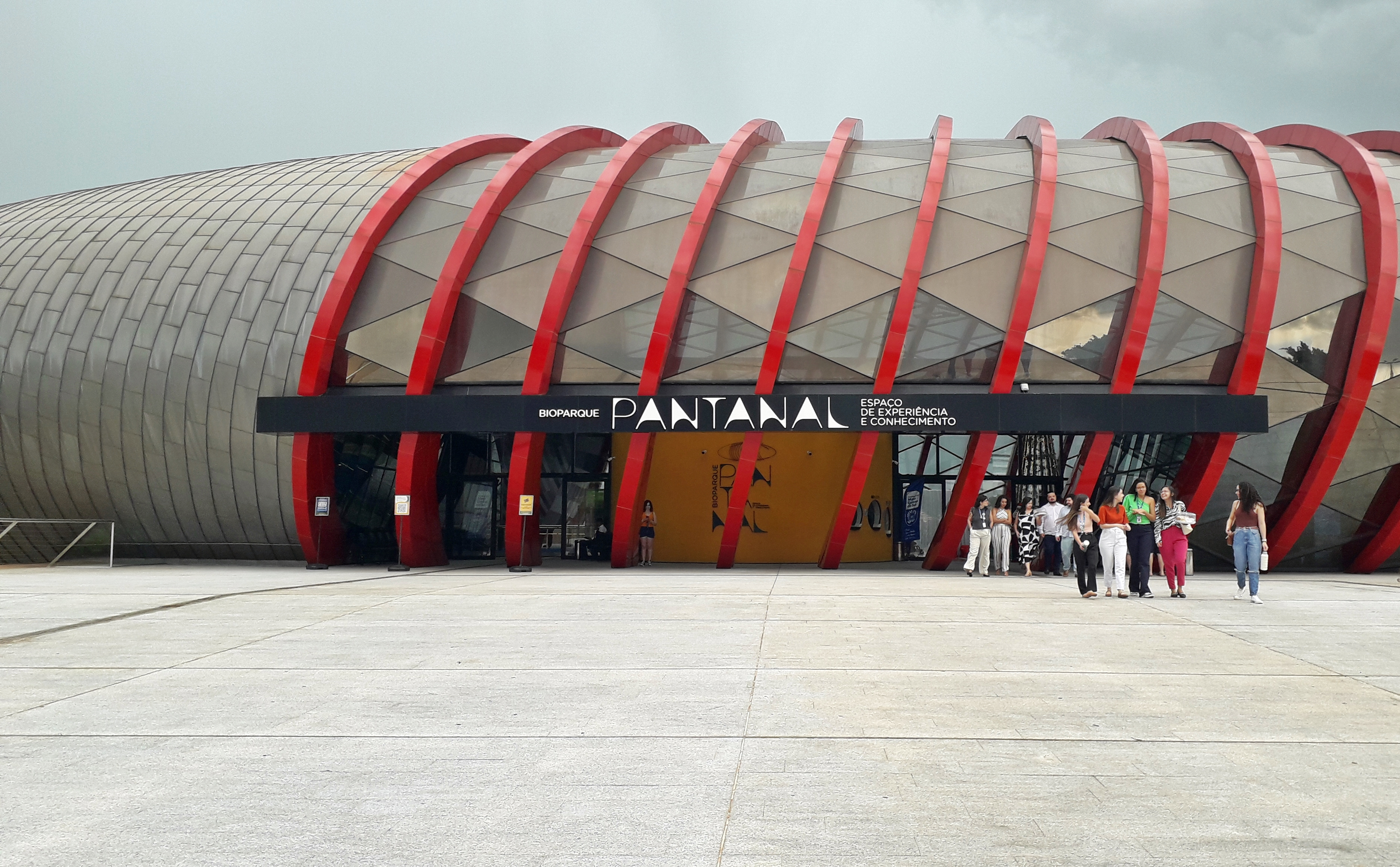
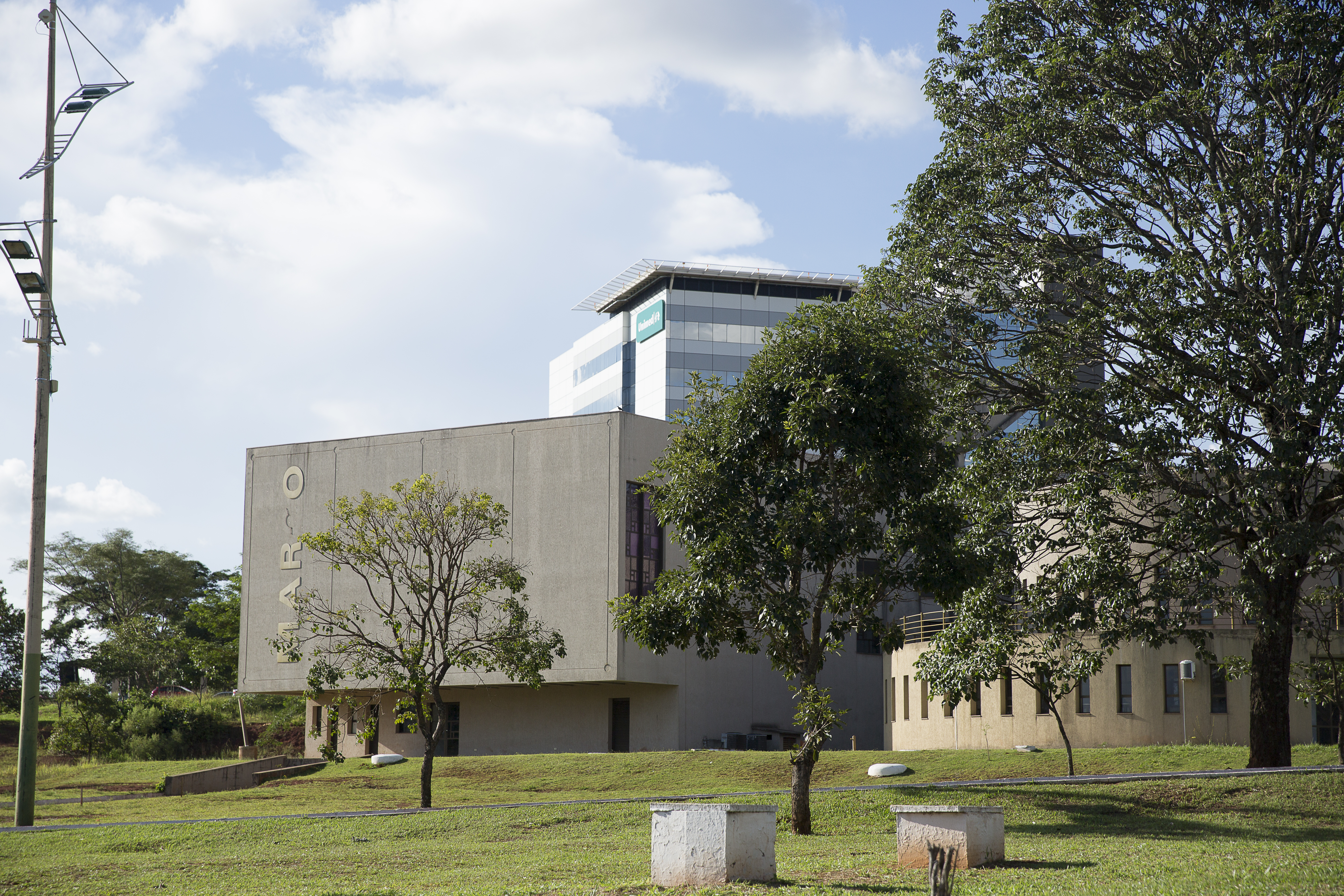
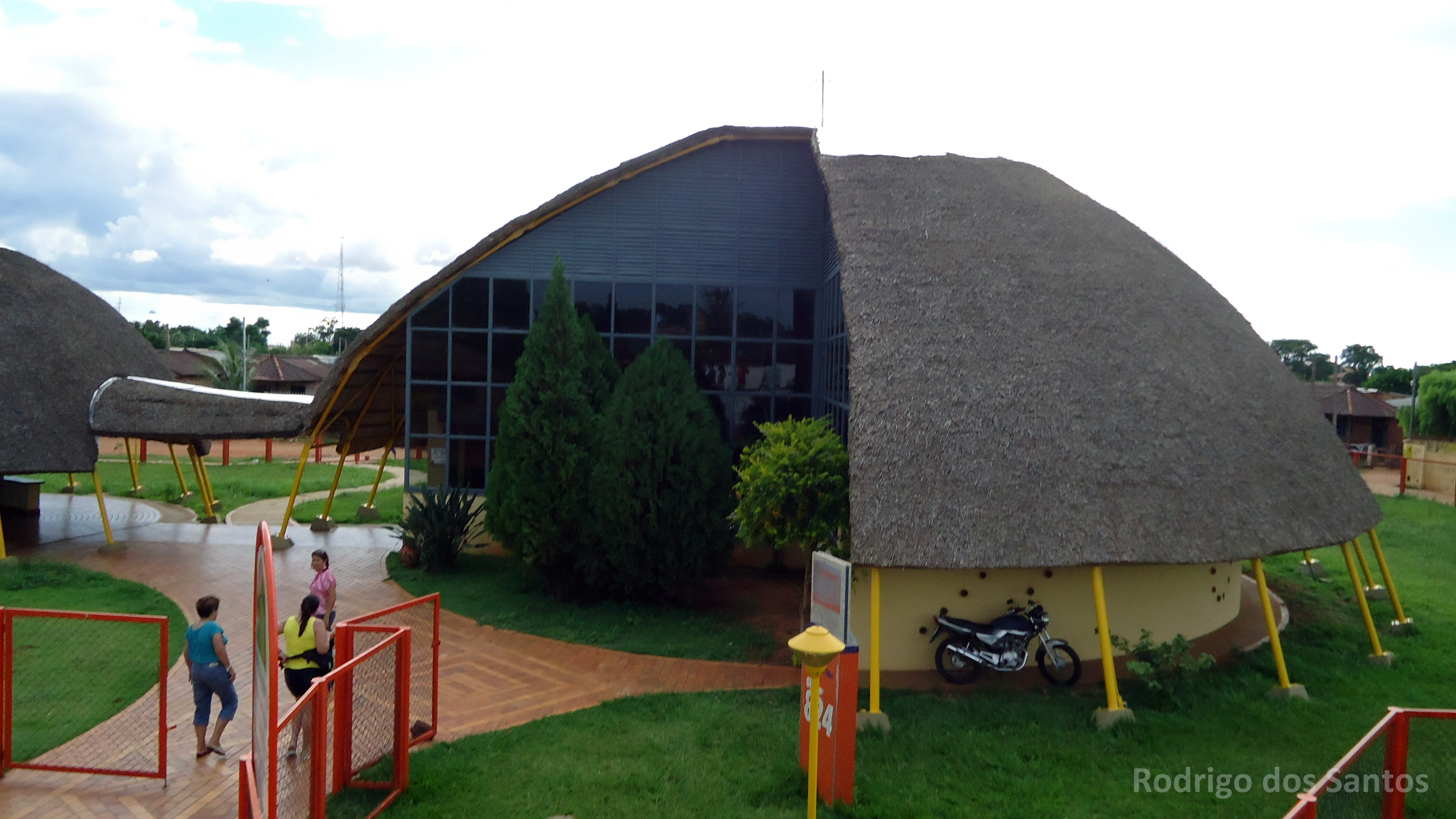
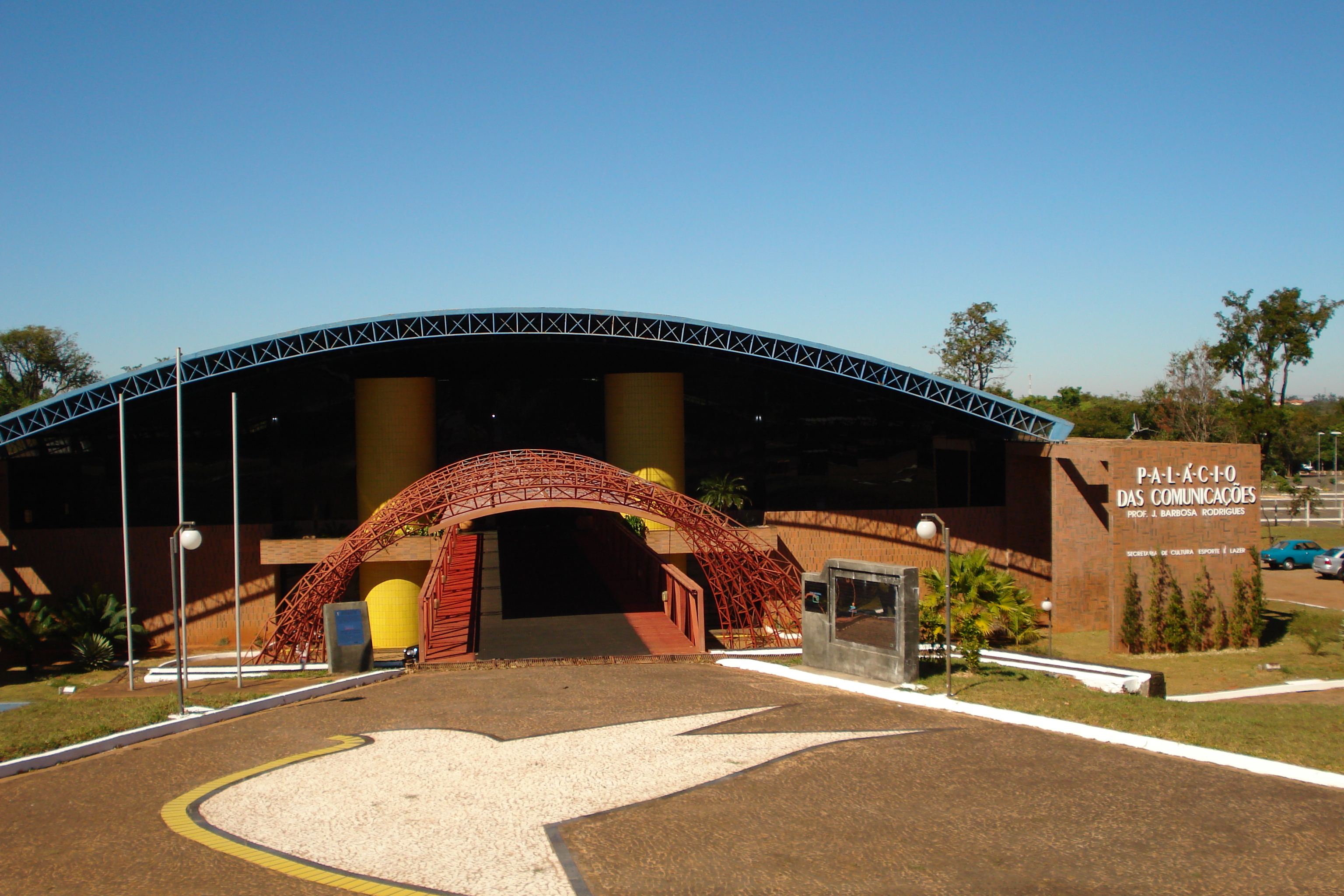
- Skyline with Afonso Pena Avenue TV Morena Tower Campo Grande Cathedral Ary Coelho Square Pantanal Biopark Indigenous Nations Park Memorial of Indigenous Culture Communications Palace

- Flag Coat of arms
- Nicknames: Cidade Morena (Portuguese for "Brown City"), CG, Campão (Big Field)
- Motto: "Poder, prosperidade e altruísmo" (Portuguese) "Power, prosperity and altruism"
- Location in Mato Grosso do Sul
- Coordinates: 20°29′02″S 54°36′54″W
- Country: Brazil
- Region: Central-West Region
- State: Mato Grosso do Sul
- Founded: 1899

Government
  - Mayor: Adriane Lopes

Area
  - Municipality: 8,096.05 km^{2} (3,125.90 sq mi)
  - Urban: 154.5 km^{2} (59.7 sq mi)
- Elevation: 592 m (1,942 ft)

Population (2026)
  - Municipality: 970,843 (17th)
  - Density: 97.3/km^{2} (252/sq mi)
- Demonym: campo-grandense (Portuguese)
- Time zone: UTC-4 (UTC-4)
  - Summer (DST): UTC-3 (UTC-3)
- Postal Code: 79000-001 to 79129-999
- Area code: +55 67
- HDI (2010): 0.784 – high
- Website: www.capital.ms.gov.br

Campo Grande (Brazilian Portuguese: [ˈkɐ̃pu ˈɡɾɐ̃dʒi], lit. 'Great Field') is a city in the central and western region of Brazil, capital and the largest city of the state of Mato Grosso do Sul. Historically a stronghold of separatists from the North and South, the city is planned in the middle of a vast green space, with wide streets and tree-lined avenues.

The region where the city is located was in the past a waypoint for travellers who wanted to go from São Paulo or Minas Gerais to northern Mato Grosso by land. In the early 1900s, a railway was completed, connecting Campo Grande to Corumbá on the Bolivian border and to Bauru, São Paulo. Also in the beginning of the 20th century, the Western Brazilian Army Headquarters was established in Campo Grande, making it an important military center.

With a population growth from 140,000 people in 1970 to 750,000 people in 2007, Campo Grande is the third largest urban center of the Center-West region, and the 17th largest city in the country. In 1977, the State of Mato Grosso was split into two, and Campo Grande became the capital of the new state of Mato Grosso do Sul, comprising the southern portion of the former state. By that time, Campo Grande had long surpassed the latter's capital city of Cuiabá in population, which is unusual in Brazil, where most capitals are also the states' largest cities.

Today, the city has its own culture, which is a mixture of several ethnic groups, most notably immigrants from the Japanese prefecture of Okinawa, Middle Easterners, Armenians, Portuguese people, Germans, Italians, Spaniards, and Paraguayans, finally mixed with Asian and European Brazilians from the Brazilian Southern and Southeast regions, its native Amerindian peoples and Afro-Brazilians.

== History ==
Campo Grande started as a small village founded in 1877 by farmers José Antônio Pereira and Manoel Vieira de Sousa (a.k.a. Manoel Olivério), who came from Minas Gerais just after the end of the Paraguayan War. They founded the village, known at that time as Santo Antônio de Campo Grande, near the Serra de Maracaju cliffs, at the confluence of two streams named Prosa and Segredo (Portuguese for "conversation" and "secret," respectively), whose courses now coincide with two of the city's most important avenues. In the late 1877, the founder built the village's first church. The roughly aligned houses formed the first street, known as Rua Velha (Old Street), today Rua 26 de Agosto (26 August Street). This street ended where today one finds a square in honor of the immigrants that later came to the city. In 1930, the city was the theater of a small conflict involving governmental forces, led by Getulio Vargas, and indigenous groups. The rebels seized large parts of the city until government reinforcement arrived and ended the conflict.

The city started to develop relatively fast because of its privileged climate and location. These factors drew people from other regions of the country, especially the South, the Southeast and the Northeast regions. The settlement was officially recognized as a municipality by the State Government on August 26, 1899, and renamed Campo Grande.

== Geography ==
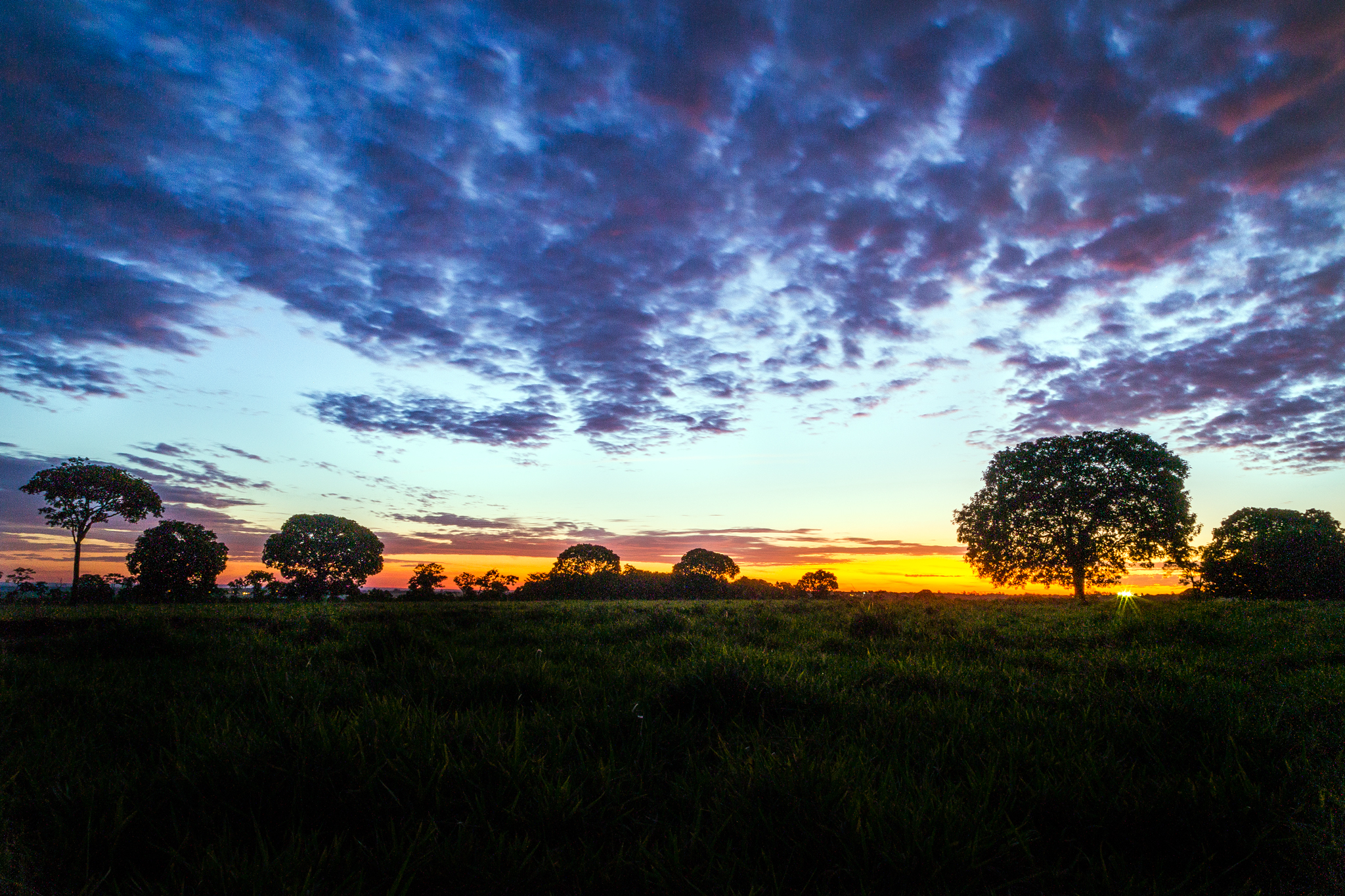
Sunset in Campo Grande.

=== Vegetation ===
The vegetation in Campo Grande and Central Brazil is a tropical savanna called "Cerrado" that varies from pure grassland to a nearly closed canopy of medium height trees overlying grass. Since forest is the expected climax vegetation there, several theories have been given to explain the types of grassland present.

The most promising of these involve differences in soil properties, but only a few sites have been used for evaluation. The 1960s marked the beginning of the expansion of large-scale agriculture across the Cerrado. The state is one of the largest producers of soybeans in the world.

The municipality contains the 178 hectares (440 acres) Matas do Segredo State Park, created in 2000 to protect an area of cerrado forest. and the 135 hectares (330 acres) Prosa State Park, created in 2002.

=== Climate ===
Campo Grande has a tropical savanna climate (Köppen: Aw), just slightly drier than a tropical monsoon climate, with a mild appearance of cold air masses on the southern edge of the tropics. It has semi-humid, hot summers, and notably seasonal, with a dry winter season from June through September, but without major irregularities in the precipitation. Its altitude a few hundred meters higher than in the surrounding swamps and its location in the interior of South America, gives a much more extreme climate than several Brazilian cities, although still moderate. In addition, the flood is one of the problems seen in the city, the result of intense rains that occur in a short period. Annual rainfall averages 1,465 millimetres (57.7 in). January is the warmest and rainiest month, with mean highs of 29 °C (84.2 °F) and lows of 20 °C (68.0 °F).

July brings on sunny days but cooler temperatures, with mean highs of 25 °C (77.0 °F) and lows of 14 °C (57.2 °F). Occasional near-freezing temperatures can occur on winter's coldest nights.

Climate data for Campo Grande (1981–2010)
Month	Jan	Feb	Mar	Apr	May	Jun	Jul	Aug	Sep	Oct	Nov	Dec	Year
Record high °C (°F)	34.6 (94.3)	36.7 (98.1)	35.1 (95.2)	36.4 (97.5)	32.5 (90.5)	31.2 (88.2)	34.0 (93.2)	35.4 (95.7)	41.0 (105.8)	36.6 (97.9)	39.7 (103.5)	37.2 (99.0)	41.0 (105.8)
Mean daily maximum °C (°F)	30.7 (87.3)	30.7 (87.3)	30.6 (87.1)	30.1 (86.2)	27.4 (81.3)	26.9 (80.4)	27.5 (81.5)	29.7 (85.5)	30.6 (87.1)	31.3 (88.3)	30.9 (87.6)	30.6 (87.1)	29.8 (85.6)
Daily mean °C (°F)	25.1 (77.2)	24.8 (76.6)	24.7 (76.5)	23.7 (74.7)	20.9 (69.6)	20.1 (68.2)	20.1 (68.2)	21.9 (71.4)	23.2 (73.8)	24.7 (76.5)	24.9 (76.8)	24.9 (76.8)	23.3 (73.9)
Mean daily minimum °C (°F)	21.2 (70.2)	21.0 (69.8)	20.8 (69.4)	19.4 (66.9)	16.7 (62.1)	15.8 (60.4)	15.3 (59.5)	16.8 (62.2)	18.2 (64.8)	20.0 (68.0)	20.2 (68.4)	20.7 (69.3)	18.8 (65.8)
Record low °C (°F)	12.5 (54.5)	15.1 (59.2)	9.3 (48.7)	7.5 (45.5)	2.0 (35.6)	0.6 (33.1)	2.5 (36.5)	−0.9 (30.4)	2.0 (35.6)	8.8 (47.8)	6.9 (44.4)	14.8 (58.6)	−0.9 (30.4)
Average precipitation mm (inches)	225.4 (8.87)	176.0 (6.93)	149.6 (5.89)	89.4 (3.52)	88.2 (3.47)	47.4 (1.87)	35.7 (1.41)	45.5 (1.79)	77.6 (3.06)	150.6 (5.93)	163.9 (6.45)	206 (8.1)	1,455.3 (57.30)
Average precipitation days (≥ 1.0 mm)	15	13	11	7	5	4	3	3	6	9	10	13	99
Average relative humidity (%)	78.3	79.4	78.3	72.6	71.0	68.6	61.9	54.4	59.8	66.6	70.0	75.6	69.7
Mean monthly sunshine hours	206.1	179.3	210.7	232.0	228.5	219.2	243.4	236.9	187.9	214.0	223.9	218.7	2,600.6
Source: Instituto Nacional de Meteorologia

== Economy ==
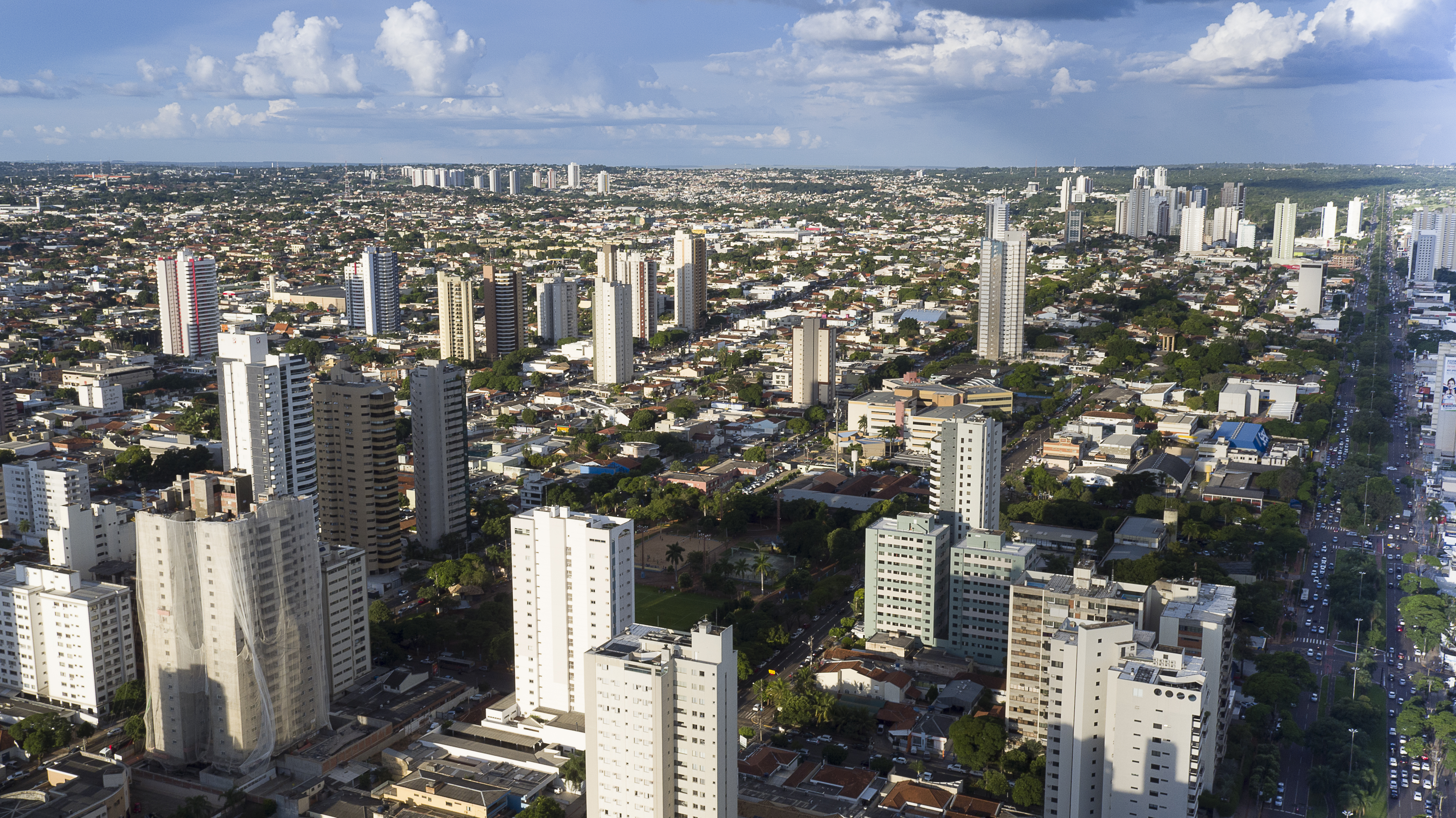
Aerial view of Campo Grande.

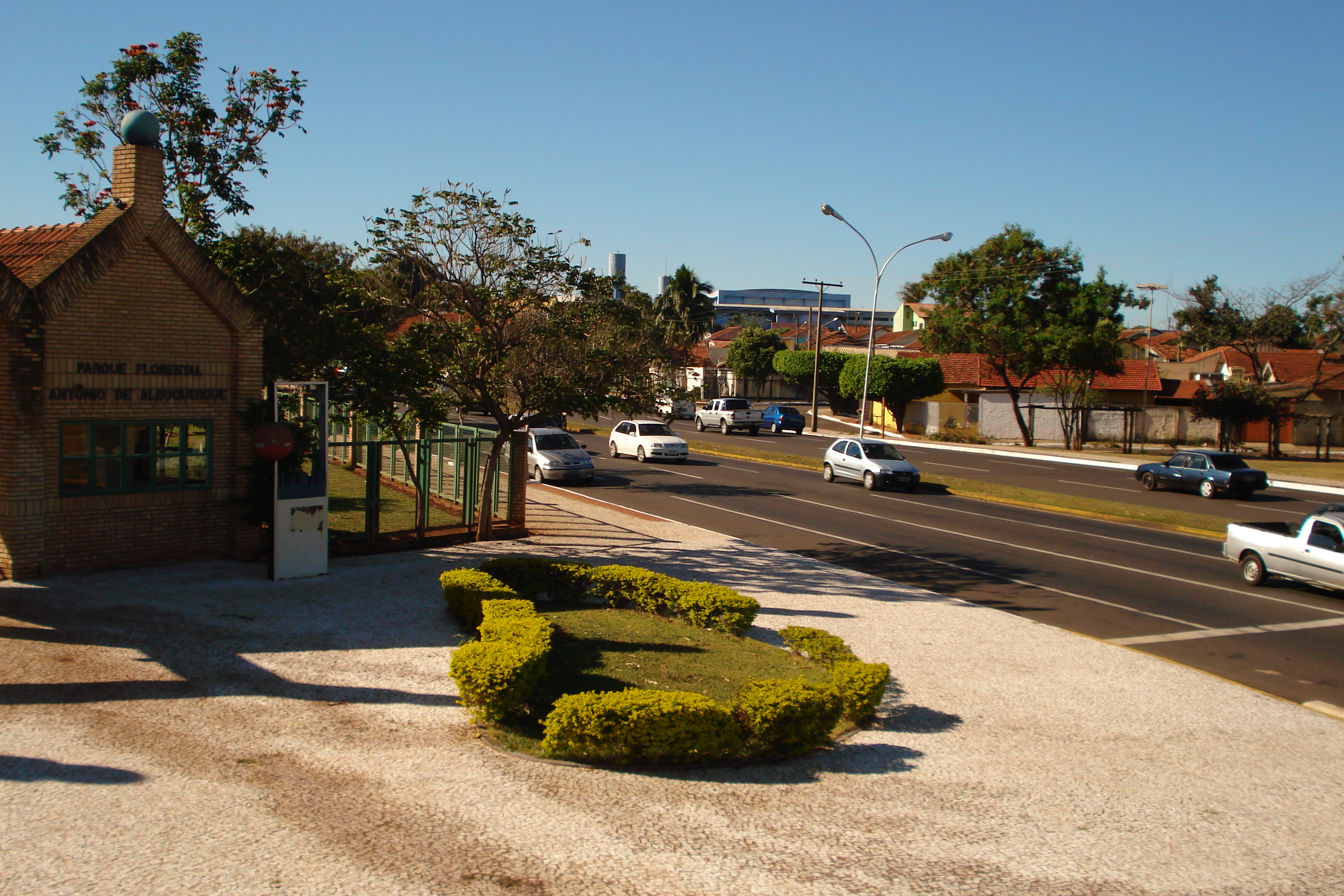
A typical neighborhood in Campo Grande.

Most of the city's active economic labor is absorbed by the tertiary sector (commerce and services). In spite of that, the primary and secondary sectors, especially agribusiness, still play an important role in the local economy. The farming of bovine livestock supplies local slaughterhouses, which in turn allows Campo Grande to export meat to other states in Brazil and abroad. In addition to food processing and agribusiness, construction and non-metallic mineral processing are important. The area's most important crops are soy, rice and manioc. Recently, sugar cane is becoming important as well. According to IBGE, Campo Grande has a total of 11,657 commercial and 1,300 industrial enterprises.

The city's GDP was R$ 20.7 billion (about US$ 9.59 billion) in 2013, ranks as the richest city in the state, the third in the Central-West region of the country, and the 33rd richest in Brazil (2013).

Per capita income was R$24.839 in 2013 (about US$11,511).

== Education ==
Portuguese is the official national language, and thus the primary language taught in schools. But English and Spanish are part of the official high school curriculum.

=== Educational institutions ===
The city has several universities. The most notable ones are:

- Universidade Federal de Mato Grosso do Sul (UFMS) (Federal University of Mato Grosso do Sul);
- Universidade Estadual de Mato Grosso do Sul (UEMS) (State University of Mato Grosso do Sul);
- Universidade Católica Dom Bosco (UCDB) (Dom Bosco Catholic University);
- Faculdade Campo Grande (FCG) (Campo Grande College);
- Centro Universitário de Campo Grande (UNAES) (Academic Center of Campo Grande).
- Universidade para Desenvolvimento do Estado e da Regiao do Pantanal (UNIDERP) (Academic Center of Campo Grande).
- Federal Institute of Mato Grosso do Sul (IFMS) (Institutum Foederale Mato Grosso do Sul)

== Transportation ==
=== International Airport ===
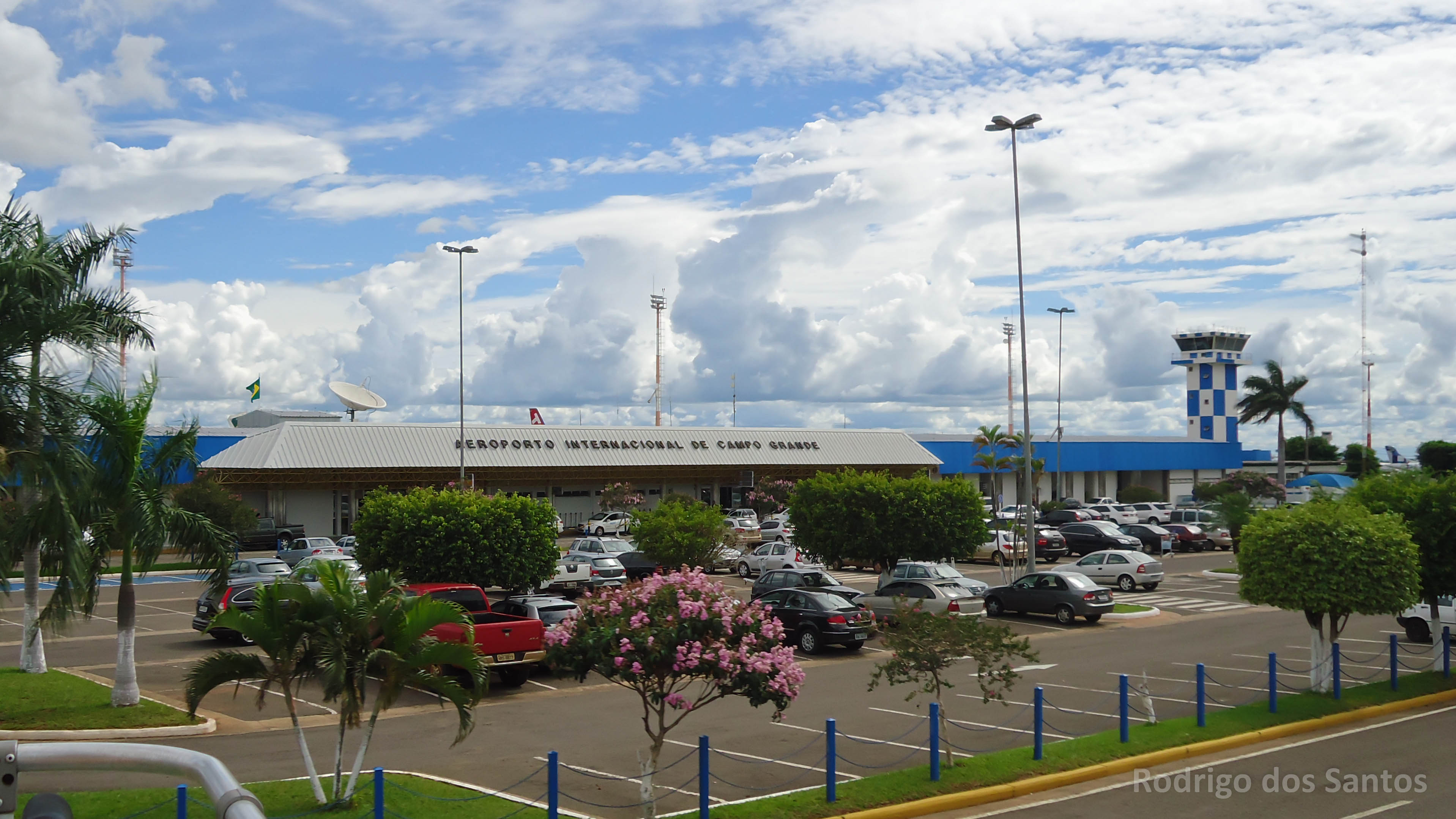
Campo Grande International Airport (CGR).

The operation of Campo Grande International Airport is shared with Campo Grande Air Force Base. The airport has two runways. The airport can receive medium-sized jets such as the Boeing 737 and the Airbus A320, but occasional operations of larger jets have occurred. Operations are mostly domestic, but there are also a few flights to Bolivia and Paraguay.

Campo Grande Air Force Base - ALA5, one of their most important bases of the Brazilian Air Force, is located in Campo Grande.

=== Railroad ===
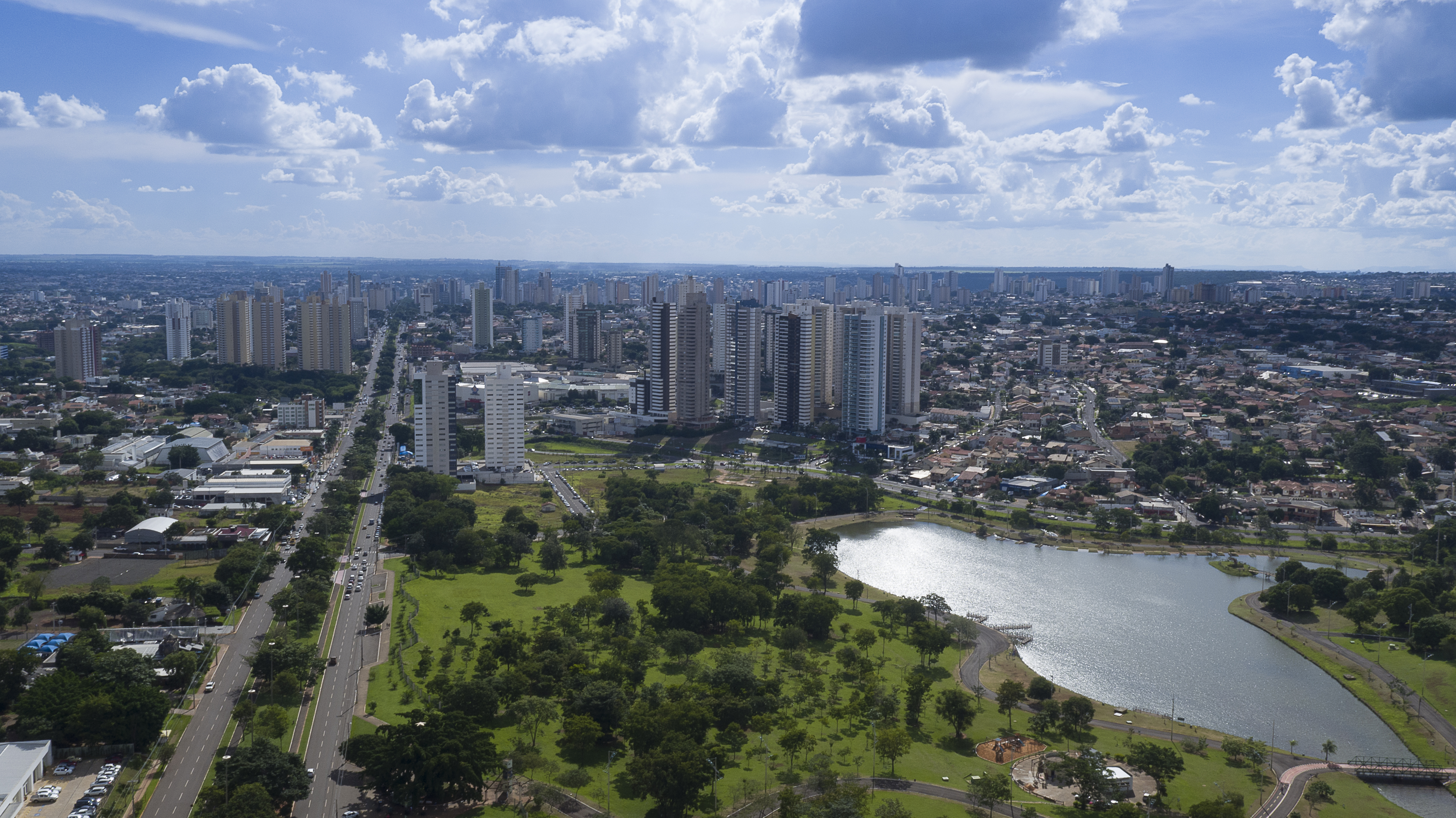
Afonso Pena Avenue.

Campo Grande is served by a system of railway transport under administration of the Novoeste company, interconnecting with other cities in the state, in a line that goes from Bauru and São Paulo state through Campo Grande all the way to Corumbá and on to Bolivia. This mode of transport has had significant effects on the transport infrastructure, allowing the export of products to other centres of production and consumption. Currently, no passenger services are operated, only freight trains.

=== Highways ===
Three main federal highways intersect at Campo Grande. BR-262 links Campo Grande to Corumbá and Bolivia to the west, and the Brazilian State of São Paulo to the east. BR-163 connects Campo Grande to Cuiabá and the Amazon region to the north, and to Dourados (which is 120 kilometres (75 miles) from the Paraguayan border) to the south. BR-060 links Campo Grande to the state of Goiás and the national capital city of Brasília to the northeast. There are also several state highways converging there.

== Culture ==
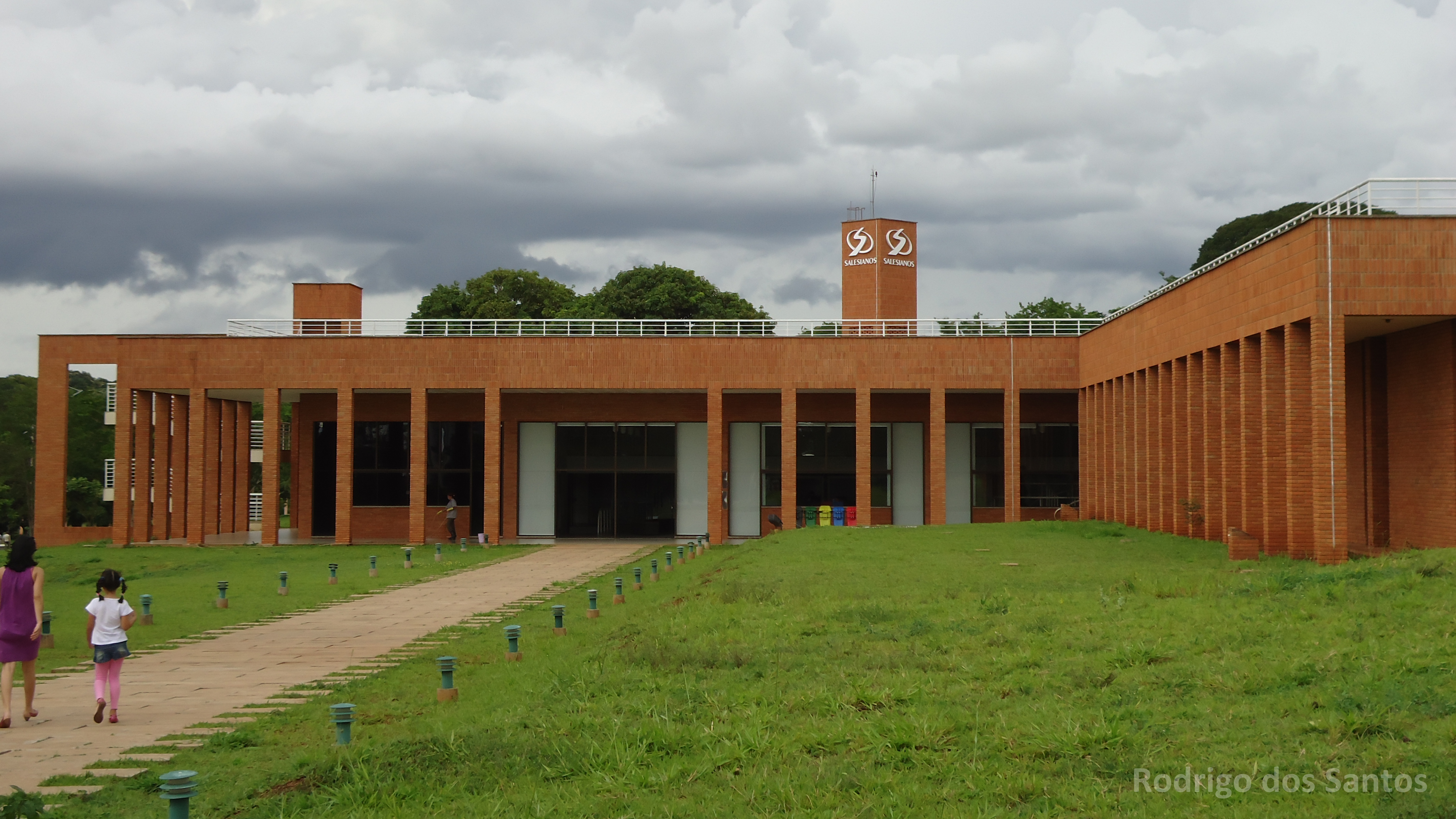
Dom Bosco Museum.

Festas Juninas were introduced to Northeastern Brazil by the Portuguese and the custom spread to the rest of the country, including Campo-Grande, where festivities take place with the usual fare of typical foods and decoration, rural costumes, music, dancing, a bonfire, and fireworks.

The Campo Grande Film Festival is held annually in the months of January and February since 2004. It focuses on independent cinema, presenting Brazilian and foreign films alike, as well as regional and short films.

== Sports ==
=== Car racing ===
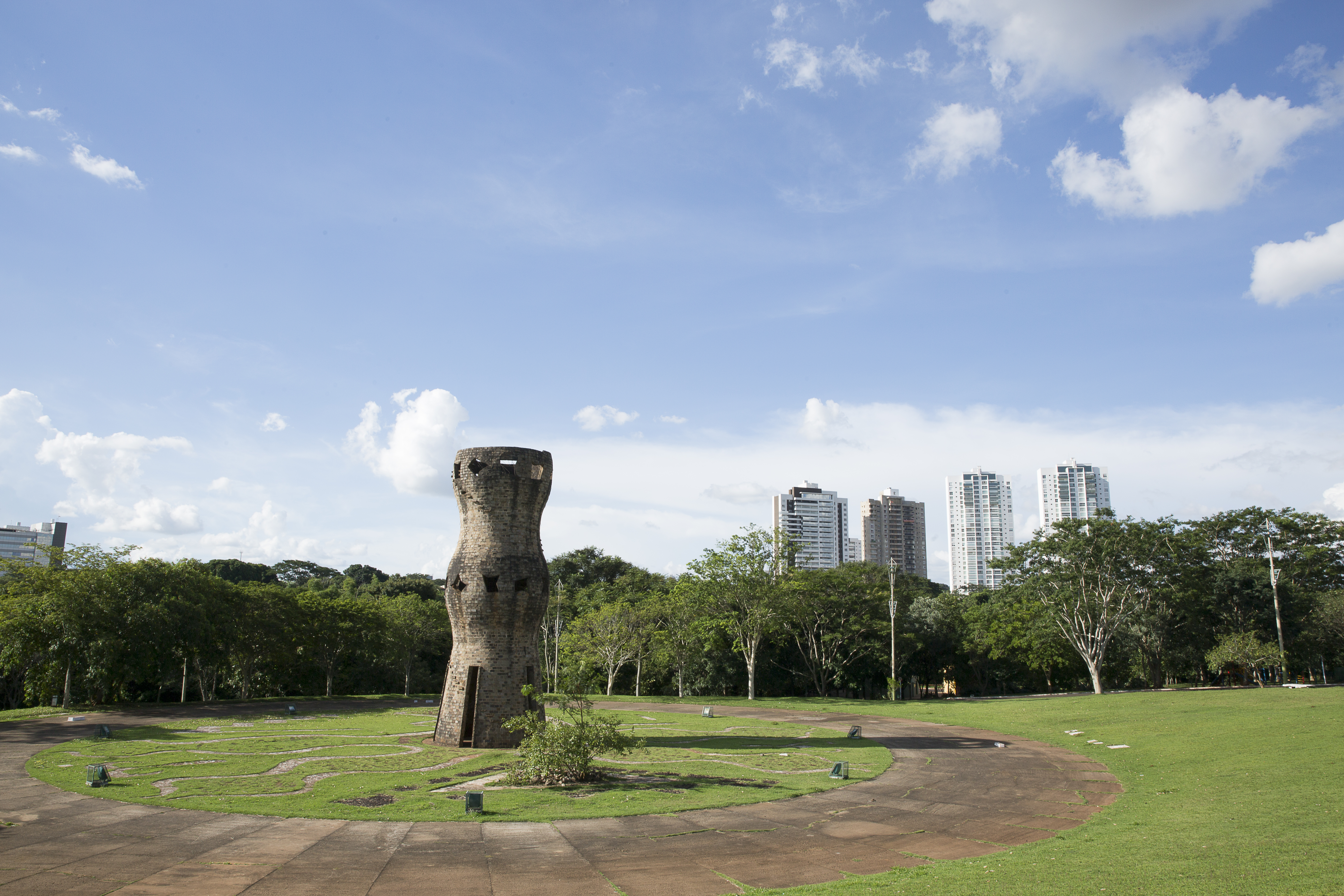
Indigenous peoples park.

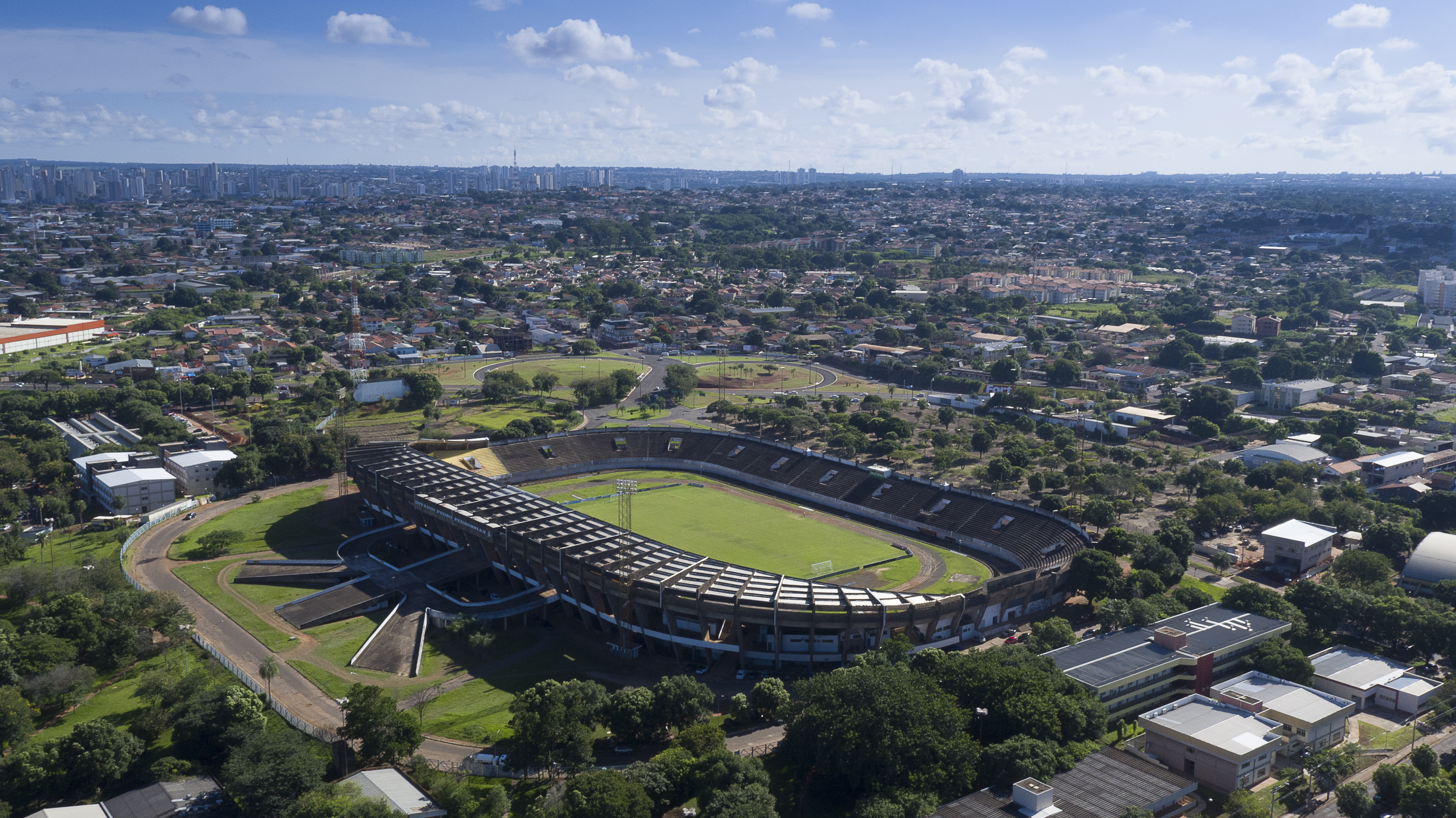
Pedro Pedrossian Stadium.

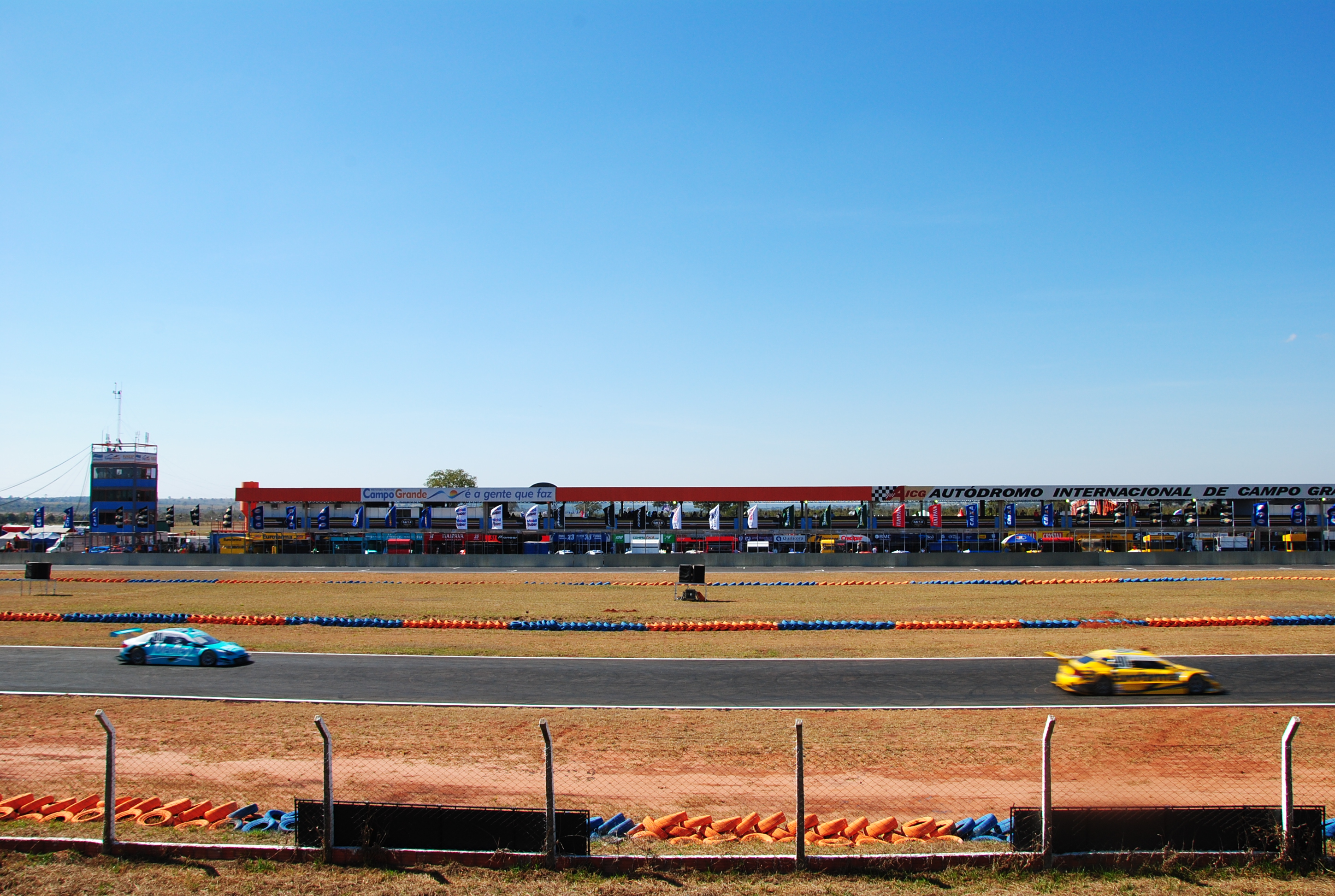
Orlando Moura International Circuit.

The city has a car racing and a kart racing track. Orlando Moura International Autodrome has a 3,433-metre (11,263 ft.) runway, and Kartódromo Ayrton Senna a 930-metre (3,051 ft.) runway.

=== Football ===
As in all of Brazil, the most popular sport in Campo Grande is football. The city has a major football stadium, Estádio Universitário Pedro Pedrossian, popularly known as "Morenão" ("the big brown" in Portuguese, after the city's nickname and the Brazilian custom of often giving names derived of augmentatives to football stadiums). The stadium was opened in 1971 and accommodates up to 45,000 people. There are five other minor stadiums in the city, which occasionally host competition games. The city's main teams are Esporte Clube Comercial and Operário Futebol Clube.

Additionally, there are 45 multisport playing fields in the city, in clubs, cultural associations and public squares.

=== Volta das Nações ===
"Volta das nações" is a mini-marathon of 21 km that takes place at Parque das Nações Indígenas every October, where around 26.4 thousand people participate, including professional athletes from Kenya and other parts of the world.

== Notable people ==
- Rafael Silva, judoka
- Leonardo de Deus, swimmer
- Müller, footballer
- Hoover Orsi (born 1978), racing driver
- Aracy Balabanian (1940–2023), Brazilian actress of Armenian descent

== International relations ==
=== Twin towns – Sister cities ===
Campo Grande is twinned with:

- Pedro Juan Caballero, Amambay Department, Paraguay
- Turin, Piedmont, Italy
