= Campo Grande Air Force Base =

Air base of the Brazilian Air Force

- Base Aérea de Campo Grande
- Campo Grande, Mato Grosso do Sul in Brazil
- Dedication of the Base on 19 April 1945

Site information
- Type: Air Force Base
- Code: ALA5
- Owner: Brazilian Air Force
- Controlled by: Brazilian Air Force
- Open to the public: No
- Website: www.fab.mil.br/organizacoes/mostra/479

Location
- Location in Brazil
- Coordinates: 20°28′10″S 054°40′13″W

Site history
- Built: 1932
- In use: 1941-present

Garrison information
- Current commander: Cel. Av. Luiz Cláudio Macedo Santos
- Occupants: 2nd Squadron of the 10th Transportation Group; 1st Squadron of the 15th Transportation Group; 3rd Squadron of the 3rd Aviation Group; 3rd Aviation Battalion of the Brazilian Army

Airfield information
- Identifiers: IATA: CGR, ICAO: SBCG, LID: MS0001
- Elevation: 559 metres (1,834 ft) AMSL
Runways
Direction	Length and surface
06/24	2,600 metres (8,530 ft) Asphalt

Base Aérea de Campo Grande – ALA5 (IATA: CGR, ICAO: SBCG) is a base of the Brazilian Air Force, located in Campo Grande, Brazil.

It shares some facilities with Campo Grande International Airport.

== History ==
Campo Grande Air Force Base has its origins on the Aviation Detachment created on 23 January 1934. However, it was on 22 May 1941 that Campo Grande Air Force Base was effectively created by Decree 3,302.

== Units ==
The following units are based at Campo Grande Air Force Base:

- 2nd Squadron of the 10th Aviation Group (2°/10°GAv) Pelicano, using the C-105A Amazonas.
- 1st Squadron of the 15th Aviation Group (1°/15°GAv) Onça, using the C-105A Amazonas.
- 3rd Squadron of the 3rd Aviation Group (3°/3°GAv) Flecha, using the A-29A & B Super Tucano.
- 3rd Aviation Battalion of the Brazilian Army (3° BAvEx) Pantera, using HA-1 Fennec, HM-1 Pantera, and HM-3 Cougar.

== Access ==
The base is located 7 km from downtown Campo Grande.

== Gallery ==
This gallery displays aircraft that are or have been based at Campo Grande. The gallery is not comprehensive.

=== Present aircraft ===
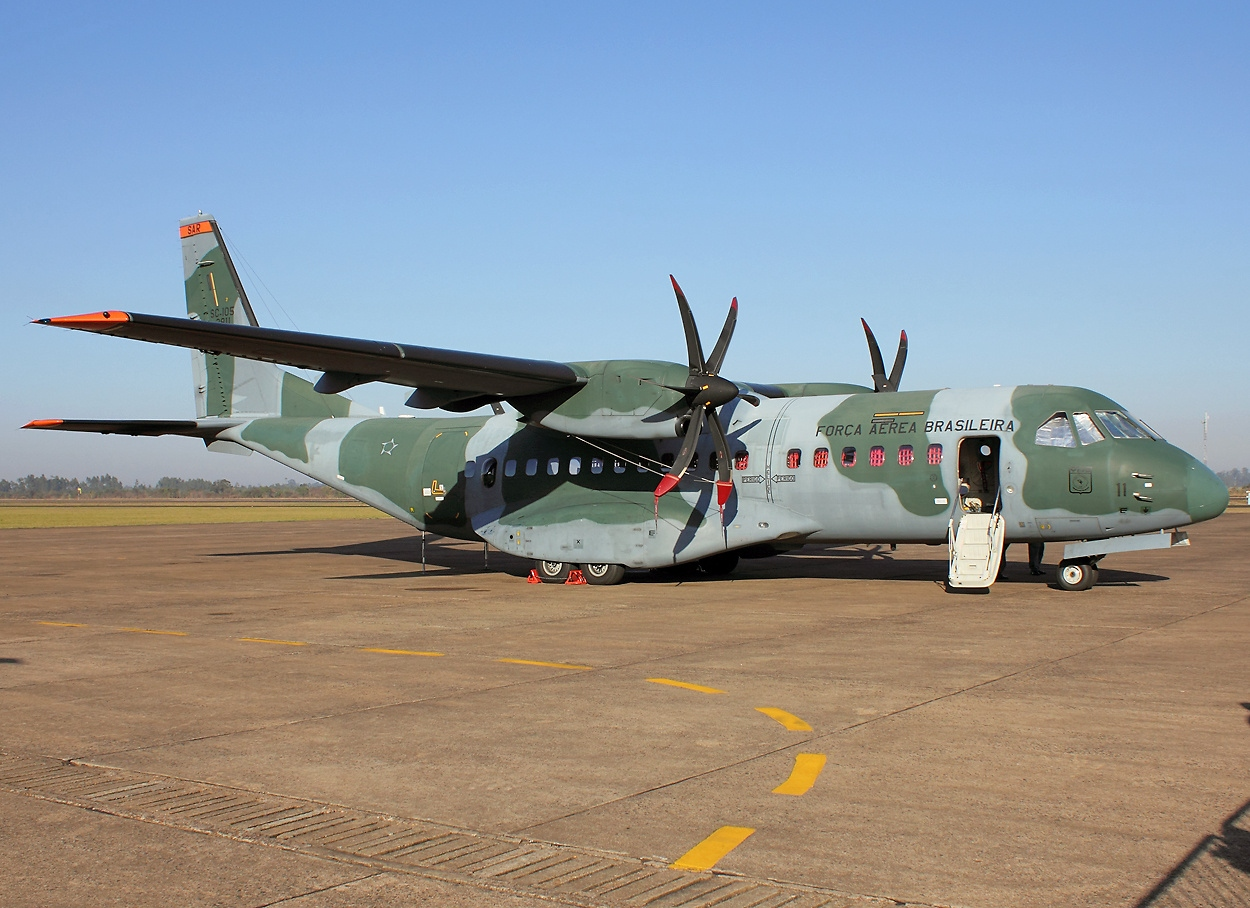
CASA C-105A Amazonas

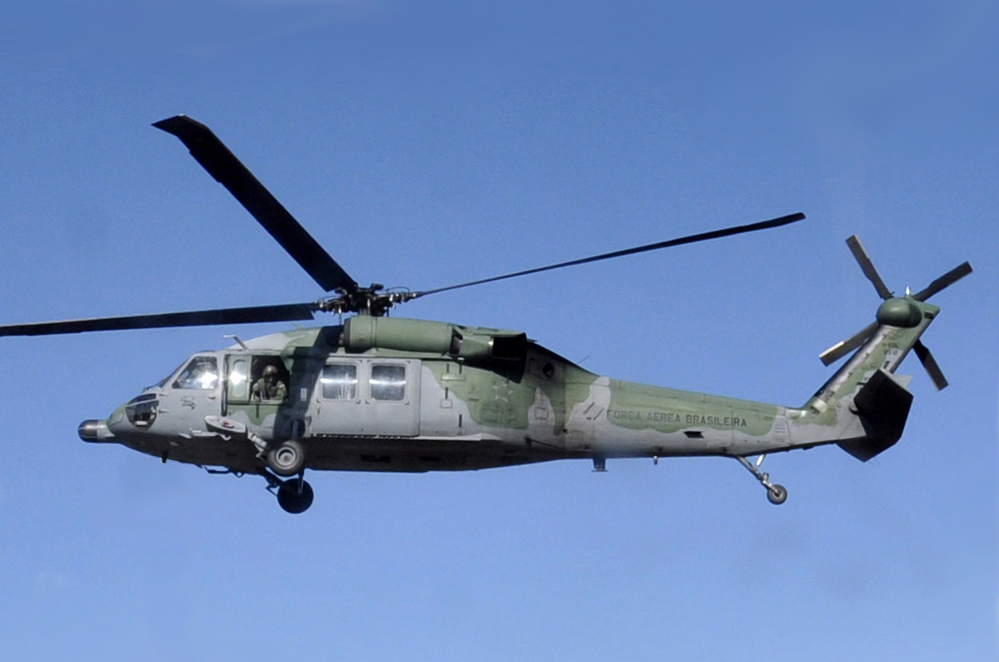
Sikorsky H-60L Black Hawk

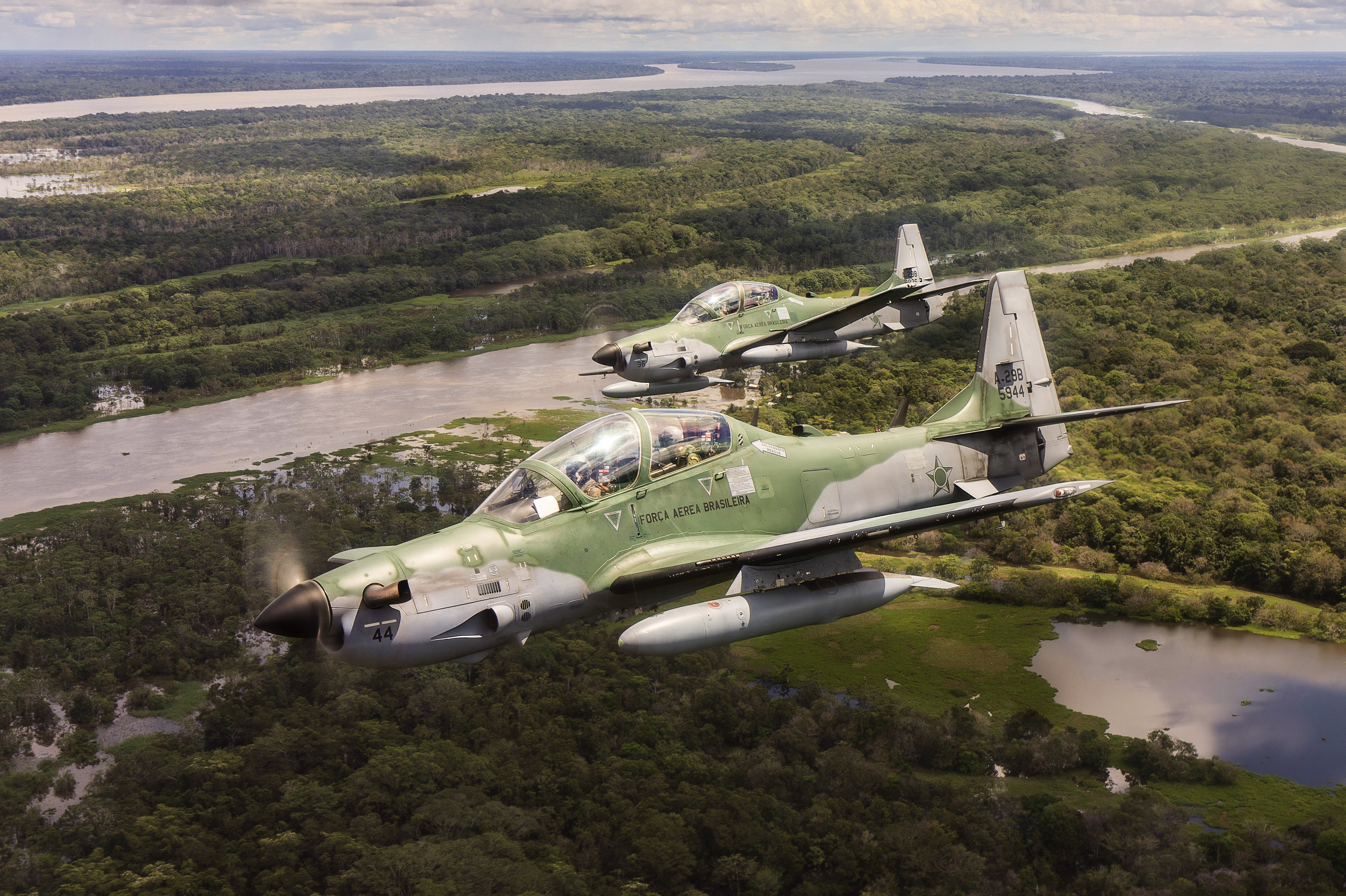
Embraer A-29A Super Tucano

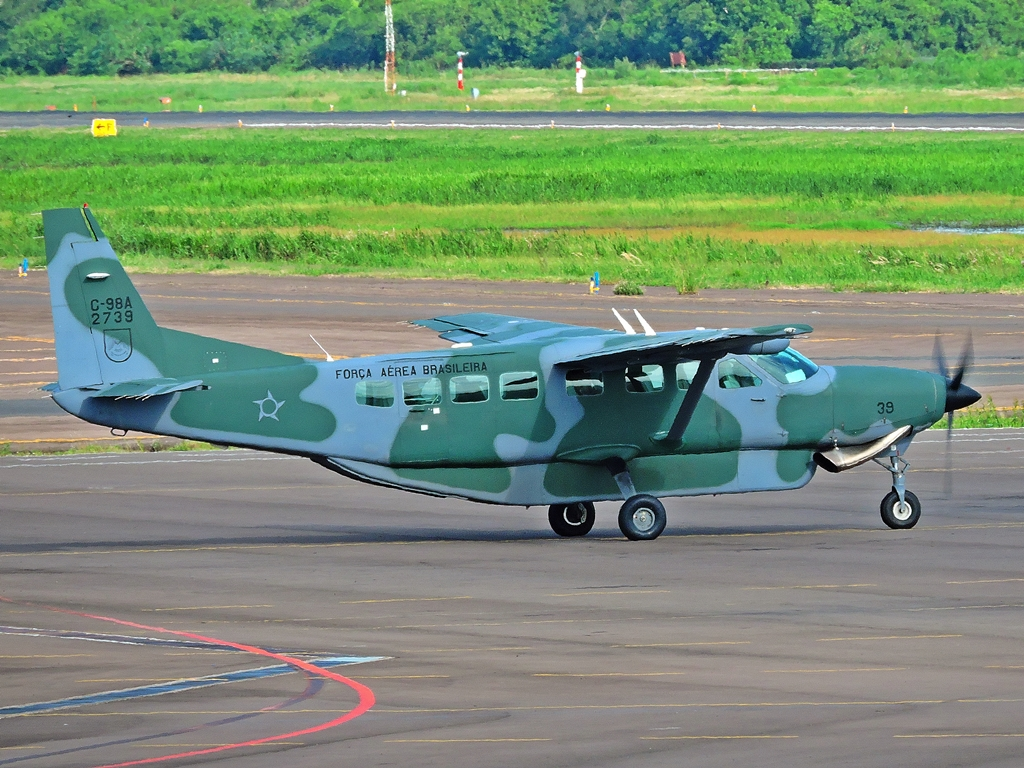
Cessna C-98A Caravan

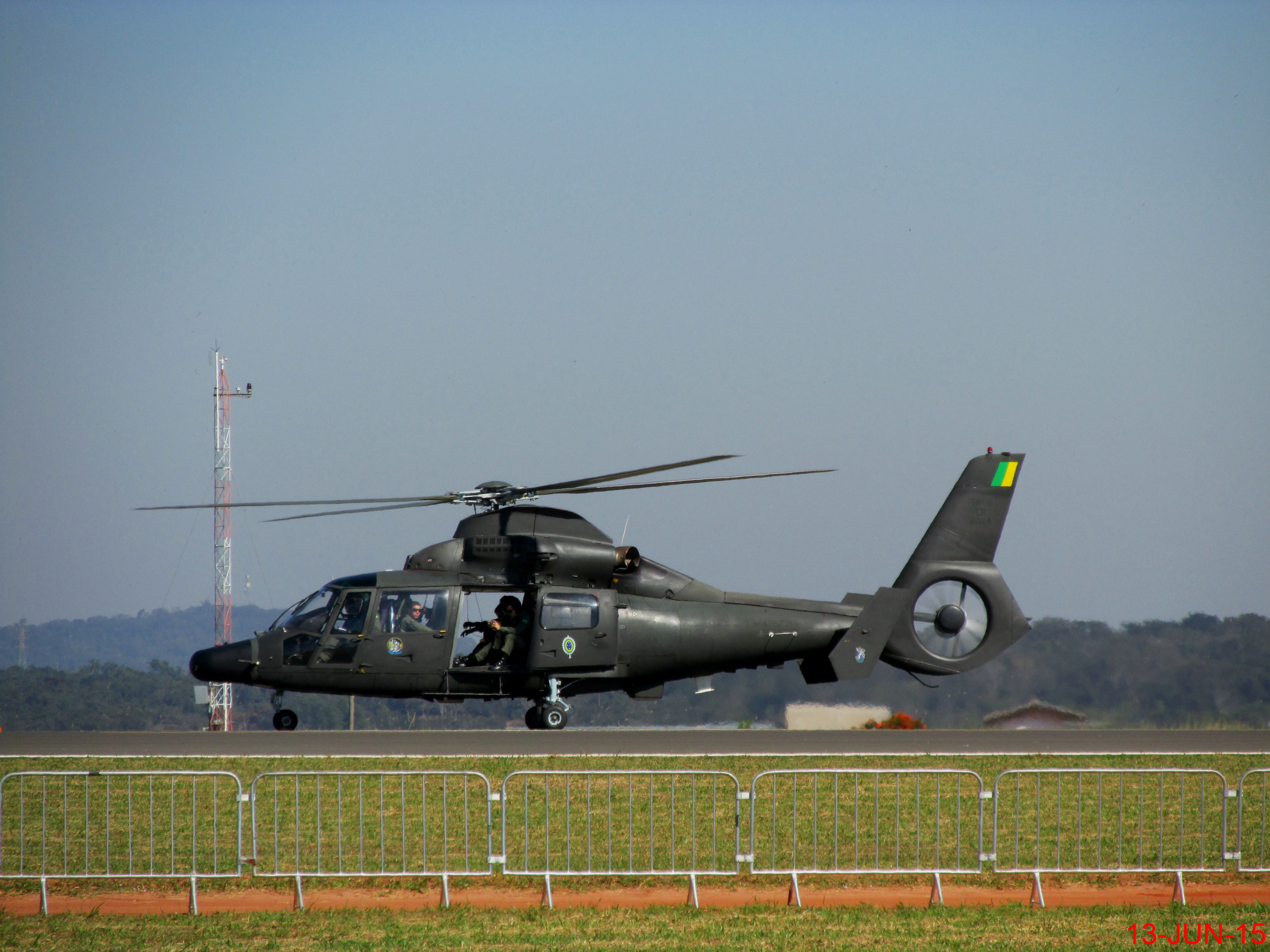
Eurocopter HM-1 Pantera (Army)

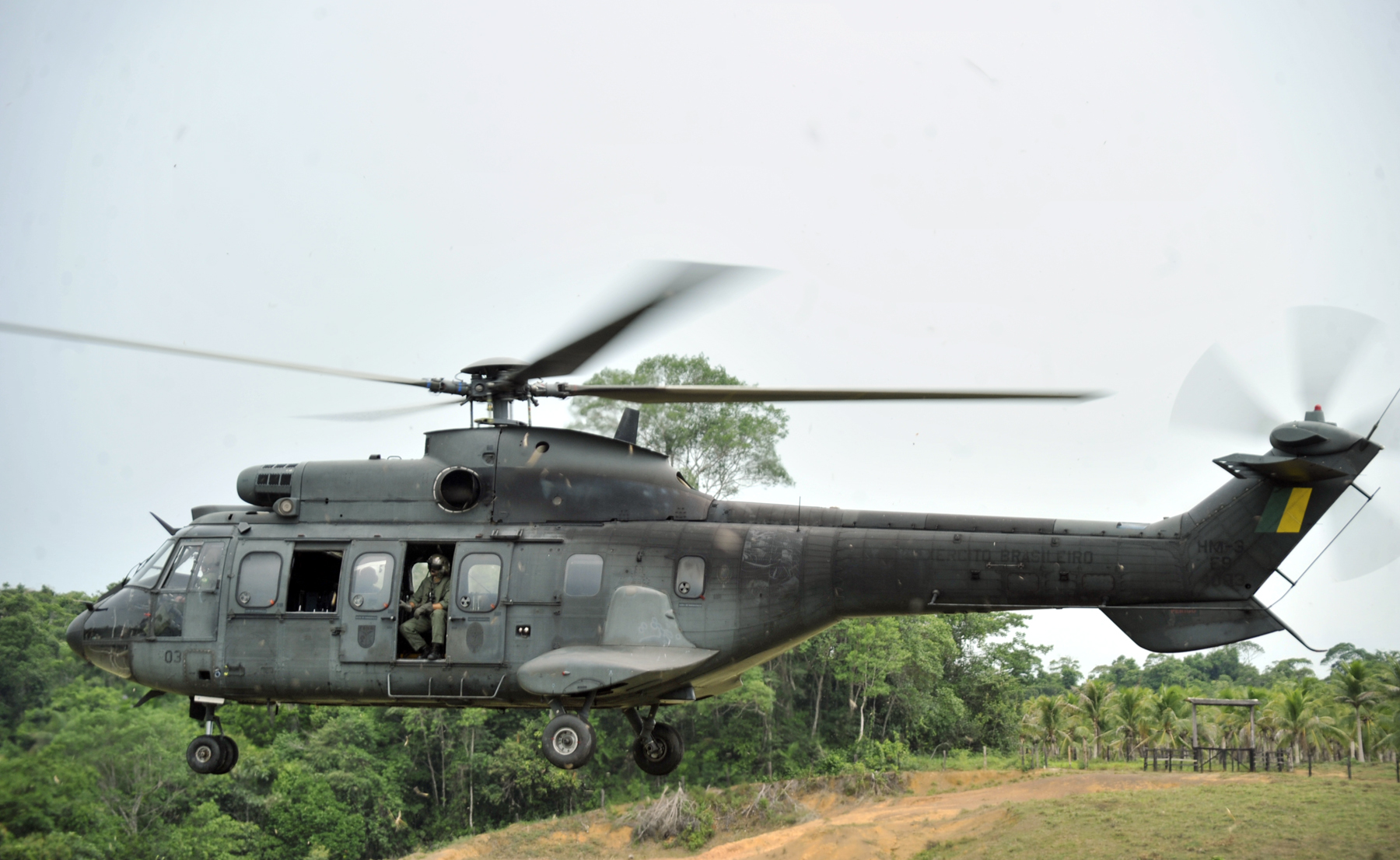
Eurocopter HM-3 Cougar (Army)

=== Retired aircraft ===
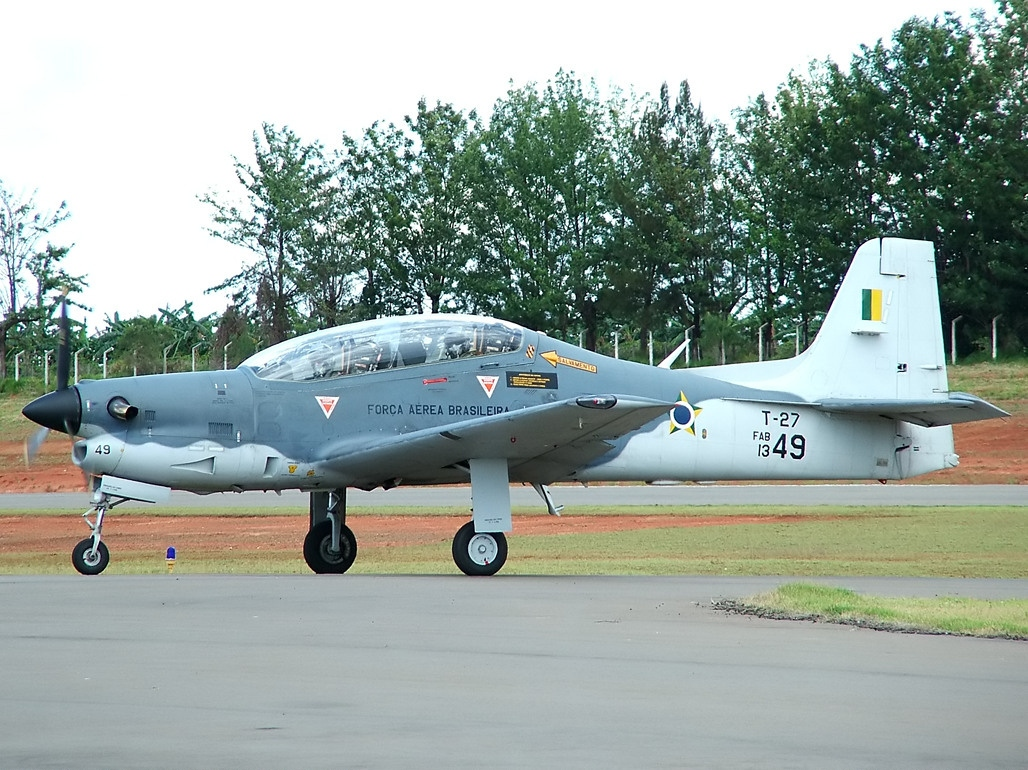
Embraer T-27 Tucano

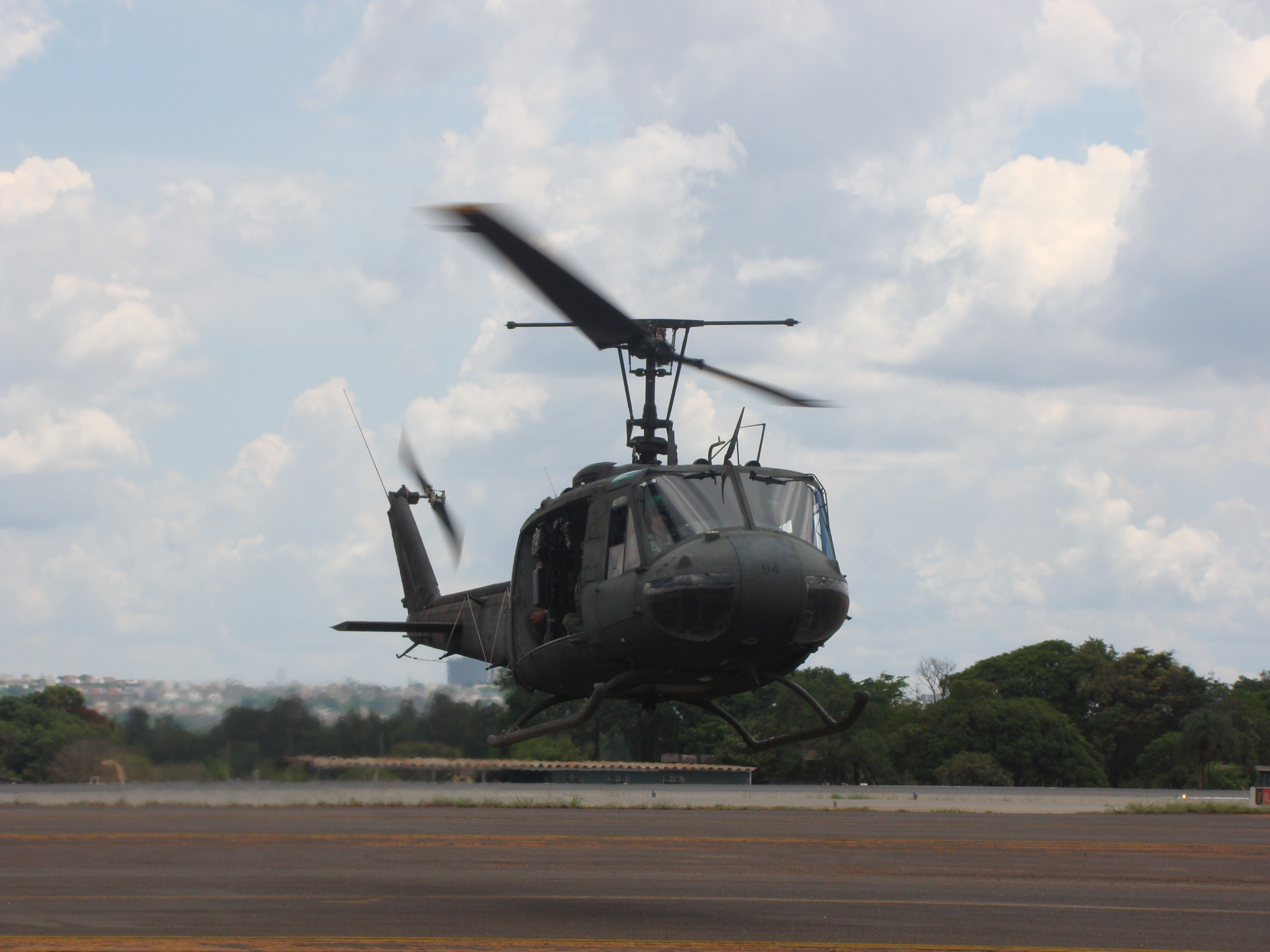
Bell H-1H Iroquois

de Havilland C-115 Buffalo

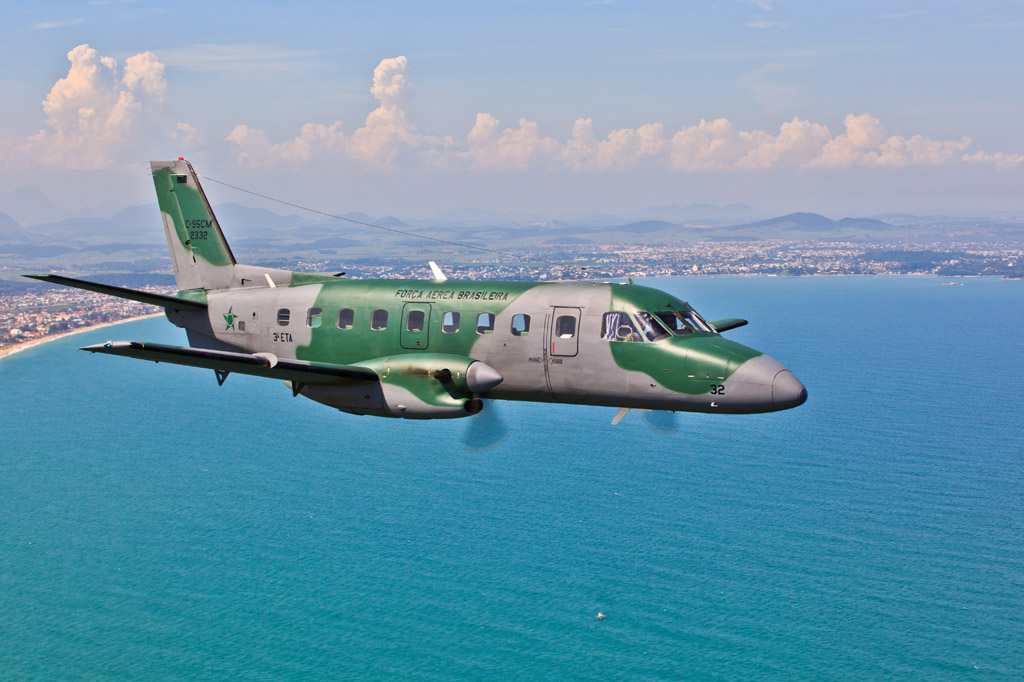
Embraer C-95B Bandeirante

== See also ==
- List of Brazilian military bases
- Campo Grande International Airport
