= Federal Institute Baiano =

Brazilian federal institute for education

Instituto Federal de Educação, Ciência e Tecnologia Baiano
- Type: Public university
- Established: 2 June 1910, transformed to IFBA on 2008
- Rector: Sebastião Edson Moura
- Location: Salvador, Bahia, Brazil
- Campus: Urban
- Website: www.ifbaiano.edu.br

The Instituto Federal de Educação, Ciência e Tecnologia Baiano (IFBAIANO) is an institution that offers high and professional educations by having a pluricurricular form. It is an multicampi institution, especialized in offering professional and technological education in different areas of knowledge (biologics/human sciences/exact sciences).

The Instituto Federal de Educação, Ciência e Tecnologia Baiano is a federal institution, public, directly vinculated to the Ministry of Education of Brazil, and was created by the law 11.892 of 2008. The main campus is in Salvador.
