= Instituto Federal do Acre =

Public university in Brazil

Instituto Federal de Educação, Ciência e Tecnologia do Acre
- Type: Public university
- Established: 29 December 2008
- Rector: Rosana Cavalcante dos Santos
- Location: Rio Branco, Acre, Brazil
- Campus: Urban
- Website: portal.ifac.edu.br

The Instituto Federal de Educação, Ciência e Tecnologia do Acre (IFAC) (Acre Federal Institute of Education, Science and Technology) is an institution that offers high and professional educations by having a pluricurricular form. It is a multicampus institution, specializing in professional and technological education in different areas of knowledge (biologics/human sciences/exact sciences).

The Instituto Federal de Educação, Ciência e Tecnologia do Acre (IFAC) (Acre Federal Institute of Education, Science and Technology) is a federal institution, public, directly vinculated to the Ministry of Education of Brazil.

The IFAC is a public university located in the cities of Rio Branco, Cruzeiro do Sul, Sena Madureira, Xapuri and Tarauacá.

== History ==
The IFAC was created by law 11.892, on December 29, 2008 with transformation of the Federal Technical School of Acre in high education Instituicion.

== Undergraduate programs ==
- Biology
- Bachelor of Business Administration
- Chemistry
- Physics
- Mathematics
- Technology in Agribusiness
- Technology in Agroecology
- Technology in Environmental management
- Technology in Information Systems
- Technology in Logistics
- Technology in School Processes
- Zootechnics

== Master Programs ==
Professional and Technology Education

== Admissions ==
The selection of students for higher education is done via SISU. To access the vacancies it is necessary to have completed High School and ENEM.

== See also ==
- Federal University of Acre
