= Caja de Guadalajara =

Former Spanish savings bank

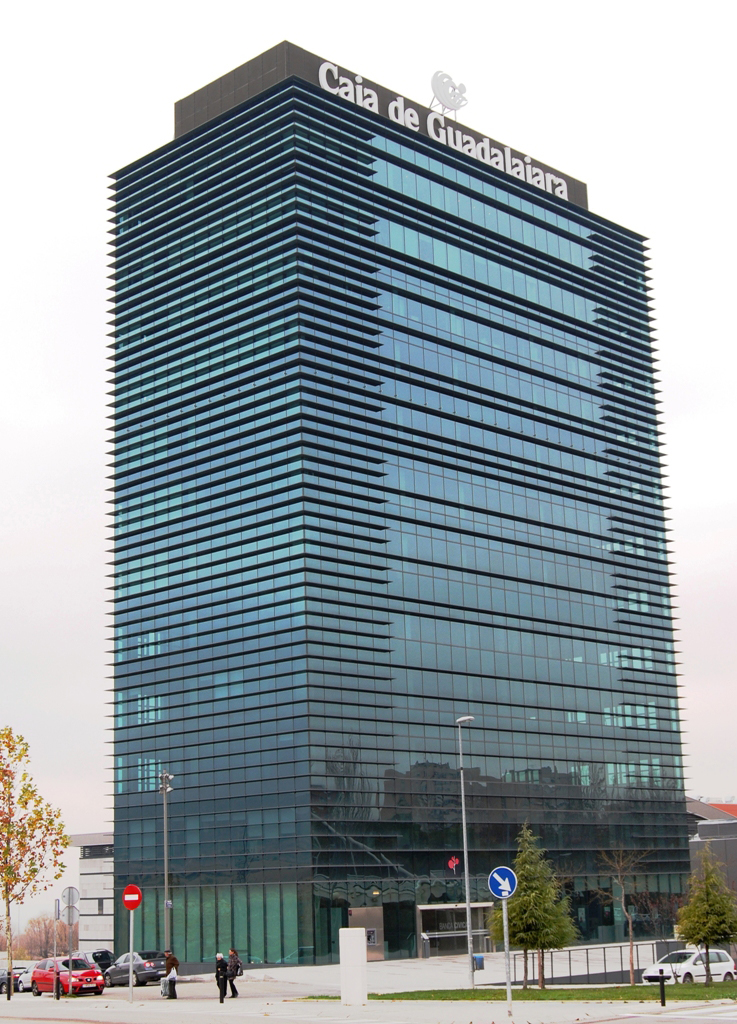
- Torre Caja de Guadalajara, former headquarters of the entity.
- Native name: Caja de Ahorro Provincial de Guadalajara
- Type: Savings bank
- Industry: Financial services
- Founded: 1964
- Founder: Guadalajara Provincial Council
- Defunct: 2010
- Headquarters: Av. Eduardo Guitián, 11 19002 Guadalajara, Bandera de España España, Guadalajara, Spain, Spain
- Key people: José Luis Ros
- Net income: (678.000 euros (2009))
- Total assets: (1,755 million euros (2009))
- Number of employees: (310 (February 2009))

Caja de Ahorro Provincial de Guadalajara was a Spanish savings bank headquartered in Guadalajara that operated in that province and Madrid under the trade name Caja de Guadalajara. In 2010 it had 73 branches.

It was founded in 1964 and disappeared in 2010, when it was absorbed by Cajasol, a savings bank that subsequently integrated its banking business into the Banca Cívica institutional protection system. In turn, Banca Cívica disappeared in 2012 when it was acquired by CaixaBank. After the absorption of Caja de Guadalajara by Fundación Cajasol, the "Caja de Guadalajara" trademark remained in the hands of the latter and continued to be used in the former branches in the province of Guadalajara by the entities that successively acquired its banking business: first Cajasol, then Banca Cívica and definitely CaixaBank, which adopted it in 2012 and continued to use it, together with the CaixaBank logo, in the branches originating from the former savings bank located in the province of Guadalajara. On October 10, 2016, the brand was replaced by "CaixaBank".

== History ==
=== Early years ===
Caja de Ahorro Provincial de Guadalajara was founded by the Provincial Council of Guadalajara on September 23, 1964, at the initiative of the president of the council, Antonio Gil Peiró. Since its foundation, its business area has been based on agriculture in the province and cooperatives, also having, as a savings bank, its social and cultural work for the promotion of the province.

When Caja Castilla-La Mancha (CCM) was created in 1992 through the merger of the savings banks of Albacete, Cuenca, Ciudad Real and Toledo, the Caja de Guadalajara refused to join, leaving only two savings banks based in this autonomous community and under the protectorate of the Junta of Communities of Castilla–La Mancha. It was interpreted that the Caja de Guadalajara refused to join the new savings bank for political reasons.

=== Absorption by Cajasol ===
During 2009, at the same time as the crisis of Caja Castilla-La Mancha and its subsequent intervention by the Bank of Spain, there was speculation about the merger of Caja de Guadalajara with Unicaja. However, it was not with Unicaja, but with the also Andalusian Cajasol, with whom Caja de Guadalajara began a merger process in November 2009, which was the first merger process carried out between savings banks from different autonomous communities. According to the auditor PriceWaterhouseCoopers, at the time of the takeover, Caja de Guadalajara was not economically viable, as it would have been in losses. According to the auditor, only the merger with Cajasol would guarantee the economic and financial viability of the entity.

The final agreement, which took the form of the absorption of the Castilian-La Mancha savings bank by the Andalusian one, was approved by the boards of directors of both entities in January 2010. After the mandatory authorization by the Andalusian and Castilian-La Mancha regional administrations and the Bank of Spain, the absorption culminated on October 5, 2010, with the creation of the governing bodies of the new entity. The agreement foresaw that the branches of the new entity (both those of Caja de Guadalajara and those coming from Cajasol) in Castilla-La Mancha would take the brand name "Caja de Guadalajara", as well as the creation of a foundation for the management of the social work coming from Caja de Guadalajara, which would belong to Fundación Cajasol and would take the name Fundación Privada Caja de Ahorro Provincial de Guadalajara. The general assembly of the new entity had 174 general directors, 160 from Cajasol and 14 from Caja de Guadalajara. The board of directors had 22 members, 20 from Cajasol and two from Caja de Guadalajara (among them, José Luis Ros, president of Caja de Guadalajara, was appointed fifth vice-president of the new entity).

In December 2010, Cajasol was integrated into the Institutional Protection System (IPS) that Caja Navarra, Caja de Burgos and Caja Canarias had created months earlier under the name Banca Cívica. The integration agreement provided that the brands of the member savings banks (including "Caja de Guadalajara", owned by Cajasol) would remain in their possession, but would be transferred to Banca Cívica for use in the banking business. This new entity, however, was not able to survive as an independent entity. It first went public and, finally, on August 3, 2012, Banca Cívica was absorbed by CaixaBank, which took over its banking business. Due to the small percentage of CaixaBank's capital that they held, the savings banks that created the IPS Banca Cívica had to become special foundations. In the case of Cajasol, the commitment to create Fundación Caja de Guadalajara before it became a special foundation was not fulfilled, leaving the social work of the former Caja de Guadalajara up in the air.

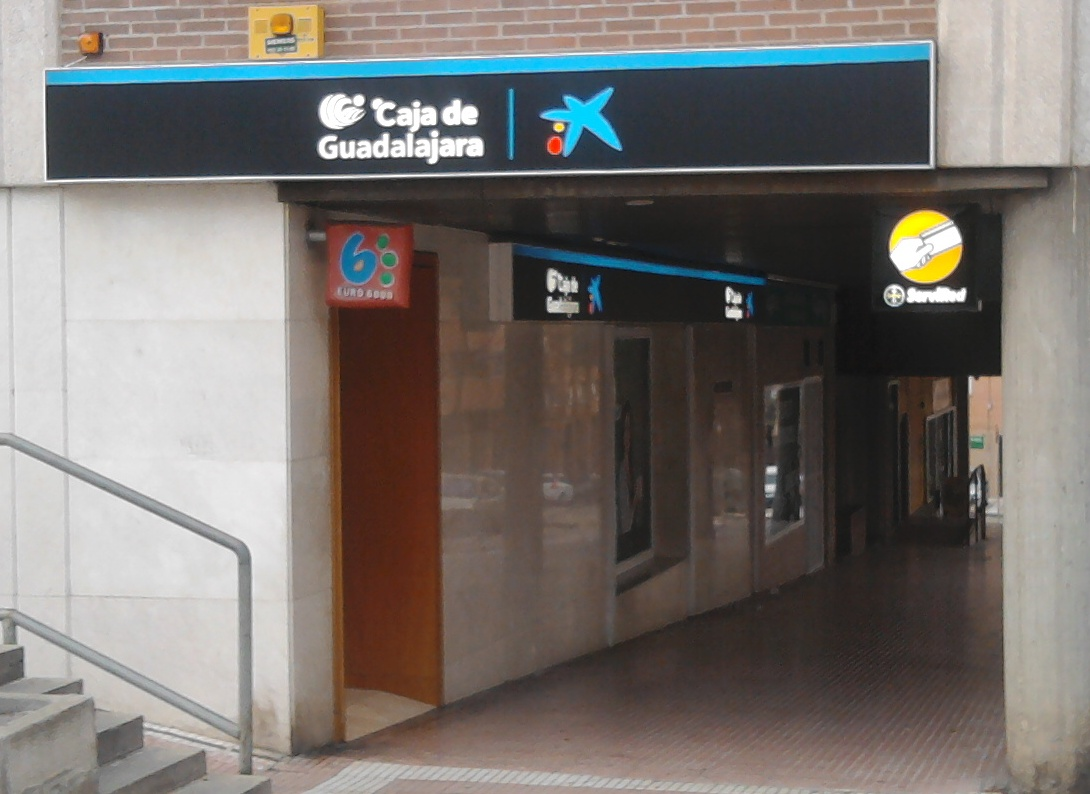
Caja de Guadalajara urban branch 11 at 6 Julián Besteiro street in Guadalajara. It shows the corporate colors of La Caixa/CaixaBank and the brand "Caja de Guadalajara" next to the logo of La Caixa/CaixaBank.

As part of the integration agreement between CaixaBank and Banca Cívica, the savings banks that created the latter agreed that, although the brands of the savings banks that were shareholders of Banca Cívica would continue to be owned by said savings banks, CaixaBank could use, during the term of the shareholders' agreement (4 years), "in the branches coming from Banca Cívica that are located in the territories of origin of each of the savings banks, the brand of the corresponding savings bank together with the CaixaBank and la Caixa logo, thus contributing to the maintenance and development of customer loyalty". In this way, CaixaBank maintained the brand "Caja de Guadalajara" in the branches coming from Banca Cívica in the province of Guadalajara, "due to its roots, history, significance, contribution and penetration in the province of Guadalajara", as it did with the brands "CajaCanarias", "Caja Navarra (can)", "Caja de Burgos" and "Cajasol". In December 2012, the integration of both the technological platform and the operations of Caja de Guadalajara into CaixaBank was completed. The accounts of the former Caja de Guadalajara's customers adopted CaixaBank's numbering.

In October 2016, CaixaBank stopped using the "Caja de Guadalajara" brand after replacing it with the "CaixaBank" brand.

== Social Work ==
In the Protocol of Bases for the Integration of Banca Cívica by CaixaBank, the commitments for the maintenance of the Obra Social de Caja de Guadalajara were established. This would have meant that during the fiscal years 2011, 2012 and 2013 the Cajasol Foundation should have contributed at least 3,865,090 euros to the Caja de Guadalajara Foundation, which finally was not constituted.

== See also ==
- List of banks in Spain

== Bibliography ==
- Caixabank, Banca Cívica (2012), Acuerdo de integración entre Caixabank, S.A. y Banca Cívica, S.A. (PDF) (in Spanish), archived from the original on November 30, 2023
- Cañabate Pozo, Rosario (2004), La fusión de cajas de ahorros (Thesis) (in Spanish), Universidad de Almería, ISBN 8482407325, archived from the original on February 5, 2013
- González Sánchez, Rocío (2011), "La reestructuración del sistema bancario español y su gestión del conocimiento relación entre la capacidad de absorción y la creación de valor", Boletín económico de ICE, Información Comercial Española (in Spanish), vol. 3012, pp. 33–42, ISSN 0214-8307
