= Caja de Burgos =

Spanish bank

Coordinates: 42°20′31″N 3°41′58″W

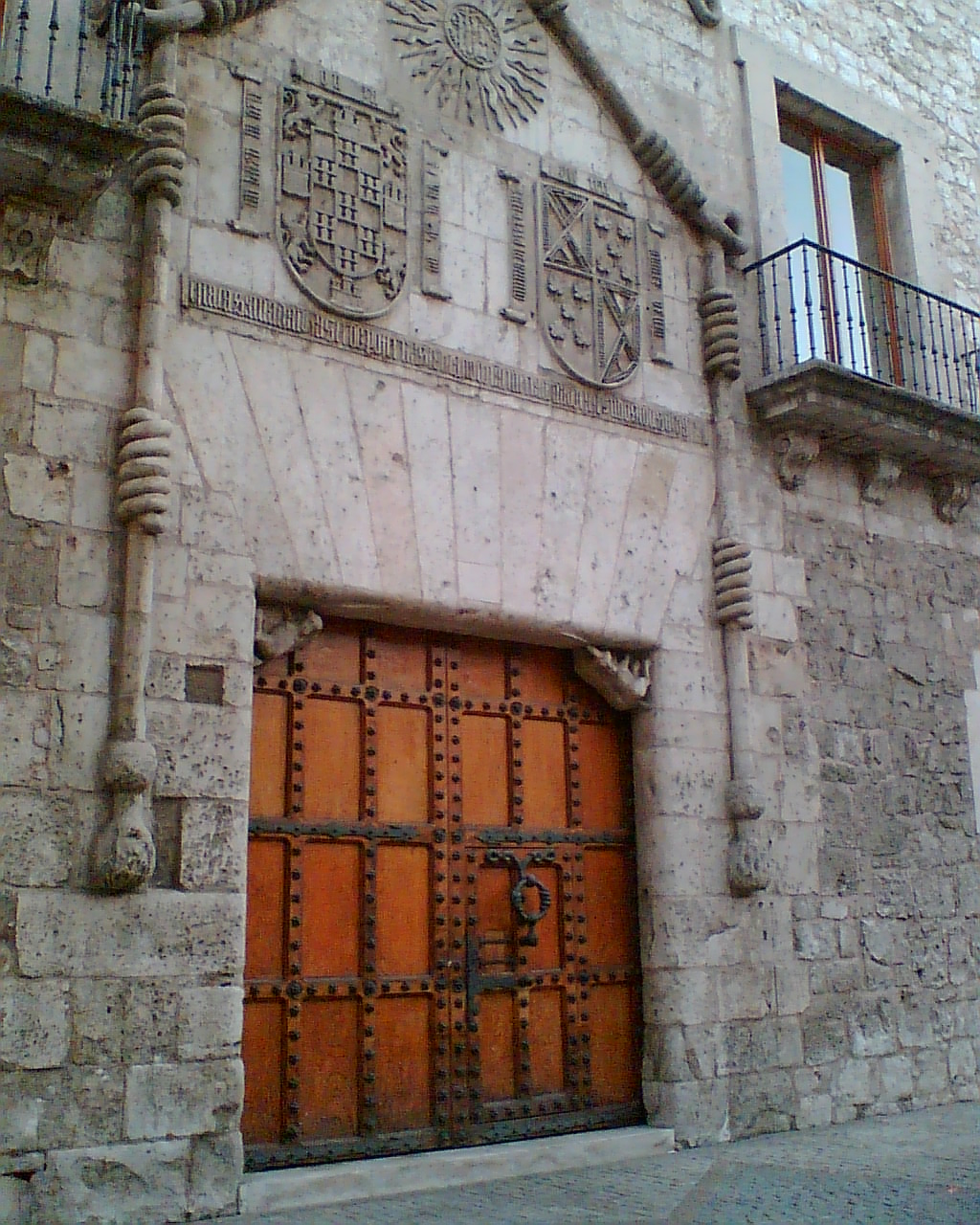
- Company type: 1926-2013: Caja de Ahorros; 2013-Nowadays: Foundation (nonprofit)
- Industry: Banking
- Founded: 1926
- Headquarters: Burgos, Spain
- Products: Financial services
- Website: https://www.cajadeburgos.com/

Caja de Burgos was a medium-sized savings bank, and currently a banking foundation, based in the Province of Burgos in northern Spain with headquarters in Burgos city. As a savings bank, it was also known by Caja de Ahorros Municipal de Burgos.

In 2010, as a result of the European debt crisis, it was merged with Caja Canarias, Cajasol and Caja Navarra, and incorporated as a bank by means of a new notarial instrument, forming Banca Civica. In 2012, it was subsequently absorbed by CaixaBank.

Starting in 2013, the charity part of the savings bank was established as a non-profit foundation, dedicated to support the cultural heritage and social activities eventually maintained by the bank. Its charity activities included giving the award "Excellent Youth" (Jóvenes Excelentes) starting in 2006.

== See also ==
- Banca Civica
- CaixaBank
- List of banks in Spain
