= World Savings and Retail Banks Institute =

Organization in Brussels, Belgium

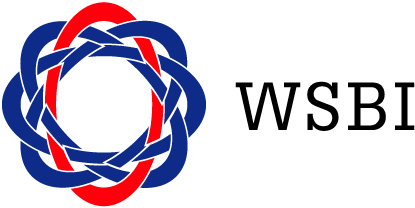
- Abbreviation: WSBI
- Formation: 1924; 102 years ago
- Founder: Banks at the first International Thrift Congress in Milan
- Founded at: Milan, Italy
- Type: Nonprofit
- Legal status: Trade association
- Location: Brussels, Belgium
- Region served: Worldwide
- Members: 99 (2026)
- Official language: English
- President: Isidre Fainé, chairman of La Caixa
- Affiliations: European Savings and Retail Banks Group
- Website: www.wsbi-esbg.org

The World Savings and Retail Banking Institute is an international banking association. It has 99 members in 76 countries, representing over 6,400 savings and retail banks that serve in total 1.7 billion customers across the world.

WSBI is the world's oldest and largest global banking association, representing, advising and connecting retail banks around the world. An important area of work is financial inclusion, where the organisation has worked with the Bill & Melinda Gates Foundation and the Mastercard Foundation.

It shares a common secretariat and office with the European Savings and Retail Banks Group in Brussels.

== Mission ==
Focusing on topics of global importance affecting the banking industry, WSBI represents the interests of its members towards international policymakers and standard setters on the main regulatory and other issues, promotes a vision for a pluralistic banking model, and supports financial inclusion. WSBI also brings together members to exchange knowledge at an international level.

Scale2Save is WSBI’s Development Finance Practice, which assists financial service providers in providing better opportunities to vulnerable people, in areas such as micro and small rural enterprise and farm business support services, including climate-resilient and gender inclusion financial products, better access to digital financial services, and cash-in-cash-out solutions.

== SDG Awards ==
The organization publishes every year a comprehensive report about its members' contributions to the United Nations Sustainable Development Goals, presenting data-driven evidence and case studies of banking initiatives towards an inclusive, sustainable, and resilient future.

The 2025 edition of Driving Global Change features 99 case studies, illustrating how WSBI members support the livelihoods of 1.7 billion customers and invest over US $3.2 billion in philanthropic activities across sectors such as education, health, and the environment.

Since 2025, best practices are also honored by the SDG Awards Ceremony in six categories: Inclusive Banking & Social Impact, Economic Growth & Empowerment, Digital Transformation & Technological Innovation, Climate Finance, Customer Education, and Consumer Protection.

== Global campaigns ==
To promote the importance of savings and honor the memory of Filippo Ravizza and the First International Thrift Congress in Milan in 1924, WSBI-ESBG launches every year its World Savings Day campaign. The 2025 edition, which started in the spring and culminated on 31 October, aimed to challenge the traditional perception of savings, focusing on its symbolic meaning in people's lives, suggesting: "This is not a savings account. It’s far greater than this."

In 2025, WSBI-ESBG began the Social Week campaign to showcase how locally rooted financial institutions contribute to inclusion, sustainability, and community well-being in their communities and, as a direct consequence, around the world. During the Social Week in September, WSBI member banks organized activities in their respective countries centered around financial education and empowerment, community engagement and social inclusion, environmental sustainability, and empowerment and equality.

== History ==
WSBI was founded 1924 at the occasion of the First International Thrift Congress in Milan. Until the Second World War the headquarters of the International Savings Banks Institute remained in Milan. But since Milan had suffered from heavy bombings during the war the Institute moved to Amsterdam in 1948.

In 1963, WSBI's sister organization, the 'Savings Banks Group of the European Economic Community' was created to represent European Savings Banks from the merging European markets. This institution was renamed European Savings and Retail Banks Group in 1988 and was renamed to European Savings and Retail Banking Group in 2013.

The International Savings Banks Institute was again relocated in 1969, this time to Geneva where it remained until 1994 when it was dissolved. In its place, a newly created World Savings Banks Institute (WSBI) was established in Brussels on 9 June 1994. Since then they have changed their name to the World Savings and Retail Banking Institute and the European Savings and Retail Banking Group (WSBI-ESBG), and continue to operate under a common secretariat located in Brussels.

On 30-31 October 2024, WSBI celebrated its 100th anniversary with a landmark World Congress in Rome, Italy. For the occasion, the organization published the book 100 years WSBI that presents the history and the main achievements of the world's oldest and largest global banking association.

== WSBI Members ==
The Americas

- Chile: Banco del Estado de Chile
- Colombia: Banco Caja Social; Federación Latinoamericana de Bancos (FELABAN)*
- Cuba: Banco Popular de Ahorro
- Dominican Republic: Asociación Popular de Ahorros y Préstamos (APAP)
- Ecuador: Banco Pichincha
- El Salvador: SISTEMA FEDECRÉDITO
- Honduras: Banco Atlántida
- Mexico: Inbursa
- Panama: Caja de Ahorros de Panama
- Peru: FEPMAC Federación Peruana Cajas Municipales de Ahorro y Crédito; Caja Huancayo
- United States: Independent Community Bankers of America
- Venezuela: Banco Nacional de Credito

Africa

- Botswana: Botswana Savings Bank
- Burkina Faso: La Poste Burkina Faso
- Cape Verde: Caixa Económica de Cabo Verde (CECV)
- Ethiopia: Awash International Bank
- Ghana: Republic Bank Ghana Limited
- Kenya: Kenya Post Office Savings Bank
- Lesotho: Lesotho PostBank
- Madagascar: Caisse d’Epargne de Madagascar
- Malawi: Centenary Bank Malawi
- Morocco: Al Barid Bank; Caisse de Dépôt et de Gestion
- Nigeria: First City Monument Bank; LAPO Microfinance Bank
- Senegal: PosteFinances
- South Africa: Postbank
- Sudan: Savings and Social Development Bank
- Tanzania: DCB Commercial Bank, Tanzania Commercial Bank
- Uganda: Pearl Bank; Pride Microfinance Limited; Finance Trust Bank; UGAFODE Microfinance Limited; Centenary Bank; FINCA Uganda Limited; BRAC Uganda Bank Ltd
- Zambia: Zambia National Commercial Bank
- Zimbabwe: People's Own Savings Bank, AFC Commercial Bank

Asia

- Bangladesh: Bank Asia
- Cambodia: Cambodia Postbank
- China: Caixa Economica Postal de Macau; Bank of East Asia Limited; Postal Savings Bank of China; Hong Kong Association of Banks
- India: National Bank for Agriculture and Rural Development (NABARD); State Bank of India
- Indonesia: PT Bank Tabungan Negara (Persero)
- Iran: Post Bank Iran
- Korea, Republic of: Korea Federation of Savings Banks (KFSB); Postal Savings Division Republic of Korea Post
- Kyrgyzstan: Eldik Bank OJSC
- Malaysia: Bank Simpanan Nasional
- Pakistan: National Savings (Pakistan)
- Saudi Arabia: Social Development Bank; Arab Gulf Programme for Development (AGFUND)
- Sri Lanka: National Savings Bank (Sri Lanka)
- Tajikistan: State Unitary Enterprise Savings Bank of the Republic of Tajikistan (Amonatbonk)
- Thailand: Government Savings Bank (Thailand)
- Uzbekistan: Ipoteka Bank (as part of OTP Bank Group); XALQ Bank
- Vietnam: Vietnam Bank for Agriculture and Rural Development (Agribank Vietnam)

Europe

- Albania: OTP Banka Albania (as part of OTP Bank Group)
- Austria: Österreichischer Sparkassenverband (Austrian Savings Banks Association)
- Belgium: Coordination of Belgian Savings and Network Banks; Argenta (bank)
- Bulgaria: DSK Bank (as part of OTP Bank Group)
- Croatia: OTP Banka Hrvatska (as part of OTP Bank Group)
- Denmark: Lokale Pengeinstitutter
- Estonia: Swedbank Estonia
- Finland: Säästöpankkiliitto (Finnish Savings Banks Association)
- France: Groupe BPCE; Fédération Nationale des Caisses d'Epargne (FNCE) (National Federation of Savings Banks)
- Germany: Deutscher Sparkassen- und Giroverband (German Savings Banks Association)
- Hungary: OTP Bank Nyrt
- Italy: Associazione di Fondazioni e di Casse di Risparmio SpA; Pri.Banks – Associazione Banche Private Italiane
- Latvia: Swedbank Latvia
- Lithuania: Swedbank Lithuania
- Luxembourg: Banque et Caisse d'Epargne de l'Etat (Spuerkeess)
- Malta: Bank of Valletta
- Moldova: OTP Bank (as part of OTP Bank Group)
- Montenegro: CKB (as part of OTP Bank Group)
- Netherlands: ASN Bank
- Norway: Sparebankforeningen i Norge
- Portugal: Banco Montepio
- Serbia: OTP Banka Srbija (as part of OTP Bank Group)
- Slovenia: OTP Banka (as part of OTP Bank Group)
- Spain: CaixaBank, CECA
- Sweden: Sparbankernas Riksförbund (Swedish Association of Savings Banks and Savings Bank Foundations); Swedbank
- Switzerland: Frankfurter Bankgesellschaft Schweiz AG
- Ukraine: OTP Bank (as part of OTP Bank Group)

== See also ==
- World Bank
- World Savings Day
- European Savings Banks Group
