= Caja Navarra scandal =

2012 banking scandal in Spain

The Caja Navarra scandal was a banking scandal in northern Spain that unraveled in 2012 after the absorption of Caja Navarra (CAN) bank when it was integrated into the bad bank Banca Civica, by CaixaBank. Caja Navarra lost all its value which causing its actual demise. Caja Navarra's acronym and brand CAN was kept and converted into a foundation by the Spanish government. The highly controversial crash of the institution gave way to a demand of responsibilities.

== Approach ==
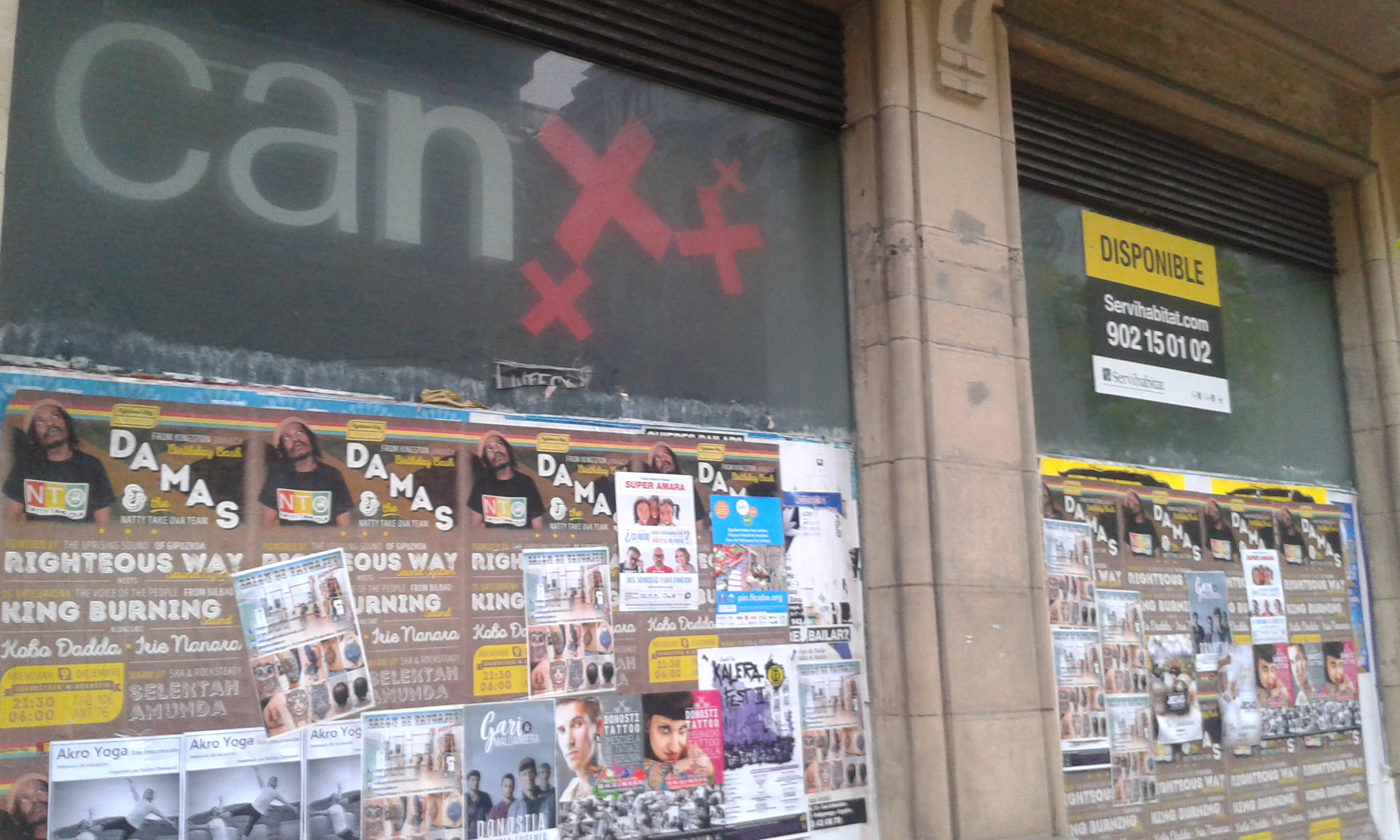
A closed Caja Navarra branch in San Sebastián

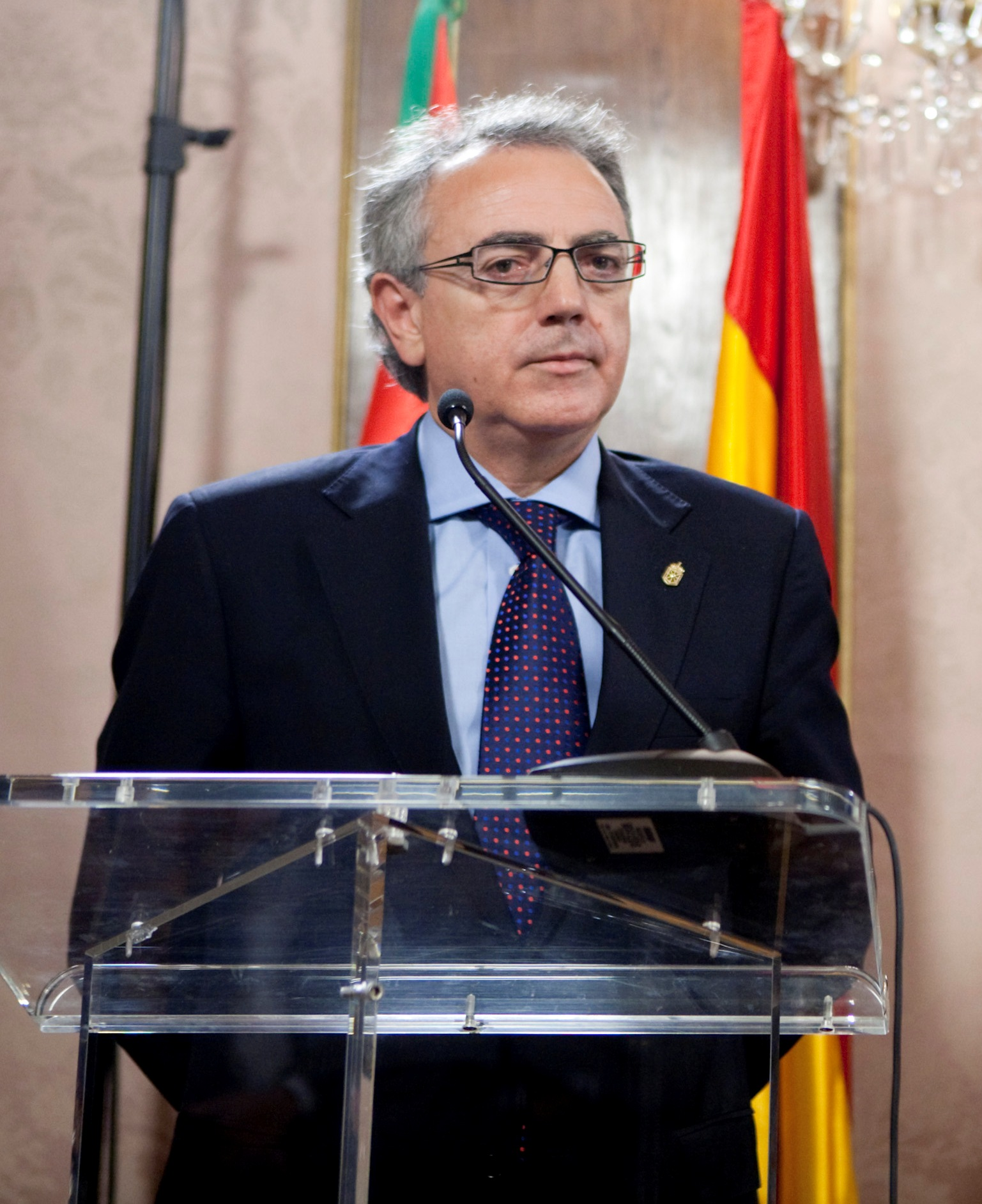
Miguel Sanz, ex-president of Navarre

Caja Navarra (CAN) is a merger of two entrenched savings banks renowned for their proximity to the Navarrese people, and considered a sign of identity, as well as a symbol of Navarre's economic solvency and autonomy. In the 1980s and 1990s, 43% of the money of the Navarrese was held in either of both institutions, representing the prime financial institution in Navarre.

After the fusion of the savings banks Caja Provincial de Navarra and Caja de Ahorros Municipal de Pamplona in 2000, the re-founded institution undertook a series of financial operations and expansion of its branches out of Navarre (including a representative office in Washington). As a result, CAN's assets plummeted.

The savings bank became insolvent in 2012 after years of asset-stripping, including the mysterious disappearance of its artistic collection. The fallout of the scandal affected high- and mid-ranking officials of the regional party UPN (Unión del Pueblo Navarro) who held political and managerial positions both within the bank and the Government of Navarre.

== Mismanagement ==
In 2010 the Board of Founding Partners was established to insulate Caja Navarra from political meddling, but paradoxically it integrated well-known political personalities, all of them high-ranking members of UPN and PSN (Spanish Socialists in Navarre), such as Yolanda Barcina, Miguel Sanz, Alberto Catalán, Roberto Jimenez, or Enrique Maya (mayor of Pamplona since 2011).

Caja Navarra-related societies of dubious operation came into being, such as Sociedad Industrial de CAN and HISCAN Patrimonio S.L. Their Permanent Board members, all of them high-ranking officials or ex-officials of the government of Navarre (UPN) and PSN, have come to be accused of receiving irregular bonuses. Only in 2011, the 16 permanent board members of HISCAN Patrimonio S.L. received 121,000 euros in bonuses, a period in which CAN incurred heavy financial losses estimated at 203 million euros in just one year, down from 500-plus millions’ worth, during Yolanda Barcina’s one-year tenure in the board.

It was revealed that Yolanda Barcina, Miguel Sanz, Álvaro Miranda, and Enrique Maya got paid 2,860 and 1,717 euros each for participating in one-hour meetings (two consecutively) of a ghostly Permanent Board, held 16 times. The meetings consisted of a financial briefing to the board members, in which no questions were made and no minutes were recorded. After the revelations, president of the region Yolanda Barcina claimed she would give the money back, while apologizing to the people of Navarre for her behaviour.

In the period extending from 2004 to 2011, the estimated figure in bonuses to representatives of political, social and cultural agencies affiliated to Caja Navarra (including Ricardo Martín Fluxa, a Spanish ex-Secretary of State for Security, or Javier Iturbe, PSN ex-president and member of the Board of Directors) amounted to 4,3 million euros.

== Parliamentary investigation ==
In late 2014, opposition parties of the Parliament of Navarre promoted the establishment of a parliamentary investigation panel to clear responsibilities. The Spanish Socialists' branch in Navarre, the PSN, voiced its misgivings, while the party at the centre of the controversy, the anti-Basque UPN, showed a frontal refusal, arguing that the case had to be left to Justice, actually Madrid tribunals (a Supreme Court ruling had recently acquitted the president of Navarre Yolanda Barcina of legal misconduct in the scandal of Caja Navarra’s irregular bonuses).

However, a vote majority in the regional parliament made it possible the creation of that panel. Opposition parties (Geroa Bai, EH Bildu, Izquierda-Ezkerra) other than the Spanish Conservatives (PP) lashed out at the Socialists for attempting to constrain the range of topics to be addressed in the scrutiny, as well as allowing with their abstention to propel the party UPN, allegedly responsible for Caja Navarra's demise and main opponent to the parliamentary investigation, to chair the investigation panel and hold a critical position.

== See also ==
- Corruption in Navarre
