= Isidre Fainé =

Catalan businessperson

Isidre Fainé i Casas
- Isidre Fainé i Casas
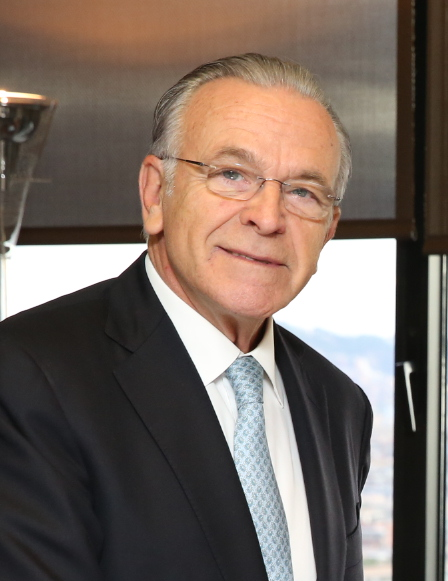
- Isidre Fainé in 2014
- Born: 1942 (age 83–84); Manresa, Catalonia (Spain)
- Education: University of Barcelona (economics and business administration)
- Occupations: businessperson, corporate executive
- Years active: 1960s-
- Employer: La Caixa
- Known for: banking leader
- Board member of: Telefónica, Naturgy, La Caixa, Caixabank, Bank of East Asia
- Spouse: Montserrat Garriga
- Children: 8
- Parents: Ramon Fainé Torras (father); Maria Casas Fosas (mother)
- Awards: Creu de Sant Jordi (2010), Knight of the National Order of the Legion of Honour (2010)

Isidre Fainé i Casas (Manresa, 1942) is a Catalan business manager and banker. He is chairman of La Caixa.

== Biography ==
From a humble family, he grew up in Manresa, son of Ramon Fainé Torras and Maria Casas Fosas. He inherited from his mother a commercial and negotiating character. He moved to live with his parents in Barcelona, where at the age of 13 he began his professional life repairing bicycles and motorcycles in a workshop. He worked at several small companies while studying high school in the afternoons.

He obtained a doctorate in Economic Sciences from the University of Barcelona. He also holds an ISMP in Business Administration from the Harvard Business School and a diploma in Senior Management from the IESE Business School.

=== Banking career ===
He began his professional banking career as director of Investments at Banco Atlántico, in 1964, to join later, in 1969, as general manager at Banco de Asunción in Paraguay. He then returned to Barcelona to hold different positions of responsibility in various smaller financial institutions: director of personnel at Banca Riva y García (1973). A year later, aged 32, he started working at Banca Jover where he would become general manager of the entity. He would later be general manager of Banco Unión in 1978.

In 1982, Josep Vilarasau invited him to join "Caixa de Pensions per a la Vellesa i d'Estalvis de Catalunya i Balears" as deputy general manager, where over time he held various positions of responsibility, as deputy general manager executive (1991), a position he shared with Antoni Brufau. When Vilarasau was appointed president, in April 1999, Fainé was appointed general director of the entity, whose presidency he later assumed, in June 2007. In addition, he has been president of "la Caixa" Foundation and of Criteria CaixaHolding. He left the presidency of CaixaBank in June 2016.

=== Other positions ===
Isidre Fainé has been, since June 16, 2014, chairperson of "la Caixa" Foundation, after being part of the process of disassociating the "la Caixa" Foundation from the banking entity and transforming it into the first foundation in continental Europe and the third in the world, after the Bill & Melinda Gates Foundation (United States) and the Wellcome Trust (United Kingdom).

He also holds the presidency of the Spanish Confederation of Savings Banks (CECA). In addition, since 2015 he is president of the European Savings Banks Group (ESBG); orderly banking restructuring (FROB), and vice president of Telefónica, Abertis and Grupo Agbar. He is also a board member of the Banco Português de Investimento and the Bank of East Asia. In September 2016 he assumed the presidency of Gas Natural, nowadays called Naturgy. Fainé is also president of the Spanish Confederation of Managers and Executives (CEDE), of the Catalan Federation of Savings Banks, of the Spanish Chapter of the Club of Rome and of the Financial Circle and vice-president of IPEMED (Institute of Prospective Economics du Monde Méditerranéen).

He is a member of the Royal Academy of Economic and Financial Sciences of Spain since 1992 and of the Royal Academy of Doctors of Spain.

== Publications ==
Lists of the main books and published works:

- 1987 – Redes estratégicas colectivas
- 1992 – Liderazgo y progreso económico (with Jaume Gil Aluja)
- 1997 – Un alegato a favor del empleo. (with Joan Bassegoda i Nonell)
- 2001 – La empresa familiar y su mundialización (with Antón Pont i Amenós)
- 2003 – Pasión por la banca (with Robert Tornabell)

== Awards ==
- 2007 — Member of merit of the College of Economists of Catalonia
- 2010 — Creu de Sant Jordi of the Generalitat de Catalunya.
- 2010 — Knight of the National Order of the Legion of Honour for France.
- 2011 — Financial Award of the Year awarded by the Ecofin Forum
- 2011 — Medal of Honor as Entrepreneur of the Year for the Promotion of Work.
- 2017 — Financial Award of the Year awarded by the Ecofin Forum
- 2018 — Philanthropist of the Year Award by Forbes Spain.
- 2023 — Grand Order of the Cross of the Prince Henry of Portugal
