= Eufiserv =

European interbank network

European Savings Banks Financial Services (EUFISERV)
- Operating area: Austria, Belgium, Czech Republic, Finland, France, Germany, Italy, Netherlands, Norway, Portugal, Spain, Sweden, Switzerland
- Members: unknown
- ATMs: 57,246
- Founded: 1988 (as the ATM Co-operation project)

EUFISERV (European Savings Banks Financial Services) is a European interbank network connecting the ATMs of savings banks in Austria, Belgium, the Czech Republic, Finland, France, Germany, Italy, the Netherlands, Norway, Portugal, Spain, Sweden, and Switzerland. It is the largest and the only international credit union-owned interbank network in Europe.

== History ==
- 1988: The ATM Co-operation project of the European Savings Banks Group was set up.
- 1990: The company EUFISERV S.C. was founded to develop the ATM Co-operation project into a full-service interbank network.
- 1992: Visa International and Eufiserv signed an agreement to provide mutual cash dispensing services.
- 1996: MasterCard and Eufiserv signed an agreement to provide mutual cash dispensing services.
- 1999: American Express and Eufiserv signed an agreement to provide access to American Express cards at EUFISERV ATMs.
- 2005: China UnionPay and Eufiserv signed an agreement to provide access to CUP cards at EUFISERV ATMs.
- 2007: Eufiserv is one of the six founders of the Euro Alliance of Payment Schemes s.c.r.l.
- 2012: Ceases to be active in Luxembourg.

== Gateway Services ==
Eufiserv provides Gateway Services to the Visa PLUS network, to MasterCard's Cirrus network, and to the networks of American Express and China UnionPay. All ATMs in the Eufiserv network are connected to the gateways to Visa PLUS, Cirrus and American Express, and therefore accept all Visa, Visa Electron, Visa Debit, PLUS, MasterCard, Maestro, Cirrus, and American Express cards but, until now, only selected ATMs are connected to the CUP gateway. The operations of the gateways to the Visa PLUS and Cirrus networks are outsourced by EUFISERV to Confederacion Espanola de Cajas de Ahorros in Spain.

== Network Members ==
- ESBG: European Savings Banks Group
- Austria: Hauptverband der Österreichischen Sparkassen
- Belgium: BNP Paribas Fortis
- Czech Republic: Česká spořitelna
- Finland: Säästöpankkiliitto (Finnish Savings Banks Association)
- France: Caisse nationale des Caisses d'épargne (CNCE)
- Germany: Deutscher Sparkassen- und Giroverband (DSGV) and Finanz Informatik
- Norway: Sparbankforeningen I Norge
- Portugal: Caixa Geral de Depósitos
- Spain: Confederación Española de Cajas de Ahorros (CECA)
- Sweden Sparbanken Swedbank
- Switzerland: La Poste - PostFinance

== Former members ==
- Italy (ICBPI - Istituto Centrale delle Banche Popolari Italiana) left the Network in 2009 one year later the acquisition of CartaSì, the largest Italian Cards Operator.
- Luxembourg: Banque et caisse d'épargne de l'État left the network per 1 January 2012, when the whole Luxembourg retail banking sector switched to Visa's V Pay system, replacing the former national Bancomat system.
