= Corruption in Navarre =

Institutional corruption in the country

Corruption in Navarre refers to a quick succession of corruption scandals which have come to light since 2012 referring to the UPN's tenure in office (since 1996). However, amidst heated political confrontation since the late days of Franco's dictatorship, the first corruption cases erupted early on, going back to the first government cabinets formed after the establishment of Navarre's "Betterment" (the Amejoramiento, a Navarre-specific administrative system, 1982).

In 1996, Miguel Sanz's government started a 15-year period of distancing and breaking of virtually all historic institutional bonds and cultural cooperation with fellow Basque provinces, citing fears of a "Basque nationalist takeover", and billing themselves as the guarantee of Navarrese institutions and identity. However, two prime rallying points and historic flagship institutions of all the Navarrese, i.e.Caja Navarra and Osasuna, collapsed during the UPN's tenure in office.

== Recent scandals and irregularities ==
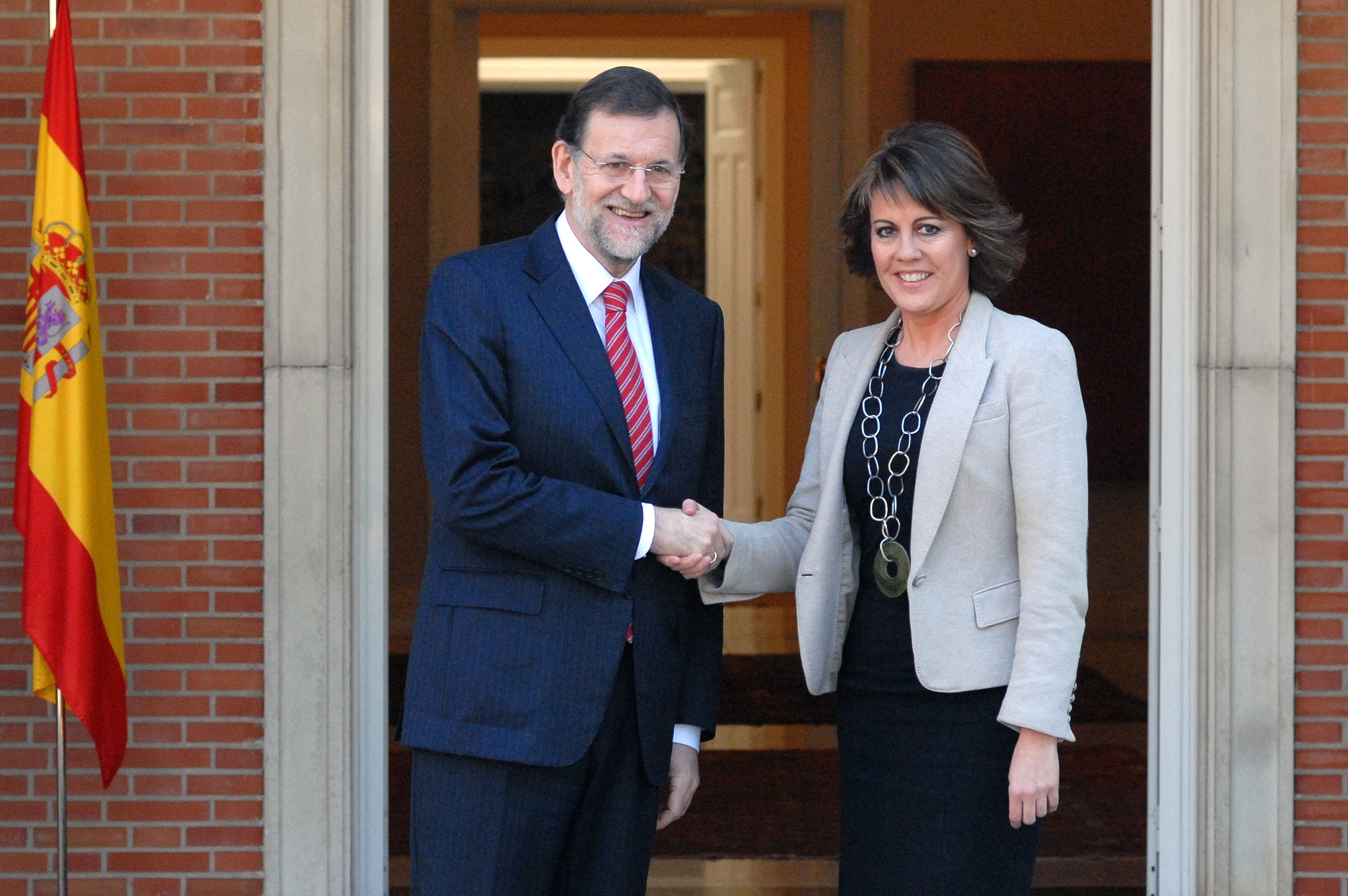
Yolanda Barcina, former president of Navarre (2011-2015), shaking hands with Spanish premier Mariano Rajoy

- Caja Navarra scandal: Erupted in 2012 under the presidency of Enrique Goñi, resulting in the disappearance of the historic Navarrese savings bank.
- Cervera affair: A development of the Caja Navarra scandal, it jumped onto the spotlight in December 2012 when Santiago Cervera, a Navarrese Spanish Conservative leader, was found collecting an envelope containing 25,000 euros at the old rampart of Pamplona, and arrested on the spot. The money happened to be a bait planted by the Civil Guard, but Cervera was accused of attempting to blackmail former Caja Navarra CEO Jose Antonio Asiain in exchange for keeping silent on inconvenient Caja Navarra facts. Right the opposite, besides claiming that he was duped, Cervera blamed the whole affair on his opposition to "the looting" taking place in Caja Navarra, aligning in that denouncement with the Navarrese Basque nationalists.
- Racing circuit of Los Arcos: A white elephant case operating at a loss with questioned allocation of works and UPN's government intervention. Designed under Miguel Sanz and Yolanda Barcina, the project was allocated to the building company Samaniego but it soon risked bankruptcy, in the face of which the regional government purchased 95% of its capital. The Government of Navarre had to request a credit to meet expenses incurred on the construction works, a figure rising to 62 million euros. Once the circuit opened in 2010, it operated at a loss from scratch (2,6 million euros on its first year). In December 2013, the regional government sold all of the facilities to Los Arcos Motorsport, leading to a balance sheet of 45 million in losses.
- Public Health Service catering case: Recurrent complaints by patients over the catering service (contractor Mediterranea de Catering) due to poor standards in food, denied by the Government of Navarre. A tribunal imposed a fine on the catering service. The recently outsourced service was found to be operating at higher expenses than the regular public catering service in force up to that point, as disclosed by the Accountancy Chamber of Navarre (the Comptos). Opposition parties, besides condemning the lack of transparency, labeled "a scandal" the conclusions of the Accountancy Chamber's report, one that pointed to financial losses coupled with a deterioration in food standards following outsourcing of the service. These parties demanded in turn the resignation of regional Health Secretary Marta Vera. Just the opposite, UPN's regional government, while "respecting" the conclusions, protested their not considering "the actual circumstances" of the moment the privatization decision was made.
- Health Service crisis: In September 2014, Juan José Rubio, Chief Manager of the Navarre Health Service (Osasunbidea), stepped down on operative and managerial outlook discrepancies with Health Secretary of Navarre Marta Vera (UPN); Rubio had been asked to "remain shut in his office" and "out of touch with the board of directors." Mr. Rubio, who had been appointed to the highest position in Osasunbidea by the regional government, dwelt later on details, claiming the "organization is sick", involving serious dysfunctions and discontentment among professional and patients alike and pointing to privileges in the Health Service favouring "certain families and crusts" from Navarre. He called for the institution's urgent and necessary re-foundation. The regional party UPN, in office, put Mr. Rubio's resignation down to his "inability to accommodate." Opposition parties made Ms. Vera fully responsible for the current state of the public Health Service.
- City Police scandals: A series of abuses and arbitrary behaviour detected on the chief officials of the corps Simon Santamaria and Ignacio Polo. The Professional Union of City Police Officers of Spain pointed out that the "work atmosphere between officials and superiors is very tense", with the Pamplona City Police showing the highest work absenteeism rate in like environments across Spain, due to stress and depression. The union's serious allegations against the chief head Santamaria included bullying, harassment, false evidence, and reprisals against police officers, besides denouncing mayor Enrique Maya's championing of the chief official. The UPN-appointed Santamaria eventually resigned after political opposition build-up, with opposition parties considering the situation "untenable" and the corps "a paramilitary body". In stark contrast, Maya saluted Santamaria's job during his tenure as "very good". In similar circumstances, Pamplona's Citizen Security deputy of Pamplona Ignacio Polo (UPN) was convicted of drink-driving, with his allegations against lower-rank police officers conducting the alcohol check being dismissed.
- Osasuna scandal: This erupted in early 2015 related to the iconic Navarrese top-flight football club, with links to the Treasury of the Government of Navarre, involving tax evasion, turning a blind eye in governmental surveillance duties, match fixing practices, etc. A UPN-PP-PSN majority vote in the Parliament of Navarre passed a blind fiscal bailout on Osasuna without waiting to audit results while refusing to hand over Osasuna's accountancy information to opposition parties for their consideration ahead of the vote on the law. PSN's spokesperson claimed "they had not been told" of any irregular finances by the directive board of Osasuna, while on the opposite side, EH Bildu branded the whole affair "a disgrace". The football club owed the Government of Navarre 52,8 million euros, but after handing over its patrimony to the government of Navarre, the club's debt rises to 20,6 million euros after the law passed by UPN, PP and PSN. The club is under scrutiny by the European Commission in May 2015.

== Governmental corruption record ==
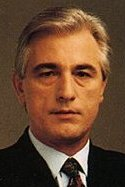
Gabriel Urralburu, former president of Navarre

- FASA affair (1980-1983): A scandal of public funds embezzlement involving UCD high-ranking official and president of Navarre Jaime Ignacio del Burgo (1979-1983), eventually impeached by the parliament and deposed by the Regional Government (1983). Years later, a tribunal declared him innocent.
- Urralburu affair: Socialist president of Navarre (1983-1991) involved in corruption for kickbacks received in public works. Condemned to prison term in 1995. In 1998, he was also convicted of continued bribery and offences against governmental treasury and mismanagement of public funds within the Luis Roldán case, centred also in Navarre, for which he was given an 11-year-prison sentence. However, by 2001 he was on parole months after getting imprisoned.
- Otano affair: Socialist president of Navarre Javier Otano (1995-1996) was leading a tripartite coalition with parties Eusko Alkartasuna and CDN when revelations broke out of the existence of a bank account under his name in Switzerland, with Otano announcing his resignation from office almost immediately. Otano categorically denied any personal intent for his signature on the account, signing only "on request of Urralburu" in 1991 for the sake of the party. It was revealed as a case of illegal funding of the Spanish Socialists in Navarre and fraud to the Navarre Treasury driven by Gabriel Urralburu, with deep political implications. The coalition broke up right away, and Juan Cruz Alli, the leading figure of CDN (a splinter party of UPN), blamed the scandal directly on "Socialist disloyalty" for demolishing "the possibility of building an alternative Government of Navarre [other than UPN or PSN] integrating diverse political options and therefore betting on the support of the bulk of the Navarre society."
- Lourdes Goicoechea scandal (2014): A scandal erupting in Yolanda Barcina's cabinet involving embezzlement and preferential treatment including the Opus Dei. The Parliament of Navarre launched a parliamentary probe, concluding that the president of Navarre did not explain irregularities or account for obscure practices, for which a majority resolution censured UPN's Barcina. Still, despite pointing that UPN's regional government is "tainted by a corruption scandal" and declaring that "ETA and Bildu are scarecrows used by the same old people to remain in power no matter what", Spanish Socialists in Navarre failed to remove ("kick out") Barcina from office, leaving a deadlocked government, as instructed by the Socialist party executive in Madrid. Weeks after erupting the political scandal, the Spanish Supreme Court of Justice stated that no evidence of corruption or mismanagement had been found in the Goicoechea affair and closed the file.

== See also ==
- International Anti-Corruption Academy
- Group of States Against Corruption
- International Anti-Corruption Day
- ISO 37001 Anti-bribery management systems
- United Nations Convention against Corruption
- OECD Anti-Bribery Convention
- Transparency International
