= Cajasol =

Cajasol could refer to:

- Cajasol Sevilla, a Spanish professional basketball team in Liga ACB.
- One of the four banks that merged to form Banca Civica
