= Banca Civica =

Banca Cívica
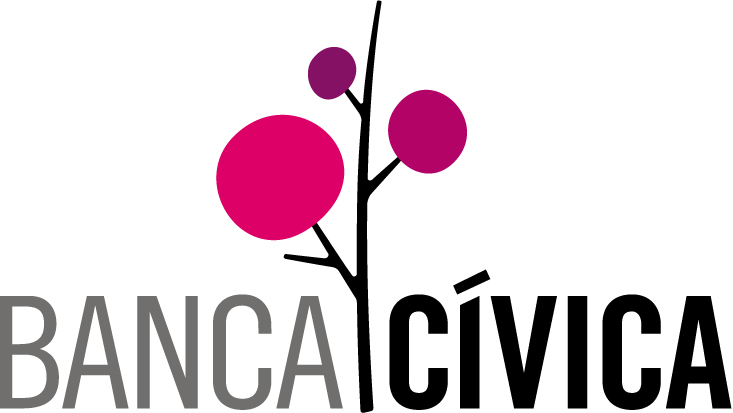
- Industry: Financial services
- Headquarters: Spain
- Website: www.bancacivica.es

Banca Cívica, S.A. was a bank created as a result of the European debt crisis as an emergency response by the Spanish government regulatory authority "Institutional Protection System" (Spanish: Sistema Institucional de Protección, or SIP) that comprised the savings banks of Caja Navarra, Caja Canarias, Caja de Burgos and Cajasol. It became part of Caixabank on 3 August 2012, at which time shares for the company ceased to be quoted.

== History ==
This institution, the founding entities of which were Caja de Burgos, CajaCanarias and Caja Navarra, was incorporated as a bank by means of notarial instrument issued on 9 June 2010. It began operating on 18 June 2010 and was the first SIP to operate in Spain.

The institution announced its merger with CaixaBank on 23 March 2012.

On 26 June 2012, the Extraordinary General Shareholders' Meeting approved the institution's incorporation in CaixaBank. The operation established the leading institution on the Spanish market, with over 13 million clients and assets of 342,000 million euros. Incorporation neither required public guarantees nor represented any cost at all to the rest of the finance sector.

On 3 August 2012, the merger of Banca Cívica into CaixaBank was registered, resulting in the absorption of Banca Cívica and its dissolution.

On 9 April 2013, CaixaBank returned the €977 million that FROB had provided to Banca Cívica.

== Stock Market ==
Banca Civica raised 600 million Euros in its IPO in July 2011.

== See also ==
- Caja Navarra scandal
- Caja de Guadalajara
- 2008–14 Spanish financial crisis
- List of banks in Spain
