= EAPS =

EAPS can mean:

- Ethernet Automatic Protection Switching
- European Association for Population Studies
- Ethnic Affairs Priorities Statement
- Euro Alliance of Payment Schemes
- European Academy of Paediatric Societies
- The Department of Earth, Atmospheric, and Planetary Sciences in the Massachusetts Institute of Technology School of Science
  - and, by extension, the Green Building (MIT) that contains that department
