= Stock Market Learning =

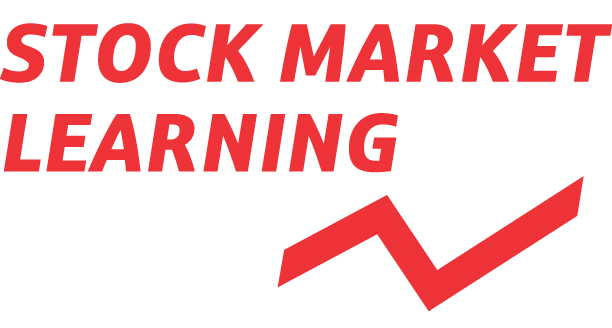
Stock Market Learning - Logo

Stock Market Learning is an international competition run by the Savings Banks in Europe with the support of the European Savings Banks Group (ESBG) based in Brussels. It aims to provide pupils a better understanding of the stock market and of the economic and financial world by simulating transactions in stock exchanges. The competition was held for the first time in Germany in 1983, while the Savings Banks in Europe became actively involved in 1999. By 2010, over 1 million teams had taken part in the initiative.

== Procedure ==
Each team is assigned an account with virtual capital that is to be used to buy and sell securities. The purpose is to increase initial assets by conducting individual investing strategies. While capital is virtual, trading is based on real stock prices at certain stock exchanges.

The list of tradable securities consists primarily of shares but also includes fixed-interests securities and investment funds. Since 2009, there is both a conventional and sustainability competition. The former takes into consideration the total performance of the account, whereas the latter is based on the sustainability account value, i.e. on the earnings gained from shares listed in a sustainability index.

== Awards ==
In 2010, Stock Market Learning received the official UN Decade Project of Education for Sustainable Development award from the German Commission for UNESCO.
