= Antonio Argadoña =

Spanish economist

Antonio Argadoña is a Spanish economist, the Emeritus Professor of Economics and Business Ethics and CaixaBank Chair, from University of Navarra. His published expertise being macroeconomics and monetary economics, economic and business ethics, corporate social responsibility and management economics and has been widely published by Springer.
