= Santiago Cervera =

Spanish politician (born 1965)

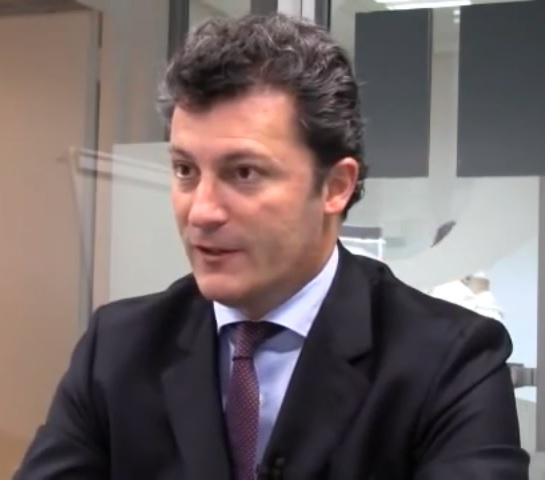

Santiago Cervera Soto (Pamplona, Spain, 27 March 1965) is a Spanish former politician who belonged to the People's Party (PP) of Navarre.

Divorced, Cervera began his political career in 1988 when he was elected to Pamplona council for the Navarrese People's Union (Spanish: Unión del Pueblo Navarro). This party, abbreviated to UPN, is a right wing regional party which formed an electoral alliance with the larger PP in 1991. At the time of his election, Cervera was still studying medicine in the University of Pamplona. He remained a councillor until 1996. In 1993 he entered national politics when he was elected to the Spanish Senate representing Navarre. He served one term in the Senate and at the 1996 General Election he was placed third on the UPN list for the Spanish Congress of Deputies, missing out on the final seat by just 170 votes. In 1996 he was appointed Health Minister in the regional administration of Navarra, serving until 2003.

In September 2007 he accepted an offer to head the UPN list for the 2008 General election and was returned as MP for Navarra Province. In November 2008, following the PP decision to end their alliance with the UPN, Cervera announced his resignation from the UPN and announced that he would sit in future as a PP deputy.

On 9 December 2012 he was arrested on suspicion of involvement in attempted blackmail of the President of Caja Navarra (CAN), José Antonio Asiaín. On indictment, he resigned from Congress without waiting for the Supreme Court decision and ceased to be a member of the PP. He was acquitted of the charges in June 2015, insisting that he had been the victim of entrapment.

== See also ==
- Corruption in Navarre
