= Euro Alliance of Payment Schemes =

The Euro Alliance of Payment Schemes (EAPS) was an international alliance of European bank and interbank networks that had aimed to creating a pan-European debit card system in the Single Euro Payments Area to rival the US-based Visa and Mastercard using existing country specific systems. It was launched in 2007 with the support of the European Union but failed and was abandoned sometime after 2013. A second attempt, the European Payments Initiative, later proved successful.

== History ==
The Brussels-based consortium, formally announced in July 2007, included such members as Electronic_cash in Germany, Bancomat/PagoBancomat in Italy, Multibanco in Portugal, EURO 6000 in Spain, LINK in the United Kingdom and EUFISERV, an ATM system operated internationally by the European Savings Banks Group. Though not allying itself with EAPS, the European Central Bank spoke in February 2007 in favor of the work being done by EAPS as "the first step towards a consolidation of card schemes, leading to a European card scheme". Prior to the implementation of the EAPS alliance, only Mastercard/Maestro and Visa/V Pay debit cards could be used abroad in Europe. EAPS was first initiated particularly to challenge Mastercard's hold on international debit payments.

According to European Card Review in 2007, EAPS was expected to play a less pivotal role in spreading the Single Euro Payments Area initiative than larger schemes such as the "Falkensteiner Group" which they believed to include UniCredit, Société Générale, ING and Deutsche Bank, but was nevertheless capable of a "marginal" role. The "Falkensteiner Runde" (Falkensteiner Circle) – according to the Lafferty Group to consist of ABN AMRO, Allianz Dresdner, ING Bank, Rabobank, UniCredit, Deutsche Bank, Société Générale and Commerzbank – was discussing an alternative interbank network based on the German Girocard network joined by the French Carte Bancaire network. About the same time in early 2007 another initiative was formed in the "PayFair" company in Brussels to implement the European Payment Scheme. This effort was building an infrastructure from scratch focussing at first to rebuild the POS (i.e. non-bank) infrastructure in Belgium and Netherlands as of 2008 and expanded to Germany during 2010 via "easycash" terminals. Founded in 2008, the "Monnet Project" was unveiled in Frankfurt in 2009 listing the same members as reported earlier on the Falkensteiner Circle. Later reports cite these three elements – Monnet Project, PayFair scheme, EAPS council – as the driving forces behind SEPA-centric alternatives for debit card networks.

Meanwhile, EAPS announced the bilateral cooperation of ATM interbank networks, namely the German Girocard acceptance at Italian Bancomat ATMs, Italian Bancomat card acceptance at German Girocard ATMs and German Girocard acceptance at UK LINK ATMs. Independently the European savings banks had created the pan-European Eufiserv network to mutually accept debit cards at their ATMs; Eufiserv was a founder of the EAPS council.

On May 5, 2010, the Monnet Project held a meeting in Madrid to endorse a European Card Project. From the 30 banks that were attending it occurred that 12 banks from 8 countries volunteered to join a consortium phase to detail the technical requirements and to prepare treaties on the foundation of a new bankcard payment company. The ECB welcomed these steps pointing to the China UnionPay example that a new bankcard brand can quickly gain acceptance with China UnionPay being accepted in 29 European countries plus 60 more countries worldwide. It was predicted that by 2010 the results of the consortium phase would lead into a definite decision to build a new bankcard infrastructure, this was not to be the case.

The project failed and was abandoned at some time after this.

== See also ==
- European Payments Initiative
