= European Savings and Retail Banks Group =

European trade association for savings banks

European Savings and Retail Banking Group
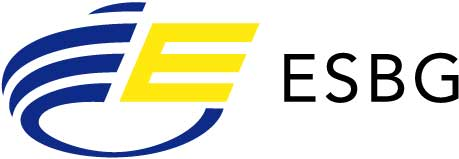
- Abbreviation: ESBG
- Formation: 1963; 63 years ago
- Type: Trade association
- Legal status: Non-profit company
- Purpose: Represent savings banks at the European Union
- Location: Brussels, Belgium
- Region served: Europe
- Members: 32 (2026)
- President: Nicolas Namias, CEO of BPCE Group
- Affiliations: World Savings and Retail Banks Institute
- Website: www.wsbi-esbg.org

The European Savings and Retail Banking Group is a European banking association representing 32 members from 27 countries (EU and non-EU), comprising 857 savings and retail banks. These institutions operate a total of 37,000 branches and employ 620,000 people.

As of 2026, ESBG members had €3.715 trillion in loans to on their books, financing households and SMEs, and supporting productive investment across the Europe. As of 2024, ESBG had declared 22 lobbyists working for the organisation.

== History and activities ==
The European Savings and Retail Banking Group was founded in 1963 as the 'Savings Banks Group of the European Economic Community'. The association changed its name to European Savings Banks Group in 1988 and then to its current name in 2013. ESBG is the sister organization of the World Savings and Retail Banks Institute, with both organizations managed in Brussels by a WSBI-ESBG jointly run Office.

ESBG represents the locally focused European banking sector at the center of EU decision-making, helping European savings and retail banks strengthen their unique approach that focuses on providing service to local communities and boosting SMEs. It also advocates for a diverse banking sector, arguing that pluralism and diversity safeguard the market against shocks that arise from time to time, whether caused by internal or external forces.

== Publications ==
In 2025, ESBG published its flagship report Keep it Simple, putting forward a practical and forward-looking roadmap to simplify EU financial regulation and better connect it to the needs of the real economy. Aiming at policymakers, regulators, and stakeholders across the EU financial sector, the report drew on the collective experience of locally rooted savings and retail banks, and offered constructive proposals to make regulation on capital and tax rules, sustainability, digital finance, and consumer protection more coherent and proportionate.

In 2026, ESBG's Competitiveness is Now report presented a policy‑oriented analysis of the challenges facing Europe’s competitiveness, with a strong focus on the role of savings and retail banks in supporting the real economy. With concrete recommendations to simplify capital, reporting, and supervisory frameworks while safeguarding financial stability, the publication framed regulatory simplification and better coordination as essential enablers of growth, innovation, and Europe’s green and digital transitions.

== Main events ==
ESBG hosts the Retail Banking Conference every year, bringing together members of the European Parliament, high-level officials from the European Commission, the ECB and other EU institutions, as well as CEOs and top representatives of savings and retail banks to discuss the future of the banking sector and its contribution to Europe's strategic priorities in key areas, such as payments, long-term investment and housing.[6]

Since 1999, the ESBG has backed an international competition called the European Stock Market Learning. Organized by Savings Banks, the stock market simulation contest aims to enhance financial literacy and equip high school students with a better understanding of the economic and financial world, including the functioning of the stock markets. In 2025 and 2026, ESBG hosted the ESML Awards Ceremony to celebrate the top-performing student groups and their teachers. In 2026, a new category was added to prizes: the Sustainability Award, which honors the successful integration of environmental, social, and governance considerations into investment strategies.[7]

== SDG Awards ==
The organization publishes every year a comprehensive report about its members' contributions to the United Nations Sustainable Development Goals, presenting data-driven evidence and case studies of banking initiatives towards an inclusive, sustainable, and resilient future.

The 2025 edition of Driving Global Change features 99 case studies, illustrating how WSBI members support the livelihoods of 1.7 billion customers and invest over US $3.2 billion in philanthropic activities across sectors such as education, health, and the environment.

Since 2025, best practices are also honored by the SDG Awards Ceremony in six categories: Inclusive Banking & Social Impact, Economic Growth & Empowerment, Digital Transformation & Technological Innovation, Climate Finance, Customer Education, and Consumer Protection.

== Global campaigns ==
To promote the importance of savings and honor the memory of Filippo Ravizza and the First International Thrift Congress in Milan in 1924, WSBI-ESBG launches every year its World Savings Day campaign. The 2025 edition, which started in the spring and culminated on 31 October, aimed to challenge the traditional perception of savings, focusing on its symbolic meaning in people's lives, suggesting: "This is not a savings account. It’s far greater than this."

In 2025, WSBI-ESBG began the Social Week campaign to showcase how locally rooted financial institutions contribute to inclusion, sustainability, and community well-being in their communities and, as a direct consequence, around the world. During the Social Week in September, WSBI member banks organized activities in their respective countries centered around financial education and empowerment, community engagement and social inclusion, environmental sustainability, and empowerment and equality.

== ESBG Members ==
- Albania: OTP Banka Albania (as part of OTP Bank Group)
- Austria: Österreichischer Sparkassenverband (Austrian Savings Banks Association)
- Belgium: Coordination of Belgian Savings and Network Banks; Argenta (bank)
- Bulgaria: DSK Bank (as part of OTP Bank Group)
- Croatia: OTP Banka Hrvatska (as part of OTP Bank Group)
- Denmark: Lokale Pengeinstitutter
- Estonia: Swedbank Estonia
- Finland: Säästöpankkiliitto (Finnish Savings Banks Association)
- France: Groupe BPCE; Fédération Nationale des Caisses d'Epargne (FNCE) (National Federation of Savings Banks)
- Germany: Deutscher Sparkassen- und Giroverband (German Savings Banks Association)
- Hungary: OTP Bank Nyrt
- Italy: Associazione di Fondazioni e di Casse di Risparmio SpA; Pri.Banks – Associazione Banche Private Italiane
- Latvia: Swedbank Latvia
- Lithuania: Swedbank Lithuania
- Luxembourg: Banque et Caisse d'Epargne de l'Etat (Spuerkeess)
- Malta: Bank of Valletta
- Moldova: OTP Bank (as part of OTP Bank Group)
- Montenegro: CKB (as part of OTP Bank Group)
- Netherlands: ASN Bank
- Norway: Sparebankforeningen i Norge
- Portugal: Banco Montepio
- Serbia: OTP Banka Srbija (as part of OTP Bank Group)
- Slovenia: OTP Banka (as part of OTP Bank Group)
- Spain: CaixaBank, CECA
- Sweden: Sparbankernas Riksförbund (Swedish Association of Savings Banks and Savings Bank Foundations); Swedbank
- Switzerland: Frankfurter Bankgesellschaft Schweiz AG
- Ukraine: OTP Bank (as part of OTP Bank Group)
