= World Savings Day =

Worldwide holiday on October 31

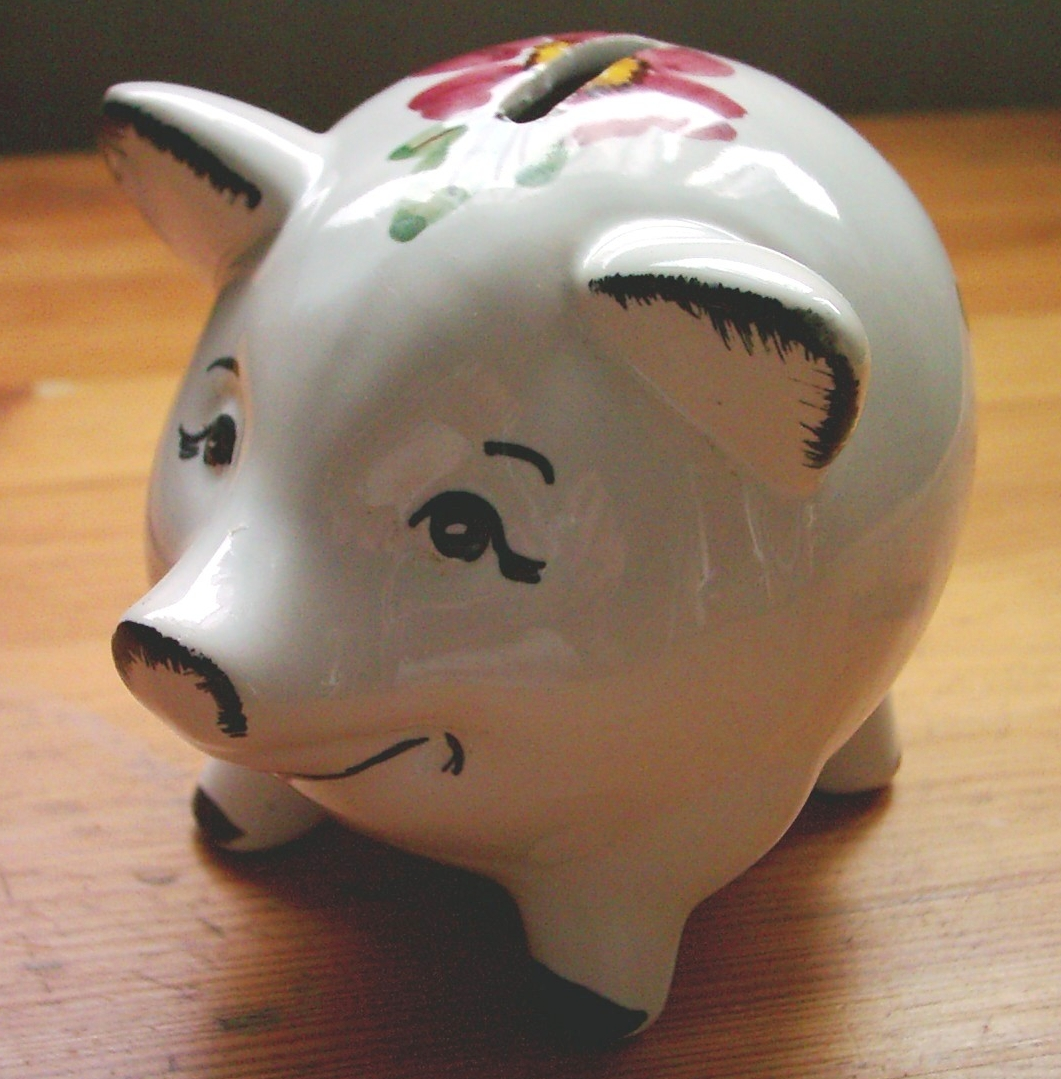
Porcelain Piggy Bank (Germany, from the 1970s)

The World Savings Day was established on October 31, 1924, during the 1st International Savings Bank Congress (World Society of Savings Banks) in Milan, Italy. The Italian Professor Filippo Ravizza declared this day the "International Saving Day" on the last day of the congress. In the resolutions of the Thrift Congress it was decided that 'World Thrift Day' should be a day devoted to the promotion of savings all over the world. In their efforts to promote thrift, the savings banks also worked with the support of the schools, the clergy, as well as cultural, sports, professional, and women's associations.

Representatives of 29 countries wanted to bring to mind the "thought of saving" to the worldwide public and its relevance to the economy and the individual. The World Savings Day is usually held on October 31 except in countries where this day is a public holiday, since the idea is for the banks to be open, so that the people are able to transfer their savings into their account.

The idea of World Thrift Day was not created spontaneously. There had been examples of other days committed to the idea of saving money in order to gain a higher standard of life and to secure the economy; for example, in Spain, the first national thrift day was celebrated in 1921, or in the United States. In other countries, such as Germany, the peoples' confidence in savings had to be restored since many of them had lost their savings in the German monetary reform of 1923.

After the Second World War, World Thrift Day continued and reached the peak of its popularity in the years between 1955 and 1970. It practically became a veritable tradition in certain countries. In Austria, for instance, the official mascot of saving, the so-called 'Sparefroh' (lit. 'Happy Saver', or rather "save happily!") reached a higher degree of brand awareness than the republic's President and even a street was named after him. In the 1970s, the 'Sparefroh-Journal', an educational magazine for younger people, reached a circulation of 400,000 copies.

Nowadays the focus of the banks that organise the World Savings Day is on developing countries, where many people are unbanked. Savings banks play an important role in enhancing savings in these countries with certain campaigns and initiatives such as working with non-governmental organisations in order to double the number of savings accounts held by the poor.

== WSBI World Savings Day campaigns ==
The World Savings and Retail Banks Institute, the world's oldest and largest global banking association, launches every year a global World Savings Day campaign to promote the importance of savings and honor the memory of its founding father, Filippo Ravizza, and the First International Thrift Congress in Milan.

Marking WSBI's centennial celebration, the campaign in 2024 reflected on the history of saving money, under the theme "A Century of Savings: From Piggy Bank to Digital Wallets."

In 2025, the campaign challenged the traditional perception of savings, focusing on its symbolic meaning in people's lives: "This is not a savings account. It’s far greater than this."

The 2026 edition, “AI advises. Human decides,” of World Savings Day reunites the campaigns from the past two years. It places tradition and values into perspective and calls for focusing on real efforts leading to a secure future: savings.

== Trivia ==
- In Germany World Savings Day is held on the last business day before October 31 since this is a public holiday in some States (Reformation Day).
- In Italy, Poste Italiane issued an ordinary stamp in 2024 dedicated to World Savings Day, on the centenary of the first edition.
