= Frankfurter Bankgesellschaft =

Bank in Germany

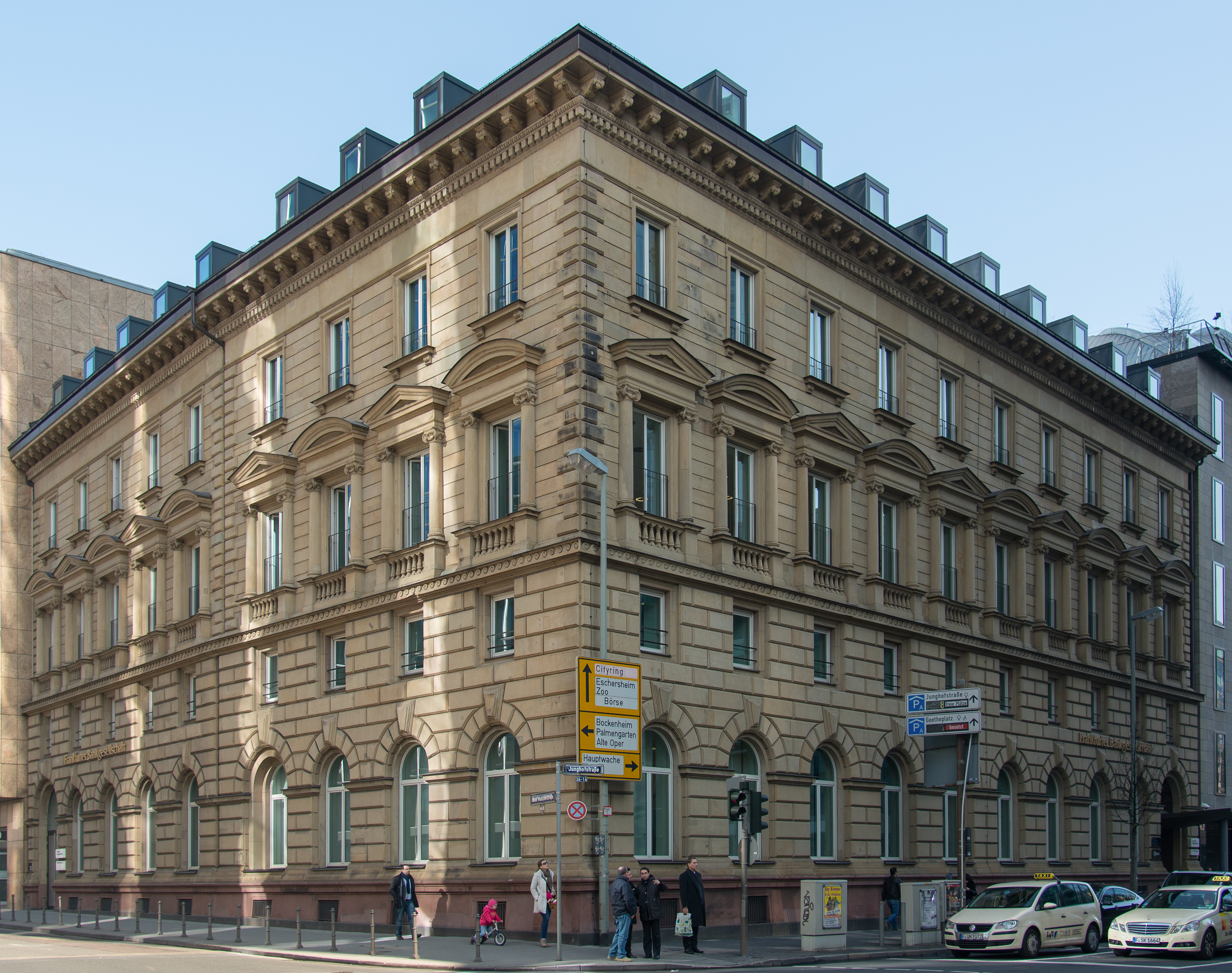
- Head office building in Junghofstrasse 26 in Frankfurt
- Company type: Subsidiary
- Industry: Financial services
- Predecessor: Deutsche Spar- und Kreditbank
- Founded: 1969; 57 years ago
- Headquarters: Frankfurt, Germany
- Products: Private bank
- Owner: Helaba
- Website: www.frankfurter-bankgesellschaft.com

Frankfurter Bankgesellschaft Group (lit. 'Group of the banking company of Frankfurt') is a banking group based in Frankfurt with operations in Germany and Zurich, Switzerland. Originally established in 1969 under the name Bankenunion AG, it is a fully owned subsidiary of Helaba and thus a member of the Sparkassen-Finanzgruppe for which it serves as the group's main private bank. It includes the former operations of LB Swiss Privatbank, a Swiss private bank founded in 1955, and was the second-largest German-owned private bank in Switzerland as of the early 2020s.

== History ==
The origins of Frankfurter Bankgesellschaft go back to the rapid development of banking services in Germany in the 1960s. In 1965, the private bank Merck Finck established a majority-owned subsidiary in Munich, Deutsche Spar- und Kreditbank (DSK Bank), which in turn grew a network of branches in the areas of Frankfurt and Hamburg as well as Munich.

In 1968, DSK Bank transferred its branches in the Hamburg area to Nordbank AG, a joint venture with the local Neue Sparkasse von 1864. In 1969, it transferred its branches in Frankfurt to the Bankenunion AG, similarly created as a new entity jointly owned by DSK Bank (30 percent), the local Frankfurter Sparkasse (30 percent), the nearby Württembergische Landessparkasse (30 percent), and Nordbank (10 percent).

In August 2000, Bankenunion AG changed its name to Frankfurter Bankgesellschaft AG after having acquired the corresponding naming rights of a namesake bank founded in 1899. It subsequently expanded its customer base to include wealthy private customers. By then, Frankfurter Sparkasse and Banca Carige each held 47.5 percent of the company, with the remaining 5 percent being held by Südtiroler Sparkasse.

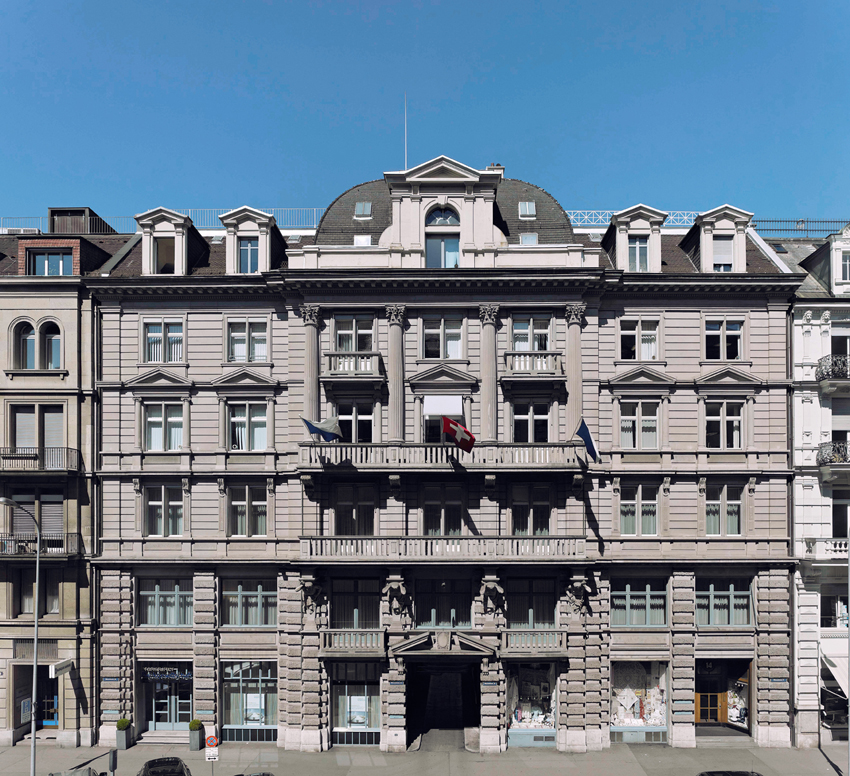
Swiss head office, Börsenstrasse 16 in Zurich

In 2007, the Frankfurter Sparkasse, by then fully owned by Helaba, became the sole owner of Frankfurter Bankgesellschaft. In 2010, it sold it to LB Swiss Privatbank AG, a private bank originally founded in 1955, purchased by BayernLB in 1991 then in stages by Helaba in 2001 and 2010. LB Swiss Privatbank AG renamed itself Frankfurter Bankgesellschaft (Schweiz) AG in the course of that reorganization. On 1 December 2023, a newly founded holding company based in Frankfurt took over both the German and Swiss entities of the Frankfurter Bankgesellschaft Group. The German entity, Frankfurter Bankgesellschaft (Deutschland) AG, has established branches in Düsseldorf in 2018 and Hamburg in 2019, and offices in Munich in 2018 and Saarbrücken in 2021.

The Frankfurter Bankgesellschaft Group cooperates with over 80 percent of German savings banks and complements their range of services in private banking. It also owns a multi-family office, the only such service provider in the Sparkassen-Finanzgruppe, and controls IMAP M&A Consultants AG, a mergers and acquisitions advisory firm that targets medium-sized companies.

== See also ==
- Bankgesellschaft Berlin
- List of banks in Germany
