= Spanish Confederation of Savings Banks =

The Spanish Confederation of Savings Banks (Spanish: Confederación Española de Cajas de Ahorros (CECA)) is the representative body of savings banks in Spain.

Spanish savings banks developed a vertical alliance structured through a "central" savings bank or wholesaler of retail finance. This kind of institution dated to the early 20th century and was pioneered by Skopbank in Finland (established in 1908), Fellesbanken in Norway and ICCRI in Italy (both established in 1919).

Central savings banks were membership owned and they had little influence on members’ strategic or operational matters. Their aim was to service the needs of participating institutions often in a representative capacity but also in areas where necessary economies of scale were beyond the individual member.

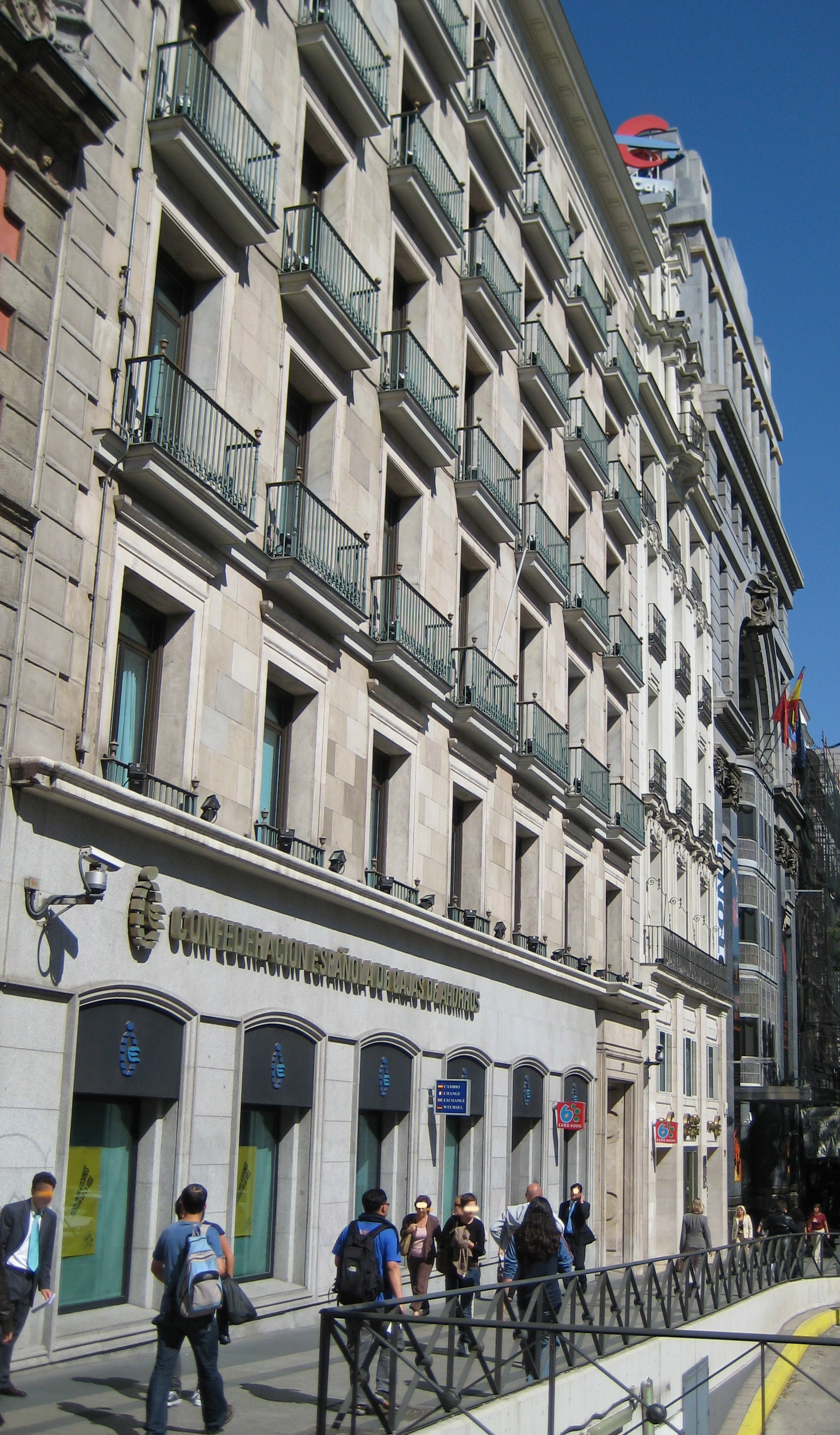
Main headquarters of the Confederation at Alcalá Street in Madrid. Behind, there is a branch of Ibercaja

There are two precedents to the formation of the Confederation of Spanish Savings Banks (Confederación Española de Cajas de Ahorros or commonly known as CECA), namely regional associations and the Savings Banks Credit Institute

== Regional associations of savings banks in Spain ==
Between 1921 and 1939, most Spanish savings banks remained local institutions but the biggest savings banks started to expand within their province and across adjacent areas. In the course of the first quarter of the century competition had increased for the savings banks from two sources. First, government-owned banks were established. Secondly, private commercial banks developed national branch networks by capitalising on greater balance sheet strength.

The process of banking cartelisation took place in conjunction with the regulatory change and the conflicts generated by the governmental policies. The situation created after the first banking law of 1921 and the simultaneous creation of the banking cartel (Banking Control Council–Consejo Superior Bancario or CSB), generated a series of defence mechanisms put in place by the savings banks. The most important of these was the creation of regional federations of savings banks.

Bank federations in Spain emerged as a response to regulatory changes that modified the otherwise equal framework for business under which private commercial and savings banks could compete. Led by the Basque-Navarre federation in 1924, the Galician Federation, the Levante Federation, the Catalan-Aragonese-Balearic Federation, the Western Federation, the Castilian Federation, the Asturian Federation, and the Federation of Savings Banks in Andalusia. These were then to amalgamate in 1928 and create the Confederation of Spanish Savings Banks (Confederación Española de Cajas de Ahorros, abbreviated as CECA).

== Savings Banks Credit Institute ==
Alongside CECA the central or main clearing bank for Spanish savings banks developed. This was called the Instituto de Crédito de las Cajas de Ahorro or ICCA (The Savings Banks Credit Institute).

The ICCA was created in 1933 to enable the pooling of financial resources in order to fund or syndicate social-charter investments as well as establishing a lender of last resort scheme for the savings banks. In 1962, ICCA became the savings banks’ formal representative at the Ministry of Finance and turned into the prime instrument for government control over the savings banks. ICCA formally disappeared in 1971, its control and supervision duties were absorbed by the Bank of Spain and its clearing functions by CECA.

By 1970 the CECA had attained considerable credibility as a savings bank association. The reforms that the Confederation had undergone at the start of the seventies prepared the institution for future tasks. The CECA, as a collectively owned central operator became the main recipient of savings banks’ outsourcing strategies (including applications of information technology) and clearing activities. The gradual removal of regulatory barriers allowed the CECA, in periods of strong growth of the Spanish economy, to offer their associates access to shared resources including clearing activities, with the end result of achieving economies of scale that allowed independent savings banks the development of previously non-existent competitive capabilities.

== Modern history ==
CECA extended the savings banks’ domestic and international influence and the ability to lobby on their behalf. Besides its attempts to counterbalance the commercial banks' cartel (CSB), CECA was used by the Spanish government to co-ordinate social charter investment (‘Obra Social’). From 1939, CECA also helped to implement a ‘principle of territoriality’, through which savings banks' business was restricted to a single province.

At the end of the 1980s all CECA members remained legally and functionally independent and, contrary to other European experiences, the alliance had not grown into a single franchise. Although each savings bank had an independent treasury department, the risk-diversification of the system meant that as a group, the savings banks’ cost of funds was as much as one per cent below that of commercial banks. This advantage continued throughout the 1980s and emerged during a period (circa 1962 to 1977) in which the savings banks’ collaborative strategies evolved to reduce their competitive disadvantage relative to private commercial (i.e. full-service) banks.

In this way, by the mid 1990s the co-operative mechanisms were sufficiently adapted to face market globalization, competition, ever-narrowing financial margins in banking and an accelerated pace in technological change. The savings banks were able to delve deeper into efficiency and cost reduction, and hence improved their competitive advantage viz other financial intermediaries and benefited clearly from economies of scale.
