= Caja General de Ahorros de Canarias =

Spanish saving bank

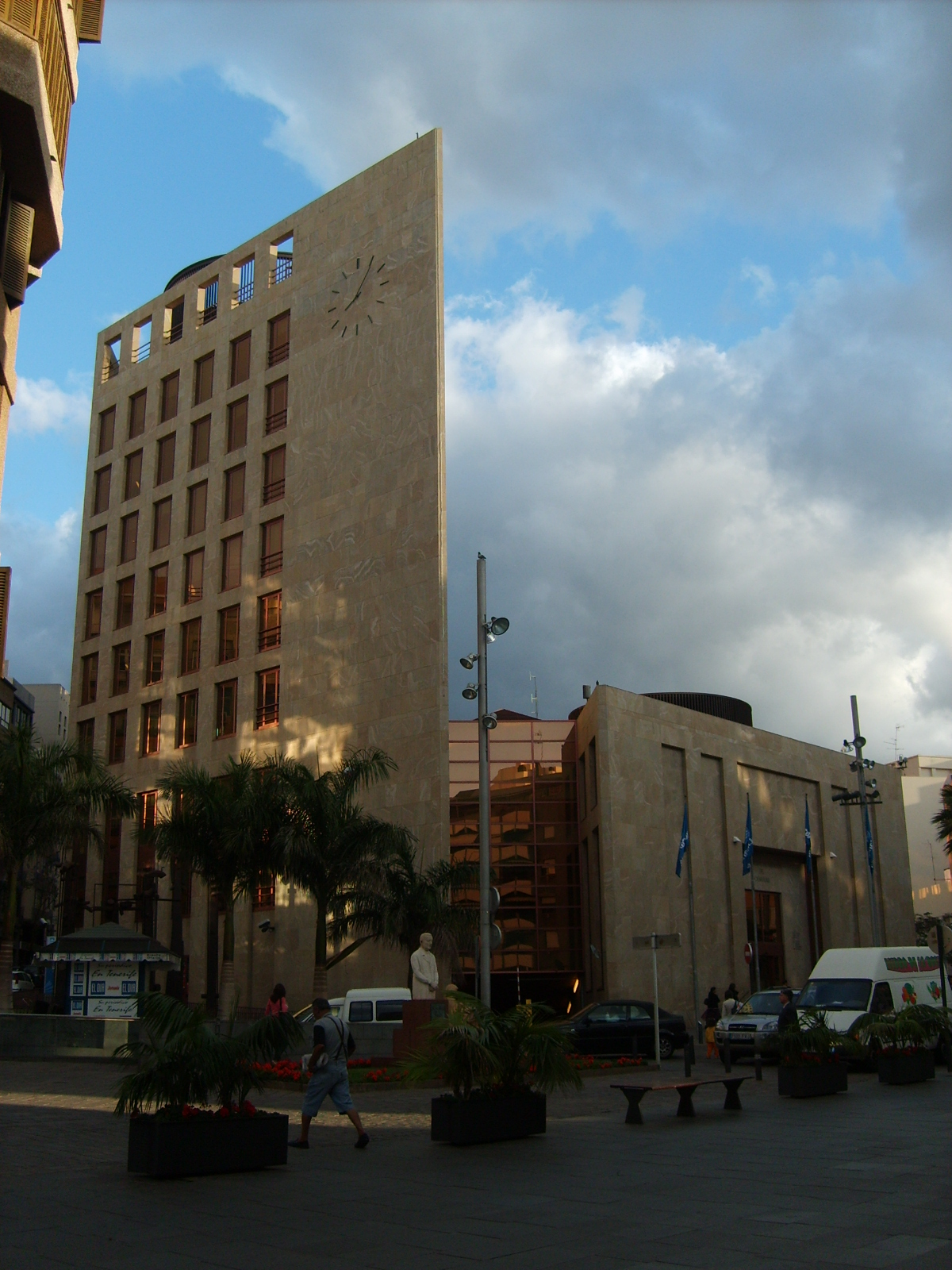
CajaCanarias, old headquarters in Santa Cruz de Tenerife

Caja General de Ahorros de Canarias known as Caja Canarias was a Spanish saving bank in the Canary Islands. It was taken over by CaixaBank in 2012.

== History ==
It was founded on March 23, 1984, as the union of Caja General de Ahorros y Monte de Piedad de Santa Cruz de Tenerife and Caja de Ahorros Insular de La Palma. It was headquartered in Santa Cruz de Tenerife and was the first financial institution in the Canary Islands. In 2011, it had over 1,600 direct employees and a network of more than 200 offices throughout the Canary islands.

It was merged into CaixaBank in 2012 as part of a government institutional protection system (SIP) that was used as a consolidation mechanism for credit institutions in Spain.

== See also ==
- List of banks in Spain
