= Savings bank (Spain) =

Type of financial institution in Spain

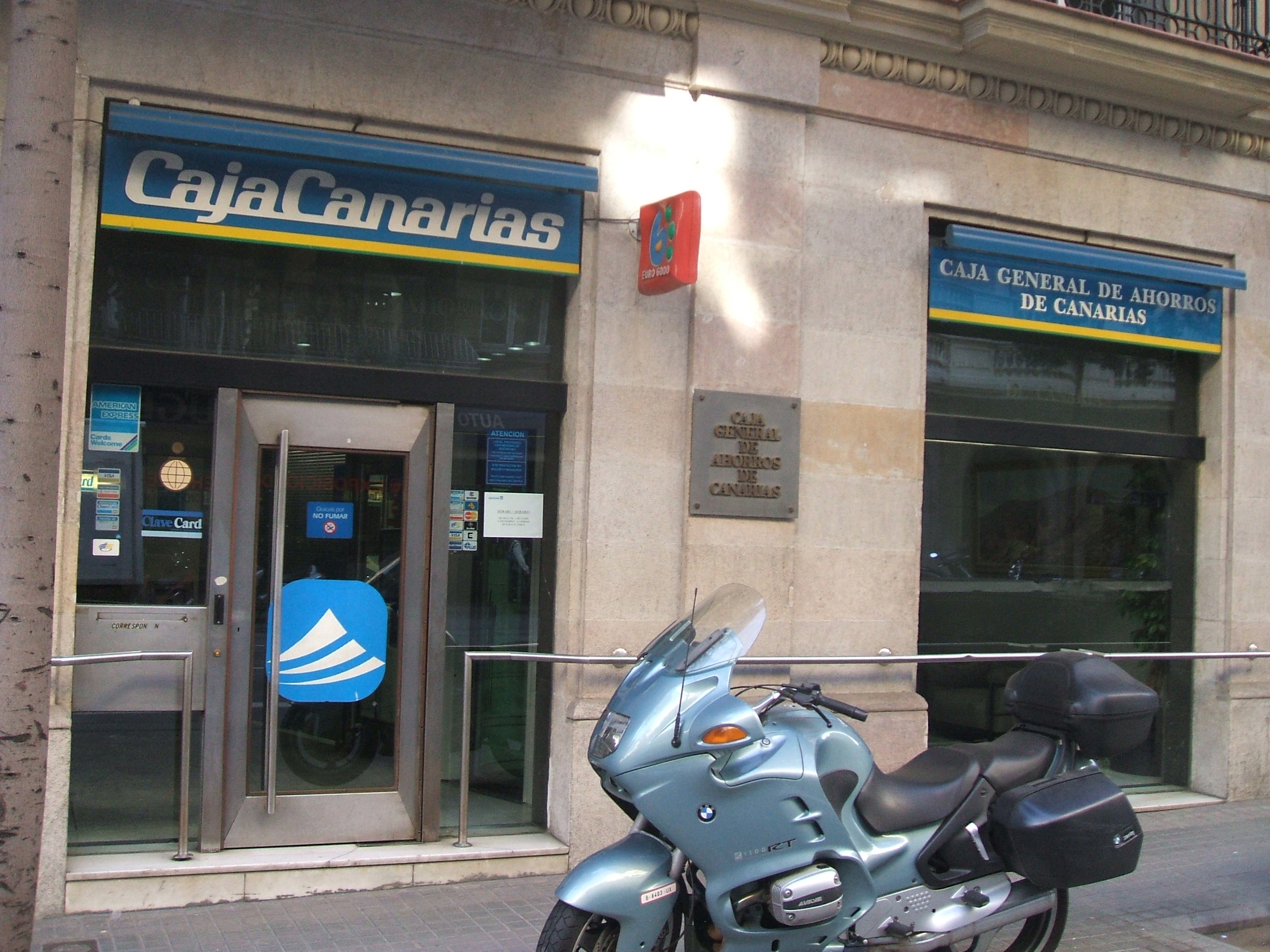
Caja General de Ahorros de Canarias in Barcelona.

In Spain, a savings bank (Spanish: caja de ahorros or informally caja, Catalan: caixa d'estalvis, also caixa, Galician: caixa de aforros, informally caixa, Basque: aurrezki kutxa) is a financial institution that specializes in accepting savings deposits and granting loans. Spanish banks fall into two categories: Privately owned banks (bancos) and government owned banks (cajas—literally pay office, or pay desk). The original aim was to encourage thrift among the very poor, but they evolved to compete with and rival commercial banks.

Over time, most cajas colluded with regional political establishments to create a self-serving system of unscrupulous financing for regional governments provided by politically stuffed savings banks' boards which, in turn, thrived in what has been defined as "a culture of greed, cronyism and political meddling". This system was exposed after the 2008 financial crisis. As a result, out of the 45 cajas in existence in 2007, only two have survived in their initial form. The rest were absorbed by banks, dismantling in effect the cajas model in Spain.

Their trade association is the Spanish Confederation of Savings Banks (Confederación Española de Cajas de Ahorro or CECA).

== Emergence and growth ==
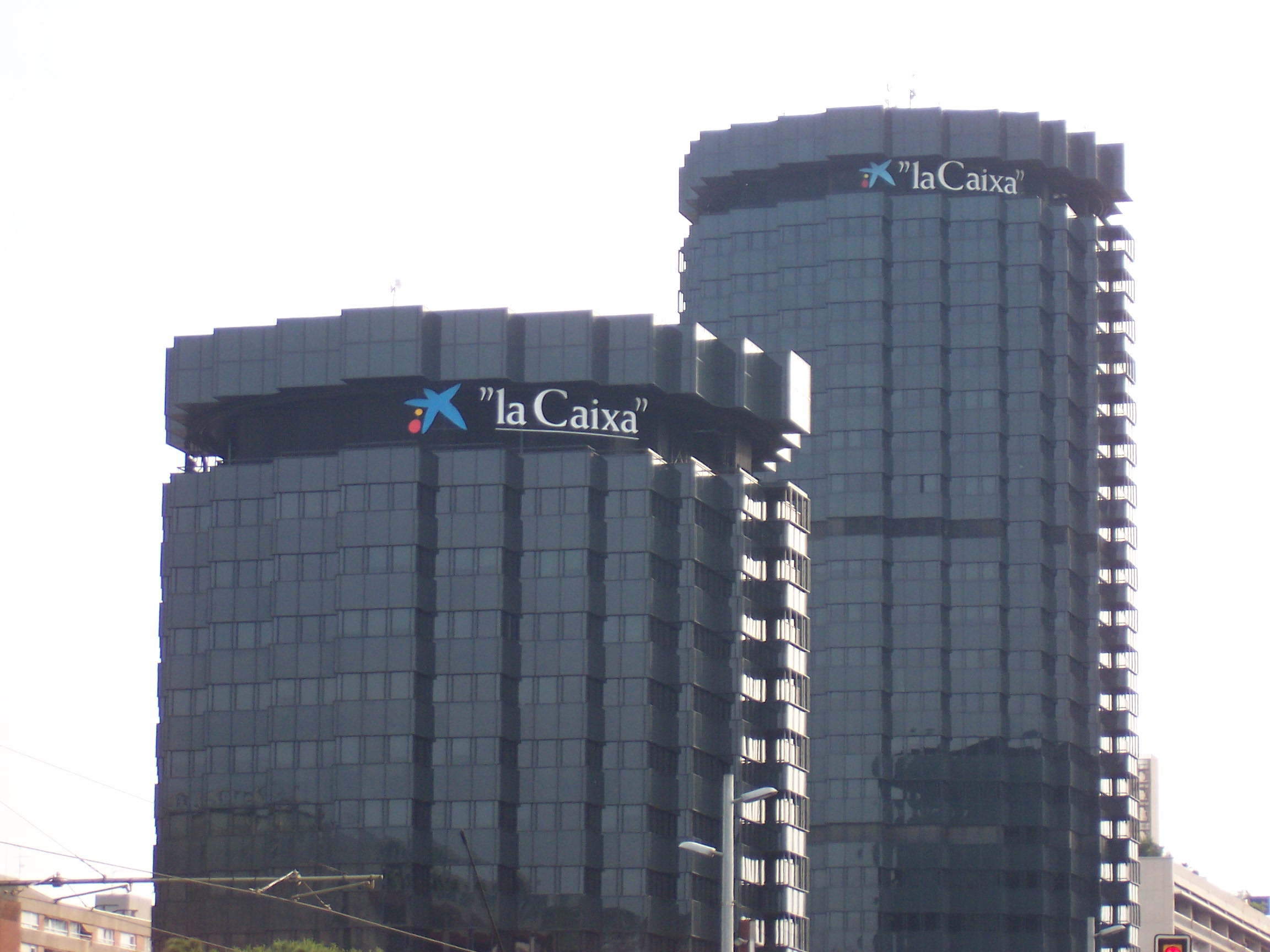
Towers of La Caixa in Barcelona.

European countries that adopted the Scottish savings bank model early on were those in which traditional Protestant values of self-help and the ideas of Jeremy Bentham and Thomas Malthus were particularly influential. Such was not the case in Portugal and Spain where savings banks started rather late (1836 and 1839, respectively) and followed the French model (established in 1818).

The Minister of the Interior Diego de Medrano introduced regulations by Royal Order on April 3, 1835, he was the first to authorize the establishment of savings banks in Spain. This piece of legislation allowed the establishment of independent non-profit-orientated institutions, which had to be financed by their own resources. However, it was not clear how individual institutions would access these resources, though there were loose references to an expectation that capital would be raised as the well-off supplied financial resources as charitable donations.

The Spanish government clearly displayed a preference for initial investment to come from the private sector while individual institutions would provide for some form of guarantee to secure funds held in deposit. Financially, however, the model of 1835 was very weak. Hence, in 1839 a new piece of legislation introduced the "French model" where individual savings banks were linked with a "Mount of Piety".

Unlike the Scottish savings banks, French-style savings banks created an initial fund to cover set-up costs and unexpected losses through donations and setting up a charity. After this the banks became autonomous with a governing board of six to 20 principals (working pro bono) holding responsibility for the strategic direction and overall affairs of the banks. Both in Portugal and Spain the most common source of the set-up fund was the local Mount of Piety. These Mounts of Piety (a literal translation from "Montes de Piedad") were early modern charitable institutions where advances were made against some kind of collateral in pawn (usually, jewellery or clothes). Consequently, Spanish savings banks accepted low-value and low-volume savings in deposit and, in turn, placed these funds in the ‘Mounts of Piety’ so they could make small loans to underprivileged classes.

Like their counterparts in Scotland and France, Spanish savings banks briefly placed excess deposits at a government owned institution (Caja General de Consignaciones, 1852–1868). This portfolio strategy was part of a change in government policy looking for greater intervention in the business of Spanish savings banks as well as providing financial aid to the recently created Caja de Dépositos y Consignaciones. However, the change in strategy was short lived due to the poor quality of government bonds in the 19th century. Instead, Spanish savings banks increasingly used deposits exclusively to finance the activities of the ‘Mount of Piety’.

A turning point in the history of Spanish savings banks came after the restoration of the monarchy in 1874. Until then regulation and government policy around savings banks had closely followed the interventionist French model. As was the case in Britain, this approach limited the operations of savings banks. Legislation introduced in 1880, opened the way for the growth of Spanish savings banks.

The Act of 1880 had clear objectives for the running of savings banks. At the same time, a number of its areas lacked precision in the newly introduced regulation. However, this lack of precision facilitated the growth and development of savings banks in Spain. In particular, freedom (i.e., lack of detailed regulation) regarding investment policies created diversification and growth of assets at a greater rate than counterparts elsewhere in Europe. From the time the Act of 1880 was published until the end of the 19th century, the number of entities doubled from 26 in 1880 to 66 in 1905, while the sum of cash and assets held as deposit increased by four percent from 12 per cent of total savings in Spain in 1880 to 16 percent in 1905.

Alongside the savings banks, in 1890 and following German ideas to promote agriculture, co-operative banks (cajas rurales) emerged in rural areas. Most of these banks were established in the countryside under the auspices of the syndicalist, co-operativist movements and the Catholic church. However, these intermediaries grew in size until after 1920. Their impact, number, and asset size were always dwarfed when compared with the achievements of the savings banks and as a result, the cajas rurales were eventually absorbed by the savings banks.

== Performance in the first half of the 20th Century ==
Between 1870 and 1900 the financial strength of savings banks increased significantly. During this period, the pawn and emergency loan operations of the Mount of Piety were unable to absorb all deposits made at the savings bank. Unlike savings banks in other European countries, Spanish savings banks were not required to purchase government debt with excess resources. Instead, savings banks began making short-term advances and issuing mortgages directly to the public. Initially they issued short-term loans using public and industrial goods in stock as collateral.

Between 1862 and 1867, 40 per cent of the amount of the loans was granted against pawned items and the remaining 60 per cent was secured by stock. Diversification continued and by the outbreak of World War I, Spanish savings banks were readily issuing mortgages directly to retail customers. The Mortgage Act of 4 June 1908 contributed to the development of this phenomenon as it pioneered exemption from having to pay different forms of capital gains and corporation's tax for mortgages issued by the Mount of Piety.

Most early-established savings banks had located in the biggest urban centres, and grew in financial strength through retained surpluses. By the turn of the century most assets were held in the savings banks located in seaports and industrial cities. Between 1900 and 1925 the number of Spanish savings banks tripled to 150 banks, although no major change in regulation policy or the banks' business portfolio had taken place.

Between 1900 and 1914 the Spanish banking sector experienced a sharp increase in its levels of activity. Some banks also observed increased efficiency and enhanced competitiveness. Assets of private commercial banks grew significantly due to both the repatriation of capital due to the colonial crisis and World War I, in which Spain remained neutral. These circumstances favoured geographical expansion throughout Spain of regional private commercial banks based in Madrid and the Basque Country.

In 1921 the first banking law was enacted, and that year the Consejo Superior Bancario or CSB (High Banking Council) was established by private commercial banks. The role of the CSB was to co-ordinate the actions of private commercial banks as their economic power became more important. By the beginning of the Spanish Civil War (1936–1939), private commercial banks dominated financial markets, and were organised through the cartel that built around the Consejo Superior Bancario and supervised by the Ministry of Employment, Commerce and Industry (and later on by the Ministry of Employment and Welfare).

During the 1920s assets in savings banks started to abandon their charitable nature and gradually turned into broader financial intermediation institutions. Growth was limited because competitive pressure to find new opportunities within the private commercial banking sector resulted in a policy of expansion of the geographic scope of retail branches networks and diversification of sources of business. These strategies brought the competitive challenge of private commercial banks to markets being serviced by savings banks.

Individual savings banks enhanced their profile within their local communities as greater asset size allowed them to increase the funding of social welfare- and agricultural projects (Obra Social, a practice that is nowadays part of their corporate social responsibility). However, a new approach to how people saved and to the working environment of savings banks came about as a result of legislation enacted in 1926, 1929, and 1933 during the dictatorship of General Primo de Rivera, a period in which the economic policy was marked by an authoritarian corporatism, and the Spanish Republic brought.

These regulatory changes brought to an end the savings banks' charitable nature. They also turned their profits into the main source of funds (and therefore to support the "Obra Social"). Regulatory innovations put to an end the broad discretion that the directors of savings banks previously had and established specific and detailed guidelines whose use (and abuse) grew during the dictatorship of General Francisco Franco.

== Regulatory burden ==
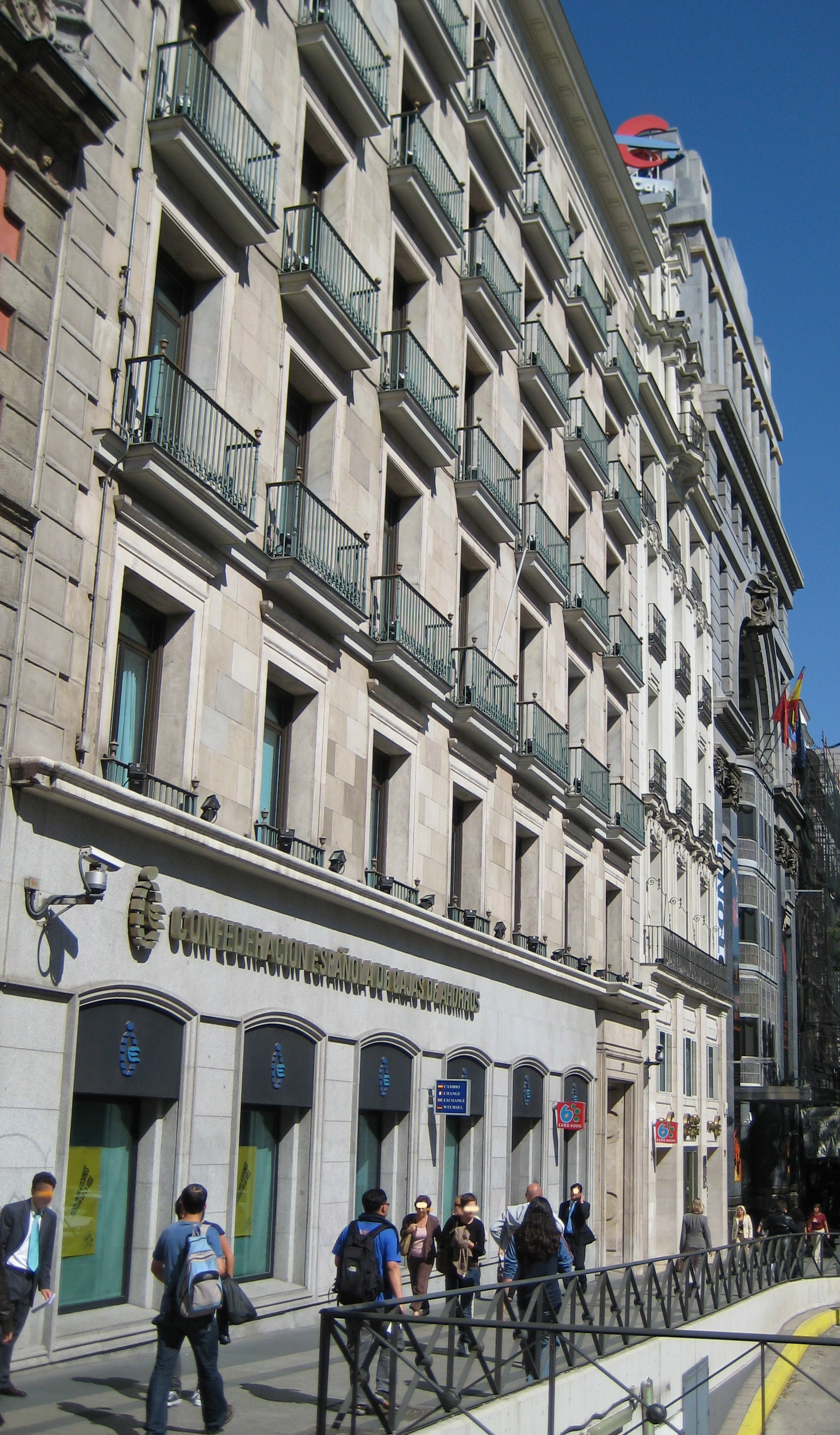
The headquarters of Confederación Española de Cajas de Ahorros (Spanish Confederation of Savings Banks) in Madrid.

The Franco regime (1939–1975) reaffirmed the pre-eminence of private commercial banks within the Spanish financial system and introduced regulation that handicapped traditional savings banks. The supervision of the savings banks was transferred from the Ministry of Interior to the Bank of Spain.

The first episode of regulatory change for the savings banks saw increased regulation, and the overwhelming majority of new savings banks that were established between 1939 and 1977 were set up by local and central governments (with some notable exceptions like the co-operativist Caja Laboral). The Franco regime continued implementing a practice developed during the 1920s called the principle of territoriality, meaning that the business of each savings bank was restricted to its home province.

This principle remained an informal arrangement until it was enacted into law in 1964. At the same time, the increasing asset base of the savings banks prompted the Finance Ministry to start regulating the sources and applications of their funds. As a result, the Finance Ministry directed a growing proportion of the assets of savings banks to finance public debentures and private banks' short-term liabilities, with the added result that the policy significantly reduced funds available for agricultural projects and other traditional lending activities.

The second episode of regulatory change for the savings banks dates to the last stage of the Franco regime, when attempts were made to ease the regulatory burden on Spanish savings banks (particularly in 1962 and 1964). Nonetheless, until 1974 the savings banks remained outside the Spanish clearinghouse system and had access to only a restricted business portfolio.

However, under the Fuentes Quintana Reform (1977) the competitive environments for savings and private banks started to converge. The reform gave savings banks strong incentives to modernise their infrastructure and develop new skills. In 1977, for example, the Bank of Spain authorised the first automated teller machine for the savings banks and by 1996, their combined network had 14,169 machines, the biggest network in Spain and the third largest in the world.

== Collapse of the cajas ==
After the 2008 financial crisis, the Spanish real estate market collapsed, taking Spain into its very own financial crisis.

In over 150 years of financial history up until the 21st century, crises had affected commercial and investment banks, but not cajas. The reasons why the cajas imploded can be traced back to a 1985 act which altered the composition of the governing bodies by trusting the boards of directors to political parties and trade unions. The 2008 financial crisis unveiled what has been defined as "a culture of greed, cronyism and political meddling" within the cajas, including boards stuffed with political placements generally incapable of analysing the banks' books, often limiting themselves to rubber-stamp decisions. Board members typically rewarded themselves with well-paid positions, luxury foreign trips and soft loans.

After the bust, out of the 45 cajas in existence at the start of the crisis in 2007, only two (Caixa Ontinyent and Colonya Caixa Pollença) survived in their initial form; the rest were either taken over by other banks or by the government or forced to merge and taken over by the government, wiping out existing equity holders. However, the former cajas continue to exist, in the form of "banking foundations" or "ordinary foundations", that have seen their actions restricted to social and cultural incentives and sponsoring, and most of their financial means converted into shareholdings into the subsequent "cajabancas" (or banks that have emerged from the former cajas).

== See also ==
- Bankia
- Caixa Catalunya
- Caja de Ahorros del Mediterráneo
- Caja Madrid
- La Caixa
- Savings bank

== Sources ==
- Aguilar Piñal, F. (1975). Los montepíos laicos en el siglo XVIII. Homenaje a Don Agustín Millares Carlo Vol. 1. J. Simón Díaz. Las Palmas.
- Anton Ramirez, B. (1876). Montes de Piedad y Cajas de Ahorros. Reseña histórica y crítica. Madrid, Aribau y Cia.
- Ash, N. (1987). Cajas Cash in by Concentration. Euromoney (Supplement). Sep.
- Bátiz-Lazo, B. (2004). "Strategic Alliances and Competitive Edge: Insights from Spanish and UK Banking Histories." Business History 46(1): 23–56. Strategic alliances & competitive edge: Insights from Spanish & UK banking histories
- Bátiz-Lazo, B. and Del Angel, G. (2003). "Competitive Collaboration and Market Contestability: Cases in Mexican and UK banking (1945-75)." Accounting, Business and Financial History 13(3): 1-30.
- Caballero Míguez, G. (2004). "De la jerarquía al mercado: la reforma financiera española desde la nueva economía institucional." Papeles de Economía Española 101.
- Caminal, R., et al. (1990). Competition in Spanish Banking. European Banking in the 1990s. J. Dermine. Oxford.
- Canals, J. (1994). Competitive Strategies in European Banking. Oxford.
- Comín, F. (2003). "La Confederación Española de Cajas de Ahorros: asociación representativa, caja de cajas y proveedora de servicios (1928-2003)." Economistas 98: 36–45.
- Comín, F. and Torres, E. (2005). "La confederación española de cajas de ahorro y el desarrollo de la red de servicios financieros de las cajas en el siglo XX." Papeles de Economía Española 105-106: 48–65.
- Cuadras Morató, X., et al. (2002). "Productividad, competencia e innovación en la banca privada española, 1900-1914." Revista de Historia Económica 20(2).
- Davies, B. (1987). Thinking Big for Small Savers: Interview with José Joaquín Sancho Dronda. Euromoney (Supplement). Sep.: 2.
- de la Hucha, F. and Antón, J. A. (1991). "Situación actual de las cajas de ahorro europeas." Papeles de Economía Española 46.
- Domenech, R. (1993). "Especialisación productiva y resultados de las cajas de ahorro españolas (1986-1991)." Papeles de Economía Española (Perspectivas del Sistema Financiero) 43.
- Duet, D. (1983). Les Caisses d'Epargne francaises et leur acitivité. Tradition ou évolution (1818–1981). Paris, Presses Universitaires de France.
- Fanjul, O. and Maravall, F. (1985). La efficiencia del sistema bancario español. Madrid.
- Forniés Casals, J. F. (1991). "Interpretación básica de la historia de las cajas de ahorros españolas." Papeles de Economía Española 46.
- Garcia Delgado, J. L. (1984). La Banca Privada: De la crísis colonial a la consolidación de los años veinte. Historia de España, Vol. 37. R. Menéndez Pidal and J. M. Jover Zamora. Madrid.
- García Delgado, J. L. (1985). "Notas sobre el intervencionismo econòmico del primer franquismo." Revista de Historia Económica 1: 135–46.
- Gonzalo Gonzalez, L. (1981). El tesoro público y la Caja General de Depósitos (1852–1868). Madrid, Instituto de Estudios Fiscales.
- Grávalos, J. J. (1993). Una nueva estrategia para las cajas de ahorros: La fusión tecnológica. El sistema financiero español ante el Mercado Único. L. Fernández de la Buelga and I. Ezquiaga. Madrid.
- Grimá i Terré, J. D. and von Löhneysen, E. (1991). "Nueva estructura organizativa para bancos y cajas universales." Papeles de Economía Española 49.
- Gueslin, A. (1989). "L'invention des Caisses d'épargne en France: une grande utopie libérale." Revue Historique 57(2): 391–409.
- López, R. (1993). Las cajas de ahorro en los noventa. El sistema financiero español ante el Mercado Único. L. Fernández de la Buelga and I. Ezquiaga. Madrid.
- Maixé, J. C. (2005). "Cajas de ahorro y desarrollo regional. Aspectos diferenciales de los sistemas financieros gallego y asturiano." Papeles de Economía Española 105-6(254-273).
- Maixé, J. C., et al. (2003). El ahorro de los Gallegos. Orígnes e historia de Caixa Galicia (1876–2002),. A Coruña, Fundación Caixa Galicia.
- Martínez Soto, A. P. (2001). "La tela de araña. Mercados informales de financiación agraria, usura y crédito hipotecario en la región de Murcia (1850-1939)." Areas 21: 185–220.
- Martínez Soto, A. P. (2003). "Las cajas de ahorros españolas en el siglo XIX. Los orígenes del sistema (1839-1875)." Papeles de Economía Española 97(174-204).
- Maudos, J. (1991). El impacto del cambio tecnológico en el sistema bancario: el cajero automático. Intstituto Valenciano de Investigaciones Económicas (WP EC-91-10). Valencia.
- Medel Cámara, B. (1991). "La reforma de la Confederación Española de Cajas de Ahorro." Papeles de Economía Española 46.
- Montero, M. (1983). Bases para la investigación del préstamo y la usura en la sociedad del siglo XIX. Madrid, Confederación Española de Cajas de Ahorro.
- Revell, J. (1991). "Consecuencias de los cambios recientes en las cajas de ahorro de Europa occidental." Papeles de Economía Española 46: 191.
- Ros Pérez, F. (1996). Las cajas de ahorros en España: Evolución y regimen jurídico. Murcia, Fernando Ros Pèrez.
- Sánchez Sáez, J. M. and Sastre de Miguel, T. (1995). ¿Es el tamaño un factor explicativo de las differencias entre entidades bancarias? Servicio de Estudios Banco de España No. DT9512. Madrid.
- Serrano, J. M. and Costas, A. (1990). La reforma del marco institucional. Economía de la transición y de la democracia. J. L. Garcia Delgado. Madrid: 505–25.
- Tedde de Lorca, P. (1991). "La naturaleza de las cajas de ahorros: Sus raíces históricas." Papeles de Economía Española 46(5).
- Tortella, G. (1974a). Las magnitudes monetarias y sus determinantes. La banca española en la Restauración (vol 1). G. Tortella. Madrid, Banco de España.
- Tortella, G. (1974b). Una serie de cuentas de ahorro no bancarias 1874–1914. La banca española en la Restauración (vol 2). G. Tortella. Madrid, Banco de España: 541–46.
