= Caja Navarra =

Spanish savings bank

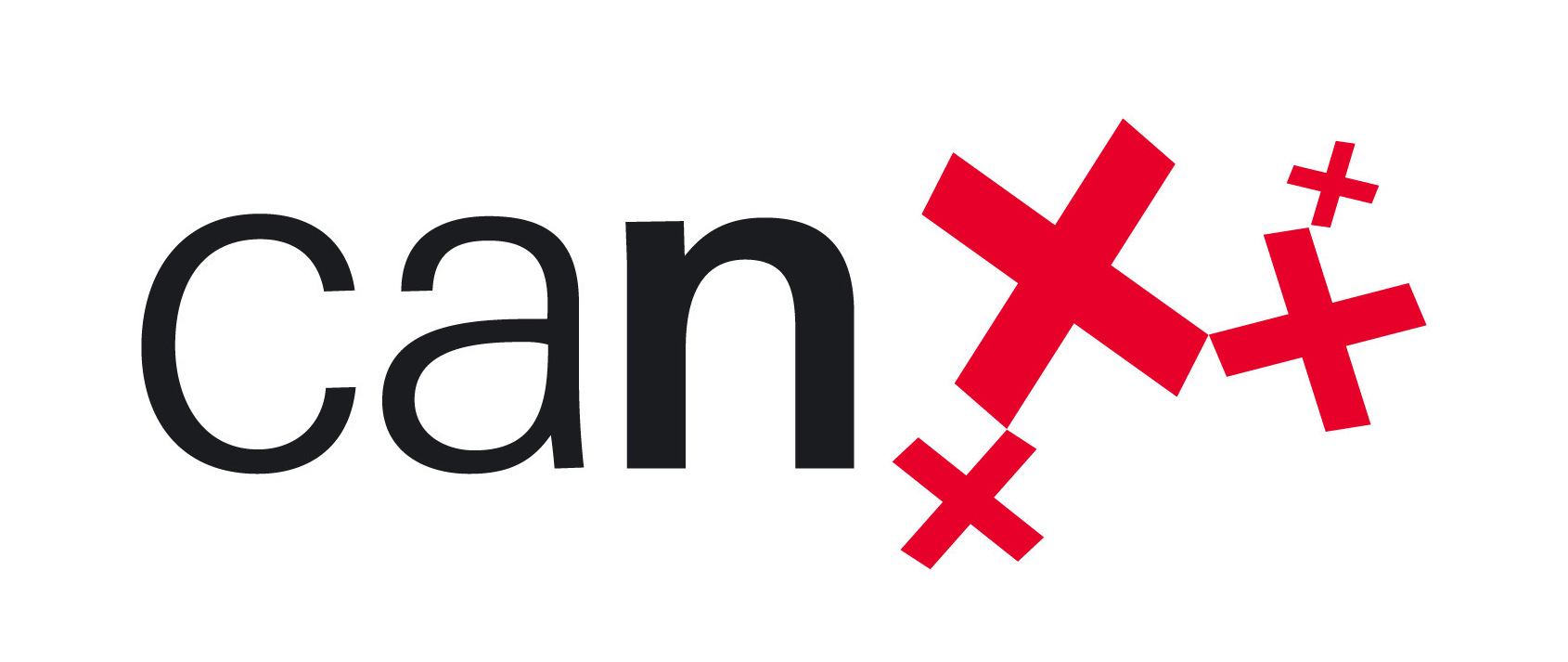
- Type: Caja de Ahorros
- Industry: Banking
- Founded: 1921
- Headquarters: Pamplona, Spain
- Key people: Enrique Goñi CEO
- Products: Financial services
- Website: http://www.can.es/

Caja de Ahorros de Navarra or Caja Navarra or CAN was a medium-sized savings bank based in the Navarre province of northern Spain with headquarters in Pamplona. The financial institution broke up in 2012 among allegations of irregularities and failure by the relevant control organ of the Government of Navarre to audit the savings bank for several years. On a yearly basis, UPN's regional Government was handed over a copy-paste, two-page long activity report by Caja Navarra, as revealed in 2014.

== History ==
The bank resulted from the merger of the Caja de Ahorros y Monte de Piedad Municipal de Pamplona (founded by the Pamplona city council in 1872) and the Caja de Ahorros de Navarra (founded by the Provincial Government of Navarre in 1921) on January 17, 2000. In August 1924, the Federation of Basque-Navarrese Savings Banks was established with a view to mutually assisting and progressing together in the face of growing competition from the rising Basque banks. The Savings Banks of Pamplona joined almost immediately in 1925.

On accession of Miguel Sanz to regional office in Navarre (1996), the merger of both traditional savings banks took place to form Caja Navarra. In short time it became one of the three banks that merged to become Banca Civica.

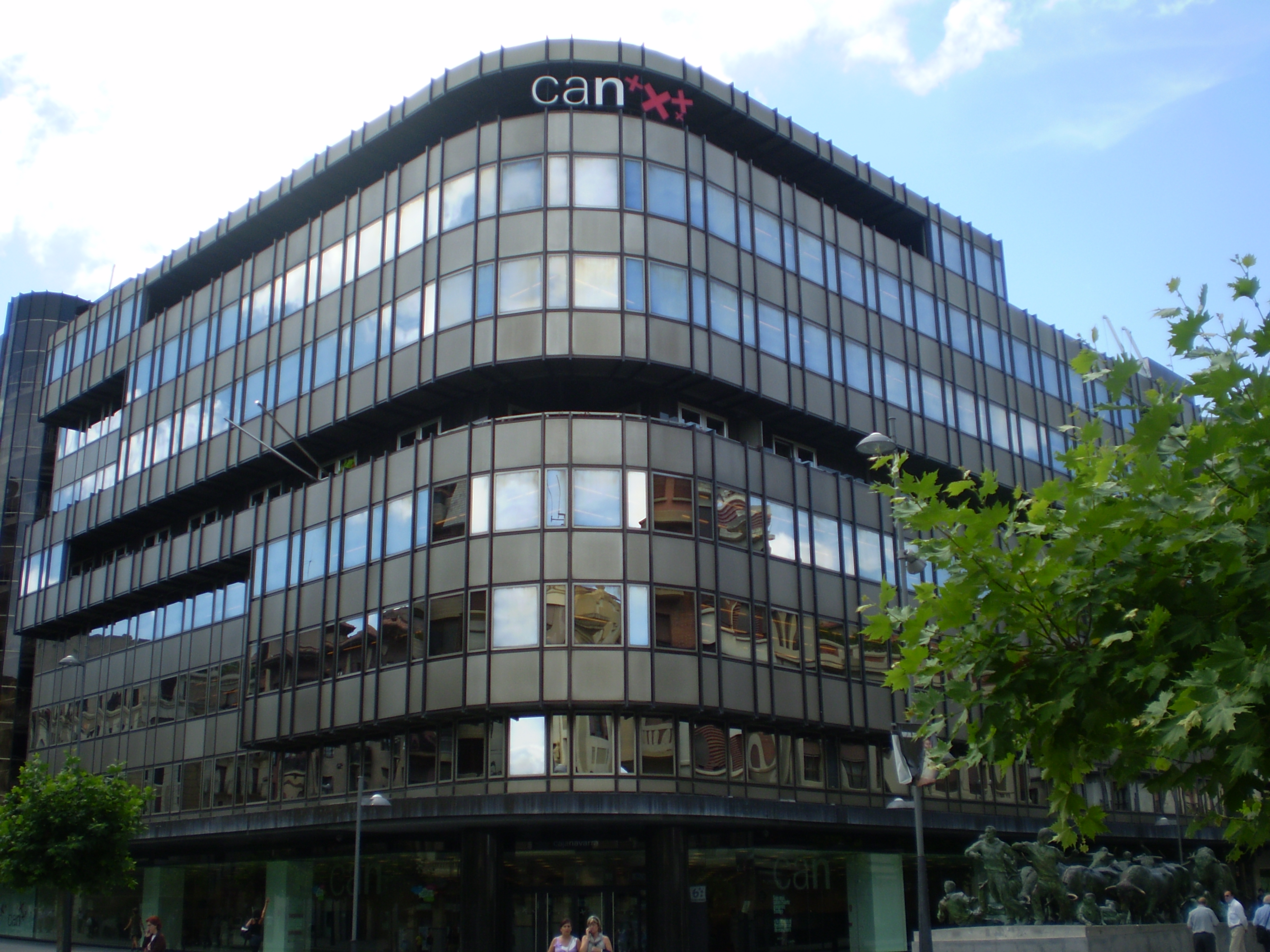
Caja Navarra

The merger came after proposals to form a powerful financial holding within the Basque context put forward by like savings banks in the Basque Autonomous Community failed to materialize. Political objections raised by the Navarrese party in office UPN prevented any moves in that direction.

== Banking context ==
In Spain, savings banks or cajas are private financial institutions organized as foundations. When they were created, their identifying features were their concern for saving, focus on the poorer classes, concentration in a geographical area, and allocation of a significant part of their profits to community and charity projects.

Under the 26/2013 Act passed by the Spanish Conservative Government that year, all savings banks were required to change their legal status, most of the times into a bank foundation. On its last stage prior to its 2012 disappearance, Caja Navarra developed under Enrique Goñi as CEO.

== The Caja Navarra scandal ==
A series of decisions made during several years led to the crash of the Caja Navarra as a savings bank, and its conversion into a foundation. In the Navarre political arena, mismanagement and obscurantism accusations emerged early on, even before the eventual fall of the financial institution. A parliamentary investigation panel was established in January 2015 to determine possible responsibilities.

== Sponsorship ==
Between 1995 and 2006, Caja Navarra was the main kit sponsor of Spanish football club CA Osasuna.

== See also ==
- List of banks in Spain
