= CaixaBank =

Spanish financial services company

CaixaBank, S.A.

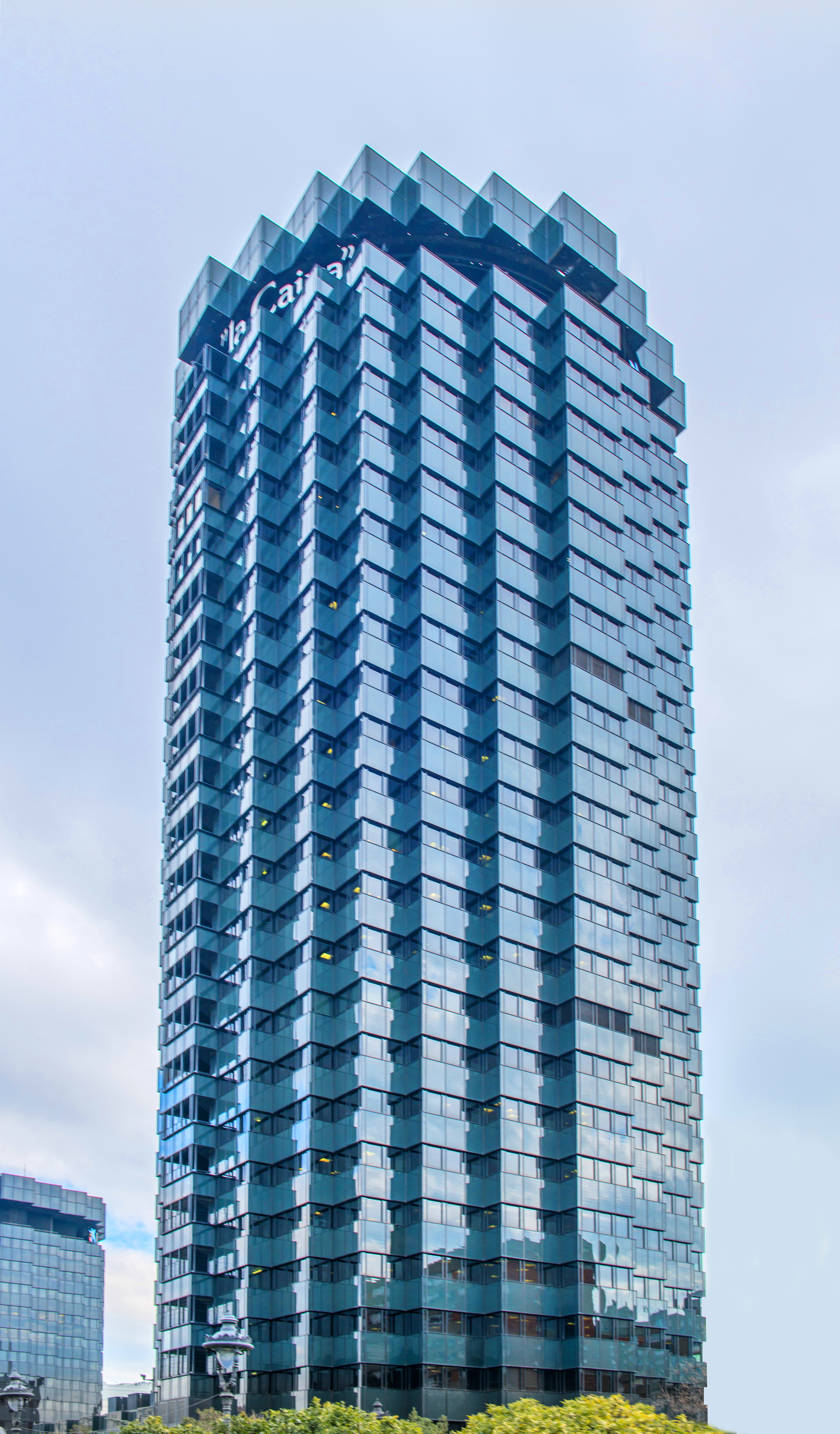
- Headquarters in Barcelona
- Type: Sociedad Anónima
- Traded as: BMAD: CABK; IBEX 35 component
- ISIN: ES0140609019
- Industry: Financial services
- Founded: January 2011; 15 years ago in Barcelona, Spain
- Headquarters: Valencia, Spain (registered office); Barcelona, Spain (operations office); Madrid, Spain (operations office)
- Key people: Tomás Muniesa (Chairman), Gonzalo Gortazar (CEO)
- Products: Universal banking, insurance, investment holdings CaixaBank, Informe Financiero Anual 2018
- Net income: 2,781 (January – March 2024)
- Total assets: €693,429 billion (Q2 2026)
- Owner: Criteria Caixa (31%); Spanish government (18%); Free floating (50.7%)
- Number of employees: 45,005 (January – March 2024)
- Website: www.caixabank.com

CaixaBank, S.A. (Catalan pronunciation: [ˌkaʃəˈbaŋ]), formerly Criteria CaixaCorp, is a Spanish multinational financial services company. CaixaBank is based in Valencia, with operations offices in Barcelona and Madrid. It is Spain's third-largest lender by market value, after Banco Santander and BBVA. CaixaBank has 5,397 branches to serve its 15.8 million customers, and has the most extensive branch network in the Spanish market. It is listed in the Bolsa de Madrid and is part of the IBEX 35.

The company consists of the universal banking and insurance activities of the La Caixa group, as well as its holdings in the telecommunications company Telefónica and in several other financial institutions.

CaixaBank has been designated as a 'Significant Institution' since European Banking Supervision entered into force in late 2014 and, as a consequence, is directly supervised by the European Central Bank.

== History ==
The firm was formed in 2007 as Criteria CaixaCorp, a publicly traded vehicle for La Caixa's shareholdings and investments in both industrial and financial services companies. At the time of its 2007 debut, the Criteria CaixaCorp initial public offering was the largest-ever in Spain. The company was promoted to the IBEX 35 index in January 2008.

A 2011 restructuring of the companies of the group saw Criteria renamed CaixaBank as La Caixa's banking and insurance activities were merged into it. At the same time most of the industrial stakes held by Criteria (including Grupo Port Aventura, Grupo Agbar, Gas Natural, and Abertis) were transferred out of the firm to the new entity Criteria CaixaHolding, 100% owned by La Caixa. CaixaBank retained stakes in Repsol YPF and Telefónica as well as all of its holdings in other financial services companies.

On 26 March 2012 CaixaBank announced its intention to merge with Banca Cívica, valuing Civica at €977 million. The merger was completed in the 3rd quarter of the year and created the largest bank in Spain.

On 27 November 2012, CaixaBank announced its plan to buy the nationalized bank Banco de Valencia after Spain's bank restructuring fund FROB injected €4.5 billion into Banco de Valencia. The FROB also assumed losses of up to 72.5% for a period of ten years in certain assets held by Banco de Valencia.

On 26 September 2013, CaixaBank approved the sale of its real estate unit Servihabitat to a joint venture between the bank and private equity fund Texas Pacific Group (TPG) for an initial price of €310 million. CaixaBank's parent company, financial group La Caixa, said it estimated it would bring in €317 million in capital gains from the deal.

In June 2014 CaixaBank's Board of Directors appointed Gonzalo Gortázar as their new CEO, having approved the resignation by mutual consent of Juan María Nin as Deputy Chairman and CEO. In his first interview since becoming CEO, Gonzalo Gortázar stated "There are a number of priorities for CaixaBank. The first one is dealing with the last legs of the crisis. We want to normalize the balance sheet and we want to normalize funding costs."

On 6 October 2017, the bank announced its decision to move its legal headquarters to Valencia as a response to political uncertainty in Catalonia. A few days later the bank decided to also move its fiscal domicile to Valencia.

On 4 September 2020, it was confirmed that CaixaBank and Bankia were negotiating a potential merger. The merger would create the biggest domestic bank in Spain with assets under management of €650 billion. The acquisition of Bankia by CaixaBank was finalised in spring 2021 and created the third-largest Spanish banking group.

=== 2008–2013 Spanish financial crisis ===
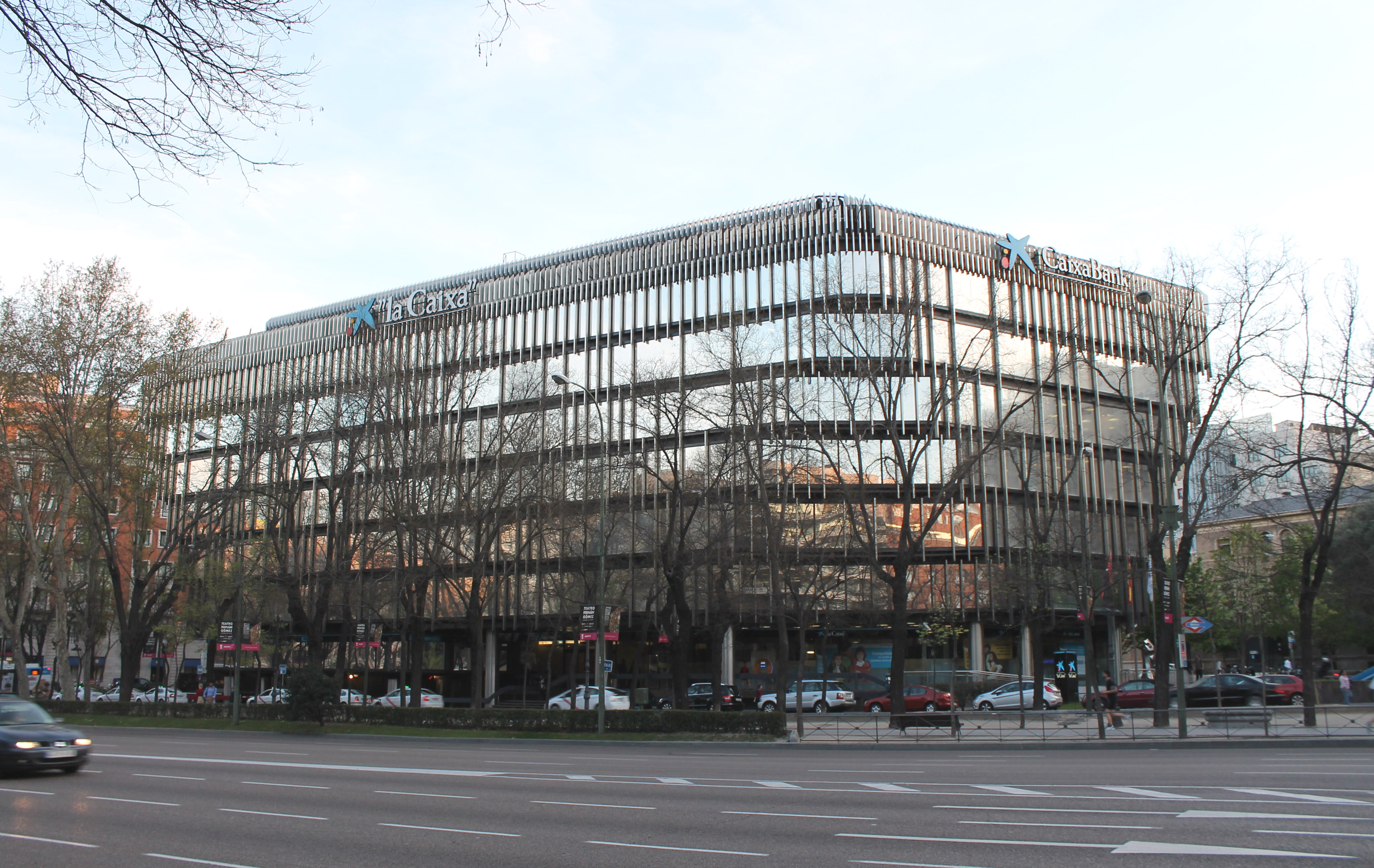
Former Madrid headquarters on Paseo de la Castellana

The Fund for Orderly Bank Restructuring (FROB), a banking bailout and reconstruction program initiated by the Spanish government in June 2009, facilitated the merger between CaixaBank and Banco de Valencia on 27 November 2012.

With competitors such as Banco Santander SA with 4,752 Spanish branches, CaixaBank announced it was conducting a "gradual process" of adjusting its branch networks on 9 January 2013.

CaixaBank SA sold 13.1 billion pesos of shares in Grupo Financiero Inbursa SAB to both bolster trading in the Mexican lender controlled by billionaire Carlos Slim and replenish money lost amid Spain's property crash.

== Shareholders ==
Following the merger of state-owned Bankia and private CaixaBank, Criteria Caixa (and, therefore, the "la Caixa" Foundation) held 30.012% of the bank. The Government of Spain, through the FROB and its company BFA Tenedora de Acciones, became a major shareholder of the company with 16.117%.

As of September 2026, the shareholding structure of the bank is as follows:

- Criteria Caixa: 31%
- FROB: 18%
- Public float: 50.7%
- Treasury share + Board of Directors: 0.3%

== Investment portfolio (at 27 July 2019) ==
Company	% of share capital
Banco BPI	100%
SegurCaixa Adeslas	49.92%
Comercia Global Payments	49%
Coral Homes	20%
Sareb	12,24%
Erste Group	9.92%
Telefónica	5.019%

== See also ==
- Caja de Guadalajara
- List of banks in the euro area
- List of banks in Spain
