= Caja Castilla-La Mancha =

Spanish Bank

Castilla-La Mancha Savings Bank
- Caja Castilla-La Mancha
- Nickname: CCM
- Formation: 1992
- Dissolved: 2010
- Location(s): Cuenca, Spain
- Services: Savings Bank

Caja Castilla-La Mancha (Spanish for: Castilla-La Mancha Savings Bank) also known as Caja de Ahorros de Castilla-La Mancha or CCM was a Spanish savings bank headquartered in Cuenca.

In 2010, Cajastur took over the financial business of Caja Castilla-La Mancha (CCM) through its subsidiary Banco Liberta, which changed its name to Banco Castilla-La Mancha. After the transfer of Cajastur's financial business to Liberbank, Banco Castilla-La Mancha became a subsidiary of Liberbank. The transformation of the bank's Obra Social gave rise to the Fundación Caja Castilla La Mancha.

== History ==
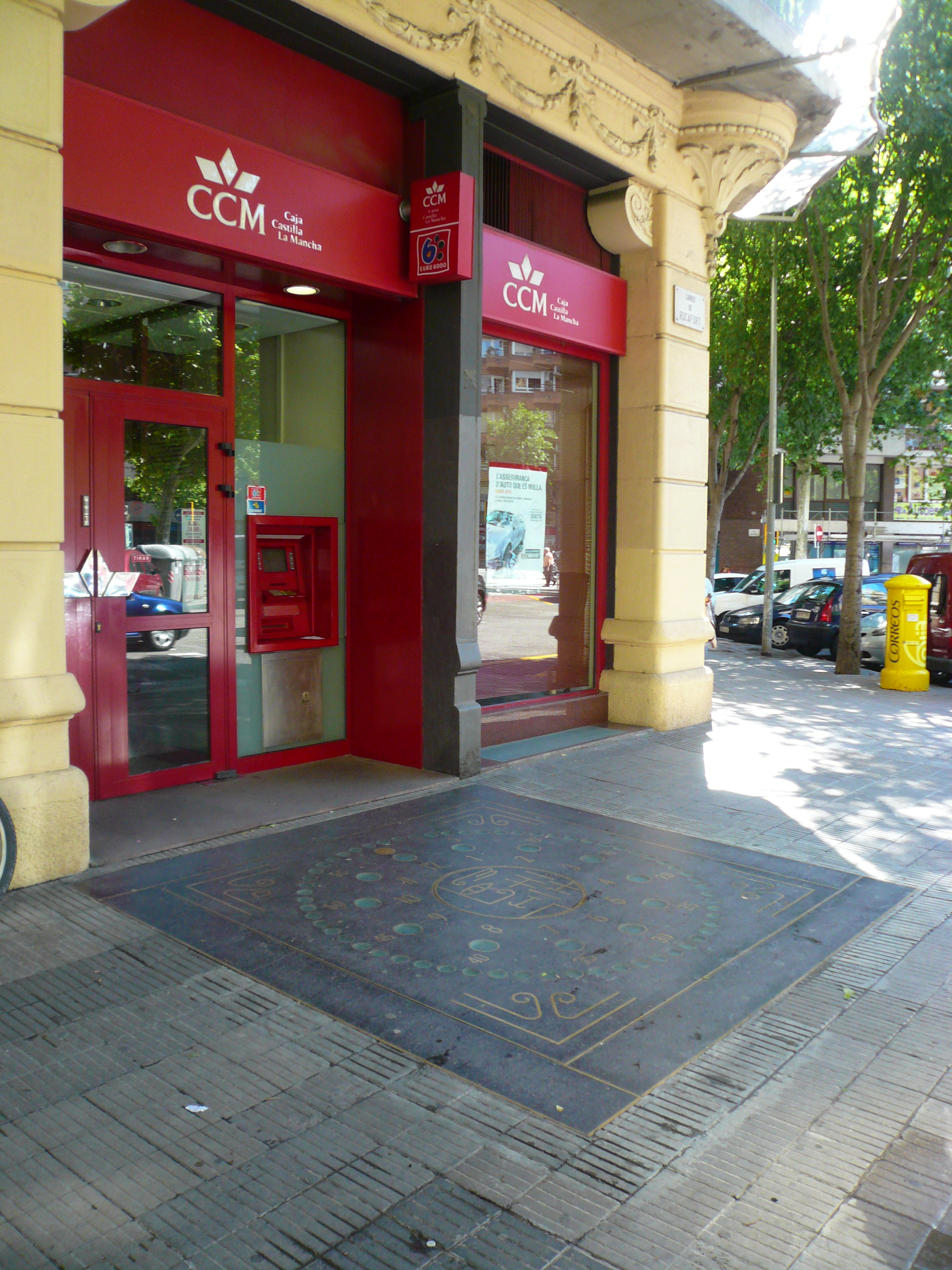
Caja Castilla-La Mancha office in Barcelona

It was created as the result of the merger of three provincial savings banks: Caja de Ahorros Provincial de Albacete, Caja de Ahorros de Cuenca y Ciudad Real and Caja de Ahorros Provincial de Toledo on June 26, 1992. After the merger, only two savings banks were left with headquarters in the community: Caja Castilla-La Mancha itself and Caja de Guadalajara. In 1999, the possible merger of both entities was discussed, but no agreement was reached.

From 1999 until its intervention by the Bank of Spain in March 2009, its president was Juan Pedro Hernández Moltó. On July 1, 2010, the General Meeting of the Savings Bank announced the disappearance of CCM as a Savings Bank and its conversion into a foundation.

Its network of 582 branches was mainly spread throughout all the provinces of Castilla-La Mancha, with a smaller presence in Guadalajara, which had its own savings bank. It was also present in other Spanish provinces.

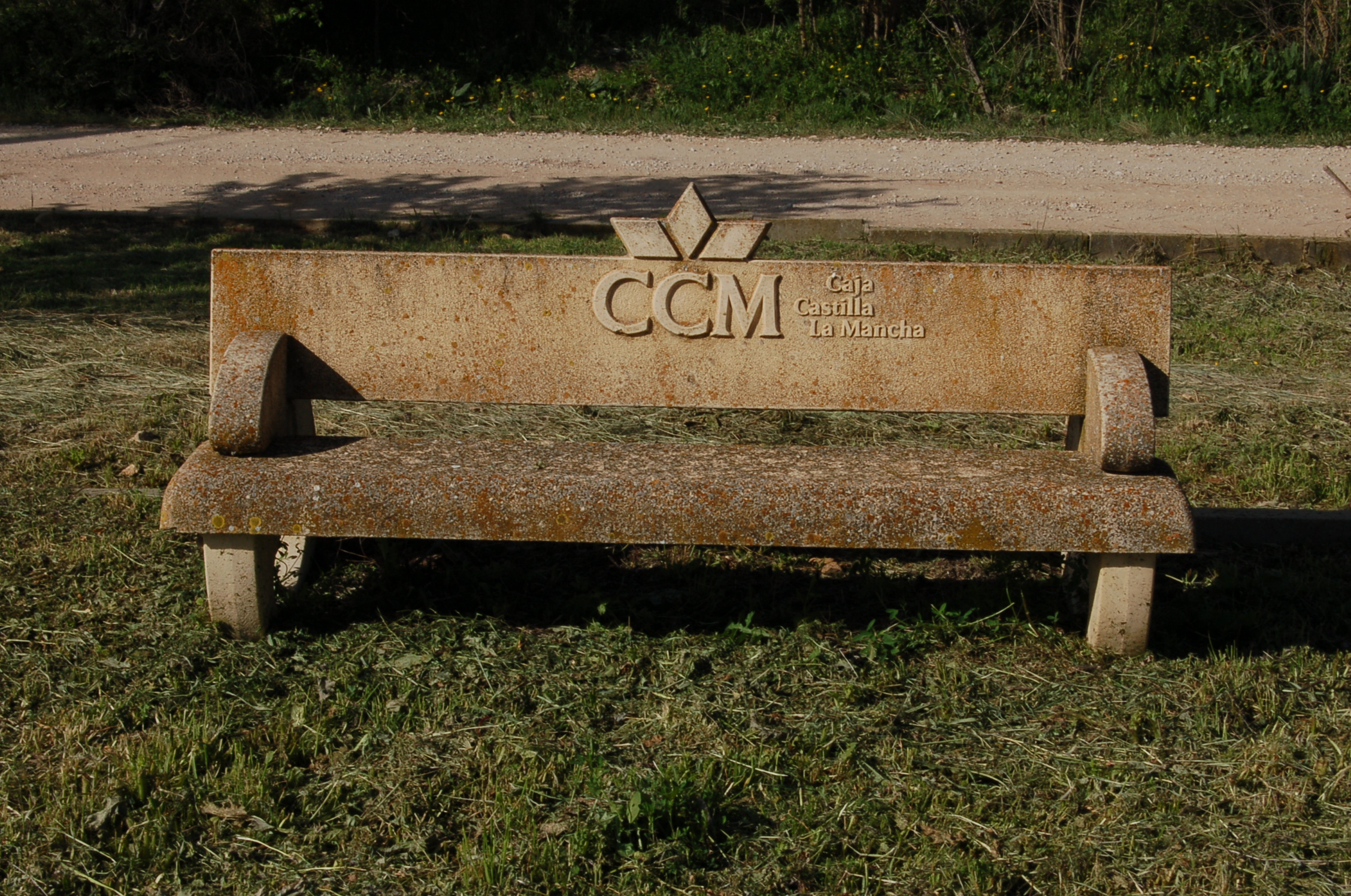
MCC Bank in Hontecillas.

=== Bank of Spain intervention ===
At the end of 2008, when the first signs of crisis appeared in Caja Castilla-La Mancha, an attempt was made to merge it with Ibercaja and after the failure of this merger, negotiations began for a possible merger with Unicaja.

On Saturday, March 28, 2009, the Bank of Spain took the decision to intervene in the institution, dismissing its entire board of directors headed by Juan Pedro Hernández Moltó, appointed three administrators, guaranteed the Caja's deposits with the Deposit Guarantee Fund and immediately notified the Ministry of Economy. On Sunday, March 29, an extraordinary Council of Ministers met to approve a decree and law endorsing the necessary liquidity injection. The lack of liquidity was a consequence, in large part caused by its investments in the construction sector and the deep Spanish real estate crisis that had been unfolding since 2008.

On April 16, 2009, Gorka Barrondo Agudín, who had been deputy general manager of Finance and Asset Management at the company since July 2007, was appointed general manager, replacing Ildefonso Ortega Rodríguez-Arias, who had been dismissed.

On May 4, 2009, Xabier Alkorta Andonegi, former general manager of Kutxa and at the request of the Administrators of the Bank of Spain, was appointed as general manager of the Caja Castilla-La Mancha Group.

On October 30, 2009, the deadline for the entities that opted to merge with the Castilian-La Mancha entity to submit their proposals to the Bank of Spain ended, although it was finally extended to allow more bids to be submitted.

On November 3, 2009, the Bank of Spain authorized the "partial integration" into Cajastur of Caja Castilla-La Mancha (CCM), which had been placed under supervision by the supervisor since March. The merger of the two entities was not carried out through a merger. Cajastur sought an alternative solution to take over CCM's banking business indirectly. Banco Liberta, an inactive entity of the Asturian savings bank that had a banking record, absorbed the banking assets and liabilities of CCM. This entity would have its headquarters in Castilla-La Mancha and would be a subsidiary of Cajastur, which would hold 75% of the capital of this entity. In exchange, the Asturian entity would hand over 25% of Liberta to a Foundation, which had to be created in Castilla-La Mancha. The new bank would maintain the commercial name of CCM in its branches.

In total, three types of aid were granted to Caja Castilla-La Mancha (CCM): an emergency injection to keep the institution alive after the intervention of which 1150 million were used (the Government made available up to 9000 million); 1300 million euros in preferred shares granted by the Deposit Guarantee Fund (FGD) (the FROB did not exist yet); and 2475 million of Asset Protection Scheme (EPA) on the value of the assets for the winner of the bid, in that case Cajastur (to which must be added another 350 million in bridge financing). In total, 5275 million euros.

On September 21, 2010, Cajastur took definitive control of the financial business of Caja Castilla-La Mancha (CCM) with the notarization and presentation to the Mercantile Registry of the agreements and contracts for the segregation of assets of the La Mancha entity and the incorporation of all its financial business (branches, brand, customers, deposits, loans and other financial products) to Banco Liberta, a subsidiary of Cajastur. This entity, which months before had moved its headquarters from Oviedo to Cuenca, on the same day elevated this change of address to public rank and also the substitution of its corporate name, so that "Banco Liberta, S.A." became "Banco Castilla-La Mancha, S.A." for all purposes.

On September 30, 2010, the new entity. born from the previous operation, began operating under the name of Banco Castilla-La Mancha, although maintaining the commercial brand CCM.

=== Disappearance: transformation into a foundation ===
On September 30, 2010, the transformation of the bank's Obra Social gave rise to the Fundación Caja Castilla La Mancha. This foundation is the one that took on the task of contributing to the social, welfare, cultural, educational and environmental development of Castilla-La Mancha that this social work had. It received 25% of Banco Castilla-La Mancha's capital.

On September 25, 2014, the Foundation's Board of Trustees approved the transformation into a banking foundation, thus adapting to the Law on Savings Banks and Banking Foundations.

In August 2015, Citizens denounced that the Expediente de Regulación Temporal de Empleo (ERTE) of the Caja Castilla-La Mancha Foundation had become an expired Expediente de Regulación.

On June 15, 2016, the entity was transformed into a banking foundation.

On December 18, 2017, the General Shareholders' Meeting of Banco Castilla-La Mancha (of which the foundation held 25% of the capital) agreed to a simultaneous capital reduction and capital increase to restore the entity's equity balance. Liberbank undertook to subscribe 100% of the capital increase, becoming the sole shareholder of Banco Castilla-La Mancha. On January 31, 2018, this transaction was registered in the Commercial Registry of Cuenca.

Finally, after the Expediente de Regulación de Empleo (ERE) "for economic reasons" through which the foundation had got rid of its entire staff, the foundation ceased its activities.

== Court cases ==
Concerning the 2009 intervention by the Bank of Spain, on October 15, 2013, the judge of the National Court, Pablo Ruz, indicted seven executives of Caja Castilla-La Mancha for their mismanagement of the institution, which could have resulted in a financial loss during their management. On December 16, 2014, Pablo Ruz opened trial against the former managers of Caja Castilla-La Mancha and imposed 138 million bail on them. The judge charged Juan Pedro Hernández Moltó and Ildefonso Ortega with disloyal administration and falsification of accounts.

In February 2016, the Audiencia Nacional sentenced Juan Pedro Hernández Moltó, former president of the entity and former PSOE deputy, and Ildefonso Ortega, former general manager, to two years in prison for a corporate crime of false accounting committed by manipulating the entity's accounts. They were also sentenced to two years' disqualification from holding office in the financial sector and a fine of 29,970 euros, as well as payment of costs. The judge stated that he did not increase the sentence any further because there was no personal enrichment. The court acquitted them of the crime of fraudulent administration and will have to decide whether or not to imprison them.

== See also ==
- 2008–2014 Spanish real estate crisis
- List of banks in Spain
