= Unicaja =

Spanish savings bank

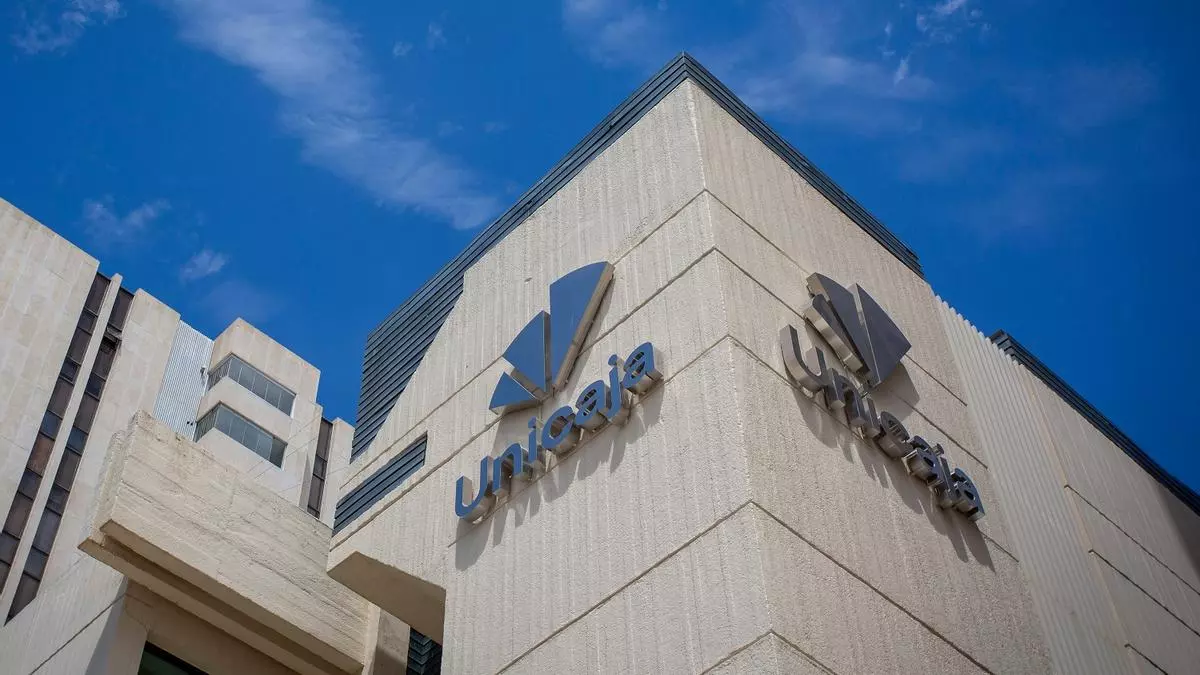
- Unicaja's headquarters in Málaga.
- Formerly: Unicaja Banco, S.A.
- Type: S.A. (corporation)
- Traded as: BMAD: UNI IBEX 35: UNI
- ISIN: ES0180907000
- Industry: Finance and insurance
- Genre: S.A. (corporation)
- Founded: 18 March 1991
- Headquarters: Avda. de Andalucía, 10-12, 29007 Málaga, Spain
- Key people: José Sevilla Álvarez (Chairman); Isidro Rubiales Gil (CEO)
- Products: Financial services
- Revenue: ▲€632 million (2025)
- Total assets: €99,087 billion (Q1 2026)▲
- Number of employees: 7,281 (2025)
- Website: www.unicajabanco.es

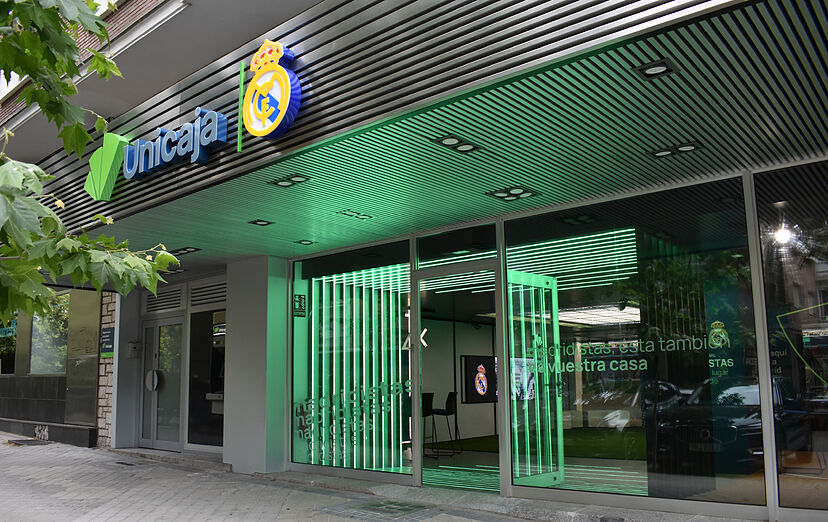
Unicaja branch in Madrid as an official sponsor of Real Madrid C.F.

Unicaja Banco, S.A. (trade name: Unicaja) is a Spanish bank based in Málaga. It was created by the savings bank (Monte de Piedad y Caja de Ahorros de Ronda, Cádiz, Almería, Málaga, Antequera y Jaén) Unicaja in 2011, to indirectly carry out its financial activity.

As of December 31, 2025, Unicaja's assets stood at €98,428 million, making it the sixth-largest Spanish financial institution by asset volume. As of that same date it had 945 branches and 7,281 employees.

It is listed on the Madrid Stock Exchange (UNI) and is a constituent of the IBEX 35 index.

== History ==
=== Birth of Unicaja ===
On December 1, 2011, the savings bank Monte de Piedad y Caja de Ahorros de Ronda, Cádiz, Almería, Málaga, Antequera y Jaén (Unicaja) signed the incorporation deed of its bank, 100% owned by the entity, for the indirect exercise of its financial activity, whereby the entity spun off its financial business into the aforementioned bank Unicaja Banco, S.A.U. (later, Unicaja Banco, S.A.), meaning the savings bank itself did not disappear and continued to maintain its social welfare programs and pawnshop (monte de piedad).

=== Integration of EspañaDuero ===
The General Assembly of Caja España-Duero approved the merger with Unicaja on September 26, 2011.

By December 2012, the merger process was more than a year behind schedule. The only option Banco CEISS had to avoid nationalization was through the merger with Unicaja Banco. Given this new situation, the Málaga-based entity intended to secure at least 90% of the future entity, whereas the initial agreement, reached in the summer of 2011, granted Unicaja a 70% stake against 30% for Caja España-Duero.

On May 10, 2013, the governing committee of the FROB and the executive committee of the Bank of Spain gave the green light to the merger between Unicaja Banco and CEISS, maintaining the amount of public financial support of €604 million that CEISS had received in the form of contingent convertible bonds ("cocos").

On July 15, 2013, Unicaja Banco approved beginning the process to launch a takeover bid directed at shareholders and holders of mandatorily and contingently convertible bonds of Banco CEISS.

On October 11, 2013, Unicaja Banco's general shareholders' meeting approved the offer that the board of directors had made a week earlier for Banco CEISS. On October 15, 2013, CEISS's Board of Directors viewed favorably the takeover offer put forward by Unicaja Banco, as it guaranteed the continuity of CEISS as a regional bank.

On November 27, 2013, the acceptance period opened for former holders of preferred shares and subordinated debt of Caja España and Caja Duero, bondholders of CEISS, to accept Unicaja Banco's takeover offer. The offer was conditional on acceptance by a minimum of 75% of Banco CEISS shares and a minimum of 75% of the combined total of shares and mandatorily and contingently convertible bonds of CEISS. However, Unicaja Banco retained the option to waive this latter condition.

On January 20, 2014, the offer expired. The minimum acceptance condition for shares was met, with 99.39% of Banco CEISS's share capital tendered, but the condition covering the combined securities was not met, reaching only 61.30% of the combined total of shares and mandatorily and contingently convertible bonds of CEISS. As a result, the FROB amended CEISS's resolution plan. The fund would assume 71% of the impact of the claim from holders of mandatorily and contingently convertible bonds of CEISS who did not accept the offer, up to a maximum of €319 million (€241 million net of the compensation the FROB might receive under the Compensation Mechanism), while CEISS would bear the remaining 29%. Unicaja Banco committed to waiving the second condition once all necessary authorizations were obtained, including final approval by CEISS, the FROB, the Bank of Spain, and Sareb, as well as authorization from EU authorities.

On March 21, 2014, Unicaja Banco officially announced it would absorb CEISS and convert it into a subsidiary.

On March 28, 2014, Unicaja Banco completed its acquisition, turning Banco CEISS into a subsidiary. Shareholders and bondholders of CEISS who accepted the offer would receive Unicaja Banco shares and bonds as consideration no later than April 2. After the exchange of tendered securities, Unicaja Banco became the main shareholder of Banco CEISS with 99.16% of its share capital.

Following the acquisition of CEISS by Unicaja Banco, CEISS's former shareholders (mainly CaixaBank, Euroclear Bank, Banco Mare Nostrum (BMN), JP Morgan Securities, Caja3, and Banco Sabadell, among others) entered the Málaga-based entity's capital, coming to control nearly 10% of it after exchanging their CEISS shares. For instance, CaixaBank came to control around 1.6% of Unicaja Banco; Banco Mare Nostrum (BMN), 0.96%; and Banco Sabadell around 0.5%. In addition, before 2016, Unicaja Banco had to exchange for shares the bonds received by savers from Castile and León. The entity was expected to go public that year to give former owners of CEISS the opportunity to sell their holdings.

Specifically, Unicaja reduced its ownership stake in Unicaja Banco's capital from 100% to 90.8%, with 9.2% remaining in the hands of institutional investors.

On June 25, 2014, Banco CEISS's Board of Directors agreed to the mandatory full conversion of the Mandatorily and Contingently Convertible Bonds into shares. Following this conversion, Unicaja Banco became the holder of 60.66% of Banco CEISS's share capital.

In January 2015, the boards of directors of Unicaja Banco and Banco CEISS approved Unicaja Banco's acquisition of 30 branches from its subsidiary Banco CEISS.

On June 29, 2016, Braulio Medel submitted his resignation as chairman of the financial entity to the Board of Directors. On June 30, he was replaced by Manuel Azuaga, until then vice-chairman and CEO of the bank. This was due to the savings bank law, which "requires a choice" to be made when a single person simultaneously holds positions at both the banking entity and the foundation. Braulio Medel decided to remain at the head of the banking foundation.

That same day, June 30, the mandatorily and contingently convertible bonds ("cocos") held by individual bondholders of EspañaDuero (the new name of Banco CEISS) were exchanged. These individuals became shareholders of Unicaja Banco. It was estimated that the exchange of these cocos, with a combined value of €49 million, could give individual bondholders a stake of around 4.5%.

On June 30, 2017, Unicaja Banco went public at a price of €1.10 per share, allowing it to raise around €660 million. The entity placed 625 million newly issued shares on the market, among large institutional investors. In addition, it granted the underwriting banks the option to subscribe an additional 62.5 million shares through a "greenshoe" or over-allotment option. The funds raised would be used to repay the €604 million in public aid injected by the State into EspañaDuero, acquired by Unicaja Banco, and to buy from the FROB, for €62 million, the stake it still held in that entity. After the IPO, the Fundación Bancaria Unicaja, Unicaja Banco's majority shareholder, saw its stake diluted to 51.7%, not accounting for the over-allotment option.

On August 31, 2017, Unicaja Banco early repaid the Fondo de Reestructuración Ordenada Bancaria (FROB) the entire €604 million in public aid received in the form of capital, as contingent convertible obligations ("cocos"), by EspañaDuero in 2013, after obtaining the necessary administrative authorizations and adopting the corresponding corporate resolutions. The deadline had been April 2018.

On December 20, 2017, Unicaja Banco purchased the 12.5% stake in EspañaDuero temporarily held by the Fondo de Reestructuración Ordenada Bancaria (FROB) for €36.7 million.

On January 26, 2018, the boards of directors of Unicaja Banco and EspañaDuero approved the joint plan for the merger by absorption of EspañaDuero into Unicaja Banco. It was estimated that EspañaDuero's minority shareholders affected by the merger would represent less than 3% of its capital at the date of the exchange, while the rest of the capital corresponded to shares owned by Unicaja Banco or held in treasury. As a result of this merger, EspañaDuero's minority shareholders would receive one Unicaja Banco share (with a nominal value of one euro) for every five EspañaDuero shares (with a nominal value of €0.25). Consequently, once the operation was completed, this group would come to hold 0.4% of Unicaja Banco's share capital.

On September 21, 2018, the deed for the merger by absorption of EspañaDuero into Unicaja Banco was registered with the Commercial Registry, after the document — marking the completion of the process following the required authorizations, in accordance with the merger plan of both entities' Boards of Directors and approved by their respective General Shareholders' Meetings in April — was signed on September 7. Once the merger was finalized, the exchange of EspañaDuero shares held by minority shareholders for Unicaja Banco shares would take place, paving the way for the integration of EspañaDuero's technological and IT platform into that of Unicaja Banco.

In December 2018, the rebranding of EspañaDuero's branches in Castile and León began, with the name "Unicaja Banco" prevailing while "EspañaDuero" would remain as a secondary brand. At the former EspañaDuero branches located in the rest of Spain, the brand was replaced with "Unicaja Banco".

=== Integration of Liberbank ===
On December 12, 2018, Unicaja Banco and Liberbank acknowledged their intention to merge. However, on May 14, 2019, they abandoned their plans after Liberbank decided not to accept the exchange ratio proposed by Unicaja Banco, which would have given it 40% of the new group.

On October 7, 2020, Unicaja Banco and Liberbank convened their respective boards of directors to approve the start of merger negotiations.

On December 29, 2020, the boards of directors of Unicaja Banco and Liberbank approved the merger by absorption of the latter into Unicaja Banco, with an exchange ratio of one new ordinary Unicaja Banco share for every 2.7705 Liberbank shares. Unicaja Banco's shareholders would hold 59.5% of the resulting merged group, while the remaining 40.5% would go to Liberbank's shareholders (among them, the Fundación Cajastur, Fundación Caja de Extremadura, and Fundación Caja Cantabria). This deal would create the fifth-largest bank in Spain, with assets of close to €110,000 million. Unicaja Banco's chairman, Manuel Azuaga, would hold the same position at the resulting entity, while Liberbank's CEO, Manuel Menéndez, would hold that same post at the group at least until 2023. Following the merger with Liberbank, Unicaja Banco's registered office and main operational hub would remain in Málaga, but it would also have operational centers in that Andalusian city, in Oviedo — key to Liberbank — and in Madrid.

On March 31, 2021, the shareholders' meetings of both banks approved the deal. On July 6, 2021, it was announced that Unicaja Banco would implement its brand across Liberbank's branch network. On July 16, 2021, the Government approved the merger, after the Comisión Nacional de los Mercados y la Competencia (CNMC) had also done so. On July 30, 2021, the merger deed was registered with the Commercial Registry of Málaga, giving rise to an entity with nearly €113,000 million in assets, 1,400 branches, 9,700 employees and more than 4.5 million customers. On August 2, shares of the "new" bank would begin trading and Liberbank's shares would cease trading, following a capital increase to cover the planned share exchange.

On May 23, 2022, Unicaja Banco completed the technological and operational integration of Liberbank.

In November 2023, it was expected that the unification of both brands would be completed in the following months. In November 2023, Manuel Azuaga, chairman of Unicaja Banco, resigned from his position after expressing disagreements over the merger process with Liberbank.

=== New stage ===
On February 8, 2024, it was announced that the bank was unveiling a new brand, moving from "Unicaja Banco" back to simply "Unicaja", as the former savings bank had been known, but with a more modern image.

On July 30, 2024, it was announced that the Andorran bank MoraBanc had reached an agreement to purchase 100% of the capital of Banco Europeo de Finanzas (BEF) from Unicaja. The purchase, for an amount of €45 million, was completed on July 28, 2025.

The name "Unicaja" remains a commercial brand of Unicaja Banco, in which the foundation holds a stake of 30.24% as of 31 December 2023.

== Sponsorships ==
The company sponsors several major sports clubs in its region. It is the owner of the basketball club Baloncesto Málaga, the sponsor of the volleyball club CV Almería, and is also a major sponsor, though not name sponsor, of Málaga CF.

== Shareholders ==
As of December 31, 2025, its main shareholder was the Fundación Unicaja, which held 31.22% of Unicaja Banco.

Other significant shareholders were the following:

- Spain Seguros Santa Lucía (9.56%)
- Spain Tomás Olivo López (9.39%)
- Spain Indumenta Pueri, S.L. (8.85%)
- Spain Fundación Cajastur (6.89%)

== Branch network ==
As of December 31, 2025, Unicaja Banco had 945 branches and 7,281 employees.

Since early 2024, the new corporate identity has been rolled out across branches. The "Unicaja" brand is expected to replace both the "Unicaja Banco" brand and the "Liberbank" brand.

== See also ==
- Liberbank
- List of banks in the euro area
- List of banks in Spain
