= 2008–2014 Spanish financial crisis =

Economic situation in Spain

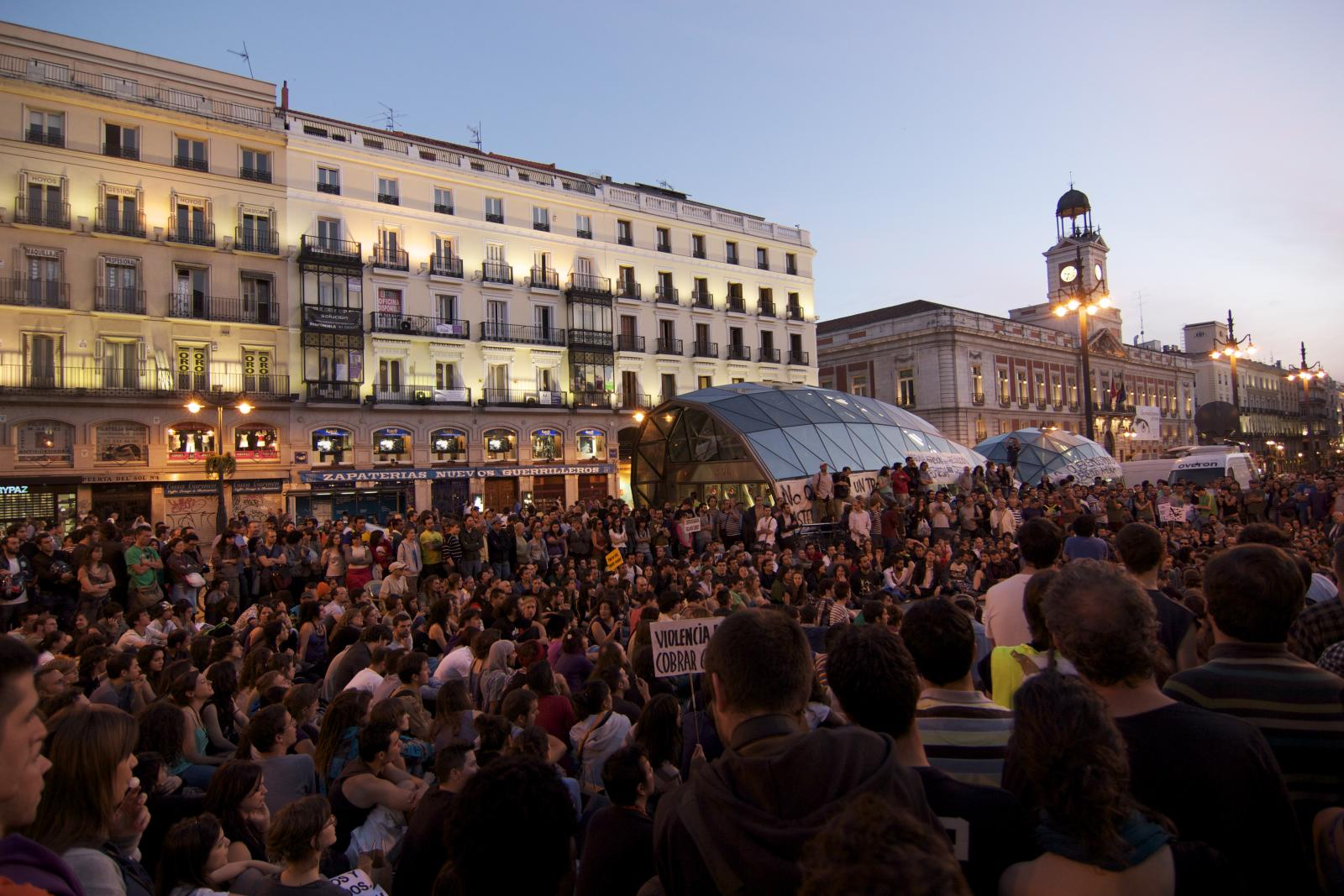
Demonstration against the crisis and high youth unemployment in Madrid, 15 May 2011

The 2008–2014 Spanish financial crisis, also known as the Great Recession in Spain or the Great Spanish Depression, began in 2008 during the 2008 financial crisis. In 2012, it made Spain a late participant in the Euro area crisis when the country was unable to bail out its financial sector and had to apply for a €100 billion rescue package provided by the European Stability Mechanism (ESM).

The main cause of Spain's crisis was the housing bubble and the accompanying unsustainably high GDP growth rate. The ballooning tax revenues from the booming property investment and construction sectors kept the Spanish government's revenue in surplus, despite strong increases in expenditure, until 2007. The Spanish government supported the critical development by relaxing supervision of the financial sector and thereby allowing the banks to violate International Accounting Standards Board standards. The banks in Spain were able to hide losses and earnings volatility, mislead regulators, analysts, and investors, and thereby finance the Spanish real estate bubble. The results of the crisis were devastating for Spain, including a strong economic downturn, a severe increase in unemployment, and bankruptcies of major companies.

Even though some fundamental problems in the Spanish economy were already evident far ahead of the crisis, Spain continued the path of unsustainable property led growth when the ruling party changed in 2004. In these times Spain had already a huge trade deficit, a loss of competitiveness against its main trading partners, an above-average inflation rate, house price increases, and a growing family indebtedness.

Following Spain's entry into the eurozone in 1999, lower interest rates and convergence with European inflation rates contributed to a rapid expansion of credit. Credit to the non-financial private sector grew at an average annual rate of about 17% between 1997 and 2007, substantially faster than nominal GDP, with particularly rapid growth in lending to construction and real-estate activities. Private-sector indebtedness consequently increased sharply during the boom, with credit flows to the private sector averaging around 18 percentage points of GDP annually between 1999 and 2007. During the third quarter of 2008 the national GDP contracted for the first time in 15 years, and, in February 2009, Spain (and other European economies) officially entered recession. The economy contracted 3.7% in 2009 and again in 2010 by 0.1%. It grew by 0.7% in 2011. By the 1st quarter of 2012, Spain was officially in recession once again. The Spanish government forecast a 1.7% drop for 2012.

The provision of up to €100 billion of rescue loans from eurozone funds was agreed by eurozone finance ministers on 9 June 2012. As of October 2012, the so-called Troika (European Commission, ECB and IMF) was in negotiations with Spain to establish an economic recovery program required for providing additional financial loans from the European Stability Mechanism (ESM). In addition to applying for a €100 billion bank recapitalization package in June 2012, Spain negotiated financial support from a "Precautionary Conditioned Credit Line" (PCCL) package. If Spain applied and received a PCCL package, irrespective to what extent it subsequently decided to draw on this established credit line, this would at the same time immediately qualify the country to receive "free" additional financial support from the European Central Bank (ECB), in the form of some unlimited yield-lowering bond purchases.

The turning point for the Spanish sovereign debt crisis occurred on 26 July 2012, when ECB President Mario Draghi said that the ECB was "ready to do whatever it takes to preserve the euro". Announced on 6 September 2012, the ECB's Outright Monetary Transactions (OMT) program of unlimited purchases of short-term sovereign debt put the ECB's balance sheet behind the pledge. Speculative runs against Spanish sovereign debt were discouraged and 10-year bond yields stayed below the 6% level, approaching the 5% level by the end of 2012.

== Property bubble ==
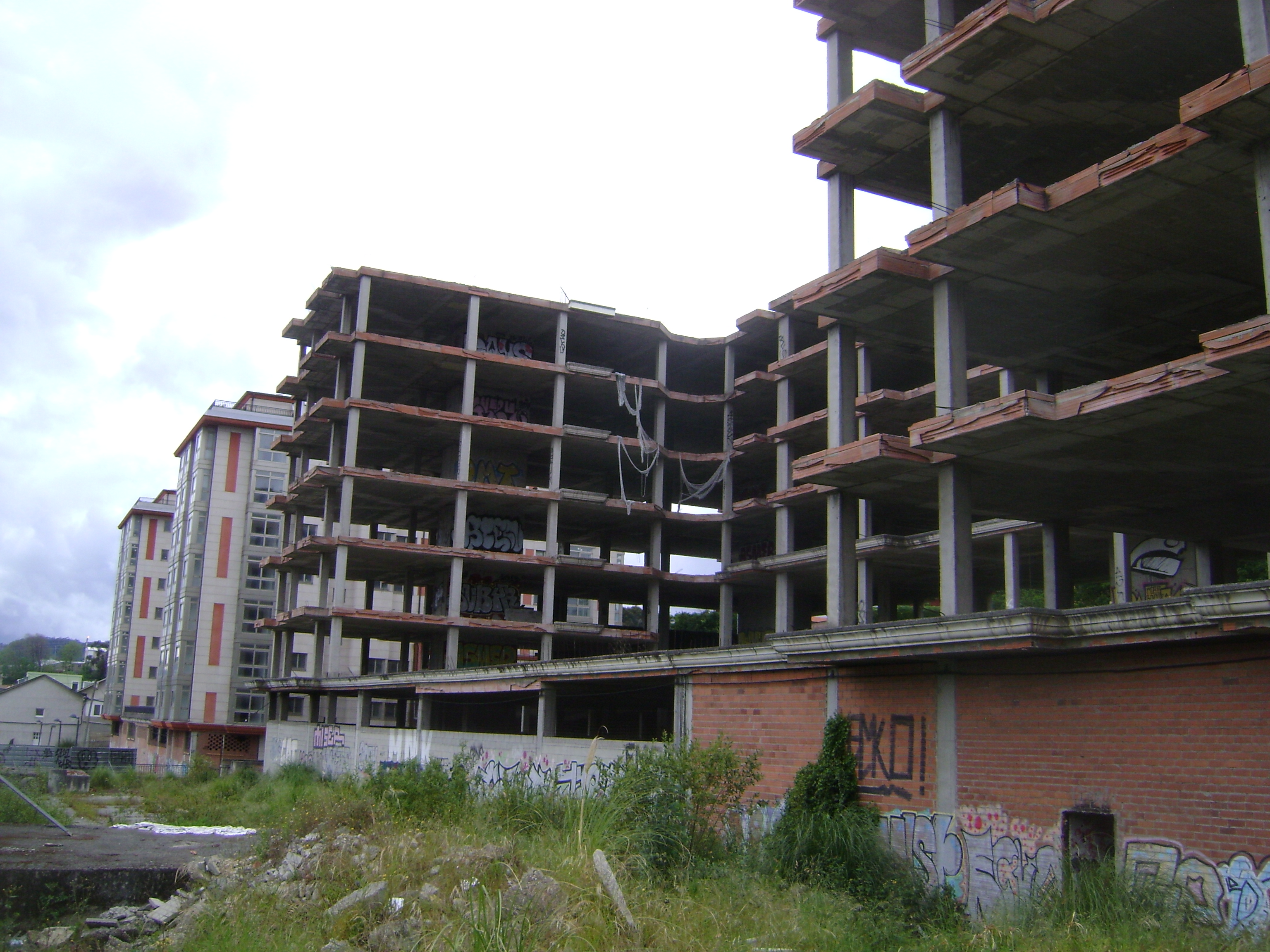
Unfinished buildings due to the crisis in A Coruña

The residential real estate bubble saw real estate prices rise 200% from 1996 to 2007.

€651 billion was the mortgage debt of Spanish families in the second quarter of 2005 (this debt continued to grow at 25% per year – 2001 through 2005, with 97% of mortgages at variable rate interest). In 2004, 509,293 new properties were built in Spain and in 2005 the number of new properties built was 528,754. In a country with 16.5 million families, there were 22–24 million houses and 3–4 million empty houses. From all the houses built over the 2001–2007 period, "no less than 28%" were vacant as of late 2008.

House ownership in Spain is above 80%. The desire to own one's own home was encouraged by governments in the 60s and 70s, and has thus become part of the Spanish psyche. In addition, tax regulation encourages ownership: 15% of mortgage payments are deductible from personal income taxes. Even more, the oldest apartments are controlled by non-inflation-adjusted rent controls and eviction is slow, therefore discouraging renting.

When the speculative bubble popped Spain became one of the worst affected countries. According to Eurostat, between June 2007 and June 2008, Spain has been the European country with the sharpest plunge in construction, with actual sales down an average 25.3%. So far, some regions have been more affected than others (Catalonia was ahead in this regard with a 42.2% sales plunge while sparsely populated regions like Extremadura were down a mere 1.7% over the same period).

Banks offered 40-year mortgages and, more recently, 50-year mortgages. While some observers suggest that a soft landing would occur, others suggest that a crash in prices is probable. Lower home prices would allow low-income families and young people to enter the market; however, there is a strong perception that house prices never go down. As of August 2008, while new constructions have come virtually to a halt, prices have not had significant movements either up or downwards. The national average price as of late 2008 is 2,095 euros/m^{2}.

Housing prices were projected to fall another 25%. Government protections allow banks to avoid marking-to-market to postpone losses. "Spanish housing prices are now falling at the fastest pace on record" dropping 15.2% over the last year. Mortgage holders must continue to pay the debt even after a foreclosure. Banks have begun to accept "deed-in-lieu deals" in which the debt is cancelled if the property is surrendered, allowing the bank to quickly sell and recoup a greater percentage of the loan or turn the property into a rental. The collapse of the property market also produced a large number of mortgage foreclosures and evictions. In March 2013, the Court of Justice of the European Union ruled that Spanish legislation was contrary to EU consumer-protection law because a court assessing whether a mortgage term was unfair could not suspend the separate mortgage-enforcement proceedings. The ruling highlighted the limited protection available to mortgage borrowers under Spanish law.

Some developments resemble ghost towns. For instance, the town of Valdeluz was constructed for 30,000 people, but had a population of only 700 people in 2011. Ghost airports such as €1.1 billion Ciudad Real Central Airport, Castellón-Costa Azahar Airport and others were built.

== Prices ==
Due to the lack of its own resources, Spain has to import all of its fossil fuels, which in a scenario of record prices added much pressure to the inflation rate. Thus, in June 2008 the inflation rate reached a 13-year high of 5.00%. Then, with the dramatic decrease of oil prices that happened in the second half of 2008 plus the confirmed burst of the property bubble, concerns quickly shifted to the risk of deflation instead, as Spain registered in January 2009 its lowest inflation rate in 40 years which was then followed in March 2009 by a negative inflation rate for the first time ever since this statistic was recorded.

As of October 2010, the Spanish economy continued to contract, resulting in decreasing GDP and increasing inflation. From 2011 to 2012 alone, prices rose 3.5% as compared to 2% in the United States. The rise in prices, combined with the recently implemented austerity measures and extremely high unemployment, are heavily impacting the livelihood of Spanish citizens. As the average wage decreases, the buying power of money decreases as well. The frustration of this decreases in buying power has manifested in several, very large, worker demonstrations.

== Spanish banking system ==
The Spanish banking system had been seen as one of the most solid and best equipped among all Western banking systems for coping with the worldwide liquidity crisis, thanks to the country's conservative banking rules and practices. Banks are required to have high capital provisions and demand various proofs and securities from intending borrowers. Nevertheless, this practice was greatly relaxed during the housing bubble, a trend to which the regulator (Banco de España) turned a blind eye.

However, during the financial crisis, Spain's unusual accounting standards, intended to smooth earnings over the business cycle, misled regulators and analysts by hiding earnings volatility and losses. The accounting technique known as "dynamic provisioning", which violated the standards set by the International Accounting Standards Board, obscured the depletion of capital reserves, giving banks a false appearance of financial health even as liquidity problems mounted.

It was later revealed that nearly all the Spanish representatives in Congress had large investments in the housing sector, some owning up to twenty houses. Over time, more and more news emerged about the informal alliance between Spanish central and regional governments and the banking sector (for example, the government pardon of the second-in-command at Santander Bank, while all the major parties are significantly indebted with banks, and such debts are extended from time to time) which increased the bubble size over the years. Most regional semi-public savings banks (cajas) lent heavily to real estate companies that at the end of the bubble went bankrupt; the cajas found themselves left with the collateral and properties of those companies, namely overpriced real state and residential-zoned land now rendered worthless, rendering the cajas in essence bankrupt.

In stark contrast to countries like Ireland, no nationalization took place. Instead the problem was rolled over with the extension of the remaining real estate companies debts, while the central government bailed once and again banks and cajas alike. For more than three years, there was a steady process of bank concentration. Spain had the densest bank office net in Europe, which led many bank employees to be dismissed. By contrast, bank board members have mostly kept their roles, even those in merged entities. Golden parachutes have been prevalent: it has been speculated that this was because of the fear that laid-off senior members would talk about the sector's rampant malpractice. To this date, no bankers have been legally charged for having roles in this process.

In May 2012 the credit ratings of several Spanish banks were downgraded, some to "junk" status. The Bankia bank, the country's largest mortgage lender, was nationalized on 9 May, and on 25 May it announced that it would require a bailout of €23.5 billion to cover losses from failed mortgages.

In addition to Spanish banks, other European banks have a sizable presence in Spain. German banks lead with an exposure of $146 billion. Germany's Landesbanks entered the market during the early 2000s. Barclays, Deutsche Bank, and ING have large Spanish units.

On 9 June 2012 Eurozone finance ministers agreed that Spanish banks would be provided with up to €100 billion of rescue loans. This money was to be distributed via the Fund for Orderly Bank Restructuring, and the exact amount to be loaned would be determined after audits of the banks. EC President Jose Manuel Barroso and vice-president Olli Rehn welcomed the move, praising the combination of a "thorough restructuring of the banking sector", structural reforms, and fiscal consolidation; U.S. Treasury Secretary Timothy Geithner also welcomed the move. Bank stress tests would enable the Spanish government to make a formal request for the €100 billion credit line. Further analysis and tests would be undertaken prior to restructuring and recapitalization over the following year. Restrictions on the credit line exempting funds from covering "legacy assets" suggests limits to the planned banking bailouts.

In May 2012, Spanish banks lent €1.66 trillion to the private sector and took in €896 billion. Historically it would borrow the difference from foreign banks (i.e., interbank lending) but reduced access led to a greater reliance on ECB loans. Spanish banks borrowed a record €376 billion (net) from the ECB in July 2012. Depositors were fleeing Spanish banks; deposits dropped 4.7% from June to July (2012) as money was moved abroad.

On 28 November 2012, the European Commission approved the Spanish government's plan to shrink and restructure three major Spanish banks —Bankia, NCG Banco, and Catalunya Banc — and sell a fourth, Banco de Valencia. This is part of a €37 billion EC bailout or restructuring approved in June 2012. It included loss-taking by investors of up to €10 billion, the creation of a "bad bank" to absorb up to €45 billion of failed loans, closing thousands of bank branches, and reducing staff.

== Employment crisis ==
After having completed substantial improvements over the second half of the 1990s and during the 2000s, which put a few regions on the brink of full employment, Spain suffered a severe setback in October 2008, when it saw its unemployment rate surging to 1996 levels. Between October 2007 and October 2008, Spain had its unemployment rate climb 36%, exceeding by far the unemployment surge of past economic crises like 1993. In particular, in October 2008, Spain suffered its worst unemployment rise ever recorded and, the country has suffered Europe's biggest unemployment crisis during the 2008 crisis.

Spain's unemployment rate hit 17.4% at the end of March 2009, with the jobless total now having doubled over the past 12 months, when two million people lost their jobs. In this same month, Spain had over 4 million people unemployed, By July 2009, it had shed 1.2 million jobs in one year and was to have the same number of jobless as France and Italy combined. By March 2012, Spain's unemployment rate reached 24.4%, twice the eurozone average. The economy subsequently entered a second recession in 2011. The downturn lasted nine consecutive quarters, ending in the third quarter of 2013 when the economy recorded quarter-on-quarter growth of 0.1%.

In 2012, unions organized a general strike to protest proposals to weaken union power, enable cuts in wages, and lower firing costs.

By the end of 2012, Spain's unit labor costs improved. It narrowed the gap with Germany by 5.5% and 4.6% with respect to France. Spain's policy of internal devaluation cut public sector salaries by 5% with an additional 7.1% cut consisting of a suspension of the "14-month bonus".

Spain, as in other southern European nations, relies heavily on the inter-generational family structure for a significant portion of the social safety net. Employment expectations should be adjusted for this cultural ethos. The unemployment rate for the "principal breadwinner" is 12.4% less than the 25% overall rate (June 2012.) Employment is also found in the underground economy, which is estimated to be as large as 20% of the economy during the boom years.

Unemployment rate (INE)
Legislature	Period	Total unemployment	Annual change
8th (Zapatero)	2005 Q1	10.17%	−11.57%
8th (Zapatero)	2006 Q1	9.03%	−11.20%
8th (Zapatero)	2007 Q1	8.42%	−6.76%
8th (Zapatero)	2008 Q1	9.60%	14.01%
9th (Zapatero)	2009 Q1	17.24%	79.58%
9th (Zapatero)	2010 Q1	19.84%	15.08%
9th (Zapatero)	2011 Q1	21.08%	6.25%
10th (Rajoy)	2012 Q1	24.19%	14.75%
10th (Rajoy)	2013 Q1	26.94%	11.37%
10th (Rajoy)	2014 Q1	25.93%	−3.75%
10th (Rajoy)	2015 Q1	23.78%	−8.29%
10th (Rajoy)	2016 Q1	21.00%	−11.69%

=== Youth unemployment ===
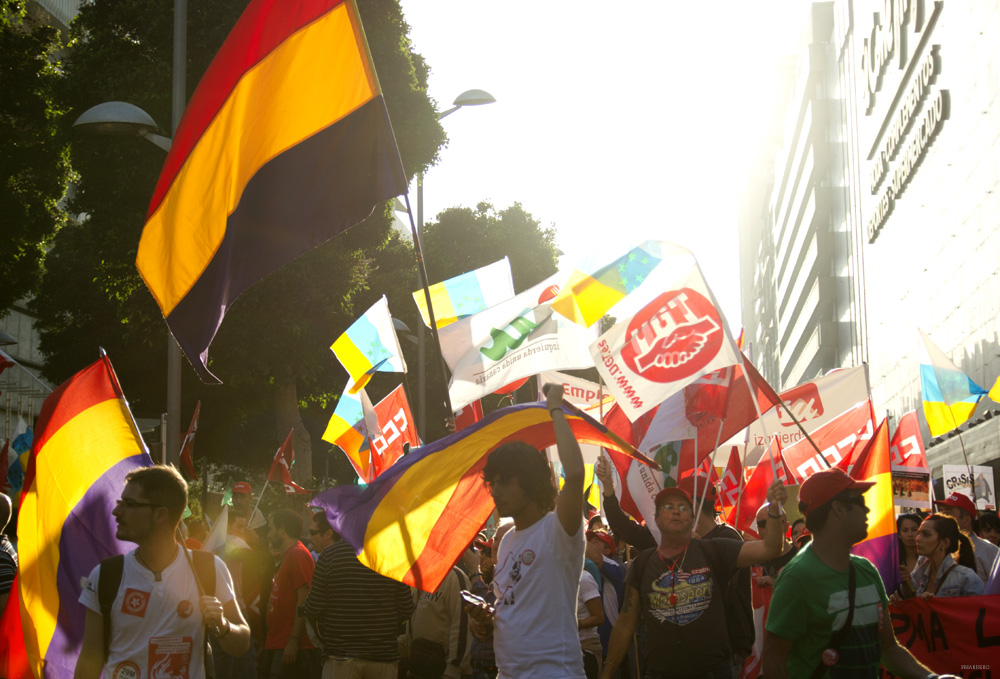
Demonstration against labor market reforms, Las Palmas de Gran Canaria, March 2012

Unemployment for those under 25 was reported to be up to 50%. Spain's current generation is considered the most educated that the country has ever had, yet it faces the greatest rate of unemployment in Europe. Roughly 68% of young people are willing to leave the country to search for a job, and those with college degrees are willing to settle for working at so-called minijobs for a paycheck. The State Secretary for Unemployment states that higher education is a way for the current generation to battle this issue; however, government cuts are occurring that slash university staff salaries and increase the number of students per class. For those paying their own way through their studies, the tough economy has made it nearly impossible to find a job and study simultaneously. Hopes for the future are dwindling as Spain's unemployment rate is almost as high as it was for the United States during the Great Depression. People are beginning to fear the transformation of this generation into one referred to as a "Lost Generation" that is constantly looking for work and whose futures are closed off from "good careers". The stress of unemployment has also affected personal relationships, with many young adults separating from their partners. Youth unemployment is about double the overall rate of unemployment.

The high unemployment rate, at 56% as of June 2013, has been considered to be overstated. Subtracting students and young mothers not looking for jobs, the actual number is closer to 22%.

=== From immigration to emigration ===
Large-scale immigration continued throughout 2008 despite severe unemployment, but by 2011 the OECD confirmed that the total number of people leaving the country (Spaniards and non-Spaniards) had over taken the number of arrivals. Spain is now a net emigrant country. There are now indications that established immigrants have begun to leave, although many that have are still retaining a household in Spain due to the poor conditions that exist in their country of origin. The crisis also produced a marked increase in income inequality. Between 2007 and 2011, the annual income of the poorest 10% of the population fell by 42.4%, while that of the richest 10% fell by 5.6%.

==== Tourism ====
As the financial crisis was getting started in Spain, it was already underway in the United States and other western countries. The decrease in disposable income of consumers led to a sharp decrease in Spain's tourist industry, a rarity in a country with so many coastal towns. Indeed, the EU as a group saw a decline in tourists coming to their countries in 2008 and 2009, with −13% tourism growth in coastal Spain. Despite its traditional popularity with Korean and Japanese tourists, the relatively expensive cost of holidaying in Spain led many to pursue "sun and beach" Mediterranean getaways in Turkey, Spain's tourism rival.

However, Spain has also seen the largest growth in tourism since 2011 and 2012. Its geographic advantages, the Arab Spring, and other non-economic factors are contributing to its resurgence as a tourist destination. While Spain's economy itself is not doing well, purchasing power parity is generally rising again. Furthermore, violent unrest in North Africa and the Middle East is redirecting tourists towards stable countries like Spain.

== Public debt ==
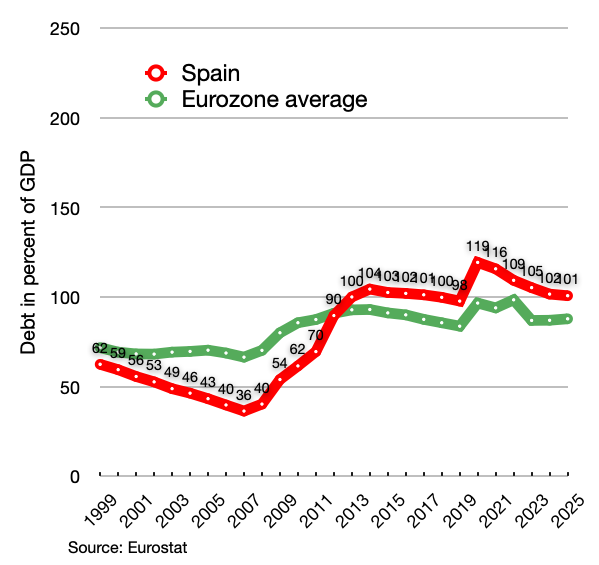
Spanish government debt as % of GDP vs. Eurozone average, by year

Spain entered the crisis period with a relatively modest public debt of 36.2% of GDP. This was largely due to ballooning tax revenue from the housing bubble, which helped accommodate a decade of increased government spending without debt accumulation. In response to the crisis, Spain initiated an austerity program consisting primarily of tax increases. Public debt subsequently increased sharply as the crisis reduced government revenues and increased expenditure. By 2013, public debt had reached 93.4% of GDP.

Prime Minister Mariano Rajoy announced on 11 July 2012 €65 billion of austerity, including cuts in wages and benefits and a VAT increase from 18% to 21%. The government eventually succeeded in reducing its budget deficit from 11.2% of GDP in 2009 to 8.5% in 2011, and it was expected to fall further to 5.4% in 2012.

As of 15 June 2012, Spain's public debt stood at 72.1% of GDP, still less than the eurozone average of 88%. If Spain uses the €100 billion credit line to bail out its banks, its debt will approach 90% of GDP. To avoid this, the EU pledged to lend to banks directly although it then appeared that the Spanish government might have to guarantee the loans.

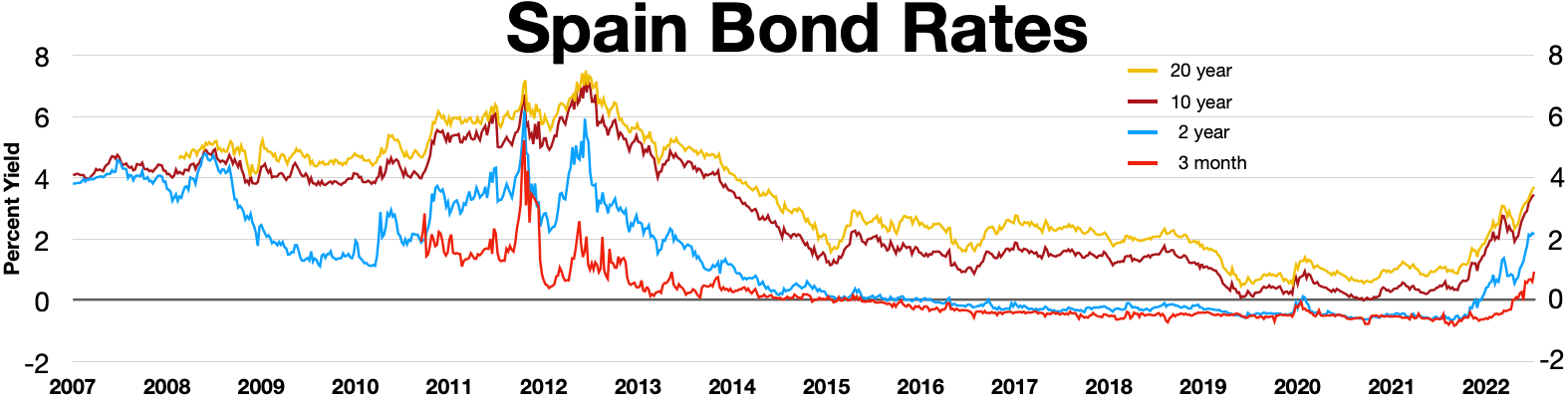
Spain bond rates 20 year bond 10 year bond 2 year bond 3 month bond

In June 2012, the Spanish 10-year government bond reached 7%, 5.44% over the German 10-year bond. As Spanish credit default swaps (CDS) hit a record high of 633 basis points and the 10-year bond yield at 7.5% (23 July 2012), Spain's economic minister traveled to Germany to request that the ECB facilitate government bond purchases to "avoid an imminent financial collapse". Promised borrowing by the ECB enabled Spain's 10-year yield to stay below or close to the 6% level, settling below the 5% level in the spring of 2013.

In 2016, public debt reached 101% of GDP.

== Ratings ==
For the third time in 13 months, Moody's Investors Service cut Spain's rating. On 18 October 2011 Moody's Rating cut Spain's rating by 2 notches to A1 from Aa2 with the outlook remaining negative. Standard and Poor's has downgraded Spain on 14 October 2011 and Fitch Ratings cut it to the same level on 7 October 2011. On 14 June 2012, Moody's downgraded Spain to Baa3, just one notch above "junk". Standard and Poor's downgraded Spain to BBB− (one notch above junk) on 11 October 2012. DBRS downgraded Spain to single-A, which remains higher than the major credit rating agencies. This rating allows the ECB to use a lower margin for banks that borrow with Spanish debt as collateral. After a more recent review, Moody's maintained Spain's investment-grade credit rating, removing the pressure on the country's debt. This decision by Moody's assured that Spanish bonds will continue to gain investor support; yields fell 5.50%, a level last seen in April 2012. Although Moody's can still downgrade the country's ratings in the future, the decision to not downgrade will encourage the buying of Spain's bonds.

== 2012 financial bailout ==
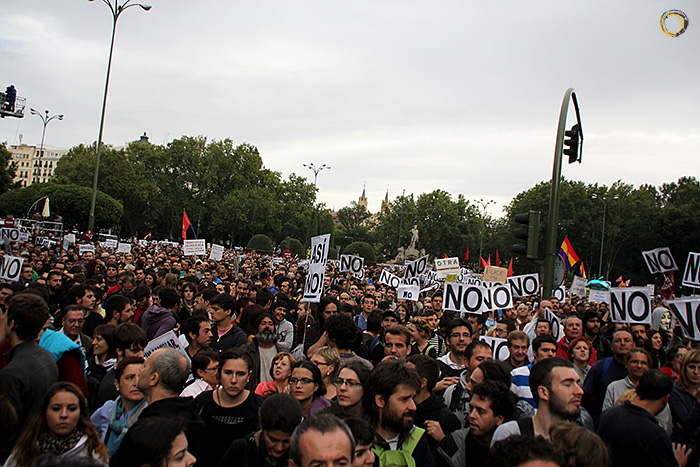
Demonstration in Madrid, 25 September 2012

On 9 June 2012 the Eurogroup held an emergency meeting to discuss how to inject capital into Spanish banks. The IMF estimated the capital needs of the Spanish banks to be about 40 billion euros. The Eurogroup announced intentions to provide up to 100 billion euro to the Fund for Orderly Bank Restructuring to the Spanish government. The Spanish government was then expected to give the appropriate amount of money to the respective banks. On 21 June 2012 it was decided that 62 billion euros would be shared among the Spanish banks in need. The European Union warned that rescued banks are subject to control and experts would meet stringent requirements.

Since then, the country's borrowing costs have reached levels deemed unsustainable in the long run, raising the prospect of a second aid program for Madrid following the 100 billion euro lifeline it obtained for its banks in June. Spain expected the European Commission to approve the restructuring plans of the banks needing aid on 15 November 2012 and then to authorize the disbursal of the first credit line of up to 100 billion euros within three weeks after that.

A larger economy than other countries that have received bailout packages, Spain had considerable bargaining power regarding the terms of a bailout. Due to reforms already instituted by Spain's conservative government, less stringent austerity requirements were included than for earlier bailout packages for Ireland, Portugal, and Greece.

In May 2010, the government of José Luis Rodríguez Zapatero introduced a fiscal consolidation package, which included a 5% reduction in public-sector wages, a freeze on pensions, the elimination of the €2,500 birth grant, and cuts to public investment. As the EU's fifth-largest economy, Spain remained a large concern. In 2011 the conservative Mariano Rajoy took over the government, pushing out José Luis Rodríguez Zapatero and his left-wing government. Trying to get Spain out of the highest unemployment rate in the European Union proved to be harder than expected. The bailout for Spain was estimated to be insufficient to restore the economy. With a serious level of debt in the country, substantial cuts would have to be put in place to restore the economy. Many youths are trying to find jobs abroad, creating a problem for the future domestic economy and job market. Rajoy proposed a new budget for 2013 that would cut government spending by 8.9%. By April 2013, unemployment had risen to 27%, but decreased to around 15%-16.1% as of February 2018, and Spain became one of Europe's fastest-growing economies, thus demonstrating that the country was improving.

== Separatist movements ==
One effect of the financial crisis is an increase in support for independence in Catalonia. The Statute of Autonomy included a package of laws that gave more power to the region and would have recognized Catalonia as a nation, although one still within Spain. As with the rest of Spain, Catalonia has had high levels of unemployment. As many as 22% of the economically active population were unemployed, which is still lower than Spain's national jobless rate, yet higher than Madrid's. In 2010, Spain's Constitutional Court weakened the Statute of Autonomy for Catalonia, which further irritated Catalan secessionist organization.

The 2015 regional election was the first to produce a majority for openly separatist parties. Prime Minister Mariano Rajoy insisted that Spain's constitution does not allow for a region to secede. Spain's Basque Country unsuccessfully tried to get such a move approved in Parliament in 2008. Catalan president Artur Mas instead scheduled an independence referendum for 2014, which was downgraded to being a more informal ballot after further intervention by the Constitutional Court. The dispute remained unresolved as of March 2015.

== See also ==
- 2008–2014 Spanish real estate crisis
- 2017 Spanish constitutional crisis
- (in Spanish) Annex: Political corruption cases in Spain
- Catalan independentism
- Corruption in Spain
- Economy of Spain
- Euro area crisis
- SAREB, bank set up to take over assets from the banks
- Spanish property bubble
- Unemployment in Spain
- Autonomous Liquidity Fund
- 1991 Indian economic crisis
- Stock market crash
- Stock market crashes in India
- List of stock market crashes and bear markets
