= Sareb =

Spanish state-backed bad bank

- Native name: Sociedad de Gestión de Activos Procedentes de la Reestructuración Bancaria
- Type: Bad bank
- Industry: Financial services
- Founded: August 31, 2012; 14 years ago in Spain
- Founder: Government of Spain
- Headquarters: Madrid, Spain
- Area served: Spain
- Products: Holding bad assets after bank restructuring
- Owner: Government of Spain
- Website: www.sareb.es

Sareb (Note: An acronym of Sociedad de Gestión de Activos procedentes de la Reestructuración Bancaria; English: Company for the Management of Assets Proceeding from the Restructuring of the Banking System) is the bad bank of the Spanish government. Its purpose is to manage and disinvest high-risk assets that were transferred to it from the four nationalized Spanish financial institutions (BFA-Bankia, Catalunya Banc, NGC Banco-Banco Gallego and Banco de Valencia). The company was formed in 2012.

The main drivers of the 2008–2014 financial crisis in Spain were the weaknesses, lending practices and failures of the savings banks in Spain. It had its roots prior to 2008 which the credit crunch and sovereign crisis have exacerbated. With the Spanish Royal Decree-Law 24/2012 of 31 August 2012, Sareb was created. The Fund for Orderly Bank Restructuring (FROB) held a majority shareholding of the financial institutions which in the judgement of the Bank of Spain require restructuring or winding up in accordance with Spanish Law 9/2012 (Banco Mare Nostrum, CEISS, Caja3 and Liberbank). Private shareholders own 55% of Sareb and the remaining 45% is held by the FROB.

The creation of a separate asset resolution entity was an idea proposed by foreign specialists. Their proposals were initially contested and resisted by the Spanish authorities but later accepted as being the appropriate response to the crisis

Sareb was established as a condition set by the European Union in exchange for aid of up to 100 billion euros to the Spanish banking sector. It was designed and developed from the work of three independent specialists: Oliver Wyman, BlackRock and European Resolution Capital (ERC).

Sareb functions as a bad bank, acquiring property development loans from Spanish banks in return for government bonds, primarily with a view to improving the availability of credit in the economy. Over the 15 years Sareb has to dispose of all of its assets, its main objective will be to maximise its profitability. However, it does not possess a banking license. Sareb enjoys legal advantages which do not apply to other Spanish limited liability companies (Spanish: Sociedad Anónima), such as status as a preferential creditor for subordinated debt over other creditors. The Spanish central bank is to establish the exact price of assets transferred to the institution by Spanish banks.

== History ==
On 31 August 2012 the Spanish government approved a Royal Decree-Law creating a bad bank. The law established that the FROB had the administrative power to oblige financial institutions to transfer to an asset management company (Sareb) certain assets: particularly impaired assets and assets which could be considered a threat to the viability of an institution. The aim is to remove the assets from the balance sheets of the institutions to allow them to be independently managed. The asset management company may issues bonds and securities recognising or giving rise to debt. The law establishes that the assets are to be transferred to the asset management company without any need for consent from third parties. Prior to transfer the Bank of Spain will determine the value of the assets based on appraisal reports.

For several years prior to 2008, the Spanish authorities had decided to ignore the problems associated with the cajas. These problems were essentially due to easy access at low borrowing costs which facilitated uneconomic lending practices, overly encouraged by local and regional governments. This provisional of 'loose money' fueled the growth of the property and constructions sectors of the economy; eventually leading to an unsustainable overexposure to these sectors at classic speculative bubble. The scale of impaired and bad debts were masked by the initial growth and then exposed by the effects of The combination of the global Credit Crunch and then Sovereign Crisis of the Eurozone which revealed these domestic problems and the scale threatened the Spanish economy. The Spanish authorities and successive governments refused to tackle the widespread and increasing insolvency issue. Piecemeal actions were taken as individual cajas entered insolvency and administration under FROB (such as Unicam) at huge costs to taxpayers or were forced by mergers into non-viable entities, such as Bankia (which itself eventually collapsed).

The Spanish authorities changed position as the two-phase refinancing failed. The weaker banks remained exposed. Three specialist firms provided assistance to the Spanish authorities.

A bad bank and associated asset management structure was designed and put in place to resolve the rapidly increasing book of toxic property loan by establishing price and a process of resolution. In addition, a set of policies were enacted between competing ministries as well as the appointment of a new governor-general for the central bank (Banca de Espana).

This initiative was already being demanded by housing developers enable a flow of credit from financial institutions. This measure is considered fundamental by the People's Party government to the process of restructuring the Spanish banking system and reactivating the country's real estate market. This assumption failed since the flow of credit has already not recovered as of 2017, more bank failures have occurred, and government's financial aid to banks have mounted since then.

== Structure ==
=== Investors and shareholders ===
Capital contributions and subordinated debt by shareholders and investors (February 2013, millions of euros)
Instit.	Cap.	Sub.debt	Total	Instit.	Cap.	Sub.debt	Total	Instit	Contrib.	Sub.debt	Total
Santander	207.40	598.20	805.60	Caixabank	149.30	431.90	581.20	Banco Sabadell	83.20	238.10	321.30
Banco Popular	71.70	204.60	276.30	Kutxabank	31.50	91.20	122.70	Ibercaja	17.70	51.30	69.00
Bankinter	17.00	49.20	66.20	Unicaja	15.80	45.60	61.40	Cajamar	15.00	43.40	58.40
Mapfre	10.00	40.00	50.00	Caja Laboral	7.40	21.30	28.70	Mutua Madrileña	6.00	24.00	30.00
Banca March	4.90	14.30	19.20	Cecabank	4.20	12.10	16.30	Banco Cooperativo	3.90	11.40	15.30
Deutsche Bank	3.70	10.70	14.40	Barclays	3.00	8.60	11.60	Catalana Occidente	3.00	12.00	15.00
Iberdrola	2.50	7.50	10.00	Axa	2.00	8.00	10.00	Banco Caminos	0.80	2.20	3.00
Generali	-	5.00	5.00	Zurich	-	5.00	5.00	Santa Lucía	-	4.00	4.00
Pelayo	-	3.00	3.00	Reale	-	3.00	3.00	Asisa	-	2.00	2,00
				FROB	540	1,652.40	2,192.40	Total:	1,200	3,600	4,800

In a press release issued on 17 December 2012, it was announced that Sareb had obtained 100% of its opening capital from 14 new investors, most of whom are private shareholders (55%), with the remainder coming from public capital (45%). The private shareholders are eight Spanish banks: Ibercaja, Bankinter, Unicaja, Cajamar, Caja Laboral, Banca March, Cecabank and Banco Cooperativo Español; two foreign banks: Deutsche Bank and Barclays Bank; and four insurers: Mapfre, Mutua Madrileña, Catalana Occidente and Axa. Six further banks later also became shareholders: the Santander Group, Caixabank, Banco Sabadell, Banco Popular, Kutxabank and Banco Caminos, along with the electricity company Iberdrola. From the end of 2012 to early 2013, the insurers Generali, Zurich, Seguros Santa Lucía, Reale, Pelayo Seguros and Asisa invested in the company through purchases of subordinated debt. Private investors have contributed 2.6 billion euros in capital and subordinated debt and the FOBR has contributed a further 2.2 billion.

=== Board of directors ===
The board of directors consists of Belén Romana as chairwoman of Sareb and Walter de Luna as general manager. The rest of the board consists of eight proprietary directors (Rodolfo Martín Villa, Ana María Sánchez Trujillo, Remigio Iglesias, Antonio Massanell, Francisco Sancha, Miquel Montes, Antonio Trueba, Iker Beraza Perez, and José Ramón Montserrat) and five independent directors (Javier Trillo, Luis Sánchez-Merlo, Celestino Pardo, José Ramón Álvarez Rendueles and Emiliano López Achurra).

=== Acquisitions ===
Before the end of 2012 Sareb acquired assets from four institutions (Bankia, Catalunya Banc, Novagalicia and Banco de Valencia) amounting to around 40 billion euros, in accordance with the restructuring plans approved by the European Commission on 28 November 2012.

In the first quarter of 2013 Sareb received assets from a second group, increasing capital and issuing subordinated debt in order to do so.

- On 21 December 2012 the Banco Financiero y de Ahorros-Bankia Group signed a contract to transfer assets valued at 22.3 billion euros.
- On the same day Banco de Valencia transferred assets valued at 1.9 billion euros.

=== Financial plan ===
Sareb aims to make a profit of 15% over its 15-year life, focusing on selling packages of assets at the best possible time to maximise their value.

Sareb manages real estate assets with a value of 40 billion euros, although they were recognised in the accounts of the transferring entities at 80 billion euros, implying impairment of 53%. At the start of 2013 the total assets under management rose to 55 billion euros following the acquisition of assets from 'Group 2' banks: Liberbank, CEISS, Banco Mare Nostrum and Caja3.

== ECB comments ==
On December 14, 2012, the European Central Bank (ECB) sent a report on Sareb, signed by its vice president, Vítor Constâncio, to the Spanish Ministry of the Economy in response to a request from the Spanish Secretary of State for Economic Affairs and Business Support for an opinion on the draft Royal Decree on the legal regime for asset management companies. Although the report was favourable it proposed limitations on dividend payments to ensure payment of the state-guaranteed debt used in the financing of Sareb. The report also warned of potential conflicts of interest at the shareholder banks and favoured vendor financing of assets.

The other point that the ECB focused on was how to facilitate potential purchases.

"The establishment of financing arrangements would greatly facilitate asset disposals by the SAREB. As the SAREB is not a bank, it cannot extend credit to potential buyers to facilitate asset purchases, but will be competing with banks which offer such financing to buyers of foreclosed and distressed assets. The terms of such financing arrangements should be competitive when compared with the terms offered by Spanish banks."

— OPINION OF THE EUROPEAN CENTRAL BANK of 14 December 2012 on asset management companies

The ECB stated that it considered it would be easier to recover the value of the assets from the bad bank if they were grouped and managed by independent specialists and favoured separation of assets as a means to boost the system's credit capacity.

"More generally, by facilitating the transfer of non-performing assets into a separate institution, asset removal schemes such as the SAREB assist participating banks in restructuring their balance sheets, which should, in turn, improve their financial soundness. By facilitating banking sector restructuring and recovery, albeit by transferring risk from the banking sector to the State, such schemes should positively contribute to banks' ability to extend credit and support economic recovery. In addition, the value of the distressed assets may be better recovered when consolidated and managed by independent specialists."

— OPINION OF THE EUROPEAN CENTRAL BANK of 14 December 2012 on asset management companies

== Background, the 2008 Spanish real estate crisis ==
The first bad bank in Spain was created by Caja de Ahorros y Pensiones de Barcelona. By transforming Microbank into Criteriabank the creation of Caixabank was made possible, which excluded the real estate assets included in Criteria 2.0 Inmobiliaria. This bad bank, which is unlisted, took on both Servihabitat, a subsidiary operating in the real estate sector and the interests in Inmobiliaria Colonial and Metrovacesa, as well as much of the industrial portfolio : Gas Natural, Agbar, Abertis, Port Aventura and Mediterránea.

In mid-November 2011 BBVA created a unit in which it planned to accumulate 30 billion euros in real estate assets, representing 80% of such assets.

The institution born from the merger of the Galician savings banks created a bad bank with their toxic assets, bringing together 11.15 billion euros of loans, of which 3 billion corresponds to mortgage loans for land and 1.9 billion has no associated mortgage. Following the Bank of Spain's appraisal, which reduced the opening capital from 1.71 billion euros to just 181 million, the former savings bank was left with 6.8% of Novagalicia Banco.

"...Real estate developers insist that the way out of the crisis, for the economy in general, but also for their sector, involves removing toxic assets from banks' balance sheets – valued at 176 billion euros by the Bank of Spain. They favour creating an entity to group these assets, restructure them, and put them back on the market when considered appropriate. The aim would be to get credit and the real economy flowing once again..."

— José Manuel Galindo.

In the opinion of the professor of the University of Valencia Joaquín Maudos, "the creation of a bad bank, by any means, is key to breaking the credit crunch."

Under the Irish model, the banking sector would transfer its assets to the state and receive in exchange government debt which could be used to obtain liquidity from the ECB and thus enable the sector to extend loans. Ireland broke its credit crunch, but many institutions went bankrupt and were nationalised with government debt. Under the German model, the state pays the banking sector the price on their balance sheets, minus any provisions made. In exchange, the sector assumes the risk that it will take some time for assets to return to the prices at which they were bought, with a distant cut-off set beyond which the institutions will assume the drop in value. In this model, the institutions agree to extend as much credit as they receive in aid.

Pedro Pablo Villasante, general secretary of the Spanish Banking Association (Spanish: Asociación Española de Banca) considers that the creation of a bad bank would be viable to assist unviable institutions, on the condition that they would accept to be absorbed by more solvent Spanish or foreign institutions.

The Platform for Nationalisation of Savings Banks (Spanish: Plataforma por la Nacionalización de las Cajas de Ahorro) considers that the new rectifications made by the Spanish government, allowing public funds to injected into financial institutions in exchange for toxic assets, will be beneficial for the banking sector and detrimental for Spanish citizens.

"...Once again we are seeing an 'anything goes' operation to save banking entities using public funds, whilst attempting to cover up the small question of who will end up paying for the party. You don't have to be a genius to see that the bill won't be charged to those responsible for the bankruptcies but rather the general public..."

— Carlos Sánchez Mato.

== The first attempt - real estate companies ==
Luis de Guindos indicated that, since there would be no public money The government won't create a bad bank, or anything of the sort.

Having ruled out the option of a bad bank Mariano Rajoy's government searched for a place where institutions could deposit real estate assets, many of which are covered by provisions, with the intention of selling them in the long term. This vehicle would not be a bad bank because it would not have a financial business. Real estate divisions were not suitable either, as they would be consolidated in balance sheets.

It was decided that banks would transfer their assets following an appraisal.

Theoretically, in being freed of the asset, the financial institution is also freed from the associated risk, and would thus no longer consume capital and would be able to extend loans to customers.

Spain is acting differently from the rest of Europe and the United States. In these areas the bad banks were created first, and then the financial system was recapitalised. The government of José Luis Rodríguez Zapatero and the Bank of Spain believed the financial regulations in place before the crisis would act as a buffer, which did not exist in any other country. The buffer, however, proved insufficient.

The Spanish stock market crash in April 2012 reflected a failure of the reforms implemented by De Guindos to restore confidence in the country's financial sector. The key issue is the price at which the assets are bought and who will assume the loss. The European bailout fund will also need to make a contribution, perhaps of 100,000 million.

== A bad bank or an asset management company? ==
The text agreed between Spain and the Eurogroup in the early hours of Tuesday 10 July 2012 included a commitment by the Spanish government to undertake substantial reforms of the country's financial sector. This reform, overseen by the European Central Bank, the European Commission and the International Monetary Fund includes the creation of a bad bank to group all of the toxic real estate assets weighing down banks' balance sheets.

This bad bank will receive funding from the European Union via two different means: a capital injection into the FROB from the European bailout fund and acceptance by the ECB of the bonds issued as payment for supposedly impaired assets. Spain will thus have an additional 20 to 50 billion euros to finance the bad bank, which will become a vehicle for the government and the financial institutions to group the financial sector's undesirable assets and later sell them.

Any institution that receives EU funds of any sort will be required to transfer its assets to the bad bank. The transfer prices for the assets have yet to be set and the Spanish authorities will submit a proposal at the end of August to create the entity,. which will start operating from November

.

For Spain to receive a bailout of its banking system, 32 short-term conditions have been set. One of these conditions, number 7, refers to the bad bank. At the end of August the governing regulations must be ready, and by November it must be operational:

"...7. Prepare a comprehensive blueprint and legislative framework for the establishment and functioning of the AMC. End-August 2012..."

— Condition 7

"...15.Adopt legislation for the establishment and functioning of the AMC in order to make it fully operational by November 2012...."

— Condition 15

The new governor of the Bank of Spain, Luis María Linde, started work immediately, as he stated when appeared in the Congress of Deputies, assuring the house that the possibility of creating a bad bank or toxic asset management company was being studied. The governor of the Bank of Spain stated that he was working on the project but did not have the necessary skills to manage it.

The 30 billion euros from the FOBR will be distributed between Bankia, CatalunyaCaixa, Novagalicia Banco and Banco de Valencia.

== Creation ==
Spain's Ministry of the Economy took the first step on 25 August 2012 by setting out the plans for the bad bank, as was agreed with the European Troika formed by the European Central Bank, European Commission and International Monetary Fund.

The FOBR has therefore contracted the services of Álvarez & Marsal, the consultancy firm which oversaw the winding up of Lehman Brothers, which specialises in problem solving. According to Expansión, the firm in turn hired Nomura, PwC and Cuatrecasas.

== See also ==
- 2008–2014 Spanish financial crisis
- Financial Assistance Programme for Spain
- National Asset Management Agency, a similar institution in Ireland.
