= Fundación Caja Cantabria =

Spanish banking foundation

Caja Cantabria Foundation
- Fundación Bancaria Caja de Ahorros de Santander y Cantabria
- Formation: 1989
- Key people: Gaspar Roberto Laredo Herreros

Fundación Caja Cantabria is a Spanish banking foundation based in Santander. It is the entity resulting from the transformation, in 2014, of Caja de Ahorros de Santander y Cantabria, a savings bank whose commercial name was "Caja Cantabria," which had transferred its financial activity to Liberbank in 2011. Its activity consists of the maintenance and dissemination of the heritage and the social and cultural work inherited from the savings bank.

On 20 September 2014 the General Assembly approved the transformation of the entity into a banking foundation, in accordance with the provisions of the Law on Savings Banks and Banking Foundations.

The foundation held part of Liberbank's shareholding (as of 31 December 2020, 3.302%).

After the merger by absorption of Liberbank by Unicaja Banco in July 2021, the shareholders of Liberbank (including Fundación Caja Cantabria) became shareholders of Unicaja Banco.

== History ==
The history of the origin of Caja Cantabria dates back to 1896, when Modesto Tapia Caballero, an industrialist from Burgos, left in his will a legacy of 45,000 pesetas, destined to unspecified charitable purposes. In 1896, the civil governor and social reformer Francisco Rivas Moreno decided to allocate 35,000 pesetas from Modesto Tapia's legacy to the founding capital of the Monte de Piedad y Caja de Ahorros. The first board was formed on 11 February that year, with the participation of the Santander City Council, the League of Taxpayers, the Chamber of Commerce, the Bishopric and the Provincial Council.

On 28 April 1898, coinciding with the dismissal of Francisco Rivas, the Queen Regent sanctioned the statutes of the new savings bank, and established the figure of the civil governors as chairmen of the board of directors of these institutions, until the legal reform of 1977. On 3 June 1898 the Monte de Piedad de Alfonso XIII y Caja de Ahorros de Santander was officially constituted.

The savings bank had its first premises at number 5 Pedrueca Street in Santander. At the end of 1902, the Board planned to expand the headquarters of the institution with the help of a legacy of 60,000 pesetas from the first Marquis of Comillas, to which would be added another equal amount offered by his son, the second Marquis, who recommended that the future building, located in the field of Tantín, had a mountain style, and was commissioned to the Catalan architect Luis Doménech, Gaudí's teacher. The first stone of the building was laid by King Alfonso XIII on 31 July 1905, and two years later, on 29 July 1907, the monarch himself inaugurated it (today it is the headquarters of the Obra Social de Caja Cantabria and bears the name of "Modesto Tapia").

In 1923 the XXV anniversary of the foundation of the entity is celebrated with the inauguration of an office in Hernán Cortés Street. In August 1947 the first branch was opened in Torrelavega, and in 1948 the building in Plaza de Velarde in Santander (today the head office) was designed, which was inaugurated in 1953, the year in which the institution was renamed Caja de Ahorros de Santander. This stage was characterized by expansion throughout the province.

In 1962, the first billion pesetas of borrowed funds were reached. In the 1980s it was renamed Caja de Ahorros de Santander y Cantabria and, at the same time, the Cazoña sub-central building was inaugurated to house the IT, organization and administration services.

The group's magazine began to be published in 1975, called La Revista de Santander, which in 1993 was renamed La Revista de Cantabria. It has been published in Santander since 1992.

The activity of the savings bank was mainly focused on retail banking and, within this, on the family sector, in which it held the leading position in the province. However, from the 1990s onwards, there was a shift towards companies, with the expansion of the range of products and services aimed at this sector.

On 24 May 2010 Caja Cantabria reached an agreement with Cajastur, Caja Mediterráneo (CAM) and Caja de Extremadura for the creation of an Institutional Protection System (SIP), known in the sector as a cold merger. Caja Mediterráneo (CAM) would have, together with Cajastur, the largest weight in the institution with 40% each. Meanwhile, Caja de Extremadura would have 11% and Caja Cantabria, 9%. On 25 September 2010 the general assembly of Caja Cantabria approved the integration, which meant the creation of the fifth Spanish financial institution and the third grouping of savings banks. The integration implied the creation of a central credit institution as the head of the group and a mutual solvency commitment among the members of the group. The new IPS was set up at the end of December 2010 under the provisional name of Banco Base.

In March 2011, it became known that the accounting situation of CAM was worse than previously thought and that the public aid that Banco Base would need (in the form of the purchase of shares by the FROB) would mean the nationalization of the entity, since the State would hold the majority of the shares. Faced with this scenario, Cajastur, Caja Cantabria and Caja de Extremadura voted, on 30 March, against continuing with the process. Days later, these three savings banks decided to resume the project, now led by Cajastur. Cajastur would hold 66%, Extremadura 20% and Cantabria 14%. Manuel Menéndez, president of Cajastur, assumed the executive presidency of the conglomerate.

=== Liberbank ===
On 23 May 2011 Effibank was incorporated as the SIP bank of Cajastur, Caja de Extremadura and Caja Cantabria. Since 19 July 2011 the bank has operated under the Liberbank brand name. Subsequently, Effibank's corporate name (Effibank, S.A.) was also replaced and became Liberbank, S.A.

The SIP created by Cajastur, Caja de Extremadura and Caja Cantabria, was developed through the indirect management of the banking business, established in the LORCA, in such a way that each entity maintained its legal personality and its Social Work. The SIP segregated its business as a whole and transferred it to the bank in exchange for a shareholding in it. The SIP was constituted with 66% owned by Cajastur, 20% by Caja de Extremadura and 14% by Caja Cantabria. It was agreed that the Board of Directors of the new bank would be formed by 11 members, of which 9, including the executive chairman, would be proprietary and 2 would be independent.

After the creation of the SIP, the commercial brand "Caja Cantabria" was maintained.

Unicaja Banco absorbed Liberbank on 30 July 2021, forming the fifth-largest financial institution in Spain in terms of assets.

=== Transformation into a foundation ===
On 20 September 2014 the General Assembly approved the transformation of the entity into a banking foundation, in accordance with the provisions of the Law on Savings Banks and Banking Foundations.

In April 2015, it was announced that the Liberbank group would operate throughout Spain under the Liberbank brand name only, and to this end, a process of remodeling the image and signage of the various branches would begin.

On 22 December 2015 Gaspar Laredo was elected as the new president of the Caja Cantabria Banking Foundation, replacing Eduardo Zúñiga, who resigned from the Board of Trustees the day before. In this way, Zúñiga brought forward his departure from the foundation which, in any case, would have taken place in June 2016 due to the incompatibility between the position of president in this entity and that of director of Liberbank.

== Shareholdings ==
As of 31 December 2020, the Caja Cantabria Foundation held 3.302% of the share capital of Liberbank.

Following the merger by absorption of Liberbank by Unicaja Banco in July 2021, the shareholders of Liberbank (including Fundación Caja Cantabria) became shareholders of Unicaja Banco.

== Social work ==
The entity projects its social activity through a strategic plan aimed at reinforcing the region's identity in five areas, namely culture, education, welfare, socio-economic and research. While its activities range from promoting and sponsoring sports and regional culture in general, it also helps in the preservation and conservation of the environment, all from a perspective of solidarity action.

These activities are materialized in its own programs and works, such as those based at the Modesto Tapia Cultural Center, the Palacio de Caja Cantabria in the town of Santillana del Mar and the Polientes Environmental Center, and in collaboration with town councils, institutions and groups in Cantabria that try, like the Caja, to contribute to the social welfare of the region and its economic development.

In 2014, Caja Cantabria's social work handled an annual budget of 3.7 million euros.

=== Sponsor of sporting events and clubs ===
Throughout the last few years, Caja Cantabria, has been an entity closely linked to professional sports in Cantabria. The entity sponsored Racing Santander, the Cantabria Handball Club (replacing Teka), Cantabria Basketball (Los Lobos-Caja Cantabria) and the Cantabria Rally during the 1990s.
