= Plaza de la Escandalera =

Spanish plaza

Coordinates: 43.3621°N 5.8479°W

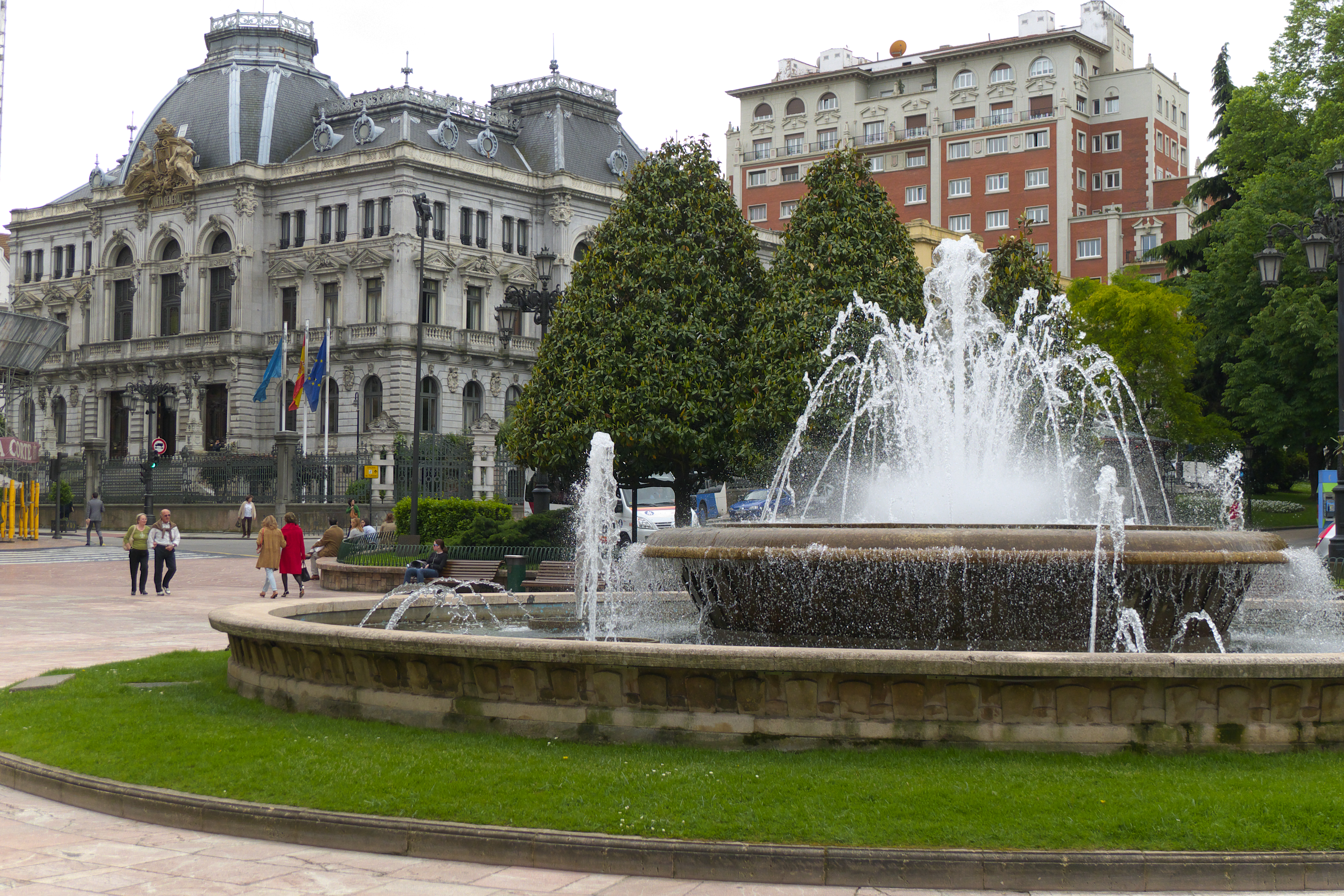
- Location: Oviedo, Spain

Plaza de la Escandalera is a plaza in Oviedo, Asturias, Spain. Its location between the historic and commercial centres of the city makes it a popular area to walk through.

The statue "Maternity" (La Maternidad) by Colombian-artist Fernando Botero is located in the plaza.

== Location ==
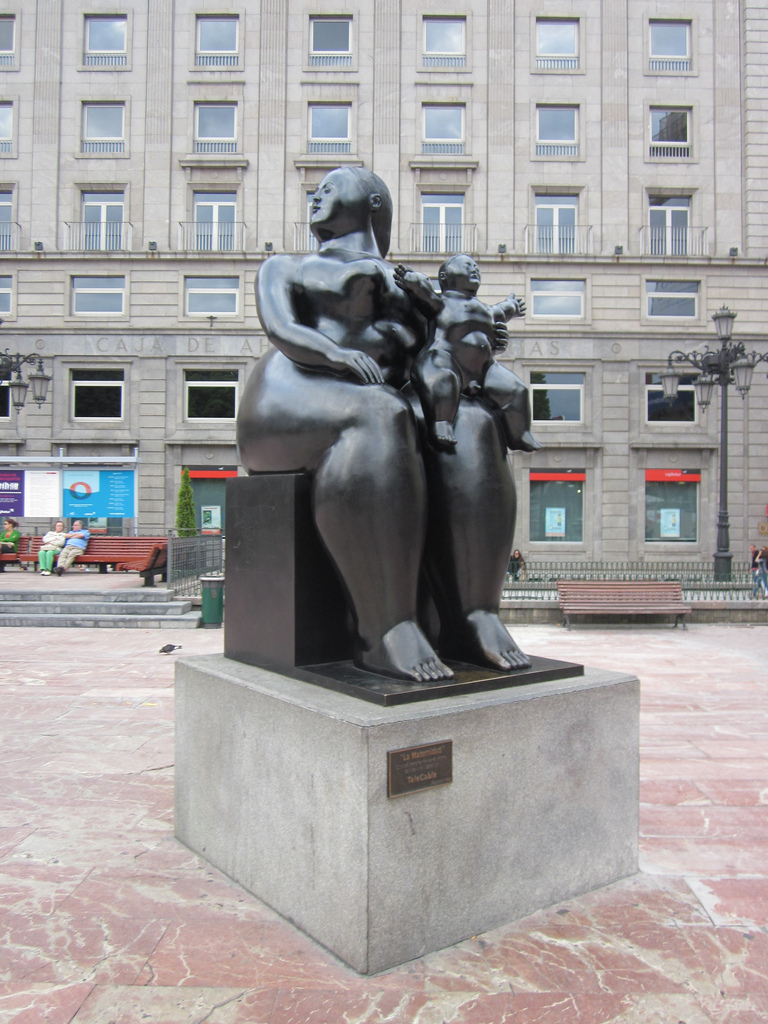
"Maternity" by Botero

The square is rectangular, bounded on its west side by the streets Paseo de los Alamos and Uria, which run parallel, and the Campo de San Francisco. On the east side, the street of San Francisco is in the south corner, Argüelles and, tangentially, the Pelayo are in the northern corner.

== Naming history ==
The square has had at different times the names 27 March, General Ordóñez, Republic, and Generalissimo and Escandalera. It has also had other name proposals such as Independence, General Meeting, and Plaza of the Heroes Noval and Ordóñez.

The name Escandalera began to be used unofficially beginning in the 19th century. At the time, Escandalera referred to the heated discussions, within the municipal corporation, in the press, and the village, as a result of the first house built in the corner of the streets of San Francisco and Fruela.

== Buildings ==
- Casa Conde: Fully occupies the north side of the square. It was designed in 1904 by architect Juan Miguel de la Guardia on a French-inspired eclectic style, as seen in its mansard roof and the domes on the roundabouts in the corners.
- The Municipal Tourism Office: A grey building called El Escorialín on the corner of the plaza.

== Gallery ==
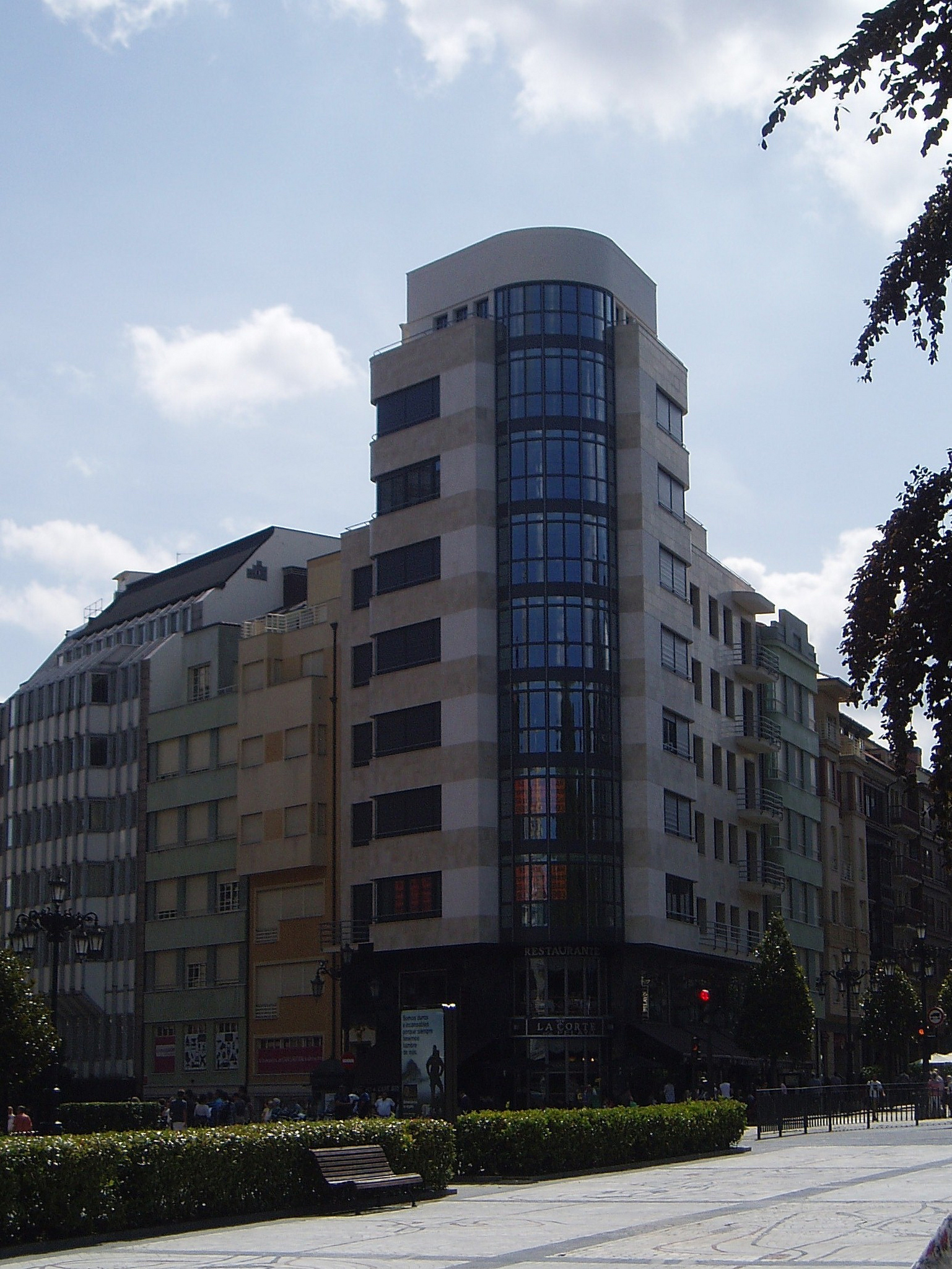
The Termómetro building

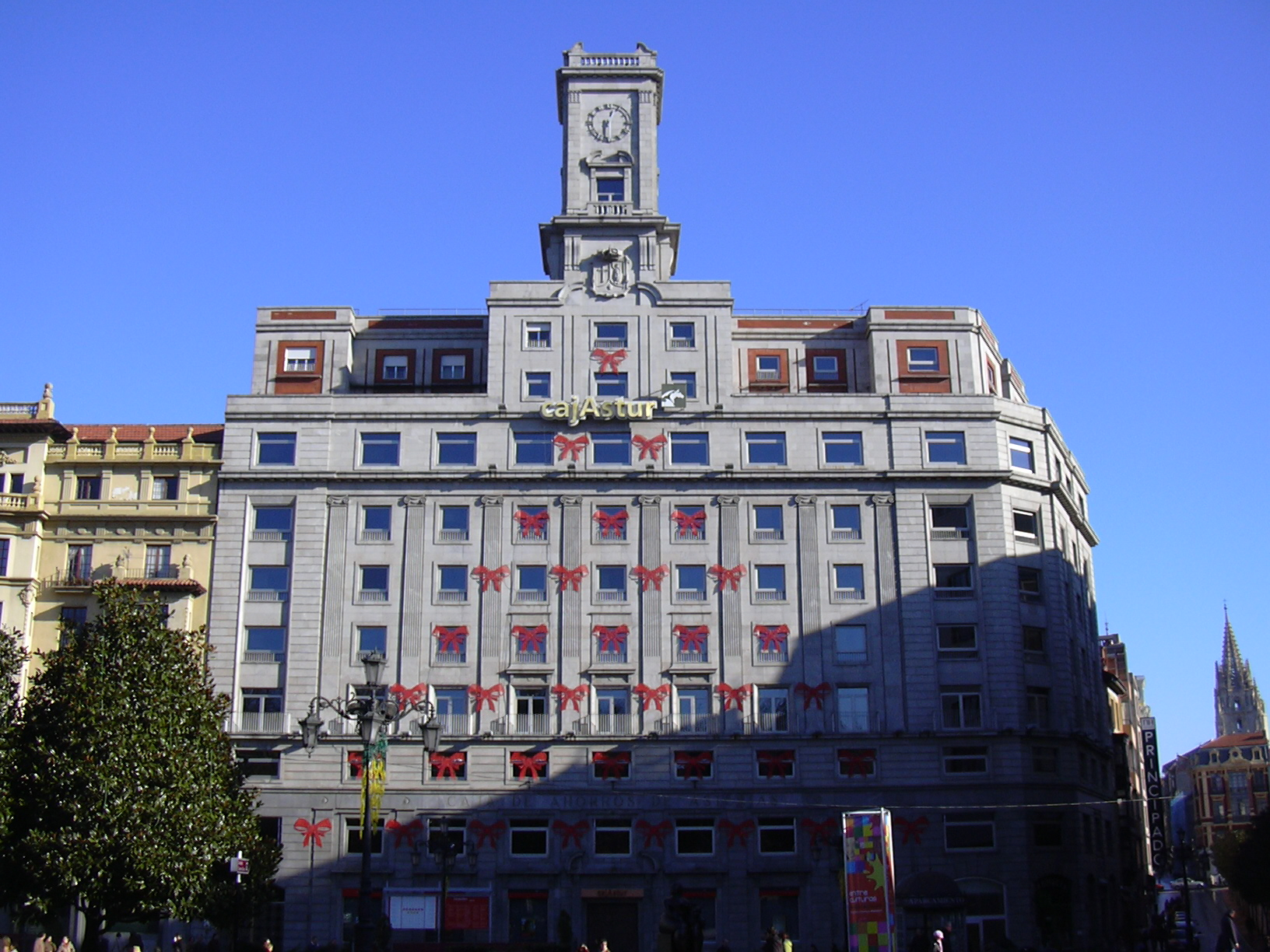
Cajastur savings bank

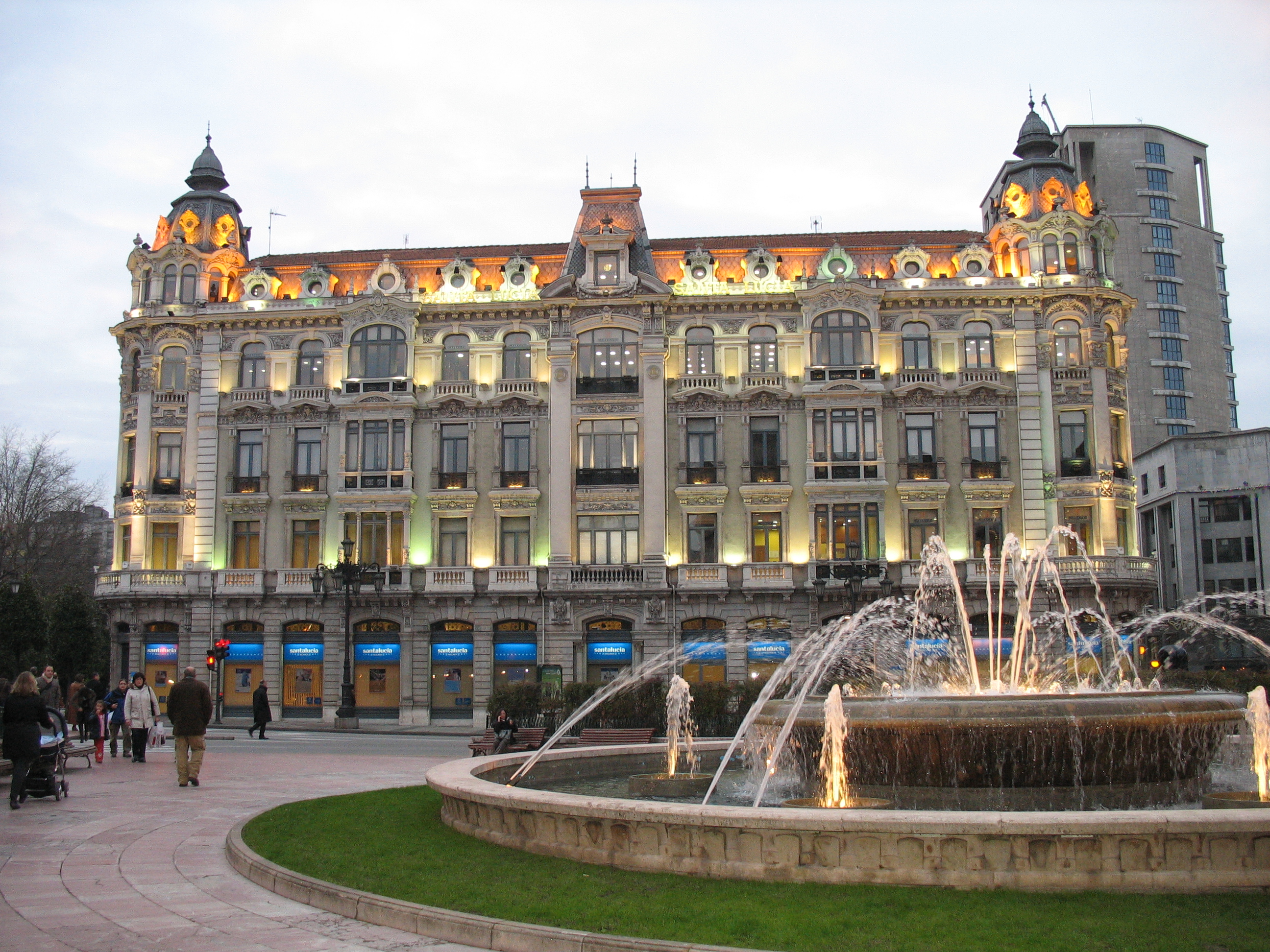
Casa Conde
