= Autonomous Liquidity Fund =

Credit line offered by Spanish Government

Autonomous Liquidity Fund (FLA) (Spanish: Fondo de Liquidez Autonómica) is a credit line created by the Spanish Government on 2012 because of the financial crisis. It is designed so that the central government lends money to the autonomous communities and that they do not have to finance their debt in the markets. It is run by the ICO (Official Credit Institute), under the Ministry of Economy. There is a common and indispensable requirement, which forces the autonomous communities that cling to the Fund to allocate the money to pay the debt with the banks or financial entities mainly.

== Financing per year ==
=== 2012 ===
In the first year, 9 autonomous communities requested the Fund and in total, the central government delivered €16.6 billion:

- Andalusia received €2.8 billion.
- Castilla-La Mancha received € 1 billion.
- Catalonia received €6.7 billion.
- The Canary Islands received €906.9 million.
- Valencian Community received €3.8 billion.
- Asturias received €261.5 million.
- The Balearic Islands received €471.7 million.
- Cantabria received €137.1 million.
- Murcia received €536.7 million.

=== 2013 ===
In the second years, other 9 autonomous communities requested the money of the Fund, being delivered by the government almost €20 billion.

- Andalusia received €3.8 billion.
- Castilla-La Mancha received € 673.4 million.
- Catalonia received €10 billion.
- The Canary Islands received €654.2 million.
- Valencian Community received €2.6 billion.
- Asturias received €391.7 million.
- The Balearic Islands received €695.2 million.
- Cantabria received €263.1 million.
- Murcia received €701.1 million.

=== 2014 ===
In 2014, Asturias did not request money from the Fund, however, it was requested by Extremadura, and once again, 9 the Autonomous Communities that requested the Fund. €23.2 billion were delivered this year.

- Andalusia received €4 billion.
- Castilla-La Mancha received € 1.6 billion.
- Catalonia received €8 billion.
- The Canary Islands received €816.7 million.
- Valencian Community received €6 billion.
- Extremadura received €178 million.
- The Balearic Islands received €695.2 million.
- Cantabria received €344.6 million.
- Murcia received €1.1 billion.

=== 2015 ===
In this year, 5 autonomous communities requested the FLA. The rest were financed through another fund (Financial Facility Fund). €22.5 billion were delivered.

- Castilla-La Mancha received € 1.1 billion.
- Catalonia received €11.1 billion.
- Valencian Community received €8.6 billion.
- Cantabria received €361.6 million.
- Murcia received €1.1 billion.

=== 2016 ===
In 2016, €28.3 billion were distributed among 9 autonomous communities.

- Andalusia received €4.3 billion.
- Castilla-La Mancha received € 1.8 billion.
- Catalonia received €10 billion.
- Aragon received €1 billion.
- Valencian Community received €7 billion.
- Extremadura received €806.3 million.
- The Balearic Islands received €1.3 billion.
- Cantabria received €458 million.
- Murcia received €1.4 billion.

Apart from those mentioned, the Canary Islands and Galicia were financed by the Financial Facility Fund.

== Endowment of the fund ==
Since its creation, the fund has distributed more than €110 billion, from the Ministry of Treasury, banks or financial entities interested in investing in this type of funds.
