= Banco de Valencia =

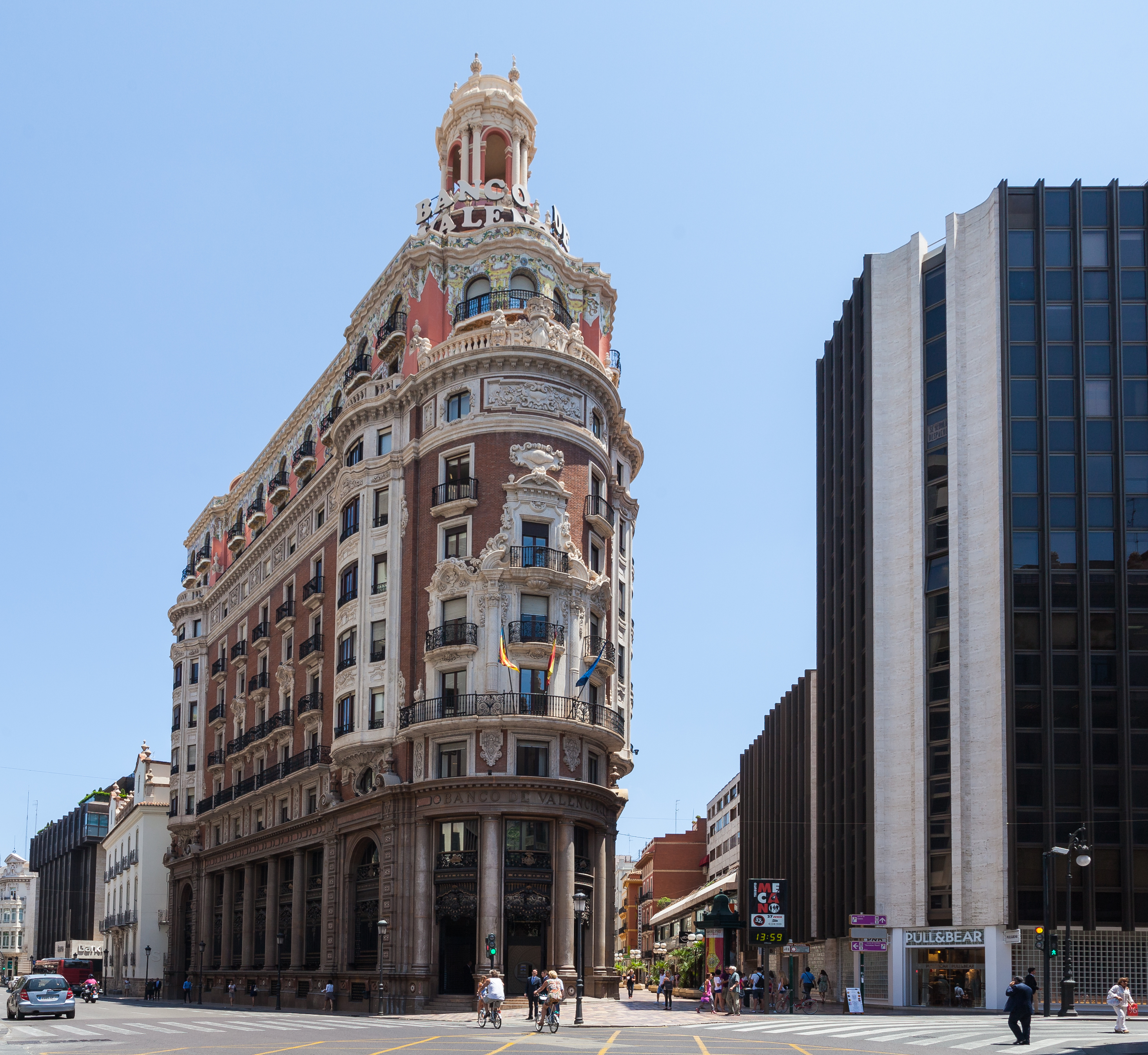
- Headquarters of the Bank of Valencia, city of Valencia
- Company type: Public
- Traded as: BMAD: BVA
- Industry: Banking
- Headquarters: Valencia, Spain
- Products: Banking; Investment banking Investment management
- Website: www.bancodevalencia.com

The Bank of Valencia was the sixth bank in Spain, and had its headquarters in the city of Valencia.

== History ==
It was founded on March 20, 1900, and its first president Jose Tartiere Lenegre. Ten years later, the bank already appeared in the Industrial and Commercial Guide of Valencia. In 1927 he assumed the presidencia of the entity Vincent Noguera Bonora, a year later inaugurate the central office on the street Alfredo Calderon of Valencia. A year later, the bank bought the Bank of Castellon.

In 1936 the institution opened an office in San Sebastian. In 1940, there was a change of president, bowing to the post Antonio Noguera Bonora, a post that was occupied in 1954 by Ignacio Villalonga Villalba. In the 1950s became popular collection calendars issued by the entity. In 1964 he entered the office of president Joaquin Rodriguez Reig.

In 1974 the bank launched its Computing Center, and in 1978 its first office in Madrid. In 1984 he returned to have a new change in the presidency, and the new president Antonio Girona Busutil. In late 1980, in 1989 the bank reached 230 offices. In the years 1990 1993 1994 1997 Antonio J. Jimenez Tirado. Following a course of expansion, the Bank of valence purchased in 1997 the Bank of Murcia, although the merger occurred in 2002. That same year, the Bank of Valencia opened its first store bag.

By the year 2000 the entity celebrated its centenary with the organization of various events and celebrations. The number of offices of the entity reached 350 in 2003. In 2004, to be President of the Generalitat Valenciana, Jose Luis Olivas Martinez took the helm of the institution.

In November 2011, the bank was taken over by the Spanish government, after the bank failed to meet adequate Tier 1 capital ratios.

On June 27, 2012, the FROB injected €998 million into Banco de Valencia as capital, acquiring 90.89% of the bank's shares.

On November 27, 2012, the FROB announced a €4.5 billion capital injection into Banco de Valencia and transferred the bank to CaixaBank for a symbolic price of one euro. The FROB provided a protection scheme covering 72.5% of losses from a specific asset portfolio for 10 years. Assets were also moved to the "bad bank," and hybrid capital holders faced losses.

On February 28, 2013, CaixaBank finalized the acquisition of 98.9% of Banco de Valencia after regulatory approval. The asset protection scheme became effective, covering 72.5% of losses from SMEs and guarantees.

In July 2013, Banco de Valencia was fully integrated into CaixaBank, with the brand retained in Valencia and Castellón offices.

In June 2015, Santiago Pedraz summoned former Socialist minister Antonio Asunción and former Valencian Union leader Társilo Piles as defendants for the sale of the Acuigroup Maremar fish farm to the financial institution.

In July 2015, National Court Judge Juan Pablo González released José Luis Olivas with precautionary measures and sent Aurelio Izquierdo, former CEO of Bancaja and former president of Banco de Valencia, to prison; José Cortina, former deputy CEO of the bank; as well as two businessmen after charging them with corruption offenses for the loans that Bancaja and Banco de Valencia granted to finance real estate investments in the Caribbean.

== Gallery ==
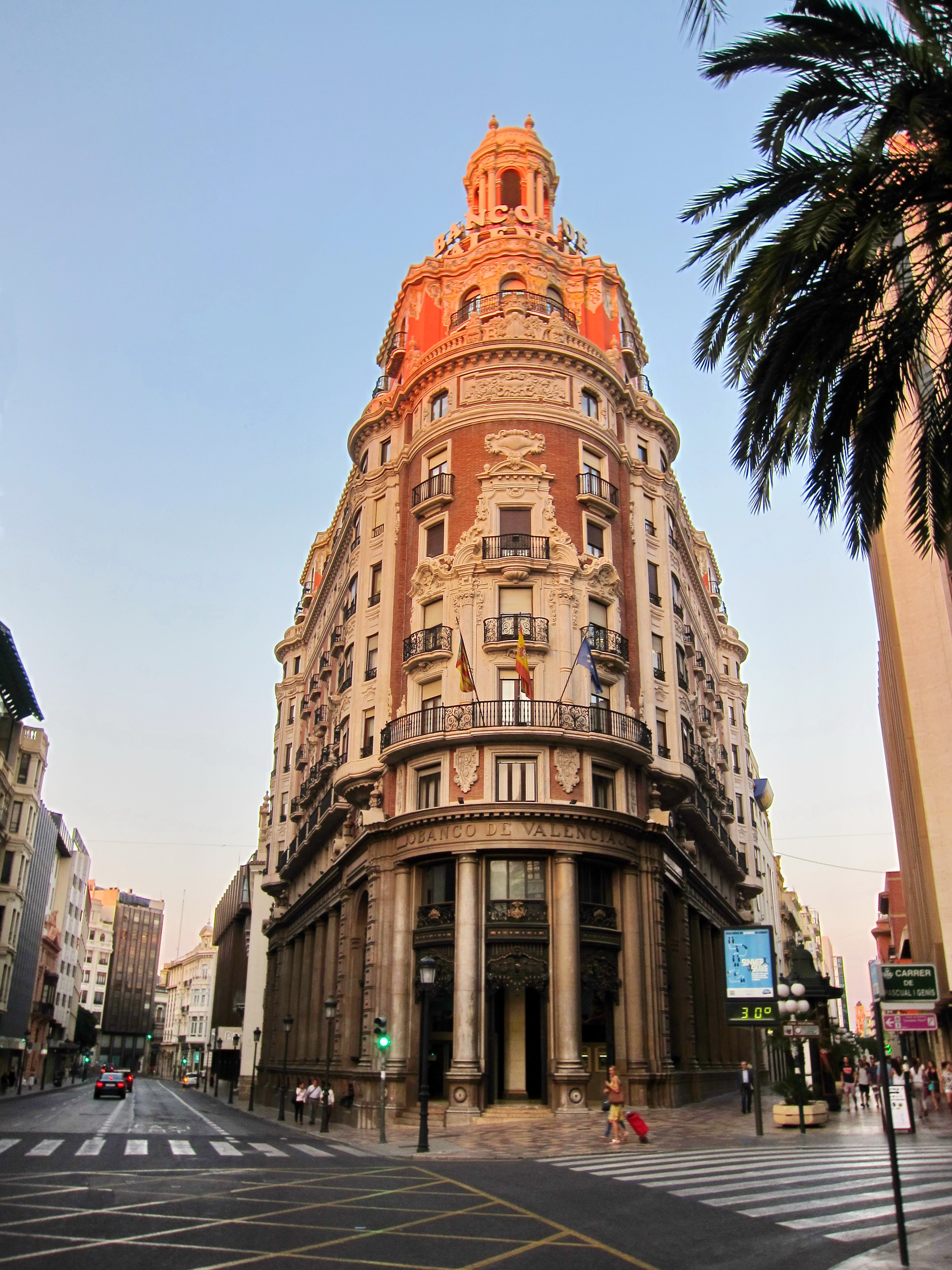

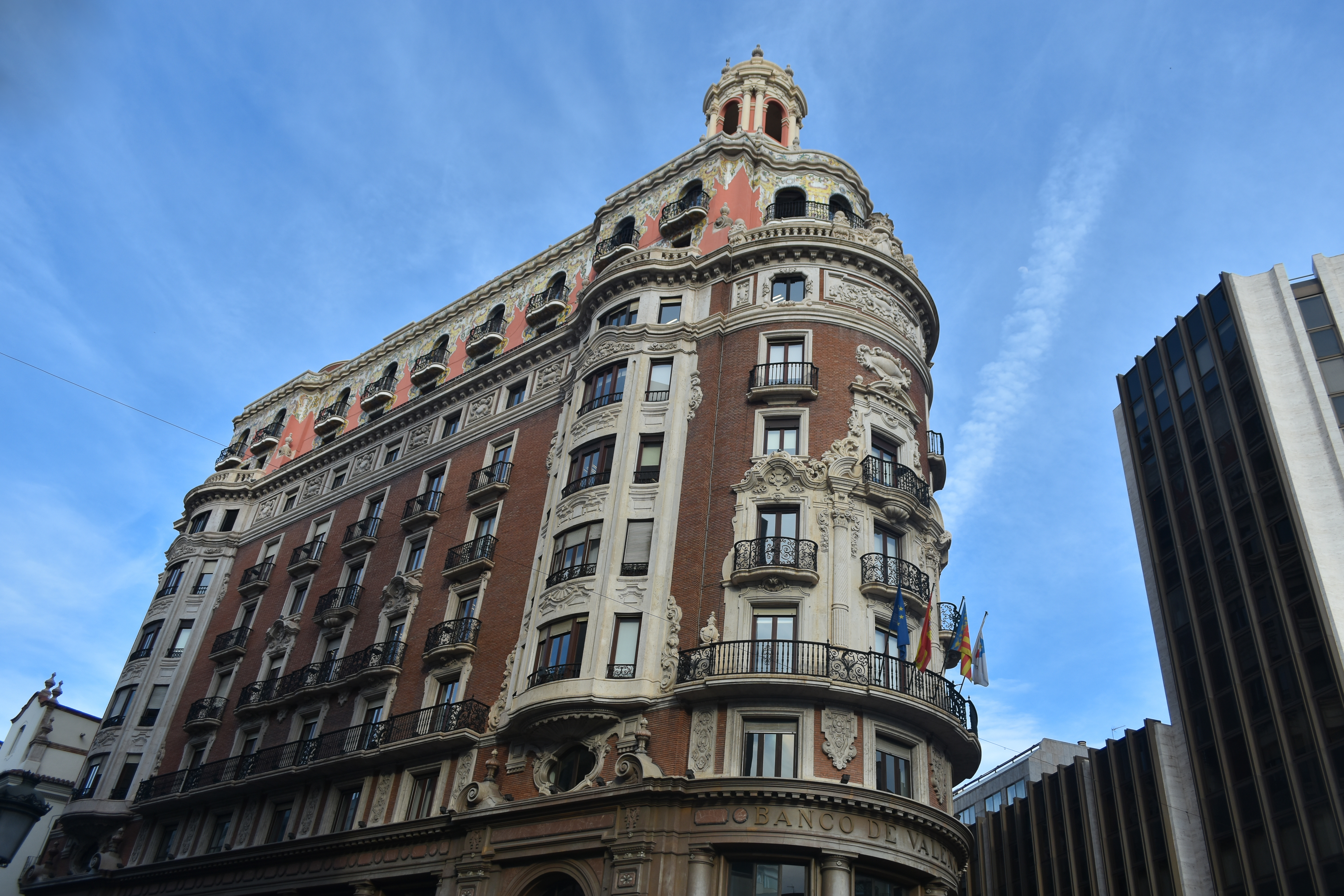

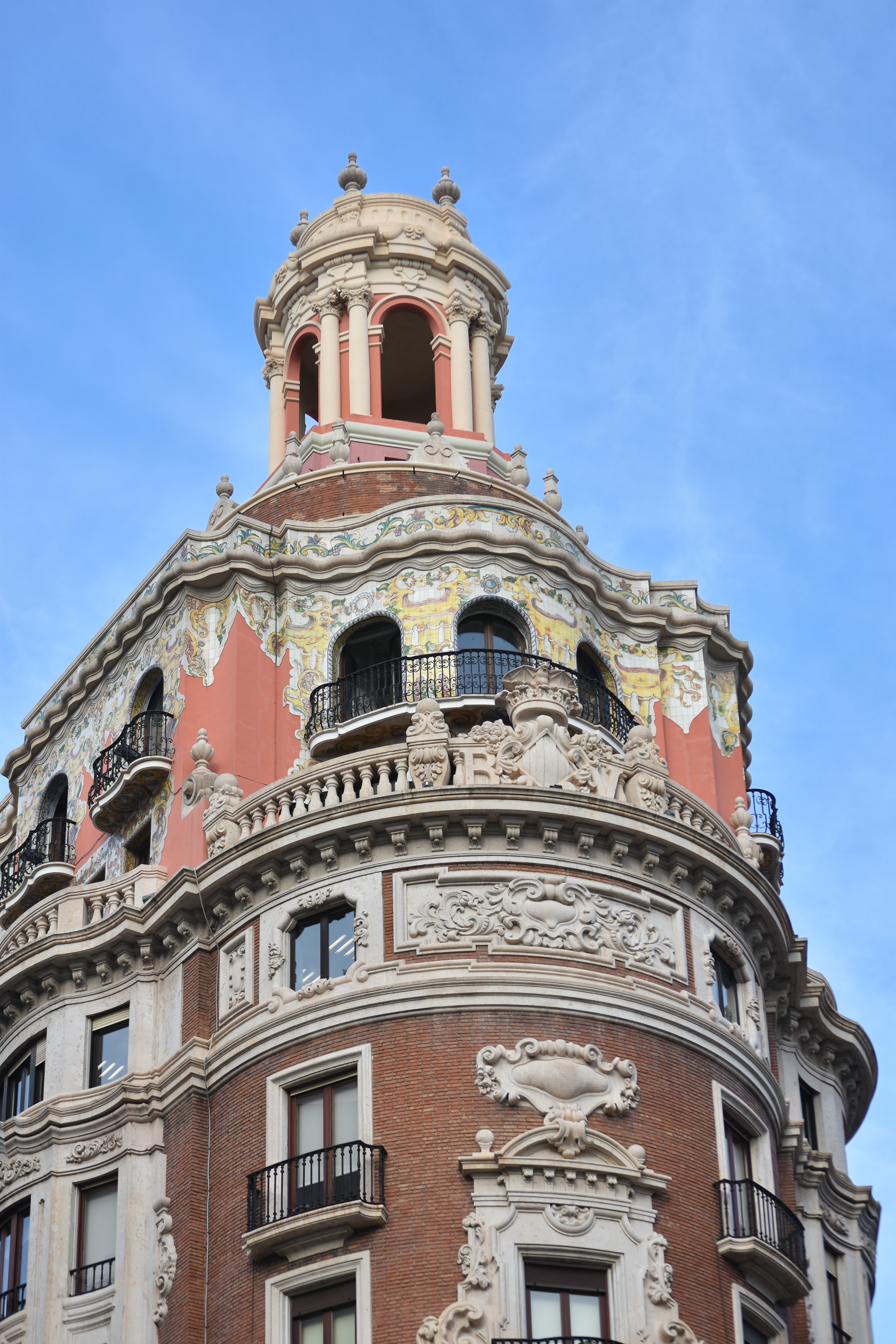

== See also ==
- List of flatiron buildings
- List of banks in Spain
