= Cajastur =

Spanish banking foundation

Caja de Ahorros de Asturias
- Company type: Savings and loan association
- Industry: Finance and Insurance
- Founded: 1946
- Headquarters: Oviedo, Principality of Asturias
- Key people: Manuel Menéndez Menéndez

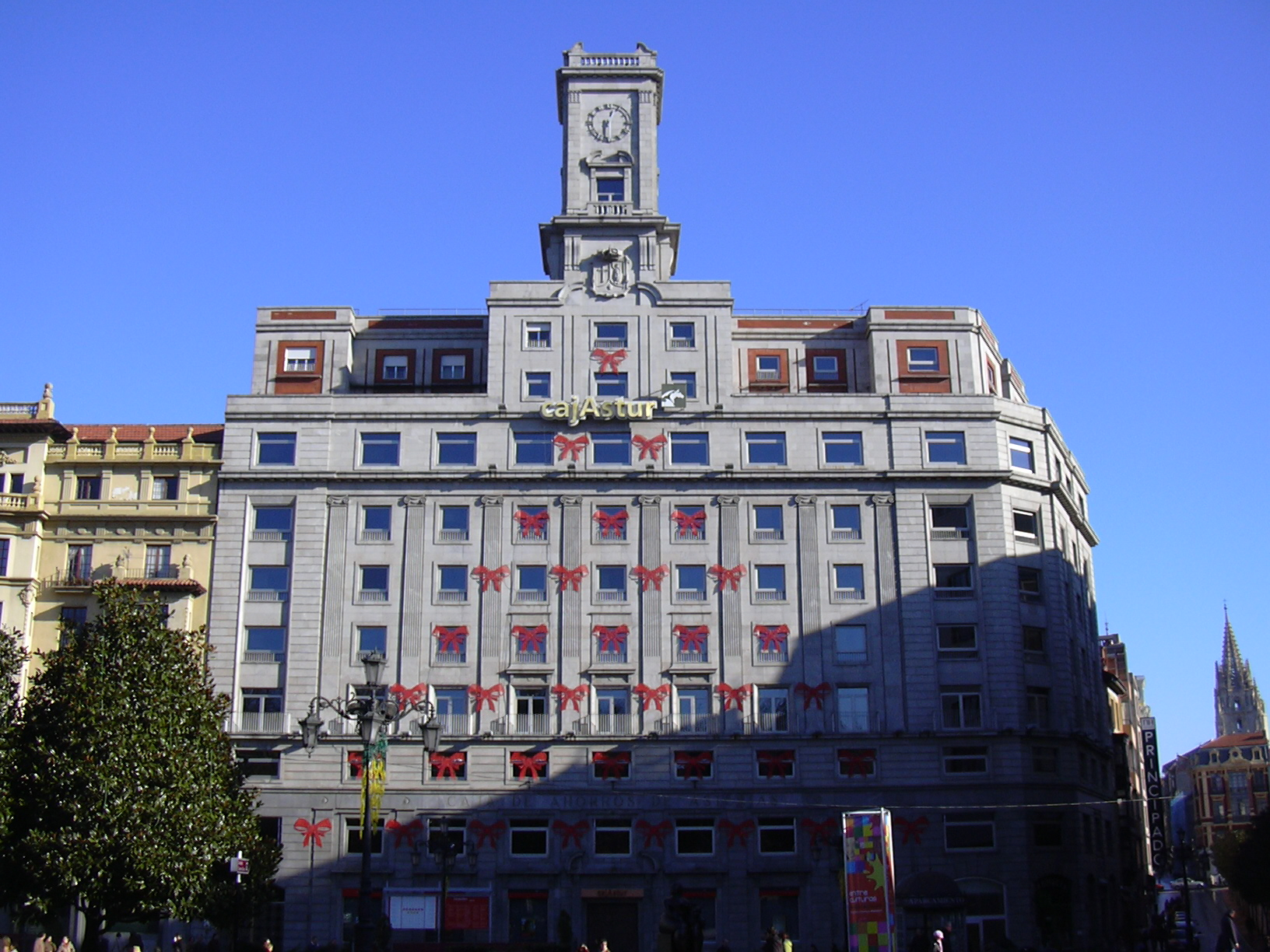
Cajastur savings bank in Plaza de la Escandalera, Oviedo

The Caja de Ahorros de Asturias (Cajastur) is a savings and loan association of the Principality of Asturias. Caja de Ahorros de Asturias is the trade name of the enterprise while Cajastur is the commercial brand name it commonly uses.

Its activities concentrate on retail banking, focusing primarily on the economic necessities of regional households, local corporations, and small and medium-sized enterprises.

== History ==
The origin of the bank date back to 1880, when the Monte de Piedad y Caja de Ahorros de Oviedo was founded. It became the Caja de Ahorros de Asturias in 1946 after a merger with the Caja de Ahorros y Monte de Piedad Municipal de Gijón.

Presently Cajastur has around 200 offices in Asturias and some 40 outside the Principality. It controls the Asturian telecommunications enterprise TeleCable.

On September 21, 2010, Cajastur took definitive control of the financial business of Caja Castilla-La Mancha (CCM) with the notarization and presentation to the Mercantile Registry of the agreements and contracts for the segregation of assets of the Castilian-La Mancha entity and the incorporation of all its financial business (branches, brand, customers, deposits, loans and other financial products) to Banco Liberta, a subsidiary of Cajastur. This entity, which had moved its headquarters from Oviedo to Cuenca a few months before, elevated this change of domicile and also the substitution of its corporate name to public status on the same day, so that Banco Liberta, S.A. became Banco Castilla-La Mancha, S.A.

In 2011 it was integrated into Liberbank. On July 23, 2014, the General Assembly approved the transformation of the entity into a banking foundation, in accordance with the provisions of the Law on Savings Banks and Banking Foundations. In April 2015, it was announced that the Liberbank group would operate throughout Spain under the Liberbank brand name only, and to this end, a process of remodeling the image and signage of the different branches would begin. As of December 31, 2020, the foundation held a 15.86% stake in Liberbank.

On June 30, 2016, Manuel Menéndez resigned from his position as head of the foundation in compliance with the Law on Savings Banks and Banking Foundations, which established the incompatibility of holding simultaneous positions on the boards of banking foundations and on the boards of directors of the banks to which the former savings banks had transferred their financial businesses. He was succeeded by César Menéndez Claverol.

Following Liberbank's merger into Unicaja Banco in 2021, its shareholders, including Fundación Cajastur, became Unicaja Banco shareholders. On July 30, 2021, the foundation's stake in Unicaja Banco was 6.56%.

== See also ==
- List of banks in Spain
