= Liberbank =

Defunct Spanish bank

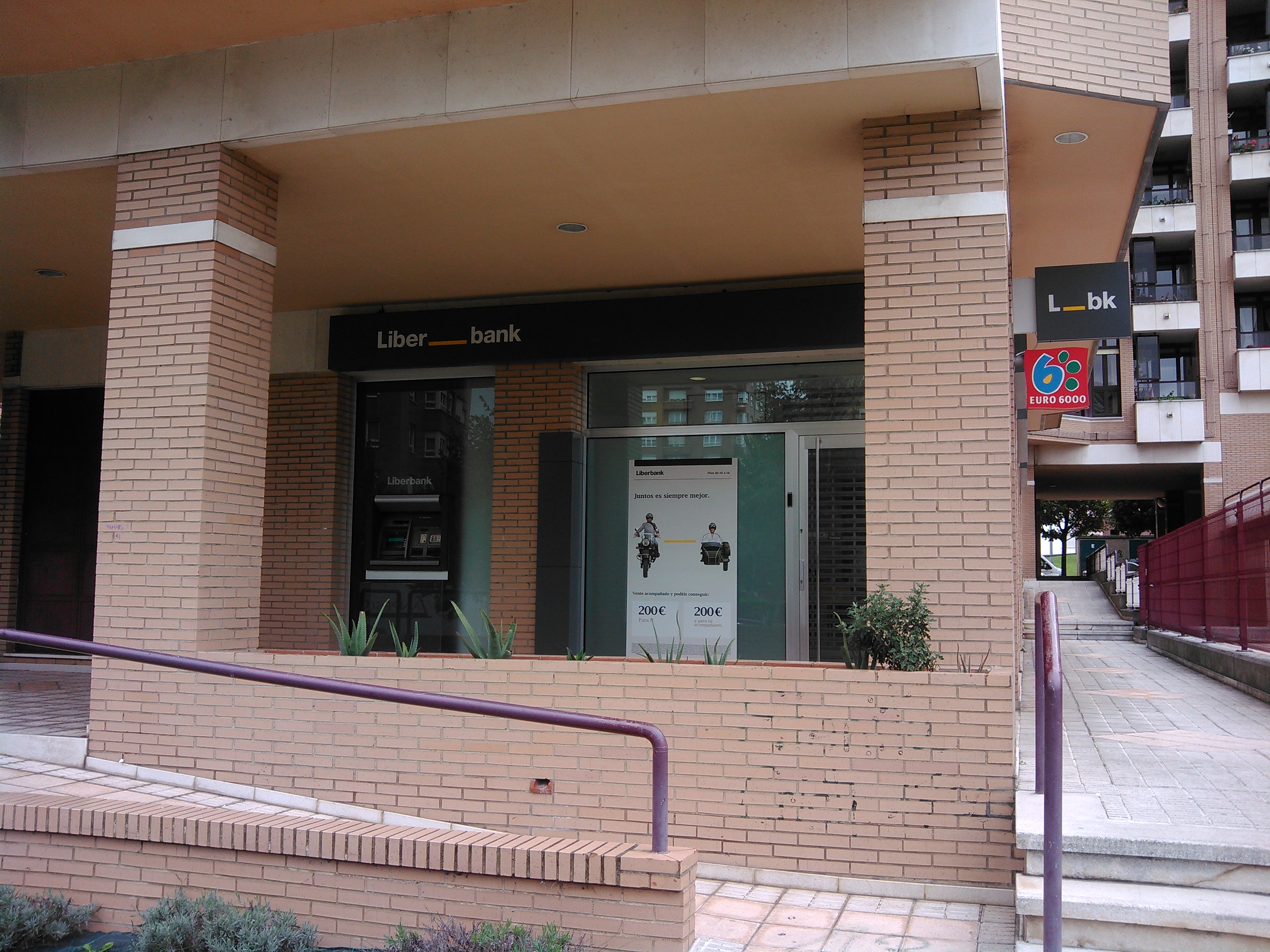
- Liberbank branch in Montevil 2015
- Company type: Sociedad Anónima
- Traded as: Formerly BMAD: LBK
- ISIN: Formerly ES0168675090
- Industry: Financial services
- Predecessor: Group Cajastur, Caja de Extremadura and Caja Cantabria
- Founded: 23 May 2011
- Defunct: 30 July 2021
- Fate: Acquired and merged
- Successor: Unicaja
- Headquarters: Madrid, Spain
- Area served: Spain
- Key people: Pedro Manuel Rivero Torre (Non-executive Chairman); Manuel Menéndez Menéndez (CEO)
- Products: Banking services
- Number of employees: ▼3,760 (2019)
- Website: www.liberbank.es

Liberbank was a Spanish bank and financial services company that operated between 2011 and 2021 when it was acquired and merged with Spanish bank Unicaja.

Prior to its merger, Liberbank had a national presence and was a leader in the retail markets of Asturias, Cantabria, Castile-La Mancha and Extremadura. The bank was established in 2011 from the merger of the banking businesses of the three savings banks, Group Cajastur, Caja de Extremadura and Caja Cantabria. The merger excluded the social and community work that the banks provided which continued separately.

== History ==
On 23 May 2011, Effibank was established as a bank SIP Group Cajastur, Caja de Extremadura and Caja Cantabria. From 19 July 2011, the bank operated under the brand Liberbank. Subsequently, the trade name of Effibank (Effibank SA) was also replaced and became Liberbank SA.

On 29 May 2012, Banco Caja3 and Ibercaja merged. This would have created the seventh largest Spanish financial institution. However, the merger was canceled in October 2012 as a result of the stress test performed by Oliver Wyman showing it failed the capital requirements test.

On 20 December 2012, the European Commission approved the restructuring plan for Liberbank, so that the entity could go public in the first half of 2013, reducing its size by 25% compared to 2010. In return, Liberbank received 124 million euros in aid in the form of contingent convertible bonds (cocos) subscribed by the Fondo de Reestructuración Ordenada Bancaria (FROB) with a maximum repayment term of two years. A drastic reorientation of the business of the bank was also required that included having to leave the real estate business, focusing on the credit support to SMEs in their areas of influence and primarily engage in the retail banking, limiting their presence in the business of wholesale banking.

On 16 May 2013, Liberbank went public with a sale of redeemable preference shares and subordinated shares in the company and closed the session with a capitalization of 734 million Euro.

On 30 December 2020, it was announced Unicaja was buying Liberbank. The merged company created the fifth largest bank in Spain.

== See also ==
- List of banks in Spain
