= Fondo de Reestructuración Ordenada Bancaria =

FROB Executive Resolution Authority

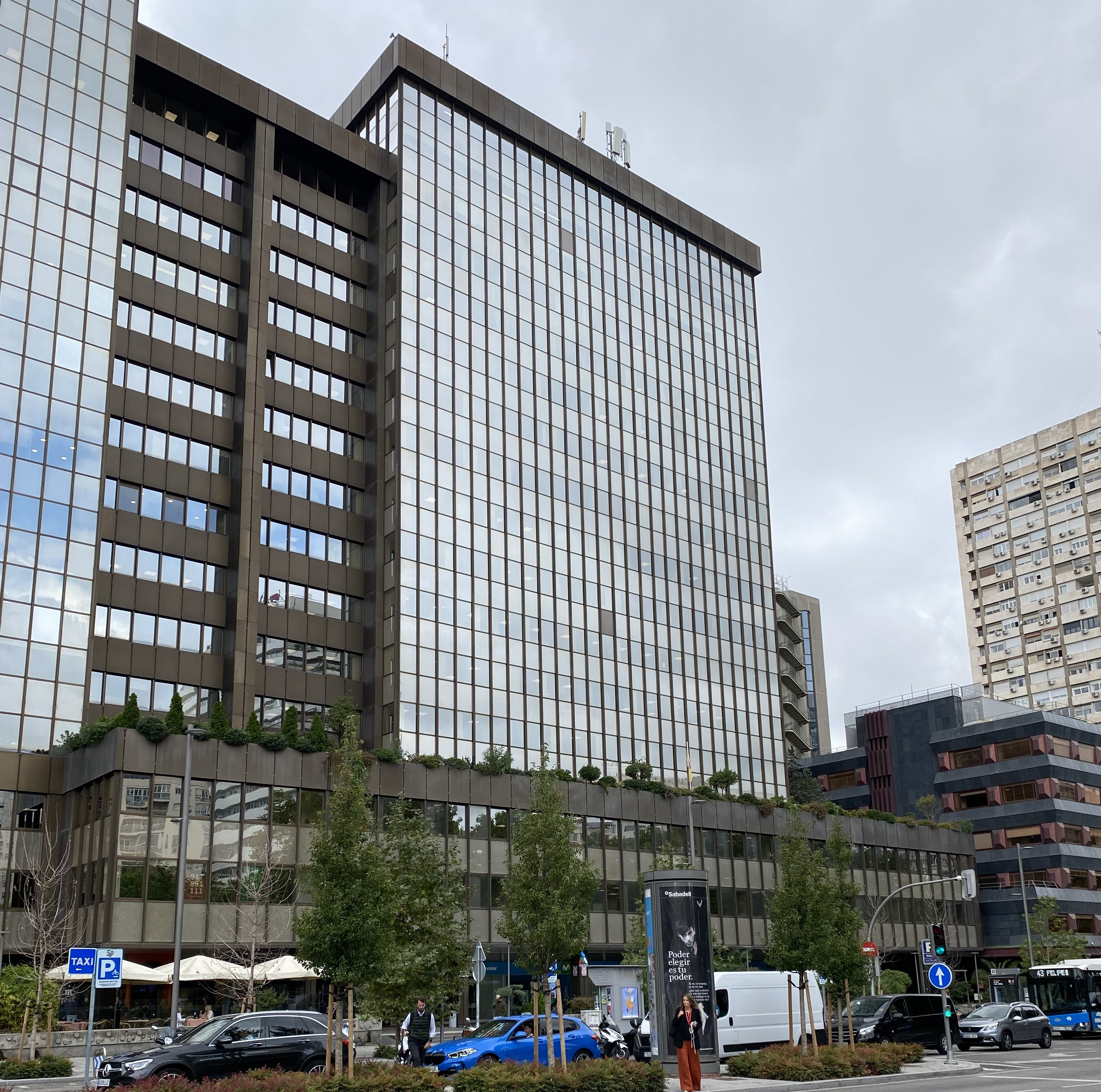
- Masters 2 Building in the AZCA development of Madrid, head office of the FROB

Agency overview
- Formed: June 27, 2009; 17 years ago
- Jurisdiction: Spain
- Headquarters: Avda. General Perón, 38; Madrid, Spain
- Agency executive: Chair, Álvaro López Barceló
- Parent agency: Ministry of Economy, Trade and Enterprise
- Website: www.frob.es

FROB – Executive Resolution Authority (formerly known as Fund for Orderly Bank Restructuring) is an entity of the Spanish government that manages the resolution processes of credit institutions and investment firms in their executive phase in Spain.

FROB is Spain's designated National Resolution Authority and plenary session member of the Single Resolution Board (SRB).

== Overview ==
FROB was created in 2009 as a direct response to the 2008 financial crisis. Initially, its aim was to increase the strength and solvency of the Spanish banking system by means of two essential functions at that time: managing the restructuring processes of credit institutions and helping to strengthen their own funds. Since the approval of Law 12/2015, it has been the Spanish National Resolution Authority within the European Single Resolution Mechanism (SRM), financed exclusively with private contributions from banks.

Law 11/2015 set up a new institutional framework to comply with the principles set out in Resolution Directive 2014/59/EU to separate supervisory and resolution functions and led to a transformation in the organisational structure, governance and functions of FROB.

From an operational perspective, in this new stage, FROB continues to be responsible for completion of the restructuring process in progress, which nowadays basically includes monitoring the holdings in BFA-Bankia and Sareb, as well as the guarantees granted in previous sale processes. This activity coexists with its role as resolution authority, cooperating with other Spanish preventive authorities (Bank of Spain and the National Securities Market Commission, CNMV) within Spain's institutional framework and under the SRM at euro-area level.

== See also ==
- List of financial supervisory authorities by country
