= 2008–2014 Spanish real estate crisis =

Real estate bubble

Spain experienced a real estate crisis from 2008 to 2014 in connection with the Great Recession. The number of sold units declined, housing prices sharply fell (more or less pronounced depending on the region) and the number of developers and construction companies declared bankrupt or in financial difficulties increased. Spain, however, is not the only country affected. The crisis has spread to other areas, leading to the 2008–2014 Spanish financial crisis.

== Background ==
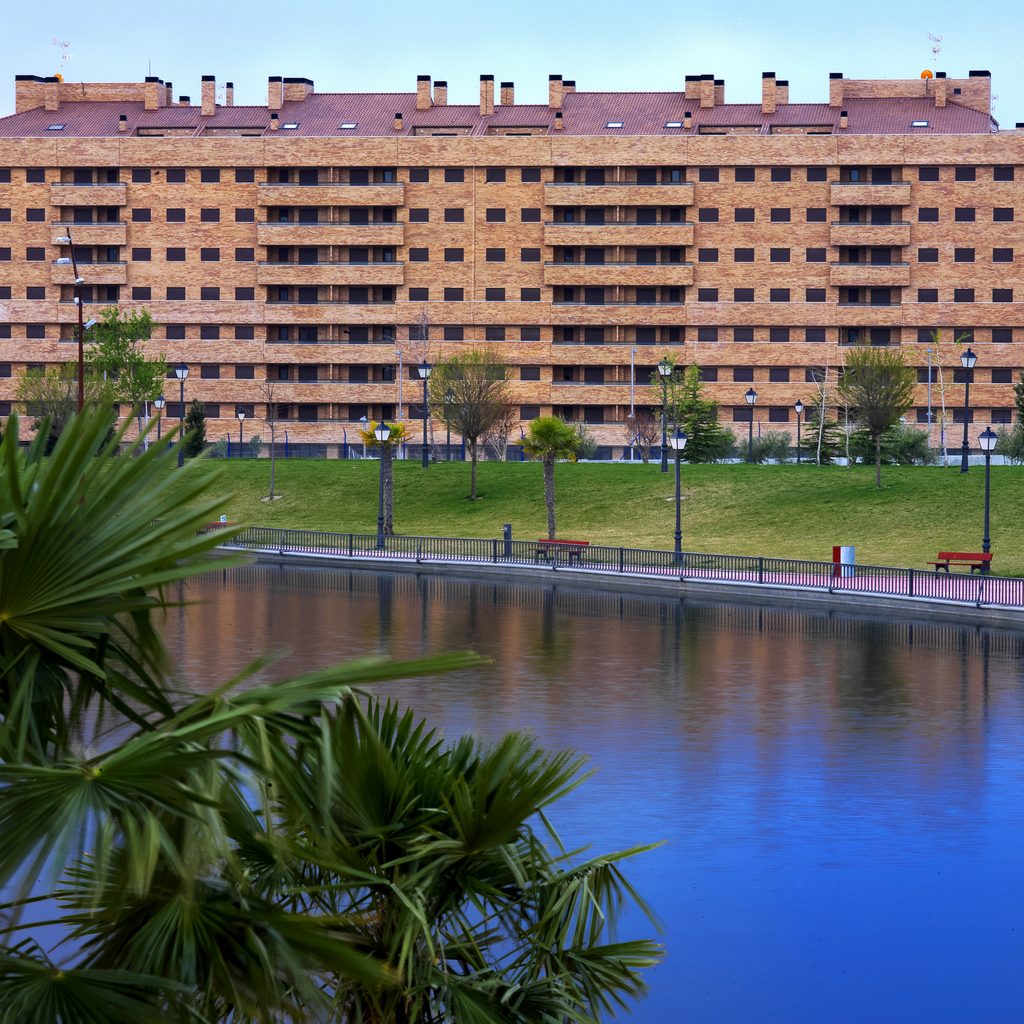
Urbanization of Seseña, in the province of Toledo. The construction of macro-urbanizations caused the housing stock to grow disproportionately. In 2013 it was proposed that many of the houses that could not be sold would be destroyed.

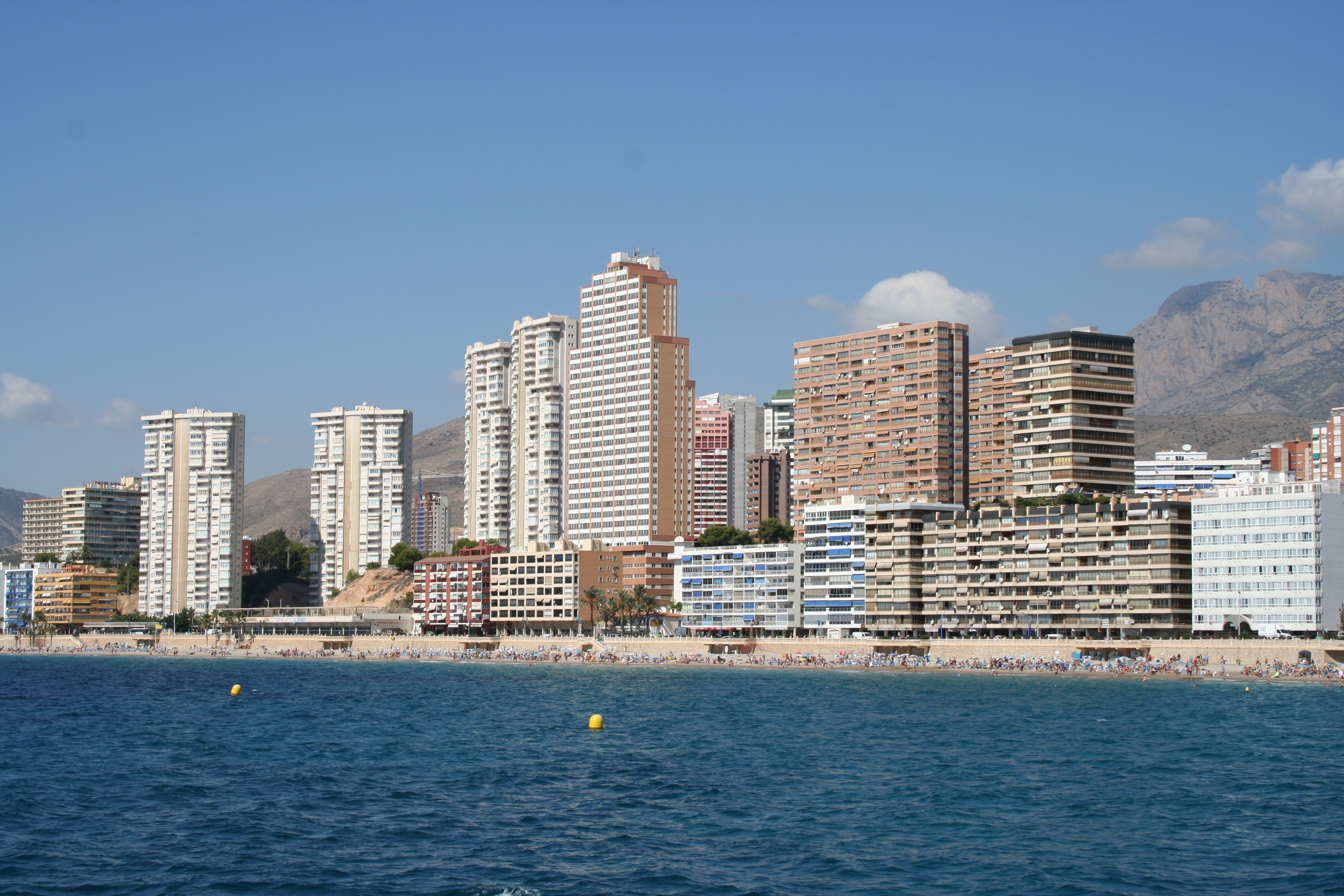
The growth of coastal urbanization has been spectacular, and in many cases has not respected the environment and the coast. In the photo Benidorm, in the province of Alicante.

Since about 1985 the Spanish construction industry had experienced a remarkable expansion. It was not only a classic economic bubble; it was part of the so-called global real-estate bubble, with the particularity that, in Spain, it became its structural economic locomotive. According to some authors, the biased economic information would have generated unrealistic expectations of revaluation, price increases and oversupply. The price increase would have been a phenomenon common to all industrialized countries, although with regional variations, and would have been parallel to the expansion of credit.

The Spanish phenomenon would have been characterized by a notable increase in housing starts and an unprecedented growth in hypothec debt, as well as an increase in the importance of construction in GDP and an increase in employment in the sector. On the other hand, there was an increase in housing prices well above the CPI.

== Beginnings of the crisis 2006, 2007 and 2008 ==
Main article: Subprime mortgage crisis

In autumn 2006, there was an inflexion in the advance of mortgage credit and prices began to fall (cf. Inversión magazine's front page with a categorical "Yes, they are falling"). The accelerators of the crisis seem to have been several. Among the conjunctural factors seems to be the mortgage crisis that began in August 2007 in the United States, resulting in a credit contraction, and the continuous increase in the Euribor since the ECB. This caused an increase in mortgage payments, 98% of which represented variable interest rates in Spain, a fact that could have had an impact on consumption and, in any case, on consumer confidence. On the other hand, the restriction of the credit market would have left construction companies without financing, with numerous works in progress, unable to find a credit source due to the stricter refinancing conditions, thus aggravating the situation in a sector with a high degree of leverage.

Among the structural factors are speculation, the mismatch between supply and demand, unable to meet the high prices of real estate, as well as the lack of flexibility of the real estate market, with difficulties in adapting quickly to market changes (since up to two years can pass between the start of a project and its sale), according to some.

The real estate businessman, Eduardo Molet, considers that the beginning of the real estate crisis in Spain was on June 30, 2006, coinciding with a letter that the Bank of Spain sent to all the banks threatening drastic measures if they continued giving mortgages as they had been doing until then.

=== Development ===
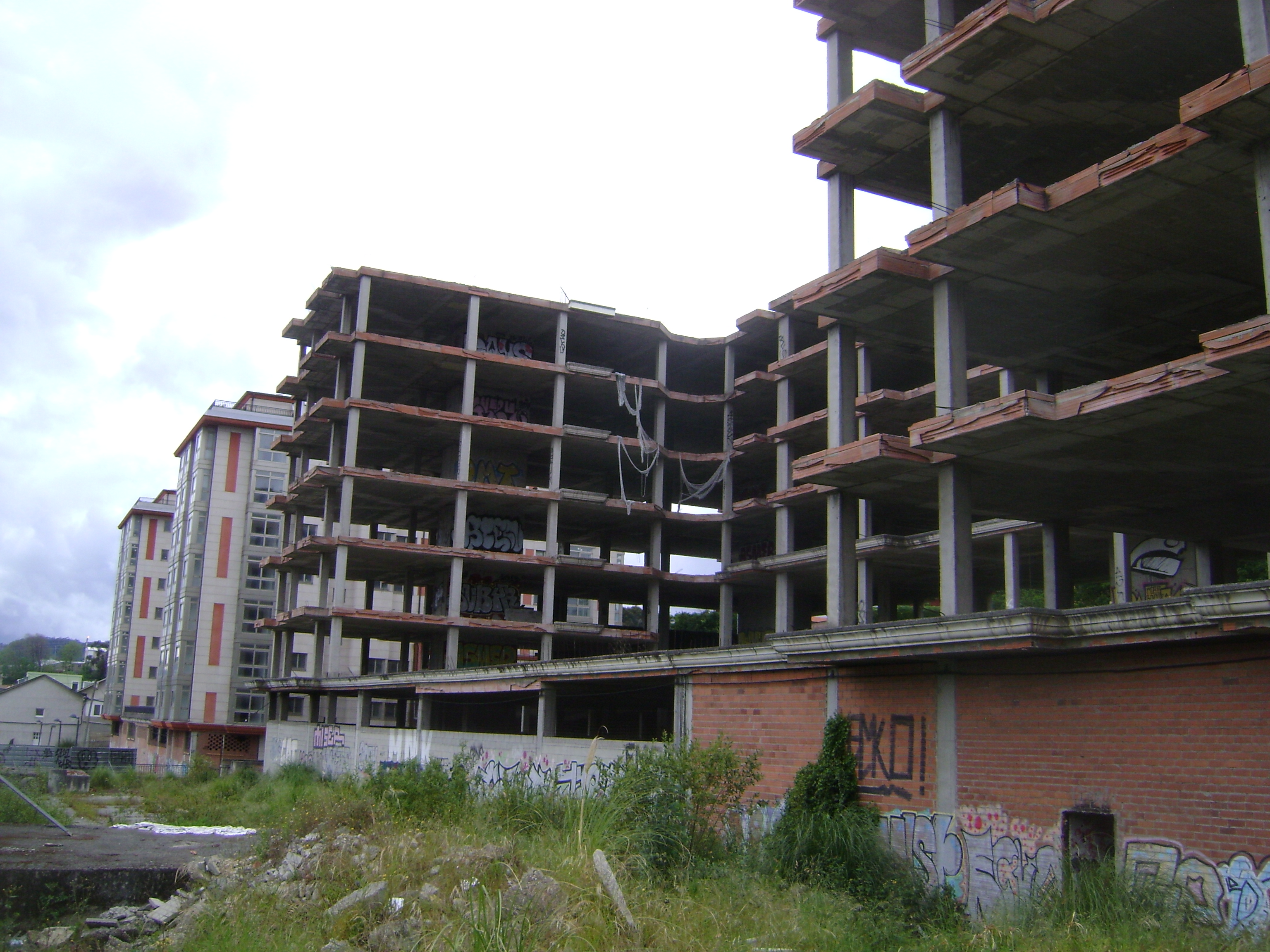
Unfinished buildings due to the crisis in La Coruña.

At the end of 2007, the news from the Spanish real estate sector began to describe the symptoms of what could be a crisis: a drop in building permits, pre-sales, sales and mortgages.

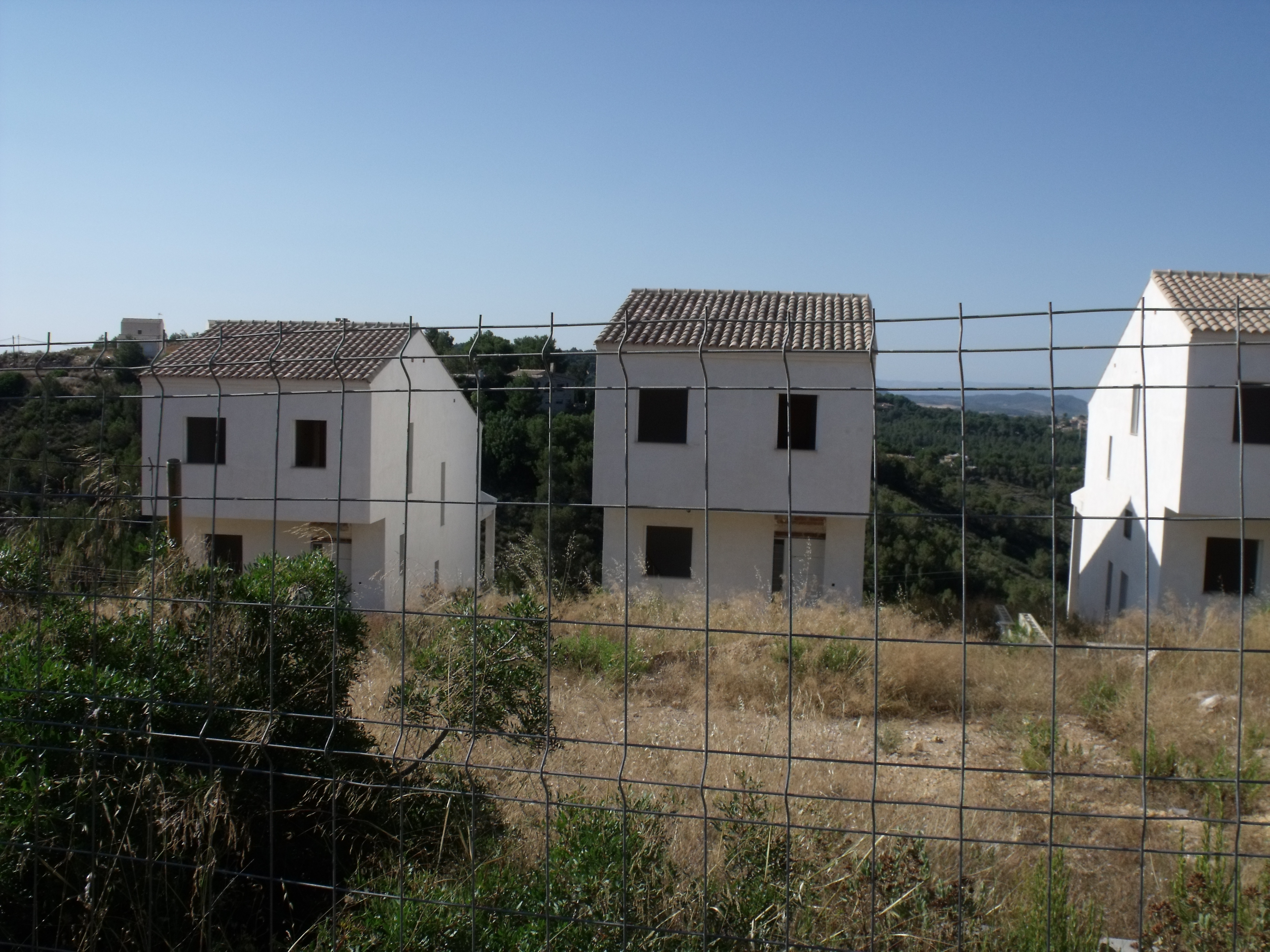
Unfinished second homes, near Valencia. Many projects were abandoned due to the impossibility of financing or selling them.

In the first quarter of 2008, the main construction companies saw a 72% reduction in their sales, with a revenue of 20 million euros, compared to 500 million euros in the same period of 2007. Since the beginning of 2008, the leading mass media had been predicting a serious crisis in the construction sector, with the sector's own employers' association predicting price reductions of around 8%. For its part, the land purchase and sale sector experienced a sharp contraction during the first four months of 2008, with a drop in sales of close to 100%. Specifically, there was a real estate market "slump" due to the 2008 financial crisis.

On May 15, the Don Piso Real Estate Network, one of the largest real estate companies in the heat of the real estate boom, with 400 own or franchised offices, closed all its offices and dismissed 100% of its staff after registering a 66% drop in sales.

As a culmination of the crisis, the country's leading real estate company (Martinsa-Fadesa) declares bankruptcy on July 14, leading to the largest suspension of payments in the economic history of Spain. The group's debt is estimated at more than 7,000 million euros. The two financial institutions with more exposure to the suspension of payments of Martinsa-Fadesa were Caja Madrid, with 900 million euros and Banco Popular with 400 million euros.

During 2009, the slump in sales and prices continued to worsen, which is now openly acknowledged by all those involved as a strong adjustment of the construction market.

The real estate crisis, in any case, took place during the Great Recession and the 2008–2014 Spanish financial crisis.

=== First actions ===
As a way of encouraging renting, the Spanish government provided a series of direct rental subsidies, effective since January 2008, and has accelerated tenders to reactivate the sector through public works. Although it has been suggested by the banks and the construction industry that the government should act directly on the sector to rescue it, going so far as to call for the use of the Social Security reserve and the Pension Fund (since the 2008 financial crisis and the real estate crisis appear to be intertwined), the government, through its Minister of Economy, rejected the idea, stating that "the adjustment [of the construction industry] should not be artificially prevented". Likewise, it has been suggested that free housing should be converted into subsidized housing.

=== Initial consequences ===
Among the main consequences are an increase in unemployment and the consequent contraction of consumption. Likewise, the construction sector suffers, closing up to half of the real estate agencies and leading to the bankruptcy of a large number of construction companies, also causing enormous difficulties for the real estate consortiums.

From the financial and banking point of view, the Spanish real estate collapse compromised the stability of financial institutions, causing mergers to guarantee the survival of some of them, forcing others to block the repayment of the investments of certain real estate funds and even turning banks and savings banks into improvised real estate agencies.

The first Spanish financial institution in serious difficulties due to the real estate crisis was Caja Castilla-La Mancha, which was intervened by the Bank of Spain on Sunday, March 29, 2009, with its entire management being dismissed and the bank's deposits being covered by the Deposit Guarantee Fund to cover the lack of liquidity.

== Real estate crisis from 2009 to 2014 ==
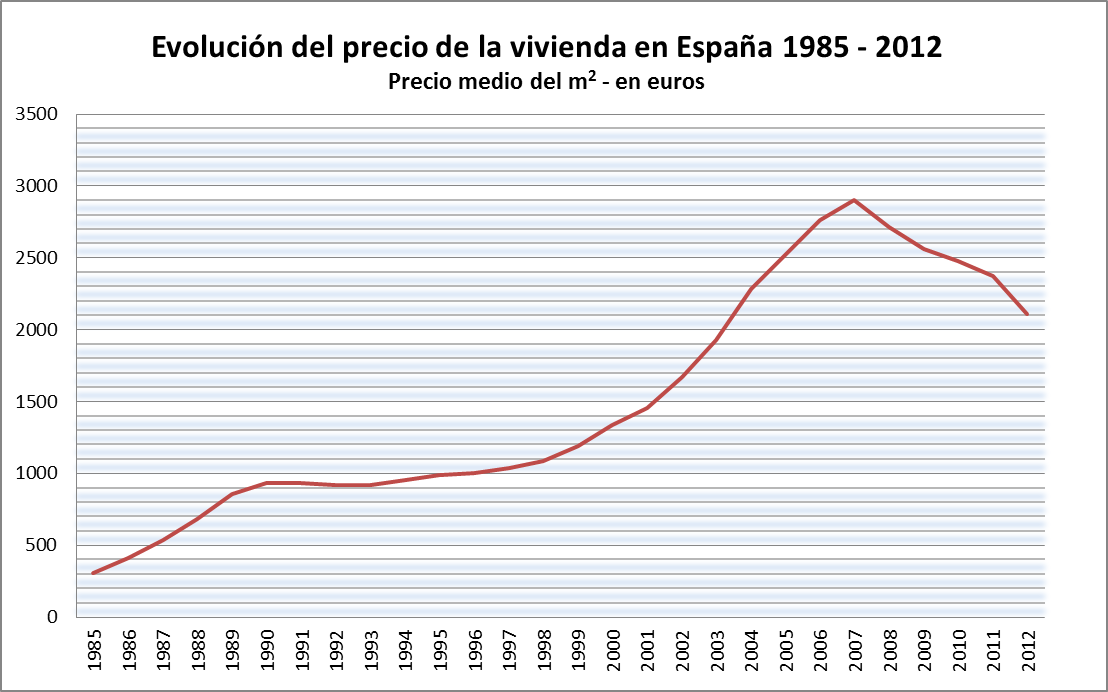
Evolution of housing prices in Spain 1985–2012. The real estate bubble in Spain started in 2001 and lasted until 2007 when housing reached its price peak, then the Spanish real estate crisis exploded, causing an economic, social and institutional crisis in Spain.

=== Price adjustment and balance sheets ===
Since 2007, the peak of the bubble, prices have continued to fall. During 2009, according to the Bank of Spain, they fell by 12% compared to 2007. The number of sales transactions also continued to plummet.

Some authors requested the creation of a bad bank, as Germany has done, which should be taken over by the State. "It is the Swedish model. The real estate bubble would burst. The prices of the apartments would fall as they would adjust to real demand and bank balance sheets could be cleaned up". The problem is that it would increase the state deficit, although the 99 billion planned for the Fund for Orderly Bank Restructuring (FROB) could be used.

The provisions required by the Bank of Spain, that after two years of non-payment of unfinished housing or land, 100% of the credit must be provided, may not be realistic since "Land in the center of cities is always worth money. This rule makes no sense," says Juan Ramón Quintás, president of the Spanish Confederation of Savings Banks. However, the Bank of Spain knows that it cannot relax too much because it would be accused of laxity, but neither can it tighten up too much, because too many institutions could fall. That was the dilemma in the first quarter of 2010.

Additionally, the increase in supply has caused a decline in the price of rental apartments, for 23 months in a row according to statistics from February 2010, which put additional pressure on the price of buying and selling.

In the first quarter of 2014, according to the Sociedad de Tasación (Valuation Society), housing was expected to fall by 5% in the face of meager sales.

=== Evictions and changes in the mortgage law: dation in payment ===
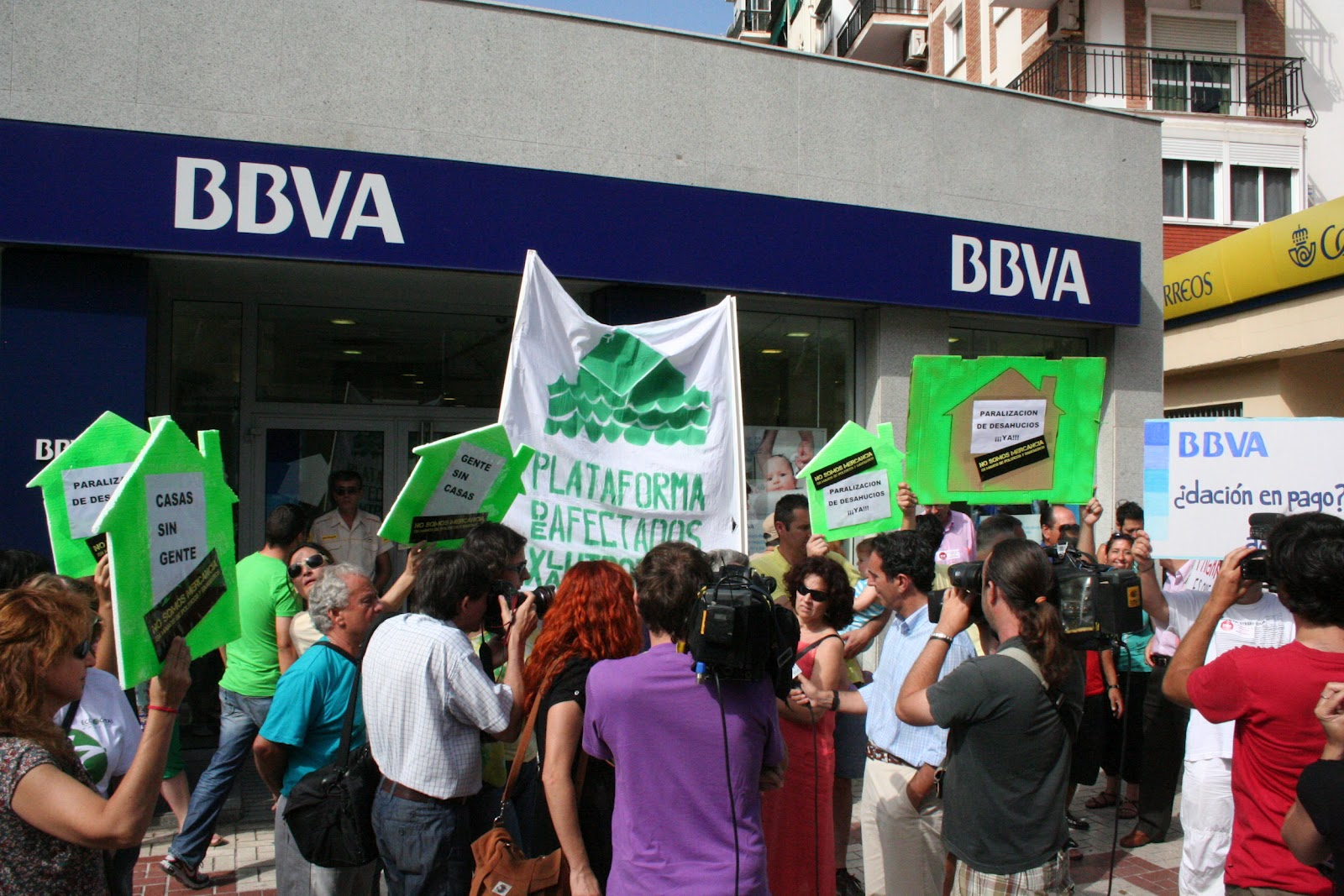
The number of people affected by mortgages they cannot pay led to the emergence in Spain of groups opposed to evictions. The tragedy that evictions meant for many families led the government to paralyze them in 2012.

One of the most serious problems, derived from the real estate crisis, is the number of evictions (some 178,000 foreclosures during the three-year period 2007–2009, compared to 47,379 in the previous three-year period). Cinco Días estimates that another 180,000 foreclosures were expected to be added in 2010. The CGPJ points out that the figures are misleading, since the same request may involve the auction of several properties, so that "the increase detected may be even more alarming".

The problem, originated in the Spanish mortgage law, is that the owner evicted for non-payment sees how his home is auctioned, sold and must continue to pay the mortgage on the home he does not own. In 90% of the cases, the real estate agencies of the creditor banks participate in the auctions and end up being awarded the homes at a bargain price. The mortgage law allows them to acquire the property for 50% of the price of the public auction if it is deserted, but they still have to pay the bank the outstanding mortgage.

The Platform of People Affected by the Mortgage (in Spanish: Plataforma de Afectados por la Hipoteca, PAH) indicates that the legal reality "abusive and coercive is framed in a situation of permanent assistance from the State to the banking sector" and that, in case of non-payment, the recovery of the mortgaged property by the bank "automatically entails the cancellation of all debt", as happens in other European countries and in the United States, where, if you cannot pay, you give up the property and the debt is cancelled. This is called "dation in payment".

In the first quarter of 2011, 15,491 evictions were carried out in Spain.

=== Measures to boost the Spanish Real Estate Sector in 2010 and 2011 ===
The measures adopted so far by the Spanish Government have not been able to tackle the Spanish real estate crisis of 2008. The suppression of the Ministry of Housing was related to this failure and at the beginning of 2010 the Ministry of Development proposed to accompany the sector in its gradual normalization, creating a Working Commission for the promotion of the Real Estate Sector. The government agreed to lower the VAT for new homes in order to help the banks to bring to the market the immense stock of homes owned by developers and builders, but it is not effective. Some communities introduce the deduction for the purchase of new homes in the personal income tax return in the regional brackets in order to help banks, developers and builders in the face of the immense stock that remains empty.

=== Negative perspectives ===
Population and occupational variables have a radical impact on the demand for housing. The decrease in the number of inhabitants (due to the decrease in immigration, the increase in emigration and the fall in the birth rate) significantly reduces the demand for housing. The increase in unemployment cancels out the expectations of emancipation or change of housing of the young or mature generations. The real estate market suffers from the loss of these traditional clients.

==== Drastic decrease in the Spanish population ====
In October 2011 the INE published data on the decrease of the Spanish population by 27 771 inhabitants from January to July 2011. It also made public the data on the population projection for Spain for the next decade, which predicts, if the demographic trend continues, a decrease of 1.2% of the population until 2021, i.e. a decrease of more than 500,000 inhabitants, leaving 45.6 million inhabitants at that date.

For José Luis Jimeno, real estate expert and president of the real estate consultancy Noteges, the boom will never come back and one of its main causes is the demographic factor: "The Spanish baby boomers went en masse to the military, then to university and then to buy a house", but this situation would have ended years ago, and the birth rate in Spain has stagnated. In addition to Jimeno's opinion, immigration has also stagnated and there is even a new emigration in search of work.

==== Unemployment cases gradually rise in Spain ====
The strong growth of unemployment in Spain has had a clear impact on the demand for housing. According to the Labour Force Survey for the first quarter of 2011, the number of unemployed people in the country was 4,833,700, with an unemployment rate of 20.89%. Since 2009, Spain has had the highest unemployment rate in the first world (see List of countries by unemployment rate). The youth unemployment rate in Spain is 43.61%.

=== Spanish mortgage crisis of 2012 ===
==== Evictions ====
The mortgage crisis worsened in 2012, both because of the deterioration of Spanish financial institutions and because of the increase in the number of evictions and the dramatic number of suicides caused by evictions.

==== Bank nationalizations and bailouts ====
The granting of high-risk loans has meant reforms, mergers, bailouts and numerous nationalizations of savings banks (Caja Castilla-La Mancha, CajaSur, Caja Mediterráneo (CAM, Novacaixagalicia, Caixa Catalunya, Unnim and Bankia).

==== Judgment of the European Court of Justice of November 8, 2012 ====
The Advocate General of the Court of Justice of the European Union Juliane Kokott, considers, in the opinion made public on Thursday, November 8, 2012, that the Spanish law regarding evictions violates the European Union Directive 93/13. The Spanish law would allow the introduction of clauses considered abusive in mortgage loan contracts established by banks and which, in case of non-compliance, would end in the forced execution of the eviction. This report is based on the lawsuit filed by Mohamed Aziz against the bank CatalunyaCaixa after he was forcibly evicted from his home in 2011.

==== Criticism and mortgage law reform in 2012 ====
The economic crisis in Spain and the increase in the number of evictions - 400,000 from 2007 to 2012 - along with a series of suicides has led the General Council of the Judiciary to urge reform. Also the 46 dean judges are calling for the modification of the rule to avoid the abuse of evictions and corruption. Faced with the suicide of Amaia Egaña on November 9, 2012, the dean judge of Baracaldo, Juan Carlos Mediavilla, urged to undertake changes in the legislation surrounding evictions to avoid new "tragedies".

Rafael Correa, President of Ecuador, during his visit to Spain in March 2012, criticized Spain's mortgage law stating that it disrespected human rights and showed the supremacy of capital over human beings. The group of Ecuadorians living in Spain is about 360,000 of which 15,000 have been affected by the Spanish mortgage crisis.

=== Spanish mortgage crisis in 2013 ===
Mortgage signings in Spain peaked in 2006, since when they have been falling steadily. In 2012, 274,715 loans were signed for the purchase of a home, the lowest level since the real estate bubble burst in 2007. The drop is 32.74% in 2012 compared to 2011. The outlook for 2013 remains gloomy in general, as a series of factors have an impact on the stagnation of the demand for housing: high unemployment (over 25%), difficulty in financing, foreseeable increase in interest rates, increase in housing taxes and the end of the housing tax credit, increase in renting, possible influence of the bad bank -Sareb-, population data -low birth rate and emigration-. Authors such as Borja Mateo indicate that stagnation will continue and prices will continue to fall for a few more years.

==== Judgment of the Court of Justice of the European Union of March 14, 2013 ====
On March 14, 2013, the Court of Justice of the European Union (CJEU) ruled that Spanish eviction laws do not guarantee citizens sufficient protection against abusive clauses in mortgages and therefore violate EU law, specifically Council Directive 93/13/EEC of April 5, 1993 on consumer protection. The judgment of the European Court of Luxembourg is issued in response to a question presented by the Commercial Court of Barcelona, specifically by Judge José María Fernández Seijo, at the request of the lawyer Dionisio Moreno, in view of the impossibility of paralyzing an eviction under Spanish law. According to the ruling, evictions can be stopped by the judge in compliance with the aforementioned community regulations.

==== Fall in the price of housing in 2013 ====
At the end of 2013 the price of housing would have accumulated a fall of 45% since the beginning of the crisis in 2007, considering also that the cost of housing would not have touched the ground. Spain was the country in the world where housing prices fell the most. In the third quarter of 2013 the value of apartments in Spain fell by 9.46% compared to the third quarter of 2012.

=== Spanish mortgage crisis of 2014 ===
==== Judgment of the Court of Justice of the European Union ====
The Court of Justice of the European Union in a ruling on Thursday, July 17, 2014, declared that the mortgage law reform approved by the People's Party in 2013 violates human rights. The judgment indicates that the law is contrary to Article 47 of the Charter of Fundamental Rights of the European Union, relating to the right to effective judicial protection, and specifically to Directive 93/13 on consumer matters, and states that not suspending mortgage proceedings in the event of a claim before the commercial court is contrary to Community law.

==== Fall in house prices in 2014 ====
In June 2014, the price of housing would have accumulated a fall of 6.6% compared to June 2013. The signing of mortgages in March recorded a fall in 2014 of 32.4%, which adds up to 45 months of falls. According to the General Council of Notaries, the number of homes sold, with ups and downs, remains at average figures similar to previous months.

== See also ==
- 2008 financial crisis
- Fondo de Garantía de Depósitos
- Real-estate bubble
- List of banks in Spain
