= Caixa Rural Galega =

Cooperative bank in Galicia, Spain

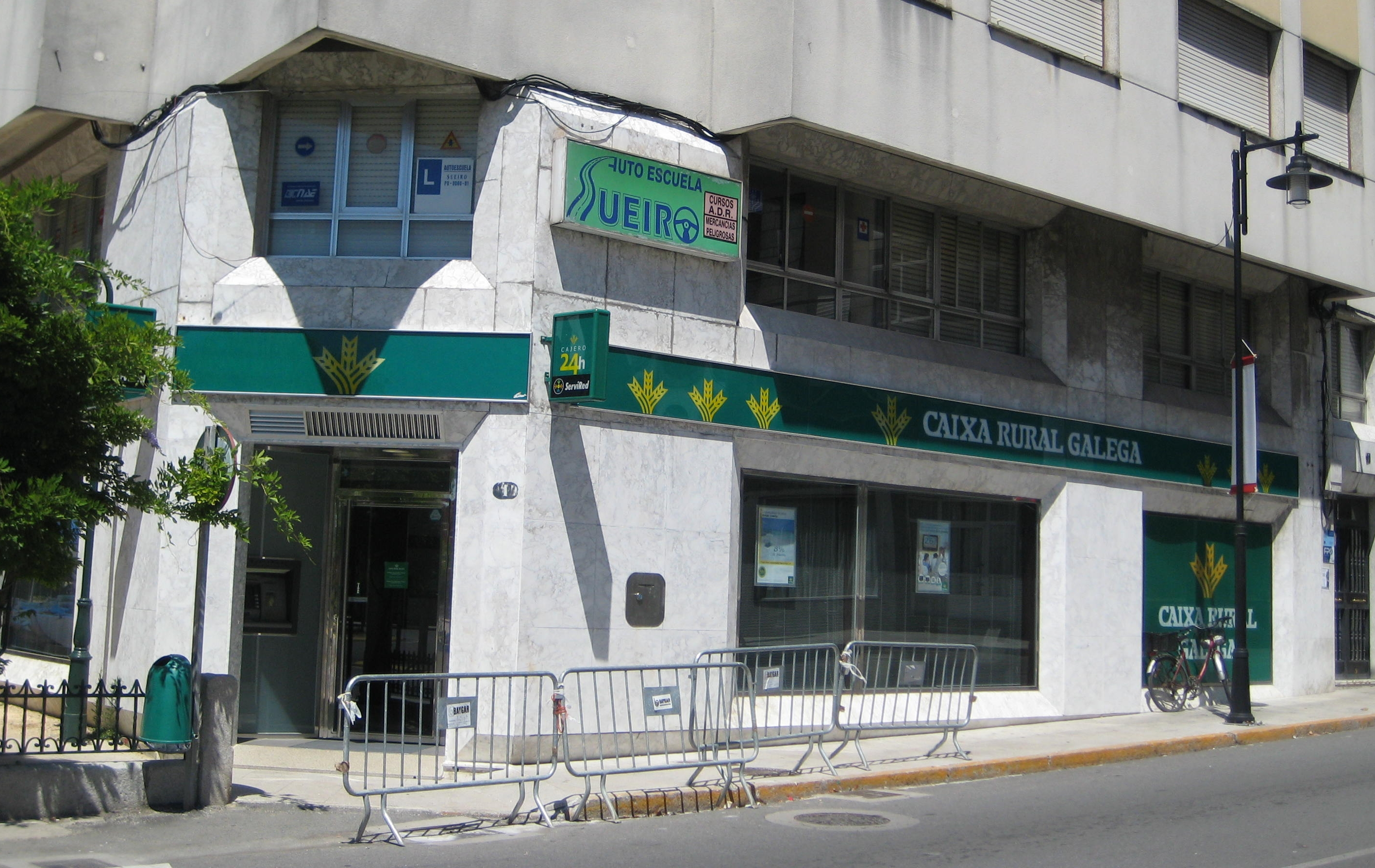
- Branch in Cambados
- Company type: Cooperative bank
- Industry: Financial services
- Predecessor: Caixa Rural Provincial de Lugo
- Founded: Lugo, Galiza (1966)
- Headquarters: Lugo, Galiza, Spain
- Services: Retail banking, Insurances
- Website: caixaruralgalega.gal

Caixa Rural Galega, Sociedad Cooperativa de Crédito Limitada Gallega is a Galician cooperative bank founded in 1966 in Lugo, where it keeps its headquarters. It is owned by about 15.000 members (2016) and is considered the only Galician financial institution that is wholly locally owned since all other banks and savings banks were sold or merged in the last decade: Caixa Galicia, Caixanova and Banco Etcheverría (now Abanca), Banco Pastor (sold first to Banco Popular and then to Banco Santander) or Banco Gallego (now Sabadell).

In total, it has 46 branches with 33 in the Province of Lugo, 6 in the Province of Ourense, 3 in the Province of A Coruña and 4 in the Province of Pontevedra. It made a 3 million profit in 2016, like in pre-crisis values.

It is part of Grupo Caja Rural, which includes the Banco Cooperativo Español (banking holding), the Rural Grupo Asegurador (insurance company), the Gescooperativo (investment fund management) and the Rural Servicios Informáticos (software development company). It's a large group of cooperative banks along Spain and allows its members to offer all types of financial and insurance products and deal with technological services like home banking or mobile payments.

== See also ==
- List of banks in Spain
