= Caja de Ahorros del Mediterráneo =

Spanish savings bank

- Trade name: Caja Mediterráneo
- Native name: Caja de Ahorros del Mediterráneo
- Type: Savings bank
- Industry: Financial services
- Founded: Alicante, Spain (March 23, 1992)
- Defunct: December 2011
- Fate: Acquired by Banco Sabadell, S.A.
- Successor: SabadellCAM
- Headquarters: Alicante, Spain
- Number of locations: 1,157 branches
- Key people: Modesto Crespo Martínez, Chairman (2009-2011), Roberto López Abad, CEO (2001-2010), Agustín Llorca Ramírez, Deputy General Manager (2011)
- Services: Retail banking; Commercial banking
- Net income: €3,703,344,000 (2007)
- Owner: Banco Sabadell, S.A.
- Number of employees: 7,171 (2007)

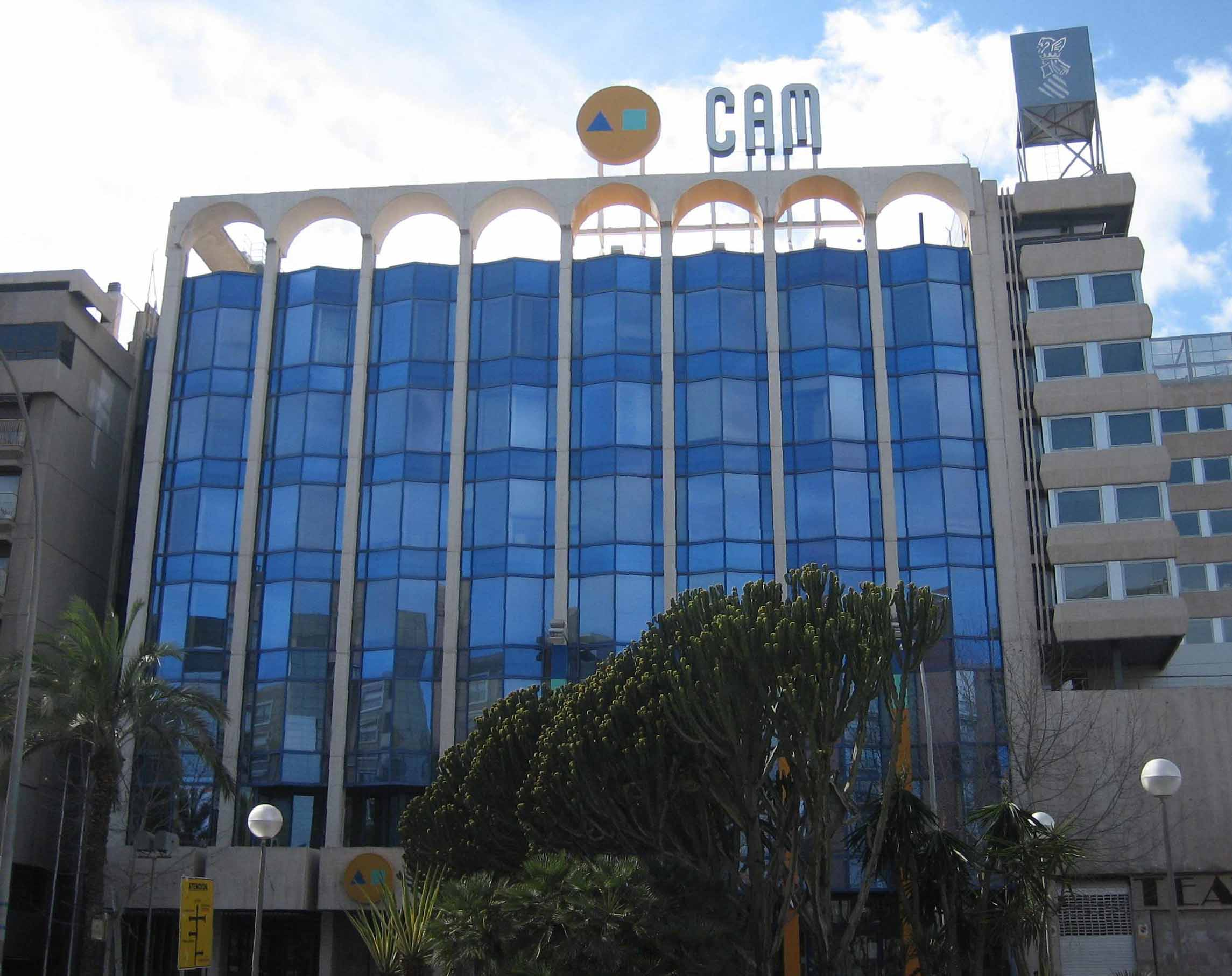
The CAM building in Alicante.

Caja de Ahorros del Mediterráneo (CAM; Mediterranean Savings Bank) was a Spanish savings bank in Alicante, Valencia.

The savings bank failed with the burst of the property bubble on Spain's Mediterranean coast. In the first nine months of 2011 it had lost €1.7 billion and the bad loans ratio had reached 20.8 per cent. In December 2011, it was sold to Banco Sabadell for one euro.

== History ==
CAM was the result of integration at different stages of 29 financial institutions, the oldest of which traces its origins to 1875. As of December 31, 2007, CAM was the fourth largest Spanish savings bank in terms of customer loans and deposits, and the 3rd largest in the market share and the number of offices.

Originating in the provinces of Alicante and Murcia, the bank provided services across Spain through a network of over 1,100 offices and 7,100 employees serving 3,300,000 customers. CAM activities were mainly focused on retail banking for individuals and SMEs. The bank also provided such financial services as insurance and asset management.

Like other Spanish savings banks, Caja Mediterráneo was a non-profit social institution. According to CAM, more than 5,100,000 people have benefited from its social commitment activities with a budget of 60.1 million euros for 2007.

In 2008, Caja Mediterráneo issued non-voting public shares traded on Madrid Stock Exchange. CAM was the first Spanish savings bank to issue public shares. In the initial public offering (IPO), CAM raised €292 million, which turned out to be the largest IPO of 2008 on Madrid Stock Exchange.

Luis de Guindos, boss of Lehman Brothers when "cuotas participativas" were sold, explained in 2008 that this product would be studied in Business Schools some years later. However, in December 2011 the stock price of this kind of non-voting public shares was suspended at a value of €1,34 and thousands of people lost all their savings. At the moment of the initial public offering (IPO), Francisco Galiano and José Pina Galiana were in the CAM team.

Caja de Ahorros del Mediterráneo adopted its current name in 1988, and has been using the trademark Caja Mediterráneo since 2007. It was previously known as Caja de Ahorros de Alicante y Murcia. The bank absorbed

- Caja de Ahorros de Torrent, founded in 1906, in 1988 and
- Caja de Ahorros Provincial de Alicante y Valencia in 1991.

In turn, the Caja de Ahorros de Alicante y Murcia was formed in 1975 through the merger of the following savings banks:

- Monte de Piedad y Caja de Ahorros de Alcoy, founded in 1875
- Caja de Ahorros de Nuestra Señora de los Dolores in Crevillent, founded in 1903
- Caja de Ahorros de Novelda founded in 1903
- Caja de Ahorros de Nuestra Señora de Monserrate in Orihuela, created in 1906 under the name Caja de Ahorros y Socorros y Monte de Piedad de Nuestra Señora de Monserrate
- Caja de Ahorros del Sureste de España, founded in 1940, as a merger of
  - Caja de Ahorro y Monte de Piedad de Alicante, founded in 1877,
  - Caja de Ahorro y Monte de Piedad de Murcia, founded in 1924
  - Caja de Ahorro y Monte de Piedad de Cartagena, founded in 1921
  - Caja de Ahorro y Monte de Piedad de Elche, founded in 1886
  - Caja de Ahorro y Monte de Piedad de Jumilla, founded in 1893
  - Caja de Ahorro y Monte de Piedad de Yecla, founded in 1902, and
  - Caja Rural de Ahorros y Préstamos del Sindicato Católico Agrícola de Yecla, founded in 1921, and
  - Caja Rural de Ahorros y Préstamos del Sindicato Católico Agrícola de El Progreso founded in 1919 in Caudete.

One year later, in 1976, the Caja de Ahorros de Alicante y Murcia absorbed the Caja de Ahorros de Alhama de Murcia, which had been founded in 1902.

Further, the Caja de Ahorros Provincial de Alicante y Valencia was created in 1990 by merging

- Caja de Ahorros Provincial de Alicante, founded in 1953, and
- Caja de Ahorros Provincial de Valencia, founded in 1983.

In the 1990s, CAM acquired the subsidiaries in Spain of the Italian bank Intesa Sanpaolo and the English Abbey National Bank.

== See also ==
- Spanish property bubble
- 2008–2014 Spanish real estate crisis
- List of banks in Spain
