= Pueyo =

Pueyo may refer to:

== People ==
- David Muñoz Pueyo (born 1997), Spanish football player
- Helena Pueyo (born 2001), Spanish basketball player
- Joaquim Pueyo (born 1950), French politician
- José Villanova Pueyo (1909-?), Spanish boxer
- María José Pueyo (born 1970), Spanish marathon runner
- Ricardo Pueyo (born 1967), Spanish racewalker
- Úrsula Pueyo (born 1983), Spanish skier

== Places ==
- El Pueyo de Araguás, Huesca, Aragon, Spain
- Pueyo de Santa Cruz de Santa Cruz, municipality located in the province of Huesca, Aragon, Spain
- Pueyo, Navarre, town located in the province and autonomous community of Navarre, northern Spain

== See also ==
- Banca Pueyo, a traditional Spanish bank
