= Banco Atlántico =

Spanish bank

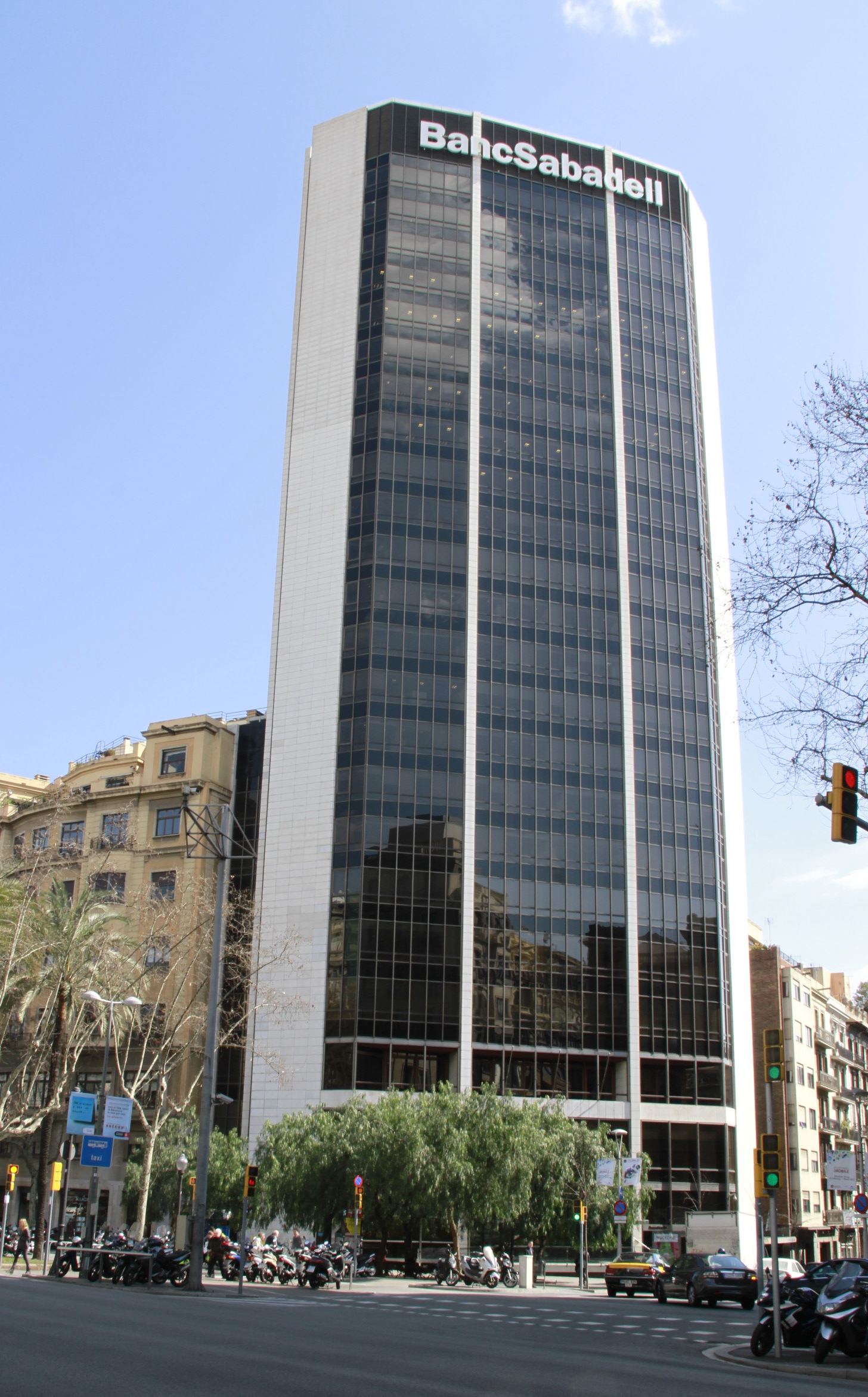
- Bank headquarters in Barcelona, later known as Torre Banc de Sabadell
- Company type: Private company
- Industry: Banking
- Founded: 1901
- Headquarters: Catalonia, Spain
- Products: Banking
- Revenue: ▲€ ? billion (2006)
- Operating income: ▲€ ? billion (2006)
- Net income: ▼€ ? billion (2006)
- Parent: Banco Sabadell

Banco Atlántico, S.A. was a bank in Barcelona. In 2003 Banco Atlántico became part of the Banco Sabadell Group.

== History ==
In 1901, shortly after Cuba gained independence from Spain, José and Francisco Nonell y Feliu, who had been operating a currency exchange business in Cuba since 1885, relocated their business to Barcelona. In collaboration with local merchants, they established a bank called Nonell, Rovira y Matas, which aimed to facilitate the investment of repatriated funds from Cuba into local securities.

By 1917, the bank had changed its name to Nonell Hermanos, and in the 1920s, it was further rebranded as Banca Nonell. In 1946, Claudio Güell y Churruca, the Count of Ruiseñada, took control of the bank and renamed it Banco Atlántico.

In 1961, the descendants of Güell sold their shares to a new group of investors. During this time, Continental Illinois Bank acquired a stake in Banco Atlántico. However, ownership eventually passed to Rumasa, a holding company owned by José María Ruiz Mateos.

In 1975, Banco Atlántico expanded its international presence by establishing an agency in New York, which remained operational until its closure in 2001.

In 1983, the Spanish Socialist government under Felipe González and Miguel Boyer nationalized Rumasa, including Banco Atlántico. At the time, Rumasa was a conglomerate of 20 banks and approximately 300 other companies, and its financial troubles were too large for the Corporación Bancaria to manage. By this point, Banco Atlántico had become the 10th largest bank in Spain, with 172 domestic branches, an agency in New York, a branch in Grand Cayman, two subsidiaries in Switzerland and Panama, and representative offices in eight countries.

In 1984, the Arab Banking Corporation (ABC), in partnership with BBVA and Allianz, acquired Banco Atlántico from the government. Following the acquisition, Banco Atlántico expanded its private banking operations by adding subsidiaries in the Bahamas, Gibraltar, and Monaco, while divesting its subsidiary in Switzerland. Eventually, Banco Exterior replaced BBVA and Allianz as shareholders.

In 1999, BBVA regained partial ownership of Banco Atlántico after acquiring Argentaria, a group of banks created by the Spanish government, including Banco Exterior.

In 2003, Banco Sabadell acquired and absorbed Banco Atlántico, outbidding several competitors, including Barclays Bank and Caixa Geral de Depositos of Portugal.

== See also ==
- List of banks in Spain
