= Renta 4 Banco =

Financial institution

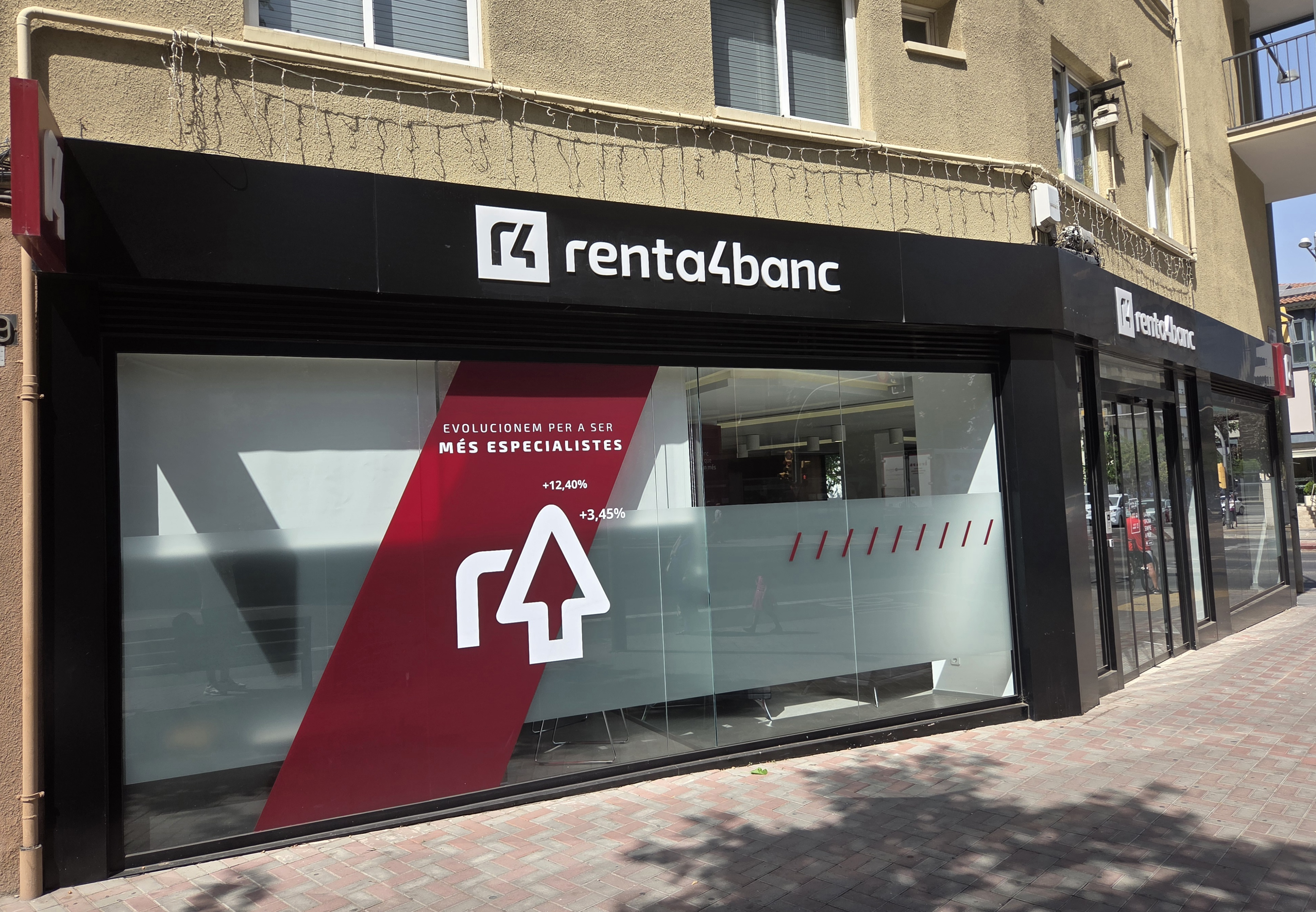
- Industry: Financial services
- Founded: 1986
- Headquarters: Paseo de la Habana 74, Madrid, Spain

Renta 4 Banco is a financial institution specializing in investment products and services and is the only investment services company listed on the Spanish stock exchange (Madrid, Barcelona, Bilbao and Valencia) and a member of the General Investment Guarantee Fund (FOGAIN).

Its head office is in Madrid, 57 offices are throughout Spain and international offices are in Chile, Colombia and Peru.

== See also ==
- List of banks in Spain
