= Caja Murcia =

Spanish foundation

Caja de Ahorros de Murcia
- Type: Cooperative
- Industry: Banking and Financial services
- Founded: 1964
- Headquarters: Murcia, Spain
- Number of locations: 448 branches
- Area served: Nationwide
- Number of employees: 2,105
- Website: www.cajamurcia.es

Caja de Ahorros de Murcia or Caja Murcia is a Spanish saving bank. It was founded on September 23, 1964.

Headquartered in Murcia, this is the first financial institution in the Region of Murcia.

== Branches ==
- Region of Murcia: 266
- Province of Alicante: 91
- Province of Valencia: 31
- Province of Almería: 28
- Province of Albacete: 23
- Madrid: 4
- Province of Cuenca: 3
- Province of Castellón: 2

== See also ==
- List of banks in Spain
