= List of banks in Spain =

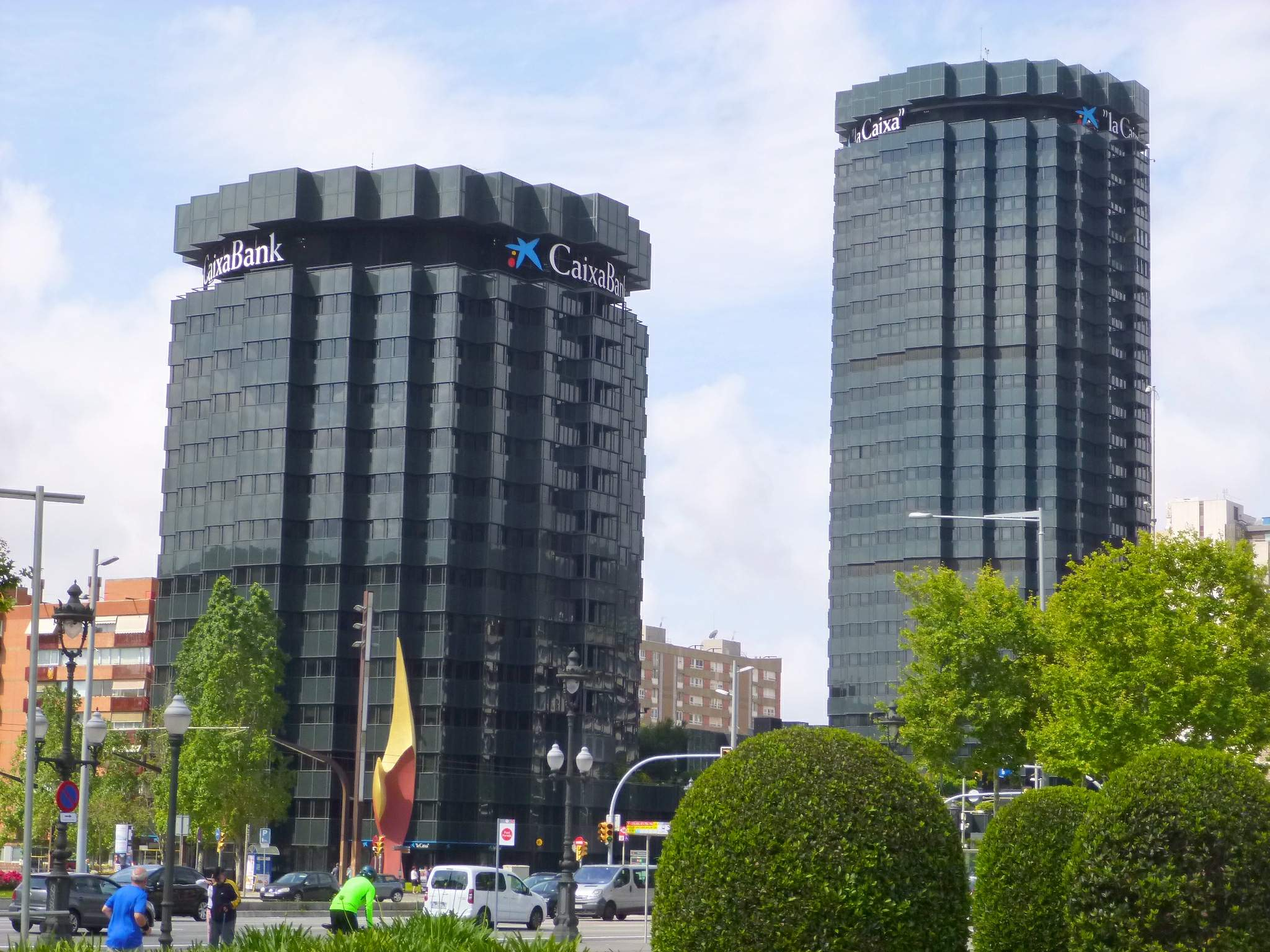
CaixaBank head office, Barcelona

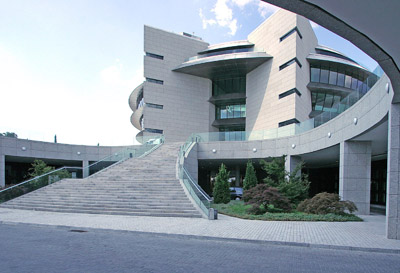
Santander Group headquarters complex near Madrid

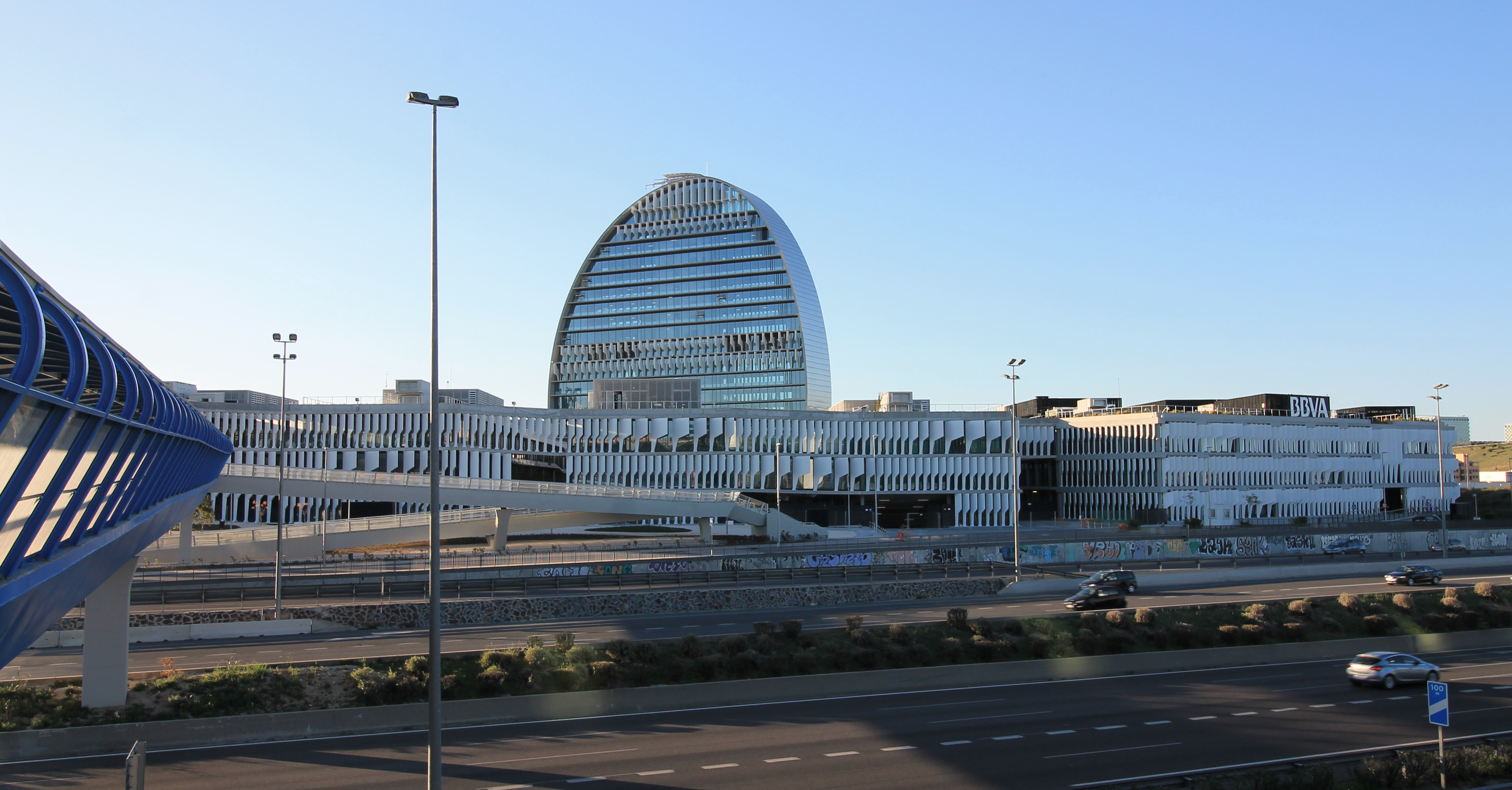
BBVA head office complex, Madrid

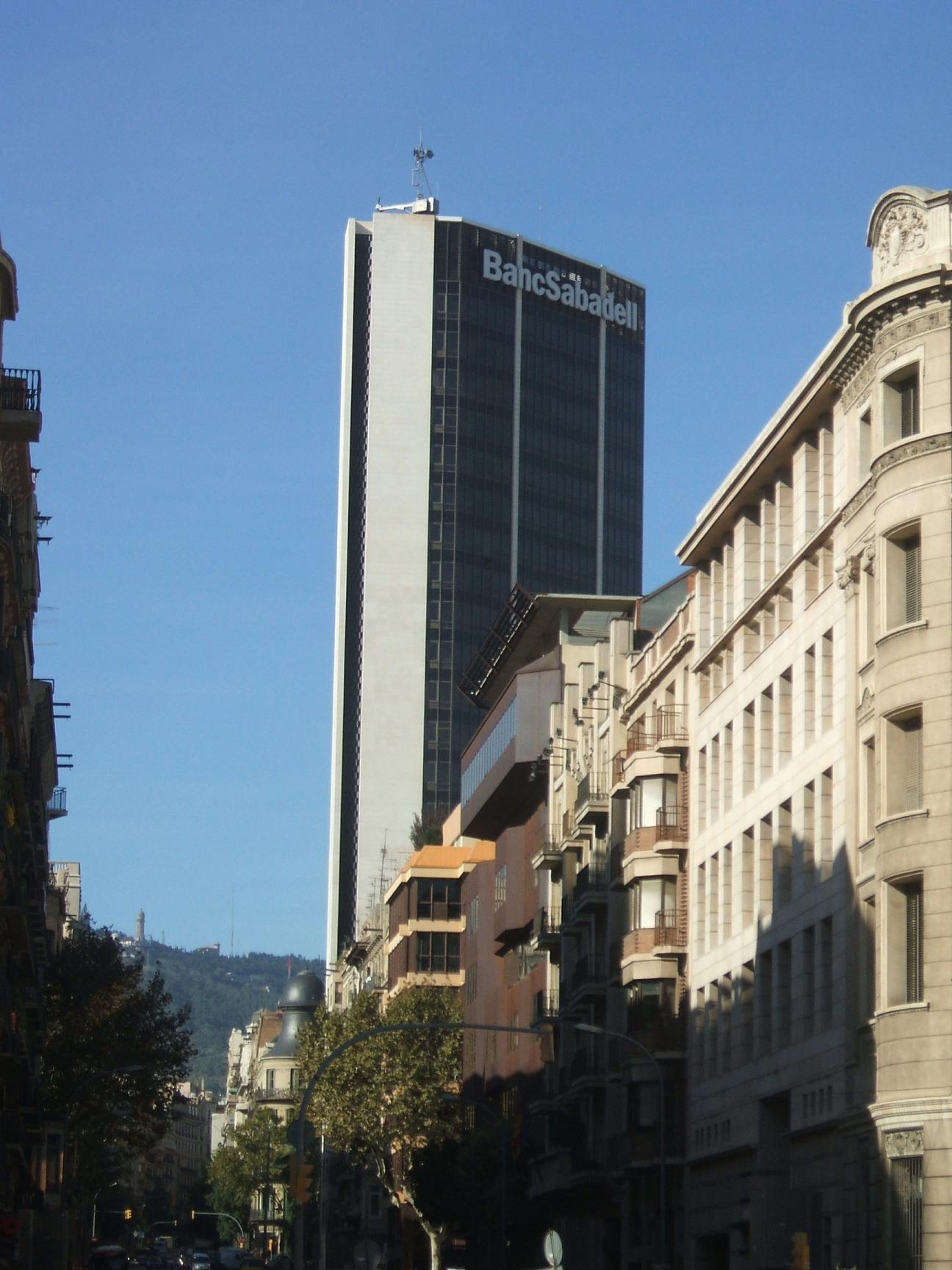
Banco Sabadell Tower, Barcelona

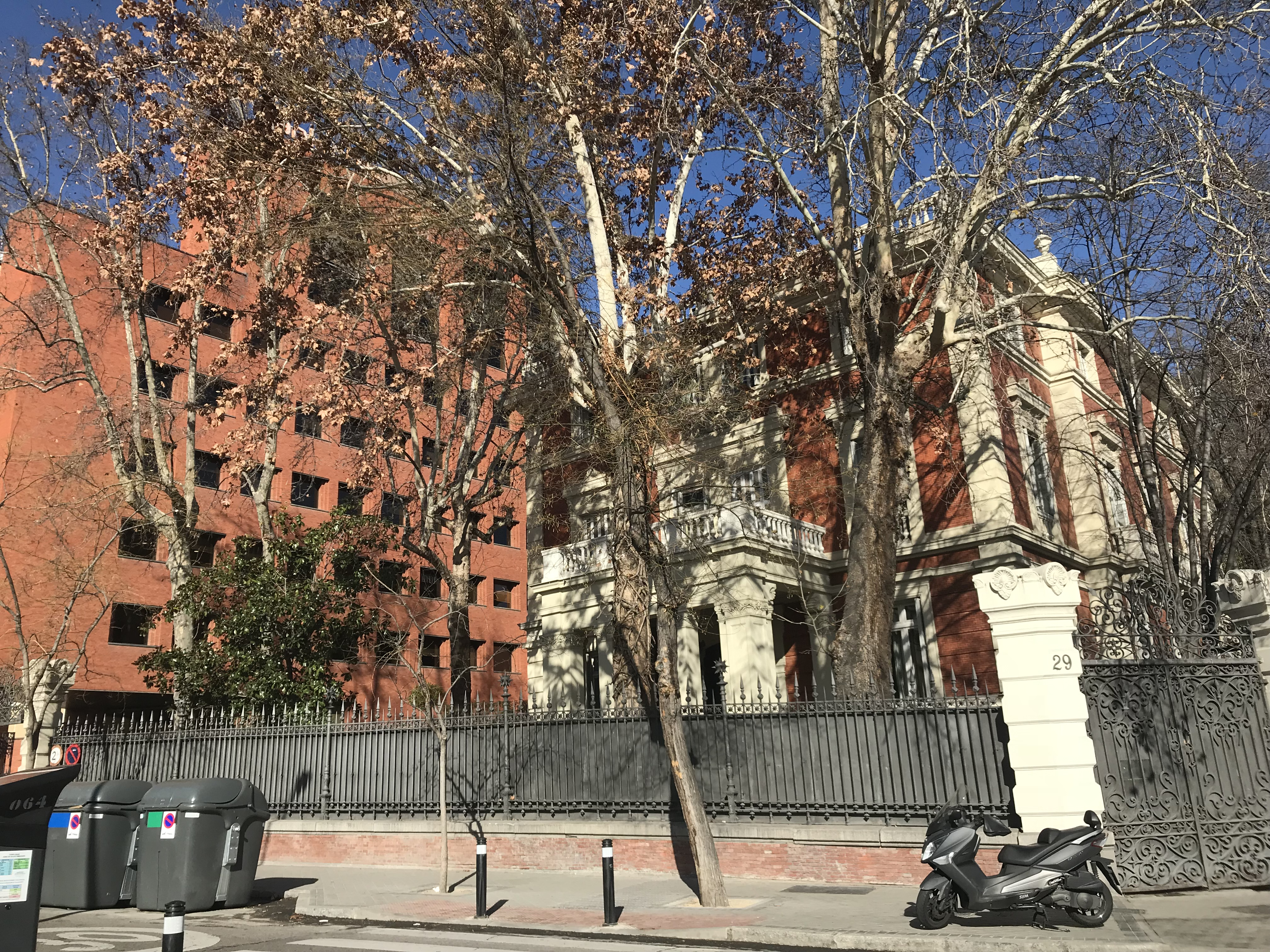
Bankinter head office, Madrid

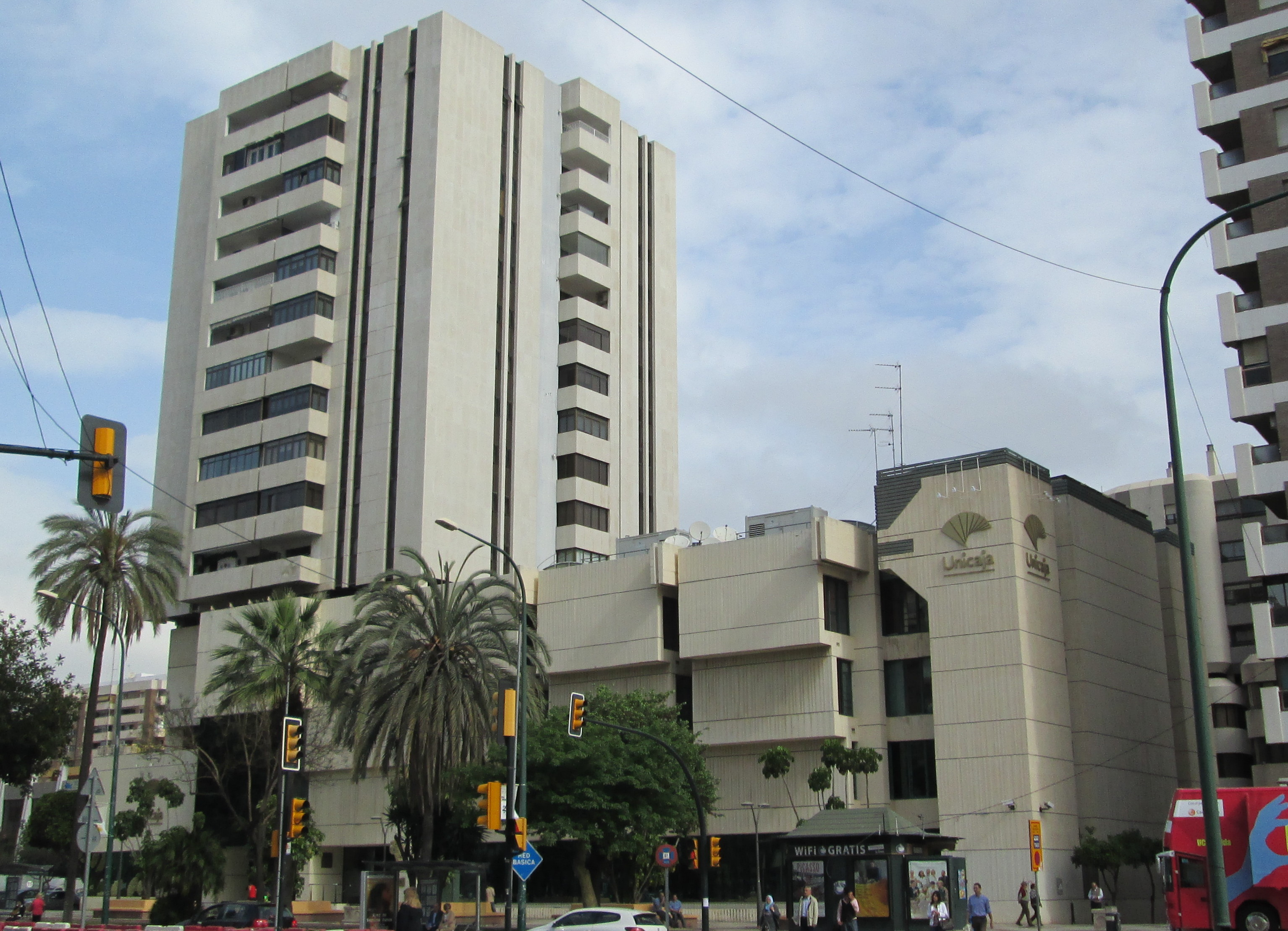
Unicaja head office, Málaga

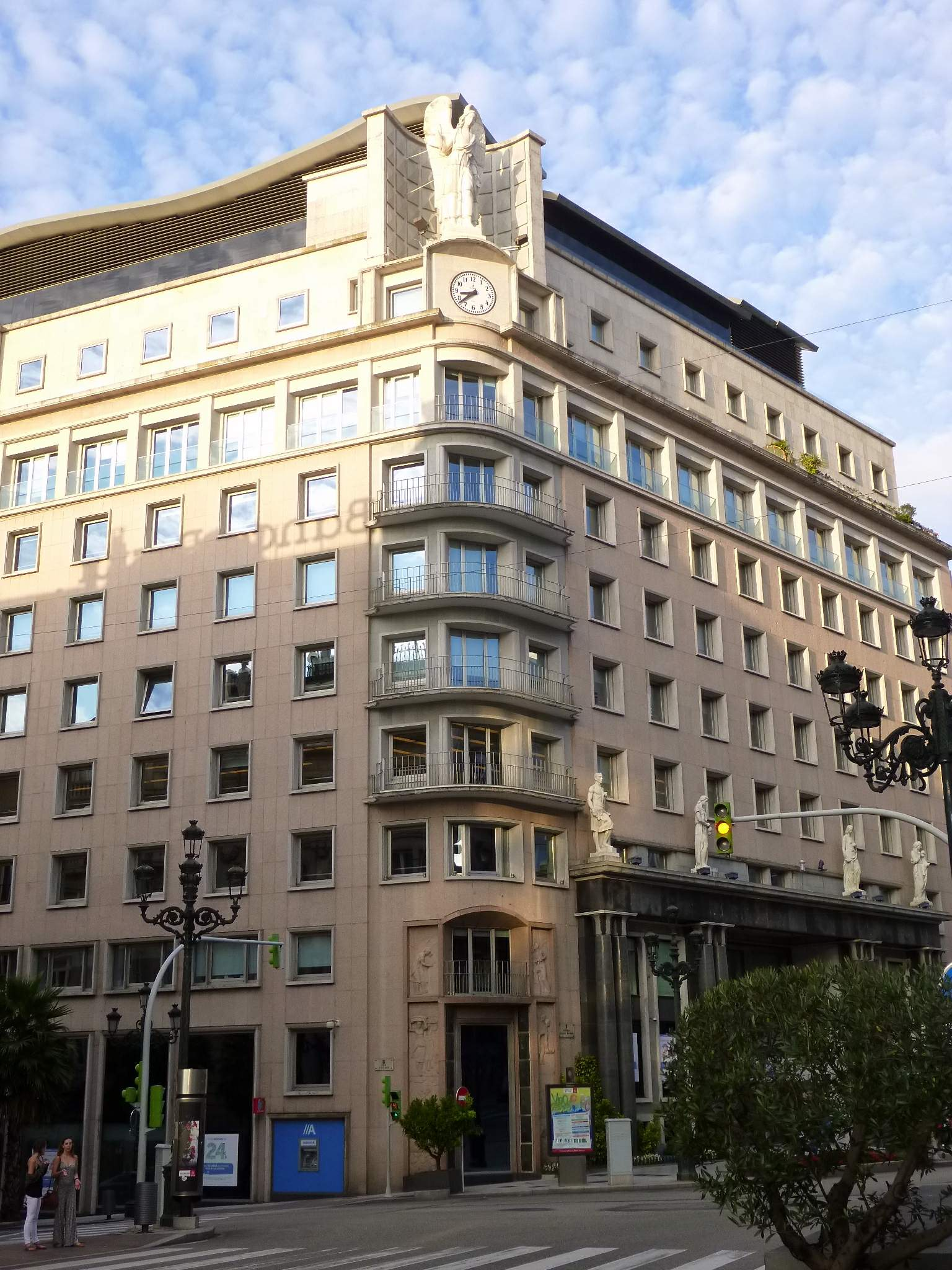
Abanca head office, Vigo

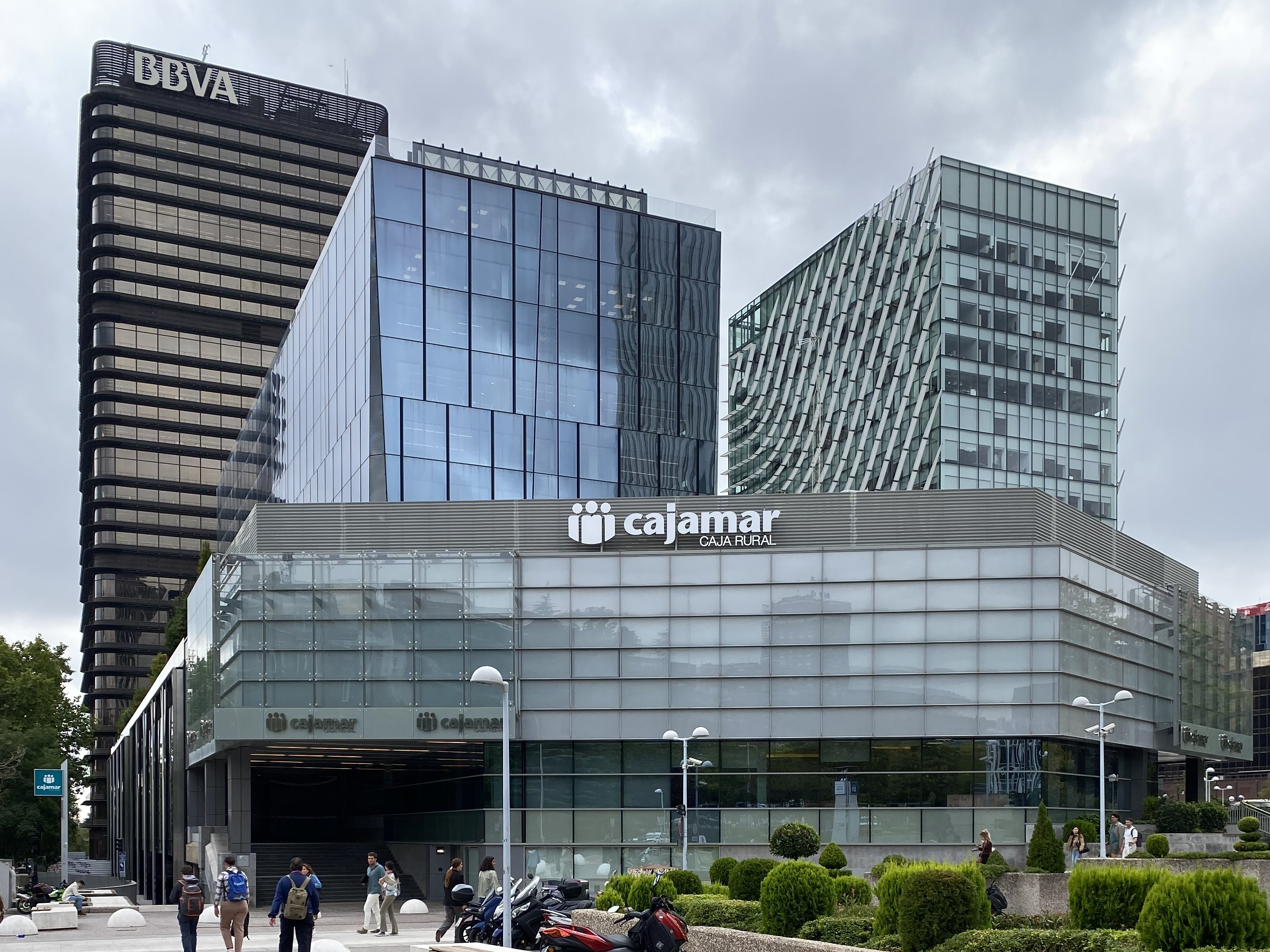
Cajamar Group head office, Madrid

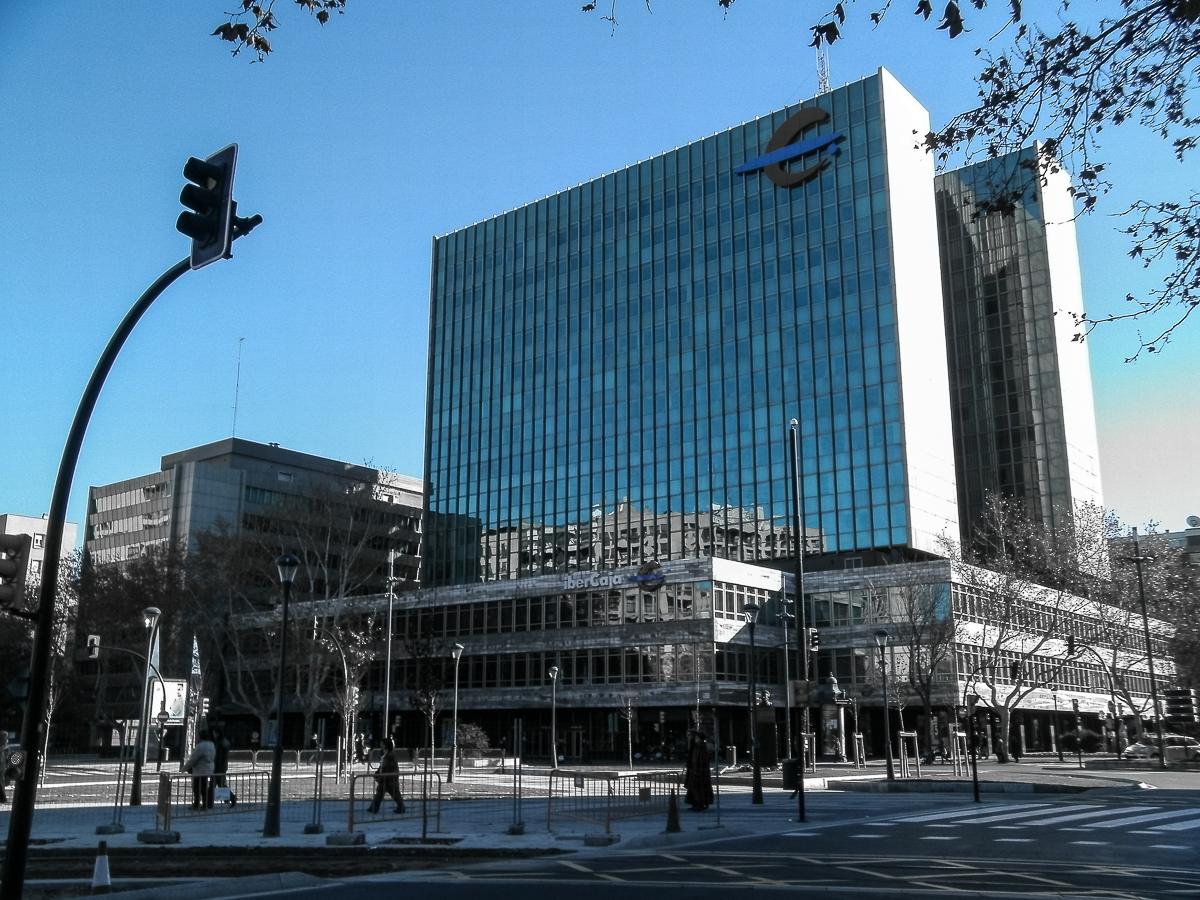
Ibercaja head office, Zaragoza

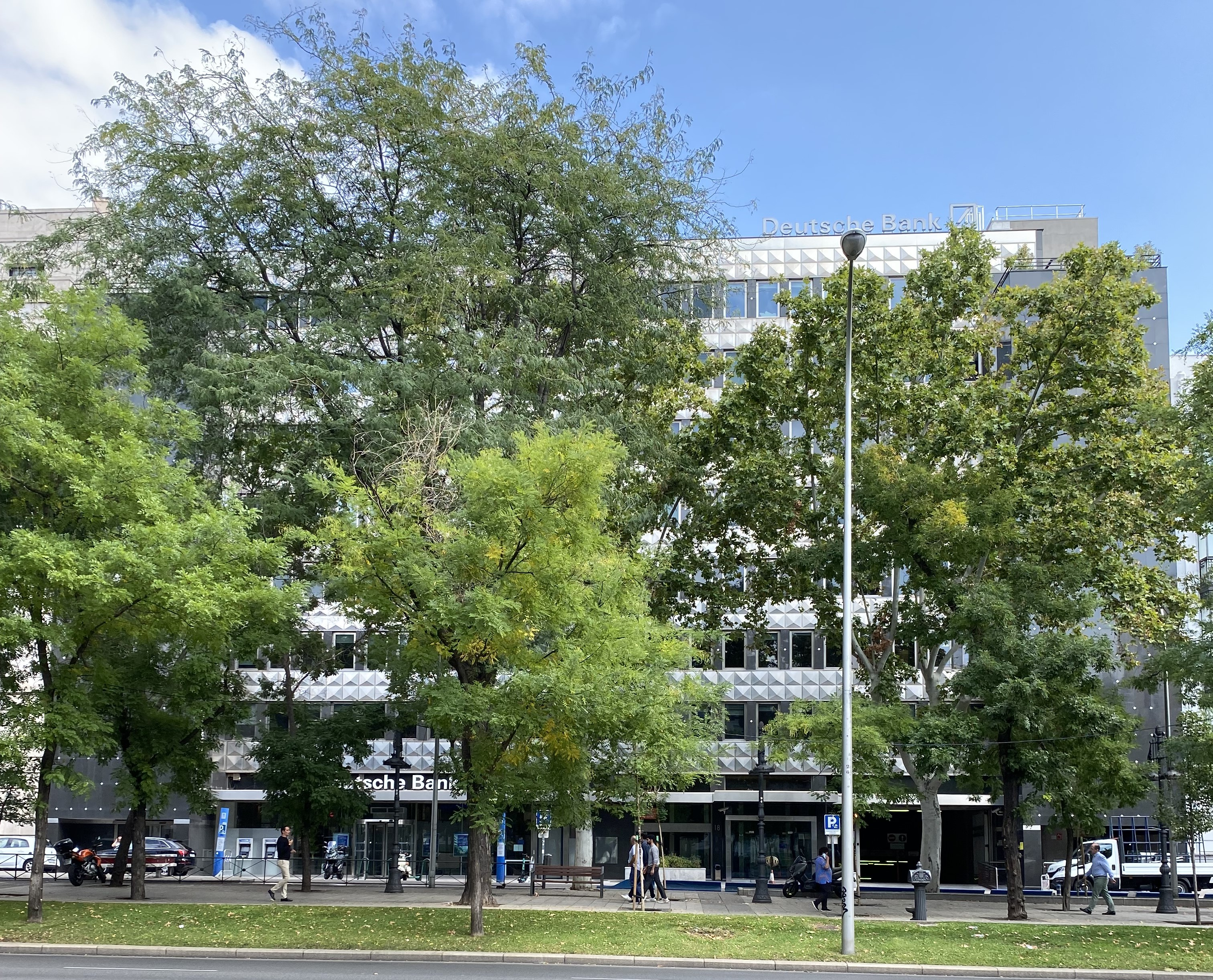
Deutsche Bank Spain head office, Madrid

The following list of banks in Spain is to be understood within the framework of the European single market and European banking union, which means that Spain's banking system is more open to cross-border banking operations than peers outside of the EU. Spain's banking sector has also experienced significant digital transformation in the 2020s, with the growth of online banks, neobanks and mobile banking platforms.

== Policy framework ==
European banking supervision distinguishes between significant institutions (SIs) and less significant institutions (LSIs), with SI/LSI designations updated regularly by the European Central Bank (ECB). Significant institutions are directly supervised by the ECB using joint supervisory teams that involve the national competent authorities (NCAs) of individual participating countries. Less significant institutions are supervised by the relevant NCA on a day-to-day basis, under the supervisory oversight of the ECB. In the Spanish case, the NCA is the Bank of Spain.

== Significant institutions ==
As of 1 September 2025, the list of supervised institutions maintained by the ECB included the following ten Spanish banking groups as SIs, with names as indicated by the ECB for each group's consolidating entity. Of these, Santander has been consistently designated as Global systemically important bank (G-SIB) by the Financial Stability Board, including in its update of November 2025.

- Abanca Corporación Bancaria SA
- Banco Bilbao Vizcaya Argentaria SA (BBVA)
- Banco de Sabadell SA
- Banco Santander SA
- Bankinter SA
- CaixaBank SA
- Banco de Crédito Social Cooperativo SA, consolidating entity of the Cajamar Cooperative Group
- Ibercaja Banco SA
- Kutxabank SA
- Unicaja Banco SA

A study published in 2024 assessed that the bank with most aggregate assets in Spain (as opposed to total consolidated assets) as of end-2023 was CaixaBank at €569 billion, followed by Santander (€535 billion), BBVA (€468 billion), Sabadell (€235 billion), Bankinter (€113 billion), Unicaja (€93 billion), Abanca (€75 billion), Kutxabank (€64 billion), Cajamar (€60 billion), Ibercaja (€55 billion), ING ((€33 billion, via a branch), and Deutsche Bank (€22 billion, via a subsidiary). Other euro-area banks with subsidiaries in Spain include BNP Paribas (via Cetelem), Crédit Agricole (via CACEIS), and Banca Mediolanum.

== Less significant institutions ==
As of 1 September 2025, the ECB's list of supervised institutions included 73 Spanish LSIs.

=== High-impact LSIs ===
Of these, five were designated by the ECB as "high-impact" on the basis of several criteria including size:

- Banca March SA
- Caja Laboral Popular Coop. De Credito, an independent cooperative bank
- Cecabank SA, a former entity of the Spanish Confederation of Savings Banks
- Grucajrural Inversiones SLU and Caja Rural de Navarra SCC, two entities of the cooperative Grupo Caja Rural that are members of its institutional protection scheme (IPS)

=== Cooperative banks ===
In addition to the entities cited above as SI (Cajamar) or high-impact LSIs (Grucajrural Inversiones and Caja Rural de Navarra), 41 more Spanish LSIs were associated with the rural cooperative banking (caja rural) movement:

- 30 entities of the Grupo Caja Rural and members of its IPS: the central entity Banco Cooperativo Español plus the cajas rurales of Albacete (Globalcaja), Albal, Algemesi, Aragon, Asturias, Burgos (Cajaviva), Casas Ibañez, Extremadura, Galega, Gijon, Granada, Jaen, L'Alcudia, Les Coves de Vinroma, Nuestra Señora La Esperanza de Onda, Salamanca, San Agustin de Fuente Alamo (Caja Rural Regional), San José de Alcora, San José de Almassora, Soria, Sur, Teruel, Villamalea, Vinaros, Zamora, Caixa Popular, Caja Rural Central, Cajasiete, and Ruralnostra
- 9 entities of the Solventia Cooperative Group: cajas rurales of Almendralejo (central entity), Adamuz - Nuestra Madre del Sol, Baena, Cañete Torres, Nueva Carteya, Utrera, Benicarlo, La Vall San Isidro, and Banco de Depositos SA
- 2 independent cajas rurales: Caja Rural de Guissona, and Eurocaja Rural

One more cooperative bank was listed as LSI (in addition to above-mentioned Caja Laboral), albeit not a caja rural:

- Caixa de Credit dels Enginyers - Caja de Crédito Ingenieros SCC

=== Other Spanish LSIs ===
The remaining 20 domestic Spanish LSIs were:

- Liberty Partners SL, owner of Allfunds Bank
  - Allfunds Bank SAU
- Arquia Bank SA
- Asesores y Gestores Financieros SA, owner of A&G Banco
  - A&G Banco SA
- Banca Pueyo SA
- Banco Inversis SA
- CBNK Banco de Colectivos SA
- Colonya - Caixa d'Estalvis de Pollença
- EBN Banco de Negocios SA
- Miralta Holding SLU, owner of Miralta Finance Bank
  - Miralta Finance Bank SA
- MyInvestor Banco SA
- Caja de Ahorros y Monte de Piedad de Ontinyent
- Renta 4 Banco SA
- WP XII Financial Holdings Coop. UA, Dutch affiliate of Warburg Pincus
  - Valvorac ITG SL, intermediate holding entity
  - Singular Bank SAU, owned by WP XII via Valvorac
- Aneto Sàrl (in Luxembourg), owner of WiZink
  - WiZink Bank SA

=== Non-euro-area-controlled LSIs ===
Based on the same ECB list, six Spanish LSIs were affiliates of financial groups based outside the euro area:

- (Andorra) Andbank España Banca Privada SA, subsidiary of Andbank
- (Libya) Aresbank SA, also known as Banco Árabe Español, a joint venture in which Kuwait Foreign Trading Contracting & Investment Company and Libyan Foreign Bank each own a 30 percent stake
- (Andorra) Banco Alcala SA, subsidiary of Creand
- (Ecuador) Banco Pichincha España SA, subsidiary of Banco Pichincha
- (Morocco) Bank of Africa Europe SA, subsidiary of Bank of Africa
- (Sweden) Spanish branch of TF Bank AB

== Third-country branches ==
As of 13 October 2025, the following banking groups established outside the European Economic Area had branches in Spain:

- Banco de la Nación Argentina
- (United States) FCE Bank
- (United States) JPMorgan Chase
- (Switzerland) UBS

== Other institutions ==
The Bank of Spain and Official Credit Institute are public credit institutions that do not hold a banking license under EU law.

== Defunct banks ==
A number of former Spanish banks, defined as having been headquartered in the present-day territory of Spain, are documented on Wikipedia. Many came to an end as a consequence of the 2008–2014 Spanish real estate crisis. They are listed below in chronological order of establishment.

- Monte de Piedad de Segovia (1636-2013)
- Monte de Piedad de Madrid (1702-1869)
- Banco Etcheverría (1717-2014)
- Banco Pastor (1776-2011)
- Caja de Ahorros de Jerez (1834-1993)
- Banco Condal (1837-1984)
- Caja Madrid (1838-2010)
- Monte de Piedad y Caja de Ahorros de Sevilla (1842-2007)
- Banco de Andalucía (1844-2009)
- Bank of Isabella II (1844-1847)
- Caixa d'Estalvis i Mont de Pietat de Barcelona (1844-1990)
- Banco de Barcelona (1845-1920)
- Banco Español de Ultramar (1845-1846)
- Banca Arnús (1846-1947)
- Banco de Fomento y Ultramar (1846-1856)
- Banco Gallego (1847-2014)
- Banca Vicens (1848-1939)
- Vital Kutxa (1850-2012)
- Sociedad de Crédito Mobiliario Español (1856-1902)
- Banco de Bilbao (1857-1988)
- Banco Simeón (1857-2006)
- Banca Catalana (1859-1988)
- Caixa Sabadell (1859-2010)
- Caixa d'Estalvis de la Província de Girona (1862-1869)
- Caixa d'Estalvis de Mataró (1863-1960)
- Caixa Laietana (1863-2012)
- Banco de Oviedo (1864-1874)
- Banca García-Calamarte (1865-1942)
- Caixa Manresa (1865-2010)
- Banca Masaveu (1870-1993)
- Banco Urquijo (1870-2006)
- Banco de Castilla (1871-2008)
- Banco de Crédito Balear (1872-2008)
- Banco Hipotecario de España (1872-1991)
- Caja Navarra (1872-2012)
- Monte de Piedad y Caja de Ahorros de Alcoy (1875-1975)
- Caixa Terrassa (1877-2010)
- Caixa d'Estalvis de Vilanova (1877-1932)
- Monte de Piedad y Caja de Ahorros de Córdoba (1878-1995)
- Banco Peninsular (1879-1983)
- Kutxa (1879-2012)
- Caja de Ahorros de Asturias (1880-2011)
- Banco de Tortosa (1881-1956)
- Caja de Ahorros de Cádiz (1884-1991)
- Banco Transatlántico (1889-1994)
- Banco del Comercio (1891-2000)
- Caixa Manlleu (1896-2010)
- Banco de Gijón (1899-1971)
- Banco Guipuzcoano (1899-2012)
- Banco Mercantil de Santander (1899-1946)
- Banco Castellano (1900-1970)
- Banco Hispano Americano (1900-1991)
- Banco de Valencia (1900-2013)
- Monte de Piedad y Caja de Ahorros de Almería (1900-1991)
- Banco Atlántico (1901-2003)
- Banco Hispano Colonial (1901-1946)
- Banco de Vasconia (1901-2008)
- Banco de Vizcaya (1901-1988)
- Banco Español de Crédito (1902-2012)
- Caja de Ahorros de Antequera (1904-1991)
- Caja de Pensiones para la Vejez y de Ahorros de Cataluña y Baleares (1904-1990)
- Bilbao Bizkaia Kutxa (1907-2012)
- Caja Postal de Ahorros (1909-1991)
- Monte de Piedad y Caja de Ahorros de Ronda (1909-1991)
- Banco Zaragozano (1910-2006)
- Banco Herrero (1911-2002)
- Banco Matritense (1911-1930)
- Banco de Tolosa (1911-1969)
- Caja de Ahorros de Plasencia (1911-1990)
- Banco Central (1919-1991)
- Banco de Cataluña (1920-1931)
- Banco de Crédito Industrial (1920-1991)
- Banco de Torrelavega (1920-1942)
- Banco Puche (1924-1994)
- Banco de Crédito Agrícola (1925-1991)
- Banco Popular Español (1926-2017)
- Caja de Burgos (1926-2010)
- Caixa Catalunya (1926-2010)
- Caixa d'Estalvis de la Sagrada Família (1926-1979)
- Banco Exterior de España (1928-1991)
- Caixa de Pontevedra (1930-2000)
- Banco Mercantil e Industrial (1931-1977)
- Caja de Ahorros Provincial de Orense (1932-2000)
- Banco Coca (1934-1978)
- Caixa Girona (1940-2010)
- Banco de Murcia (1946-2002)
- Banco Mercantil de Manresa (1947-1980)
- Caja de Ahorros de Málaga (1949-1991)
- Caixa Tarragona (1949-2010)
- Caja Provincial de Ahorros de Córdoba (1953-1995)
- Banco de Asturias (1964-2003)
- Caja de Guadalajara (1964-2010)
- Caja Murcia (1964-2010)
- Banco de Alicante (1965-1983)
- Caja de Ahorros Provincial de Zamora (1965-1990)
- Caixa Rural Provincial de Girona (1966-1988)
- Bankoa (1975-2021)
- Caja de Ahorros del Mediterráneo (1975-2011)
- Caixa Galicia (1978-2010)
- Caja de Jaén (1980-2010)
- Caja General de Ahorros de Canarias (1984-2012)
- Banco Bilbao Vizcaya (1988-1999)
- Caja España (1990-2010)
- Argentaria (1991-1999)
- Banco Caixa Geral (1991-2020)
- Banco Central Hispano (1991-1999)
- Banco Gallego (1991-2014)
- Caja Duero (1991-2010)
- Caja Castilla-La Mancha (1992-2010)
- Caja San Fernando (1993-2007)
- CajaSur (1995-2010)
- Sabadell Solbank (1997-2014)
- Caixanova (2000-2010)
- Cajasol (2007-2010)
- Banca Civica (2010-2012)
- Banco Mare Nostrum (2010-2018)
- Bankia (2010-2021)
- Caja3 (2010-2014)
- CatalunyaCaixa (2010-2016)
- Novacaixagalicia (2010-2011)
- Liberbank (2011-2021)
- Unnim (2011-2012)
- EVO Banco (2012-2025)

== See also ==
- List of banks in the euro area
- List of banks in Europe
