= Bankoa =

Spanish bank

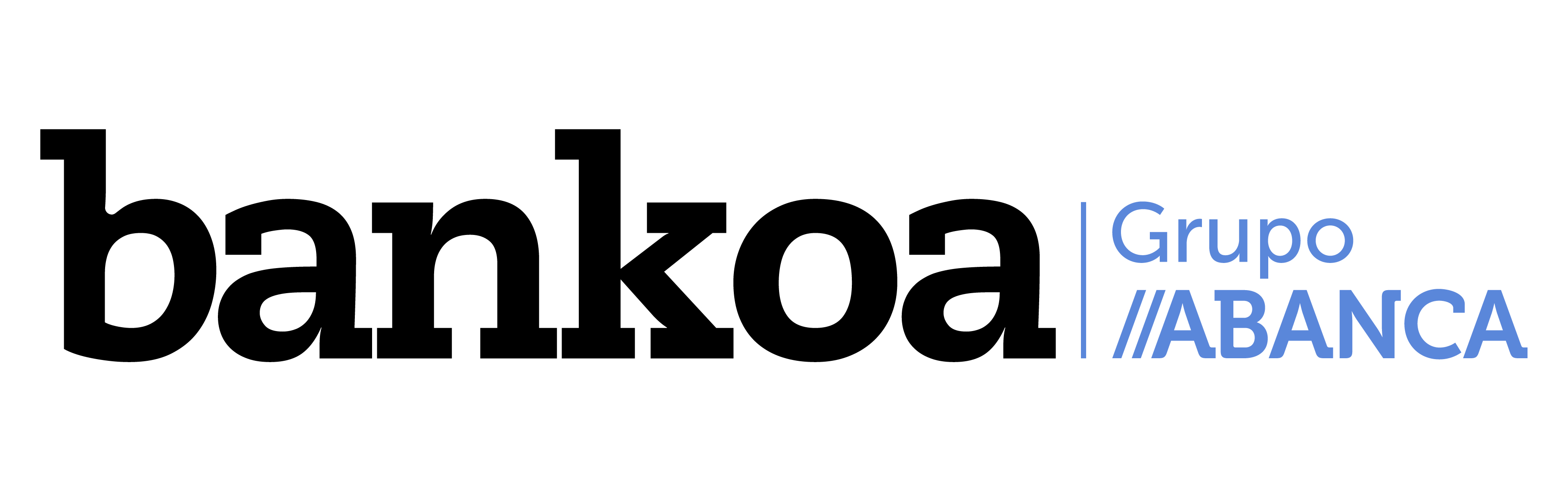
- Industry: Financial services
- Founded: 1975
- Headquarters: Avenida de la Libertad 5, San Sebastián, Spain
- Key people: Kepa Joseba Egiguren Iriondo (CEO)
- Website: www.bankoa.es

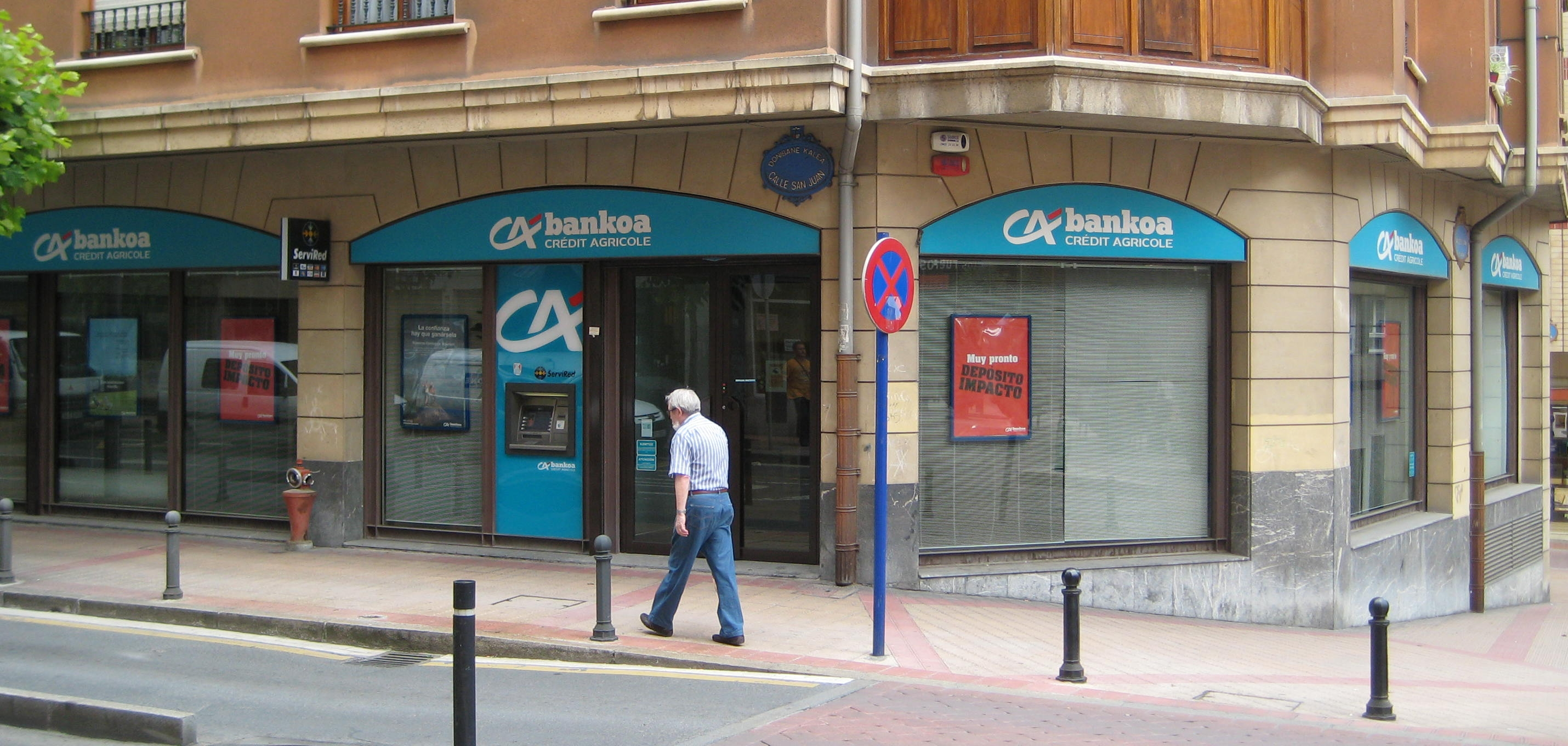
Branch of the Bankoa in Barakaldo, Biscay.

Bankoa (stylized in all lowercase) is a traditional Spanish bank founded in 1975 and located in San Sebastián.

The original name was the Banco Industrial de Guipúzcoa and worked as an industrial bank. In 1997, it was acquired by the Crédit Agricole, the name was changed to Bankoa, and it became a universal bank.

In July 2020, Abanca and the Crédit Agricole group signed a preliminary agreement for the purchase of the latter's shares in Bankoa.

On January 28, 2021, Abanca completed the purchase of Bankoa. The Galician entity formalized the acquisition of 99.81% of Bankoa's capital for 122.4 million euros. To the owners of the remaining nearly 0.2% of the shares, Abanca offered 18.3 of its own shares for each share of Bankoa.

On November 14, 2021, ABANCA completed the integration of Bankoa with the completion of the last two operations of the process: the brand implementation and the transfer of the activity to ABANCA's technological and operational platform. ABANCA will operate in the Basque Country, Navarra and La Rioja under the brand name "Bankoa ABANCA".

== Sponsorship ==
Between 1989 and 1995, Bankoa was the main kit sponsor of Spanish football club Real Sociedad.

== See also ==
- List of banks in Spain
