= Banco Caixa Geral =

Defunct Spanish bank

Banco Caixa Geral had its headquarters in Vigo, Spain, and was a subsidiary of Portugal's the largest bank, the government-owned Caixa Geral de Depositos.

== History ==
In 1991, Caixa Geral acquired Banco de Extremadura and the former operations of Chase Manhattan Bank (Spain), which became Banco Luso Español. Banco de Extremadura traced its origins back to 1939. In 1965, the name became Sanchez de Caceres and in 1972 transformed into Banco de Extremadura. Then in 1994, Caixa Geral acquired Banco Simeón from Banesto. Banco Simeón had been founded in 1857 in Vigo, Spain. In 2002, Caixa Geral merged all three banks under the Banco Simeón name. In 2006, Banco Simeón changed its name to Banco Caixa Geral.

On November 22, 2018, ABANCA was announced by the Portuguese Council of Ministers as the successful bidder of Banco Caixa Geral for approximately €364 million.

On 14 October 2019, ABANCA closed the purchase of Banco Caixa Geral for a total amount of €384 million, compared to the initially estimated €364 million, and came to control 99.79% of Banco Caixa Geral's capital. Following the merger, ABANCA would add €7 billion of business from more than 131,000 customers, as well as 110 new branches and more than 500 employees, with a special presence in the provinces closest to the Portuguese border.

On March 16, 2020, ABANCA completed the technological, brand and legal integration of Banco Caixa Geral, following the completion of the legal and accounting merger of the two entities, which took place on March 13 with its registration in the Commercial Registry of La Coruña.

== See also ==
- List of banks in Spain
