= Banco Gallego =

Spanish bank, merged in 2014

Banco Gallego, S.A.
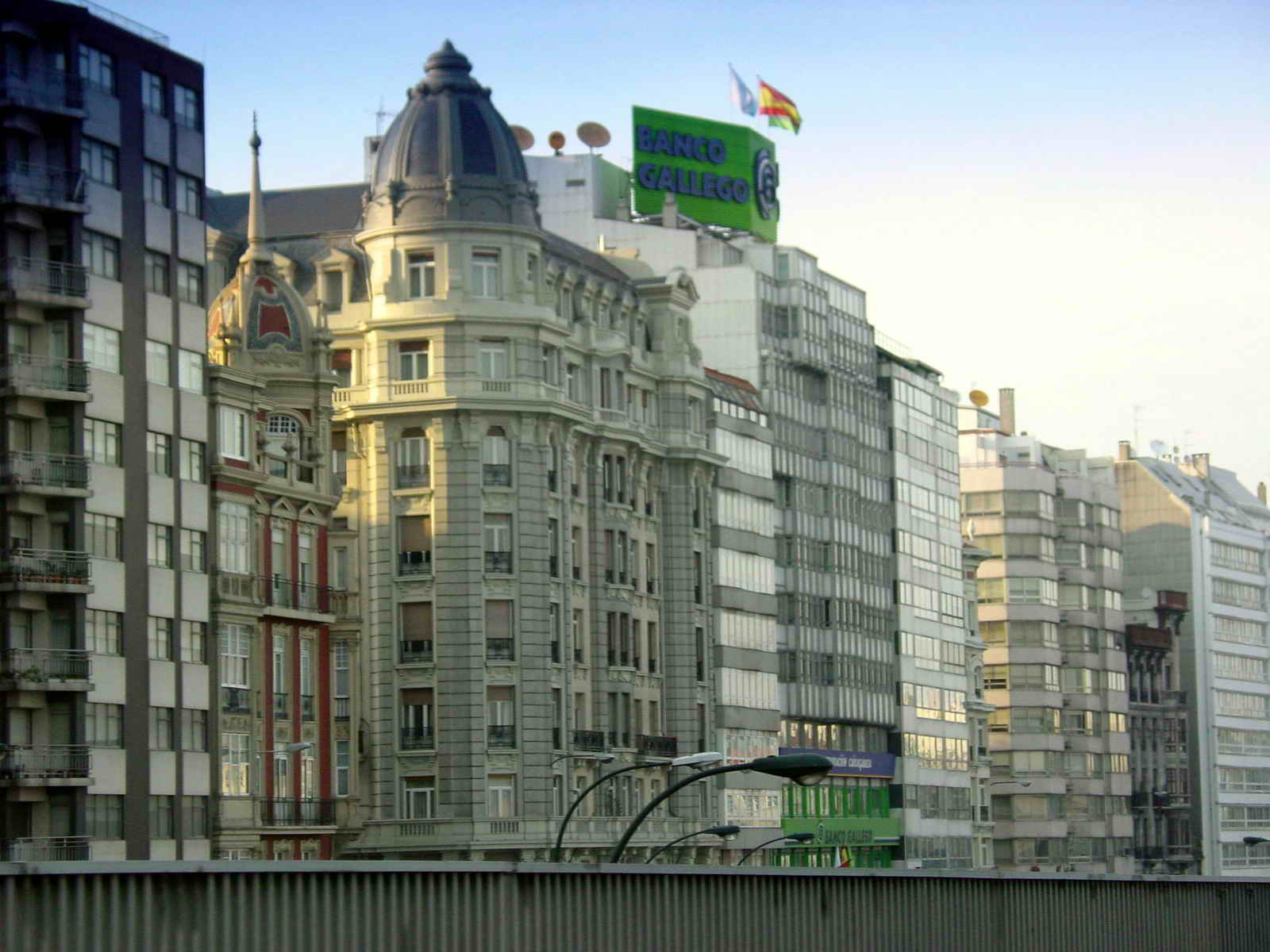
- Trade name: SabadellGallego
- Company type: Sociedad Anónima
- ISIN: ES0113051009
- Industry: Financial services
- Predecessor: Banco 21, S.A.
- Founded: Santiago de Compostela, Spain (July 22, 1991)
- Founder: Manuel Pérez Sáenz
- Defunct: 4 August 2014
- Headquarters: Santiago de Compostela, Spain
- Number of locations: 183 branches
- Area served: Nationwide
- Key people: Juan Manuel Urgoiti López-Ocaña, Chairman; José Luis Losada Rodríguez, Director-general
- Parent: Banco de Sabadell, S.A.
- Website: www.bancogallego.es

Banco Gallego, S.A. was a Spanish bank based in Santiago de Compostela, Galicia. Operating primarily in the region of Galicia the bank had branches throughout Spain. On the April 17, 2013 Banco Gallego was sold to Banco Sabadell for the symbolic sum of 1 euro and was integrated in Banco Sabadell at the beginning of 2014.

== History ==
=== Bailout ===
On March 15, 2013 Banco Gallego was effectively nationalized when a share offer organized by the bank was only taken up by Fund for Orderly Bank Restructuring and some small investors. The Spanish government invested 80 million euros into the bank with a controlling stake of 99.95%.

=== Sale ===
The nationalised bank was then auctioned off, with offers tabled by Banco Sabadell, Banco Espírito Santo (Portugal) and Banesco (Venezuela).

== See also ==
- List of banks in Spain
