= Spanish property bubble =

Real estate bubble

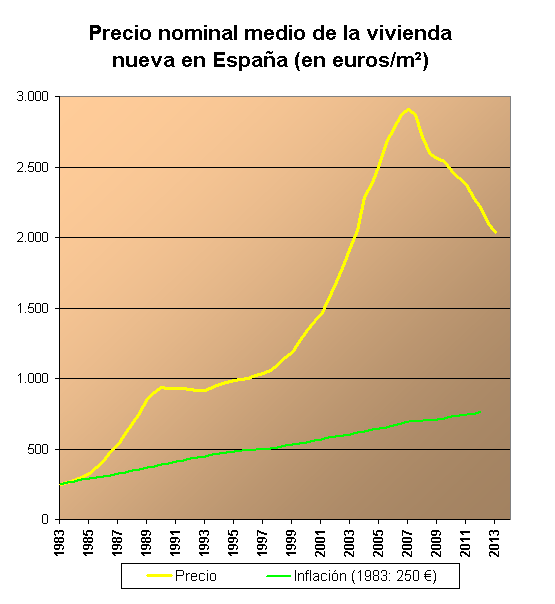
Evolution of the price of square meter in Spain, in euros

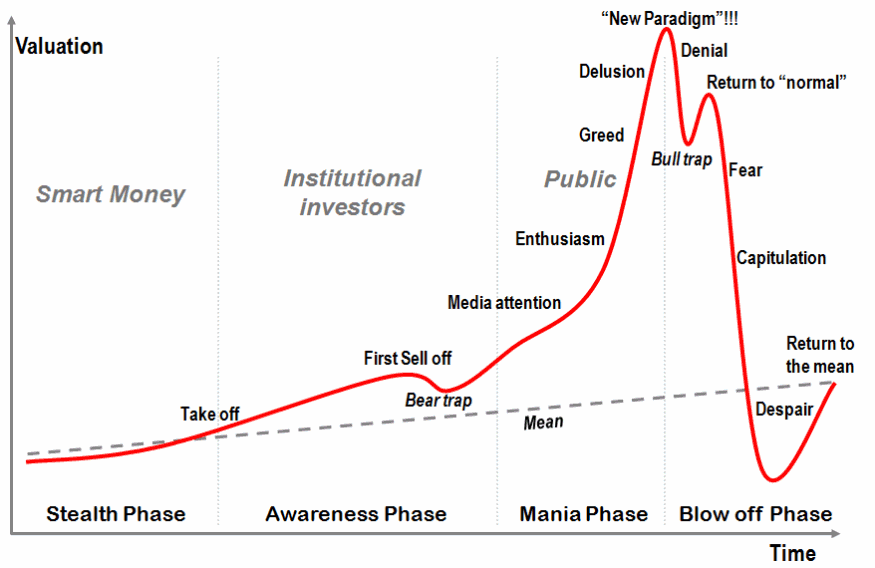
Stages of a speculative bubble

The Spanish property bubble is the collapsed overshooting part of a long-term price increase of real estate prices in Spain. This long-term price increase has happened in various stages from 1985 up to 2008. The housing bubble can be clearly divided into three periods: 1985–1991, in which the price nearly tripled; 1992–1996, in which the price remained somewhat stable; and 1996–2008, in which prices grew astonishingly again. The 2008–2014 Spanish real estate crisis caused prices to fall. In 2013, Raj Badiani, an economist at IHS Global Insight in London, estimated that the value of residential real estate has dropped more than 30 percent since 2007 and that house prices would fall at least 50 percent from the peak by 2015. Alcidi and Gros noted; “If construction were to continue at the still relatively high rate of today, the process of absorption of the bubble would take more than 30 years”.

== General evaluations ==
If the facts about the real estate market were already accepted, by the different actors, it would not always be in agreement with the evaluation that makes such data. The same Bank of Spain rejected the idea that would have revolved around a speculative bubble:

The results of the work carried out in the housing market did not support, according to the Bank of Spain, the hypothesis of equilibrium or a bubble, but rather reinforced the confusion that the situation of the Spanish real estate market was characterized at the end of 2004 by an over-valuation of suitable housing with a gradual uptake of the found discrepancy among the observed prices and the explained prices by its fundamental in the long term.

However, the official reports of that entity also recognized the over-valuation of real estate assets, and already in the year 2002 alerted about a possible depreciation of housing. In 2003, García Montalvo published one of the first articles about the formation of a real estate bubble in Spain.

Those who denied the existence of a speculative bubble, and at most accepted a small over-valuation of assets, argued for the good state of the Spanish economy, the employment and sustained growth data, and very small default rates, attributing the growth of prices to a pressure of demand.

On the other extreme were the critiques of those who estimated that things were occurring before a real estate bubble of unpredictable consequences:

A colossal speculative [real estate] bubble has been developing for many years already, which has been characterized by the Economist (June 18, 2005) as a major speculative process in the history of capitalism.

In general, from the critical positions it was affirmed that the dependence of the Spanish economy on the construction industry, as well as excessive debt, could have provoked an economic recession in the long term, especially with the rise in interest rates, that eroded domestic consumption and raised the unemployment rate and the default levels, finally leading to a devaluation of real estate assets.

== Dynamics ==
Home ownership in Spain is above 80%. The desire to own one's own home was encouraged by governments in the 1960s and '70s, and has thus become part of the Spanish psyche. In addition, tax regulation encourages ownership: 15% of mortgage payments are deductible from personal income taxes. Furthermore, the oldest apartments are controlled by non-inflation-adjusted rent controls and eviction is slow, thereby discouraging renting. Banks offered 40-year and, more recently, 50-year mortgages.

As feared, when the speculative bubble popped, Spain became one of the worst affected countries. According to Eurostat, over the June 2007-June 2008 period, Spain was the European country with the sharpest plunge in construction rates. In 2008, new construction came virtually to a halt, but prices were initially relatively stable with sellers reluctant to offer large discounts. The national average price as of late 2008 was 2,095 euros/m2. Actual sales over the July 2007-June 2008 period were down an average 25.3% (with the lion's share of the loss arguably happening in the 2008 tract of this period). Some regions have been more affected than others: Catalonia was ahead in this regard with a 42.2% sales plunge while sparsely populated regions like Extremadura were down a mere 1.7% over the same period.

Unlike much of the United States, but like most European countries, Spain does not recognize mortgage loans as nonrecourse debt. Since property prices dropped enough for most foreclosures to only account for 60% of the loan, those evicted have large debts for property they no longer own.

== Figures ==
=== Prices and number of houses built ===
According to the reports of the Bank of Spain, between 1976 and 2003, the price of housing in Spain doubled in real terms, which means, in nominal terms, a multiplication of 16. In the period for 1997—2006, the price of housing in Spain had risen about 150% in nominal terms, equivalent to 100% growth in real terms. It is stated that from 2000 to 2009, 5 million new housing units had been added to the existing stock of 20 million. In 2008, the real estate market started to drop fast, and house prices decreased dramatically by 8% in that year. In the period for 2007-2013, Spanish house prices fell by 37%. Each year almost a million homes were built in Spain, more than in Germany, France, and England combined.

=== Real estate debt ===
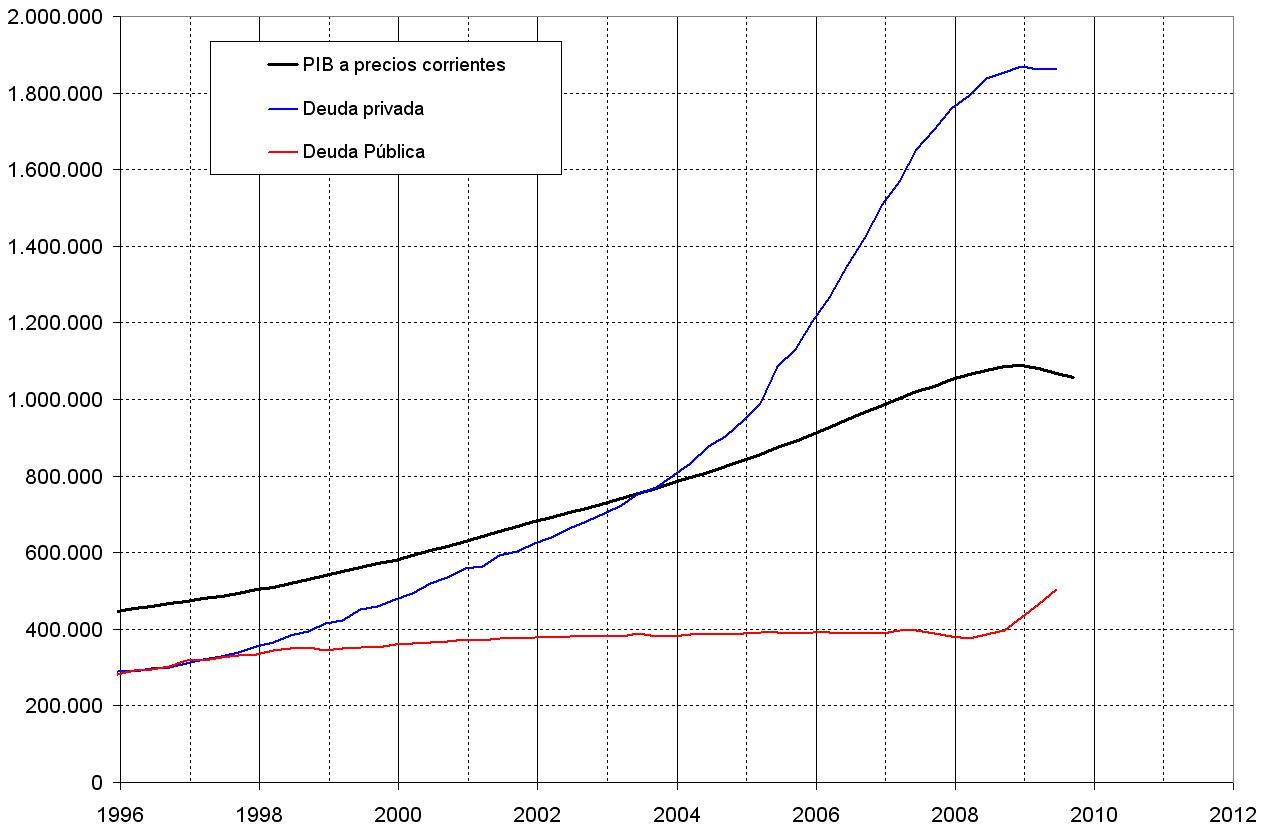
The housing bubble was fed by credit to private sector individuals and developers, which led to a significant increase in private debt (blue) that stopped with the 2008 financial crisis, ending the speculative process.

One of the main effects of this situation is the growth of household debt. Since usually the purchase of housing, whether to live in or to invest, is financed with mortgage loans, the price increase implies an increase in debt. Spanish consumer debt tripled in less than ten years. In 1986, debt represented 34% of disposable income, in 1997 it rose to 52%, and in 2005 it came to 105%. In 2006, a quarter of the population was indebted with maturities of more than 15 years. From 1990 to 2004, the average length of mortgages increased from 12 to 25 years. The Bank of Spain reported that household savings in 2006 had been overwhelmed by debt. In fact, the Bank of Spain has warned each year about the high rates of indebtedness of Spanish households, which according to the institution was unsustainable. Private debt stood at 832.289 billion euros at the end of 2006, an increase of 18.53% year-on-year, and reached 1 trillion euros by the end of 2010. The Bank of Spain also warned on the excessive indebtedness of the construction industry.

The President of the Chambers of Commerce of Spain, Javier Gómez Navarro, said at an event organized by the Association of Financial Journalists, entities "never recover" 30% of the debt owed to the housing sector. According to the Bank of Spain, this debt amounted to 325,000 million euros; as of December 2009, it totaled 96.824 million in bad loans. The president of the Chambers regretted that the Spanish financial system did not admit the impact of the crisis on their assets; the Bank of Spain affirmed that it was the responsibility of the whole financial sector: "In Spain, it was never wanted to recognize that the financial system was not in good shape, as this would have forced the banking sector to start re-capitalising policies. The goal of the state's policy has so far been to gain time, to start a mild bank recapitalisation, but time is now running out".

According to R.R. de Acuna & Asociados, a real-estate consulting firm, more than half of the country’s 67,000 developers can be categorized as “zombies”, having liabilities that exceed their assets and only enough income to repay the interest on their loans. According to the Bank of Spain, the rate of household loans in doubt among the total amount of credit increased from 0.8% in 2005 to 6.2% in 2011.

== See also ==
- Great Recession in Spain
- Savings bank (Spain)
- Unemployment in Spain
- 2008–2014 Spanish real estate crisis
- Great Recession
- Neinor Homes
