= Banca Pueyo =

Spanish Bank based in Extremadura, Spain

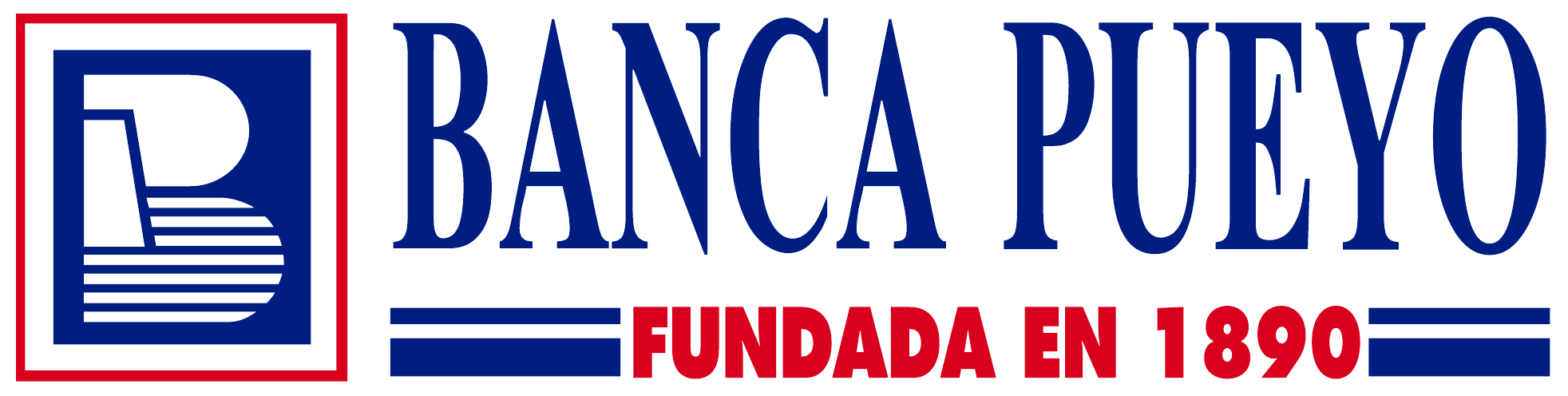
- Native name: Banca Pueyo SA
- Industry: Financial services
- Founded: 1890; 136 years ago
- Headquarters: C/Virgen de Guadalupe, nº 2, 06700 Villanueva de la Serena, Badajoz, Spain
- Key people: Francisco Javier del Pueyo Cortijo (President)
- Products: Banking services
- Number of employees: 296 (2018)
- Website: www.bancapueyo.es

Banca Pueyo is a Spanish bank founded in 1890 and located in Villanueva de la Serena city, south-west of Spain. As of 2018, Banca Pueyo had 115 branches and 296 employees.

== History ==
The bank is called Pueyo after the founding family and at the start it was a banking house serving as a regional bank.

In 2015 the bank celebrated 125 years from the foundation, during which time it had opened 116 offices and employs about 276 people, serves to about 120,000 clients.

== See also ==
- List of banks in Spain
