= Unnim =

Spanish bank

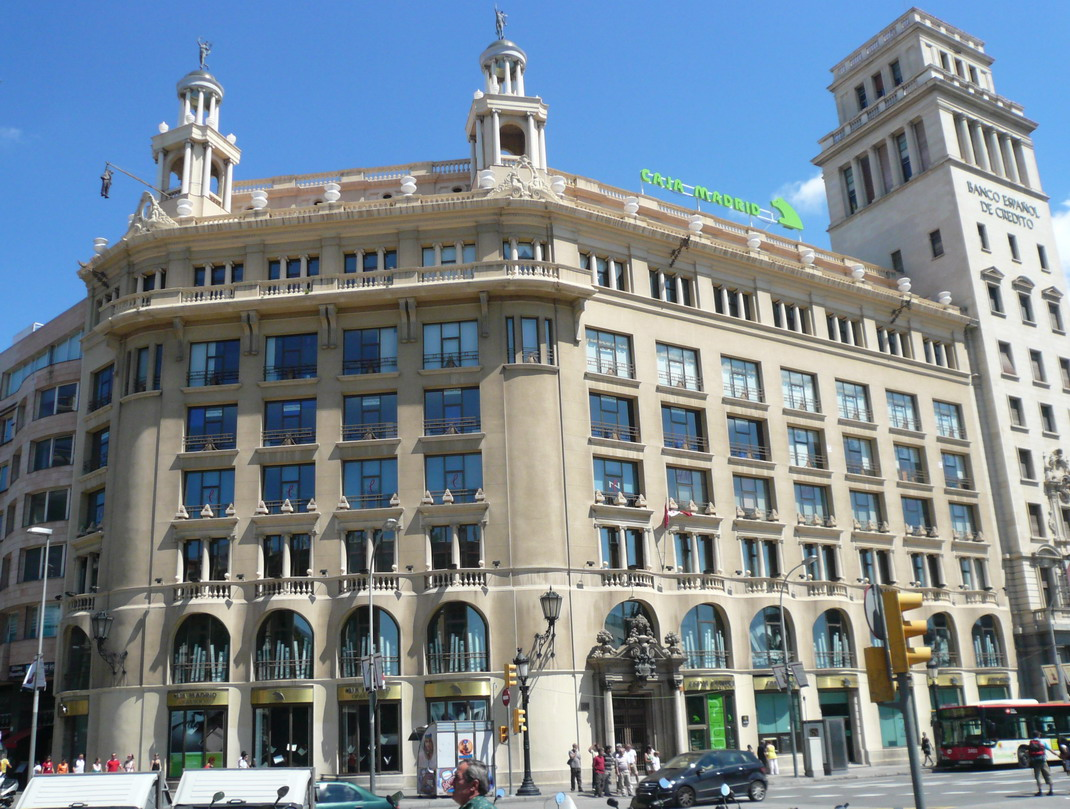
Casa Pich i Pon, former location of Unnim

Unnim was Spanish savings bank resulting from the merger of three other savings banks (Caixa Manlleu, Caixa Sabadell and Caixa Terrassa). As of December 2011, Unnim was under bailout in the scheme known as Fondo de Reestructuración Ordenada Bancaria or FROB in short. The Spanish government had taken a participation of 100% in September 2011.

Unnim was among the eight banks that failed the bank stress test published in July 2011

In March 2012, it was bought by BBVA.

== See also ==
- Fondo de Reestructuración Ordenada Bancaria
- Savings bank (Spain)
- List of banks in Spain
