= CatalunyaCaixa =

Catalan bank

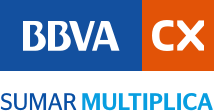
- Company type: Bank
- Industry: Financial services
- Headquarters: Barcelona, Catalonia, Spain
- Key people: Adolf Todó i Rovira (CEO)
- Products: Consumer Banking; Corporate Banking
- Total assets: €81.020 billion (2010)
- Number of employees: 8,000 (2010)
- Parent: BBVA
- Website: www.catalunyacaixa.com

CatalunyaCaixa (Catalan pronunciation: [kətəˌluɲəˈkaʃə]) was the trading name of Catalunya Banc S.A., a Catalan bank with headquarters in Barcelona and owned by Banco Bilbao Vizcaya Argentaria (BBVA), and absorbed by it in 2016. Its area of influence is located mainly in Catalonia. It was the fourth-largest savings bank in Spain in terms of consolidated assets, with €81.020 billion.

It was founded on 1 July 2010 by the fusion of Caixa Catalunya, Caixa Tarragona and Caixa Manresa. The new savings bank had 1,212 branches and over 4 million customers.

During 2011 and 2012, CatalunyaCaixa received a total of €12.052 billion capital investment from the Spanish government's Fondo de Reestructuración Ordenada Bancaria (Fund for Orderly Bank Restructuring). The September 2011 capital injection effectively nationalised the bank, raising FROB's ownership to 89.74%.

In 2015, CatalunyaCaixa was purchased by Spanish banking group BBVA for a total of €1.187 billion.

On March 31, 2016, the boards of directors of BBVA and Catalunya Banc agreed to begin the process of merging, with the Catalan bank being integrated into BBVA. Catalunya Banc, operating under the commercial brand CatalunyaCaixa, had been part of this banking group since April 2015, with BBVA directly holding 98.4% of its share capital. On May 13, 2016, the shareholders' meeting of Catalunya Banc approved the integration of the Catalan entity into BBVA. On September 1, 2016, BBVA and Catalunya Banc formalized the merger deed, by which the bank presided over by Francisco González absorbed the latter, after obtaining authorization from the Ministry of Economy and completing the other procedures established by law.

On April 24, 2019, BBVA announced that it would unify its brand across all the markets in which it operated.

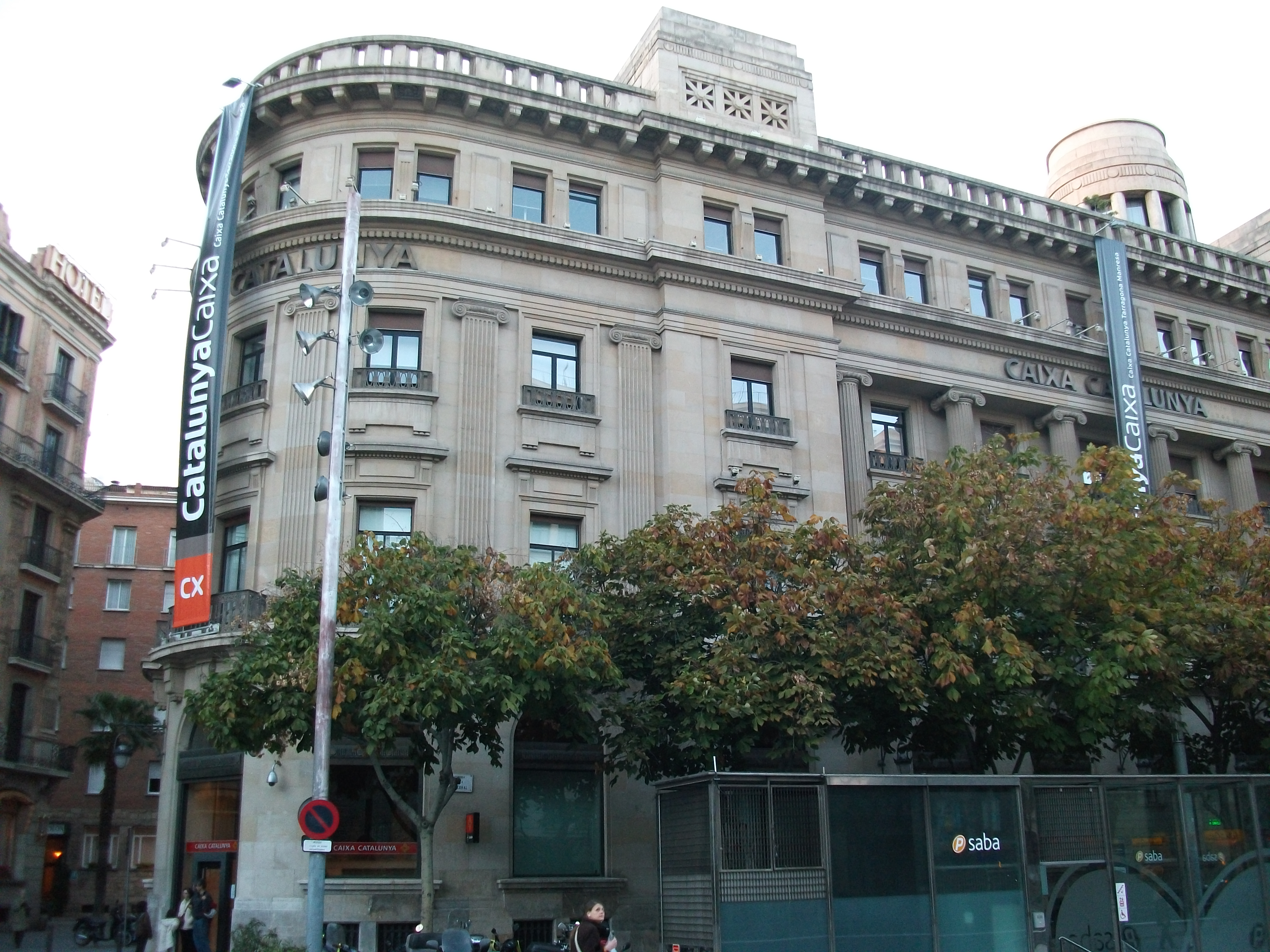
CatalunyaCaixa headquarters in Barcelona

== See also ==
- List of banks in Spain
