= Novacaixagalicia =

Caixa de Aforros de Galicia, Pontevedra, Ourense e Vigo
- Trade name: Novacaixagalicia
- Company type: Savings bank
- Industry: Financial services
- Predecessor: Caja de Ahorros de Galicia; Caja de Ahorros de Pontevedra, Vigo y Ourense
- Founded: A Coruña, Spain (December 1, 2010)
- Defunct: August 15, 2011
- Fate: Nationalized
- Successor: NCG Banco, S.A.; Fundación Novacaixagalicia
- Headquarters: A Coruña, Spain
- Key people: Julio Fernández Gayoso (Co-chairman); José Luis Méndez (Co-chairman)
- Services: Retail banking
- Website: www.afundacion.org

Caixa de Aforros de Galicia, Vigo, Ourense e Pontevedra (trading as Novacaixagalicia) was the name of a short-lived Spanish savings bank based in Galicia. It was created following the forced merger of the two major savings banks in the region, Caixa Galicia and Caixanova. This new caixa for Galicia became the fourth-largest in Spain with consolidated assets valued at €78.1 billion, and fourth-largest in terms of savings accounts, with €108.4 billion - 6% of Spanish savings banks.

Due to financial irregularities in the finances of the company, in little under a year this new savings bank would go on to be "bankised" as NCG Banco.

It was the first financial institution to be registered in the Galician language.

== See also ==
- List of banks in Spain
