= Esmênia Miranda =

Brazilian geographer and politician

- Esmênia Miranda in 2024

Mayor of São Luís
- Incumbent
- Assumed office 31 March 2026
- Preceded by: Eduardo Braide

Vice Mayor of São Luís
- In office 1 January 2021 – 31 March 2026
- Mayor: Eduardo Braide
- Preceded by: Julio Pinheiro

Personal details
- Born: Esmênia Miranda Ferreira da Silva; 18 July 1982 (age 44) Bacabal, Maranhão, Brazil
- Party: Social Democratic Party (2020–present)
- Education: State University of Maranhão
- Occupation: Geographer; historian; teacher; police officer
- Military career
- Allegiance: Brazil
- Branch: Military Police of Maranhão

Esmênia Miranda Ferreira da Silva (July 18, 1982) is a Brazilian geographer, historian, and politician affiliated with the Social Democratic Party (PSD). Since March 2026, she has served as mayor of São Luís, the capital of Maranhão state, becoming the fourth woman to hold that office.

== Biography ==
=== First years and education ===
Esmênia was born in the city of Bacabal, a municipality located in the interior of the state of Maranhão, in 1982. She earned a degree in geography from the State University of Maranhão (UEMA). At the same institution, she also earned a degree in history. Later, at the Federal University of Maranhão (UFMA), she defended her master’s thesis in history, where she conducted research titled The Value of a Little Black Girl”: Representations of Slaves in São Luís Newspapers from 1830 to 1850, in which she examines how enslaved peoples in Brazil were portrayed in the capital of Maranhão through the newspapers of the time.

=== Career ===
In 2007, she joined the Maranhão State Military Police (PMMA) as a career officer, working at the force’s Psychosocial Assistance Center (CAPS). In 2011, she began teaching history at Tiradentes I Military School in the state capital.

== Politics ==
A member of the Social Democratic Party (PSD), in 2020 she was part of the ticket led by Eduardo Braide (Podemos) in the 2020 São Luís election. The ticket emerged victorious after defeating Duarte Júnior’s (Republicanos) ticket in the runoff. In the 2024 election, alongside Eduardo Braide, now a member of the PSD, Esmênia once again led the ticket that had won in 2020. Once again, Braide and Esmênia won the election, this time in the first round, defeating Duarte Júnior once more, who was now a member of the Brazilian Socialist Party (PSB).

In March 2026, Esmênia took office as mayor of São Luís after Braide resigned from the mayoral position to run for governor of Maranhão in that year’s election. Upon assuming the office of mayor, Esmênia became the fourth woman to serve as mayor of São Luís. The last woman to hold the office had been Conceição Andrade, who left office in 1996.

=== Electoral performance ===
Year	Office	Party	Votes	Result	Ref.
2020	Vice Mayor of São Luís	PSD	270,557	Elected	
2024	Vice Mayor of São Luís	PSD	403,981	Elected	
