= Escotet =

Escotet is a surname. Notable people with the surname include:

- Juan Carlos Escotet (born 1959), Spanish-Venezuelan billionaire banker
- Miguel Angel Escotet, Spanish-American social scientist, education administrator, and author

== See also ==
- Escott (disambiguation)
