= Duarte Júnior =

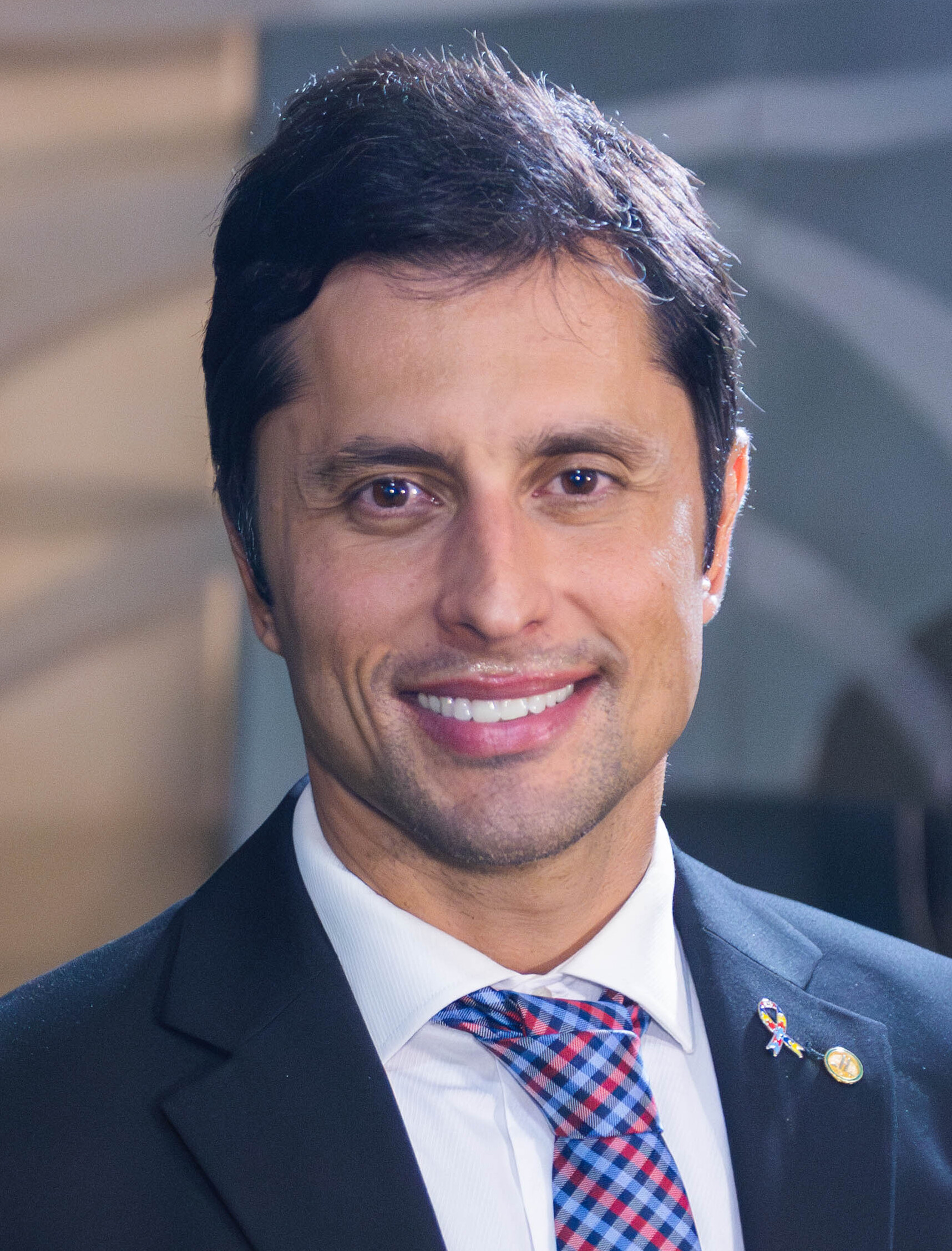
- Duarte Júnior in 2024

Federal deputy of Maranhão
- Incumbent
- Assumed office 1 February 2023

State deputy of Maranhão
- In office 1 February 2019 – 1 February 2023

Personal details
- Born: Hildelis Silva Duarte Junior; 15 September 1986 (age 40) Rio de Janeiro, Brazil
- Party: PCdoB (2013–2020); REPUBLICANOS (2020–2022); PSB (2022–2026); UNIÃO (2022–2026)
- Education: Universidade Ceuma; Universidade Anhanguera; Federal University of Maranhão; Universidade Estadual do Maranhão

Hildelis Silva Duarte Junior, better known as Duarte Júnior (born 15 September 1986), is a Brazilian lawyer, university professor, and politician affiliated with the Brazil Union (UNIÃO). During the 2018 elections, he was elected as a state deputy in the state of Maranhão. In 2022, he became a federal deputy representing the state.

== Biography ==
Duarte Júnior was born on 15 September 1986 in Rio de Janeiro. He moved to São Luís, the capital of the state of Maranhão, where he began his academic and professional life. His parents, Hildélis Duarte and Edna Mazoro, got married in São Luís in 1986 at Igreja de São João Batista on the same road that Duarte Júnior was baptised.

=== As a youth presenter ===
From 2002 to 2004, Duarte Júnior was part of the cast on the local children's program Bianca & Cia, which was presented by his youngest sister, Bruna Bianca Duarte. On the program, he played the role of Choquito, later renamed Xoquitox. The character followed the mold of Chiquinho, played by Edílson Oliveira on programs hosted by Eliana.

Duarte Júnior recorded three tracks on Bianca's first studio album, in the voice of Xoquitox and in his own voice. In response to a Twitter user on his account, he said that he had never been embarrassed playing the character, saying that the money made from the character allowed him to pursue his studies.

== Academic career ==
Duarte Jr graduated with law courses from Universidade Ceuma in 2009, with a specialization in Procedural Civil Rights from Universidade Anhanguera in 2011. He obtained his master in Public Policy from the Federal University of Maranhão (UFMA) in 2016. He has also done post-graduate work in Public Management from the Universidade Estadual do Maranhão (UEMA), which was obtained in 2019. He was a graduate professor in law from Universidade Ceuma.

Afterwards, he became the coordinator and course professor in Consumer Rights at Universidade Ceuma and a visiting professor with the Department of Public Health at the Federal University of Maranhão. In 2019, he was approved in his course selection for a doctorate in Constitutional Rights by the Instituto Brasiliense de Direito Público.

In December 2022, he concluded his doctorate in Constitutional Rights with the thesis "O acesso à Educação Básica para pessoas com deficiência na rede de ensino pública municipal de São Luís/MA".

== Juridical career ==
Duarte Jr is a lawyer who is a member of the Order of Attorneys of Brazil in their Maranhão branch. He taught in higher education and has experience in legal advisory roles with public municipal entities. From 2011 to 2013, he was the coordinator of the Escola Superior de Advocacia of OAB/MA. Since 2013, he is the vice-president of the Commission of the Right to Health of the OAB/MA.

== Political career ==
Duarte Jr has been affiliated with the Communist Party of Brazil (PCdoB) and the Republicans. He is currently affiliated with the PSB. During the 2020 municipal elections, he ran to become mayor of São Luís, going to the second round and losing to Eduardo Braide.

=== Municipality of São Luís ===
In 2013, he was the head of legal council for the Hospital Municipal Djalma Marques.

=== PROCON/VIVA ===
In 2015, Duarte Jr became the president of the Instituto de Proteção e Defesa do Consumidor (Procon) and Viva. His time there lent him great popularity due to the satisfaction of users of the services provided by Procon. In March 2018, he left as president of the institution to run for a vacant seat for the state legislative assembly.

=== Legislative Assembly of Maranhão ===
In 2018, Duarte Jr was elected as a state deputy in the state of Maranhão with 65,144 votes, being the most voted for candidate in the history of São Luís and the third most voted for overall in the state. He supported Flávio Dino's (PCdoB) reelection campaign that year. During his campaign, he stood out for his jovial posture, and was seen as innovative and charismatic. Among his main proposals were the defense of consumer rights, full time education, and the rights of animals.

In 2019, he announced a selective process for the filling of four seats in his cabinet. Duarte Jr was the first state deputy to create a public selection for the positions in the Legislative Assembly. In February of that year, he became the president of the Commission on Human Rights and Minorities and vice-president of the Public Safety Commission.

=== Federal Chamber of Deputies ===
In 2022, Duarte Jr was elected as a federal deputy from Maranhão with 111,019 votes. During his time in office, he became a member of the 8 January CPMI to investigate the 2023 Brazilian Congress attack.

On 24 August 2023, during the 8 January CPMI, federal deputy Abilio Brunini made a gesture with his hand that is associated with neo-Nazi movements in the United States and other countries. He had his microphone cut after a series of interruptions and other disruptive behavior during the speech of Duarte Júnior. After this, he made a gesture that led to accusations of making white supremacist gestures, namely creating a "w" with one hand and a "p" in another. These gestures were allegedly in reference to "white power", specifically to white supremacist and terrorist organizations in the United States such as the Ku Klux Klan. On his X (formerly Twitter) profile, Brunini justified these by claiming he was making references to the length of time of Duarte Júnior's speech. Duarte Júnior had already been interrupted various times by Brunini and that it was to the extent that one of these interruptions led one of the vice-presidents of the CPMI, senator Magno Malta, to become angered and call out Brunini for his behavior.
