= List of state universities in Brazil =

The following is a partial list of state universities in Brazil.

== Alagoas ==
- Universidade Estadual de Alagoas (UNEAL)
- Universidade Estadual de Ciências da Saúde de Alagoas (UNCISAL)

== Amapá ==
- Universidade Estadual do Amapá (UEAP)

== Amazonas ==
- Amazonas State University (UEA)

== Bahia ==
- Bahia State University (UNEB)
- State University of Santa Cruz (UESC)
- State University of Southwestern Bahia (UESB)
- State University of Feira de Santana (UEFS)

== Ceará ==
- Federal University of Ceará (UFC)
- Ceará State University (UECE)
- State University of Vale do Acaraú (UVA)

== Goiás ==
- Goiás State University (UEG)

== Maranhão ==
- Universidade Estadual do Maranhão (UEMA)
- Universidade Estadual da Região Tocantina do Maranhão (UEMASUL)

== Mato Grosso ==
- Mato Grosso State University (UNEMAT)

== Mato Grosso do Sul ==
- Mato Grosso do Sul State University (UEMS)

== Minas Gerais ==
- Minas Gerais State University (UEMG)
- State University of Montes Claros (Unimontes)

== Pará ==
- Pará State University (UEPA)

== Paraíba ==
- Paraíba State University (UEPB)

== Paraná ==
- Londrina State University (UEL)
- Maringa State University (UEM)
- Ponta Grossa State University (UEPG)
- State University of the Centre-West (UNICENTRO)
- University of the State of Paraná (UNESPAR)
- Western Paraná State University (Unioeste)

== Pernambuco ==
- State University of Pernambuco (UPE)

== Piauí ==
- Universidade Estadual do Piauí (UESPI)

== Rio de Janeiro ==
- State University of Northern Rio de Janeiro (UENF)
- Rio de Janeiro State University (UERJ)
- West Zone State University (UEZO)

== Rio Grande do Norte ==
- Universidade do Estado do Rio Grande do Norte (UERN)

== Rio Grande do Sul ==
- Rio Grande do Sul State University (UERGS)

== Santa Catarina ==
- University of the State of Santa Catarina (UDESC)

== São Paulo ==
- São Paulo State Technological Colleges (FATEC)
- São Paulo State University (UNESP)
- State University of Campinas (Unicamp)
- University of São Paulo (USP)

== Tocantins ==
- Universidade Estadual do Tocantins (UNITINS)
