= Juan Carlos Escotet =

Spanish-Venezuelan banker

- Born: Juan Carlos Escotet Rodríguez; 1959 (age 66–67); Madrid, Spain
- Education: Andrés Bello Catholic University; University of Miami (MS)
- Occupation: Banker
- Known for: Founder of Banesco; chairman of Abanca
- Spouse: María Isabel Alviárez
- Children: 3
- Relatives: Miguel Angel Escotet
- Website: http://www.juancarlosescotet.org/

Juan Carlos Escotet Rodríguez (born 1959) is a Spanish-Venezuelan billionaire banker and the founder of Banesco, the largest private financial institution in Venezuela. He is also CEO and shareholder (80 %) of Spanish bank Abanca, as well as president of Spanish football club Deportivo de La Coruña. As of July 2025, his reported net worth is estimated at US$7.8 billion.

== Early life ==
Escotet was born in Madrid, Spain in 1959 as one of eight immigrant children from Spain. He began his work life performing errands for Banco Union in Venezuela in 1976 during which he also attended night school.

He later earned a master's degree in professional management science from the University of Miami School of Business at the University of Miami in Coral Gables, Florida.

== Career ==
After earning his MBA, Escotet worked as an executive for Sociedad Financiera Latinoamericana and then creating his own financial group. In the 1990s, Escotet bought out Venezuelan financial institutions that were then going through a financial and banking crisis. He also set up his own establishment in Panama. Escotet founded Banesco, which is now the largest private financial institution in Venezuela. In 2000, Banco Union was absorbed into Banesco in a merger agreement. He owns other branches in Miami, Panama, Colombia, Curaçao, the Dominican Republic and Puerto Rico.

In 2015, Escotet acquired Spain-based NCG Banco, which was later renamed Abanca.

== Personal life ==
Escotet is married, with three children, and lives in A Coruña, Spain.
