= Escott =

Escott may refer to:

== Places ==
- Escott, Somerset, England, a hamlet in Stogumber parish
- Escott Station, Queensland, Australia

== People with the surname ==
- Beryl E. Escott, Canadian writer about the British WAAF
- Harry Escott (born 1976), English composer
- James Escott (1872–1916), New Zealand politician
- Lucy Escott (1829–1895), American soprano
- Margaret Escott (1908–1977), New Zealand novelist, playwright, poet and drama teacher
- Thomas Hay Sweet Escott (1844–1924), English journalist

== People with the given name ==
- Escott Loney (1903–1982), English cricketer
- Escott Reid (1905–1999), Canadian diplomat
- Herbert Escott Inman, (1860–1915), British children's author

== See also ==
- Sweet-Escott, a surname
- Prouhet–Tarry–Escott problem in mathematics
- Escot (disambiguation)
