= Wellington do Curso =

Brazilian teacher and politician

State deputy from Maranhão
- Incumbent
- Assumed office February 1, 2015

Personal details
- Born: Carlos Wellington de Castro Bezerra; September 27, 1970 (age 55) Teresina, PI
- Party: PSDB (2018-present)
- Other political affiliations: PP (2016-2018); PMB (2015-2016); CIDADANIA (2013-2015); PSL(2009-2013)
- Profession: Teacher

Carlos Wellington de Castro Bezerra (born September 27, 1970) is a Brazilian teacher and politician. He is the founder of the Curso Wellington (founded in October 1995 as Curso do Sargento Wellington) and state deputy (2015–present). Endorsed by Roseana Sarney, Wellington ran the mayor of São Luís, but not was elected. Wellington endorsed Eduardo Braide, also defeated by Edivaldo Holanda Junior.
