= Estadio Riazor =

Stadium in A Coruña, Spain

Abanca-Riazor

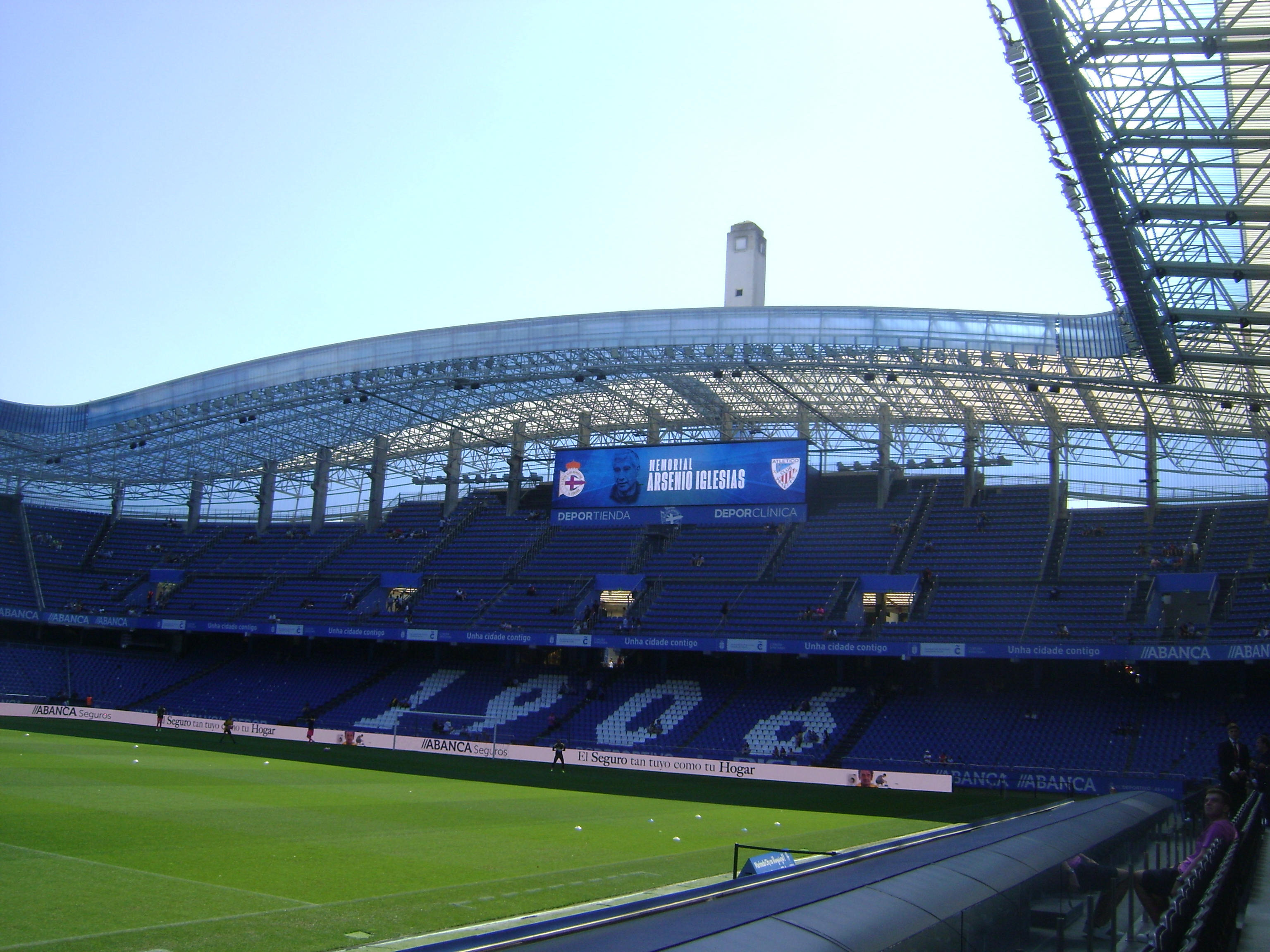
- Estadio Riazor in 2023; UEFA Category 4 stadium
- Interactive map of Abanca-Riazor
- Full name: Estadio Municipal de Riazor
- Location: A Coruña, Spain
- Coordinates: 43.3687°N 8.4175°W
- Owner: Concello da Coruña
- Operator: Deportivo de A Coruña
- Capacity: 32,490
- Surface: Grass
- Field size: 105 m × 68 m (344 ft × 223 ft)

Construction
- Groundbreaking: 1940
- Built: 1940–1944
- Opened: 28 October 1944
- Renovated: 1982, 1995–1998, 2015–2018
- Architect: Santiago Rey Pedreira
- Project manager: José Martín Alonso
- Structural engineer: José Martín Alonso

Tenant
- Deportivo de A Coruña (1944–present)

Estadio Municipal de Riazor (Galician pronunciation: [eʃˈtaðjʊ muniθiˈpal de riaˈθoɾ]), also known as Estadio Abanca-Riazor due to sponsorship reasons, is an all-seater stadium in A Coruña, Galicia, Spain which is the home stadium of Deportivo de A Coruña.

It has a capacity of 32,490, making it the largest stadium in Galicia. It holds the record for the most-attended match in the third tier with 29,079 spectators.

The stadium hosted matches at the 1982 FIFA World Cup and was intended to be one of the venues for the 2030 FIFA World Cup, but the bid was later withdrawn after encountering organizational and administrative difficulties. It has also hosted international friendlies and qualifying matches of the Spain national football team.

== History ==
Although the stadium has hosted home games for Deportivo since its establishment in 1906, it wasn't until 1944 that essential facilities such as stands and changing rooms were installed. The initial field size was 105x74 meters, comparing to current 105x68. That year, the stadium was officially adopted as Deportivo's ground. The opening game was against Valencia on 28 October 1944, which saw Depor lose 3–2. It also hosted the 1947 Copa del Rey final between Real Madrid and Espanyol, which saw the capital's side claim their ninth cup title.

The stadium was renovated in time to host three games during the 1982 FIFA World Cup finals.

On 29 June 2017, the stadium was renamed as Abanca-Riazor after the sign of a sponsorship agreement between Abanca and Deportivo de La Coruña until 2025.

== International matches ==
=== Spain national team matches ===
Date	Opponent	Score	Competition
6 May 1945	Portugal	4–2	Friendly match
23 June 1966	Uruguay	1–1	Friendly match
20 September 1989	Poland	1–0	Friendly match
18 January 1995	Uruguay	2–2	Friendly match
4 September 2009	Belgium	5–0	2010 FIFA World Cup qualification
29 March 2022	Iceland	5–0	Friendly match
4 June 2026	Iraq	1–1	Friendly match

=== 1982 FIFA World Cup ===
The stadium held three matches of Group 1, one of six groups in the group stage of the 1982 FIFA World Cup. The other Group 1 games were also held in Galicia, at Balaídos, Vigo.

15 June 1982	Peru	0–0	Cameroon
17:15 CEST		Report		Attendance: 11,000; Referee: Franz Wöhrer (Austria)

19 June 1982	Poland	0–0	Cameroon
17:15 CEST		Report		Attendance: 19,000; Referee: Alexis Ponnet (Belgium)

22 June 1982	Poland	5–1	Peru
17:15 CEST	Smolarek 55'; Lato 58'; Boniek 61'; Buncol 68'; Ciołek 76'	Report	La Rosa 83'	Attendance: 25,000; Referee: Mario Rubio Vázquez (Mexico)

== See also ==
- List of stadiums in Spain
- Lists of stadiums
