= Codó =

- Municipality
- Município de Codó; Municipality of Codó
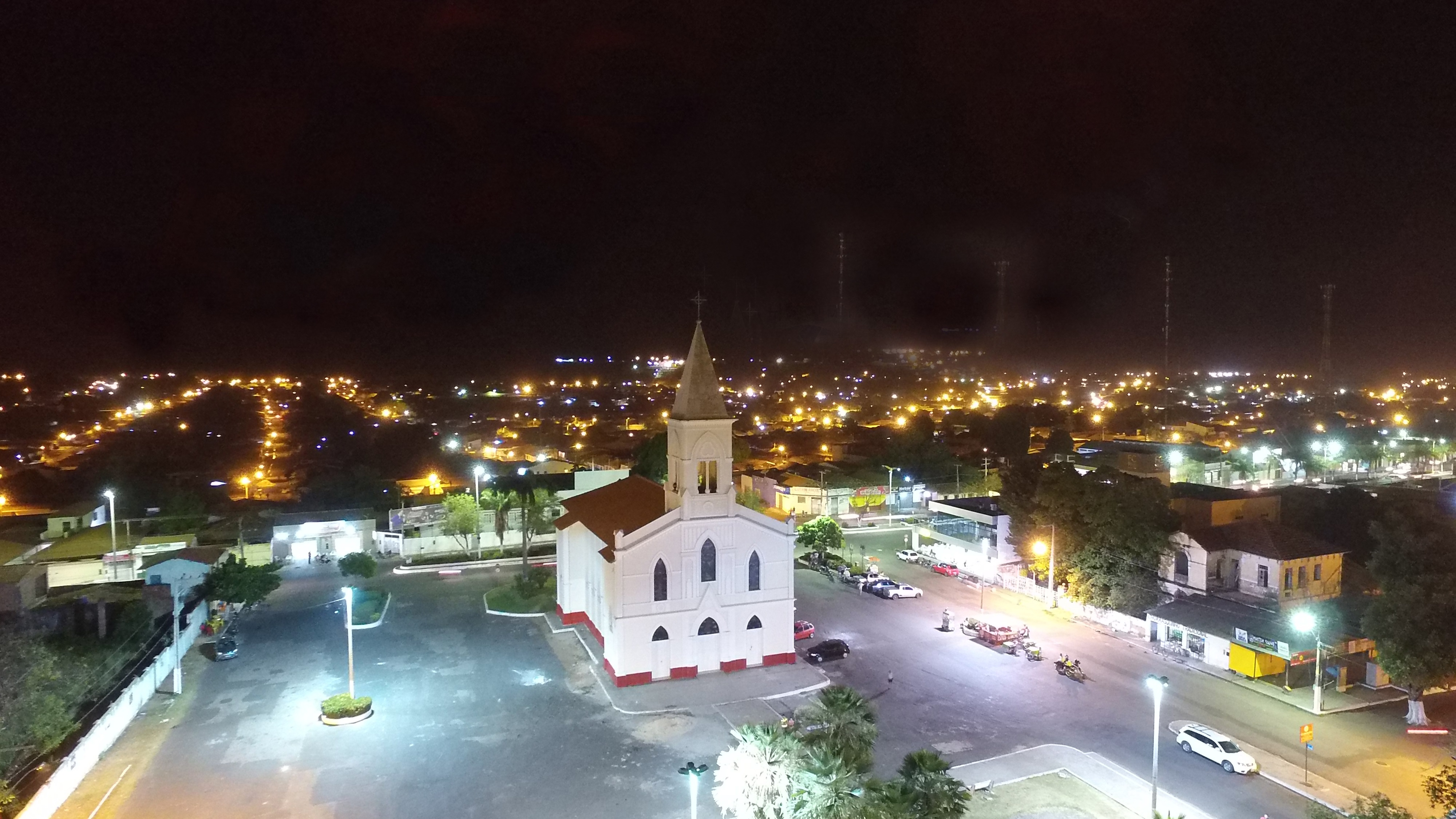
- Church of São Sebastião

- Flag Coat of arms
- Nicknames: "Cidade de Deus" "Princesa do Vale do Itapecuru" "Centro da Região dos Cocais"
- Location in Maranhão state

- Location in Brazil
- Coordinates: 4°27′18″S 43°53′9″W
- Country: Brazil
- Region: Northeast
- State: Maranhão
- Founded: 16 April 1896

Government
  - Type: Mayor-council
  - Mayor: José Francisco (PSD)

Area
  - Total: 4,361.344 km^{2} (1,683.924 sq mi)
- Elevation: 47 m (154 ft)

Population (2022 Census)
  - Total: 114,269
  - Estimate (2025): 118,283
  - Density: 26.2004/km^{2} (67.8587/sq mi)
- Demonym: codoense
- Time zone: UTC−3 (BRT)
- Postal code: 65 400-000
- Area code: +55 99
- HDI: 0.595
- Website: http://www.codo.ma.gov.br/

Codó is a city in the state of Maranhão, Brazil. It has an estimated population of 114,269 (2022 Census) and an area of 4,361.344 km^{2}. Therefore, the sixth most populous municipality in the state. It has the largest concentration of religious centers of African origin in Brazil, with 400 terreiros.

== Geography ==
Codó is situated in the northeastern Brazil, in eastern Maranhão. The city intersects with the BR-316 road and São Luís-Teresina railway, which serves as the main port of distribution of goods, such as fuels, cement and pig iron. despite being located in the state of Maranhão, it is much more connected to the state capital of Teresina due to its proximity of only 169 kilometers. The average land elevation is approximately 47 m above sea level, the predominant climate is tropical. UTC−3 time zone. It is also located in the Maranhão Babaçu Forest region (região dos cocais), in the Itapecuru Valley. The Codó watershed is made up of the Itapecuru River, its important affluent, the Codozinho River, which has the Saco River as its affluent.

== Tourism ==
Carnival is the biggest party, which attracts people from neighboring cities, such as Teresina and São Luís. It is also famous for its off-season carnivals, such as Cornofolia, Tsunami, Vivo Bebu, etc. The Festa Junina and Afro-religious (terecô) celebrations, such as those of the Umbanda master Bita do Barão in August, attracts countless people, from other Brazilian states and even tourists from other countries.

== Education ==
Portuguese is the official national language, and thus the primary language taught in schools. But English and Spanish are part of the official high school curriculum.

Educational institutions include:

- Universidade Federal do Maranhão (UFMA)
- Universidade Estadual do Maranhão (UEMA)
- Instituto Federal de Educação, Ciência e tecnologia do Maranhão (IFMA)
- Instituto Estadual de Educação, Ciência e Tecnologia do Maranhão (IEMA)

== Notable people ==
- Marcos Pimentel (born 1983), footballer
