= Carmela Arias y Díaz de Rábago =

First woman president of a bank in Spain

- Born: Carmela Arias y Díaz; 20 February 1920; A Coruña, Spain
- Died: 27 October 2009 (aged 89); A Coruña, Spain
- Occupation: Banker
- Known for: First woman president of a bank in Spain
- Spouse: Pedro Barrié de la Maza y Pastor
- Parents: Vicente Arias de la Maza (father); Carmela Díaz de Rábago y Aguiar (mother)

Carmela Arias y Díaz de Rábago (20 February 1920 – 27 October 2009) was a Spanish banker who, in 1971, became the first woman president of a bank in Spain, a post she held for 30 years. She also became known as Countess of Fenosa.

== Biography ==
Arias was born in A Coruña, a city and municipality of Galicia, Spain. Her parents were Carmela Díaz de Rábago y Aguiar and Vicente Arias de la Maza, who was the grandson of Don Pedro de Agar y Bustillo, regent of Spain in the Courts of Cádiz. She attended high school in Barcelona.

After the end of the Spanish Civil War (1936–1939), Arias enrolled in the Barcelona School of Architecture, but her studies there were abruptly halted when she contracted a serious lung-related disease that lasted for about 20 years, which was finally cured after surgery in Stockholm, Sweden, in 1953.

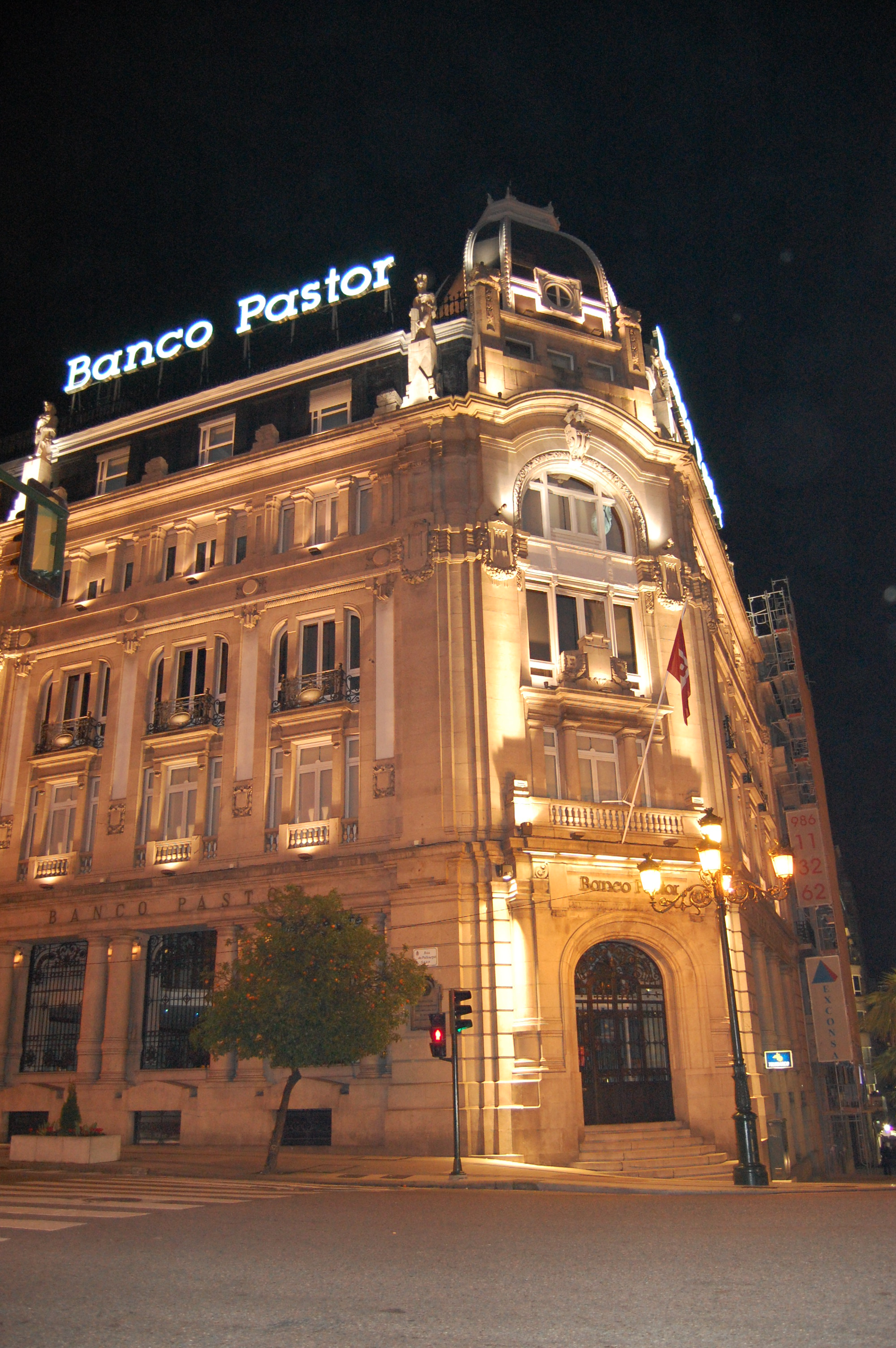
Main branch of Banco Pastor in Vigo, Galicia, Spain

Arias married Pedro Barrié de la Maza y Pastor, Count of Fenosa and her father's first cousin, in December 1966. After her husband's death, in 1971, Arias inherited the title Countess of Fenosa and assumed the presidencies of the Banco Pastor (with headquarters in A Coruña) as well as the Pedro Barrié de la Maza Foundation, two organizations for which she was already serving as vice president. She remained president of both organizations for 30 years.

Arias also served as honorary president of the energy company Unión Fenosa, and in January 1992 she was appointed vice president and member of the company's delegate committee. Just one month later, on 15 February, she witnessed the culmination of a collaboration agreement between the Xunta de Galicia and her bank, resulting in creation of a development fund to promote large business projects in her home region of Galicia, Spain.

Arias resigned as president of Banco Pastor in 2001, citing her advancing age. She was succeeded there by her nephew, but she remained a director of the bank and was named its honorary president.

Arias died at her home on 27 October 2009 in A Coruña at the age of 89. She had no children. In her will, she designated almost all of her substantial personal fortune, with the exception of her family's houses, were to go to the Pedro Barrié de la Maza Foundation.

== Selected other positions ==
- President, governing board of the Juana de Vega Board of Trustees
- Honorary member of the World Organization for Preschool Education
- Member, Royal Board of Education

== Selected honors ==
Arias was named Doctor Honoris Causa by the University of La Coruña in 1991.

- The Castelao Medal of the Xunta de Galicia, 1989
- Gold Badge of the Red Cross
- Galician of the Year, 1996
- Gold Medal from the University of Galicia, 1982
- Gold Medal from the Royal Academy of Arts of San Fernando, 1989
- Grand Cross of the Civil Order of Charity
- Gold Medal of the Spanish Association for the Fight against Cancer
- Gold Medal of the Chamber of Commerce of La Coruña
- Gold Badge of the Albéniz Musical Group
- Cross 'Pro Ecclesia et Pontifice'
