= Goiás State University =

University in Goiás, Brazil

- Universidade Estadual de Goiás
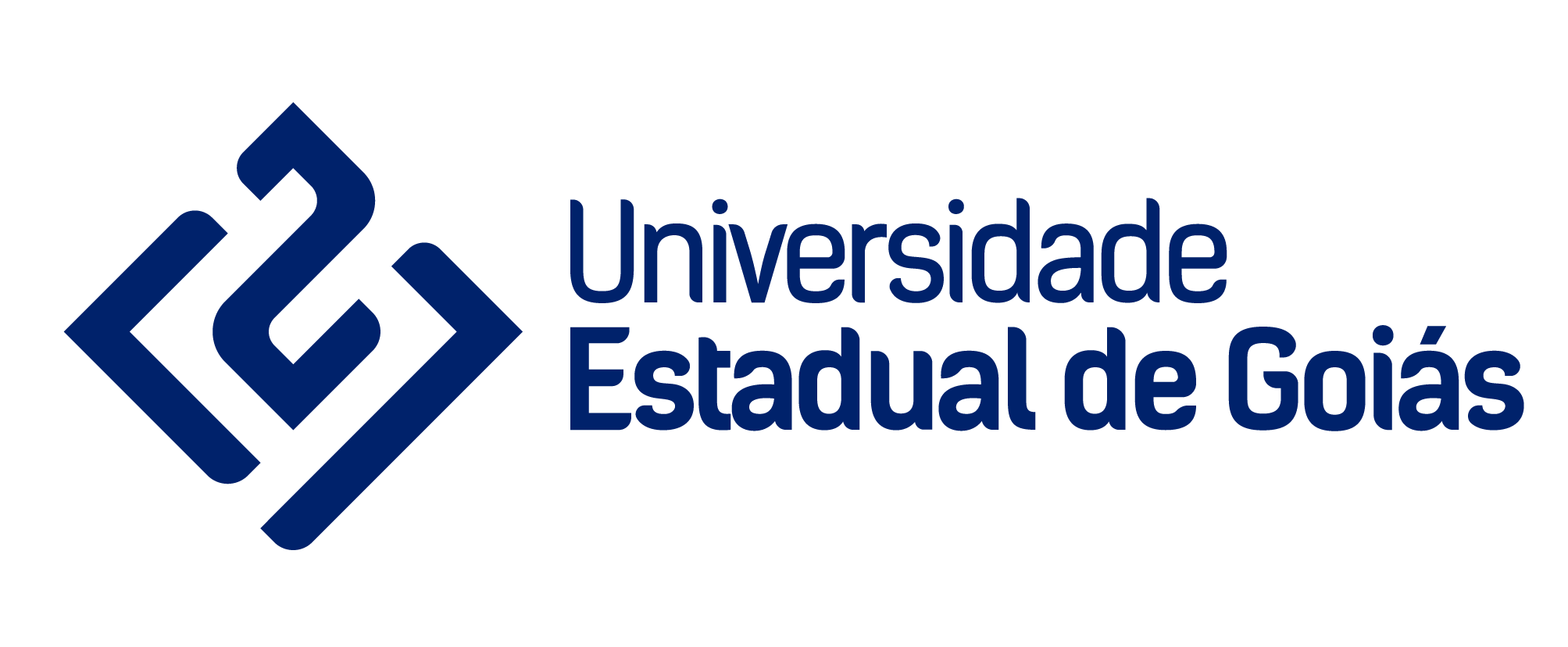
- Other name: UEG
- Type: Public University
- Established: 1999
- Rector: Valter Gomes Campos
- Undergraduates: 17,158 (2016)
- Location: Anápolis (Headquarter), Goiás, Brazil
- Campus: Urban
- Website: www.ueg.br

The State University of Goiás (Portuguese: Universidade Estadual de Goiás, UEG) is a publicly funded university located in the Brazilian state of Goiás, headed in Anápolis and with campuses in 42 cities. The university was founded in 1999, and it's one of the 3 public universities of Goiás (besides the Federal University of Goiás, and Rio Verde University).

== See also ==
- List of state universities in Brazil
