= West Zone State University =

A public university of the State of Rio de Janeiro

- Centro Universitário Estadual da Zona Oeste
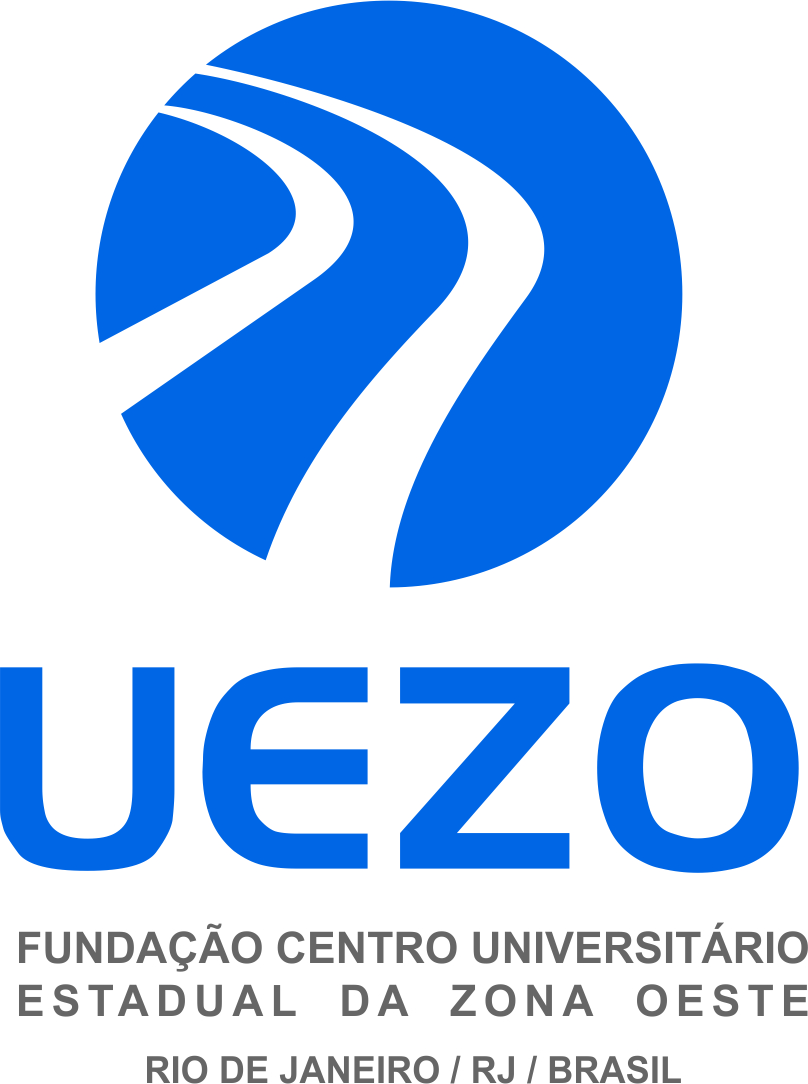
- Other name: UEZO
- Active: 2005–2022
- Students: 2.000 (Last active period)
- Location: Campo Grande, Rio de Janeiro, Brazil; 22.9007°S 43.5788°W
- Website: www.uezo.rj.gov.br

The West Zone State University (Portuguese: Centro Universitário Estadual da Zona Oeste, UEZO) was a public university of the State of Rio de Janeiro, legally created in 2002 and inaugurated in 2005. Since 2022, it has been integrated into the State University of Rio de Janeiro (UERJ). Since then, the UEZO campus has been referred to as UERJ West Zone (UERJ-ZO).

The university was created with the purpose of meeting the demand of students from the West Zone of Rio de Janeiro, and municipalities such as Itaguaí and Nova Iguaçu, and expanding the technological and economic development of such regions.

On March 22, 2022, UEZO was absorbed by the State University of Rio de Janeiro (UERJ), making the former university headquarters in Campo Grande the new UERJ West Zone campus (UERJ-ZO).

== See also ==
- List of state universities in Brazil
