= Marcos Pimentel =

Brazilian footballer

Personal information
- Full name: Marcos Valerio Morais Viana
- Date of birth: 26 August 1983 (age 43)
- Place of birth: Codó, Brazil
- Height: 1.70 m (5 ft 7 in)
- Position: Right-back

Senior career*
Years	Team	Apps	(Gls)
2005	Icasa		
2007–2011	Ferroviário		
2008–2009	→ Ceará (loan)		
2010	→ Grêmio Prudente (loan)		
2010	→ Vitória (loan)		
2010–2011	→ Ceará (loan)		
2007–2011	Ferroviário		
2011–2012	Guarani de Juazeiro		
2011	→ Atlético Paranaense (loan)		
2011	→ Portuguesa (loan)		
2012	→ Grêmio Barueri (loan)		
2012	Grêmio Barueri		
2012–2013	Santa Cruz		
2014	Comercial		
2015–?	Altos		
- * Club domestic league appearances and goals

Marcos Valerio Morais Viana, better known as Marcos Pimentel (Codó, 26 August 1983) is a Brazilian former professional footballer who played as a right-back.

== Career statistics ==
(Correct as of 16 October 2010)

Club	Season	State League		Brazilian Série A		Copa do Brasil		Copa Libertadores		Copa Sudamericana		Total	
Club	Season	Apps	Goals	Apps	Goals	Apps	Goals	Apps	Goals	Apps	Goals	Apps	Goals
Grêmio Prudente (loan)	2010	6	0	17	1	-	-	-	-	-	-	23	1
Vitória (loan)	2010	7	0	-	-	-	-	-	-	-	-	7	0
Ceará (loan)	2010	-	-	1	0	-	-	-	-	-	-	1	0
Total		13	0	18	1	-	-	-	-	-	-	31	1
