= Escot =

Escot may refer to:

- Escot, Pyrénées-Atlantiques, France
- Escot, Talaton, England

== People with the surname ==
- Hagre l'Escot (fl. 1360s), Scottish mercenary captain
- Pozzi Escot (born 1933), Peruvian musician

== See also ==
- Ascot (disambiguation)
- Escott (disambiguation)
