= Miguel Angel Escotet =

Miguel Ángel Escotet
- Miguel Ángel Escotet
- Born: León, Spain
- Occupations: Psychologist and University Professor

Academic background
- Education: University of Nebraska–Lincoln
- Thesis: The measurement of student problems: a cross-cultural study in five nations (1972)

Academic work
- Discipline: Psychology
- Sub-discipline: Research Methodology
- Institutions: University of Texas at Brownsville; Florida International University
- Website: miguelescotet.com

Miguel Angel Escotet is a social scientist, education administrator and author, emeritus professor at the University of Texas at Brownsville, of which he was dean of the College of Education. He was also secretary general of Organización de Estados Iberoamericanos and professor at Florida International University. He is since 2014 director general of corporate social responsibility of Abanca. He is also president of Fundación Galicia Obra Social, Afundación, and president of IESIDE, Afundacion's business school.

== Early life and education ==
Escotet was born in León, Spain and spent his childhood and teenage years in Gijón. He started studies of engineering at Universidad Politécnica de Madrid, which he continued at Universidad del Zulia in Venezuela, before graduating in clinical psychology from Universidad Javeriana in Colombia. In the United States, he obtained an M.A. in psychology and higher education management from the University of Texas at Austin and a Ph.D. from the University of Nebraska–Lincoln, specializing in comparative education and cross-cultural psychology.

== Academic and professional career ==
After earning his PhD in 1972, Escotet became associate professor of psychology at Fort Lewis College, which he left in 1974 to become director general and undersecretary at the ministry of education of Venezuela. He left this position in 1976 to become a founder of Universidad Nacional Abierta, Venezuela's open university, in which he was the provost until 1979, while he also was a professor at Universidad Simón Bolívar. In 1981 he joined Florida International University, where he stayed as professor of research and director of a research center until 1983. He left FIU to become secretary general of Organización de Estados Iberoamericanos in Madrid, a position he held for four years (1983-1987). Between 1987 and 1991 Escotet was rector of Universidad Iberoamericana de Posgrado in Salamanca, after which he became special advisor in higher education and research to the secretary general of UNESCO in Paris. In 1993, Escotet returned to Florida International University, where he was director of the International Institute of Development Education and was appointed Frost professor in 2001. He left FIU in 2004 to become dean of graduate studies at Universidad de Deusto, a private Jesuit university in Spain for four years. Escotet also held the UNESCO Mobile Chair in University History and Future created in 1997 at United Nations University and Universidad de Palermo. In 2008, Escotet joined the University of Texas at Brownsville, where he was dean of the College of Education and from which he retired as emeritus professor in 2014.

Miguel A. Escotet served as a member of UNESCO's advisory committee for higher education in Latin America and the Caribbean for fifteen years. He was also a consultant to the World Bank, Inter-American Development Bank, United Nations Development Program, OECD, European Union, Organization of American States, USAID, UNESCO, as well as many academic institutions in different countries. He was also member of the boards of different academic and professional organizations, and member of the editorial boards of international academic journals and book series.

== Awards and distinctions ==
Escotet received an honorary doctorate from Universidade Federal do Maranhao in Brazil and a number of other awards and international distinctions for his scientific contribution in Europe, the United States and Latin America. He is a Life Status Member of the American Psychological Association (APA).

== Selected works ==
Escotet is the author of a large number of publications, which have focused mostly on higher education reforms and innovation in Latin America and Europe, and on the development of research methodology in cross-cultural psychology and transnational studies.

- Escotet, Miguel A (1965). Cuestionario Investigativo de la Personalidad - CIP (Personality Research Questionnaire) (15th editions). Barranquilla, Mexico: Ediciones Psicopedagógicas Latinoamericanas/ El Manual Moderno.
- Escotet, Miguel A (1967). El Mundo de la percepción (The World of Perception). Cumaná, Venezuela: Ediciones UDO.
- Escotet, Miguel A (1971). Psicología del aprendizaje (Psychology of Learning). Cumaná, Venezuela: Ediciones UDO.
- Escotet, Miguel A (1975). Costos de la educación superior (Costs of Higher Education). Caracas, Venezuela: Publicaciones del Ministerio de Educación. Unknown ID 1078262I9.
- Escotet, Miguel A (1980). Diseño multivariado en psicología y educación (Multivariate Design in Psychology and Education). Barcelona, Spain: Ediciones CEAC. ISBN 978-84-88040-00-8.
- Escotet, Miguel A (1980). Tendencias de la educación superior a distancia (Tendencies of Distance Higher Education). San José, Costa Rica: Universidad Nacional de Educación a Distancia. Unknown ID 3784E74t2.
- Escotet, Miguel A; R. Serpell (1981). Influencia de la cultura en el comportamiento (Cultural Influence on Behavior). Barcelona: Ediciones CEAC. ISBN 84-329-8704-2.
- Escotet, Miguel A (1984). Técnicas de evaluación institucional en la educación superior (Techniques of Institutional Evaluation in Higher Education). Madrid: Ediciones de Ministerio de Educación y Ciencia. ISBN 84-369-1147-4.
- Escotet, Miguel A (1985). Estadística Psicoeducativa (Statistics for Psychology and Education) (5th ed.). Mexico: Trillas. ISBN 968-24-0276-X.
- Escotet, Miguel A (1987). Los modelos matemáticos de aprendizaje (Mathematical Models of Learning). Madrid: Ediciones OEI. ISBN 84-7666-060-X.
- Escotet, Miguel A (1987). Nuevos Horizontes para la OEI (New Horizons for the OEI). Madrid: Ediciones OEI, Organization of Iberoamerican States. ISBN 84-7666-065-0.
- Escotet, Miguel A (1989). Cross-Cultural Research Methodology in Education. Miami: Nabe. ISBN 84-86168-86-4.
- Escotet, Miguel A; Albornoz, Orlando (1989). Educación y desarrollo desde la perspectiva sociológica (Education and Development from the Sociological Perspective). Salamanca, Spain: Ediciones UIP, Universidad Iberoaméricana de Posgrado. ISBN 9788486168469. OCLC 20850771.
- Escotet, Miguel A (1990). Evaluación institucional universitaria (Institutional Evaluation of the University). Buenos Aires: Editorial Losada. ISBN 950-03-8370-5.
- Escotet, Miguel A. (1991). La educación como paradigma transcultural (The transcultural education paradigm). Madrid: Fundación Ciencia, Democracia y Sociedad. ISBN 978-84-88040-00-8.
- Escotet, Miguel A.; Arrien, J.B.; Eicher, J.C.; Filella, J.; Husen, T.; Kolvenbach, P.; Mayor, F.; Psachapopoulos, Reimers, F.; Saha, L.; Serrano, A.; Tunnermann, C. (1992). Universidad y Crisis (University and Crisis). Managua: Editorial UCA. Unknown ID 3781U58.
- Escotet, Miguel A. (1992). Aprender para el futuro (Learning for the Future). Madrid: Alianza Editorial. ISBN 84-206-2705-4.
- Escotet, Miguel A (1993). Trends, Missions and Policies of the University. Paris & Managua: UNESCO/UCA.
- Escotet, Miguel A (2000) [1997]. Cultural and Social Foundations of Education: An Interdisciplinary Approach, 2nd edition. Needham Heights, Massachusetts: Simon & Schuster. ISBN 0-536-59634-4.
- Escotet, Miguel A (1997). Universidad and Devenir (University and Becoming). Buenos Aires: Editorial Lugar. ISBN 950-892-027-0.
- Escotet, Miguel A (1998). Manual de auto-evaluación de la universidad (Handbook of University Self-Evaluation). Bogotá: Editorial Universidad de los Andes/UNESCO. ISBN 958-9057-96-9.
- Escotet, Miguel A, ed. (2004). The Psychosocial and Cultural Nature of Education. Boston: Pearson. ISBN 0-536-84455-0.
- Escotet, Miguel A; Villa, A; Goñi, J. (2007). Modelo de Innovación en Educación Superior (Model of Innovation in Higher Education). Bilbao, Spain: Ediciones Mensajero. ISBN 978-84-271-2886-6.
- Escotet, Miguel A; Aiello, M; Sheepshanks, V. (2010). La Actividad Científica en la Universidad (The Scientific Activity in the University). Buenos Aires: U. Palermo/UNESCO-UNU. ISBN 978-987-1716-19-7.
- Escotet, Miguel A (2017). Análisis Multivariado en Ciencias Humanas (Multivariate Analysis in Human Sciences). Miami: TransCampus. ISBN 978-84-617-7678-8.
