= Banco Pastor =

Banco Popular Pastor, S.A.
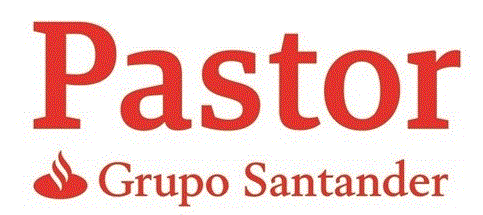
- Type: Sociedad Anónima
- Traded as: BMAD: PAS
- Industry: Financial services
- Predecessor: Jaime Dalmau y Cía
- Founded: 1776 A Coruña, Spain (1776)
- Founder: Jaime Dalmau Batista
- Defunct: 2011
- Fate: Taken over by Banco Popular Español
- Headquarters: A Coruña, Spain
- Number of locations: 558 branches
- Area served: Nationwide
- Key people: José María Arias Mosquera (CEO)
- Products: Banking, insurance, asset management
- Services: Commercial banking, Corporate banking
- Number of employees: 4,035 (2005)
- Parent: Santander Group
- Website: www.bancopastor.es

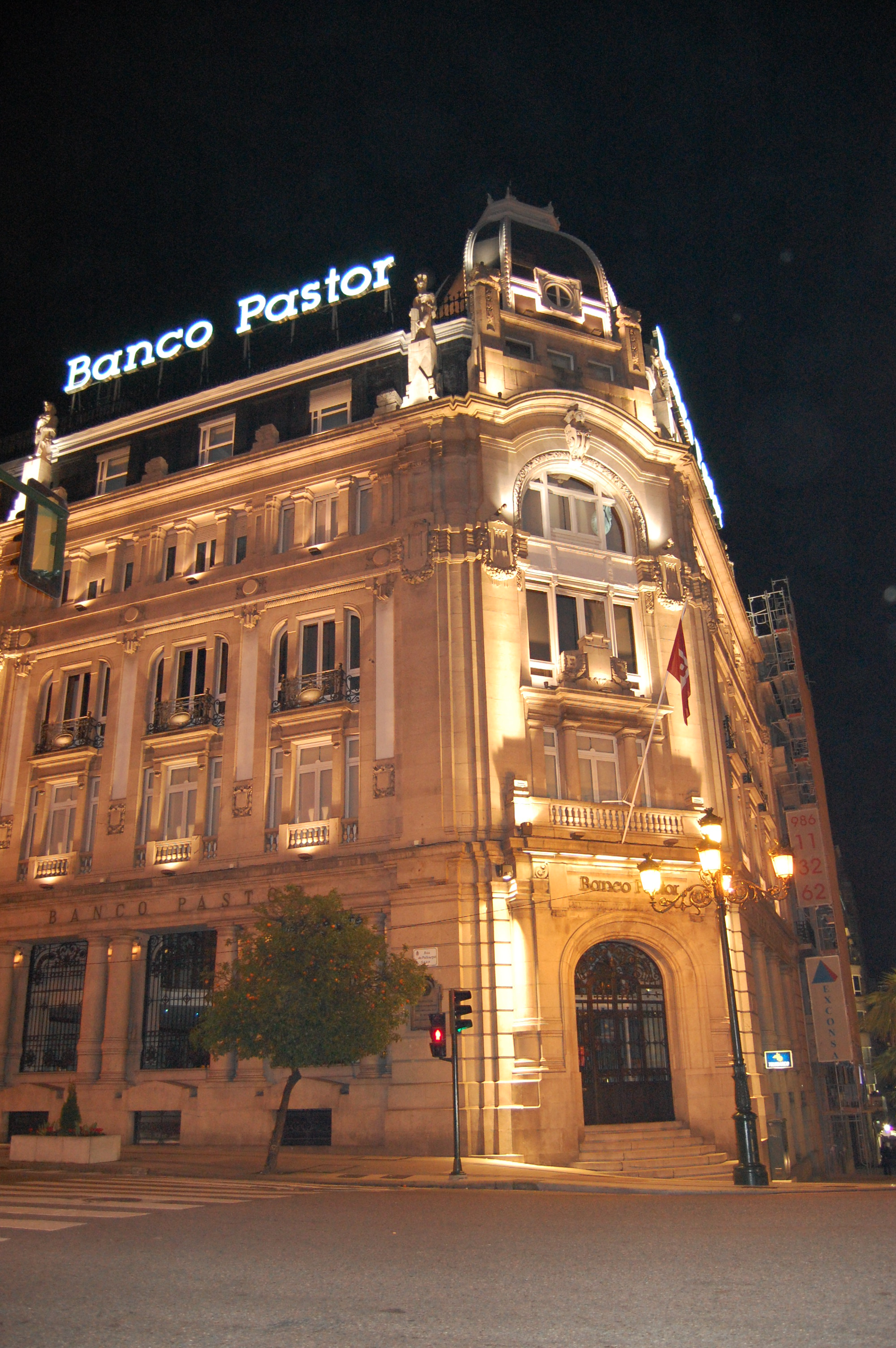
Main branch of the bank in Vigo.

Banco Popular Pastor, S.A. was a Spanish bank. It was the second oldest banking institution in the country, after Banco Etcheverría. It failed the European stress test in 2011 as a result of the 2008 financial crisis and was taken over by Banco Popular Español, which would later become Santander Bank.

The bank's main business activity was commercial banking, corporate banking, Internet and telephone banking, and treasury and capital markets. The bank had 4,035 employees as of 2005, 555 branches in Spain and 3 abroad.

== History ==
Founded in 1776 by Jaime Dalmau Batista as Jaime Dalmau y Cía (Jaime Dalmau and Company), who had a shipping company operating between the port of A Coruña and several American ports. Galician emigrants used to send their savings back to Galicia through the shipping company, hence the need to manage all that capital.

In 1819 José Pastor Taxonera became a partner in the company, and soon took control of the business. He bought it in 1845 and changed its name to José Pastor. The business was passed down through generations of his descendants, changing its name to Pastor Hermanos, José Pastor y Cía. and Sobrinos de José Pastor successively until 1925, when it became Banco Pastor and became a Sociedad Anónima.

In 1939, Pedro Barrié de la Maza (one of the principal economic backers of General Franco's coup d'état received an economic tzar position in Galicia in exchange for his support) took full control of the bank and use it as a supporter of Galician business network control. At a national level it cooperated with Astano, Renfe and Fenosa, founded in 1943 by Barrié de la Maza. In 1971, following Barrié de la Maza's death, his widow Carmela Arias y Díaz de Rábago was appointed executive president of the bank, being the first woman to become president of a bank in Spain. In September 2001 she was succeeded by José María Arias Mosquera.

In 2011, due to the effects of the 2008 financial crisis, Banco Pastor was one of the few banks that failed the European stress test. On October 10, an agreement was reached for a takeover by Banco Popular, but to be continued to be run as a separate entity.

== See also ==
- List of banks in Spain
