= Universidade Estadual do Maranhão =

Public university in Maranhão, Brazil

State University of Maranhão
- Universidade Estadual do Maranhão
- Other name: UEMA
- Motto: scientia ad vitam(Latin for Science for Life)
- Type: Public university
- Established: Dez 30, 1981
- Affiliations: ABRUEM, RENEX
- Budget: R$ 209.886.197,36 (2014)
- Rector: Prof. Walter Canales
- Students: 23,518 (2015)
- Location: São Luís, Maranhão, Brazil; 2.5790232°S 44.2090497°W
- Campus: Urban
- Website: www.uema.br

Universidade Estadual do Maranhão (UEMA, English: State University of Maranhão) is a public state university in the state of Maranhão, Brazil. It was founded on Dezember 30, 1981, and is based in São Luís. In addition to the Universidade Federal do Maranhão (UFMA), it was the second university in the state. In September 2016, part of it was dismembered for creation of a third, the newly founded Universidade Estadual da Região Tocantina do Maranhão (UEMASUL). With more than 20 thousand students, the institution has 22 campuses and 25 university centers. In the university ranking, it ranks 157th in Brazil. The university rector is Walter Canales Sant' Ana.

== History ==
UEMA had its origin in the Federation of Higher Schools of Maranhão (Federação das Escolas Superiores do Maranhão – FESM), created by Law 3,260, of August 22, 1972, to coordinate and integrate students from Maranhão higher education system. FESM, initially, was created by four higher education units: School of Administration, School of Engineering, School of Agronomy and Faculty of Caxias. In 1975, FESM incorporated the São Luís School of Veterinary Medicine and, in 1979, the Faculty of Education of Operators.

An FESM was transformed into the State University of Maranhão – UEMA, through Law No. 4,400, of December 30, 1981, and its operation was authorized by Federal Decree No. 94,143, of March 25, 1987, as a special regime Autarchy, legal entity of public law, in the multicampi modality. Initially, UEMA has three fields and seven teaching units:

- Basic Studies Unit;
- Engineering Studies Unit;
- Administration Studies Unit;
- Agronomy Studies Unit;
- Veterinary Medicine Studies Unit;
- Caxias Education Studies Unit;
- Imperatriz Education Studies Unit

UEMA was subsequently reorganized by Laws 5,921, of March 15, 1994, and 5,931, of April 22, 1994, amended by Law 6,663, of June 4, 1996. In principle, UEMA was linked to the State Secretariat of Education. After the administrative reform implemented by the State Government in 1999, SEDUC was transformed into the Human Development State Management – GDH.

UEMA was separated from the GDH by State Law No. 7,734, dated April 19, 2002, which provided for new changes in the Government's administrative structure, and became part of the State Planning and Management Department.

On January 31, 2003, with Law No. 7,844, the State underwent a new structural reorganization. The State System for Scientific and Technological Development was created, of which UEMA became part, and the university started to be linked to the State Management of Science, Technology, Higher Education and Technological Development – GECTEC, today, Secretary of State of Science, Technology, Higher Education and Technological Development – SECTECz

The UEMA offers several special programs, including:

1. Programa Ensinar de Formação de Professores (Ensinar Teacher Training Program): Aims to train teachers for basic education by integrating specific, interdisciplinary, and pedagogical knowledge. It also focuses on developing ethical, linguistic, aesthetic, and political values through a dialogue between different worldviews.
2. Programa de Formação Profissional Tecnológica - ProfiTec (Professional Technological Training Program): Launched in 2019, its mission is to include and train the youth of Maranhão through technology courses, addressing specific social demands, promoting technological and professional progress, and spreading knowledge for citizenship and sustainable development.
3. Programa de Formação Docente para a Diversidade Étnica no Maranhão- Proetnos (Teacher Training Program for Ethnic Diversity in Maranhão): Created in 2016, it aims to train teachers from traditional communities, such as indigenous peoples, quilombolas, coconut breakers, and riverine populations, enabling them to lead the schooling processes in their communities.

Additionally, UEMA has the Núcleo de Tecnologias para Educação -UemaNet (Educational Technologies Center), which is responsible for managing undergraduate, postgraduate, and distance learning qualification courses, as well as developing tools and projects to support the university's face-to-face education.

UemaNet also offers the Plataforma Eskada (Eskada platform), which provides open online courses with certification issued by UEMA. The courses are free, 100% online, and accessible to everyone without minimum education requirements, allowing students to adapt their study schedule according to their availability.

== Campi ==
With its main campus in its own Cidade Universitária Paulo VI , the university maintains 19 training and study centers scattered across the state:

- Bacabal: Campus Bacabal
- Balsas: Campus Balsas
- Barra do Corda: Campus Barra do Corda
- Caxias: Campus Caxias
- Codó: Campus Codó
- Coelho Neto: Campus Coelho Neto
- Colinas: Campus Colinas
- Coroatá: Campus Coroatá
- Grajaú: Campus Grajaú
- Itapecuru Mirim: Campus Itapecuru Mirim
- Lago da Pedra: Campus Lago da Pedra
- Pedreiras: Campus Pedreiras
- Pinheiro: Campus Pinheiro
- Presidente Dutra: Campus Presidente Dutra
- São Bento: Campus São Bento
- Santa Inês: Campus Santa Inês
- São João dos Patos: Campus São João dos Patos
- São Luís: Centro de Ciências Agrárias – CCA, Centro de Ciências Sociais Applicadas – CCSA, Centro de Educação, Ciências Exatas e Naturais – CECEN, Centro de Ciências Tecnológicas – CCT
- Timon: Campus Timon
- Zé Doca: Campus Zé Doca

== Libraries ==
The central library of the library network is in São Luís, the library system had a total of 61,598 different monographs, 4,500 electronic publications and around 1,400 journals in 2018.

== Publications ==
Current publications: Anuário

- Universidade Estadual do Maranhão: Anuário. São Luís 2018 (PDF, 23,1 MB; Brazilian Portuguese).
- Revista Uema (Uema Journal): Revista Uema
- Jornal Uema (Uema newspaper): Jornal Uema

== See also ==
- List of state universities in Brazil
- Rankings of Universities in Brazil
- Universidade Federal do Maranhão
- Education in State of Maranhão
