= State University of Vale do Acaraú =

Public University in the brazilian northeastern state of Ceará

UVA
- Universidade Estadual do Vale do Acaraú
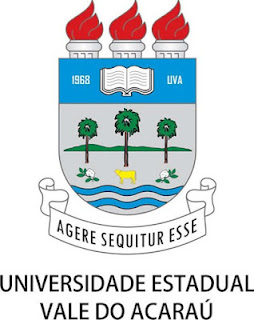
- Motto: Agere Sequitur Esse
- Type: Public
- Established: 1968
- Location: Sobral, Ceará, Brazil

The Acaraú Valley State University (Portuguese: Universidade Estadual do Vale do Acaraú, UVA) is a state-operated university located in Sobral, Ceará, Brazil.

== See also ==
- List of state universities in Brazil
