= Bita do Barão =

- Born: Wilson Nonato de Sousa; July 10, 1932; Codó, Maranhão, Brazil
- Died: April 18, 2019 (aged 86); Teresina, Piauí, Brazil
- Occupation: Pai-de-santo

Wilson Nonato de Sousa, popularly known as Mestre Bita do Barão de Guaré, was a renowned Maranhão-based pai-de-santo (spiritual leader), head of the Terecô tradition (a local branch of Umbanda), and a prominent figure in Brazil's religious landscape. Revered as one of the country's most influential and esteemed pais-de-santo, he led for decades the main house of worship in Codó, Maranhão. He was famously a spiritual counselor to members of the political elite, particularly the Sarney family, and received official honors for his cultural contributions.

== Biography ==
=== Origins and early years ===
Wilson Nonato de Sousa was born in Codó, in the interior of Maranhão state, the son of Cirilo Bispo de Sousa and Olívia Ferreira de Sousa. Although studies indicate June 10, 1932, as his date of birth, his childhood and adolescence were marked by an atmosphere of mystery and Afro-Brazilian traditions in the village of Santo Antônio dos Pretos, a rural community with a strong Black presence where he grew up.

From an early age, his restless temperament earned him the nickname "Bita," inspired by the constant energy of a goat—a name that would stay with him for life. His first spiritual manifestations came early: at five years old, he claimed to incorporate the spirit of Barão de Guaré, an entity that would become his main religious guide. Later, he would describe these moments as intense and enchanting visions, experienced at a time when, in his words, he "knew nothing."

During his teenage years, his mediumistic gift began to draw attention beyond the village. A locally famous episode recounts that Bita, still young, supposedly solved a crime through spiritual incorporation, revealing details the police had not uncovered. In his early years, he did not charge for consultations, receiving only spontaneous offerings such as jewelry and food.

By the end of his adolescence, Bita had begun to form his first disciples, initiating at least two filhas-de-santo and teaching them the fundamentals of Afro-Brazilian religions. This early period of his trajectory shows that, beyond leading rituals, he also assumed an active role in the religious formation of others from a young age, establishing himself as a reference figure in the community.

=== Career as a pai-de-santo and influence ===
In the 1940s and 1950s, Bita do Barão expanded his practice by incorporating elements of Umbanda and Candomblé, adapting rituals to the local context of Codó. This synthesis attracted a growing following and led to the official registration of his Umbanda Tenda. In 1954, he founded the Tenda Espírita de Umbanda Rainha Iemanjá in the village of Santo Antônio dos Pretos, later moving it to the urban area of Codó, where the terreiro was expanded with the construction of the Palaces of Iansã and Iemanjá.

The terreiro became a major religious hub, receiving up to two thousand people per day during its festivals. His influence extended into the national political sphere, especially during the crisis preceding José Sarney's rise to power in the 1980s. This relationship earned him official honors, including the title of Commander of the Republic in 1993. His fame transformed him into a public figure, often sought out by celebrities and referred to in the press as the "pai-de-santo of the famous."

Alongside his religious leadership, Bita accumulated significant wealth in the region. Although he charged high fees for private consultations, he maintained strong community ties, reinvesting resources into the terreiro and social initiatives. He established his own ritual calendar, highlighted by the Festa de Santa Bárbara and the Festejo de Agosto, events that gathered hundreds of followers and solidified his spiritual lineage, which gave rise to over 300 terreiros in Codó.

The title of Commander of the Republic, received in 1993 with the support of José Sarney, represented the peak of his public recognition, granting him national visibility. This official honor also sparked debates about the legitimacy of state recognition for Afro-Brazilian religious leaders, marking the consolidation of Bita do Barão as a figure of both spiritual and political influence in the Brazilian landscape.

=== Death ===
In April 2019, after a severe lung infection, he was hospitalized in Teresina, Piauí, where he passed away on the 18th at the age of 86 due to multiple organ failure. Honoring his wishes, his body was taken to Codó and laid in state at the Tenda Rainha Iemanjá itself. The funeral was marked by widespread public mourning: thousands of people passed through the terreiro, authorities sent floral wreaths, and expressions of grief arrived from across the country. Codó declared an official three-day mourning period.

== Legacy ==
The death of Bita do Barão marked the end of an era, with leadership of the Tenda Rainha Iemanjá passing to his daughter, Mãe Janaína, who continues his traditions. His legacy transformed Codó into a national symbol of Afro-Brazilian spirituality, elevating once-marginalized practices and inspiring countless terreiros across Maranhão. Beyond religion, he became a mythical figure in popular culture, with his deeds remembered in stories and his home now a destination for cultural tourism.
