= State University of Montes Claros =

University in Brazil

- Universidade Estadual de Montes Claros
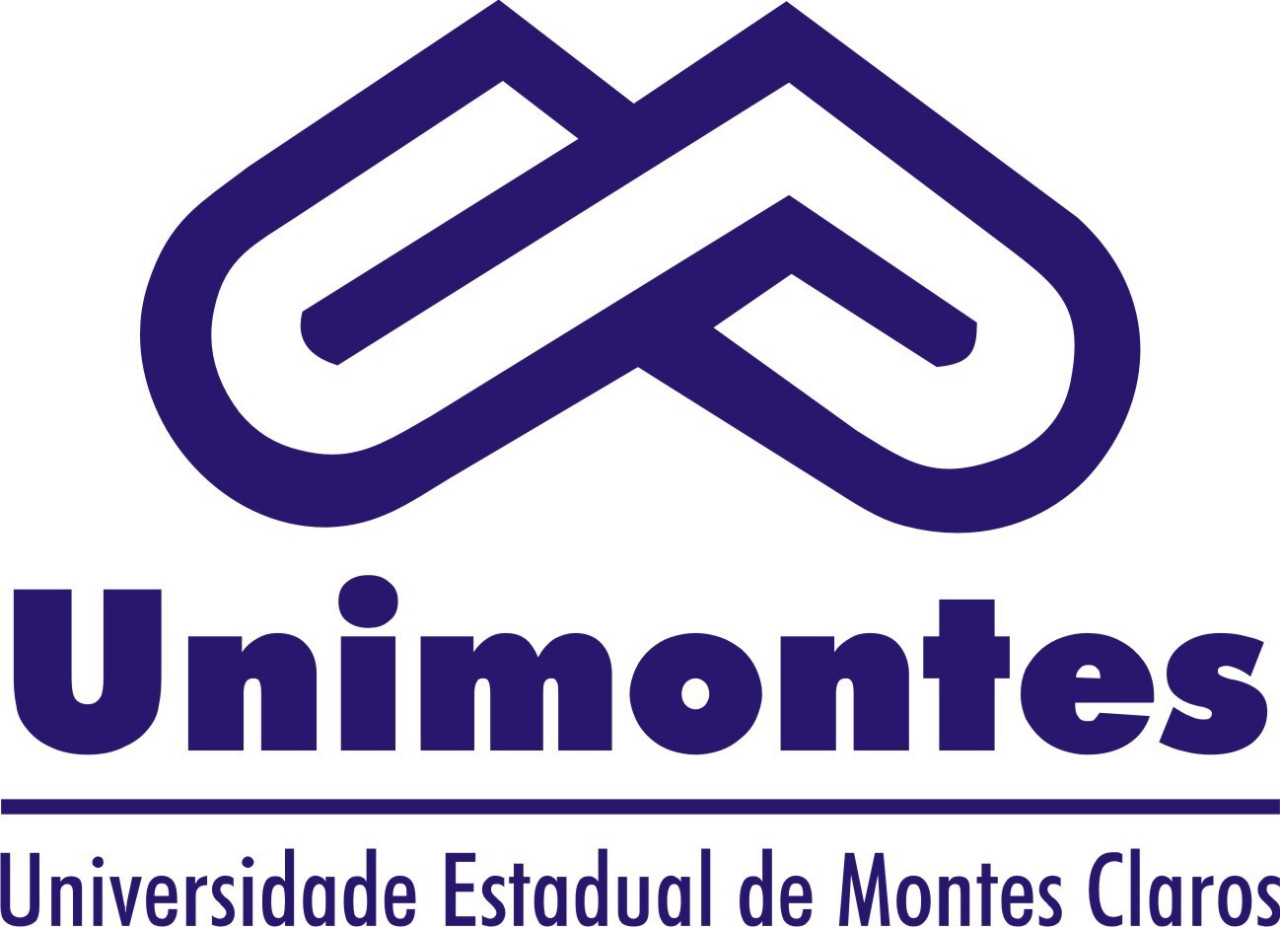
- Other names: Unimontes
- Type: Public university
- Established: 1962
- Location: Montes Claros, Minas Gerais, Brazil; 16°43′6.64″S 43°52′39.22″W
- Website: https://unimontes.br

The State University of Montes Claros (Portuguese: Universidade Estadual de Montes Claros, Unimontes) is a university in Brazil with its main campus at Montes Claros in the state of Minas Gerais. Unimontes started out as independent colleges, supported by a foundation. Between 1989–1990, it became an integrated governmental university, financed by the state of Minas Gerais, and by Fadenor. Unimontes has 10 campuses in cities that surround Montes Claros. The university has about 6000 students and 1008 teachers. Fadenor (a foundation that gives financial support to the university), has almost 15,000 students.

== See also ==
- List of state universities in Brazil
