= Sweet-Escott =

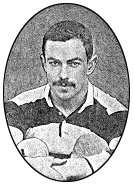
Ralph Sweet Escott

Sweet-Escott is a surname. Notable people with the surname include:

- Ernest Bickham Sweet-Escott (1857–1941), British colonial administrator
- Ralph Sweet-Escott (1869–1907), English rugby player
- Edward Sweet-Escott (1879–1956), English cricketer, brother of Ralph

== See also ==
- Sweet (surname)
- Escott (disambiguation)
