= Herbert Escott Inman =

British author

Herbert Escott Inman (1860–1915) was a British writer of fairy tales and boys' adventure and school stories. He also wrote an account of the shipwreck of the Dundonald off Disappointment Island in 1907.

== Life ==
He was born in Paddington, London, the second son of Robert Ford Inman (a clerk in an accountants office) and his wife Ann (née Bott). In the 1881 Census, the family is shown as living in West Ham and Herbert working as a chemist's assistant.

He married Clarissa Elizabeth Long in 1881 and had three children: Ivy Clarice, Herbert Ford and Frederick Seymour, all born in Dulwich. In the 1891 Census the family is shown as living in Camberwell, South London, and Inman is listed as a chemist's assistant and a Baptist Minister. In the 1901 Census he is listed as a Baptist minister and author.

Inman went on to write romance stories for the Sunday Companion paper. He also wrote Sexton Blake stories for the Union Jack paper in 1913–1914 which introduce the character of Henri 'The Snake' Garrock.

He died in 1915, at Herne Hill, aged 54.

His son Herbert Ford Inman also became a writer.

== Selected works ==
- The Admiral and I: A fairy story. (1902)
- The Castaways of Disappointment Island. Illustrations by Ernest Prater. (1911)
- David Chester's Motto. "Honour Bright": A boy's adventures at school and at sea, etc. (1904)
- The Did of Didn't-Think: A fairy story for boys and girls. Illustrations by W. Tayler. (1913)
- Gobbo Bobo the two-eyed griffin. Illustrations by E.A. Mason. (1900)
- Love first : A splendid complete story. (c1910)]
- Loyal and true. (1905)
- Mary True: Mill lass. (1910)
- Nancy Lee, Mill Lass. Frederick Warne, London (1913). Illustrations by G. H. Evison
- The Mill-Lass of Idderleigh. Illustrations by G. H. Evison. (1908)
- The Nidding Nod of Once-upon-a-time. (1901)
- The one-eyed griffin and other fairy stories. Illustrations by E. A. Mason. (1897)
- The owl king and other fairy stories. Illustrations by E. A. Mason. (1898)
- The Pattypats. (1898)
- The quest of Douglas Holms. Illustrations by Arthur Twidle. (1908)
- The Saga of Jarl the Neatherd. (1903)
- The Second Form Master of St. Cyril's. Illustrations by R. Potter. (1905)
- Sybil Darley. (1910)
- The tear of Kalee. (With H. Aspden.) (1902)
- Under the Toadstools
- Up the spider's web: A fairy folk fancy. (1893)
- What shall it profit? (1910)
- Wulnoth the wanderer: A story for boys. (1908 )

== Sources ==
- Steve Holland. Herbert F. Inman, 8 June 2007
- British 1881, 1891 and 1911 Censuses
- Copac National, Academic, and Specialist Library Catalogue
