= Abanca =

Spanish bank

ABANCA Corporación Bancaria, S.A.
- Formerly: NCG Banco, S.A. (2011–2014)
- Type: Sociedad anónima
- Industry: Financial services
- Predecessor: Caixa de Aforros de Galicia, Vigo, Ourense e Pontevedra
- Founded: 15 September 2011; 15 years ago in A Coruña, Spain
- Headquarters: Betanzos, Spain
- Number of locations: NGB: 680 branches; Abroad: 10 offices
- Area served: Spain nationwide
- Key people: Javier Etcheverría de la Muela (Chairman); Juan Carlos Escotet (Vice-chairman); Francisco Botas (CEO)
- Products: Banking services
- Services: Retail banking; Commercial banking
- Total assets: €85,148 (Q1 2026)
- Number of employees: 8,175 (2024)
- Divisions: NCG Corporación Industrial, S.L.; NCG División Grupo Immobiliario, S.L.
- Rating: Fitch: BB+; Moody's: B3; S&P: B+
- Website: www.abanca.com

ABANCA Corporación Bancaria (ABANCA) is a Spanish bank based in Galicia that provides banking services across Spain.

It was created in September in 2011 following the "bankisation" of Novacaixagalicia savings bank as NCG Banco. It operates in the autonomous communities of Galicia, Asturias and the province of León, in other parts of Spain and in Portugal, as well as offices in the United Kingdom, Germany, France, Switzerland, Brazil, Venezuela, Panama, Mexico and the United States, places with strong Galician communities.

Abanca has been designated as a significant institution since the entry into force of European Banking Supervision in late 2014, and as a consequence is directly supervised by the European Central Bank.

== History ==
=== Formation of NCG Banco ===
The bank was founded as NCG Banco, S.A. in September 2011 following the bankisation process of Novacaixagalicia. The company would operate as Novagalicia Banco in Galicia, Asturias and León and as EVO Banco in the rest of Spain.

Abanca originated from the savings bank NovaCaixaGalicia, established on December 1, 2010, following the merger of Caixa Galicia and Caixanova. This formation was a response to the stipulations of Royal Decree Law 2/2011, which necessitated the creation of a banking entity to manage the operations previously handled by NovaCaixaGalicia. At its inception, this subsidiary was wholly owned by the savings bank.

On September 14, 2011, NCG Banco, S.A. was established, with José María Castellano appointed as the executive chairman and César González-Bueno Mayer as the CEO. Notably, NCG Banco was the first bank to incorporate the Galician language in its founding deed.

On September 30, 2011, the European Commission in Brussels authorized the nationalization of NCG Banco, along with Catalunya Banc and Unnim Banc. As Novagalicia Banco's predecessor, the savings bank Novacaixagalicia, was subsequently bailed out by the Government of Spain the majority of the shares in the company were held by the bailout program Fund for Orderly Bank Restructuring (90.57%). As part of this process, NCG Banco received €2,465 million in capital from the Fund for Orderly Bank Restructuring (FROB). Consequently, the FROB acquired a 93.16% stake in NCG Banco. The Novacaixagalicia Foundation holds 6.84% with the remaining 2.59% being held by private investors.

Consequently, without its banking business, NovaCaixaGalicia's role was reduced to financially supporting its social work through the revenues derived from its ownership stake in NCG Banco.

On October 19, 2011, the commercial brand Novagalicia Banco was launched. Subsequently, on November 14, it was announced that the bank would operate under two distinct brands and business models: Novagalicia Banco serving Galicia, Asturias, Castilla y León, and international markets, and NGB covering the rest of Spain. This strategic adjustment also led to the formation of two new business units: one dedicated to wholesale banking and the other, known as the Singular Asset Management Unit (UGAS), focusing on non-strategic assets.

On January 12, 2012, 17 Galician businessmen entered the bank's capital through the purchase of 2.59% of the capital from the Fund for Orderly Bank Restructuring (FROB). This was divided between 90.57% of the FROB, 2.59% of the private investors and 6.84% of NovaCaixaGalicia.

=== Formation and Sale of Evo Bank and Restructuring of NCG Bank ===
On 12 March 2012 NCG Banco, S.A. began operating its assets outside of Galicia under the brand name EVO Banco and launched its main financial product the Cuenta Inteligente. In its first four weeks EVO Banco had attracted 8,290 clients and 70 million euros worth of investment.

On March 22, NCG Banco, S.A. and its union representatives came to an agreement to avoid forced layoff.

On July 12, 2012, the bank launched a media campaign featuring personal apologies from its Executive Chairman and CEO to its customers. This campaign addressed the previous investments in real estate made by the two savings banks that merged to form the bank during Spain's real estate bubble. Additionally, it acknowledged the sale of preferred shares to customers who were unaware of the associated risks. This initiative marked the first instance of a Spanish bank undertaking such a public apology campaign.

On December 27, 2012, FROB injected €5,425 million of aid from the European Stability Mechanism (ESM) into the bank, assuming full control of the entity. As a result, NovaCaixaGalicia transitioned into a special character foundation due to the loss of its capital in NCG Banco. Concurrently, the FROB converted €1,162 million worth of preferred shares, initially subscribed in December 2010 by NovaCaixaGalicia, into ordinary shares.

As part of NCG Banco's restructuring plan, it was determined that by 2017 the bank should concentrate its business model on retail lending and lending to small and medium-sized enterprises (SMEs) within its primary historical regions. The plan also included discontinuing credit lines associated with real estate developments and reducing its activities in the wholesale market.

On July 19, 2013, the Deposit Guarantee Fund (FGD) acquired a 25.57% stake in NCG Banco following a disbursement of €801.7 million, aimed at providing liquidity to the bank's preference shareholders and subordinated debt holders. After this transaction, the remaining ownership was distributed as follows: the FROB held 63%; hybrid instrument holders owned 9% (with 2% held by retail investors and 7% by wholesale investors); and the bank itself retained 2% as treasury stock.

On 9 September 2013 Novagalicia Banco announced that it would sell the EVO Banco division to the American private equity firm Apollo Global Management for 60 million euros.

On October 18, 2013, EVO Banco was registered in the Special Registry of Banks and Bankers of the Bank of Spain.

On November 19, 2013, FROB initiated the binding bidding process for the sale of NCG Banco. Potential bidders included notable banking institutions such as Banco Santander, BBVA, CaixaBank, and the Venezuelan bank Banesco, alongside investment funds like Guggenheim, WL Ross, J.C. Flowers, and Anchorage. The deadline for submitting binding bids was set for December 16. Following the review of these bids, provided no single offer was overwhelmingly more favorable, a second phase would commence. This phase would involve selecting the three entities with the best proposals, who would then be invited to submit their final offers.

On December 9, 2013, NCG Banco finalized the transfer of assets, liabilities, customers, employees, and services to EVO Banco. This completion occurred three months after the signing of the pre-sale agreement with Apollo European Principal Finance Fund II (Apollo EPF II), a fund managed by entities affiliated with Apollo Global Management.

On December 18, 2013, Banco Etcheverría, a subsidiary of Banesco, emerged as the winner in the first phase of the auction for NCG Banco with a bid of €1,003 million. This bid did not include public aid but incorporated additional guarantees of €275 million. As a result, Banco Etcheverría acquired an 88.33% stake in NCG Banco, which was primarily held by the FROB and the Deposit Guarantee Fund (FGD). The FROB received €712 million for its shares, culminating in a total loss to taxpayers of €8,269 million. Meanwhile, the FGD obtained €291 million from the sale, leaving a deficit of €511 million in the financial system.

On February 28, 2014, NCG Banco completed the transfer of all shares of EVO Banco to the Apollo fund, finalizing the acquisition of EVO Banco. Following the conclusion of this sale, NCG Banco expanded its presence by opening branches in other Spanish cities under the Novagalicia Banco brand.

=== Sale of NCG Banco and Formation of Abanca ===
Subsequently, Novagalicia Banco began opening branches in other cities in Spain under its own brand.

On 11 November 2013, the Spanish government bailout program Fund for Orderly Bank Restructuring (FROB) began the privatization process of Novagalicia Banco. After analyzing six bids presented by various Spanish banks, investments funds and international banks on December 18 the FROB opted to sell its shareholding to Banco Etcheverría, S.A, a Venezuelan-owned Spanish bank, for €1.03 billion

In April 2014, Banesco announced that the Novagalicia Banco brand would be discontinued following the completion of its acquisition of NCG Banco. A new brand was set to replace it.

On June 20, 2014, the European Commission approved the sale of NCG Banco along with the proposed amendments to its restructuring plan.

The sale was finalised on 25 June 2014 when Banesco, Banco Etcheverría's parent company, made an initial payment of €403 million. Banesco would pay a further €200 million on 30 June 2017 and the final payment of €300 million a year later. The board of directors was constituted, which approved the appointment of Banco Etcheverría's chairman, Javier Etcheverría, as chairman of NCG Banco.

The acquisition was conducted through Banesco Holding Financiero 2, S.L.U., which held the majority of the capital of Banco Etcheverría. Following the acquisition, Banesco Holding Financiero changed its corporate name to Abanca Holding Financiero, S.L.U.

On June 27, 2014, the bank commenced operations under the Abanca brand name, replacing the previously used Novagalicia Banco brand.

=== Rebranding ===
The following day, at an event held in the Galician capital, Santiago de Compostela, Novagalicia Banco revealed the new brand name for their bank: ABANCA (from a banca; Galician for "the bank"), a change which went into effect the very same day in all branches throughout the region.

=== Takeover of Banco Etcheverría ===
On October 6, 2014, the General Shareholders' Meetings of NCG Banco and Banco Etcheverría approved the merger by absorption of Banco Etcheverría by NCG Banco. The merger was finalized on November 14, 2014, with the resulting entity establishing its headquarters in Betanzos.

In December 2014 the company announced the merger of NCG Banco, S.A. with parent company Banco Echeverria, S.A. The company changed its legal name to ABANCA Corporación Bancaria, S.A. and its headquarters would be in the town of Betanzos, in the former headquarters of Banco Echeverria.

=== Acquisitions ===
==== Popular Servicios Financieros ====
On May 2, 2017, Abanca announced an agreement to acquire 100% of Popular Servicios Financieros, previously the consumer finance division of Banco Pastor, for €39 million. The transaction was completed in September of the same year, initiating the integration process of Abanca Consumer Finance and Popular Servicios Financieros, which was subsequently renamed Abanca Servicios Financieros.

==== Deutsche Bank Portugal ====
On 27 March 2018 Deutsche Bank announced its private and commercial client business in Portugal would be acquired by Abanca for €6.5bn. The business resumed trading Start of business on 11 June 2019.

On May 4, 2018, Eduardo Eraña Guerra assumed the interim chairmanship of the entity while Juan Carlos Escotet, the principal owner, attended to the affairs of Banesco in Venezuela, which was undergoing intervention by the Venezuelan government.

On November 22, 2018, the Portuguese Council of Ministers announced that Abanca had been selected as the successful bidder for Banco Caixa Geral, the Spanish subsidiary of the Portuguese bank Caixa Geral de Depósitos, with the acquisition valued at approximately €364 million.

On February 22, 2019, Abanca announced a conditional takeover bid of €1.7 billion for Liberbank, stipulating that it be granted access to the bank's accounts before March 1. However, the bid was withdrawn after the National Securities Market Commission (CNMV) prohibited the conditional nature of the offer and due to insufficient support from Liberbank's shareholders.

On April 29, 2019, the Boards of Directors of Abanca Corporación Bancaria, S.A. (the absorbing entity) and Abanca Holding Financiero, S.A. (the absorbed entity) approved the Common Merger Plan for the two companies.

On June 8 and 9, 2019, the integration of Deutsche Bank PCB Portugal into Abanca was successfully completed.

On June 10, 2019, the merger between Abanca Corporación Bancaria and Abanca Holding Financiero was approved at the Ordinary General Shareholders' Meeting of Abanca Corporación Bancaria, S.A.

==== Banco Caixa Geral ====
On October 14, 2019, Abanca completed the acquisition of Banco Caixa Geral for a total of €384 million, an increase from the initially estimated €364 million. This acquisition brought Abanca's control over Banco Caixa Geral's capital to 99.79%. Following the merger, Abanca gained an additional €7 billion in business from over 131,000 customers, as well as 110 new branches and more than 500 employees, particularly enhancing its presence in the provinces near the Portuguese border.

On February 27, 2020, the reverse merger between Abanca Corporación Bancaria (the absorbing company) and Abanca Holding Financiero (the absorbed company) was officially registered in the Mercantile Registry of La Coruña.

On March 16, 2020, Abanca completed the technological, brand, and legal integration of Banco Caixa Geral. This followed the legal and accounting merger of the two entities, which was finalized on March 13 with its registration in the Commercial Registry of La Coruña.

==== Bankoa ====
On January 28, 2021, Abanca finalized the acquisition of Bankoa from Crédit Agricole. This transaction enabled the Galician entity to increase its business volume by €4,267 million to €93,850 million, expand its commercial network with 30 branches and 3 corporate agencies primarily located in the Basque Country, and gain over 40,000 new customers. The acquisition involved the formal purchase of 99.81% of Bankoa's capital for €122.4 million. For the remaining approximately 0.2% of shares, Abanca offered 18.3 of its own shares for each share of Bankoa.

On April 26, 2021, the board of directors of Abanca approved the merger with Bankoa.

On November 12, 2021, the merger between Abanca and Bankoa was officially registered with the Mercantile Registry.

On November 14, 2021, Abanca completed the integration of Bankoa, finalizing the process with two key operations: the implementation of the brand and the transfer of activity to Abanca's technological and operational platforms. Following these steps, Abanca began operations in the Basque Country, Navarre, and La Rioja under the Bankoa Abanca brand.

==== Novo Banco Espana ====
On April 5, 2021, Abanca announced an agreement to acquire the Spanish business of Novo Banco. This acquisition was projected to elevate Abanca's business volume to 100,000 million euros, enhancing its presence in personal and private banking as well as corporate business sectors. With this operation, Abanca would manage assets totaling 71,338 million euros, loans and advances to customers amounting to 42,368 million euros, deposits of 46,037 million euros, and off-balance sheet liabilities of 11,789 million euros. The entity would also comprise 6,312 employees and 745 branches. Remarkably, Abanca agreed to pay one euro for this transaction. The purchase was finalized on November 30, 2021, and the transition to the Abanca branding began, with technological integration anticipated to occur in the last quarter of 2022.

In February 2022, aiming to improve banking accessibility for the elderly, Abanca announced a series of initiatives across its branches. These measures included offering individualized attention to elderly customers through personal managers, extending branch opening hours to 14:00, and a strong commitment to maintaining operations in the 134 municipalities where it is the sole financial institution.

==== TARGOBANK Espana ====
On December 22, 2022, Abanca announced the initiation of exclusive negotiations with Banque Fédérative du Crédit Mutuel (BFCM) for the acquisition of TARGOBANK España. The sale and purchase agreement were officially signed by both parties on February 22, 2023. The transaction was successfully concluded on October 6, 2023, marking the start of the technological integration process, which is scheduled to be completed in 2024. This acquisition resulted in a 6 billion euro increase in turnover, approximately 5.6% more than Abanca's total prior to the transaction. Moreover, the acquisition expanded Abanca's geographical footprint into the Mediterranean arc, Madrid, and Andalusia.

== Operations ==
=== Headquarters ===
Abanca has two operating headquarters; the institutional and business address in Vigo, and the social and tax address in A Coruña.

=== Shareholding ===
As of December 31, 2020, Abanca's shareholders were:

Shareholder	Ownership
Juan Carlos Escotet	84,75%
Minoritarios	14,72%
Autocartera	0,53%

=== Investment portfolio ===
Industry	Company	Percentage
Financial	Ahorro Corporación	6.38%
Automotive	Grupo Copo	21.1%
Seguros	Caser	10.31%
Energy	CLH	5%
Energy	Eólica Galenova	100%
Food	Sogevinus	100%
Infrastructure	Itinere	23.76%
Infrastructure	Elecnor	5.05%
Textile	Adolfo Domínguez	5.05%
Textile	Grupo Tavex	5%
Tourism	NH Hoteles	2.71%
Technology	Tecnocom	20.05%
Real estate	Quabit	3.19%%
Construction	Sacyr Vallehermoso	8.65%
Construction	General de Alquiler de Maquinaria	4.95%
Transport	Transmonbús	33.96%
Shipbuilding	Naviera Elcano	12%

== Branch Network ==
As of September 30, 2023, Abanca maintained a network of 677 branches and employed 6,288 individuals. Within Spain, the bank operated 623 branches. In the Basque Country, Navarra, and La Rioja, it conducted business under the Bankoa Abanca brand. Abanca also had a presence in Portugal with 70 points of sale and extended its operations to nine additional countries across Europe and America.

== See also ==
- List of banks in the euro area
- List of banks in Spain
