= Eduardo Braide =

Brazilian lawyer and politician

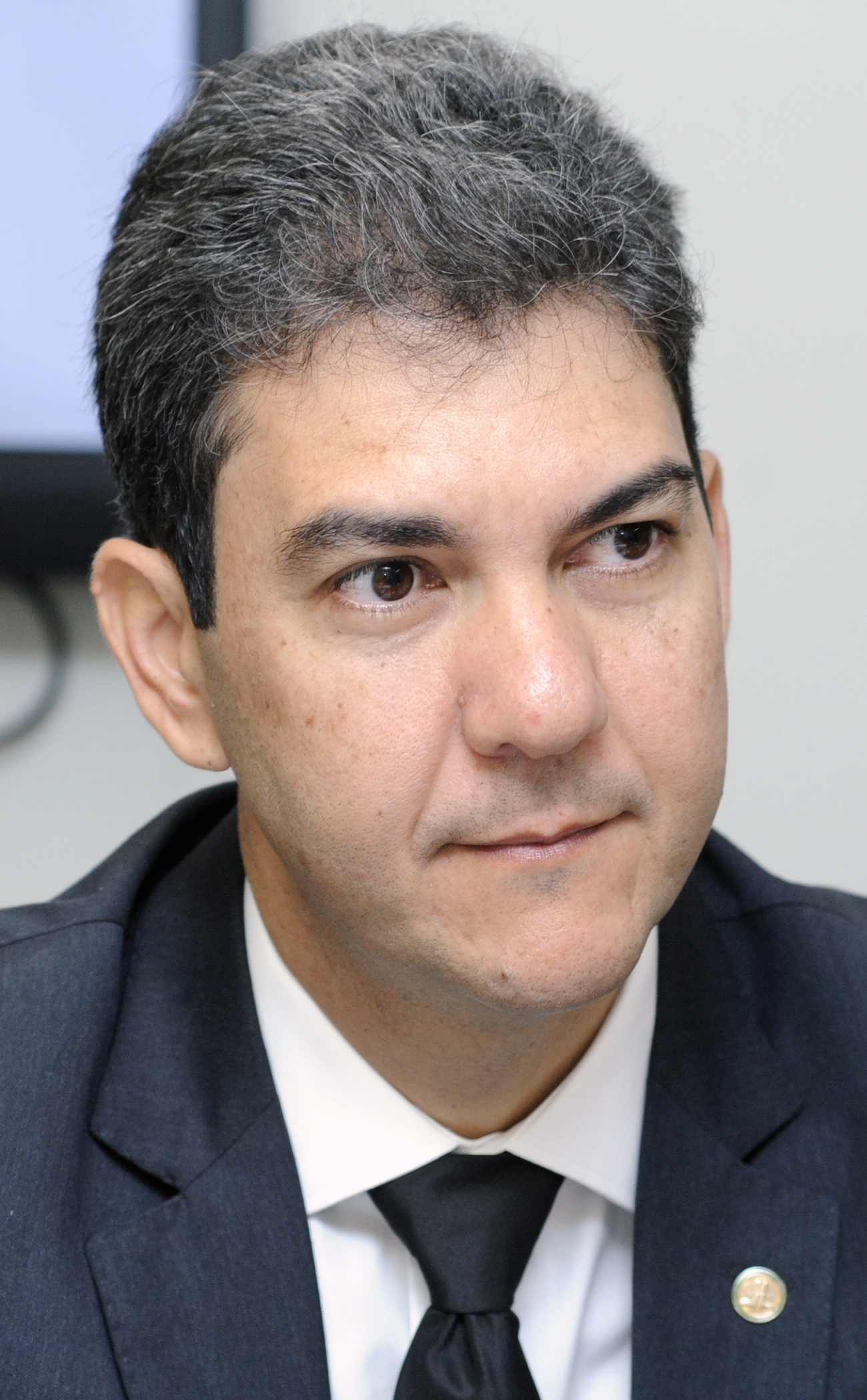
- Braide in 2019

Governor-elect of Maranhão
- Assuming office 6 January 2027
- Vice Governor: Elaine Carneiro (elect)
- Succeeding: Carlos Brandão

Mayor of São Luís
- In office 1 January 2021 – 31 March 2026
- Vice Mayor: Esmênia Miranda
- Preceded by: Edivaldo Holanda Júnior
- Succeeded by: Esmênia Miranda

Member of the Chamber of Deputies
- In office 1 February 2019 – 1 January 2021
- Constituency: Maranhão

Member of the Legislative Assembly of Maranhão
- In office 1 February 2011 – 1 February 2019
- Constituency: At-large

Personal details
- Born: Eduardo Salim Braide; 12 January 1976 (age 50) São Luís, Maranhão, Brazil
- Party: PSD (2022–present)
- Other political affiliations: PSB (2006–2009); PMN (2009–2019); PODE (2019–2022)
- Spouse: Graziela Medeiros
- Children: 3
- Education: Federal University of Maranhão

Eduardo Salim Braide (born 12 January 1976) is a Brazilian lawyer and politician, who served as the mayor of São Luís from 2021 to 2026. Previously, he was president of the state water utility Caema (2005–2006), state secretary of Participatory Budgeting (2009–2010), and a state deputy in the legislative assemby of Maranhão from 2011 until 2018.

Braide resigned the mayoralty in March 2026 to run for Governor of Maranhão.

Political offices
| Preceded by Edivaldo Holanda Júnior | Mayor of São Luís; 2021–2026 | Succeeded by Esmênia Miranda |
| Preceded by Carlos Brandão | Governor of Maranhão; Taking office 2027 | Elect |
