= Universidade Estadual da Região Tocantina do Maranhão =

State Universidade of Tocantins Region of Maranhão
- Universidade Estadual da Região Tocantina do Maranhão
- Other name: UEMASUL
- Type: Public university
- Rector: Prof. PhD.
- Location: Imperatriz, Maranhão, Brazil
- Website: www.uemasul.edu.br

The State University of Tocantinensis Region of Maranhão a.k.a. State University of South Maranhão (Portuguese: Universidade Estadual da Região Tocantina do Maranhão, UEMASUL) is a state university in the northeastern state of Maranhão, Brazil.

== See also ==
- List of state universities in Brazil
