= State University of the Centre-West =

State University of the Central-West of Paraná
- Universidade Estadual do Centro-Oeste do Paraná
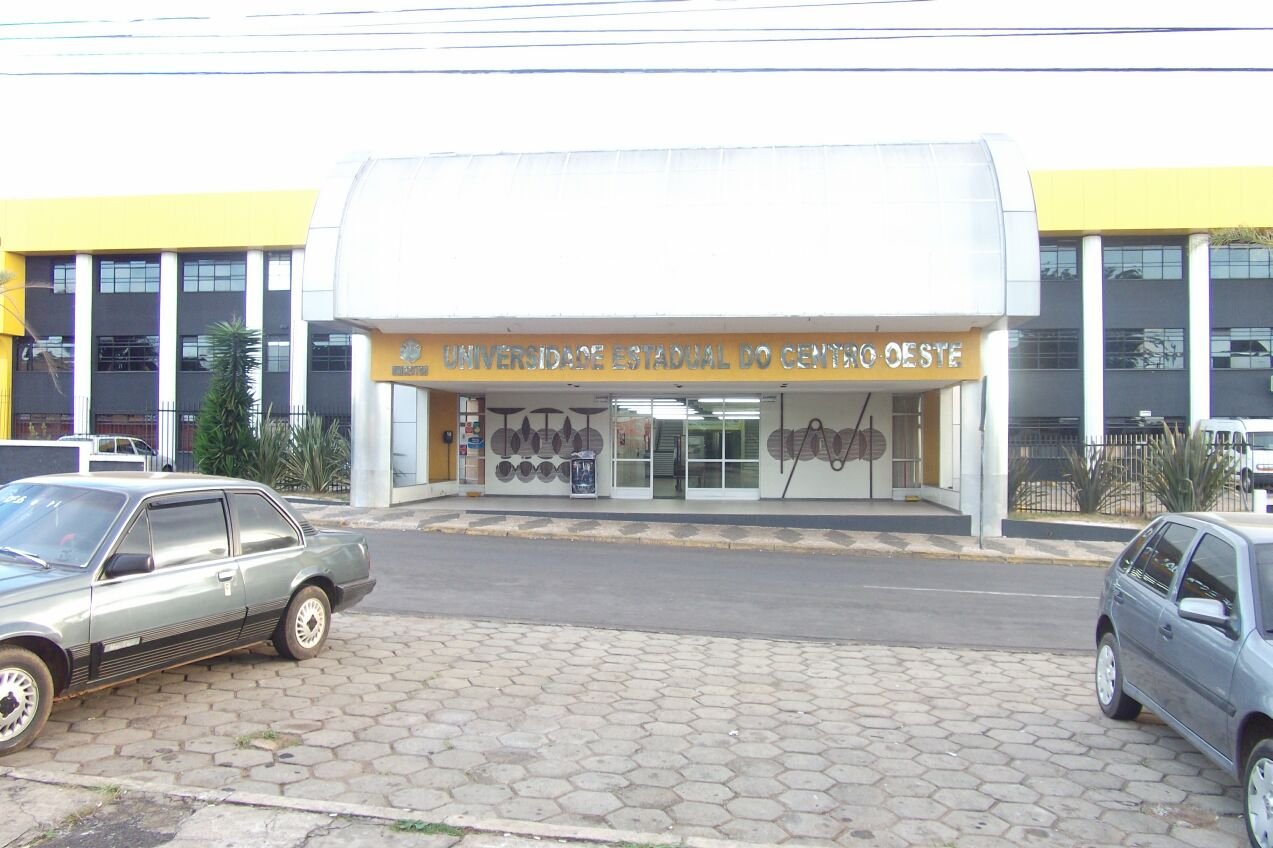
- Campus in Guarapuava
- Type: Public, state
- Established: June 13, 1990; 36 years ago
- Affiliations: RENEX
- Budget: 222 million (2020)
- Rector: Fabio Hernandes
- Academic staff: 839
- Administrative staff: 230
- Students: 11,087
- Undergraduates: 8,710
- Postgraduates: 2,377
- Location: Guarapuava, Paraná, Brazil
- Website: unicentro.br

The State University of the Central-West of Paraná (Portuguese: Universidade Estadual do Centro-Oeste; UNICENTRO) is a state university in Brazil, maintained by the government of the state of Paraná, with its headquarters in the city of Guarapuava, where it has two campuses: Santa Cruz and Cedeteg. It has a campus in the city of Irati and campuses in the cities of Chopinzinho, Coronel Vivida, Laranjeiras do Sul, Pitanga and Prudentópolis.

== History ==
UNICENTRO was formed through the merger of two public colleges in the state of Paraná, the Faculty of Philosophy, Sciences, and Letters of Guarapuava (FAFIG), founded in 1970, and the Faculty of Education, Sciences, and Letters of Irati (FECLI), founded in 1974. It was established by Law No. 9,295, on June 13, 1990, but its recognition as a university only occurred on August 8, 1997, by Decree No. 3,444 of the Government of the State of Paraná.

UNICENTRO was accredited to the Brazilian Open University System (UAB) in 2008.

In 2018, it started offering the Pedagogy for the Field course.

== Divisions ==
=== Health Sciences Unit ===
- Speech Therapy and Audiology
- Nutrition
- Physical Therapy
- Pharmacy
- Health Sciences
- Physical Education
- Nursing
- Psychology

=== Agrarian and Environmental Sciences Unit ===
- Horticulture
- Forestry
- Agronomy
- Veterinary Science
- Agricultural Engineering
- Geography
- Biological and Life Sciences
- Environmental Engineering
- Mathematics

=== Applied Social Sciences Unit ===
- Secretarial Studies
- Social and Community Services
- Administration
- Tourism
- Accountancy
- Economics

=== Exact Sciences and Technology Unit ===
- Applied Chemistry
- Food Science
- Engineering
- Physics
- Chemistry
- Mathematics
- Computer Science

=== Human Sciences, Letters and Arts Unit ===
- Portuguese
- Art Education
- Spanish
- Mass Communication
- Pedagogy
- Philosophy
- Literature
- Arts and Humanities
- History
- Education
- English
