= Beryl E. Escott =

Canadian-born writer

Beryl E. Escott is a Canadian-born writer specializing in the history of the Women's Auxiliary Air Force. A native of Newfoundland, Escott was educated in Wales and England. She served in the Royal Air Force from 1961 to 1986.

== RAF publications ==
- History of RAF Church, High Wycombe Published by RAF BC 1967
- History of RAF High Wycombe Published by RAF BC 1968 Ed3'70
- Springfield Lodge, CinC's House Published by RAF BC 1969
- Art Works of Officers Mess RAF High Wycombe Published by RAF BC 1969
- Story of Halton House Published by RAF Halton in 1984 Ed4'08

== Civilian publications ==
- Women in Air Force Blue: The story of women in the Royal Air Force from 1918 to the present day. Stephens. 15 May 1989. ISBN 978-1-85260-066-2.
- Mission Improbable: a salute to RAF women of SOE in wartime France. P. Stephens. 18 February 1991. ISBN 978-1-85260-289-5.
- Our Wartime Days: the WAAF in World War II. A. Sutton. 23 February 1995. ISBN 978-0-7509-0638-8.
- Twentieth century women of courage. Sutton. 24 September 1999. ISBN 978-0-7509-1892-3.
- WAAF. Osprey Publishing. 4 March 2008. ISBN 978-0-7478-0572-4.
- The Heroines of SOE: Britain's Secret Women in France. The History Press. 1 November 2010. ISBN 978-0-7524-5661-4.
