= Banesco =

Venezuelan bank

Banesco Banco Universal C.A.

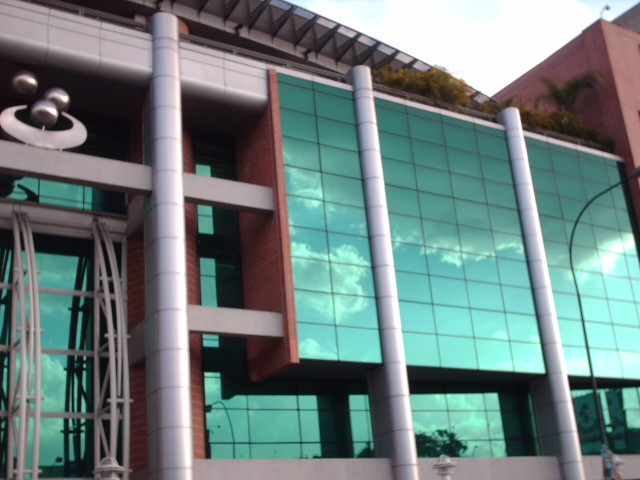
- Entrance of Ciudad Banesco (2005)
- Type: Public company
- Traded as: BVC: BBC
- Industry: Finance and Insurance
- Founded: 1992
- Headquarters: Caracas, Venezuela
- Products: Retail banking
- Number of employees: 7,861
- Website: www.banesco.com (in Spanish)

Banesco Banco Universal C.A. is a Venezuelan financial institution whose principal branch is located in Caracas. The bank is part of Asociación Bancaria de Venezuela (Venezuela's Banking Association).

Banesco has 340 branches all over Venezuela, more than 115.000 POS and 1.377 ATMs. With more than six million clients, Banesco currently is the largest private banking business in Venezuela and the second among all, with a market quota of [null 21.32%] on total assets and [null 18.3%] on credit portfolio.

The primary competitors are the Banco Mercantil, Banco Occidental de Descuento, Banco de Venezuela and the BBVA Banco Provincial; all these banks including Banesco form the upper stratum of the Bank Ranking of Superintendent of the Institutions of the Banking Sector of Venezuela (SUDEBAN).

The financial group also includes an insurance, and consumer banking division. The bank is a member of the Banking Association of Venezuela and their mascot is Baneskín "El Pana de Ahorro" (The Savings 'Buddy'). Banesco's Caracas headquarters, Ciudad Banesco, at 65,000 m^{2}, is second Latin America's largest bank headquarters after brazilian bank Bradesco Headquarters.

== History ==
Banesco is one of the first Venezuelan banks holding only Venezuelan capital. It was founded in 1977 as the Banco Agroindustrial Venezolano (Venezuelan Agroindustrial Bank), until it changed its name to Banco Financiero (Financial Bank) in 1987. In 1992, after changing their name to Bancentro, the bank was acquired by the Banesco Financial Organization, the banking division came to dominate the company and was combined with the other divisions to form a banco universal (universal bank) (i.e. a bank that competes in all banking sectors like commercial banking, investment banking, lending, etc.).

Banesco Banco Universal was first founded as a brokerage house, in 1986, under the name of Escotet Casa de Bolsa. It started working on the financial industry in 1992, after the acquisition and takeover of a regional bank named Grupo Bancentro, that after this, obtained the name Grupo Financiero Banesco (Banesco Financial Group). Since then, the founders of this institution have emerged other banking business with their own, turning them into Banesco Banco Universal in 2002.

In December 2016, the Supreme Court of Venezuela ordered the seizure of assets from Banesco—amounting to over $7.7 million—due to a breach of a mandate agreement and a claim for damages dating back to October 2015. Shortly after, the bank announced that it would pay the required sum.

The most remarkable facts in Banesco's history are as it follows:

- 1986 – Casa de Bolsa Escotet Valores, brokerage house was founded.
- 1991–1992 – The company changed its name to Banesco Casa de Bolsa after buying Grupo de Empresas Bancentro (a banking group that owned other banking business, including Banco Financiero bank, that changed its name in 1990).
- 1992–1993 – After changing its commercial name, the companies under Grupo Bancentro identified themselves as Banesco Banco Comercial, Banesco Banco Hipotecario (for mortgages services), Banesco Fondo de Activos Líquidos and Banesco Arrendamiento Financiero. Additionally, Banesco Fondo Mutual, Banesco Sociedad Administradora de Fondos Mutuales, Banesco Sociedad Financiera, Banesco Seguros, Banesco Banco Internacional Puerto Rico, Banesco Banco Internacional Panamá and Banesco Mercado de Capitales were created. Thus, the expansion of this banking business started to happen into new frontiers.
- 1997 – The Emergency Financial Assistance approved the merging between Banesco Comercial, Banesco Arrendamiento Financiero and Banesco Fondo de Activos Líquidos. That same year, the Banking Superintendence authorized Banesco Comercial C.A. to start working as an international bank, called Banesco Banco Universal. Its website is launched for the first time.
- 1997 – Banesco bought five small banking businesses, Bancarios, El Porvenir, La Industrial and Caja Popular.
- 1998 – The Emergency Financial Assistance approved the unification of the small banking businesses bought by Banesco, now known by the name Caja Familia Entidad de Ahorro y Préstamo.
- 2000 – On 23 March 2000 the merging from La Primera Entidad de Ahorro y Préstamo to Caja Familia Entidad de Ahorro y Préstamo got approved.
- 2001 – During this year, the biggest and most important merging between banking businesses in Venezuela happened, Caja Familia Entidad de Ahorro y Préstamo, Banco Unión (founded in 1946), Crédito Unión C.A and Banesco Inmuebles became Unibanca Banco Universal. The merging took place on 12 February 2001.
- 2002 – The merging process between Banesco and Unibanca finishes, turning into Banesco Banco Universal, adopting Unibanca's old logo. Banesco starts to become the most important bank on private banking in Venezuela.

Internationalization

The internactonalization process started in 1992–1993, with the founding of the bank in Panama and in Puerto Rico, each one with an international operating license. Since then, its presence on international banking markets has increased and reached the United States (only in Florida), Panama, Dominican Republic, Colombia and Spain. It has been considered to grow even bigger in Latin America.

== Directors ==
- Chairman Directors Board:
- Executive chairman:
- Director:
- Director:
- Director:

== Subsidiaries of Grupo Banesco ==
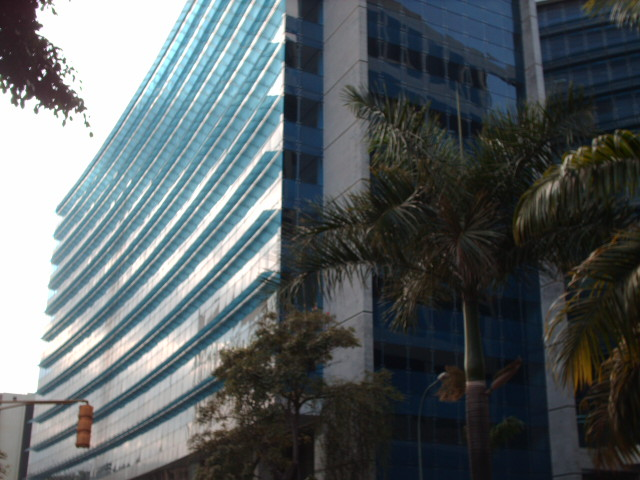
Seat of Seguros Banesco.

The following firms are part of Banesco Grupo Financiero Internacional:

- Seguros Banesco
- Banco Etcheverría
- Banesco Panamá
- Banesco República Dominicana
- Banesco USA
- TodoTicket
- Abanca , former Novagalicia Banco

== Branches ==
Banesco has 340 branches all over Venezuela. The most relevant branches are the following:

Ciudad Banesco

It is the building in which the main offices are located, in Caracas. The building used to be used for the department store Sears Roebuck of Venezuela, until it left the country and was bought by another department store brand, Maxi's. Banesco bought the building in 2004 and reopened it under a brand new concept, which suits the bank's needs better than it did before.

Thanks to the changes made, Ciudad Banesco became an eco-friendly building, thus the materials used to its refurbishments. Ciudad Banesco was awarded with the Premio Annual Construcción 2004 (Annual Building Awards), given by Cámara Venezolana de la Construcción (Venezuela's Construction Chamber).

Torre Banesco (Banesco Tower)

This installation has two buildings located in El Rosal, in Caracas; both buildings were Banesco's main offices until 2004, when they got moved into Ciudad Banesco. Currently, some offices are still operating in these buildings.

Esquina El Chorro Branch

This tower is located in Avenida Universidad, downtown Caracas. Initially, it was called Torre Union (Union Tower) property of the old banking business Banco Union that, after the merging with Caja Familia (member of Grupo Banesco) it became Unibanca. After the merging process had finished, it became Banesco and the tower was sold to the Venezuelan government. Currently, it serves as the main office for the Ministerio de Educación Universitaria, Ciencia y Tecnología (Ministry of High Education, Culture and Technology).

Its former vaults, where Banco Union used to be, have been turned into a printing warehouse, where all the governmental material is printed, such as books and other hand-outs, it also is the main office for the Fundación Impresa Cultural, an extension for the National Printing House (where National Gazettes get printed) next to the main entrance, there is a little square called "Plaza Unión" (Union Square), but in 2002 it changed its name for "Plaza Unibanca" (Unibanca Square). However, and after the selling of the building, the square passed to be called "Plaza de los Saberes" (Knowledge Square).
