= Banco Etcheverría =

Banco Etcheverría, S.A.
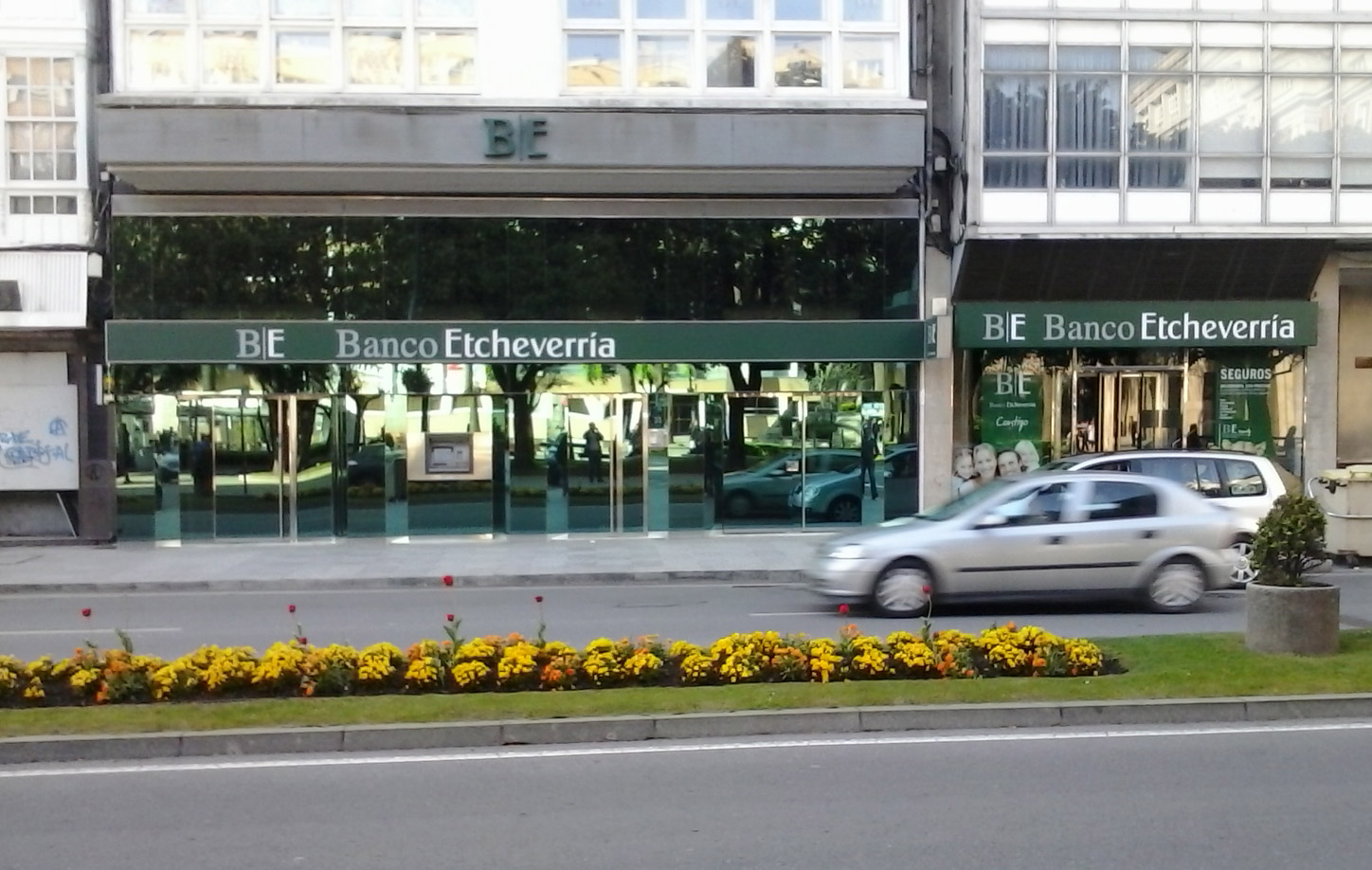
- Company type: Sociedad Anónima
- Industry: Financial services
- Founded: Betanzos, Galicia (1717)
- Founder: Juan Etcheverry
- Defunct: 6 October 2014
- Fate: Merged with NCG Banco, S.A.
- Successor: Abanca Corporación Bancaria, S.A
- Headquarters: A Coruña, Spain
- Area served: Nationwide
- Key people: Javier Etcheverría, Chairman; Domingo Etcheverría, Vice-Chairman; Francisco Botas, CEO
- Services: Private banking; Wealth management
- Owner: Banesco Banco Universal S.A (44.73%)
- Number of employees: 150 (2007)
- Website: www.bancoetcheverria.es

Banco Etcheverría was a Spanish bank. The family-owned bank was the oldest in the Spanish financial system, and the 11th oldest surviving bank in the world, older by over half a century than the Bank of Spain itself. It was founded in Betanzos, A Coruña (Spain) in 1717 by Juan Etcheverry (née Jean d’Etcheverry), a French businessman and tannery owner who had settled in Galicia.

His family inherited and continued the bank business through generations; the primitive Etcheverry transformed the surname to Etcheverría to adapt to Spanish spelling (although the standard Spanish spelling is now Echeverría). The name comes from the Basque surname Etxeberria, meaning "the new house". In 1964 it became a sociedad anónima. Its current stockholders (Francisco Javier, Asunción, María Cruz and Magdalena Etcheverría de la Muela) are all from the Etcheverría family, except the Caixa Galicia savings bank, which bought a 37.12% stake in 2002 for 13.25 million euros.

It had offices in all four Galician provinces, and in Madrid. It specialized in personal banking and wealth management.

In December 2012 Venezuela's largest bank, Banesco, bought the largest stake in Banco Etcheverría by acquiring the 44.7% owned in the latter by nationalized Spanish bank Novagalicia Banco (NGB) and shares owned by the Etcheverría family.

After Banesco's entry, the following table reflects the voting rights:

Share-holder	Rights to Vote
Banco Banesco	44.73%
Domingo Etcheverría de la Muela	12.63%
Mª Cruz Etcheverría de la Muela	11.72%
Mª Magdalena Etcheverría de la Muela	11.72%
Alberto Gómez Etcheverría	5,01%
Mª Asunción Etcheverría de la Muela	3,99%

In 2014, the bank was acquired by Abanca; ABANCA and Banco Etcheverría were merged into ABANCA Grupo Banesco.

== See also ==
- List of banks in Spain
