= Federal University of Maranhão =

Public university in Brazil

- Universidade Federal do Maranhão
- Other name: UFMA
- Motto: Life is Combat
- Type: Public university
- Established: October 21, 1966
- Rector: Prof. PhD. Natalino Salgado
- Location: São Luís, Maranhão, Brazil
- Website: www.ufma.br

The Federal University of Maranhão (Portuguese: Universidade Federal do Maranhão, UFMA) is a federal university in the northeastern state of Maranhão, Brazil.

== See also ==
- List of federal universities of Brazil
