= Ángel Escribano =

Spanish businessman (born 1971)

- Born: Ángel Escribano Ruiz; 1971 (age 54–55); Madrid, Spain
- Occupation: Businessman
- Known for: EM&E co-founder and Indra Sistemas President
- Relatives: Javier (brother)

Ángel Escribano Ruiz (born 1971) is a Spanish businessman. Escribano is the co-founder of the defence company Escribano Mechanical & Engineering (EM&E) and is the current President of Indra Sistemas, a Spanish defence and information technology company, since January 2025.

== Early life ==
Born in Madrid, Spain, in a humble family in 1971, Angel Escribano Ruiz and his brother Javier started working in his father's mechanic's workshop at the age of fourteen.

== Career ==
=== EM&E ===
With his brother, Javier, he co-founded Escribano Mechanical & Engineering (EM&E) in 1989. Initially starting as a small machining workshop in Coslada, Madrid, EM&E evolved under Ángel and Javier's leadership into a significant player in the Spanish defence and security industry. EM&E grew from manufacturing mechanical parts to developing and manufacturing various defence systems which includes remote controlled weapon station, electro-optics and guided ammunition kits. The company uses a significant part of its production capacity for defence exports. Between 2019 and 2021, EM&E doubled its revenue. In May 2023, EM&E became one of Indra's industrial partners by acquiring a 3% stake in the defence and information technology company. EM&E incrementally increased their shareholding of Indra over time, making Angel and his brother one of the company's largest shareholders with a 14.3% ownership, second only to the Spanish government's holding through SEPI. Escribano's company, EM&E, has a joint venture in India with brothers Adhiraj and Suryaveer Khanna, sons of Arvind Khanna and members of a family with a history in the Indian defence industry.

In April 2025, it was reported that EM&E was considered as an acquisition target and also a merger target by Indra Sistemas; however, no transaction took place, with Escribano's brother and chairman of EM&E, Javier, stating that company is not for sale and is worth over €1.0 billion.

=== Indra Sistemas ===
Escribano was appointed as President of Indra Sistemas on January 19, 2025, succeeding Marc Murtra, who transitioned to head Telefónica. This appointment came after an extraordinary board meeting, where Escribano was chosen due to his significant shareholding and his experience in the defence sector. His tenure at Indra is anticipated to focus on bolstering the company's position in the defense technology sector both domestically and internationally. His brother, Javier, took over as President of EM&E after Escribano's appointment as President of Indra Sistemas.

In May 2025, Indra Sistemas signed a memorandum of understanding with Rheinmetall Landsysteme, a subsidiary of the German company Rheinmetall, for working on armored vehicle projects for the Spanish Armed Forces and Escribano stated that his intention is for Indra Sistemas to bolster Spanish armored vehicle manufacturing and digitalization capabilities. Escribano has also stated that he plans for Indra Sistemas to enter tank building.
