= Ensygnia =

UK-based technology company

- Founded: 2012; 14 years ago
- Founders: Richard H Harris, Matt Deacon
- Headquarters: Reading, Berkshire, UK
- Products: Onescan
- Website: www.ensygnia.com

Ensygnia is a UK-based technology company that provides identity management, mobile payments and cyber security services. Ensygnia's primary product is Onescan, a transaction and identity management platform.

== History ==
Ensygnia operations began in 2012. In 2013 the company secured $3.3 million in seed funding and successfully applied for and received two UK patents. Ensygnia was also one of 17 start-ups accepted into the London-based Telefonica funded Wayra Academy for the year 2013. At the end of 2013, Ensygnia acquired Mustard Digital and its retail site Snaptaps.

In 2014, Ensygnia won 'Best Software Solution' at the Mobile Industry Awards, reached the final on the Innotribe start-up challenge and became a start-up in residence at BBC labs.

In June 2015, Ensygnia was listed as one of the best funded (B2B) Commerce Enablers in Europe.

== See also ==
- Computer security
- Mobile payments
- Identity management
