= Geniusmatcher =

Israeli tech company

MAlly

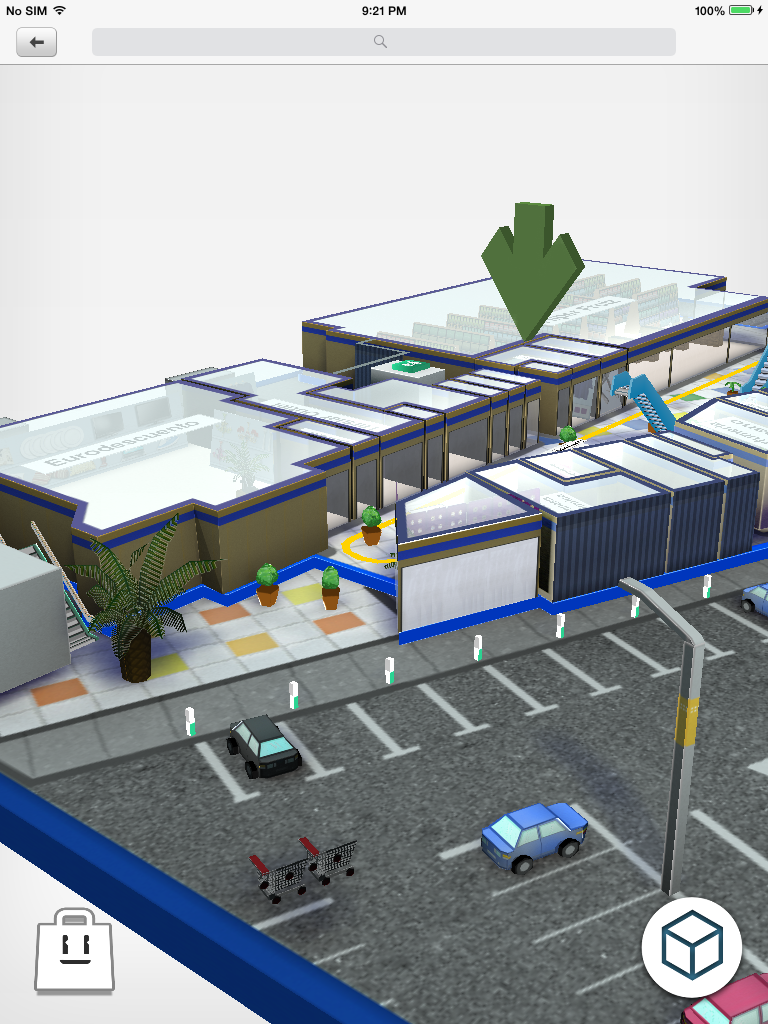
- 3D map screenshot of Mally indoor navigation app
- Developer: Geniusmatcher LTD
- Preview release: 0.73 (beta) (iOS); 0.53 (beta) (Android); / May 6, 2014
- Operating system: Android, iOS, Windows
- Type: Indoor Positioning System
- License: Commercial proprietary software
- Website: www.geniusmatcher.com

Geniusmatcher is an Israeli company based in Haifa, founded in 2012 by Frida Issa and Pablo Garcia-Morato Fernandez-Baillo. They created a patented platform combining computer vision and 3D technology to create a hardware-free solution for mapping, positioning, and navigating in any indoor location. Their first product for shopping centers, MALLY (My Mall in Hebrew מולי), has interactive 3D maps that tell the visitors where they are standing and what is around them. It also shows how to get to each spot and who is there to share their experience with. The platform has content and notification support, with 2D to 3D automatic conversion, managed in the cloud and displayable on all mobile devices.

In February 2014, the company joined Wayra,⁣ the Telefonica global accelerator and opened offices in London and Madrid (managed by Jorge García-Morato - Geniusmatcher's COO).

== Content ==
The content is published by the platform's customers, initially shopping centers. They can access a CMS where they can both create the 3D maps automatically by scanning 2D plans (PNG, JPEG, PDF) and they can create and assign all the content to be displayed (shops info, offers, events, etc.).
