= Politec =

- Industry: Information Technology
- Headquarters: Brasília, Brazil
- Number of employees: 6000+ (2011)
- Parent: Indra Sistemas
- Website: Official website (in Portuguese)

Politec is an IT outsourcing service provider, based in Brasília, Brazil. It employs over 6,000 people. In 2011, it was acquired by the Spanish company Indra Sistemas.

== Awards ==
- BusinessWeek Magazine (2006), ranked #2 in Gartner's “Top 15 Emerging Outsourcing Players”
- Global Services GS100 List (2007), included in “World’s Top 10 Best Performing IT Services Providers”
