= Postal codes in Spain =

Spanish postal codes were introduced on 1 July 1984, when the Sociedad Estatal de Correos y Telégrafos introduced automated mail sorting. They consist of five numerical digits, where the first two digits, ranging 01 to 52, correspond either to one of the 50 provinces of Spain or to one of the two autonomous cities on the African coast.

== Two-digit prefixes ==
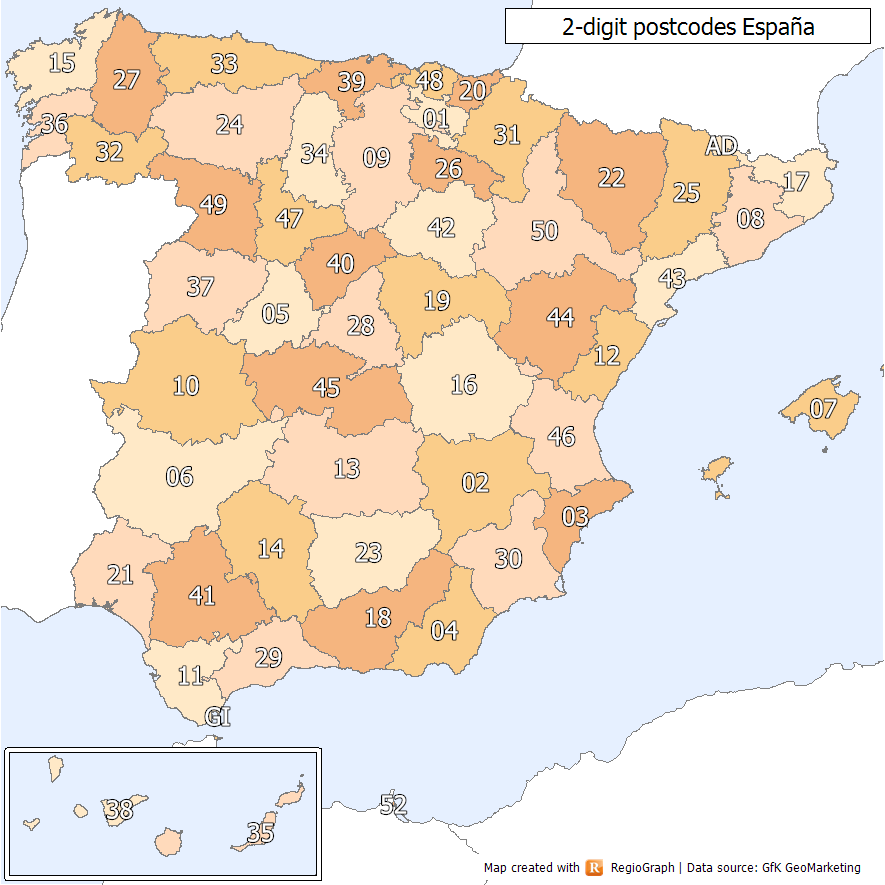
Two-digit postcode areas

The first two digits of a Spanish postal code identify the province or autonomous city it belongs to. The numbers were assigned to the 50 provinces of Spain ordered alphabetically at the time of implementation. The official names of some of the provinces have since changed, either to the regional language version of the name (e.g. from the Spanish Guipúzcoa to the Basque Gipuzkoa) or to adopt the name of the autonomous community instead of the provincial capital (e.g. Santander to Cantabria). In these cases, the originally assigned code has been maintained, resulting in some exceptions to the alphabetical order. In addition, Ceuta and Melilla were originally included within the postal areas of Cádiz and Málaga respectively; in 1995 they were assigned their own codes and hence ended up at the end of the list.

The list below includes all 52 two-digit prefixes assigned to the 50 provinces and two autonomous cities. Included in brackets are the names of the provinces that were used for alphabetical sorting at the time of implementation, if different from the current name used in English.

- 01 Álava
- 02 Albacete
- 03 Alicante
- 04 Almería
- 05 Ávila
- 06 Badajoz
- 07 Balearic Islands (Baleares)
- 08 Barcelona
- 09 Burgos
- 10 Cáceres
- 11 Cádiz
- 12 Castellón
- 13 Ciudad Real
- 14 Córdoba
- 15 A Coruña (Coruña, La)
- 16 Cuenca
- 17 Girona (Gerona)
- 18 Granada
- 19 Guadalajara
- 20 Gipuzkoa (Guipúzcoa)
- 21 Huelva
- 22 Huesca
- 23 Jaén
- 24 León
- 25 Lleida (Lérida)
- 26 La Rioja (Logroño)
- 27 Lugo
- 28 Madrid
- 29 Málaga
- 30 Murcia
- 31 Navarre (Navarra)
- 32 Ourense (Orense)
- 33 Asturias (Oviedo)
- 34 Palencia
- 35 Las Palmas (Palmas, Las)
- 36 Pontevedra
- 37 Salamanca
- 38 Santa Cruz de Tenerife
- 39 Cantabria (Santander)
- 40 Segovia
- 41 Seville (Sevilla)
- 42 Soria
- 43 Tarragona
- 44 Teruel
- 45 Toledo
- 46 Valencia
- 47 Valladolid
- 48 Biscay (Vizcaya)
- 49 Zamora
- 50 Zaragoza
- 51 Ceuta
- 52 Melilla

== Following digits ==
The third digit of a Spanish postal code is used to identify major cities or basic itineraries. A zero denotes a provincial capital, e.g. San Sebastián, as capital of the province of Gipuzkoa, uses the postal code 200xx.

The fourth and fifth digits are used to identify delivery areas, route itineraries or rural link itineraries.

Some codes are reserved for special use at the province capital:

- 070: official use by Correos
- 071: to address state agencies at the given province
- 080: P.O. boxes and mail lists
