= La Mudarra =

Coordinates: 41°47′N 4°57′W

La Mudarra, Spain
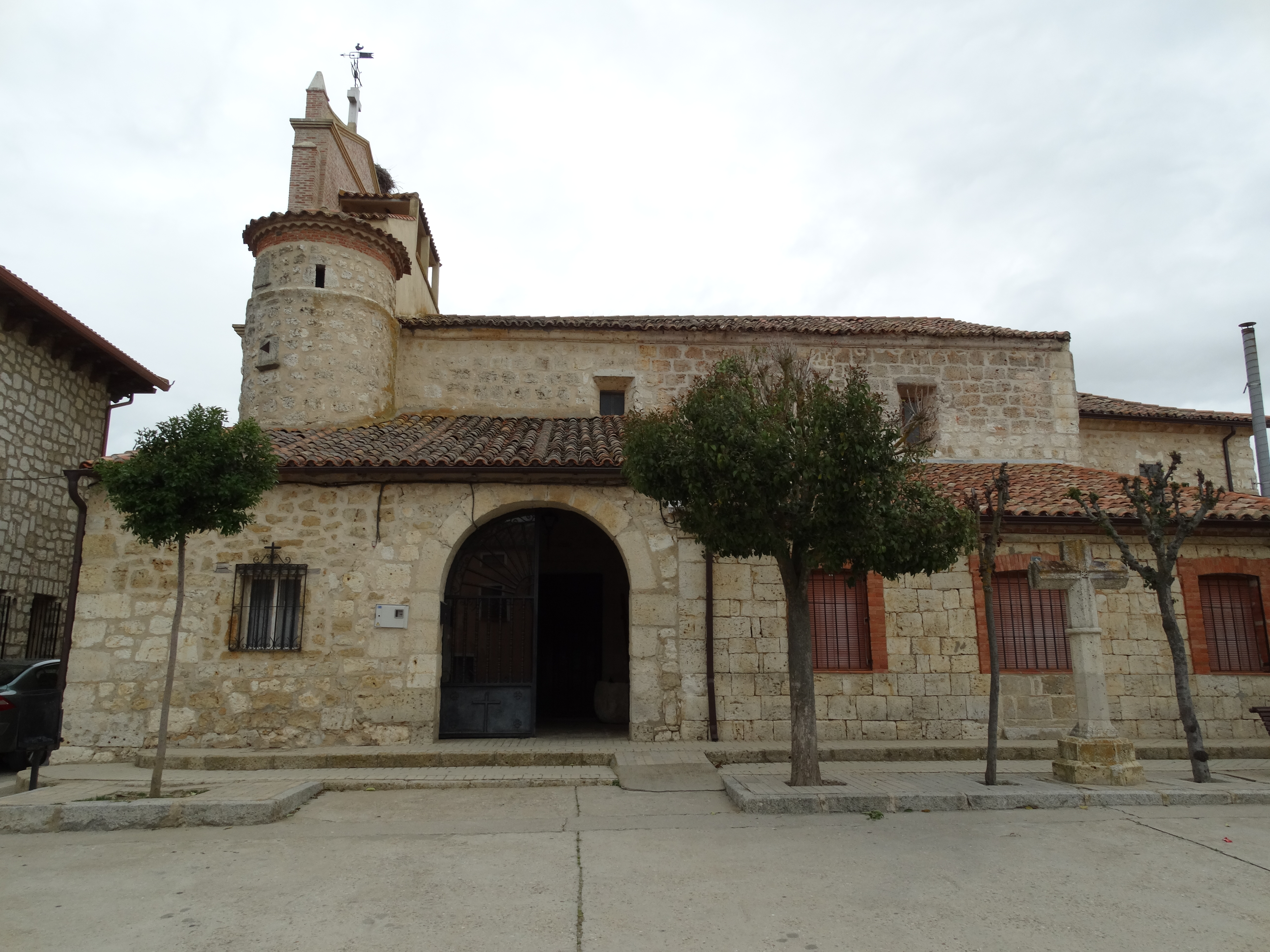

- Coat of arms
- Interactive map of La Mudarra, Spain
- Country: Spain
- Autonomous community: Castile and León
- Province: Valladolid
- Municipality: La Mudarra

Area
  - Total: 18 km^{2} (6.9 sq mi)
- Elevation: 848 m (2,782 ft)

Population (2025-01-01)
  - Total: 167
  - Density: 9.3/km^{2} (24/sq mi)
- Time zone: UTC+1 (CET)
  - Summer (DST): UTC+2 (CEST)

La Mudarra is a municipality located in the province of Valladolid, Castile and León, Spain. According to the 2004 census (INE), the municipality has a population of 247 inhabitants.

== Gallery ==
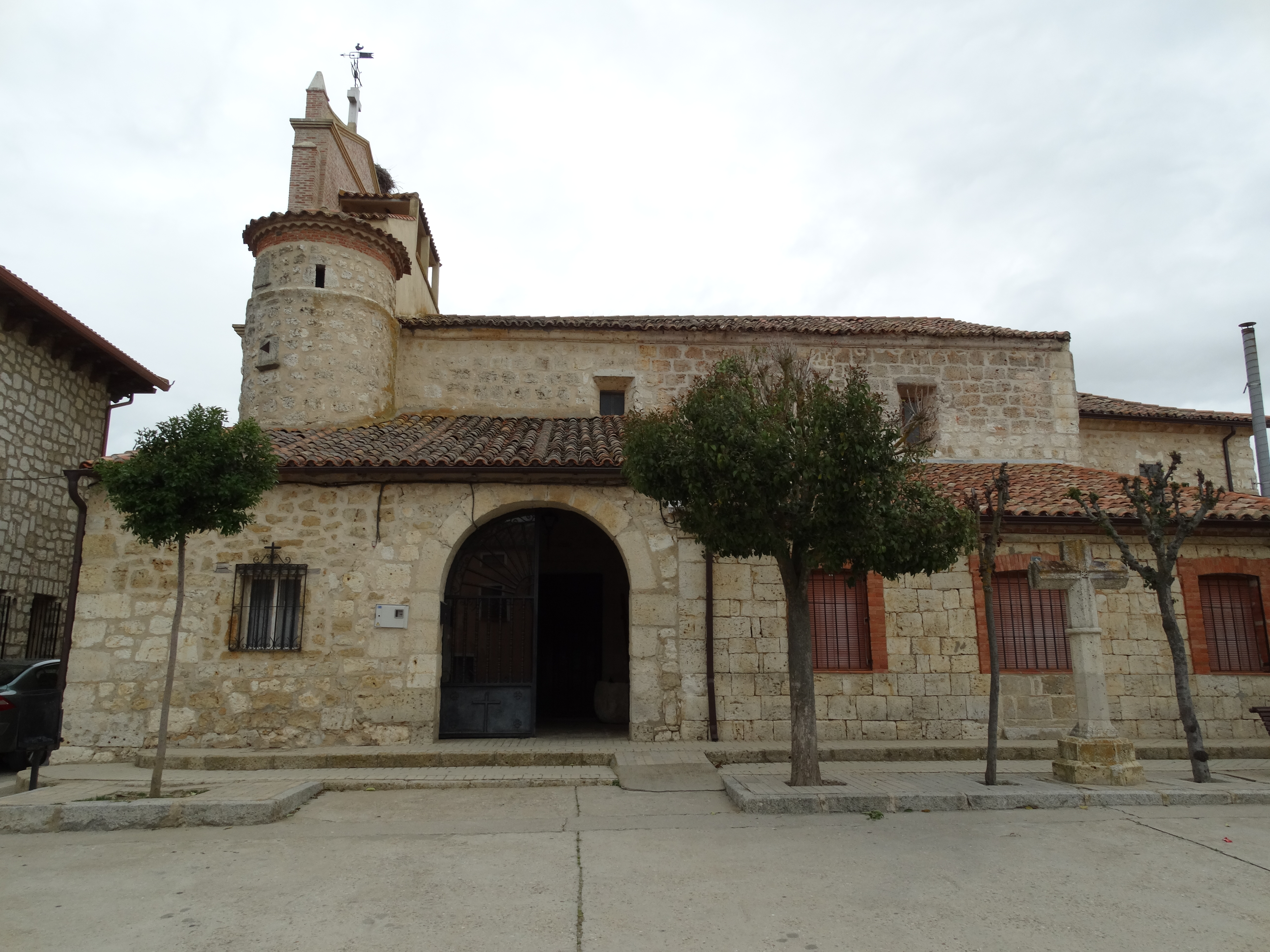
La Mudarra (Valladolid, Spain) - Parish Church of Nuestra Señora del Rosario from the 18th century, baroque. Tower with spiral staircase.

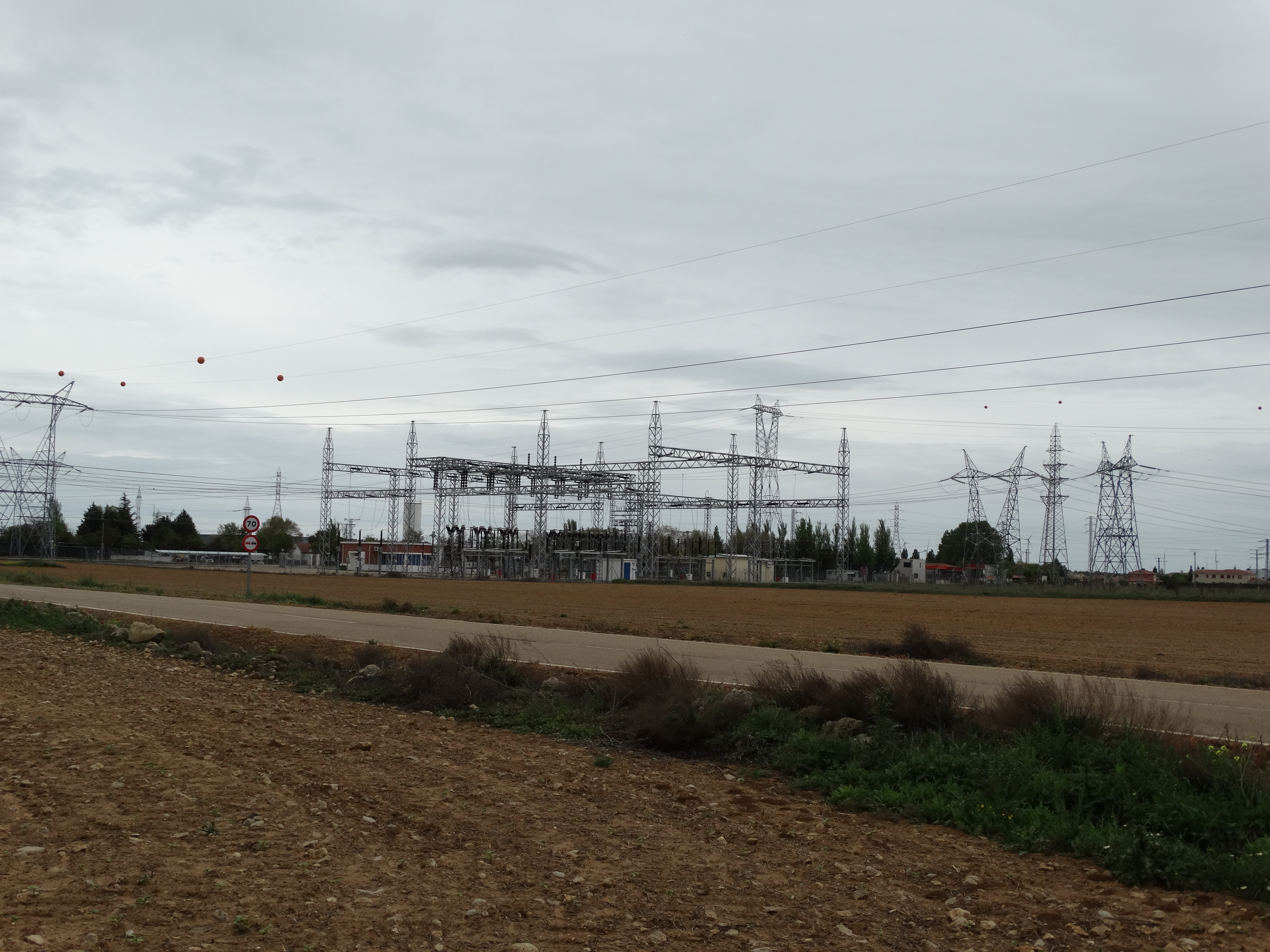
Electrical substation of La Mudarra, owned by Red Eléctrica de España.
