= Ángel Simón =

Executive president of Grupo Agbar

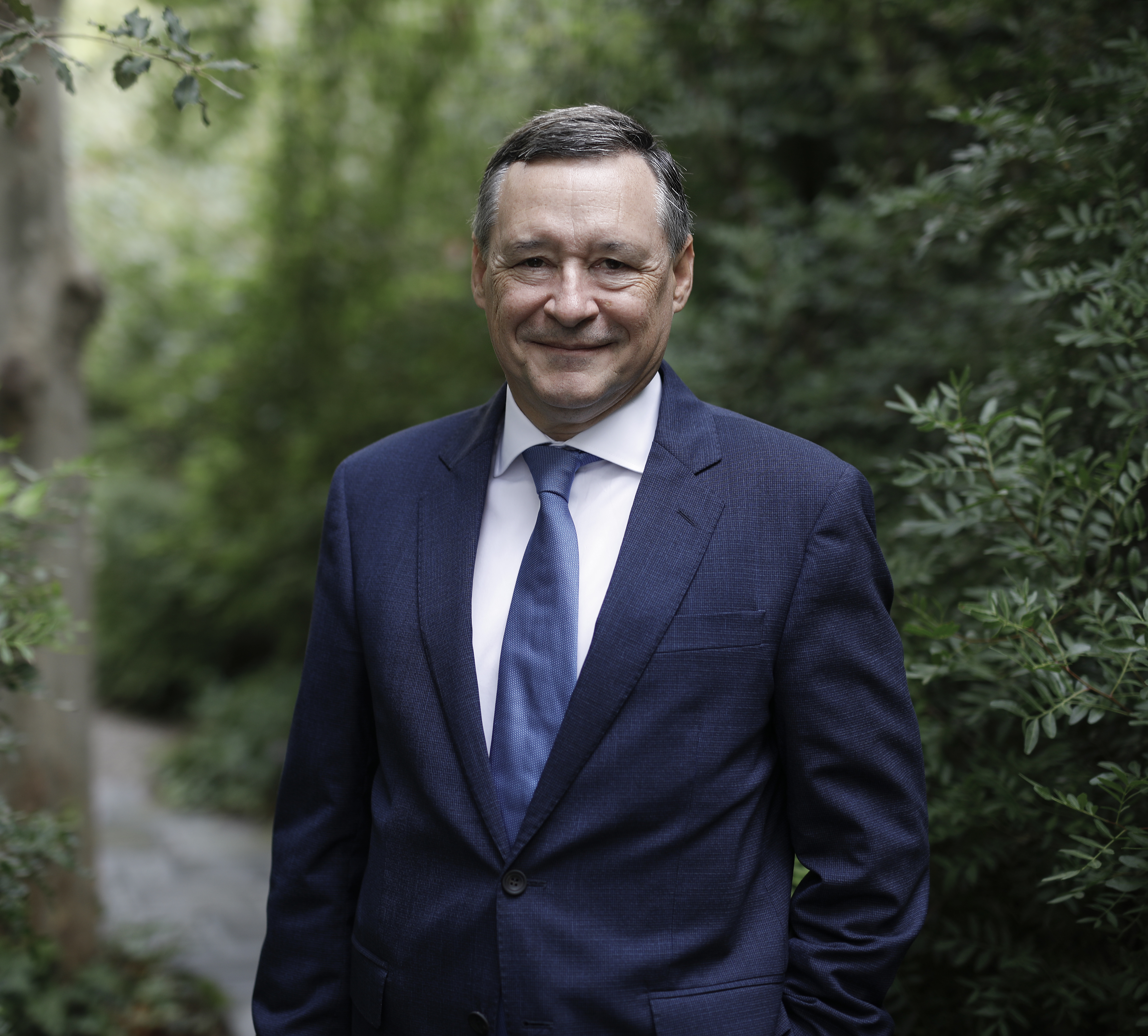
- Born: 9 November 1957 (age 68); Manresa, Spain
- Education: Polytechnic University of Catalonia and ESADE
- Website: www.angelsimon.com

Ángel Simón Grimaldos is a Spanish businessman. Since April 2026, he serves as Non-Executive Chairman of Indra Sistemas.

Previously, he was CEO of CriteriaCaixa from 2024 to 2025, and Executive President of Grupo Agbar from 2010 to 2024.

== Early career ==
Ángel Simón Grimaldos studied roads, ports and canals engineering at the Polytechnic University of Catalonia. In 1989, he became the head of the Área Metropolitana de Barcelona. He holds a degree in Civil Engineering from the Universitat Politècnica de Catalunya-BarcelonaTech (1980) and an MBA from ESADE Business School.

Between 1980 and 1989, after managing SOGEMASA, a public supply company, and Sociedad Catalana de Capital Riesgo, S.A.'s projects in the years leading up to the 1992 Olympic Games, the then mayor of Barcelona, Pasqual Maragall, appointed him to manage the Mancomunitat de Municipis de l'Àrea Metropolitana de Barcelona and the other entities that together made up Àrea Metropolitana de Barcelona (AMB) and which were replacing the Corporació Metropolitana de Barcelona following its dissolution by the Convergència i Unió government in 1987.

Driven by the preparations under way for the 1992 Olympic Games, it was a period that saw the city of Barcelona transformed thanks to projects such as the Olympic Village, the ring roads and the opening up of the coastline, as well as the implementation of projects such as the rehabilitation of the Llobregat and Besòs riverbanks, the creation of Serra de Collserola Natural Park and the Metropolitan Sanitation Plan.

== Career ==
Between 1989 and 1995, he was manager of the Àrea Metropolitana de Barcelona (AMB). He joined Agbar in 1995 and was subsequently appointed company delegate in Portugal, a country which, like Spain, signed the Treaty of Accession to the European Economic Community (EEC) on 12 June 1985, which came into force in 1986. He held the post of Agbar delegate in Portugal until 1998, when he became the Group's international general manager for the water and sanitation sector (until 1999). In 1995, he became a delegate to Grupo Agbar in Portugal. In 1998, he was named the international general director of Agbar. From 1999 to 2002, he was the head manager of Aguas Andinas, and CEO from 2002 to 2010.

In the last decade of the 20th century and into the coming decade, Agbar had a significant presence in Argentina, in cities such as Santa Fe, Córdoba, Rosario and Buenos Aires. It has been an active participant in Aguas Argentinas, a company in which it attained a 25% share, since 1993. In 2003, Agbar, together with its partners in SUEZ, filed claims before the International Centre for Settlement of Investment Disputes (ICSID) for lack of protection of its investments, returning the concession in 2005. The courts awarded compensation in favour of the shareholders amounting to around US$7 billion.

The change made to the Portuguese Constitution, which has undergone seven revisions since 1976, in 1997 opened the country up to public-private partnerships and allowed Agbar to acquire the Setúbal water service and the sanitation service in Vale do Ave. The latter was the main area of operation of the Lusaga company, which had traditionally operated the Alcanena Tannery Treatment Plant.

After three years in Portugal, in 1998 Simón took over international management of the Group's water and wastewater sector in 1998. In this post, he furthered Agbar's international reach, coinciding with the global impact Barcelona achieved following the 1992 Olympic Games. He designed and led Agbar's entry into Chile in 1999 through the acquisition of Empresa Metropolitana de Obras Sanitarias (EMOS), the country's leading company and its second to be put out to tender for public-private participation, after ESVAL. He was EMOS's first general manager following the Chilean government's transfer of this company's control to the Group. The objective at the time of the company's acquisition was to go from a 3% wastewater treatment rate to treatment of 100% of the water. The roll-out of the Zanjón de la Aguada project was one of the major undertakings. The renovation and modernisation of this waterway, which runs through the capital, Santiago, and frequently broke its banks, placed Chile at the forefront in South America and made it a benchmark. Simón remained at the Chilean company's helm for three years, during which time it was renamed Aguas Andinas following an internal process to attain greater proximity to the public.

In 2000, Agbar teamed up with Aguas de La Habana as a technological partner, becoming the first mixed company with foreign capital to manage a public service in the country. Between 2002 and 2004, Simón was CEO of the subsidiary dedicated to the water and sanitation sector in Chile. In September 2004, he was appointed managing director of the Agbar Group. In 2006, Simón led Agbar's first major European operation in the United Kingdom, Bristol Water. In October 2012, 70% of the company was sold to the Canadian investment fund CIP, with Agbar staying on as manager. In 2008, Simón became CEO of Agbar, a position he held until being named president. As CEO, he led the divestment, between 2007 and 2010, of Cespa, Applus+, ACSA, Adeslas and ASM.

In 2010, Ángel Simón became the executive President of the Spanish water treatment company Grupo Agbar. Starting in 2013, he was the senior executive vice-president of Water Europe of Suez (formerly Suez Environnement), and led the acquisition of Aguas Andinas. From 2013 to 2022, he held the position of Executive Vice President of Suez, in charge of Spain, Southern Europe and Latin America. He also became president of Aigües de Barcelona, Empresa Metropolitana de Gestió del Cicle Integral de l'Aigua, S.A. Societat General d'Aigües de Barcelona (SGAB) owns 70% of the company, Àrea Metropolitana de Barcelona (AMB) 15%, and Criteria Caixa 15%.

In 2012, Grupo Agbar created the Solidarity Fund to help families at risk of social exclusion who could not pay their water bill, working jointly with the social services of the town councils involved. This initiative was positively assessed by the Catalan Institute for the Evaluation of Public Policies (Ivàlua). Ángel Simón chairs the Agbar Foundation, which manages the Agbar Water Museum, and the Aquae Foundation, aimed at environmental education and awareness. He is also a member of the Board of Trustees of the Princess of Girona Foundation. In July 2022, the Princess of Girona Foundation Awards Ceremony was held at the Water Museum in Cornellá de Llobregat.

In 2016, he announced the sale of the water management concession of the city of Barcelona. In 2018, he stood against Podemos' proposition to "remunicipalize" Barcelona's water system.

In 2021, the French group Veolia, a world leader in resource management (water, energy and waste) and in ecological transformation, made a public offer for the acquisition of Suez shares. Following the validation by the European Commission, in January 2022, the Autorité des Marchés Financiers (AMF) published the results of Veolia's takeover bid for 95.95% of Suez's capital. Following this process of integration in Veolia, since March 2022, Ángel Simón has held the position of Senior Vice President Iberia & Latam on Veolia's Executive Committee.

In January 2024, Ángel Simón was appointed CEO of CriteriaCaixa. He retained the positions of president of Agbar but resigned as Veolia's senior vice-president for Spain and Latin America.

In April 2026, he was appointed as non-executive chairman of Indra Sistemas.

== Forced exit ==
In June 2024, a letter from the board of Veolia, authored by its General Secretary Helman le Pas de Sécheval, highlighted CriteriaCaixa and Simón's malicious maneuvers to facilitate an hostile takeover of Veolia's subsidiary Aigües de Barcelona (Agbar) by CriteriaCaixa. He immediately resigned from his role as non-executive director of Aigües de Barcelona, supposedly to avoid a lawsuit from Veolia. This humiliation permanently weakened his position at CriteriaCaixa. In April 2025, the governing body of CriteriaCaixa issued an official letter removing Simón from his managing responsibilities at the company. CriteriaCaixa had become aware of Simón's rogue attitude after he secretly pre-negotiated CriteriaCaixa's takeover on Celsa (Catalan refractory provider). Inside sources also mention escalating tensions between Simón and CriteriaCaixa's Head, Isidre Fainé.

== Distinctions ==
- June 2017: Medal of honor from the Colegio de Ingenieros de Caminos
- February 2018: Received the key to the city of Barcelona
