= Companyia d'Aigües de Sabadell =

Spanish water company

Companyia d'Aigües de Sabadell (Cassa) is a Spanish company that specializes in the distribution and treatment of water.

== History ==
Companyia d'Aigües de Sabadell was founded in 1949.

In September 1989, a group of shareholders launched a petition requesting the resignation of José Casas, President of Cassa, and Jordi Buxeda, the company's secretary.

In 1999, its revenue grew by 18%. In 2000, Aigües de Sabadell extended its services to 10 new Spanish municipalities. In 2005, the company financed the exhibition Som Aigua. La nova cultura de l'aigua presented at the Maritime Museum of Barcelona.

In 2010, the Grupo Agbar, which already owned 11,3% of Cassa, led an OPA on the Companyia d'Aigües de Sabadell, but the board replied that Sabadell's shareholders will not accept to sell. One of the board members Manuel Bustos, is also the mayor of Sabadell. In July 2013, the Grupo Agbar completed the acquisition of 78% of Aigües de Sabadell for 24 million euros.

In July 2013, the company announced the launch of a SMS alert system to warn its clients of any interruption of service.

== See also ==
- Grupo Agbar
