= Indra Sistemas =

Spanish defense and information tech company

Indra Sistemas, S.A.

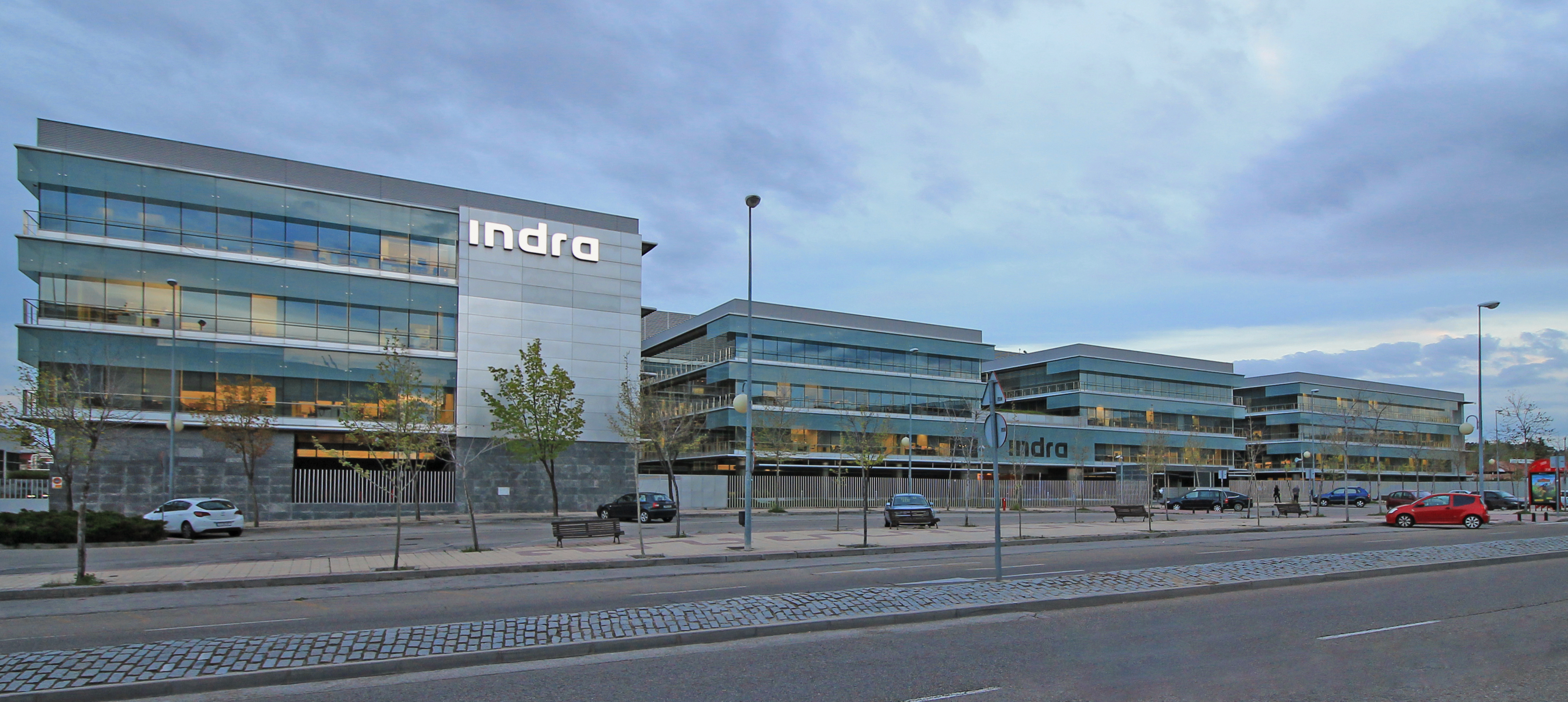
- Headquarters in Alcobendas, Spain
- Type: Public
- Traded as: BMAD: IDR; IBEX 35
- ISIN: ES0118594417
- Industry: Information technology Consulting; Outsourcing
- Founded: 1992; 34 years ago
- Headquarters: Alcobendas, Community of Madrid, Spain
- Key people: Ángel Simón, Chairman; José Vicente de los Mozos, CEO
- Services: Defence, transport, energy, telecommunications, financial services and public sector clients
- Revenue: ▲€5.46 billion (2025)
- Operating income: ▲€586 million (2025)
- Net income: ▲€439 million (2025)
- Total assets: ▲€9.13 billion (2025)
- Total equity: ▲€1.99 billion (2025)
- Number of employees: ▲62,396 (2025)
- Website: www.indracompany.com/en/

Indra Sistemas, S.A. (Spanish pronunciation: [ˈindɾa sisˈtemas]), also known as Indra Group, is a Spanish information technology, transport technology and defense company. Indra is listed on the Bolsa de Madrid and is a constituent of the IBEX 35 index.

The company operates in sectors such as transport and mobility, defense and security, air traffic management, space, public administration, financial services, energy, and telecommunications.

The non-executive chairman is Ángel Simón, since April 2026, while José Vicente de los Mozos is CEO since May 2023.

== Business areas ==
Indra structures its activities around several core business areas focused on the development and delivery of technology solutions for complex, mission-critical environments.

Mobility and transport

Mobility is one of Indra’s main business areas, focused on intelligent transport systems for urban, interurban, and rail environments. The company provides technology solutions for transport authorities and operators worldwide, including:

- Electronic fare collection and ticketing systems
- Multimodal transport management platforms
- Traffic, tunnel, and road infrastructure management systems
- Tolling and congestion charging solutions
- Rail control, supervision, and signaling support systems
- Digital mobility services, including data analytics and mobility-as-a-service (MaaS) platforms

Defense and security

Indra develops advanced technology solutions for defense and security applications, serving military and civil authorities. Its activities include:

- Radar and surveillance systems
- Electronic defense and electronic warfare solutions
- Command, control, communications, computers, intelligence, surveillance and reconnaissance (C4ISR) systems
- Simulation and training systems for defense forces

Air traffic management

The company is a global provider of air traffic management solutions for civil and military aviation, including:

- Air surveillance and radar systems
- Flight data processing and control systems
- Airspace and airport operations management platforms
- Integrated civil-military air traffic coordination systems

Digital transformation and IT services

Indra offers information technology and consulting services to support digital transformation across multiple sectors, including:

- Systems integration and software development
- Cloud and digital platform services
- Cybersecurity and identity management
- Data analytics and artificial intelligence solutions
- IT services for public administration, financial services, energy, and telecommunications

Other sectors

In addition to its core business areas, Indra delivers specialized technology solutions for:

- Energy and utilities management
- Healthcare information systems
- Electoral and public sector systems
- Industrial and infrastructure digitalization

== History ==
The company was formed as Ceselsa-Inisel S.A. upon the merge of Ceselsa and Inisel (by absorption of the latter by the former). The initial share pool was owned by INI (62%), José Antonio Pérez Nievas (20%), Sainco (4%), BBV (4%), and Paribas (3%).

In January 2025, Ángel Escribano was appointed as executive chairman in replacement of Marc Murtra, who was appointed as Telefónica chairman. Also in January 2025, Indra purchased the 89.68% of communications satellite operator Hispasat from Redeia. Later in 2025, in the context of General Dynamics European Land Systems' rejection of Indra offers for Santa Bárbara Sistemas (and its factory in La Trubia), Indra president Ángel Escribano announced plans to launch an 'Indra Land Vehicles' division and the purchase of a factory in Gijón from Duro Felguera to develop military vehicles.

In March 2026, Indra and Rheinmetall signed a strategic partnership agreement aimed towards the production of military vehicles, including the creation of a joint venture set to bid for a contract of the Spanish armed forces. It also signed an industrial collaboration agreement with the Korean company Hanwha to develop a self-propelled artillery system for the Spanish military.

In April 2026, Escribano resigned as executive chairman and Ángel Simón was appointed as non-executive chairman.

=== Irish Rail ===
In 2020, Iarnród Éireann contracted Indra to provide a traffic management system for the Irish railway network.

In May 2026, Iarnród Éireann wrote off €50 million for a failed software project after Indra missed several deadlines and the rail company's lack of confidence in the company's ability to provide software to meet the terms of the contract. Indra stated that there was insufficient specification and gaps in knowledge about existing systems and practices. The Irish parliamentary Public Accounts Committee was told that the failed Indra project had cost a "staggering amount of money" and was an "absolute scandal".

In September 2026, Iarnród Éireann formally terminated the contract, indicating it was going to seek damages from Indra. Indra stated that failed deliveries resulted from ineffective management by Iarnród Éireann.

== Revenues ==
About a third of the company's annual revenues come from international markets. By geographical areas, Europe and the United States are the two international markets with the greatest weight and growth for Indra. Indra is operating also in Latin America.

== Shareholder structure ==
As of 6 May 2026, this is the current shareholder structure of the company:

Society	Shares
Free float	48.3%
(Spain) Sociedad Estatal de Participaciones Industriales	28.00%
(Spain) SAPA	7.94%
(United Kingdom) Amber Capital	7.24%
(United States) T. Rowe Price	5.01%
(United States) D. E. Shaw & Co.	3.51%
