= José María Álvarez-Pallete =

Spanish economist

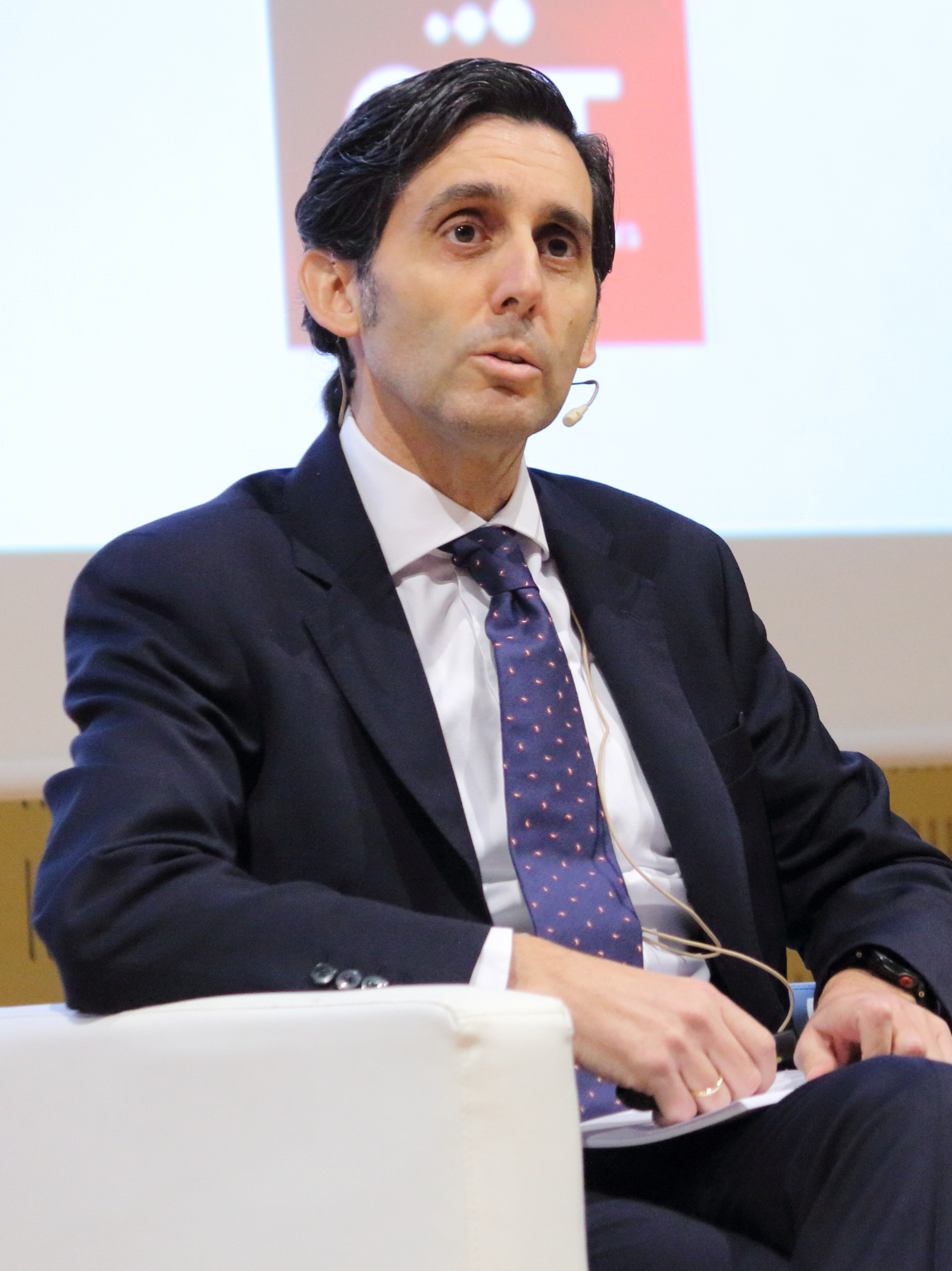

Former executive chairman of Telefónica

José María Álvarez-Pallete López

Personal details
- Born: 12 December 1963 (age 62) Madrid, Spain
- Occupation: Economist, director

José María Álvarez-Pallete López (born 12 December 1963, Madrid) is a Spanish economist and chief executive officer of Telefónica S.A. from 8 April 2016 to January 2025, when he was replaced by Marc Murtra.

== Professional career ==
José María Álvarez-Pallete began his professional career at Arthur Young Auditors in 1987, before joining Benito & Monjardín/Kidder, Peabody & Co. in 1988. After this, in 1995, he joined the Compañía Valenciana de Cementos Portland (CEMEX) as head of the Investor Relations and Analysis Department.

In 1996, he was promoted to chief financial officer in Spain, and in 1998 to chief administration and finance officer of the CEMEX Group Indonesia and to member of the board of CEMEX Asia Ltd.

In February 1999, he joined the Telefónica Group as de of Telefónica Internacional SA, and on September of that same year he took up the post of managing director of the corporate & finance in Telefónica S.A. In July 2002, he was appointed executive chairman of Telefonica International S.A., in July 2006, managing director of Latin America Telefonica, and in March 2009, president of Latin America Telefonica. In September 2011, he was promoted to chief executive officer (CEO) of Telefónica Europe; at that time, he developed Wayra, the accelerator of Startup Company in Latin America and Spain.

He is managing director of Telefónica S.A. since 17 September 2012, and he became also a member of the administrative board of Telefónica S.A. in July 2006. In addition to this, he is a member of the Executive Committee of Telefónica.

On 20 March 2016, César Alierta left the position of chief executive officer (CEO) of Telefónica S.A. and named José Maria Álvarez-Pallete as his successor, who took up the CEO position on 8 April 2016,

Since March 2019 he is member of the Advisory Council of SEAT, S.A.

In January 2022, he was appointed president of the GSM Association (GSMA) succeeding the president of Orange, Stéphane Richard.

In February 2022, José María Álvarez-Pallete assumes the presidency of Fundación Telefónica, replacing César Alierta.

In November 2022, he was re-elected as President of the GSMA and will hold the position until the end of 2024.

In June 2023, Álvarez Pallete takes over as chairman of the board of Virgin Media O2, Telefónica's British subsidiary. He succeeds Liberty Global CEO Mike Fries, who has held the seat for the company's first two years.

In 2025 a new shareholder structure named Marc Murtra executive chairman of Telefónica.

== Other activities ==
=== Corporate boards ===
- Endeavor, member of the board of directors
- Portugal Telecom, member of the board of directors (2008–2010)

=== Non-profit organizations ===
- Elcano Royal Institute for International and Strategic Studies, member of the board of trustees
- European Round Table of Industrialists (ERT), member
- Museo Nacional Centro de Arte Reina Sofía, member of the board of trustees

== Awards and recognition ==
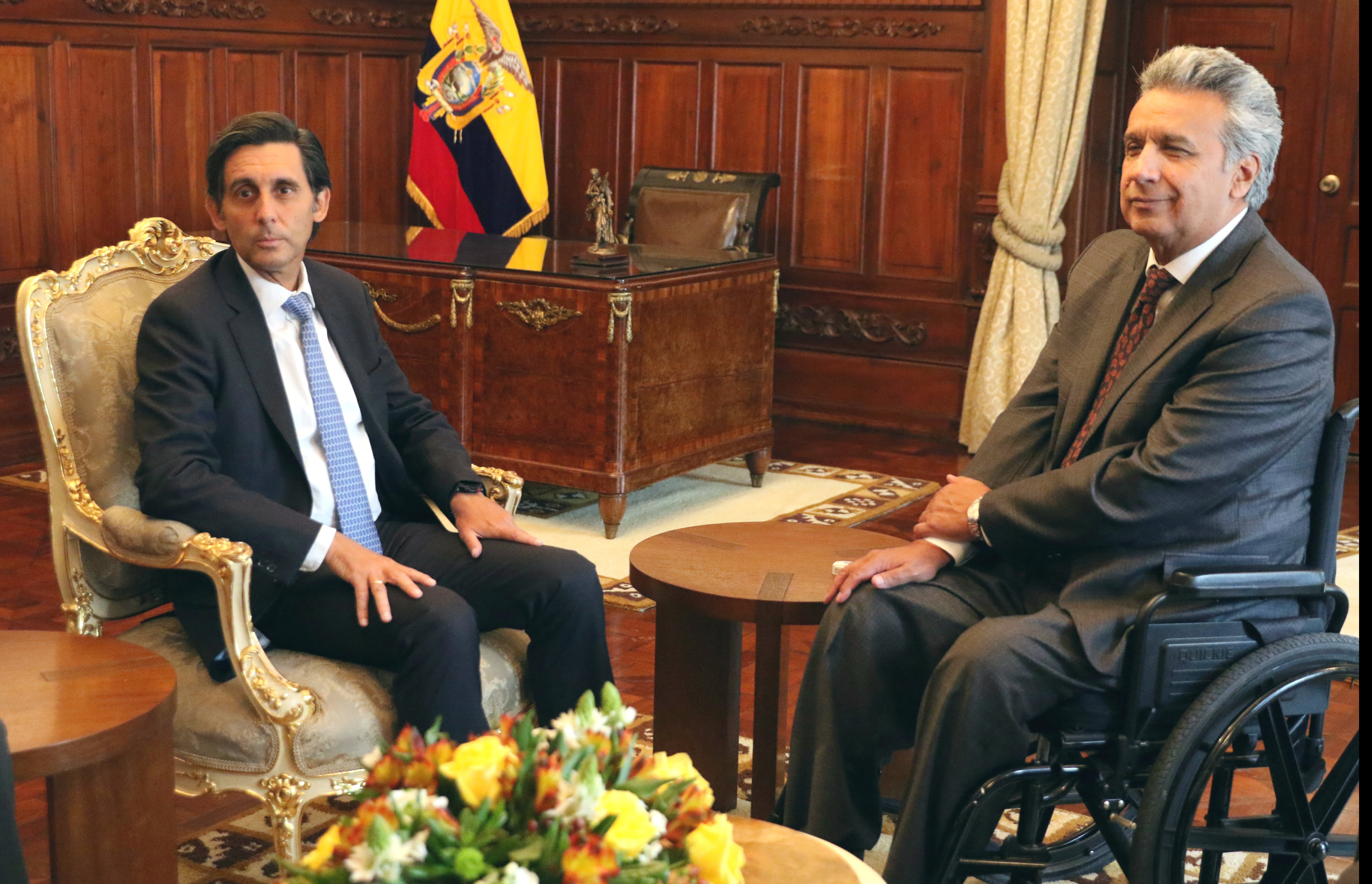
Álvarez-Pallete with Lenin Moreno, president of Ecuador, in 2017.

- 2001 – Best “CFO Europe Best Practices” award in the Mergers & Acquisitions category for the year 2000
- 2003 – Member of Merit at the Ibero-American Forum of the Fundación Carlos III
- 2007 – Master of Gold of the High Direction Forum
- 2011 – Economics Person of the Year, awarded by the journal El Economista
- 2013 – Received the Excellence 2013 Award, for his contribution to the development of telecommunications, granted by the Spanish Telecommunication Engineers Association
- 2014 – Sorolla Medal, awarded by the Hispanic Society of America
- 2014 – Innovative Corporate Leader of the Year, awarded by the Latin Trade Magazine
- 2014 – Most Creative People, listed by Fast Company Magazine
- 2016 – The Consejo Superior de Deportes granted him the entry in the Royal Order of Merit Sports in the category of Bronze Medal
- 2017 – Forbes magazine recognized José María Álvarez-Pallete as the best CEO of companies that quoted in Spain in 2016
- 2019 – He received the "Manager of the Year" award in the Large Corporations category granted by the Asociación Española de Directivos
- 2019 – He received the "Executive of the Year" award in the second edition of the awards for economic, social and business excellence by Merca2
- 2019 – “Business Leader of the Year” by the Spain-US Chamber of Commerce
- 2020 – ECOFIN prize for "Financiero del Año"
- 2020 – "Lider Empresarial Impulsor del Marketing" by the Spanish Marketing Association
- 2022 – He received the award "Mejor Empresario del Año" from Actualidad Económica, economic supplement of El Mundo.
- 2023 – Doctor "Honoris Causa" by the CEU San Pablo University.
- 2023 – José María Álvarez-Pallete receives the León Award from El Español for Business Management 2023.
- 2024 – Americas Society Gold Medal for its strategic vision and ongoing commitment to innovation.

== See also ==
- Telefónica
