= Rafael Villaseca =

Spanish businessman (born 1951)

- Awards: Grand Cross of the Cross of Military Merit with White Decoration (1991)

Rafael Villaseca Marco (born 1951 in Barcelona) is a Spanish business executive and the current CEO of Gas Natural, a post he has held since January 2005. Prior to his tenure at Gas Natural, he served at Enagás as CEO, Panrico as managing director, and Chairman of Indra Sistemas, Amper SA, Club Español de la Energía, Círculo de Economía, and IESE Business School. He graduated from IESE Business School and Polytechnic University of Catalonia.
