= César Alierta =

Spanish businessman (1945–2024)

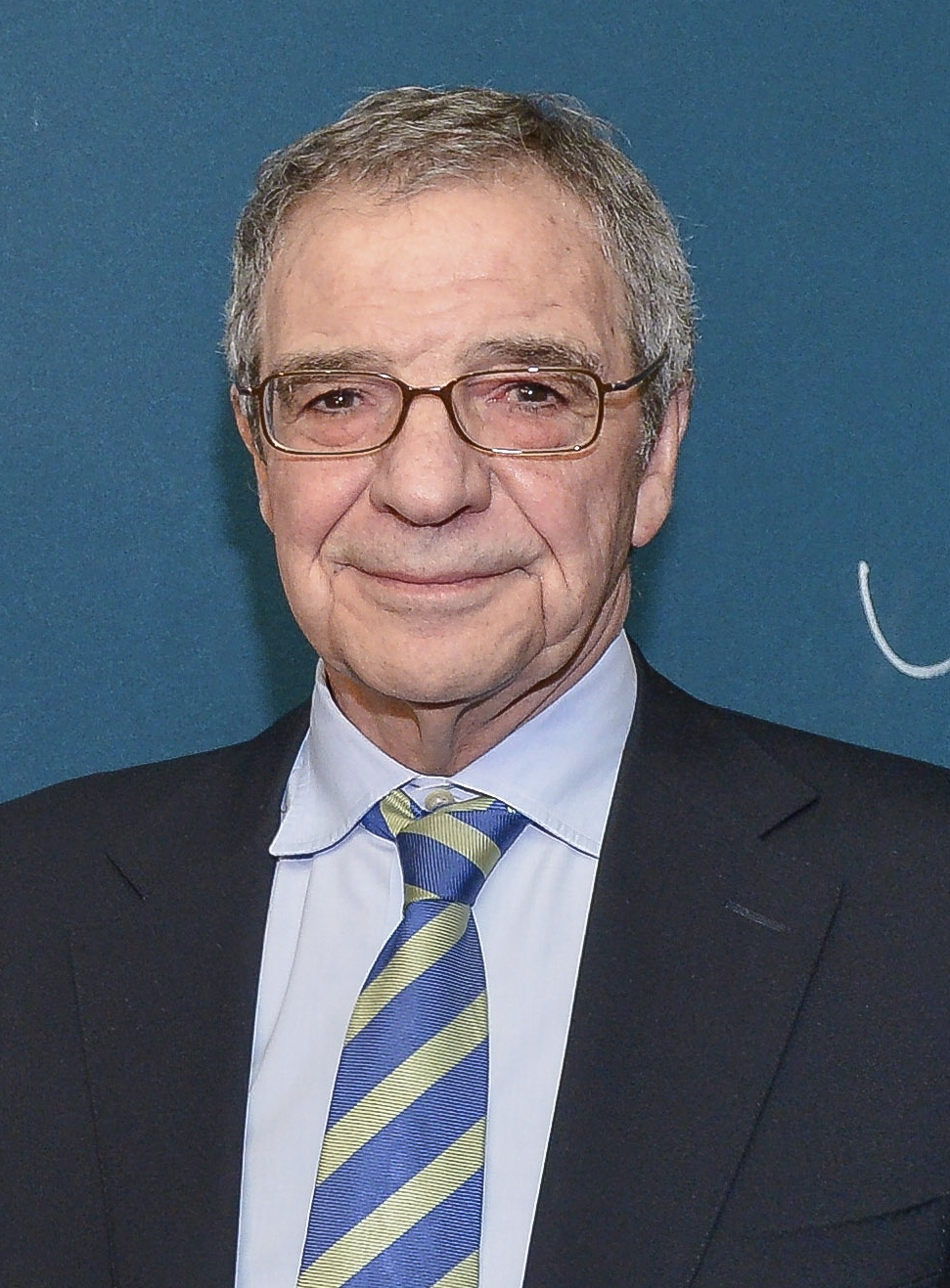
- Alierta in 2014
- Born: César Alierta Izuel; 5 May 1945; Zaragoza, Spain
- Died: 10 January 2024 (aged 78); Zaragoza, Spain
- Education: Universidad de Zaragoza; Columbia Business School
- Occupation: Businessman
- Years active: 1970–2024
- Employer: Telefónica S.A.
- Board member of: Telefonica; China Unicom (H.K.)
- Spouse: Ana Cristina Placer (died 2015)

César Alierta Izuel (5 May 1945 – 10 January 2024) was a Spanish businessman, who was the chief executive officer and chairman of Telefónica S.A. from 26 July 2000, until replaced by José María Álvarez-Pallete in 2016. He guided the company through a significant Latin American expansion. Alierta earned a bachelor's degree in law at the Universidad de Zaragoza (Spain) in 1967. Three years after his degree, he earned a master's degree in Business Administration at Columbia University in New York, United States.

== Career ==
Alierta held law degree from the University of Zaragoza and an MBA from Columbia Business School.

- 1970–1985: Banco Urquijo (Financial Analyst)
- 1985–1996: Beta Capital (Founder & President)
- 1996–1999: Tabacalera (CEO)
- 1999–2000: Altadis (Co-chairman)
- 2000–2016: Telefónica (CEO & Chairman)

== Main highlights of his presidency at Telefónica ==
In September 2005, Alierta received the Global Spanish Entrepreneur award in New York, by the Spain-US Chamber of Commerce. This distinction is an acknowledgement of his job as president of Telefónica, leading the firm to entry into the Dow Jones Global Titans 50 index. In fact, Telefónica is the first Spanish company -and one of the very few in Europe - to be part of that index, made of the world's 50 most successful, global and largest companies.

In April 2008, he was named president of the Social Council of the Universidad Nacional de Educación a Distancia (UNED), Spanish main open university, with over 100,000 students.

In September 2009 he led one of the main global strategic alliances, putting together Telefónica with Chinese firm China Unicom[1]. Both companies agreed to invest in each other an amount of a billion dollars. The most important part of the cooperation agreement involves research, development and innovation, as well as sharing information on knowledge management and new technologies. This alliance allowed Telefónica to strengthen its position as market leader. It also expanded its client base to over 550 million worldwide, including the clients of its Chinese partner.

In 2009 he was awarded the Tiepolo prize. This award is given by the Madrid-Italy Chamber of Commerce and acknowledges the role of Telefónica as one of the leading Spanish global companies.

Also in 2009, the business association Aragón Exterior (Aragonex) acknowledged him as one of the main Aragonese businessmen with a global reach.

In June 2010, he was awarded the Gold Medal of the Council of the Americas in New York, for his contribution to the growth and development in Latin America. He was the first Spaniard, and the first non-American citizen, to be awarded by the institution. The award is presented to those who work for the progress and advancement of the continent (source: Europa Press). (source:EFE) In June 2010, the President of Telefónica was rated as the best chief executive officer (CEO) of Spain by Thomson Extel Survey 2010.

On 17 September 2010, the City Council of Zaragoza awarded César Alierta the Gold Medal of the city. The medal was awarded on 9 October to mark the start of the "Fiestas del Pilar".

On 28 September 2010, he joined the Board of the company resulting from the merger between Iberia and British Airways, International Airlines Consolidate Group (IAG). He became, as well, Chairman of the Remuneration Committee and member of the Nomination Committee.

In June 2012 the German Chamber of Commerce for Spain awarded César Alierta the Hispanic-German Prize to Business Excellence, for having succeeded in placing the company among the world's telecommunication industry leaders, with a very prominent presence in Germany through O2, a subsidiary of Telefonica.

In September 2012, Alierta was awarded the Heraldo Prize 2012.

In November 2012, César Alierta was awarded the Excellence of Business Management by the IX Aragon's Business Forum.

In January 2013, Alierta was included among the twelve most prominent Spaniards in 2012 by the Spanish magazine "Tiempo".

== Alierta's vision on Communications ==
Declarations to the press had been very controversial in Spain, as Alierta suggested charging content providers, application developers and even search engines. Textual declarations include: "we do everything and they (developers, content providers, search engines...) only have the algorithms", "we've opened an opportunity for clever people to generate applications using our communication channels... and we are lucky to own millions of customers that can use them. We will charge for that", "Cloud computing means that the intelligence is in the net. And the net is ours".

== Problems with Justice ==
According to The Wall Street Journal: "A Spanish court found that César Alierta, chairman of Telefónica SA, enriched himself through insider trading before he joined the telecom company, but it acquitted him on the ground that the statute of limitations had run out".

According to Answers.com: "The charges stemmed from 1997, when Alierta and his wife had formed an investment company that they later sold to their nephew. The investment company purchased a large number of Tabacalera shares immediately preceding the purchase of Havatampa and the subsequent rise in tobacco prices, both of which led to an increase in the value of Tabacalera shares. In early 1998 the investment company sold these shares at a great profit".

== Death ==
Alierta died of respiratory failure on 10 January 2024, at the age of 78.

== See also ==
- José María Álvarez-Pallete
- Telefónica
