= Marc Murtra =

Spanish engineer and entrepreneur

- Born: Marc Thomas Murtra Millar; 1972 (age 53–54); Blackburn, Lancashire, England
- Occupations: Business executive, engineer
- Employer: Executive chairman of Telefónica
- Known for: Former executive chairman of Indra Sistemas, 2021–2025
- Children: 3

Marc Thomas Murtra Millar (born 1972), better known as Marc Murtra, is a British-born, Spanish engineer and businessman. Since January 2025, he has been the executive Chairman of Telefónica. From 2021 to 2025, he was President of Indra Sistemas. He is also a board member of Fundació Bancaria "la Caixa".

== Early life and education ==
The son of a cardiothoracic surgeon, he was born and raised in Blackburn, England. He moved to Barcelona and studied industrial engineering and specialized in Machine Mechanics at Polytechnic University of Catalonia. Afterwards, he completed his studies with an MBA in New York, at the Leonard N. Stern School of Business, where he learned from economists such as Paul Krugman and Paul Samuelson, among others.

== Career ==
He started working as a nuclear industry engineer at British Nuclear Fuels Ltd in the UK, and continued as a strategy consultant at DiamondCluster, where he worked for large technology companies.

In 2003, he was appointed director of local radio station Ràdio Estel, then, later, manager of Barcelona Televisió local public broadcasting agency.

Between 2006 and 2011, he held various public sector appointments, including manager of social services at Barcelona City Council, general director of Red.es (2006) and chief of staff of Joan Clos, then Minister of Industry (2006–2008).

In 2011, he returned to the private sector, forming investment company Crea Inversión. In 2020, he became managing partner of investment company Closa Investment Bankers. He also became an adjunct professor of finance and business at Pompeu Fabra University, Barcelona, in 2017.

He has served on the boards of several organizations, including La Caixa, Paradores de Turismo de España, and Inteco, (later The National Cybersecurity Institute (INCIBE)). Between 2018 and 2025, he authored a monthly op-ed column for La Vanguardia.

In 2021, he was appointed chairman of Indra Sistemas, as proposed by the Government of Spain. In 2025, he was succeeded by Ángel Escribano at Indra.

In January 2025, Murtra was appointed executive chairman of Telefónica, succeeding José María Álvarez-Pallete, and tasked with adapting the company to its new shareholding structure while developing new strategy and lobbying regulators to lessen barriers to European telecom mergers.

== Personal life ==
He is the father of three children.
