= Correos =

Spanish government post-service company

Sociedad Estatal Correos y Telégrafos, S.A., S.M.E.

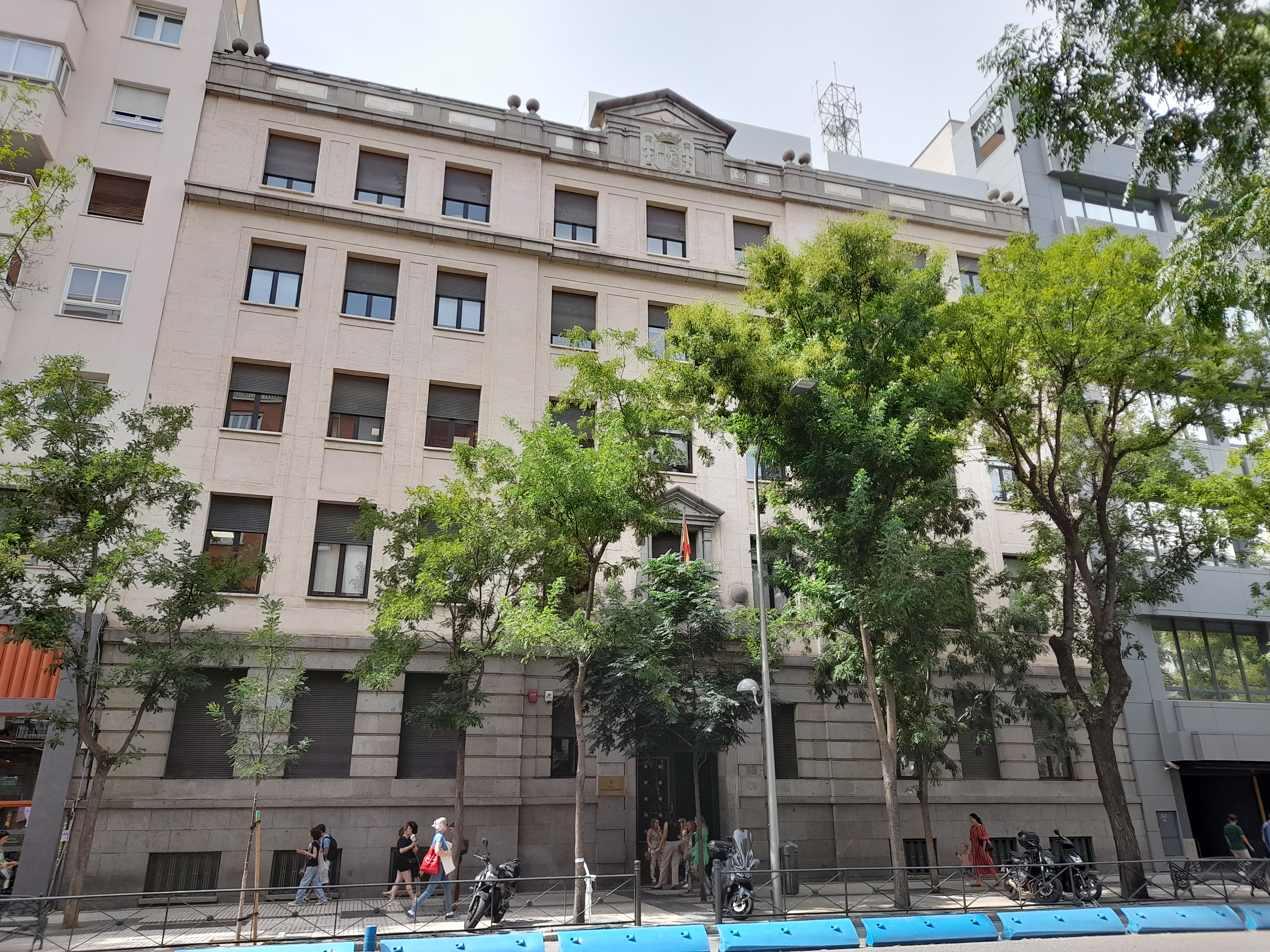
- Main headquarters in Conde de Peñalver Street
- Trade name: Correos
- Type: Sociedad anónima Sociedad mercantil estatal
- Industry: Postal services, courier
- Predecessor: Entidad Pública Empresarial Correos y Telégrafos
- Founded: 1716; 310 years ago
- Headquarters: Madrid, Spain
- Services: Letter post, parcel service, EMS, delivery, freight forwarding, third-party logistics
- Owner: Sociedad Estatal de Participaciones Industriales
- Number of employees: 53,065 (2018)
- Website: correos.es

Sociedad Estatal de Correos y Telégrafos, S.A., S.M.E. (Note: S.A. stands for Sociedad Anónima; S.M.E. stands for Sociedad Mercantil Estatal (State Trading Company).) (lit. 'State Postal and Telegraph Company'), trading under the name Correos (Spanish pronunciation: [koˈreos], "packages"), is a state-owned postal service and courier for Spain and Andorra, the latter bilateral with French-equivalent La Poste. Based in Madrid, it is one of the largest postal services in the world. Across Spain, it has more than 53,000 employees, over 10,000 branches and sends 5.4 billion pieces of mail each year.

Correos dates back to 1716, a dynasty change in Spain ended the tradition of giving the duty to take care of postal services to notable families. On 8 July 1716, King Philip V appointed Juan Tomás de Goyeneche as Chief Superintendent and General Administrator of the Postal Offices, making the State responsible postal services.

The company is 100% state owned, through the SEPI Group. Its subsidiaries are Correos Express (express mail); Correos Express Portugal (express parcel delivery in Portugal) and Correos Telecom for telecommunication infrastructure.

== History ==
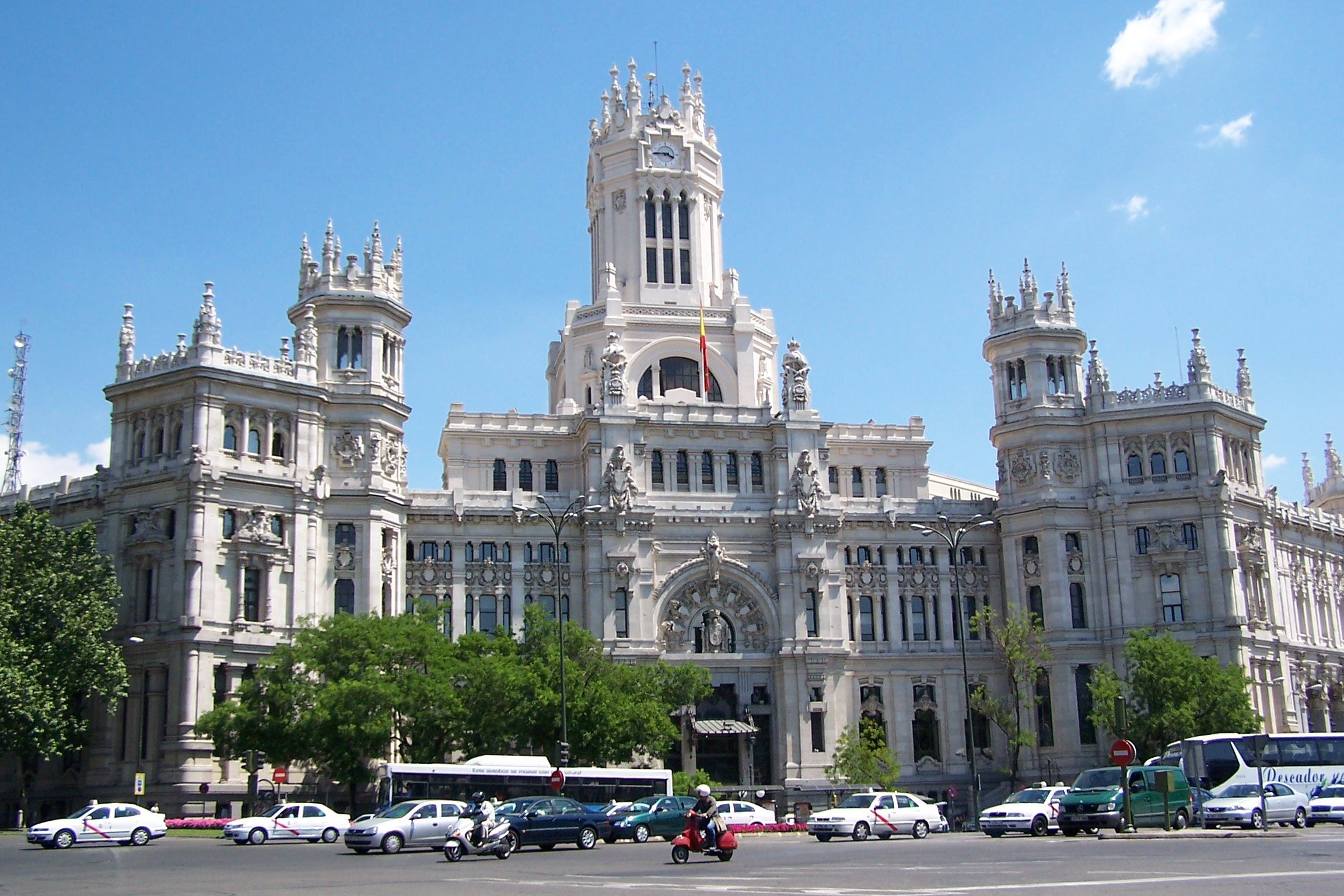
Cybele Palace, former Correos headquarters and current seat of the City Council of Madrid.

One of the great developments in postal history during the nineteenth century was the invention of the postage stamp for the payment of shipments. The first stamps were issued in the United Kingdom, but many countries began soon after. In Spain, the first stamps were implemented on 1 January 1850, with face values ranging from 6 quarters for simple letters to 10 real for heavier certificates and international items. All stamps featured an image of the monarch. The last step for the final reorganization of mail came in 1889 with the creation of the Body of Postal Workers, organized as a pyramid structure.

Coinciding with the reforms of the mid-nineteenth century, liberal governments launched the telegraph service. Following the French example, Spain had developed a line drawing of optical telegraphy between 1844 and 1855, for the exclusive use of the State. From that date, was developing the electrotelegráfica network that joined in 1863 and all provincial capitals with Madrid. At the end of the century the number of telegraph offices open to the public amounted to fifteen hundred. This new system revolutionized the world of communications, reducing the time the message took to arrive to a few minutes.

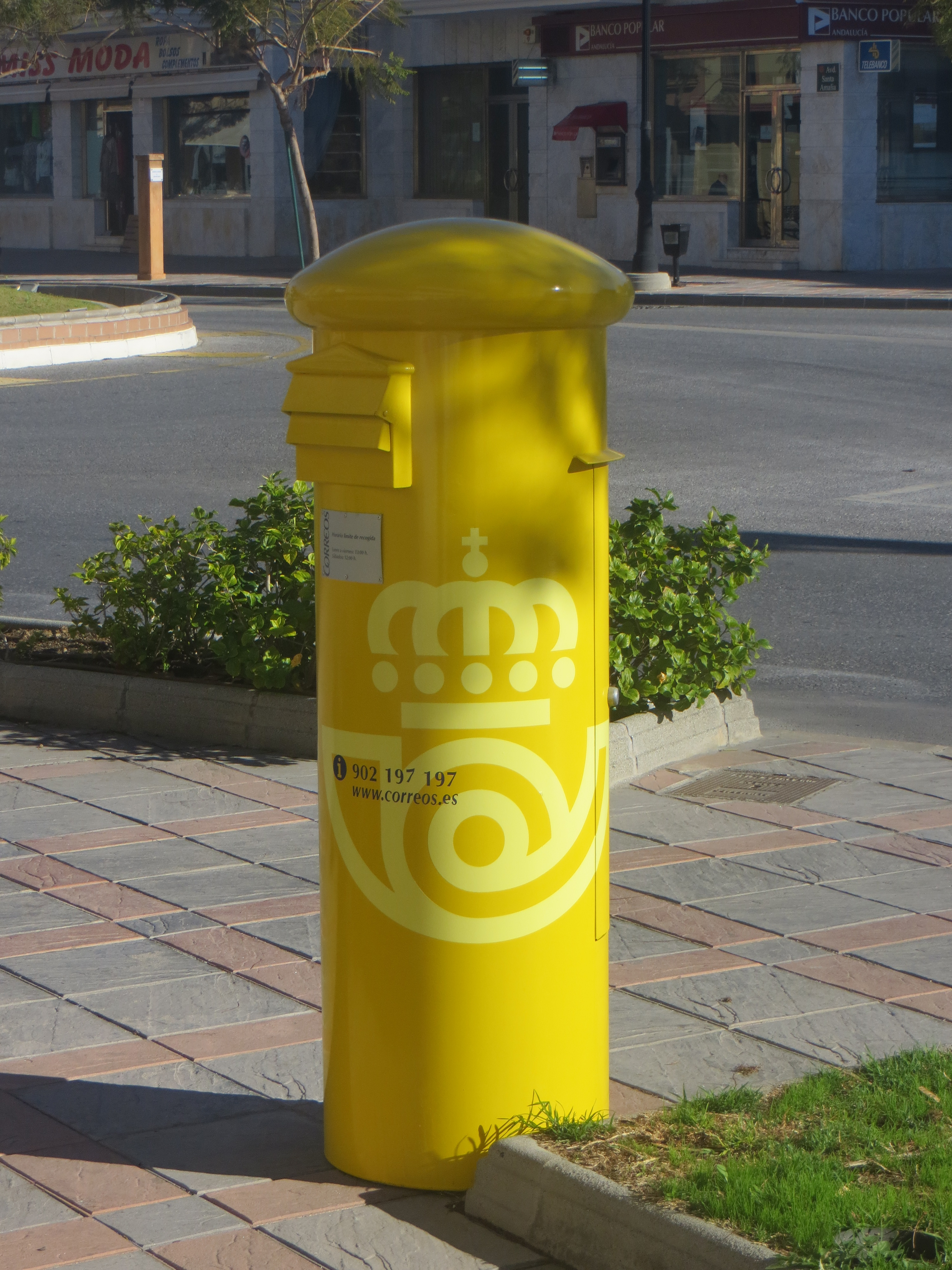
Typical format of Correos mailboxes, found all over Spain

Progress throughout the nineteenth century was consolidated during the 20th century with new technologies, new transportation, new services and a strong vocation of public utility caused the widespread use of email. The advent of the automobile and the airplane subsequently changed structures and accelerated postal delivery of correspondence and in 1899 the first post-road driving in the province of Navarra opened, and seven years later the central government in Madrid had already vehicle 16 for transporting the mail. In 1919, the airmail service was created by decree in Spain, which a year later created the first Spanish Airmail lines joining Barcelona Alicante and Málaga, Seville Larache, Barcelona and Palma de Mallorca Malaga Melilla. However, the railway remained the principal means of carrying letters and packages throughout the peninsula until 1993 when the train service gave way to transport by road of the model.

In parallel, Correos has been modernized through an ongoing process to provide new services throughout the century to citizens, such as express mail (1905), the Postal Savings Bank, on delivery reimbursement and Parcel Post (1916), the Postal Express (1981).

== European projects ==
As part of its R&D initiatives, Correos is participating in several European projects, this includes:

- Leveraging eID in the Private Sector (LEPS). Project developed through a Connecting Europe Facility grant (CEF Telecom) from September 2017 to November 2018. This project seeks to simplify the connection of private services with European public identification nodes (eIDAS nodes)
- Lightweight Infrastructure for Global Heterogeneous Trust management in support of an open ecosystem of stakeholders and trust schemes (LIGHTest). Project developed through a grant Horizon 2020 (H2020) from September 2016 to September 2019. It aims to create a global infrastructure that facilitates the verification of trust in electronic transactions. Correos participates as an industrial partner, developing two pilots of its digital services that serve as proof of integration with the resulting infrastructure.

== See also ==
- Postal Union of the Americas, Spain and Portugal
- List of national postal services#Europe
