= Grupo Agbar =

Spanish water company

Sociedad General de Aguas de Barcelona, SA

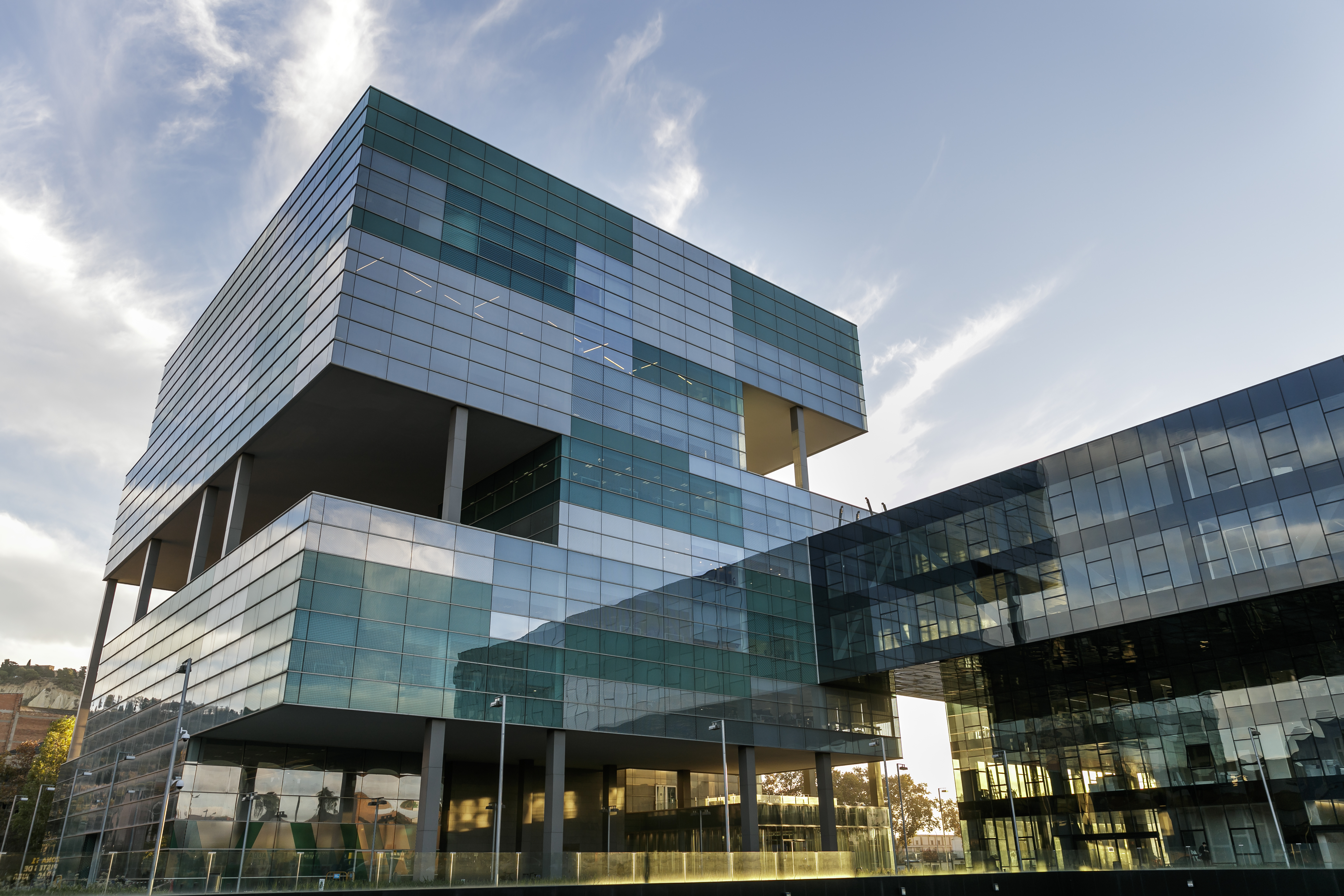
- Type: Sociedad Anónima
- Traded as: BMAD: AGS
- Industry: Utilities
- Founded: Liège, Belgium (1867)
- Headquarters: Barcelona, Spain
- Key people: Rafael Villaseca, Chairman and CEO
- Services: Water treatment and Water supply
- Revenue: €167.3 million (2006)
- Owner: Suez Environnement and CaixaBank
- Number of employees: 25,000 (2006)
- Subsidiaries: Aguas Andinas
- Website: www.agbar.es/en

Grupo Agbar, formerly Aigües de Barcelona, is a Spanish water utility company. Since 2022, it has been part of Veolia.

The company currently operates water treatment and water supply services in Spain and Latin America, operating in Chile through its subsidiary Aguas Andinas.

== History ==
The history of the group dates back to 1867, when the "Compagnie des Eaux de Barcelone" was founded in Liège to supply water to towns near Barcelona (what are now neighbourhoods of the city) through the Dosrius aqueduct. The company was acquired by French and later Catalan investors. The latter changed the company's name to "Sociedad General de Aguas de Barcelona" in 1919.

The Agbar Group was established in 1975, covering economic sectors as diverse as drinking water supply, sanitation and construction. Subsequently, its activities were expanded to the fields of healthcare, technical vehicle inspection and tax collection.

In 2008, Agbar ceased to be listed on the Spanish stock market and on the IBEX 35, following the joint takeover bid by the French group Suez (holding 56%) and Criteria Caixa, the CaixaBank investment group and former majority shareholder (with the remaining 44%). In 2010, Agbar became a subsidiary of Hisusa (Holding de Infraestructuras y Servicios Urbanos, S.A.), with Suez Environnement holding 75.74% of this holding company and Criteria Caixa 24.26%. During the transaction, Agbar divested itself of its shares in Adeslas. In 2014, Suez Environnement (renamed Suez in 2015) acquired 100% of Agbar, after signing an agreement with Criteria Caixa for the sale of its 24.26%, in exchange for a 4.1% stake in the French group's capital. Agbar became one of the subsidiaries of Suez Spain for complete water cycle management.

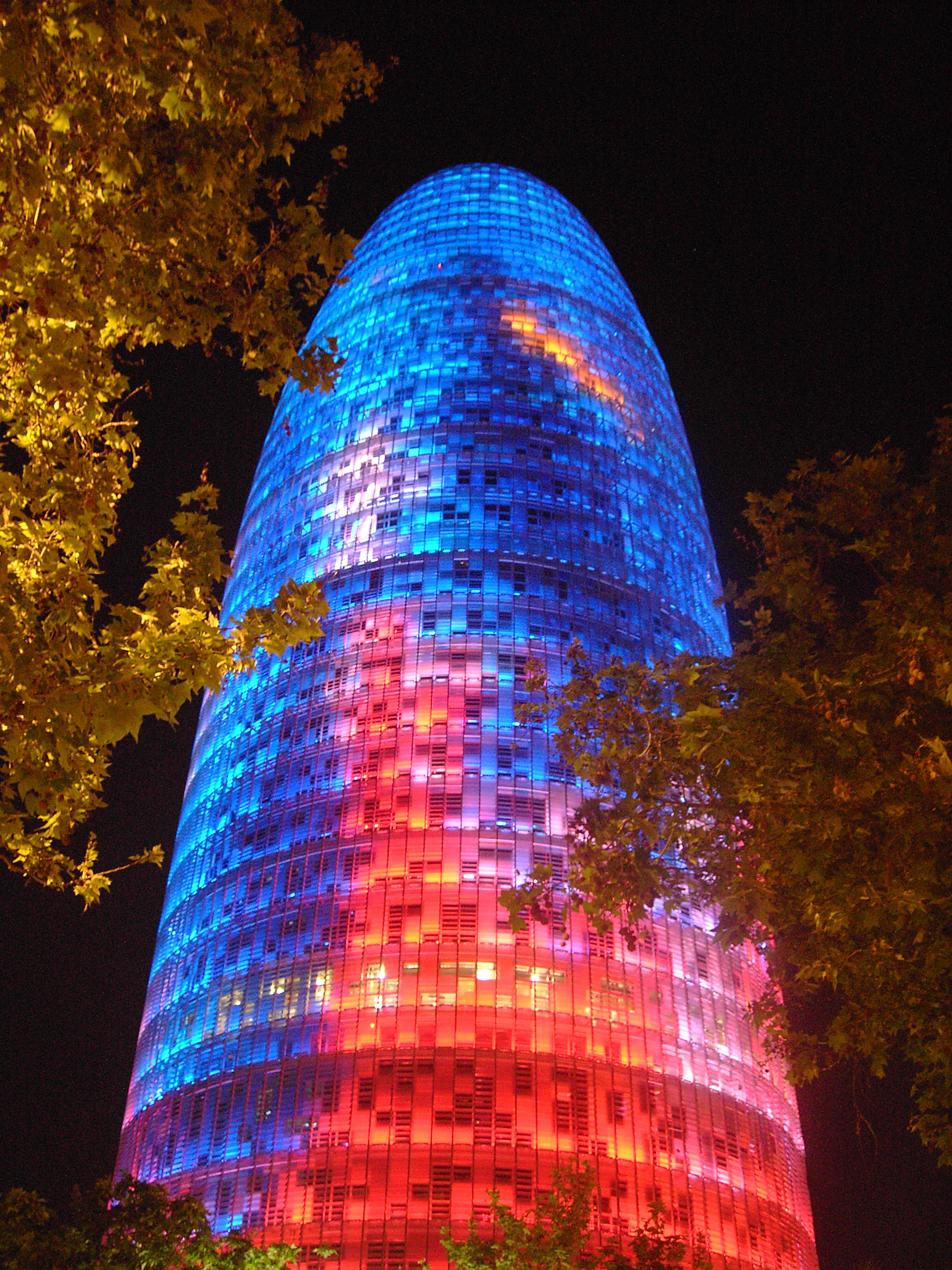
Torre Agbar

From 2005 to 2017, the group's headquarters was the Torre Agbar in Barcelona.

At the start of 2022, the Veolia Group, active in water and waste management and energy services, launched a takeover bid for Suez, taking control of 86.22% of its shareholding, a percentage that would be increased to 95.95% after the closing of its complementary offer to acquire the shares that had not participated in its initial takeover bid.
