= Sociedad Estatal de Participaciones Industriales =

Spanish public enterprise

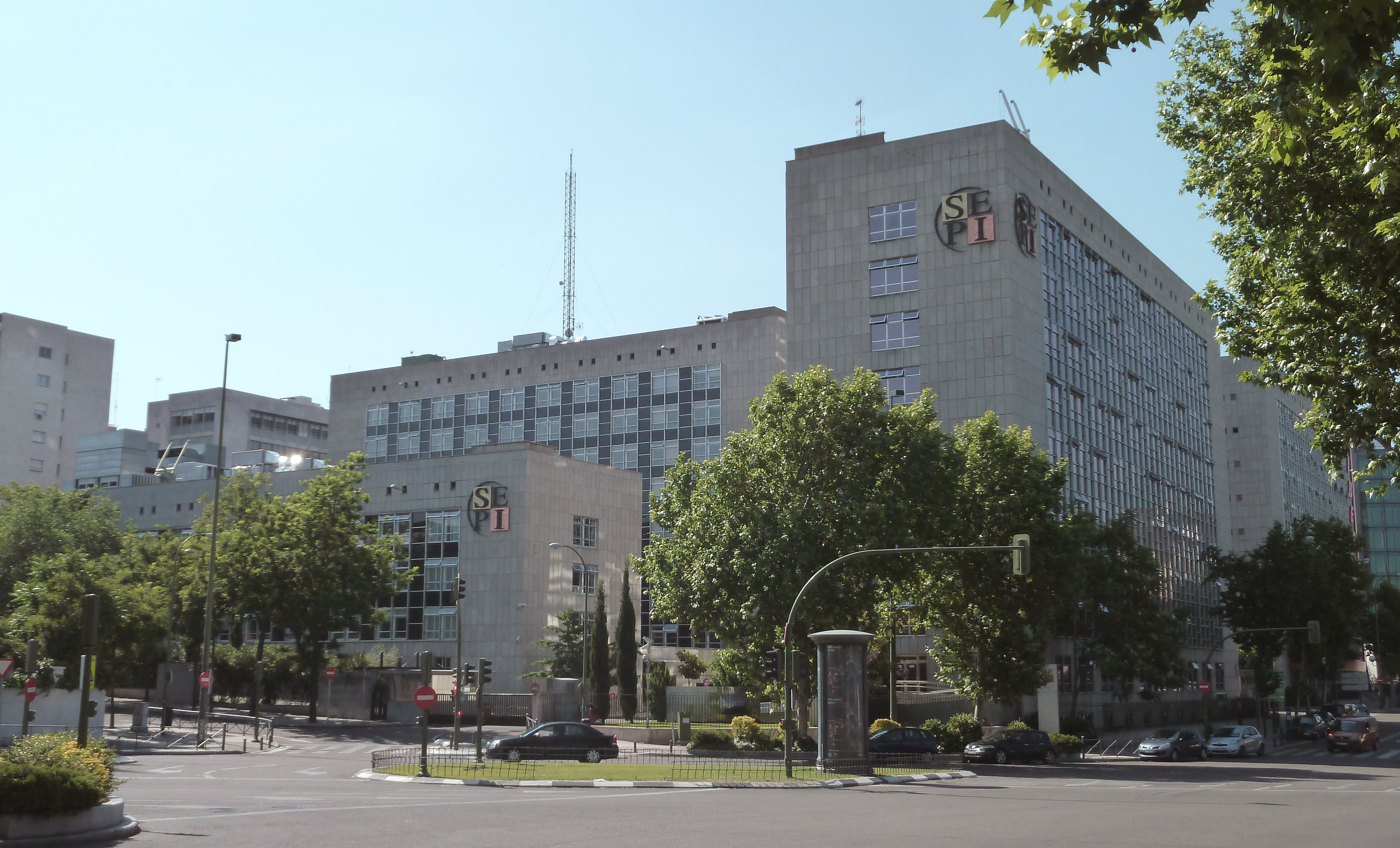
- Trade name: SEPI
- Type: State-owned public company National wealth fund
- Founded: 1995; 31 years ago
- Headquarters: Madrid, Spain
- Key people: Belén Gualda González (president)
- Revenue: ▲€6.36 billion (2024)
- Net income: ▼ (€501) million (2024)
- Total assets: ▲€19.87 billion (2024)
- Total equity: ▲4.18 billion (2024)
- Owner: Government of Spain
- Number of employees: ▲87,169 (2024)
- Subsidiaries: See SEPI Group
- Website: sepi.es

The State Company for Industrial Investments (Spanish: Sociedad Estatal de Participaciones Industriales; SEPI) is a Spanish state-owned holding company that is characterized as a sovereign wealth fund. It is part of the Ministry of Finance and is known for owning RTVE, the main Spanish radio and television broadcasting channel.

SEPI was preceded by the Instituto Nacional de Industria (INI) and the Instituto Nacional de Hidrocarburos (INH). On 16 June 1995, SEPI was created in a provisional restructure which was authorized by Decree number 5/1995. On 10 January 1996, SEPI was ratified by Act of Parliament number 5/1999. This provided for the creation of various public legal entities and the abolition of the INI and the INH.

== SEPI Group ==
SEPI has a direct and majority participation in nineteen companies, which make up the Grupo SEPI (SEPI Group). Its employees number around 80,000 workers. It also has interest in the Corporación Radiotelevisión Española (RTVE). SEPI also has minority direct shareholdings in seven companies, and indirect shareholdings in more than 100 companies.

The SEPI Group has four divisions. These are the energy, defence, food and environment and communications industry investment divisions.

The energy division includes ENSA, a nuclear power operator; the ENUSA group, a nuclear fuel producer; the HUNOSA group, a coal mining entity; and the SEPIDES group for energy consulting. SEPI also has minority shareholdings in ENAGÁS, the Spanish national gas supplier; ENRESA, a nuclear residue processor (SEPI 20 percent and CIEMAT eighty percent); and the Red Eléctrica de España (REE) corporation, the national electricity supplier.

The defence division includes DEFEX for defence equipment exports and security consulting; and the Navantia Group for military and civil construction. SEPI holds minority shareholdings in EADS Aircraft NV and HISPASAT satellite communications.

The food and environment division includes Cetarsa tobacco; the Hipódromo de la Zarzuela royal horse racing; Mayasa consulting and project management; the Mercas group for wholesale markets; SAECA food sector investments; the TRAGSA Group for rural and agricultural development; and the Alimentos y Aceites, a producer of fine foods and olive oil. Alimentos y Aceites has shares in Ebro Foods which produces and sells rice and pasta sauces.

The communication industry division included the Agencia EFE, a news entity; the RTVE corporation, the state broadcaster; the Ente Publico RTVE; a public information service promoting citizen participation; and the Correos Group, the national postal service.

The SEPI Group has overview of the social trust fund, Fundacion SEPI which arranges internships, student loans, and grants for technical training and business development activities.

The SEPI group holds indirect shares in more than one hundred commercial enterprises and retains some minority shareholdings in the International Airlines Group (IAG, formerly Iberia/BA) and España, Expansión Exterior (a Spanish exports development company with consulting, finance and technical assistance activities within foreign markets).

In February 2022, SEPI received authorization to increase its stake in Indra Sistemas to up to 28%; it subsequently held a 25.2% stake.

In December 2023, SEPI announced plans to acquire a stake of up to 10% in Telefónica worth $2.2 billion. The operation was concluded in May 2024.

=== Current investments ===
The SEPI Group is currently made up of 15 companies in which it has a majority and direct participation and another dozen of them in which it has a minority participation. Likewise, it participates indirectly in another hundred companies.

==== As majority shareholder ====
Company	Sector	Investment
Agencia EFE	Communications	100 %
Cetarsa	Environment & Agriculture	79.18 %
Cofivacasa	Finance	100 %
Correos	Mailing	100 %
Ensa	Energy	78.75 %
ENUSA	Energy	60 %
Hipódromo de la Zarzuela	Entertainment & sports	95.78 %
Hunosa	Mining	100 %
Mayasa	Environment & Agriculture	100 %
Mercasa	Food distribution	51 %
Navantia	Shipbuilding, defence	100 %
Saeca	Environment & Agriculture	80 %
Sepides	Business promotion	100 %
RTVE	Communications	100 %
Tragsa	Environment & Agriculture	51 %

==== As minority shareholder ====
Company	Sector	Investment
Airbus	Aerospace, defence	4.12 %
Ebro Foods	Food industry	10.36 %
Enagás	Energy	5 %
ENRESA	Radioactive waste management	20 %
EPICOM	Digital security	40 %
Hispasat	Satellites, communications	10.32 %
Indra Sistemas	TIC, telecoms, defence	27.99 %
International Airlines Group	Aviation	2.52 %
Red Eléctrica de España	Energy	20 %
Talgo	Transport	7.8 %
Telefónica	Telecommunications	10 %

== SEPI privatisation activity ==
List of publicly owned assets disposed up to March 2015.

List of SEPI privatisations
Company	Type of operation	End date	Governing parties
Aceralia	IPO Direct competitive sale	28/07/1997	Conservative
AENA	IPO Direct competitive sale of 49% of shares	19/02/2015	Conservative
Aerolíneas Argentinas	Direct competitive sale	02/10/2001	Conservative
Aldeasa	Institutional takeover (SEPPA), Specific agreement	24/07/1997	Conservative
Almagrera	Direct competitive sale	11/10/1996	Conservative
Altadis (Tabacalera)	IPA Bought deal	03/03/1998	Conservative
Argentaria	IPO	19/12/1997	Conservative
Astander	Direct competitive sale	21/10/1999	Conservative
Auxini	Management buyout	01/02/1996	Conservative
Casa	Integration into European group	26/11/1999	Conservative
Clinisas	Direct competitive sale	30/09/2005	Progressive
Comee	Public auction	10/07/1998	Conservative
Conversión Aluminio	Direct competitive sale	16/02/2001	Conservative
Coosur	Direct competitive sale	24/05/2002	Conservative
Cope	Management buyout	10/04/2000	Conservative
E.N. Elcano	Direct competitive sale	11/07/1997	Conservative
Enagas	Direct sale	21/03/1997	Conservative
Enatcar	Direct competitive sale	29/07/1999	Conservative
ENCE	direct competitive tender for Institutional takeover	15/06/2001	Conservative
Endesa	OPV, OPV, OPA	02/07/1997	Conservative
Expasa	Public auction of real estate	05/11/2001	Conservative
Ferroperfil	Direct competitive sale	24/07/1997	Conservative
Gas Natural	Institutional takeover	27/09/1996	Conservative
Grupo BBE	Direct competitive sale	04/02/2000	Conservative
Grupo ENA	Direct competitive sale	28/05/2003	Conservative
Grupo UPO Potasas	Direct competitive sale	28/07/1998	Conservative
Hijos de J. Barreras	Direct competitive sale	28/07/1997	Conservative
Iberia	Alianza Industrial, institutional IPO	02/07/1997	Conservative
Icsa/Aya	Direct competitive sale	26/02/1999	Conservative
Indra Sistemas	Alianza industrial IPO	13/05/1998	Conservative
Inespal	Direct competitive sale	24/07/1997	Conservative
Infoleasing	Direct competitive sale	12/09/1997	Conservative
Inima	Direct competitive sale	03/04/1998	Conservative
Inisas	Direct competitive sale	30/09/2005	Progressive
Initec	Direct competitive sale	23/04/1999	Conservative
Iongraf	Direct sale	13/12/1996	Conservative
Ionmed Esterilización	Direct competitive sale	27/07/2007	Progressive
Izar	Share sales at Gijón Sestao, Sevilla	18/07/2006	Progressive
LM composites	Management buyout	14/05/1999	Conservative
Musini	Musini S.A. - direct competitive tender - Musini Vida - Direct competitive sale	27/06/2003	Conservative
Olcesa	Direct competitive sale	24/05/2002	Conservative
Productos Tubulares	Execution of prior accord	28/09/1998	Conservative
Química del estroncio	Direct competitive sale	23/07/2002	Conservative
Red Eléctrica	IPA, B Bought Deal	23/04/1999	Conservative
Repsol	IPA	30/01/1997	Conservative
Santa Bárbara	Direct competitive sale	12/04/2000	Conservative
Sefanitro	IPA	05/12/1996	Conservative
Sodical	Direct competitive sale	20/12/1996	Conservative
Surgiclinic	Direct competitive sale	17/01/1997	Conservative
Telefónica	IPA	10/01/1997	Conservative
Telefónica Internacional S.A. (TISA)	Direct competitive sale	05/09/1997	Conservative
Trasmediterránea	Adjudicated IPA	30/07/2002	Conservative
Turbo2000	Direct competitive sale	12/12/2003	Conservative
Weser Engineering	Direct competitive sale	28/04/2006	Progressive
