= Wayra =

Latin American business incubator

- Founded: 2011; 15 years ago in Colombia
- Founder: José María Álvarez-Pallete
- Website: wayra.com

Wayra is a technological innovation hub, which was started in Latin America and Spain in 2011 as an initiative of Telefónica's chief executive in Europe, José María Álvarez-Pallete. Wayra operates through 11 hubs in 10 countries within Telefónica’s footprint: Argentina, Brazil, Chile, Colombia, Germany, Mexico, Peru, Spain, the United Kingdom and Venezuela.

== History ==
Wayra started in Colombia in mid 2011 and expanded to ten more countries that year.

In 2013, there were 14 Wayra academies in 12 countries in Europe and Latin America.

In March 2015, Telefónica closed down the Wayra in Prague, as a part of Telefónica's general exit from that market.

In 2015, Volo, which had been started at the Munich Wayra, was sold to the Rocket Internet.

Its UK branch is based in London and was managed by Gary Stewart until 2019. A new country manager, Bruno Vidal Sa De Moraes, took over in February 2020.

Wayra UK has partnered up with a healthcare company Novartis to support Health Tech start-ups, the National Cyber Security Centre, University of Edinburgh to create an accelerator for AI and blockchain start-ups. Based at the Bayes Centre, this programme is a collaboration between Wayra UK and The University of Edinburgh’s Data-Driven Innovation Initiative. Since its launch the programme has welcomed two cohorts featuring 20 data-driven start-ups. Between them they have raised over £3m in investment with a combined valuation of over £12m. The UK branch has also created an Intelligent Mobility accelerator which has chosen to support Spark, an AI start-up.
