= Red Eléctrica de España =

Spanish electricity transmission system operator

Red Eléctrica de España, S.A.U.
- Above, the logo of Redeia, the institutional name Below, the logo of Red Eléctrica, the trade name
- Type: Public
- Traded as: BMAD: REE
- ISIN: ES0173093115
- Industry: Utilities
- Founded: 1985; 41 years ago
- Headquarters: Alcobendas, Spain,
- Area served: Spain, Peru, Chile, Brazil
- Key people: Beatriz Corredor (chairwoman); Roberto García (CEO)
- Services: Transmission system operator
- Revenue: ▲€2.13 billion (2023)
- Operating income: ▲€910.1 million (2023)
- Net income: ▲€689.6 million (2023)
- Total assets: ▼€14.48 billion (2023)
- Total equity: ▲€5.5 billion (2023)
- Owner: SEPI (20%)
- Number of employees: ▲2,477 (2023)
- Parent: Redeia Corporación, S.A.
- Website: www.ree.es

Red Eléctrica de España (Spanish pronunciation: [reð eˈleɣtɾika ðe esˈpaɲa]; REE) is a partly state-owned and public limited Spanish corporation which operates the national electricity grid in Spain, where it operates the national power transmission system. It also holds assets in Peru, Chile and Brazil.

== History ==
The company was created in 1985 by the State-owned holding company Instituto Nacional de Industria (INI) to provide a unified national power grid. Up to 20% of Red Eléctrica is controlled by the state-owned holding company Sociedad Estatal de Participaciones Industriales (SEPI), with the remainder being free float on the Bolsa de Madrid.

== Sell-offs ==
The firm was also formerly active in telecommunications, but in 2005 sold its unit Albura (and with it access to a 7,500 km (4,700 mi) network of optical fibre) to Deutsche Telekom's unit T-Online for €61.5 million.

== Acquisitions ==
The company owns 5% of Portuguese counterpart Redes Energéticas Nacionais, with which it holds a strategic alliance.

TDE was said to have been acquired for 92 million euros for over 99% of the company from Union Fenosa in 2002. TDE contributed approximately some 1.5% of Red Electrica's total revenues and EBITDA. On 13 November 2014, Bolivia's government agreed to pay $36.5 million to Red Electrica in compensation for the nationalisation of TDE.

The company owns 100% of Peruvian utility company REDESUR (Red Eléctrica del SUR) in south of Perú. REE reached 100% in this firm in 2017, after acquiring the final 45%. Redesur operates the electricity system of southern Peru, and controls 100% of Transmisora Eléctrica del Sur (Tesur) and 75% of Transmisora Eléctrica del Sur 2 (Tesur2).

=== Nationalisation of Bolivian assets ===
REE owned-grid covers 74% of Bolivian electrical use, and the Bolivian government is making attempts to nationalize REE's subordinate company, Transportadora de Electricidad (TDE). Chairman José Folgado arrived in La Paz with Juan José Sosa, the Minister of Hydrocarbons and Energy, to negotiate the compensation from which the nationalization of TDE. Since the company had been bought, a large 74+ million dollar investment had been made in the maintenance, and additional projects that this company has broken through. In collaboration with Empresa Nacional de Electricidad (ENDE), they ensure that advances in the quality of the electrical grid have been made and there are no current problems.

They display a strong concern for their impact on the environment, as they are extremely cautious about keeping in line with strict environmental standards. Concepts they have adapted are both respect for the natural environment, and conservation of biodiversity.

The Bolivian Government has invested a lot of time and money into the nationalization of this expansive Spanish company, and is working towards improvements on the subsidiary, as long with compensation as well. Efforts are still being made to nationalize this company, along with all other subsidiary companies affiliated with REE.

On 1 May 2012, the Bolivian government announced its plans to nationalise REE's subsidiary in the country, Transportadora de Electricidad (TDE). The electric grid covers 74% of Bolivia's total grid, or 2,772 kilometres (1,722 mi) of transmission lines; the rest is controlled by smaller companies in the eastern lowlands which are not attached to the national grid. President Evo Morales said though REE would be compensated, it had invested US$81 million since the grid's privatisation in 1997 and the government had "invested $220m in generation and others profited. For that reason, brothers and sisters, we have decided to nationalise electricity transmission. Just to make it clear to national and international public opinion, we are nationalising a company that previously was ours." The Spanish Ambassador Ramon Santos said that the move was "sending a negative message that generates distrust." Following the measure, soldiers took over the corporate headquarters in Cochabamba peacefully and raised Bolivian flags. It also follows the partial nationalisation of the electric grid in 2010, including hydroelectric plants. However, in the past the compensation with France's GDF Suez and the United Kingdom's Rurelec PLC has not yet been accomplished. Rurelec also took the case for compensation to the Permanent Court of Arbitration.

Reactions include one from the European Commission, which said that it was "concerned by the Bolivian government's decision. Actions like this one necessarily send a negative signal to international investors over the business and investment climate in Bolivia. We trust the Bolivian authorities will fully uphold their investment agreements with Spain and ensure prompt and adequate compensation for this expropriation."

Spanish Finance Minister Luis de Guindos added that "the Spanish government does not like these sorts of decisions as we believe it's fundamental to maintain legal security when investing in countries like Bolivia." REE shares also fell 3.6% in early trading, though they recovered slightly later in the trading session. Though parallels were made in the media with Argentina's nationalisation of YPF from Spain's Repsol, sources in the Bolivian government were reported to have told Repsol chairman Antonio Brufau that their investment on a new gas plant of about 100 million euros was safe.

An anonymous Spanish diplomat said that the reaction was much more muted than with Argentina as "the diplomatic channels are open here, and it's all a matter of discussing a fair price, while in Argentina they didn't even want to meet with us." The vice president of the Spanish business confederation CEOE, Arturo Fernandez, said that "Spain seems to be the film bad guy as other foreign investors aren't going through a similar situation in the region. [The Spanish government] needs to take serious measures, as these moves could be contagious and spread to other countries." de Guindos also said this was less damaging than YPF's re-nationalisation as the investment was less and that the moves in both countries "have medium-term implications in terms of these countries' economic development and for the security of investments, which are vital."

For its part, Bolivian Vice President Álvaro García Linera said, on a visit to the U.K., that "we're just fulfilling the promise we made when we were elected, to recover all these areas that were in the hands of the state before these privatisations. Foreign investment can come to different areas. All we're expecting is that they comply with the rules of the country."

== April 2025 outage ==
On 28 April 2025 it suffered a massive outage which affected the whole of the Iberian Peninsula. A cyberattack was ruled out.

== See also ==
- Comisión Nacional de Energía (Spain)
- Footage of power outage at a tennis interview
