= Telefónica =

Spanish multinational telecommunications company

Telefónica, S.A.
- Logo since 2021

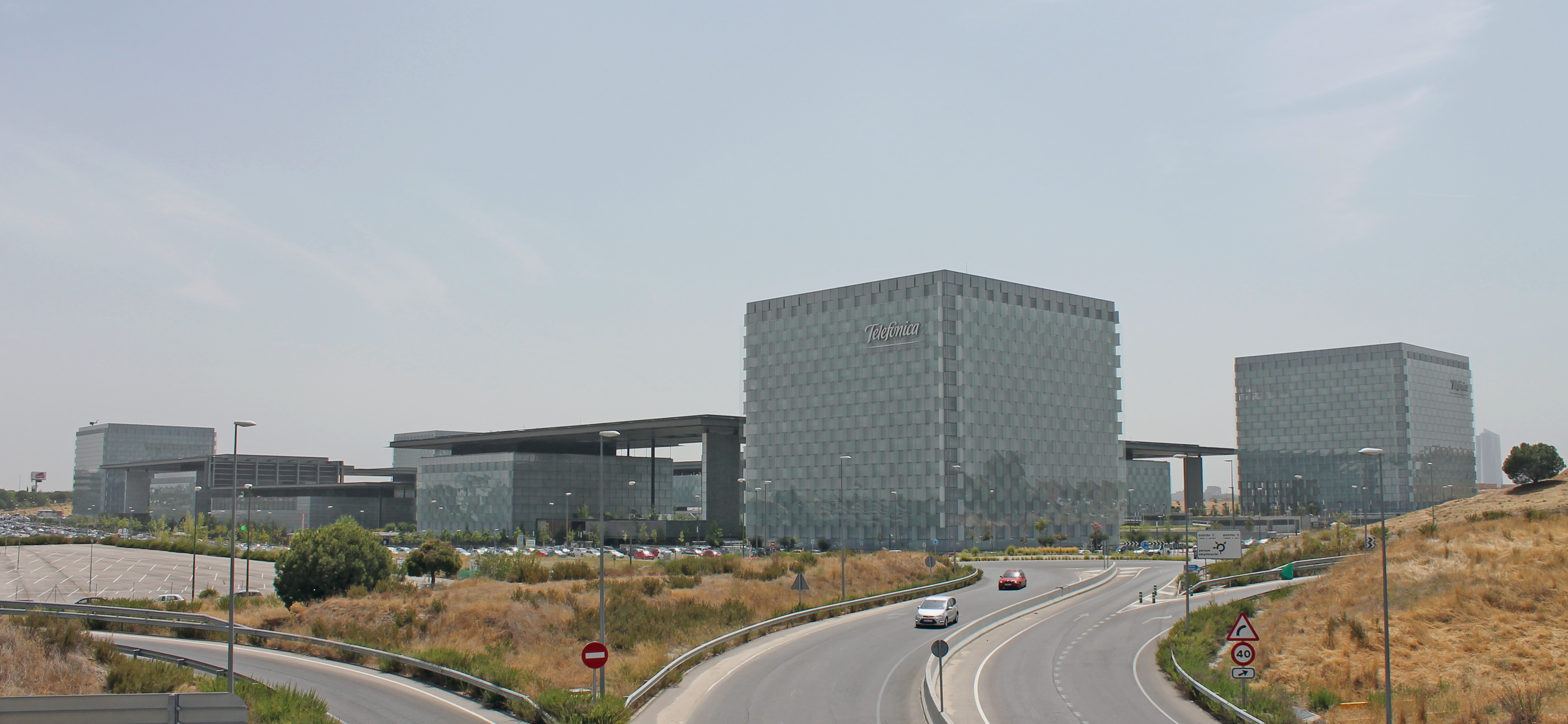
- Headquarters in Madrid, Spain
- Formerly: Compañía Telefónica Nacional de España (1924–1984)
- Type: Public
- Traded as: BMAD: TEF
- ISIN: ES0178430E18
- Industry: Telecommunications
- Founded: 19 April 1924; 102 years ago
- Defunct: 1988
- Headquarters: Distrito Telefónica, (HQ); Telefónica Building, (office), Madrid, Spain
- Areas served: Europe; Americas
- Key people: Marc Murtra (Chairman and CEO)
- Products: Fixedline telephony and mobile telephony; broadband internet; digital television
- Brands: Movistar; O2; Vivo
- Revenue: ▲$44.7 billion (2024)
- Operating income: ▼$2.6 billion (2024)
- Net income: ▲$-344.1 million (2024)
- Total assets: ▼$108.8 billion (2024)
- Total equity: ▼$24.6 billion (2024)
- Number of employees: 100,870 (2024)
- Subsidiaries: Virgin Media O2 (50%); Telefônica Brasil; Telefónica Germany; Telxius
- Website: telefonica.com

Telefónica, S.A. (Spanish pronunciation: [teleˈfonika]) is a Spanish multinational telecommunications company. It has headquarters as well as a registered office in Madrid, Spain. It is one of the largest telephone operators and mobile network providers in the world. It provides fixed and mobile telephony, broadband, and subscription television, operating in Europe and the Americas.

Along with its Telefónica brand, it also trades as Movistar, O2, and Vivo. The company is a component of the Euro Stoxx 50 stock market index. On 15 April 2012, Telefónica shut down TVA and Ajacto, which unified the brand into Vivo.

== History ==
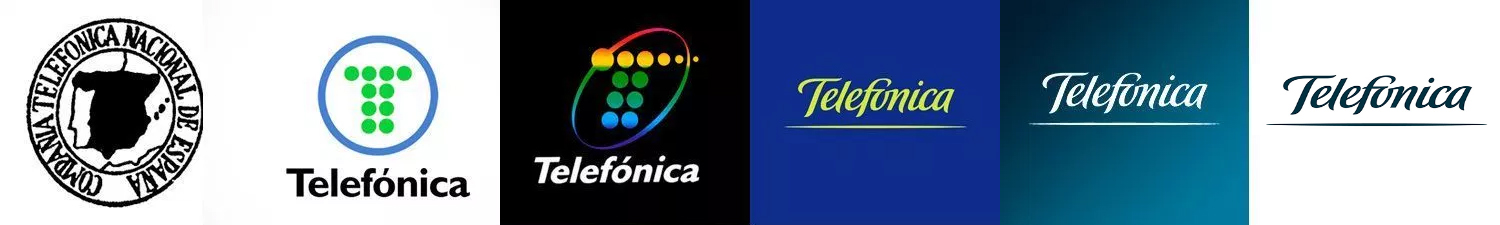
Telefónica's logo evolution since 1924 to 2021

The company was created in Madrid in 1924, as Compañía Telefónica Nacional de España (CTNE), with ITT among its major shareholders. In 1945, the state acquired by law a share of 79.6% of the company, later diluted by a capital increase in 1967.

Until the liberalization of the telecom market in 1997, Telefónica was the only telephone operator in Spain, where it retained a dominant position. Telefónica is present in 12 countries in Latin America and Europe, as of January 2024.

== Ownership ==
Telefónica is a publicly listed company with more than 1.5 million direct shareholders. At the end of 2025 its share capital comprised 5,670,161,554 ordinary shares (one euro each) traded on the Spanish Stock Market (Madrid, Barcelona, Bilbao, and Valencia) and on those in London, New York, Lima, and Buenos Aires.

Telefónica is a national defence service provider in Spain, where the government has a regulatory role in its M&A, including shareholders.

In September 2023, Saudi Arabia's telecom, STC Group, became Telefónica's largest shareholder, with a 9.9% holding, increasing its stake to €2.1 billion ($US2.23 billion), through shares and convertible financial instruments. Announced in December 2023, the Spanish government subsequently acquired a 10% stake in Telefónica, valued at $2.2 billion, in May 2024, to offset the telecom's Saudi ownership stake, through state holding company SEPI.

Stockholders of 5% or more ownership in the company, as at 13 August 2025, are:

- Government of Spain (SEPI): 10%
- CaixaBank: 9.99%
- China Unicom: 1.27%
- STC Group: 9.9%
- Banco Bilbao Vizcaya Argentaria (BBVA): 5.7%

== Operations ==
Map of countries where Telefónica brands operate as of 2026 Movistar O2 Vivo Former Movistar and O2 markets, brands are still used under license Former Movistar and O2 markets

=== Europe ===
==== Spain ====
Telefónica is the second largest corporation in Spain, behind the Santander Group. It operates under the Movistar and O2 brands with the first being the largest broadband and phone (both mobile and landlines) provider in Spain.

Telefónica's FTTH network in Spain is the most extensive fibre-to-home network in Europe, as of April 2016, and the shutdown plan for the legacy copper network is already in progress.

==== Germany ====
Telefónica is the parent of Telefónica Deutschland Holding AG, which held two alternative IP carriers. The two ISPs, mediaWays and HighwayOne merged in January 2003 after having been purchased by Telefónica in 2001 and February 2002 respectively.

On 26 January 2006, Telefónica completed its £17.7 billion (€25.7 billion) acquisition of the UK-based operator O2 which also provided mobile phone services in Germany under the O2 brand. Following the purchase, Telefónica merged Telefónica Deutschland and O2 Germany to form the current business Telefónica Germany.

Telefónica Germany, purchased competitor E-Plus on 1 October 2014. As part of the purchase, Telefónica reduced its stake in its subsidiary to 62.1%. Integration continues as of August 2015, but the now merged network is Germany's largest in customers.

==== United Kingdom ====
On 31 October 2005, O2 agreed to be taken over by Telefónica, with a cash offer of £17.7 billion, or £2 per share. According to the merger announcement, O2, which provided mobile phone services in the UK, Ireland, Germany and the Isle of Man (uniquely to the O2 group Manx Telecom also offered fixed-line services), retained its name and continued to be based in the United Kingdom, keeping both the brand and the management team. The merger became unconditional on 23 January 2006 and O2 became a wholly owned subsidiary of Telefónica. Manx Telecom was sold by Telefónica Europe in June 2010.

In January 2015, Li Ka-shing entered into talks with Telefónica to buy O2 for around £10.25 billion, aiming to merge it with his subsidiary Three. The acquisition was officially blocked by the European Commission on 11 May 2016, which argued that the merger would reduce consumer choice and lead to a higher cost of services Telefónica began to seek a stock market flotation of the business instead.

Announced on 7 May 2020, Liberty Global owner of Virgin Media and Telefónica owner of O2, agreed to merge their U.K. businesses in a deal worth £31bn and form one of the UK's largest entertainment and telecommunication companies to rival the BT Group. As of the 1 June 2021, Virgin Media and O2 UK Ltd officially merged to form Virgin Media O2, giving Telefónica a 50% stake in the new company, with the other 50% owned by Liberty Global.

==== Austria ====
In May 2022, Telefónica announced the acquisition of the European cloud-based services specialist and cloud Microsoft Dynamics partner BE-terna. The deal, worth €350 million, included 1,000 staff, AI, extended service capabilities across Europe, and a cybersecurity services division. The deal aimed to see Telefónica increase its geographic scale and aid its digital capabilities.

==== France ====
In France, since 2011, Telefónica has a joint venture with the French telecommunications company Bouygues Telecom, part of the Bouygues group, to offer global telecommunication services packages to multinational companies. This cooperation was expanded in June 2015 through the creation of a separate joint venture company named Telefónica Global Solutions France, with its own marketing and sales teams offering Telefónica and Bouygues Telecom services packages to corporations.

=== Americas ===
Telefónica operates the Movistar mobile phone brand throughout Latin America and the Vivo in Brazil. In Mexico it occupies a distant second place and it is the largest in Chile, Venezuela, and Brazil. Since 2019, Telefónica has divested the majority of its Latin American business in order to focus on the core markets Spain, Germany, UK and Brazil and add up to €2 billion in revenue with this programme.

==== Brazil ====
Telefónica's largest fixed-line operation in South America is in Brazil, where it provides broadband, local and long-distance telephone services in the aforementioned state, which alone represents the highest GDP of South America. It also owns a majority stake in the Brazilian mobile operator Vivo, having agreed on 28 July 2010 to buy Portugal Telecom's stake in the firm for €7.5 billion, after increasing its original offer by €1.8 billion over three months of incident-rich negotiations. The Telefónica group has been in the country since 1996 when it acquired CRT, a fixed-line and mobile operator in the southern part of the country. The landline division is currently part of Oi. In July 1998, acquired Telesp, the telephony operator of the Telebrás system in the state of São Paulo, forming Telefônica Brasil.

In June 2009, after four big "blackouts" on Telefónica's broadband "Speedy", ANATEL ordered Telefónica to stop sales of its broadband service until improvements were made on the infrastructure to provide better-quality service. After the release of sales of broadband internet in August 2009, ANATEL expects the company's service investments to keep on par with the sales. On 24 July 2010, Telefónica announced that the number of Speedy subscribers had exceeded three million people.

==== Dominican Republic ====
In 2000, Telefónica acquired a 26.5% stake in Tricom when it purchased part of the shares Motorola had obtained in 1993.

==== Venezuela ====
In late 2004, Telefónica took over the operations of Telcel Bellsouth in Venezuela, the first and largest mobile operator in the South American country at the time. After re-branding as Movistar, its CDMA2000 EvDO was progressively replaced by a GSM UMTS 3G network. Telefónica is currently rolling out 4G LTE in the country.

==== United States ====
Based in Miami, Florida, Telefónica USA, Inc. provides services to U.S.-based multinational companies that have operations in Latin America and Europe. Telefónica USA also operates the KeyCenter, a data center in Miami built to withstand category 5 hurricanes, from where the company supports Business Continuity and IT services for Enterprise customers in South Florida.

==== Puerto Rico ====
In Puerto Rico, Telefónica has presence through Telefónica Empresas, Telefónica Larga Distancia – TLD, Telefónica International Wholesale Services – TIWS (formerly Emergia) and Atento. Telefónica Moviles, through its Movistar brand, had presence in Puerto Rico until mid-2007 but it sold the Puerto Rico network to a private equity group who renamed it Open Mobile.

=== Asia ===
==== China ====
In 2009, China Unicom agreed to a $1 billion cross-holding with Telefónica. In January 2011, the two partners agreed to a further $500 million tie-up in each other. Following completion in late 2011, Telefónica will hold a 9.7% stake in China Unicom, and China Unicom will own 1.4% of the Spanish firm.

In 2018, China Unicom and Telefónica establish a new partnership to combine their services and networks in the internet of things, so as to enable its clients to deploy IoT products and services in China, Europe and Latin America with a single global IoT SIM card.

== Former operations ==
=== Czech Republic ===
In 2005, Telefónica bought Český Telecom (Czech Telecom), the former state-owned Czech phone operator which still dominates the Czech fixed-line market. As part of this deal Telefónica also gained its 100% subsidiary Eurotel, one of three mobile phone operators in the Czech Republic. Starting 1 July 2006, both companies were merged into one legal entity and renamed Telefónica O2 Czech Republic. In 2011, the company was renamed Telefónica Czech Republic and in 2013, it was announced that Telefónica would sell its stake in the company to PPF. Under the terms of the sale, the company was allowed to continue to trade under the O2 brand for a maximum of four years. In August 2017, the brand license agreement was extended to 2022, with a 5-year extension to 2027 available.

=== Slovakia ===
During 2006, Telefónica won the tender to become the third mobile phone operator in Slovakia, under the O2 brand. It began providing services on 2 February 2007 under the name Telefónica O2 Slovakia, s.r.o. It initially launched providing only a prepaid service but in mid-2007 began to sell contract phones. The company was sold along with Telefónica Czech Republic to PPF.

=== Ireland ===
O2 in Ireland was purchased by Telefónica as part of its acquisition of O2 plc in the UK in 2005. Telefónica Ireland has become the second largest mobile phone operator in Ireland, operating a GSM/EDGE and high-speed HSPA+ wireless broadband network to residential and business customers through its "O2" brand. Telefónica Ireland also provide fixed broadband to business customers.

It was announced on 24 June 2013 that Telefónica had agreed to sell its O2 Ireland mobile business for at least €780 million ($1 billion) in cash to Hutchison Whampoa's subsidiary 3. O2 was merged into Hutchison Whampoa's subsidiary Three Ireland in March 2015.

=== Italy ===
Telefónica currently owns 46% of Telco, the holding company that controls 22% of Telecom Italia, Italy's former government–owned telephone company. In late 2003, Telefónica announced its intention to acquire the entirety of Telco by January 2014, potentially becoming Telecom Italia's largest shareholder. The plan, was however challenged by the Brazilian competition authority since Telefónica and Telecom Italia, with Vivo and TIM Brasil respectively, are the two largest telephone companies competing in Brazil. Subsequently, Telefónica confirmed in September 2014 that it intended to sell its shares in Telecom Italia following the purchase of Global Village Telecom (GVT) in Brazil from Vivendi. Telefónica sold its shares in the business to Vivendi as part of the sale of GVT in June 2015.

=== Central and South America ===
After acquiring 100% of Paysandú S.A., Telefónica started its operations in Guatemala 1998 as Telefónica Movistar and just Telefónica for landlines. In 2004, acquired 100% of BellSouth Guatemala, relaunching mobile operations as Movistar in 2005, with mobile services based on CDMA technology, in 2004 as Telefónica Movistar launch national service with GSM/GPRS technology, and CDMA 1x EV-DO for data. Telefónica Móviles Guatemala (renamed in 2005) offered services on UMTS/HSPA starting in June 2009, and it was the last operator to launch commercial services on this technology, with coverage in all major cities in Guatemala.

On 24 January 2019, América Móvil announced the that it would acquire both the Guatemalan and El Salvadoran operations of Telefónica for US$333 million and $315 million, respectively. The transaction would also acquire all Pay TV operations. The sale was eventually approved in Guatemala and would later become intergraded into Claro. However, the transaction for the El Salvadoran operations to be sold to América Móvil were scrapped due to regulatory hurdles.

Telefónica had purchased the Panamanian, Ecuadorian and Guatemalan operations of BellSouth in 2004 for US$1665 Million, followed by a rebranding to Movistar in 2005. The purchase was intended to help Telefónica focus on its largest markets, alleviating its debt. In February 2019, Millicom announced the purchase of the Panamanian, Costa Rican and Nicaraguan operations of Telefónica for US$1,650 Million, with plans to phase out the Movistar brand from those markets within a year after purchase. The transaction was completed in August the same year. The Costa Rican business, however, was not part of the final Telefónica-Millicom-deal. The Guatemalian and El Salvadorian business was sold to America Movil in 2019 for $315m.

==== Costa Rica ====
Telefónica signed a contract for 15 years (extendable for 10 additional years) on 12 May 2011 with the government of Costa Rica. It started operations in 2011 under its Movistar branding. Telefónica sold its Costa Rican business to Liberty Latin America for €425m in 2020.

==== Colombia ====
In March 2025, Telefónica sold its majority stake in Colombian telecom Coltel to Millicom.

==== Uruguay ====
In May 2025, Millicom also acquired Telefónica's mobile business in Uruguay for $440 million.

==== Argentina ====
Telefónica owned Telefónica de Argentina, the largest fixed-line operator in Argentina during 1990-2025, providing broadband, local and long-distance telephone services in the southern part of the country, as well as the Greater Buenos Aires area. The mobile business was then operated by Telefónica Móviles through Movistar, a local subsidiary. In January 2025 Telefónica had hired investment bank JPMorgan to evaluate a possible sale of its Argentina holdings. The operation was sold to Telecom Argentina for $US1.5 billion in 2025.

==== Peru ====
Subsidiary Telefónica del Peru was the largest telecom provider in Peru from 1994, providing local, long-distance, and broadband services nationwide. Its mobile telephone business operated under the Movistar brand, from January 2011 on, and competed with major provider Claro. Its main offices were located in Santa Beatriz. The company filed for bankruptcy protection for its Peruvian business, then agreed to sell the unit, in February 2025, to domestic telecom Integra Tec International, for €900k (US$1.02 million).

==== Ecuador ====
After acquiring 100% of OTECEL S.A. (Bellsouth), Telefónica Móviles Ecuador started its operations on 14 October 2004 as Movistar. It is one of only three mobile operators in Ecuador. Telefónica in Ecuador has started offering 3G service from the second half of 2009. Telefónica sold its Ecuador business to Millicom for $380m in 2025.

==== Panama ====
Telefónica started its operations in Panama in 2004 as Telefónica acquired 100% of Bellsouth Panama. Since then, it has operated using the name Movistar for mobile services. It migrated from CDMA technology used by Bellsouth to GSM 850. It also offers 3G using UMTS 850 and UMTS 1900. In 2015, it launched LTE with coverage expanding in Panama City, Arraijan, Chorrera up to Buenaventura Beach. Telefónica sold its Panama business to Millicom for €536 in 2025.

==== Colombia ====
On 18 April 2006, Telefónica's president Cesar Alierta signed an agreement with the Colombian government to buy 50% and one share of the state-owned communications company, Colombia Telecomunicaciones (TELECOM). With this sale, Telefónica became the largest Colombian land-line operator, and also gained an important presence in the local, long-distance and broadband market. The mobile business was run by Telefónica Móviles through the brand Movistar. Telefónica announced the sale of its Colombia business to Millicom for $214m in early 2026.

==== Chile ====
Telefónica owns Telefónica Chile, formerly CTC (Compañía de Telecomunicaciones de Chile, formerly known as Compañía de Teléfonos de Chile) which is the biggest fixed-line operator and internet service provider in the country. The Telefónica Group has been in the country since 1989. The mobile business is run by Telefónica Móviles through a local subsidiary. On 26 October 2009, Telefónica Chile changed its name to Movistar, including cellphone, landline, satellite TV, and internet. Telefónica announced the sale of its Chilean business to Millicom and NJJ Holdings for up to €1.156 billion in early 2026.

== Sponsorship ==
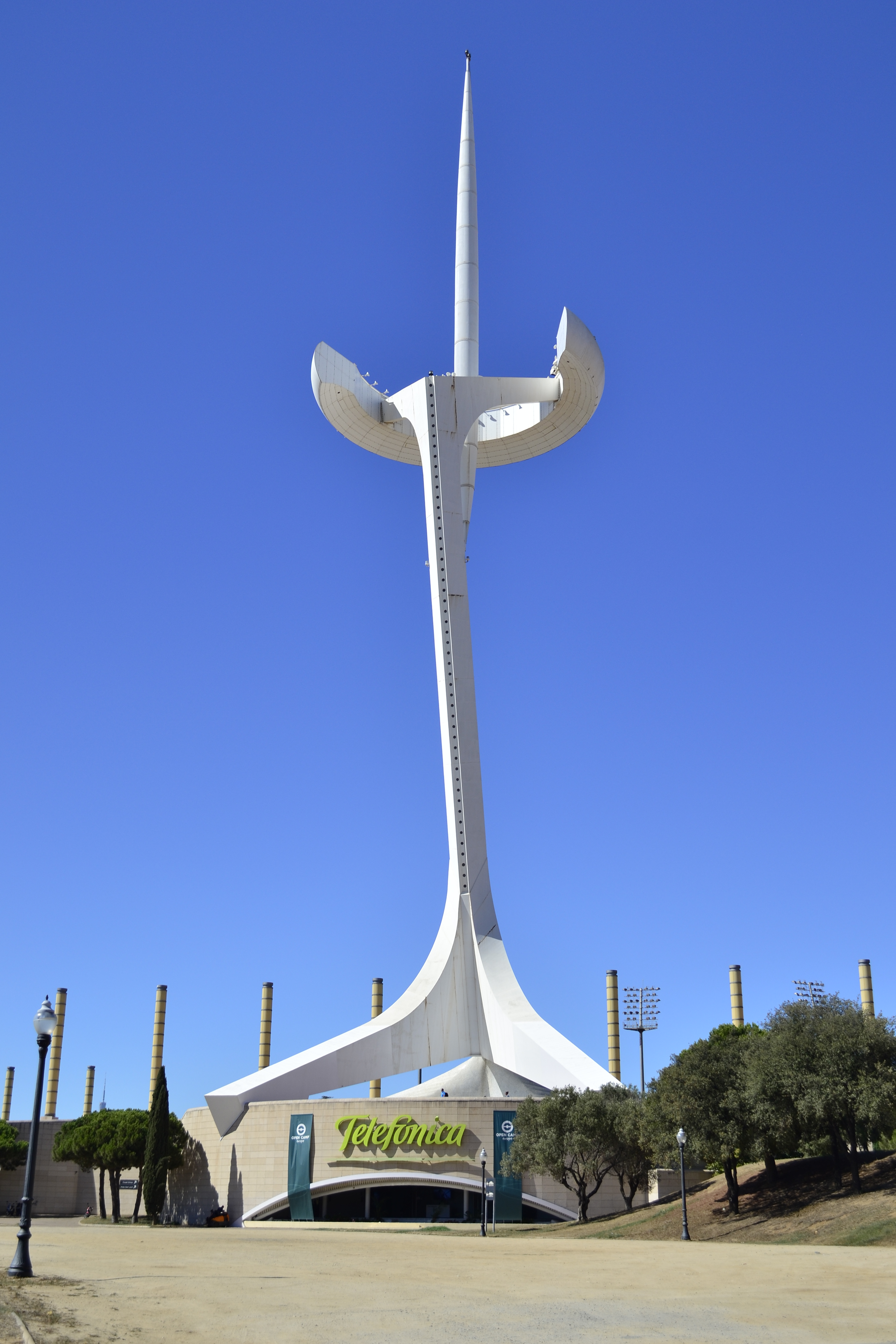
Telefónica Tower in Barcelona

=== Cycling ===
Since 2011, it is a sponsor of the Spanish UCI ProTour cycling team known as Movistar Team.

=== Football ===
In football, Teléfonica is an official sponsor for several national teams such as Spain (Movistar+) in Europe, and Brazil (vivo), Mexico, Colombia, Peru, or Venezuela in the Americas.

=== Rugby ===
O2 are the main sponsors of the England national rugby team.

=== Motor sports ===
Teléfonica, through Movistar, was the title sponsor of Yamaha Motor Racing from 2014 to 2018, a motorcycle racing team in MotoGP. It was also the title sponsor of Suzuki's factory team from 2000 to 2002 Sito Pons' Honda team from 1997 to 1999 and Fausto Gresini's Honda team from 2003 to 2005.

Within Formula One, Telefónica sponsored the Minardi F1 Team in 1999 and 2000, including title sponsorship in 2000, as well a major sponsor of the Renault F1 Team from 2004 to 2006 until Fernando Alonso's departure to McLaren in 2007, and were title sponsors of the Spanish Grand Prix from 2006 to 2010. Through its acquisition of O_{2}, Telefónica also indirectly sponsored the BMW Sauber F1 Team.

In the World Rally Championship, Telefónica sponsored the SEAT Sport WRC Team between 1998 and 2000, under both Movistar and Telefónica Movistar. Telefónica sponsored the Ford WRC Team in seasons 2000–2002 when Spanish rally driver Carlos Sainz drove for the team, and when Sainz moved to the Citroën WRC Team for 2003, Telefónica followed. The sponsorship was not continued into 2004, despite Sainz staying with the team.

In the 2000 CART season, PPI Motorsports raced the #96 Telefónica Toyota-Reynard, driven by Spanish rookie Oriol Servià. Oriol finished 15th in the standings with a best result of 3rd, and failed to win Rookie of the Year. Teammate da Matta in the #97 Pioneer Toyota-Reynard performed better with 10th and 1 win, however the team retired from open-wheel racing at the end of the season, and the sponsorship ended.

=== Sailing ===
Movistar- and Telefónica-sponsored teams contested the round-the-world Volvo Ocean Race in the 2005–06, 2008–09, and 2011–12 events.

=== eSports ===
Telefónica sponsors, through its Movistar brand, the "Movistar KOI" eSports team.

== Investments and collaborations ==
Telefónica is a supporter of the Hybrid Broadcast Broadband TV (HbbTV) initiative that is promoting and establishing an open European standard for hybrid set-top boxes for the reception of broadcast TV and broadband multimedia applications with a single user interface, and has run pilot HbbTV services in Spain.

Telefónica's Wayra subsidiary first launched in Latin America and Spain in 2011 to provide seed investment and mentoring to new companies. Since its inception, Wayra has backed over 300 companies including Trustev, Venddo, Cloudwear and NFWare.

As of 1 December 2014, the Firefox web browser includes the Firefox Hello WebRTC feature, that allows real-time voice and video online chats. Firefox Hello is powered by Telefónica and was also co-developed by Telefónica.

In September 2017, Nokia and Telefónica signed an agreement in order to evaluate technologies enabling an efficient network evolution to 5G in line with Telefónica's business objectives.

In 2021, Telefónica Global Solutions entered into an agreement with IDT Carrier Services (now IDT Global) to enable direct international SMS transmission between the two networks. The partnership was reported by telecom industry media and aimed at improving the efficiency of global messaging interconnection.

== Chairpersons ==
Year	Chairperson
1924-1945	Estanislao de Urquijo y Ussía
1945-1964	José Navarro-Reverter Gomis
1964-1973	Antonio Barrera de Irimo
1973-1976	José Antonio González-Bueno
1976-1980	Tomás Allende y García-Baxter
1980-1982	Salvador Sánchez-Terán
1982-1989	Luis Solana
1989-1996	Cándido Velázquez-Gaztelu
1996-2000	Juan Villalonga
2000-2016	César Alierta
2016-2025	José María Álvarez-Pallete
2025-act.	Marc Murtra

== Monopoly ==
Telefónica has received several fines due to convictions over unfair competition, abuse of its position as dominant provider, and antitrust violations through the Commission of Telecommunications, European Commission, and Spanish tribunals. These fines include:

- 900,000 euro fine, Spanish tribunals
- 18 million euro fine, Spanish Telecommunication Market commission, 57 million in 2004 for unfair competition
- 151.9 million euro by European Commission for abusing its dominant position

As of 2008, Telefónica had in court two more fines, with a value of 793 million euros.

On 5 July 2007, the European Commission ordered Telefónica to pay a record antitrust fine of almost €152 million for activities in the Spanish broadband market which, according to European Union competition commissioner Neelie Kroes, "harmed Spanish consumers, Spanish businesses and the Spanish economy as a whole, and by extension Europe's economy."

Several consumer groups in Spain have reported unnecessary delays in cancelling Telefónica's ADSL service. These consumer groups also claim that services continue to be billed after being cancelled and that service cancellation requests are ignored. This has led Spanish people to organize themselves in consumer groups such as the "Asociación de Internautas" and user communities like "Bandaancha" in order to defend themselves from Telefónica's abuses and to give support and help to each other in their various complaints about Telefónica's unfair practices.

The practices are claimed to include the complex process involved in cancelling lines. These line cancellation procedures are justified by Telefónica as a way of "defending customers against hoaxes." Furthermore, in areas where ADSL lines are scarce, there are also reports of customers who claim to have had their service cancelled or inexplicably transferred to another customer although they have paid their bills. This practice is considered by some to be used by Telefónica in certain areas of Spain where there are few broadband connections.

== Positions on network neutrality ==
In February 2010, Telefónica CEO Cesar Alierta expressed in a meeting at Bilbao, Spain that his company intends to charge Google and other search engines for the use of its network. Alierta complained that such search engines were benefiting from the platform without contributing to the company's expenses and that such a trend will change in the near future. Additionally, he said that Telefónica will seek to push its own content.

== Innovation ==
In 2017, Telefónica announced the launch of OnLife Networks, intended to infuse innovation into the company.

== See also ==
- List of mobile network operators
- List of telecommunications companies
- List of telecommunications regulatory bodies
- Movistar
