= Madrid Stock Exchange General Index =

The Madrid Stock Exchange General Index (IGBM) is a capitalization-weighted stock market index that measures the performance of a selected number of continuous market stocks. It is the principal index for the Bolsa de Madrid (Madrid Stock Exchange) and represents the construction, financial services, communications, consumer, capital/intermediate goods, energy and market service sectors. The index is calculated by BME. The index was developed with a base value of 100 as of December 31, 1985.

== IBEX ==
The IBEX 35 is a market capitalization weighted index comprising the 35 most liquid Spanish stocks traded in the Madrid Stock Exchange General Index and is reviewed twice annually. There are further indices calculated by BME, like the IBEX TOP DIVIDENDO which represents the stocks with the highest dividend.

== New Market ==
- Abengoa
- Amper
- Avanzit
- Befesa
- Indra
- Jazztel
- Zeltia

== Rest of companies (Mercado Continuo and Latibex) ==
- Adolfo Domínguez
- ALFA
- América Móvil
- Aracruz Celulose
- Arcelor-Mittal
- Astroc Mediterráneo
- CAF
- Azkoyen
- Banco Bradesco
- Banco Cuscatlán
- Banco de Andalucía
- Banco de Castilla
- Banco de Chile
- Banco de Crédito Balear
- Banco de Galicia
- Barón de Ley
- Banco de Valencia
- Banco de Vasconia
- Bayer Hispania
- Banco Guipuzcoano
- Banco Pastor
- Banco Río de la Plata
- BBVA Banco Francés
- Bolsas y Mercados Españoles
- Bodegas Riojanas
- Bradespar
- Braskem
- CVNE
- Campofrío
- Cementos Portland Valderrivas
- CEMIG
- CEPSA
- CIE Automotive
- CLEOP
- COPEL
- Corporación Financiera Alba
- Corporación Dermoestética
- Distribución y Servicio D&S
- Duro Felguera
- Dinamia (formerly Dogi SA)
- Dogi International Fabrics
- EADS
- Ebro Puleva
- Electricidad de Caracas
- Elecnor
- Eletrobrás
- Enersis
- Ercros
- Española del Zinc
- EUROPAC
- Europistas
- Faes Farma
- Funespaña
- GAMA
- Gesiuris
- Casas GEO
- Gerdau
- Grupo Catalana Occidente
- Grupo Elektra
- Grupo Empresarial ENCE
- Grupo Inmocaral
- Grupo Modelo
- Grifols
- Hullas del Coto Cortés
- Iberpapel
- Inbesòs
- INDO
- Inmobiliaria Colonial
- Inmobiliaria Urbis
- Informes y Proyectos
- La Seda de Barcelona
- Lingotes Especiales
- Logista
- Mecalux
- Miquel y Costas
- Montebalito
- NATRA
- Net Serviços de Comunicação
- Nicolás Correa
- OHL
- Parquesol Inmobiliaria Y Proyectos
- Paternina
- Pescanova
- Petrobras
- Prim
- PRISA
- Prosegur
- Reno De Medici
- Renta Corporación
- Riofisa
- Santander Puerto Rico
- Sare Privanza
- Service Point Solutions
- SNIACE
- Sol Meliá
- SOS Cuétara
- Sotogrande
- Suzano Bahia Sul Papel e Celulose
- Suzano Petroquímica
- Tableros de Fibras
- TAVEX
- Técnicas Reunidas
- Telepizza
- Telmex
- Testa
- TUBACEX
- Tubos Reunidos
- Tudor
- TV Azteca
- Unipapel
- Uralita
- URBAS
- Usiminas
- Vale do Rio Doce
- Vidrala
- Viscofan
- Vocento
- VOLCAN Compañía Minera
- Vueling Airlines

== See also ==
- Exchange-traded fund
- Index (Economics)
- Index fund
- Index investing
- Passive management
- Category:IBEX 35
