= IBEX Small Cap =

- Foundation: July 1, 2005; 21 years ago
- Operator: Bolsas y Mercados Españoles (BME)
- Constituents: 30
- Type: Small-cap
- Weighting method: Capitalization-weighted
- Related indices: IBEX 35, IBEXC, IGBM
- ISIN: ES0SI0000021

The IBEX Small Cap (IBEXS) is a stock market index created by Bolsas y Mercados Españoles (BME) that tracks the performance of small-cap companies listed on the four Spanish stock exchanges that trade through the Sistema de Interconexión Bursátil Español (SIBE). It is a capitalization-weighted index. It consists of the 30 largest companies following those in the IBEX Medium Cap. Its ISIN is ES0SI0000021.

== History ==
On March 1, 2005, Bolsas y Mercados Españoles announced the creation of the IBEX Medium Cap (mid-cap stocks) and IBEX Small Cap (small-cap stocks) indices. Both were officially launched on July 1, 2005.

== Component selection ==
The inclusion or exclusion of stocks in the index's composition is reviewed semiannually based on specific criteria by a group of experts known as the Technical Advisory Committee (Comité Asesor Técnico, CAT), which is responsible for deciding which companies are added or removed. Their regular meetings are held in June and December, and their decisions become effective on the first business day of July and January, respectively. However, extraordinary meetings may be held if circumstances require it. There is no minimum or maximum number of changes that can be made; there may be none or as many as deemed appropriate.

Criteria:

- Companies must not be part of the IBEX 35 or the IBEX Medium Cap.
- They must have a free float percentage greater than 15% and an annualized turnover on the actual free float greater than 15%. Free float is defined as the number of shares actually in circulation in the market.

Based on these metrics, a ranking is established; the top 20 eligible stocks are assigned to the IBEX Medium Cap, and the subsequent 30 to the IBEX Small Cap.

== Composition ==
The following table lists the 30 components of the IBEX Small Cap as of September 2026:

Ticker	Company	Headquarters	Sector
AI	Airtificial	Madrid, Madrid	Engineering and others
ALNT	Alantra	Madrid, Madrid	Financial services
EAT	AmRest	Madrid, Madrid	Consumer services
ATRY	Atrys Health	Madrid, Madrid	Health care
ADX	Audax	Badalona, Catalonia	Renewable energy
AZK	Azkoyen	Peralta, Navarre	Engineering and others
BKY	Berkeley Energía	Madrid, Madrid	Minerals, metals and transformation
CBAV	Clínica Baviera	Madrid, Madrid	Health care
OLE	Deoleo	Rivas-Vaciamadrid, Madrid	Food and beverage
MDF	Duro Felguera	Gijón, Asturias	Engineering and others
ENER	Ecoener	A Coruña, Galicia	Renewable energy
EDR	eDreams ODIGEO	Madrid, Madrid	Consumer services
ENC	Ence Energía y Celulosa	Madrid, Madrid	Paper and forestry
EZE	Ezentis	Madrid, Madrid	Technology and telecommunications
GEST	Gestamp Automoción	Madrid, Madrid	Automotive components
DOM	Global Dominion Access	Bilbao, Basque Country	Engineering and others
GSJ	Grupo San José	Pontevedra, Galicia	Construction
IZER	Izertis	Gijón, Asturias	Technology consulting
RJF	Laboratorio Reig Jofre	Sant Joan Despí, Catalonia	Pharmaceuticals
LGT	Lingotes Especiales	Valladolid, Castile and León	Automotive components
NTH	Naturhouse Health	Madrid, Madrid	Food and beverage
NXT	Nextil	Madrid, Madrid	Textile, clothing and footwear
NEA	Nicolás Correa, S.A.	Burgos, Castile and León	Manufacturing and assembly of capital goods
OHLA	Obrascón Huarte Lain	Madrid, Madrid	Construction
ORY	Oryzon Genomics	Madrid, Madrid	Pharmaceuticals and biotechnology
PRM	Prim, S.A.	Móstoles, Madrid	Health care
PSG	Prosegur	Madrid, Madrid	Services
CASH	Prosegur Cash	Madrid, Madrid	Services
TLGO	Talgo	Las Rozas, Madrid	Manufacturing and assembly of capital goods
TUB	Tubacex	Llodio, Basque Country	Manufacturing and assembly of capital goods
