= IBEX 35 =

Spanish stock market index

- Foundation: January 14, 1992
- Operator: Bolsas y Mercados Españoles
- Exchanges: Bolsa de Madrid
- Trading symbol: ^IBEX
- Constituents: 35
- Type: Large cap
- Market cap: €451,626 billion (March 2021)
- Weighting method: Capitalization-weighted
- Related indices: Madrid Stock Exchange General Index
- Website: Official website

The IBEX 35 (IBerian IndEX) is the benchmark stock market index of the Bolsa de Madrid, Spain's principal stock exchange. Initiated in 1992, the index is administered and calculated by Sociedad de Bolsas, a subsidiary of Bolsas y Mercados Españoles (BME), the company which runs Spain's securities markets (including the Bolsa de Madrid). It is a market capitalization-weighted index comprising the 35 most liquid Spanish stocks traded in the Madrid Stock Exchange General Index and is reviewed twice annually. Trading on options and futures contracts on the IBEX 35 is provided by MEFF (Mercado Español de Futuros Financieros), another subsidiary of BME.

== History ==
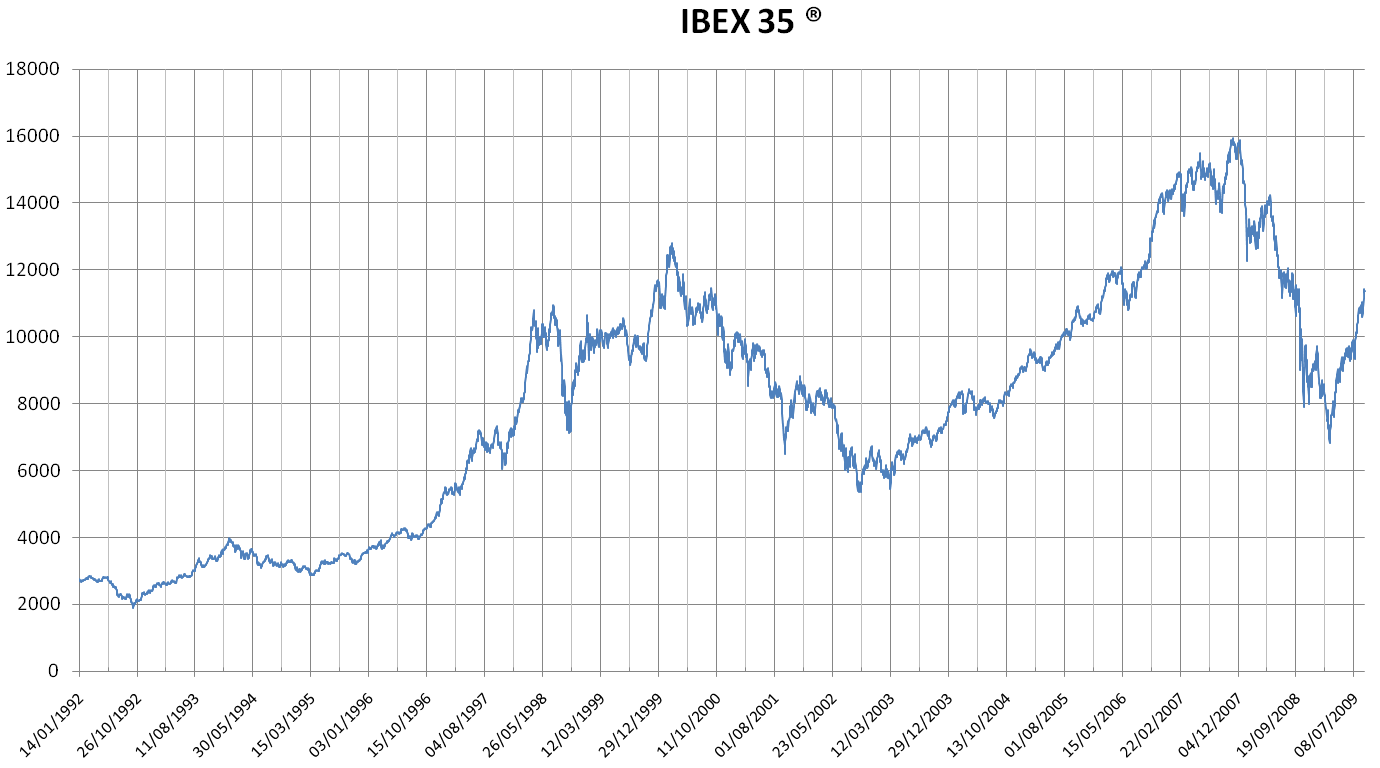
Performance of the IBEX 35 between 1992 and 2009

The IBEX 35 was inaugurated on January 14, 1992, although there are calculated values for the index back to December 29, 1989, where the base value of 3,000 points lies.

Between 2000 and 2007, the index outperformed many of its Western peers, driven by relatively strong domestic economic growth which particularly helped construction and real estate stocks. Consequently, while the record highs to date of the FTSE 100, CAC 40 and AEX, for example, were set during the dot-com bubble in 1999 and 2000, the IBEX 35's all-time maximum of 15,945.70 was reached on November 8, 2007.

The 2008 financial crisis included extreme volatility in the markets, and saw both the biggest one day percentage fall and rise in the IBEX 35's history. The index closed 7.5% down on January 21, 2008, the second biggest fall in the Spanish equity market since 1987, and rose a record 6.95% three days later.

== Rules ==
=== Selection ===
The composition of the IBEX 35 is reviewed twice per year (in June and December) by the so-called Technical Advisory Committee, which consists of "representatives of the stock exchanges and derivatives markets, as well as... renowned experts from the academic and financial fields". If any changes are made, they come into effect the following trading day after the third Friday of the rebalance month In general, at each review, the 35 companies with the highest trading volume in Euros over the previous six months are chosen for inclusion in the index, provided that the average free float market capitalization of the stock is at least 0.3% of the total market cap of the index. Any candidate stock must also have either been traded on at least a third of all trading days in the previous six months, or rank in the top twenty overall in market cap (thus allowing large recently IPOed companies to be included).

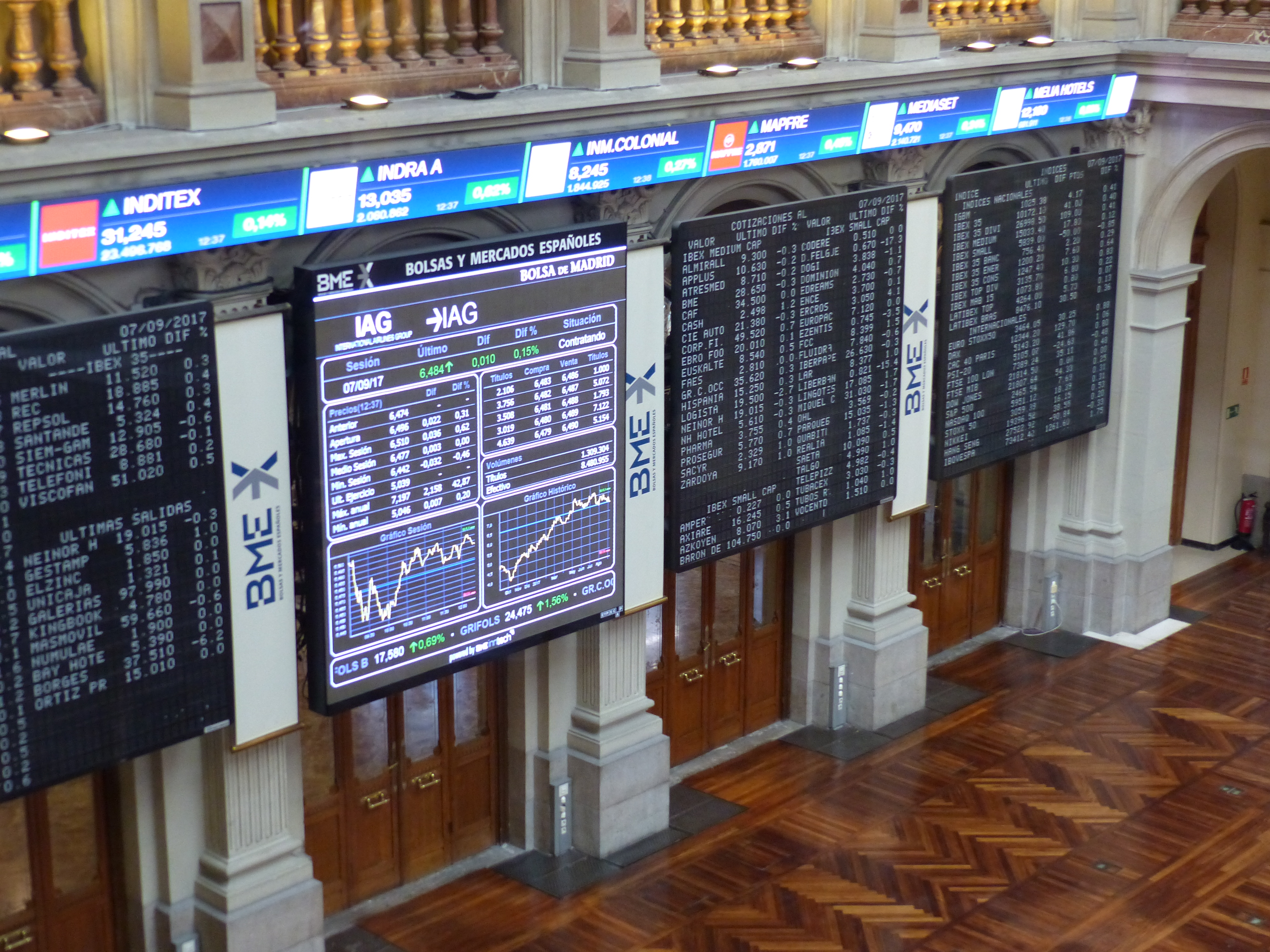
The Bolsa de Madrid

=== Weighting ===
The IBEX 35 is a capitalization-weighted index. The market cap used to calculate the weighting of each constituent is multiplied by a free float factor (ranging from 0.1 to 1) depending on the fraction of shares not subject to block ownership. Any company with 50% or more of its shares considered free float is given a free float factor of 1. Unlike many other European benchmark indices, the weightings of companies in the IBEX 35 are not capped.

As of 2015, international funds based abroad (chiefly in Norway, the United States, the United Kingdom and Qatar) owned 43% of the index, vs. 16% in 1992. Such rate of foreign investment was about 5% above the EU average.

=== Calculation ===
The index value (given here as I) of the IBEX 35 index is calculated using the following formula:

$I(t) = I(t-1)\times\frac{\sum_{i=1}^{35} {\rm Cap}_{i}(t)\,}{[\,\sum_{i=1}^{35} {\rm Cap}_{i}(t-1)\,\pm J\,]\,}$

with t the moment of calculation; Cap the free float market cap of a specific listing and J a coefficient used to adjust the index on the back of capital increases or other corporate actions so as to ensure continuity. The formula can be adjusted to accommodate changes in index structure, such as the temporary suspension of companies pending news.

=== Specification ===
IBEX Mini futures contracts are traded on the MEFF Renta Variable (MEFF-RV) exchange under the ticker symbol BIBX. The full contract specifications for IBEX Mini futures are listed below.

Contract Specification
IBEX Mini (BIBX)	
Exchange:	MEFF-RV
Sector:	Index
Tick Size:	0.1
Tick Value:	0.5 EUR
Big Point Value (BPV):	5
Denomination:	EUR
Decimal Place:	1

== Components ==
As of September 23, 2024, the following 35 companies make up the index:

Ticker	Company	Sector
ACS.MC	ACS	Construction
ACX.MC	Acerinox	Steel
AMS.MC	Amadeus IT Group	Tourism
ANA.MC	Acciona	Construction
ANE.MC	Acciona Energía	Energy
BBVA.MC	BBVA	Financial Services
BKT.MC	Bankinter	Financial Services
CABK.MC	CaixaBank	Financial Services
CLNX.MC	Cellnex Telecom	Telecommunications
COL.MC	Inmobiliaria Colonial	Real Estate
AENA.MC	AENA	Aviation
ELE.MC	Endesa	Energy
ENG.MC	Enagás	Energy
FDR.MC	Fluidra	Manufacturing
FER.MC	Ferrovial	Infrastructure
GRF.MC	Grifols	Pharmaceuticals
IAG.MC	International Airlines Group	Aviation
IBE.MC	Iberdrola	Energy
IDR.MC	Indra	Information Technology
ITX.MC	Inditex	Textile
LOG.MC	Logista	Logistics
MAP.MC	Mapfre	Insurance
MRL.MC	Merlin Properties	Real Estate
MTS.MC	ArcelorMittal	Steel
NTGY.MC	Naturgy	Energy
PUIG.MC	Puig	Clothes and Cosmetics
RED.MC	Redeia Corporación	Energy
REP.MC	Repsol	Oil and Gas
ROVI.MC	Laboratorios Rovi	Pharmaceuticals
SAB.MC	Banco Sabadell	Financial Services
SAN.MC	Santander	Financial Services
SCYR.MC	Sacyr	Construction
SLR.MC	Solaria	Solar Energy
TEF.MC	Telefónica	Telecommunications
UNI.MC	Unicaja	Financial Services

== Record values ==
The index reached the following record values:

Category	All-time highs		All-time lows	
Closing	16.208,40	29 October 2025 (12:15 CET)	1,873.58	5 October 1992
Intraday	16,150.10	29 October 2025	1.861,90	5 October 1992

== Annual returns ==
The following table shows the annual development of the IBEX 35 since 1992.

Year	Closing level	Change in Index in Points	Change in Index in %
1992	2,344.57		
1993	3,615.22	1,270.65	54.20
1994	3,087.68	−527.54	−14.59
1995	3,630.76	543.08	17.59
1996	5,154.77	1,524.01	41.97
1997	7,255.40	2,100.63	40.75
1998	9,836.60	2,581.20	35.58
1999	11,641.40	1,804.80	18.35
2000	9,109.80	−2,531.60	−21.75
2001	8,397.60	−712.20	−7.82
2002	6,036.90	−2,360.70	−28.11
2003	7,737.20	1,700.30	28.17
2004	9,080.80	1,343.60	17.37
2005	10,733.90	1,653,10	18.20
2006	14,146.50	3,412.60	31.79
2007	15,182.30	1,035.80	7.32
2008	9,195.80	−5,986.50	−39.43
2009	11,940.00	2,744.20	29.84
2010	9,859.10	2,080.90	−17.43
2011	8,566.30	−1,292.80	−13.11
2012	8,167.50	−398.80	−4.66
2013	9,916.70	1,749.50	21.42
2014	10,279.20	362.80	3.66
2015	9,544.50	−734.70	−7.15
2016	9,352.10	−192.10	−2.01
2017	10,043.90	691.80	7.40
2018	8,539.90	−1,504.00	−14.97
2019	9,549.20	1,009.30	11.82
2020	8,073.70	−1,475.50	−15.45
2021	8,713.80	640.10	7.93
2022	8,229.10	−484.70	−5.56
2023	10,102.10	1,873.02	22.76
2024	11,595.00	1,492.90	14.78
2025	17,307.80	5,712.80	49.27

== Related indices ==
- IBEX Medium Cap: It is composed by the 20 listed Spanish companies with the largest capitalization after those included in the IBEX 35.
- IBEX Small Cap: It is composed by the 30 listed Spanish companies with the largest capitalization after those included in the IBEX Medium Cap.
- IBEX Top Dividendo.
- BME Growth: a sub-market of Bolsas y Mercados Españoles (BME) for smaller companies to float shares with a more flexible regulatory system than is applicable to the main market.

== Past components ==
All changes are due to market capitalisation unless stated otherwise.

- Abengoa
- Abertis Infraestructuras
- Aceralia (merged with Arbed and Usinor to form Arcelor)
- Agromán
- Aguas de Barcelona
- Altadis
- Amper
- Antena 3 TV
- Arcelor
- Asland (not listed anymore)
- Asturiana de Zinc (not listed anymore)
- Autopistas del Mare Nostrum (renamed as Aurea, and merged in 2003 with ACESA to form Abertis)
- Banco Central (merged with Banco Hispano Americano to form Banco Central Hispano, which later merged with Banco Santander to form Banco Santander Central Hispano, renamed later as Banco Santander)
- Banco Hispano Americano (merged with Banco Central to form Banco Central Hispano, which later merged with Banco Santander to form Banco Santander Central Hispano, renamed later as Banco Santander)
- Banco Popular (acquired by Banco Santander)
- Banesto (acquired by Banco Santander)
- Bankia (acquired by CaixaBank)
- Bolsas y Mercados Españoles
- Carrefour
- Cintra (acquired by Ferrovial)
- Continente (merged with Pryca to form Carrefour)
- Corporación Financiera Alba
- Cortefiel
- Cristalería Española (not listed anymore)
- Distribuidora Internacional de Alimentación
- Dragados (acquired by ACS)
- Ebro Industrias Agrícolas (merged with Puleva to form Ebro Puleva, which later was renamed Ebro Foods)
- Energía e Industrias Aragonesas (not listed anymore)
- Ence
- Ercros
- Fadesa (not listed anymore)
- Fomento de Construcciones y Contratas
- FECSA (merged with Endesa)
- GESA (acquired by Endesa)
- Hidrocantábrico (acquired by EDP Group and renamed EDP España)
- Huarte (merged with Obrascón to form Obrascón Huarte, which later merged with Construcciones Lain to form Obrascón Huarte Lain)
- Iberia (merged with British Airways to form IAG)
- Jazztel (acquired by Orange España)
- Masmovil Ibercom
- Mediaset
- Moeve
- Movistar Móviles (acquired by Telefónica)
- NH Hoteles
- Obrascón Huarte Lain
- Picking Pack
- Portland Valderrivas
- Prisa
- Pryca (merged with Continente to form Carrefour)
- Puleva (merged with Ebro Industrias Agricolas to form Ebro Puleva, which later was renamed Ebro Foods)
- Radiotrónica (renamed as Avanzit)
- Red Eléctrica (renamed as Redeia Corporación)
- Sacyr
- Sarrió (not listed anymore)
- Sevillana de Electricidad (acquired by Endesa)
- Sol Meliá
- Técnicas Reunidas
- Telefónica Móviles (acquired by Telefónica)
- Telefónica Publicidad e Información (acquired by Yell)
- Telepizza
- Terra Networks (acquired by Telefónica)
- Tubacex
- Uralita
- Urbis
- Unión Fenosa (acquired by Gas Natural, later renamed as Naturgy)
- Vocento
- Yell Publicidad
- Zardoya Otis
- Zeltia

== See also ==
- Economy of Spain
