= PAI Partners =

French private equity firm

PAI Partners SAS
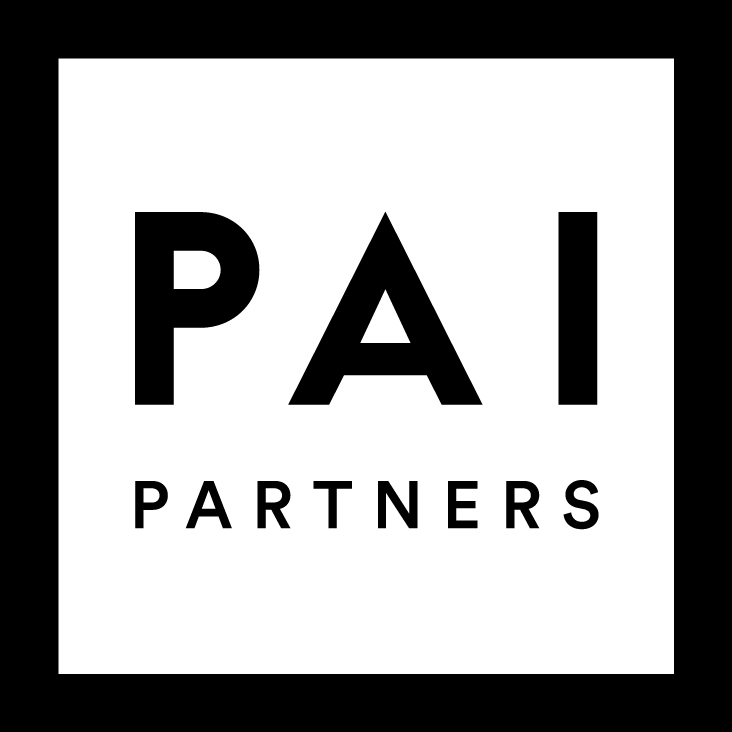

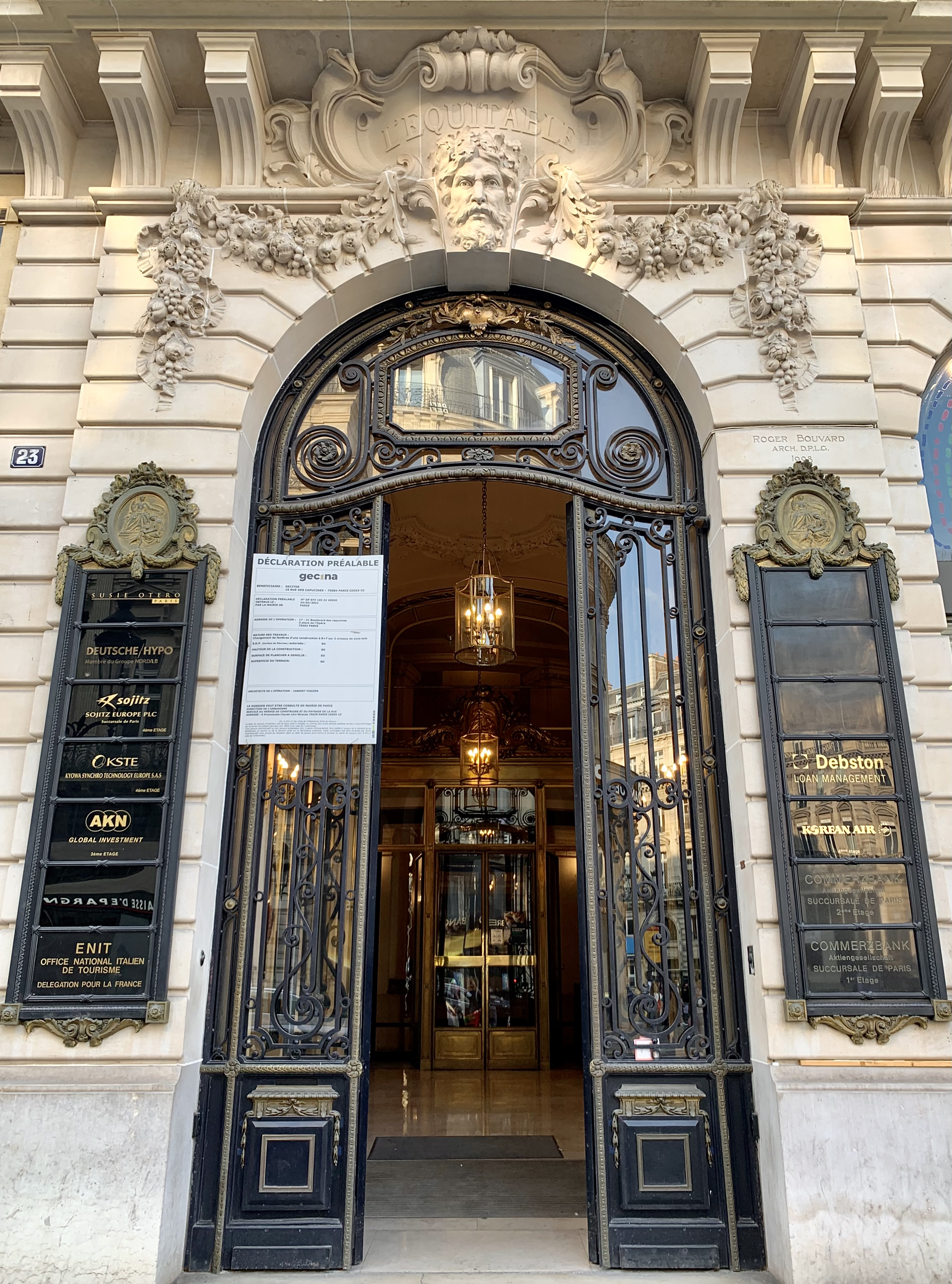
- Formerly: Paribas Affaires Industrielles
- Type: Private
- Industry: Private equity
- Founded: 1998; 28 years ago
- Headquarters: 23, rue de la Paix, Paris, France
- Key people: Michel Paris (chief executive officer); Frédéric Stevenin (chief information officer)
- Products: Private equity funds
- Total assets: €25.4 billion
- Number of employees: 180
- Website: www.paipartners.com

PAI Partners is a French private equity firm based in Paris. It is one of the oldest firms in the sector, with its origins dating back to Paribas Affaires Industrielles, historically the principal investment arm of Paribas, which started operations in 1872.

PAI manages €25.4 billion of dedicated buyout funds. Since 1994, PAI has completed 65 LBO transactions in 11 European countries, representing over €48 billion in transaction value. PAI has 62 agents from 10 countries and teams in Paris, London, Luxembourg, Madrid, Milan, Munich, Stockholm and New York City.

== History ==
PAI was formerly known as Paribas Affaires Industrielles, and was historically the principal investment arm of Paribas. PAI LBO Fund, established in 1998, was the first PAI investment vehicle managing third party capital. Prior to 1998, PAI invested exclusively on the balance sheet of BNP Paribas.

Paribas merged with Banque Nationale de Paris in 2000. In 1993, Amaury de Sèze joined Paribas Affaires Industrielles as chairman and chief executive officer. Under his leadership, PAI developed a strategy in private equity that capitalized on the team's familiarity with industrial sectors.

Paribas Affaires Industrielles led the €610 million buyout of Danone's pasta and condiment unit in 1997, at that time the largest leveraged buyout ever completed in France. The following year, the firm finalized fundraising for its first third party investment fund, raising €650 million of investor commitments. PAI completed a full spinout from BNP in 2000 and the following year raised a new €1.8 billion private equity fund.

In September 2009, Lionel Zinsou became CEO and chairman of the firm. In 2015, Michel Paris became CEO after Lionel Zinsou stepped down to become prime minister in Benin.

In March 2015, PAI raised its fifth LBO fund, PAI Europe VI, reaching €3.3 billion, above the initial target of €3 billion. In September 2017, PAI announced the raising of a seventh investment vehicle: PAI Europe VII. In March 2018, PAI closed their PAI Europe VII fund.

== Investment funds ==
=== Funds ===
Prior to 1998, PAI made investments via the Paribas Portfolio. The Paribas Portfolio was funded directly from Paribas’ balance sheet, largely unleveraged and comprising 51 investments, all of which have now been realised. Reflecting the broader investment remit of PAI at the time, it included control and non-control investments. Since 1998, PAI has raised five private equity funds, as detailed below:

PAI buyout funds since inception
Fund name	Vintage	Total commitment	Focus	Status
PAI LBO Fund	1998	€650 million	Buyout	Liquidated
PAI Europe III	2001	€1.8 billion	Buyout	Liquidated
PAI Europe IV	2005	€2.7 billion	Buyout	Liquidated
PAI Europe V	2008	€2.7 billion	Buyout	Exit phase
PAI Europe VI	2015	€3.3 billion	Buyout	Exit phase
PAI Mid-Market	2020	€918 million	Buyout	Investment phase
PAI Europe VII	2018	€5.1 billion	Buyout	Investment phase
PAI Partners VIII	2023	€7.1 billion	Buyout	Investment phase

== Detailed investments ==
Historically, PAI managed Paribas's stakes in large food and consumer goods companies across Europe: Royal Canin (European leader in dry pet food), Diana Ingredients (natural food ingredients), Evialis (animal feed), Saupiquet (ready meals), LDC (premium poultry), Navidul (cured ham – Spain), SOS Arana (rice – Spain) and helped them consolidate their respective sector. In 2021 PAI completed its largest ever investment with the $3.3 billion acquisition of Tropicana, Naked and other North American juice brands from PepsiCo. Previous transactions in consumer goods and services, healthcare as well as general industrial companies are highlighted below:

=== PAI VIII investments ===
Entry	Exit	Company Name	Business description	Country	Ref.
2023	Unrealised	Alphia	Pet food manufacturer	United States	
2023	Unrealised	Azets	Accounting, tax, payroll, audit and advirosy services to SMEs	United Kingdom	
2023	Unrealised	ECF	Hospitality and care equipment distributor	France	
2021	Unrealised	European Camping Group	Outdoor accommodation	France	
2023	Unrealised	Infra Group	Network infrastructure service provider	Belgium	
2023	Unrealised	The Looping Group	Leisure parks	France	
2023	Unrealised	NovaTaste	Taste innovation and ingredients	Austria	

=== PAI VII investments ===
Entry	Exit	Company Name	Business description	Country	Ref.
2021	Unrealised	Apave	Risk management	France	
2021	Unrealised	Apleona	Facility management services	Germany	
2019	Unrealised	Areas	Food and beverage travel retail	Spain	
2020	Unrealised	Armacell	Insulation and engineered foam products	Luxembourg	
2018	2022	Asmodee	Board, card and role playing game publisher and distributor	France	
2019	Unrealised	Ecotone	Healthy and sustainable food	France	
2021	Unrealised	Euro Ethnic Foods	Grocery products	France	
2021	Unrealised	Euro Camping Group	Outdoor accommodation	France	
2022	Unrealised	HKA	Risk mitigation consultancy	United Kingdom	
2021	Unrealised	Pasubio	Premium leather for the automotive industry	Italy	
2021	Unrealised	SGD Pharma	Primary glass packaging for the pharmaceutical industry	France	
2019	Unrealised	Stella Group	Sun protection	France	
2021	Unrealised	The Compleat Food Group	Chilled food platform	United Kingdom	
2022	Unrealised	Theramex	Women's health pharmaceuticals	United Kingdom	
2022	Unrealised	Tropicana Brands Group	Global juices brand	United States	
2022	Unrealised	Veonet	Ophthamology clinics platform	Germany	
2019	Unrealised	Zahneins	Dental company	Germany	

=== PAI Mid-Market investments ===
Entry	Exit	Company Name	Business description	Country	Ref.
2020	Unrealised	Amplitude Surgical	Global surgical technology for lower limb orthopaedics	France	
2020	Unrealised	Angulas Aguinaga	Refrigerated fish and seafood ready meals	Spain	
2023	Unrealised	European Pizza Group	Frozen pizza	Germany	
2023	Unrealised	La Compagnie des Desserts	Frozen desserts supplier	France	
2021	Unrealised	Interflora	European flower and gife digital platform	France	
2021	Unrealised	Scrigno	Integrated opening solutions	Italy	
2022	Unrealised	Uvesco	Spanish retail food sector	Spain	

=== PAI VI investments ===
Entry	Exit	Company Name	Business description	Country	Ref.
2018	Unrealised	Albéa	Global packaging company	France	
2016	2022	Atos Medical	Laryngectomy products	Sweden	
2016	2019	B&B Hotels	Budget hotel chain	France	
2014	2017	DomusVi	Elderly care	France	
2017	Unrealised	ELITech	Diagnostic equipment	Italy	
2016	Unrealised	Ethypharm	Specialty pharmaceuticals	France	
2014	Unrealised	EuroMediaGroup	Technical services to the audiovisual industry	France	
2014	2018	InnoVista Sensors (formerly CST)	Sensors and control products	United States	
2015	2019	Grupo Konecta	Business process outsourcing and contact centres	Spain	
2014	Unrealised	Labeyrie Fine Foods	Gourmet food	France	
2018	Unrealised	M Group Services	UK & Ireland infrastructure services	United Kingdom	
2018	2022	Refresco	Bottler of beverages	The Netherlands	
2016	2020	Roompot	Holiday parks	The Netherlands	
2017	Unrealised	Tendam	Apparel retailer	Spain	
2014	Unrealised	VPS	Vacant property services	United Kingdom	
2015	Unrealised	Yonderland	Outdoor equipment and fashion retailer	Belgium	
2018	Unrealised	World Freight Company	Air cargo sales and services	France	

=== PAI V investments ===
Entry	Exit	Company Name	Business description	Country	Ref.
2013	2017	ADB Safegate	Airfield ground lighting	Belgium	
2008	2015	Atos	IT service provider	France	
2010	2017	Cerba European Lab	Specialised biology laboratory	France	
2013	Unrealised	Froneri (formerly R&R Ice Cream)	Take-home ice cream manufacturer	United Kingdom	
2011	2016	Hunkemöller	Lingerie retailer	The Netherlands	
2013	2017	Group IPH	Industrial supplies distributor	France	
2011	2017	Kiloutou	Equipment rental services	France	
2012	2019	Marcolin	Eyewear design and manufacturing	Italy	
2011	2016	Swissport	Global ground and cargo aircraft handling services	Switzerland	
2011	2014	The Nuance Group	Travel retail and duty-free industry	Switzerland	
2008	2017	Xella	Aircrete blocks	Germany	

=== PAI IV investments ===
Entry	Exit	Company Name	Business description	Country	Ref.
2005	2012	Chr. Hansen	Natural food ingredients	Denmark	
2005	2017	Cortefiel	Apparel retailer	Spain	
2005	2016	Global Closure Systems (aka GCS)	Plastic closures	France	
2007	2017	Kaufman & Broad	Developer and builder of homes	France	
2005	2011	Kwik-Fit	Automotive fast-fit	United Kingdom	
2007	2009	Monier	Roofing products	France	
2005	2023	Perstorp	Specialty chemical ingredients used for coatings	Sweden	
2006	2011	Spie	Multitechnical services	France	
2006	2014	United Biscuits	Biscuits and snacks	United Kingdom	

=== Previous investments ===
- Amora Maille: Sauces and condiments; acquired from Danone in 1997 sold to Unilever in 1999
- Antargaz: Propane and butane provision; sold to UGI Corporation in 2004
- Carglass: vehicle glass repair and replacement group
- Elis SA: Textile rental, hygiene services
- Gerflor: PVC flooring
- Groupe Lapeyre: Distribution of construction material
- Ipsen: Pharmaceutical laboratory
- VIA-GTI (known as Keolis): Transport; acquired 1995 and sold in 1999 to SNCF
- Panzani-Lustucru: Pasta and pasta sauces; acquired in 1997 from Danone, sold to Puleva en 2005
- Point P: Construction material distributor;
- Provimi: Animal nutrition
- Royal Canin: Animal nutrition for dogs and cats, sold to Mars Incorporated in 2002
- SAUR: Water distribution, sanitation and waste management services
- Saeco: Coffee machine manufacturer
- Vivarte: Shoe and women wear retailer; sold in 2007 to Charterhouse Capital Partners
- William Saurin: Canned ready meals; sold to Financière Turenne Lafayette (FTL) in 2001
- Yoplait: 51% share: Fresh dairy products, sold to General Mills in 2011
