= Audax (energy company) =

Spanish energy supplier

Audax Renovables, S.A.
- Type: Sociedad Anónima
- Traded as: BMAD: ADX
- Industry: Electric utility
- Founded: 1 June 2000; 26 years ago
- Founder: José Elías Navarro
- Headquarters: Calle Electrónica 19; 08915 Badalona (Barcelona), Spain
- Area served: Spain, Portugal, Germany, Poland, Netherlands, Hungary, Italy, France, Panama
- Products: Electricity generation and distribution, renewable energy, natural gas production, sale and distribution, telecommunications
- Production output: 15.9 TWh (2025)
- Revenue: ▼€1.884 M (2025)
- Operating income: ▼€115.6M (2025)
- Net income: ▼€43.5 M (2025)
- Subsidiaries: Excelsior Times; Unieléctrica
- Website: www.audaxenergy.com

Audax Renovables, S.A., trading as Audax, is a Spanish electricity and natural gas company headquartered in Badalona, Catalonia. It supplies electricity and gas to end customers in several European countries and generates electricity from renewable sources using wind and solar photovoltaic technology. Formerly known as Fersa Energías Renovables, it is listed on the Madrid Stock Exchange under the ticker ADX and has been a constituent of the IBEX Small Cap index since March 2020.

== History ==
=== Fersa Energías Renovables (2000–2016) ===
The company was founded in 2000 as Fersa Energías Renovables, a developer and operator of wind farms. It began trading on the Barcelona stock exchange in 2003 and joined the Spanish continuous market in 2007.

=== Takeover by Audax Energía (2016–2019) ===
In May 2016 the electricity and gas retailer Audax Energía, controlled by José Elías Navarro, launched a takeover bid for Fersa that valued the company at about €70 million. The bid was cleared by Spain's Comisión Nacional del Mercado de Valores in July 2016, and by August about 70.9% of Fersa's shares had been tendered; Francisco José Elías Navarro became chairman. Fersa was renamed Audax Renovables in 2017, and in 2018 Audax Energía was subsequently merged into the listed company.

=== International expansion (2013–2020) ===
The retail business expanded across Europe over the following years, entering Portugal in 2013, Italy in 2014 through the acquisition of the retailer Big Energia, Germany in 2015, and Poland in 2016 through the acquisition of Deltis Energia. In 2017 it acquired a 72% stake in the Dutch retailer Main Energie, and in 2020 it entered Hungary by acquiring the electricity retailer E.ON Energiakereskedelmi.

=== Recent developments (2023–present) ===
In February 2023 Audax signed a strategic agreement with Shell Energy Europe under which Shell became the exclusive supplier of electricity and gas to the group in Spain through a market-access arrangement.

In March 2026 the group shortened its commercial name from Audax Renovables to Audax as part of a rebranding. In April 2026 it entered the Spanish telecommunications market as a mobile virtual network operator, reselling the network of MasOrange under its own brand.

In June 2026 Audax announced its intention to launch a voluntary all-cash takeover offer for the Norwegian energy retailer Elmera Group, listed on the Oslo Stock Exchange, at 41.2 Norwegian kroner per share, valuing the company at about 4.5 billion kroner (about US$456 million). The bid, conditional on a minimum acceptance of 66.7%, represented a premium of roughly 39% to Elmera's previous closing price. On the same day Elmera disclosed that it had received a competing, non-binding approach from another party at a "significantly higher" price and had entered an exclusivity and due-diligence agreement with that party.

== Operations ==
Audax supplies electricity and natural gas to residential, commercial and industrial customers in Spain, Portugal, Germany, Poland, the Netherlands, Hungary and Italy. In generation, it operates wind farms in Spain, France, Poland and Panama and photovoltaic plants in Spain, Portugal and Italy, with a combined portfolio of about 1,037 MW. For the 2025 financial year the group reported revenue of €1,884 million, down about 5% year on year, and net profit of €43.5 million.

== Regulatory action ==
In October 2022 the Comisión Nacional de los Mercados y la Competencia (CNMC), Spain's competition regulator, fined companies of the Audax group a combined €9.26 million for a pattern of unfair commercial practices used between January 2018 and October 2021 to switch domestic electricity and gas customers away from rival retailers.
