= María Dolores Dancausa =

Spanish non-executive Chair

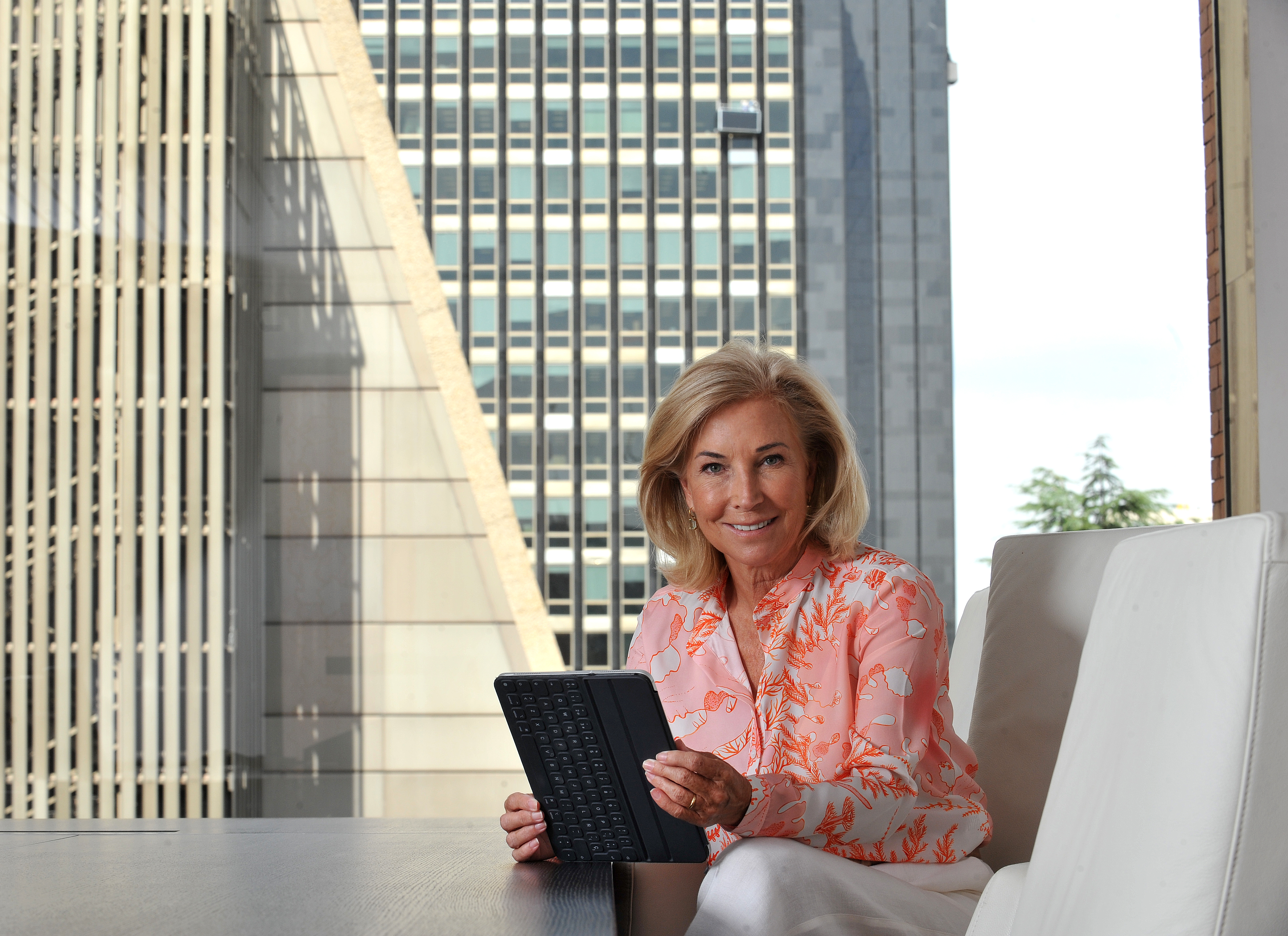
- Born: María Dolores Dancausa Treviño; 1959 (age 66–67); Burgos, Spain
- Education: Colegio Universitario San Pablo CEU
- Occupation: Non-executive Chair of Bankinter

María Dolores Dancausa Treviño (born 1959) is a Spanish executive. Since March 2024 she has held the position of non-executive Chair of Bankinter, one of Spain's leading financial institutions, having previously held the position of Chief Executive Officer since October 2010.

== Early life and education ==
Dancausa holds a degree in Law from the Colegio Universitario San Pablo CEU. She participated in several management programmes at Harvard Business School and completed an Advanced Management Programme at INSEAD.

== Career ==
Dancausa began her career at Banco Exterior de España before joining Bankinter. She was appointed as CEO of Linea Directa Aseguradora in 2008, becoming the first female CEO in the auto insurance sector.

In October 2010, she was appointed as CEO of Bankinter. At the time she was the only woman leading an IBEX 35 company. During her time in office, Bankinter purchased Barclays’ Portugal-based non-core assets for about 175 million euros in 2015.

Since March 2024, she has held the position of Non-Executive Chairwoman of Bankinter. In addition, since 2021 she has been an independent director of Acciona, and since April 2024 she has been an external independent director of Puig Brands.

== Other activities ==
- Acciona, Independent Member of the Board of Directors (since 2021)
- Esure, Independent Member of the Board of Directors (2013-2018)

== Recognition ==
In 2013, Dancausa was chosen by Forbes as the best CEO in Spain. In 2016, she finished third.
