= Laboratorios Farmaceuticos Rovi =

Spanish pharmaceutical company

Laboratorios Farmaceuticos Rovi SA
- Traded as: BMAD: ROVI
- Headquarters: Spain
- Number of employees: 1,419 (2024)
- Website: www.rovi.es/en

Laboratorios Farmaceuticos Rovi SA is a Spanish pharmaceutical company.

The company is a member of the IBEX 35 stock market index.

== History ==
Laboratorios Farmaceuticos Rovi was founded in 1946.

== Finances ==
In 2024, the company's revenue was €763.7 million, a 7.9% decrease from 2023. Net profit was €136.9 million.
