= Kyero =

British online property portal

- Type: Private
- Industry: Real estate
- Founded: 2003
- Founders: Louise Dell, Martin Dell
- Headquarters: Bath, England
- Area served: Spain, Portugal, France and Italy
- Website: www.kyero.com

Kyero is a British online property portal operated by Portal47 Ltd. Founded in 2003 by Louise and Martin Dell, the company specialises in residential property in Spain, Portugal, France and Italy.The company has been covered in British and Spanish media in relation to the overseas property market and a proposed acquisition by the Spanish property portal Idealista that was abandoned in 2025 following regulatory scrutiny.

== History ==
Kyero was founded in 2003 by Louise and Martin Dell after relocating from the United Kingdom to Spain. The website initially focused on residential property in Spain before expanding to Portugal, France and Italy. In 2010, The Guardian reported that Kyero listed around 100,000 Spanish properties from approximately 1,500 estate agents, reflecting the size of the overseas property market following the financial crisis. In 2021, The Negotiator reported that Kyero had introduced a freemium commercial model under which estate agents could advertise properties without charge while paying for enhanced promotional services.

== Proposed acquisition by Idealista ==
In December 2024, Idealista announced an agreement to acquire Portal47 Ltd, the company operating Kyero, subject to approval by competition authorities in Spain and Portugal. In June 2025, Portugal's competition authority opened an in-depth investigation into the proposed acquisition. The transaction subsequently became the subject of regulatory scrutiny in Spain. In September 2025, Idealista announced that it would withdraw from the acquisition, stating that conditions proposed by Spain's Comisión Nacional de los Mercados y la Competencia (CNMC) exceeded the scope of the transaction. The CNMC subsequently archived the case after Idealista withdrew its notification of the proposed concentration. Contemporary media reports described the withdrawal as the result of regulatory scrutiny in Spain and Portugal.

== Reception ==
Kyero has been cited by British and international media in reporting on overseas residential property markets, including trends in foreign demand for homes in Spain.

== See also ==
- Property portal
