= Ence =

Ence may refer to:

- Ence (company), a Spanish multinational company
- Ence (esports), a Finnish esports organization
