= Bankinter =

Bank in Madrid, Spain

Bankinter, S.A.

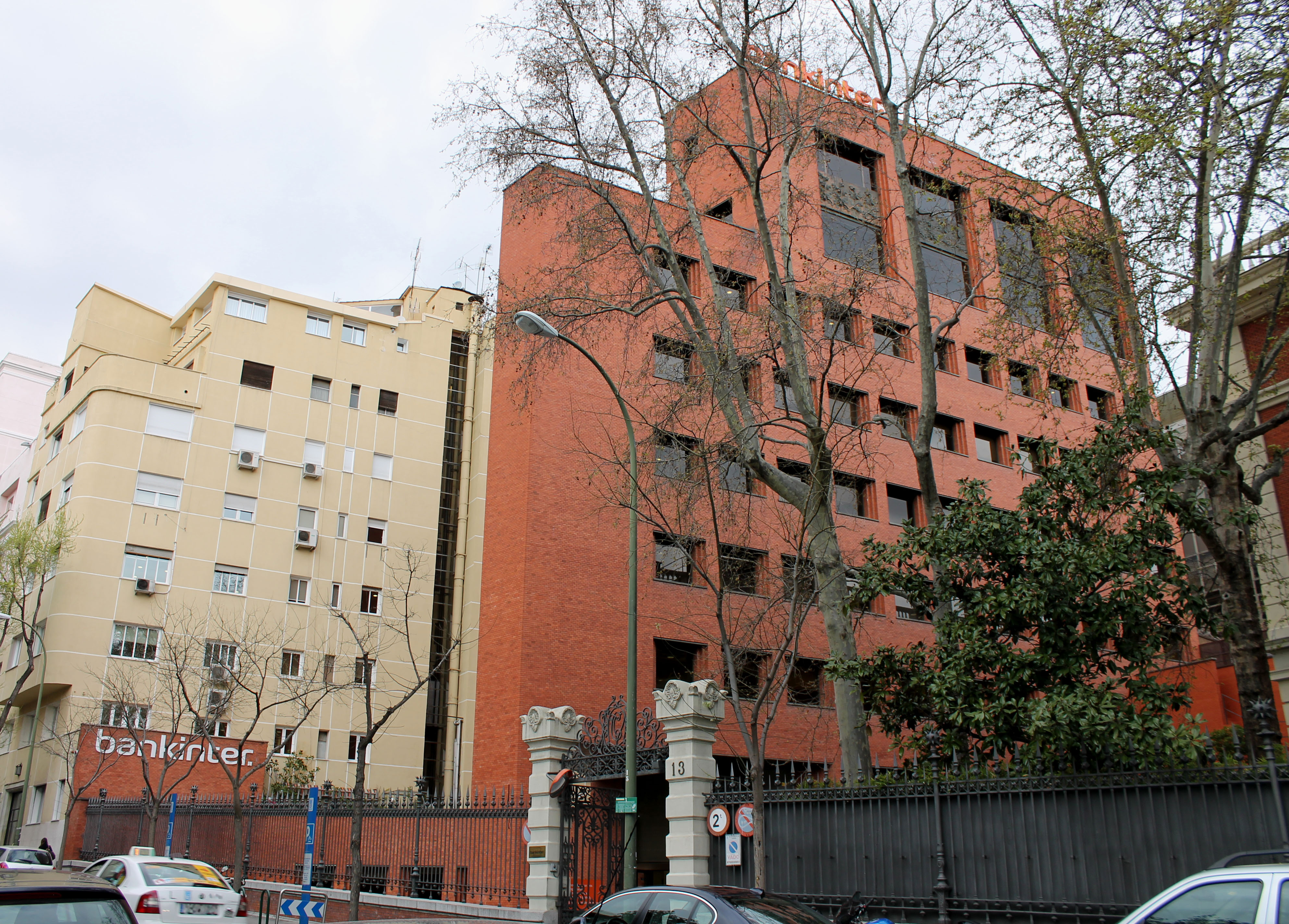
- Headquarters in Madrid, Spain
- Formerly: Banco Intercontinental Español
- Type: Sociedad Anónima
- Traded as: BMAD: BKT; IBEX 35
- ISIN: ES0113679I37
- Industry: Financial services
- Founded: June 1965; 61 years ago
- Headquarters: Madrid, Spain
- Key people: María Dolores Dancausa; Non-executive Chair; Gloria Ortiz (CEO)
- Products: Retail and business banking
- Revenue: ▲€1.391 billion (2019)
- Operating income: ▲€2.054 billion (2019)
- Net income: ▲€550.665 million (2019)
- Total assets: ▲€131,018 billion (2025)
- Total equity: ▲€4.799 billion (2019)
- Number of employees: ▲6,078 (2019)
- Website: www.bankinter.com

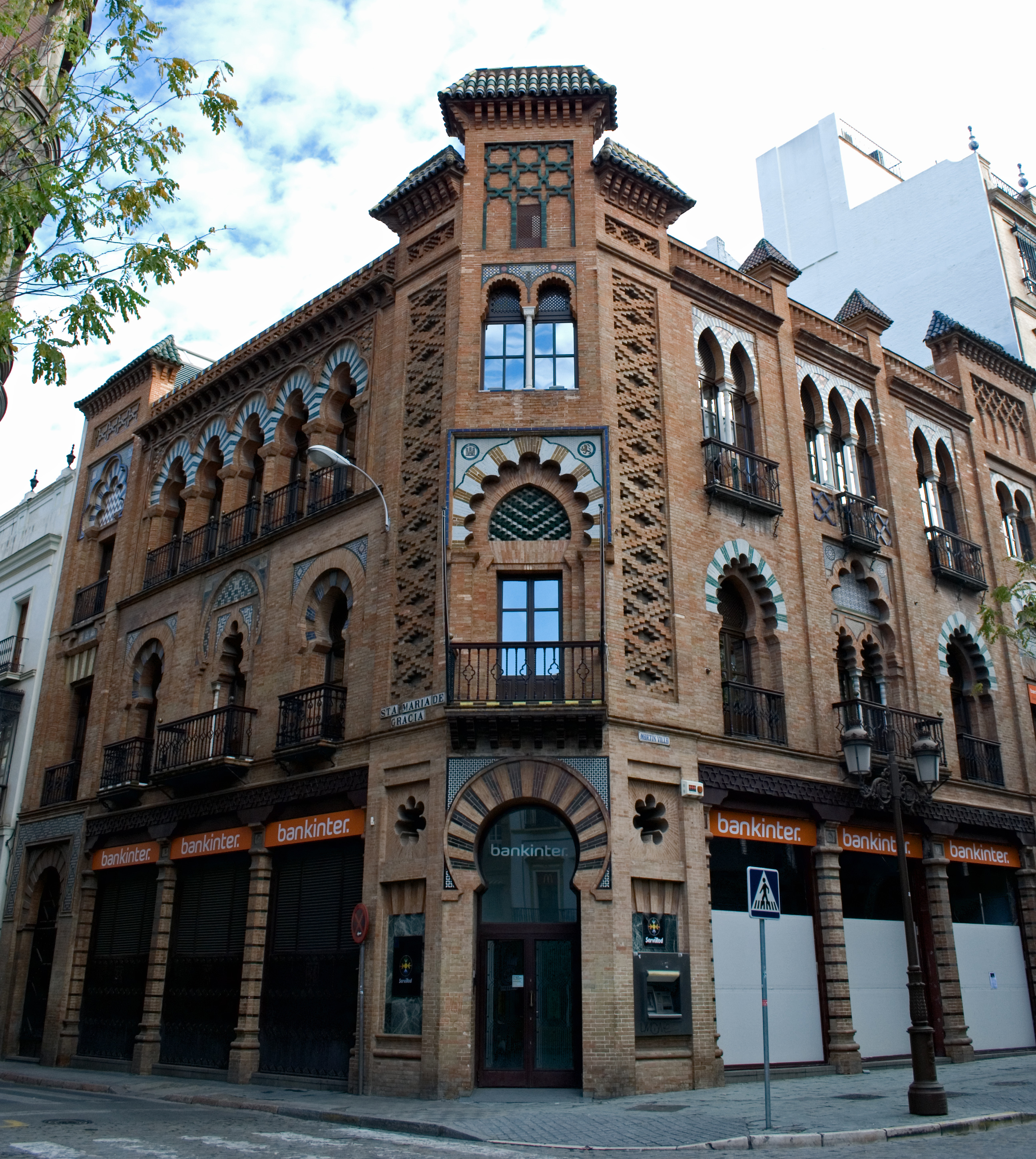
The Bankinter building in Seville, designed by architect Aníbal González (1907-1909).

Bankinter, S.A. (Spanish pronunciation: [baŋˈkinteɾ]), is a Spanish financial services company headquartered in Madrid. It has been listed on the Bolsa de Madrid since 1972, and is part of the Ibex35 Index. It was founded in 1965 as an industrial bank through a joint venture between Banco Santander and Bank of America.

Bankinter has been designated as a Significant Institution since the entry into force of European Banking Supervision in late 2014, and as a consequence is directly supervised by the European Central Bank.

== History ==
Bankinter was founded under the name Banco Intercontinental Español in June 1965 as an industrial bank through a joint venture by Banco de Santander and BankAmerica. In 1972 the bank became fully independent of its founders and transformed itself into a commercial bank.

In 1993, the bank embarked up on a growth strategy with Banca Partnet and Red Agencial. In the same year, it became the first digital bank, following the successful introduction of electronic banking. In 2006, the brand was transformed.

In 2009, Bankinter purchased 50% of the insurance company Direct Line from The Royal Bank of Scotland.

In September 2015, Bankinter announced the acquisition of Barclays' retail business in Portugal, consisting of 84 offices, and Barclays Life and Pensions, the latter in a joint-venture with Mapfre. The bank paid approximately €100 million for Barclays' Portuguese subsidiary and €37.5 million for the 50% stake in the insurance company.

In May 2019, Bankinter acquired EVO Banco, incorporating its 452,000 clients.

Bankinter trades as Avant Money, which began as MBNA Ireland, in the Republic of Ireland.

In April 2021, the spin-off and IPO of Línea Directa took place, reducing Bankinter's stake from 100% to 17.4% and generating capital gains of nearly 1 billion euros.

In August 2023, the European Commission approved the acquisition of the Portuguese payment service provider Universo IME by Sonae, also from Portugal, and Bankinter Consumer Finance (BKCF).

== Office network ==
As of September 30, 2021, Bankinter had a network of 446 offices and 6,119 employees.

== See also ==
- List of banks in the euro area
- List of banks in Spain
