= Cani Fernández =

- Born: Cani Fernández Vicién; 1963 (age 62–63); Cartagena
- Occupation: lawyer
- Known for: President of Comisión Nacional de los Mercados y la Competencia (2020-)

Cani Fernández (Cartagena, 1963) is a Spanish lawyer who currently serves as president of the National Commission on Markets and Competition (CNMC) since June 2020.

Expert in European Union law, Fernández Vicién was a partner in the Competition Law area of the Cuatrecasas law firm, a firm where she has worked since the 90s, being the second female partner to join it. Briefly, in 2020, she joined the Cabinet of the Presidency of the Government of Spain as an advisor, until her appointment as president of the CNMC.

== Trajectory ==
Fernández Vicién was born in Cartagena, Spain in 1963. She is the daughter of parents from Aragon and graduated in law from the University of Zaragoza in 1986. She also holds a master's degree in European Union Law from the Université Libre de Bruxelles. She speaks English and French.

In the early 90s, she moved to Luxembourg, serving as a lawyer at the Court of Justice of the European Union (CJEU) between 1994 and 1997, and has also been a professor at the University Carlos III of Madrid since 2001, and subsequently at the Barcelona Graduate School of Economics (BGSE) and the Toulouse School of Economics. After her time at the CJEU, she joined the Cuatrecasas law firm, where she has developed most of her professional life ever since, going on to direct the firm's office in Brussels and the European Union law group.

Within the firm, she has participated in important operations, such as the takeover bid for Endesa by Enel and Acciona, the sale of Agbar to Suez, or the sale of Canal+ to Grupo Prisa. One of the processes she dedicated the most time to was the floor clauses in mortgages, representing Banco Popular, losing the case. She was also one of the legal advisors for Uber before the European courts.

She also defended Volkswagen in the case of the car and dealership cartel that the CNMC dismantled in 2015, and the paper company Saica for another case of collusion in the sector, as well as Mediaset in the investigation of anti-competitive behaviour in the advertising market by the group and Atresmedia.

In 2018, she received the Outstanding Contribution to the Legal Profession award. In 2019, she ran as a candidate for the firm's Chief Executive Officer, meaning to direct it, but lost to Jorge Badía.

In early 2020, she took a leave of absence from the firm after being chosen by President Pedro Sánchez to join the team of advisors in the Cabinet of the Presidency of the Government, then led by Iván Redondo.

In May 2020, she was proposed by the government of Pedro Sánchez as president of the National Commission on Markets and Competition (CNMC). After passing the evaluation of the Economic Affairs Committee of the Congress of Deputies, she was appointed by the Council of Ministers in mid-June 2020.
