= International University of La Rioja =

Private university in Logroño, La Rioja, Spain

- Universidad Internacional de La Rioja (UNIR)
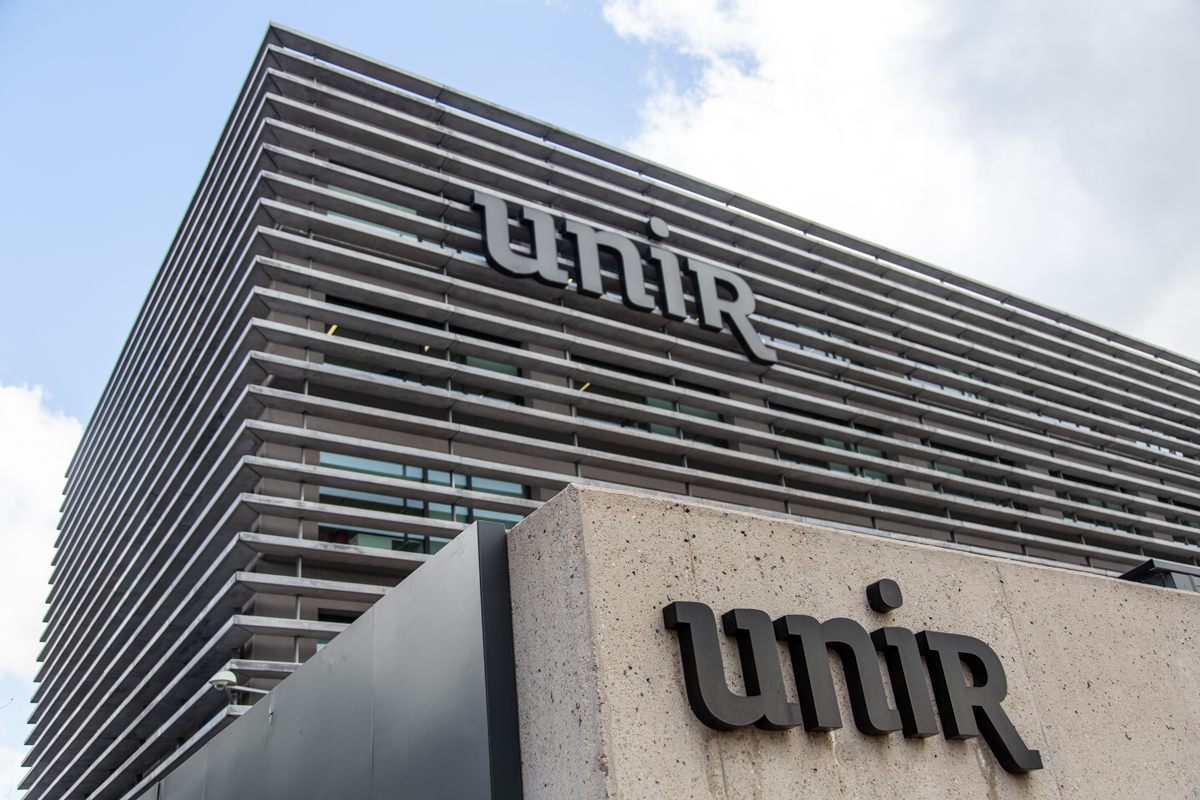
- Rector's office
- Other names: UNIR
- Type: Private
- Established: 2008
- President: Rafael Puyol Antolín
- Rector: José María Vázquez García-Peñuela
- Students: 45,000
- Location: Avenida de la Paz, 137, 26006, Logroño, La Rioja, Spain; 42°27′44″N 2°25′27″W
- Colors: Blue and black
- Website: www.unir.net
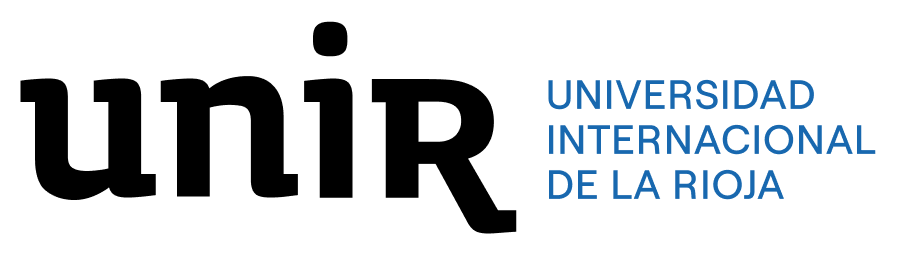

The International University of La Rioja (Spanish: Universidad Internacional de La Rioja), often simply referred to as UNIR, is a Spanish private university located in Logroño, La Rioja. It has also campuses in Mexico, Colombia, Peru and Ecuador. As of February 2025, the university enrolled more than 90,000 students from 86 countries, mainly from Spain and Latin America.

In Spain, UNIR offers 55 bachelor's degree programs, 155 official master's degrees, and four doctoral programs, all accredited by the National Agency for Quality Assessment and Accreditation (ANECA) and framed within the European Higher Education Area (EHEA). It also offers 83 proprietary degrees and advanced study programs in various fields of knowledge.

UNIR is characterized by offering a distance synchronous learning. Its learning system is supported by interactive video conferences which are streamed directly from campus. The lessons are recorded to allow students flexible, off-time access. The teacher-student relationship is interactive, personalized, and closely mirrors that of a traditional on-campus experience. The learning environment includes forums, videoconferences, webinars, virtual whiteboards, and online laboratories, supported by reference materials, faculty-prepared notes, and personalized tutorials. Its pedagogical model is designed to meet labor market demands, positioning education as a tool for social transformation by removing geographical and personal barriers and promoting students’ academic, professional, and personal development.

== History ==
UNIR started its academic activity in 2009. The university follows the general provisions established by the Organic Law of the University System (LOSU), the guidelines issued by the European Union and the norms set by the Government of Spain and the Regional Government of La Rioja. Its structure, organization and operation have been designed according to the European Higher Education Area (EHEA) parameters and requirements.

With the 31% of its enrolled students distributed in 90 countries worldwide, the Universidad Internacional de La Rioja aims to become a global university and an international academic reference. 60,000 students have graduated from UNIR from its inception to the middle of the 2018–2019 academic school year. This university created the role of personal tutors in modern distance education. These personal tutors support students by arranging different meetings with them in order to follow-up their learning and encourage them to meet the challenges and opportunities of university life. The personal tutoring system aims to be completely adapted to the personal and professional circumstances of each student.

On 8 March 2019, the Universidad Internacional de La Rioja, an active member of the regional Proeduca Altus group, became a publicly traded company in the Mercado Alternativo Bursátil (MAB) of Spain. In 2020 UNIR launched its institute for digital experts, EDIX, specialized in high-employability University Expert Certificates aimed at professionals who want to upgrade skills and retrain during their working life through programmes with a strong digital and technological component whose objective is to develop digital experts.

== Faculties and schools ==
UNIR structures its academic activity through a number of faculties and schools:

- Faculty of Education and Humanities
- Faculty of Health Sciences
- Faculty of Economics and Business
- Faculty of Law
- Faculty of Arts and Social Sciences
- Higher School of Engineering and Technology (ESIT)
- School of Languages
- Doctoral School

== UNIR in Latin America ==
In 2013 UNIR adapted its academic offer in order to internationalize the courses taught in Spain to the Spanish-speaker alumni from all over the world.

=== Mexico ===
UNIR México is a private university officially recognized by the Mexican Secretariat of Public Education (SEP). Its academics are entirely adapted to Mexico's standards. Its bachelor's and master's degrees are fully accredited and are registered with the national education system of the Secretariat of Public Education (SEP) in Mexico. The International University of La Rioja in Mexico offers 5 Bachelor's degrees and 21 Master's degrees, in addition to official European masters and diplomas.

=== Colombia ===
With headquarters in Bogotá, UNIR offers online teaching and more than 1,300 courses recognized by the National Education Ministry of the Government of Colombia thanks to an agreement between Spain and Colombia about the mutual recognition of academic degrees and programmes. UNIR Colombia has more than 5,000 students enrolled and 8,000 graduates. Furthermore, the Fundación Universitaria Internacional de La Rioja-UNIR Colombia, constituted under the Colombian law, was officially approved by the National Education Ministry in 2017. UNIR Colombia has four undergraduate programmes.

=== Ecuador ===
In July 2016 UNIR was the first university successfully evaluated under the new online universities evaluation procedure defined by the SENESCYT of Ecuador, which was based on the regulation for open studies and academic programmes published by the Higher Education Council of Ecuador. By the end of 2019 UNIR Ecuador had more than 9,000 students.

=== Other regions of Latin America and USA ===
In mid-2019 the Proeduca Group, which UNIR is part of, acquired the Marconi International University (MIU) sited in Florida, in the United States of America, and the Neumann Business School located in Lima, Peru.

== Honorary Doctorates ==
- Santiago Muñoz Machado, Director of the Royal Spanish Academy (RAE) and President of the Association of Academies of the Spanish Language (ASALE).
- Susana Cordero de Espinosa, Director of the Ecuadorian Academy of Language.
- Gonzalo Celorio Blasco, Director of the Mexican Academy of Language.
- Juan Carlos Vergara Silva, Director of the Colombian Academy of Language.

== Major publications ==
- Revista Española de Pedagogía
- IJIMAI
- Nueva Revista de Política, Cultura y Arte
- Misostenido
- UNIR Revista

== Awards ==
- In 2025, UNIR received the highest rating of five stars in the QS World University Rankings, placing it among the best online universities in the world. This recognition evaluates aspects such as teaching quality, educational technology, student support, employability, and institutional innovation.
- In 2024, UNIR was recognized by Times Higher Education (THE) as the top Spanish-speaking online university in the world, according to the Online Learning Ranking 2024. THE also ranked it as the best private online Spanish university in Education, placing it among the top 500 universities worldwide and acknowledging its contribution to the Sustainable Development Goals (SDGs).
- In 2022, Times Higher Education named UNIR the best online university in the “International Outlook” category. THE is one of the three most influential global rankings and evaluates universities with a strong research profile. UNIR stood out for its international perspective and research capacity.
- In 2020 and 2022, UNIR achieved the first national position in Teaching in the U-Ranking of Spanish Universities, prepared by the BBVA Foundation and the Valencian Institute of Economic Research (IVIE).
- In 2019, UNIR was awarded the Medal of La Rioja, the highest honor granted by the regional Government of La Rioja to institutions that have notably promoted public regional interests.
- In 2018, it received the “Best International University Award” from the Mundo Ciudad Foundation at the Educational Excellence Awards.
- For three consecutive years (2018, 2019, and 2020), UNIR ranked first in the FSO Ranking of higher education institutions offering online programs in Spanish, a ranking prepared by the Hamilton consultancy and the Emagister web portal.
- In 2018, UNIR's MBA was recognized as the best official online MBA in Spanish worldwide, according to the FSO 2018 ranking, specialized in online higher education.
- It has also received the Mercurio Business Award (2012) and the Prever Award (2011) in the category of companies and institutions.
