= EVO Banco =

Spanish bank

EVO Banco, S.A.U
- Company type: Sociedad Anónima Unipersonal
- Industry: Financial services
- Predecessor: NCG Banco, S.A.
- Founded: A Coruña, Spain (October 16, 2013)
- Headquarters: Madrid, Spain
- Number of locations: 80 branches
- Area served: Nationwide
- Key people: José Luis Abelleira, CEO
- Services: Retail banking; Commercial banking
- Owner: Bankinter
- Number of employees: 590
- Website: www.evobanco.com

EVO Banco, S.A.U. is a Spanish bank based in Madrid.

EVO Banco was created by NCG Banco on March 12, 2012, as a division that would operate its assets outside the autonomous communities of Galicia, Asturias and the Province of León. As part of their launch campaign it introduced its main financial product: Cuenta Inteligente. In the four initial weeks EVO Banco had managed to attract 8,290 clients and 70 million euros.

== First acquisition ==
On September 9, 2013, NCG Banco announced that it would sell the EVO Banco division to the American private equity firm Apollo Global Management for 60 million euros.

On October 16, 2013, EVO Banco, S.A. was established as a subsidiary of NCG Banco, S.A.

== Second acquisition ==
In May 2019, Spanish bank Bankinter acquired Evo Banco, incorporating its 452,000 clients. In September 2019, it announced that, as of October 18, only the Madrid office would remain operational.

In March 2021, it announced that, effective around May 1, it would relocate its only physical office and corporate headquarters to another location nearby.

In June 2024, Bankinter announced that it would absorb Evo Banco, with the aim of enhancing the digital capabilities of the first entity, as well as reducing costs and improving profitability.

== See also ==
- List of banks in Spain
