= BME Scaleup =

- Type: Stock Exchange
- Location: Madrid, Spain
- Founded: 2024
- Owner: Bolsas y Mercados Españoles
- Key people: Jesús González Nieto, chairman
- Currency: EUR
- No. of listings: 37

BME Scaleup is a specific segment of the Multilateral Trading System (MTF) equity market operated by Bolsas y Mercados Españoles (BME), the Spanish company that manages the country's stock exchanges and financial markets. Created in 2023 and launched in 2024 to serve as a first step for companies to finance through the securities market, BME Scaleup is primarily directed at early-stage companies with a proven and scalable business model, as well as more mature businesses seeking increased visibility and valuation from new investors.It features a simplified and more accessible regulation and incorporation process compared to other BME segments, such as BME Growth. Companies admitted must be a Sociedad Anónima (Spanish Public Limited Company or equivalent foreign company) and commit to certain transparency and reporting requirements, including providing duly audited annual financial information and appointing a Registered Advisor to guide them through the process and their time on the market. Unlike BME Growth, a minimum shareholder diffusion (free float) is not a mandatory requirement for joining BME Scaleup, allowing companies to decide on the timing and extent of opening their capital to investors.

The creation of BME Scaleup is part of a broader strategy to support the growth of high-potential scale-up companies by providing them with a route to capital markets. It aims to bridge the gap between initial startup funding and full-fledged public listing. The Spanish National Securities Market Commission (CNMV) authorizes BME Scaleup, which also retains supervisory roles, particularly concerning market abuse regulations, ensuring a monitored yet flexible ecosystem for growth-focused firms. Its director is Jesús González Nieto. In November 2025 it had 37 listed companies.
