= Royal Canin =

Dog and cat feed manufacturer

Royal Canin SAS

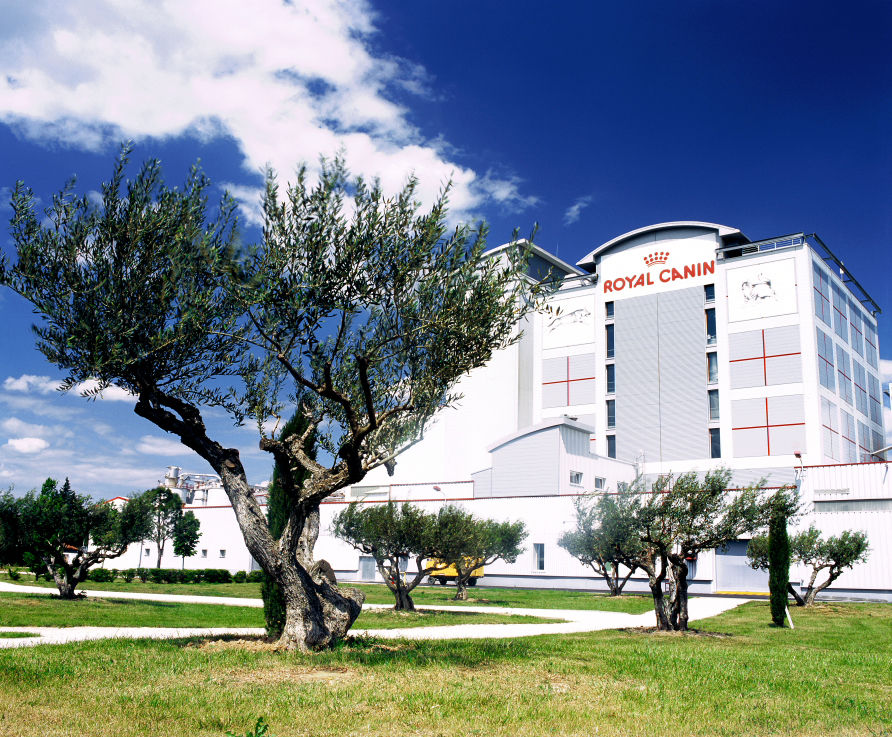
- Headquarters in Aimargues, France
- Type: Subsidiary
- Industry: Pet food
- Founded: 1968; 58 years ago in Gard, France
- Founder: Jean Cathary
- Headquarters: Aimargues, Gard, France
- Area served: Worldwide
- Key people: Cécile Coutens (CEO)
- Products: Dog and cat food, animal health nutrition products, veterinary products
- Parent: Mars Inc. (2002–present)
- Website: royalcanin.com

Royal Canin (French: [ʁwajal kanɛ̃]) is a division of the American group Mars Inc., and a French manufacturer and global supplier of cat and dog food. It conducts research on the specific nutritional needs of dogs and cats.

The company was established in 1968 by French veterinary surgeon Jean Cathary, after he successfully treated a number of skin and coat conditions in dogs by feeding them a cereal-based diet he prepared in his garage. He realized that nutrition was an important part of pets' health. After importing an extruder from the United States, a process first used in the pet food industry in 1956, the company was the first to manufacture dry pet food in France. Aimed primarily at breeders, production steadily increased and distribution expanded across the European market. Royal Canin was sold to the Guyomarc'h Group in 1972, and underwent a further period of expansion, especially in the area of research and development, before being purchased by Paribas Affaires Industrielles (PAI) in 1990. The company was floated on the French stock exchange but was later delisted after it was sold to Mars, Inc. in 2002.

== History ==
=== Early history ===
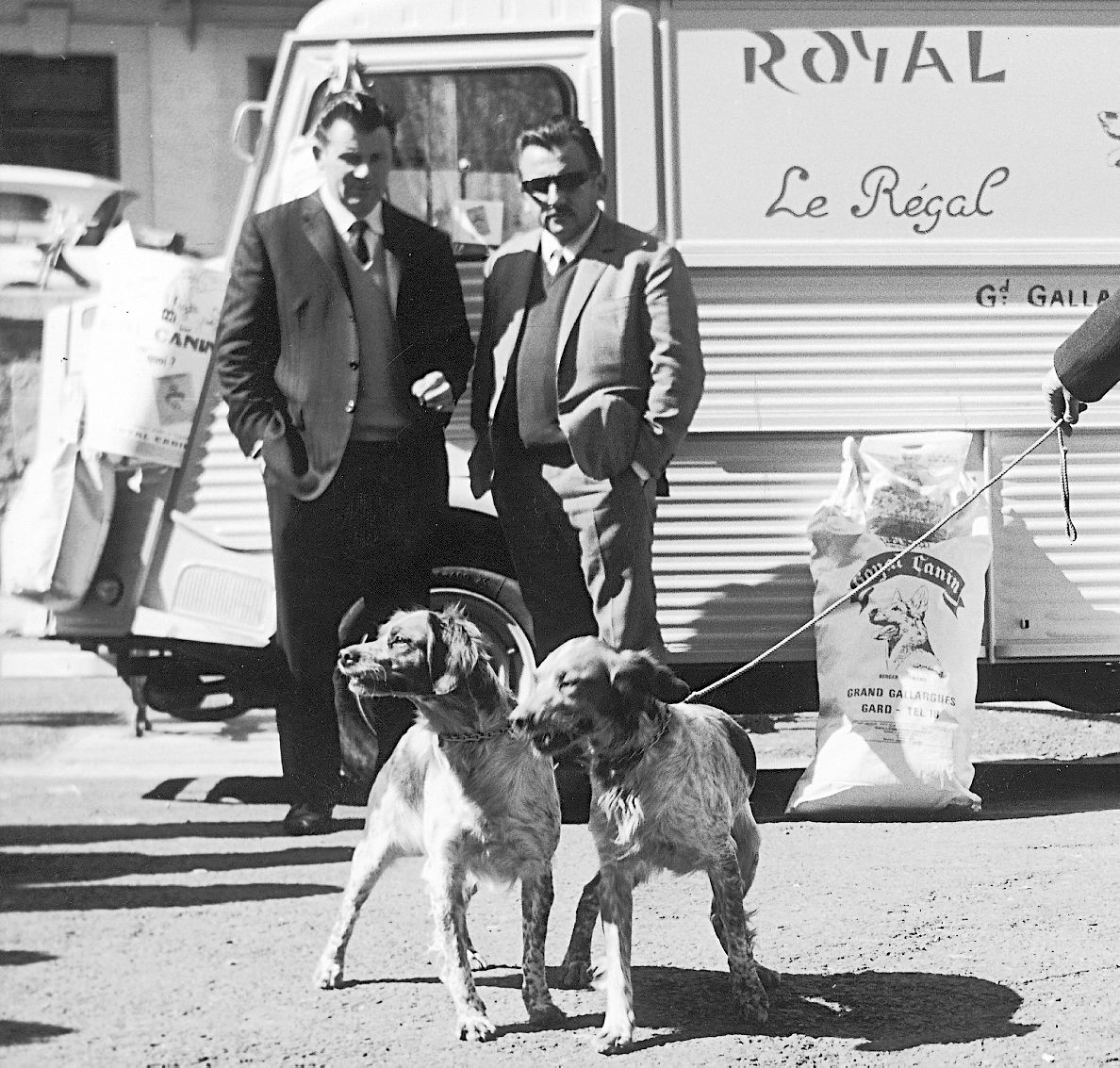
Jean Cathary (left), veterinarian and founder of Royal Canin, pictured in 1967.

The company was established by the French veterinary surgeon Jean Cathary in 1968. He had a veterinary practice in a village in the Gard region of France and was concerned that many dogs were being presented with a variety of health problems, especially skin and coat conditions. Convinced the cause was dietary, Cathary devised a cereal-based recipe, which he prepared in his garage oven.

The diet successfully alleviated the health issues affecting dogs, so in 1968, Cathary registered the food under the trademark "Royal Canin". He closed his veterinary practice to concentrate on manufacturing and distributing the feed. An extruder was imported from the U.S., and Royal Canin then became the first manufacturer of dry pet food in France and the first European company to use an extruder. The target market was primarily breeders and German Shepherd clubs; television advertising was used to promote the product.

Production steadily increased, and in 1970 the company was incorporated as "Royal Canin S. A."; a larger factory was opened in Aimargues, and the company began distributing throughout Europe. Forty staff were employed in the annual production of 5,500 tons of feed. A subsidiary, Royal Canin Iberica, was established in Spain. In March 1972, Dr Cathary sold the company to the Guyomarc'h Group, a much larger, family-run business, founded by Jean Guyomarc’h in 1954, that specialized in livestock feed. (Note: Guyomarc'h changed its name to Evialis at the beginning of 2001.)

The new ownership allowed the company to continue expanding, especially in the area of research and development. A second factory was inaugurated in 1975 in Cambrai, France.

The period under the ownership of Guyomarc'h saw a marked expansion of the company, particularly in the area of research and development. A dedicated research center was opened in Saint-Nolff, Brittany, in 1973. Over the decade leading up to 1982, additional subsidiaries were established in other European countries. These included Italy, Sweden, Belgium, Spain, Germany, and Denmark. Another factory was built in northern France to service sales in northern European countries. From 1982 onwards, Royal Canin diversified its portfolio to include products such as canned food and birdseed and saw its production quadruple to 200,000 tons within ten years.

The Guyomarc'h Group was purchased by the Paribas Affaires Industrielles (PAI) in 1990. Royal Canin recorded a loss in 1993; the following year, the Guyomarc'h Group was divided into four separate businesses, one of which remained as Royal Canin. In 1994, a new CEO was appointed who focused on three pillars: dry food, health through nutrition, and dog-handling expertise. The group wanted to sell Royal Canin, but the company's chairman persuaded the group to list it on the Paris stock exchange instead, and the listing took place in 1997. Forty-three percent of the company was floated on the stock market, which raised the company's valuation to 4.5 billion francs. The additional revenue raised funded the purchase of Crown Pet Foods in 1999 and the James Wellbeloved brand in 2000.

In 1999, the Guyomarc'h site was reorganized, and Royal Canin's activities became independent from the site's other activities.

=== Recent history ===
Paribas sold its holding in the company to Mars, Inc. in July 2002 more than 1.5 billion euros. The majority of this payment, almost 93 percent, was for "goodwill". The European Commission agreed to the takeover by Mars only on the condition that Royal Canin sell some assets to Agrolimen, a Spanish company. Royal Canin was delisted from the stock exchange following its acquisition by Mars.

In 2002, Mars acquired a 40 percent stake in Royal Canin. The economic daily Les Échos described this acquisition as the marriage of a French SME that led the European market with a powerful global distribution network.

In March 2004, Royal Canin acquired the U.S. and Canadian veterinary-grade food brands IVD, Medi-Cal, and Techni-Cal from Del Monte Foods for $82.5 million.

Royal Canin was one of the many brands affected by the 2007 pet food recalls.

As of 30 April 2012, the FDA had reported no subsequent Class I, II, or III recalls by Royal Canin. That same year, Royal Canin established a logistics platform in Verdun, France.

In 2018, Royal Canin celebrated its 50th anniversary.

In 2021, Mars announced that it would invest 46 million euros in France, including 22 million euros for its French and global headquarters in Aimargues, France, where the historic plant, a pilot plant, and an R&D center are located.

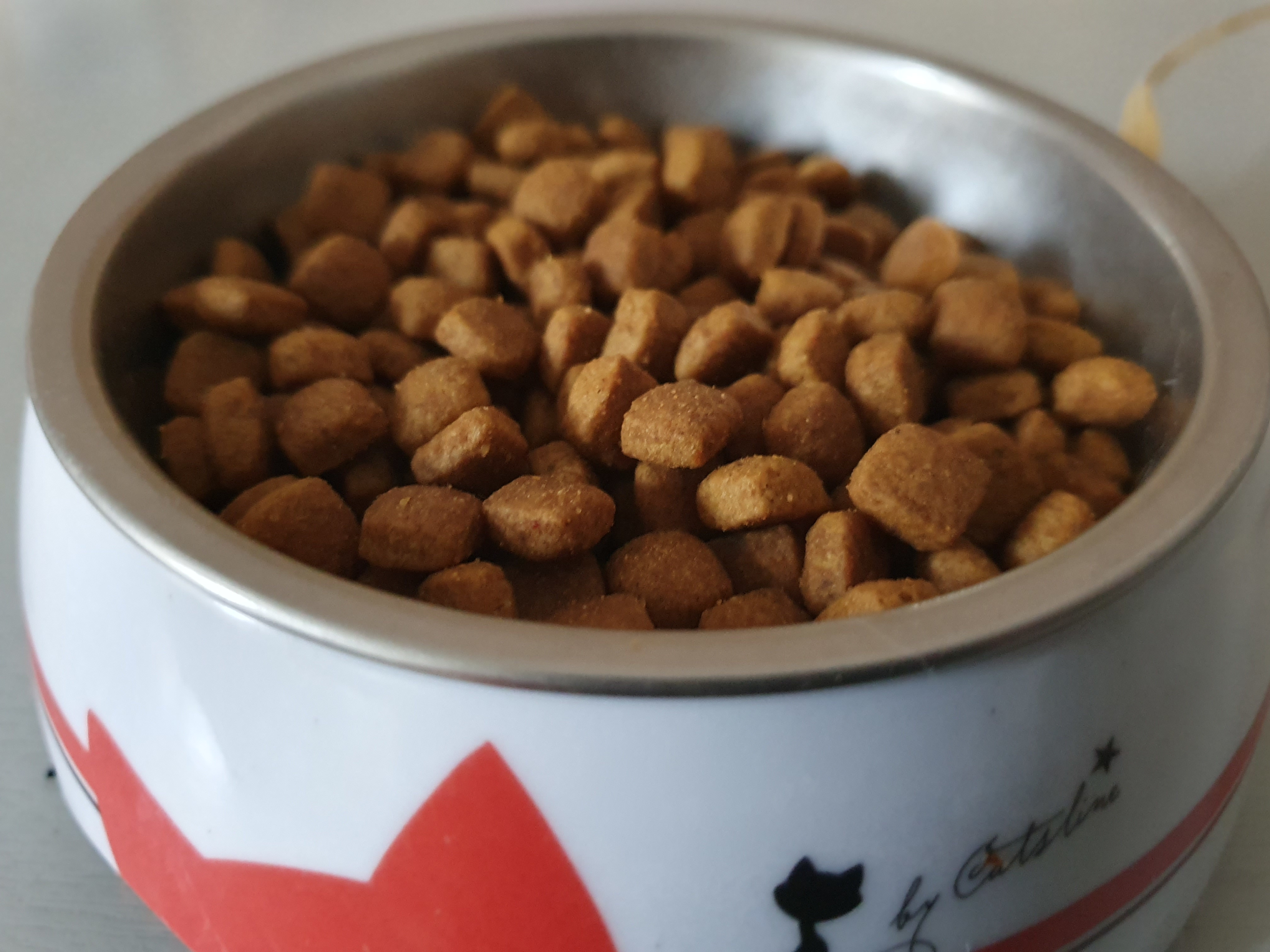
Gastrointestinal Hairball cat dry food (Royal Canin)

== Products and services ==
Royal Canin has about 450 different formulas. These are tailored to each animal's physiology and sensitivities and are designed to meet the specific needs of cats and dogs.

Royal Canin’s guiding principle is "health through nutrition".

=== Food ===
In the UK, Royal Canin is a member of the Pet Food Manufacturers Association (PFMA).

The products are adapted for different digestive capacity and divergent growth periods.

Royal Canin food products are divided in 3 main categories :

- Foods aimed at cats and dogs professionals: breeders, shelters, working dogs...
- Foods dedicated to the specialized store market: pet stores, garden centers, agricultural self-service stores
- Foods dedicated to veterinary clinics

=== Veterinary food ===
Royal Canin offers food designed for dogs and cats with specific needs, including urinary health, digestive health, allergies, dental health, and weight management .

In 2023, Royal Canin expanded its line of hypoallergenic food and launched Dental Care products, kibble with a texture designed to help clean teeth.

=== Veterinary products ===
Some veterinary foods are available through prescription only.

Pill Assist is a treat designed to help owners to give medication to their cats by masking tablets and capsules.

=== Publications ===
In collaboration with experts, Royal Canin led the development of publications such as the Dog's Encyclopedia, the Encyclopedia of Canine Clinical Nutrition, the Royal Canin Cat Encyclopedia, and other books like Nutrition of the pets with support of the French Veterinary Universities.

== Research and development ==
Royal Canin bases the production of its feeds on scientific research and observation. The company set up its first research center in Saint-Nolff in 1973; a subsequent research center was established in Missouri in the late 1980s, and a research facility was also opened in Brazil. Royal Canin has two pet centers: one in Aimargues and one in Lewisburg. Products are tested non-invasively on a "focus group" of about 500 pets (dogs and cats) selected for the characteristics of their breeds. Daniel Cloche was one of the scientists who first worked at the company's French research facility and was described as "one of the pioneers in researching bone-related disorders and diseases among dogs". Research indicated that bone problems in large dogs could be dietary, so specific recipes were developed to address them. In 1980, Royal Canin launched a new product called AGR, designed specifically for large-breed puppies. Around that time, the company also began producing cat foods to suit specific dietary requirements.

Henri Lagarde was chairman of the company during the 1990s and drove the implementation of three core policies. First, the physiology and biology of pets were to be studied to increase the company's knowledge base. Second, all products had to address specific needs; this was further reinforced by a mandatory instruction to the research and development department that "no veterinarian or university should be able to refute any of Royal Canin's nutritional arguments". Finally, animals and their nutritional needs were to be approached with "knowledge and respect" rather than being humanized.

=== Veterinary and peer-reviewed journals ===
With the help of academics, the company also produces encyclopedias on dog and cat breeds, which have been translated into 15 languages. There are also books on breeding, nutrition and publications aimed at breeders and veterinarians. Royal Canin also published the scientific quarterly titled FOCUS magazine which was circulated to over seventy thousand veterinarians worldwide in eleven different languages. FOCUS is now called Veterinary Focus magazine and the publishing has been led by Royal Canin since 2003. This is in addition to the 1,450 veterinary publications produced for the Waltham Petcare Science Institute.

== Sponsorships and partnership ==
The company sponsors and participates in thousands of cat and dog shows each year around the world, like local and regional Canine Club.

In 2013, Four Paws, an international animal welfare group, accused Royal Canin of sponsoring events that included illegal bear-baiting in Ukraine. The company confirmed the allegations and promised to take action to put an end to its sponsorship of such events.

== Factories and logistics ==
Royal Canin's head office is in Aimargues, southern France. There are 16 production facilities worldwide, notably in Aimargues; Cambrai in northern France and Descalvado, Brazil.

In 2004, production facilities at Dmitrov, near Moscow, Russia, opened. Royal Canin committed twelve million euros to the construction of the factory and anticipated annual production of twenty–two thousand tons a year.

The Polish government announced construction was to start in February 2006 on a fifty million euro factory in Niepołomice, Poland, which would provide employment for more than 150 people. At the time of the announcement, it was described as "the ninth and most modern of the company's facilities".

In 2008, the company invested seventy–three million dollars in the construction of a factory at Guelph, Ontario, Canada.

A factory at North Sioux City, South Dakota, USA, was originally purchased by Mars in 2007 and worked under the Mars Petcare brand. This was then rebranded to Royal Canin in 2011, where it manufactures wet pet food.

Royal Canin's twelfth production facility was fully built at the end of 2009 and is located in Shanghai, China.

A new plant was opened in 2018 in South Korea in Gimje, North Jeolla Province.

In 2021, the company announced it would invest $185 million in its facility in North Sioux City in South Dakota. In the same year Royal Canin announced an investment of $200 million to expand its manufacturing facility in Lebanon, Tennessee. The expansion began in 2019.

== Corporate information ==
=== Governance ===
Since July 2022, Cécile Coutens has been the new president. She succeeds Loïc Moutault. She is the first woman at the head of Royal Canin.

==== List of chief executive officers ====
- 1972-1994: René Gillain
- 1994-2004: Henri Lagarde
- 2004-2007: Alain Guillemin
- 2007-2014: Jean-Christophe Flatin
- 2014-2022: Loïc Moutault
- 2022–present: Cécile Coutens

=== Events ===
Royal Canin organizes events related to pets and the pet industry, such as the Vet Symposium, aimed at veterinarians and veterinary nurses from around the world, and the PRO Experts Forum, aimed at breeders.

In December 2023, Royal Canin launched its international photography competition, the Royal Canin Photography Award (RCPA). The competition aims to celebrate cats and dogs and raise awareness of their uniqueness and diversity through art.

=== Royal Canin Foundation ===
The Royal Canin Foundation is a non-profit entity created in 2020. The Foundation was launched to fund projects that demonstrate the beneficial role of companion animals in human health, such as disease detection and support for individuals with autism. In 2021, the foundation notably supported a program for canine-assisted COVID-19 detection and the innovative K-Dog project for early breast cancer screening.

== Controversies ==
In 2013, following a controversy sparked by the support of dog and bear fights by its Ukrainian subsidiary, the company announced its commitment to assisting in the protection of bears in Ukraine.

In 2017, the brand was mentioned in a report by France 5, "What Kind of Kibble for Our Pets?" and in the book "Ce Poison Nommé Croquette" by Jérémy Anso, criticizing the quality of products from Hill's Pet Nutrition and Royal Canin, among others.

== See also ==
- 2007 pet food recalls
