= Casas GEO =

Mexican housing developer

Casas GEO, S.A.B de C.V.
- Company type: Sociedad Anónima Bursátil de Capital Variable
- Traded as: BMV: GEO; BMAD: XGEO
- Industry: Construction
- Founded: 1990
- Headquarters: Mexico City, Mexico
- Key people: Luis Orvañanos Lascurain, (Chairman & CEO)
- Revenue: ▼US$ 1.4 billion (2012)
- Net income: ▼US$ 80.8 million (2012)
- Number of employees: 23,724
- Website: www.corporaciongeo.com www.casasgeo.com.mx

Casas GEO (BMV: GEOB / BM: XGEO) was a leading housing developer in Mexico and one of the largest in Latin America. The company was engaged in all aspects of design, development, construction, marketing, sales and delivery of mainly low-income housing developments in Mexico. With operations in 52 cities across 16 states, GEO was one of the most geographically diversified homebuilders in Mexico.

Since its inception, the company had sold more than 510,000 homes which currently provide housing to 2 million persons. Geo's business model focused mainly in the affordable entry level and economic segments.

In 2005, GEO entered the European market through the Latibex index, being the first housing company in Mexico to achieve this.

Reuters reported an announcement made by GEO to the Mexican stock exchange in 2019, that a court in Mexico City declared the company in a state of bankruptcy with effect from March 8 due to a failure to make its payments.
