= BME Growth =

- Type: Stock Exchange
- Location: Madrid, Spain
- Founded: 2008
- Owner: Bolsas y Mercados Españoles
- Key people: Antonio Giralt, chairman
- Currency: EUR
- No. of listings: 8

The BME Growth is a sub-market of Bolsas y Mercados Españoles (BME), the Spanish company that deals with the organizational aspects of the Spanish stock exchanges and financial markets, which includes the stock exchanges in Madrid, Barcelona, Bilbao and Valencia.

MAB, created in 2008, is akin to London's AIM, Frankfurt's Neuer Markt or Paris' Nouveau marché, and allows smaller companies to float shares with a more flexible regulatory system than is applicable to the main market.

To join the MAB, companies must have fully paid-up capital, audited accounts and list through an initial public offering with a minimum free float of €2m.

The first listing on MAB, Zinkia, took place in July 2009 and managed to raise €7m.

== See also ==
- Bolsas y Mercados Españoles
- Alternative Investment Market
- BME Scaleup
