= Sacyr =

Spanish infrastructure operator and developer company

SACYR S.A.

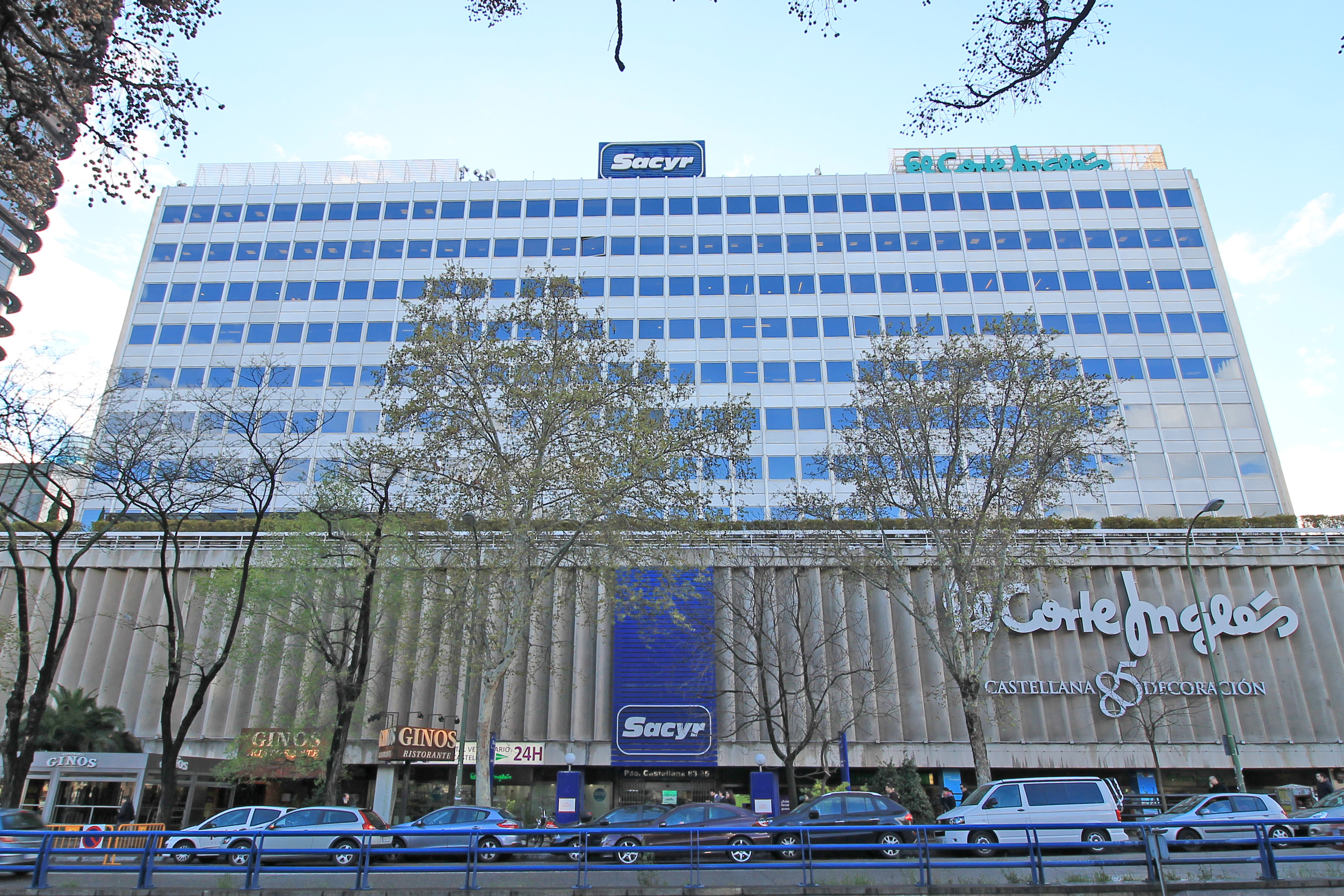
- Headquarters in Madrid, Spain
- Company type: Sociedad Anónima
- Traded as: BMAD: SYV
- ISIN: ES0182870214
- Industry: Construction, Investment
- Founded: 1986
- Headquarters: Madrid, Spain
- Key people: Manuel Manrique Cecilia (Chairman and CEO)
- Revenue: ▲€4.548 billion (2020)
- Operating income: ▲€467 million (2020)
- Net income: ▲€236 million (2020)
- Number of employees: 15,529 (2024)
- Website: www.sacyr.com

SACYR S.A. (Spanish pronunciation: [saˈθiɾ]) is a Spanish infrastructure operator and developer company based in Madrid.

== History ==
The company was founded in 1986 as Sociedad Anónima Caminos y Regadíos and was renamed Sacyr in 1991. The company received their first concession in 1996, which was the Chilean El Elquí highway. From this moment on, it began its expansion by adding concessions in Chile and Spain and making purchases such as that of Avasa, the highway between Bilbao and Zaragoza.

In 2002, it acquired 24.5% of Vallehermoso, a leading Spanish housing business founded in 1921. In 2003, it merged with Vallehermoso to form Sacyr Vallehermoso.

In June 2006, Isolux Corsán presented a takeover bid for Europistas at a price of 4.8 euros per share, which meant valuing the company at 646 million euros.

On December 1, 2008, an agreement between the Citigroup fund and Sacyr was announced, whereby Sacyr disposed of its subsidiary for €7,887 million, €2,874 million in cash plus €5,013 million in net debt that would be assumed by the fund. The agreement did not include concessions under development and concessions in operation that were not highways. In addition, the group would later acquire from Citigroup a series of toll roads worth €478.3 million and a series of concession activities in the launch and construction phase for a total amount of €450 million. Sacyr seeks to bring together all the concessions it holds in a new subsidiary, Sacyr Concesiones. Abertis also agreed with Citigroup to buy assets in Spain and Chile for a value of €621 million. Also, Atlantia would acquire stakes in toll roads in Portugal, Brazil and Chile for €420 million.

In July 2022, the company was fined €16.7 million, along with five other contractors, by the Comisión Nacional de los Mercados y la Competencia (CNMC) for bidding collusion in public tenders for building and civil infrastructure works.

== Major projects ==
Major projects involving the business include the Torre Sacyr Vallehermoso, completed in 2008.
