= Faes Farma =

Spanish pharmaceutical company

- Type: Public
- Industry: Pharmaceuticals
- Founded: 29 July 1933
- Headquarters: Lamiaco, Lejona, Biscay, Spain
- Products: Human pharmaceuticals; animal nutrition & health (FARM Faes)
- Net income: 79,670,000 (2025)
- Number of employees: 1,766 (2022)
- Website: Official website

Faes Farma, originally Fábrica Española de Productos Químicos y Farmacéuticos (FAES), is a Spanish pharmaceutical company based in the Lamiaco district of Lejona in Biscay. Founded on 29 July 1933 by the Serra family with an initial capital of two million pesetas, it pioneered the development of various therapeutic compounds and has been listed on the Madrid Stock Exchange since the 1940s.

Faes Farma’s headquarters, production facilities, and R&D center are located in Lejona, with additional offices in Madrid and Barcelona. The group also operates subsidiaries in Portugal, Italy (51% stake), Mexico, Guatemala, Colombia, Chile, Peru, Bolivia, Ecuador and Nigeria, and maintains an animal nutrition and health division under the name FARM Faes.

== History ==
Since its foundation on 29 July 1933, Faes Farma—specializing in the pharmaceutical industry—has been one of the foremost chemical companies in Biscay. Its original 4,000 m² plant on the banks of the Ibaizábal River in Lamiaco produced bismuth salts, chlorides and yellow mercury oxide from minerals sourced in Córdoba, Spain and Almadén.

Early therapeutic efforts targeted endemic conditions such as syphilis, recurrent fevers and Malta fever. Its flagship product was NEO‑FAES (neoarsenobenzol), selling 300 000 units in its first year. During the post‑Civil War autarky period, FAES was Spain’s sole producer of arsenobenzoles and other antiluetic arsenicals—early antibiotic agents—marketing SULFO‑FAES, CALCIO‑FAES and URO‑FAES.

In the 1940s the company added sulfopyridine, sulfathiazole and arsenoxide to its portfolio, and began processing saccharin and barium salts for radiology. During the 1950s–60s it produced herbicides and pesticides such as camphor‑chloride, polychlorocamphene and dinitronaphthalene, but from the 1970s refocused on pharmaceuticals—manufacturing 73 different medicines across therapeutic areas—and in 1978 synthesized hydrosmin (marketed as Verosmil).

International alliances began in the 1990s. In 2007 Faes Farma diversified into animal nutrition and health with the purchase of Ingaso, followed in 2017 by acquisitions of Initial Technical Foods and Tecnovit.

In June 2025 Faes Farma reinforced its ophthalmology portfolio by acquiring Portuguese specialist Edol for €75 M and Italian ophthalmic company SIFI for €270 M—the largest acquisition in its history—raising ophthalmology to nearly 20% of group revenues.

== Facilities ==
The original 1935 production and office buildings were designed by Enrique Belda and later expanded in the 1950s–70s by Rafael Fontán, Pedro Ispizua Susunaga (with Belda), Gregorio Viteli and Francisco Javier Ispizua Uribarri. The complex is arranged in pavilions around internal plazas, with reinforced concrete structures and brick façades featuring classical decorative elements.

=== Derio Plant ===
In mid‑2024 Faes Farma completed a new 60 000 m² factory at the Bizkaia Science and Technology Park, built for €200 M to double—and potentially triple—production capacity. Since January 2025 it has EU authorization as a pharmaceutical laboratory and production center, with gradual transfer from Lamiaco scheduled through 2027 to reach 100 million units per year. The plant features one‑third production area and two‑thirds logistics—including a robotic warehouse—and was designed with abundant natural light to enhance the work environment.
