= Cuatrecasas =

Cuatrecasas is a surname. Notable people with the surname include:

- José Cuatrecasas (1903–1996), Spanish botanist
- Pedro Cuatrecasas (1936–2025), American biochemist
