= Ence (company) =

Ence Energía y Celulosa, S.A.

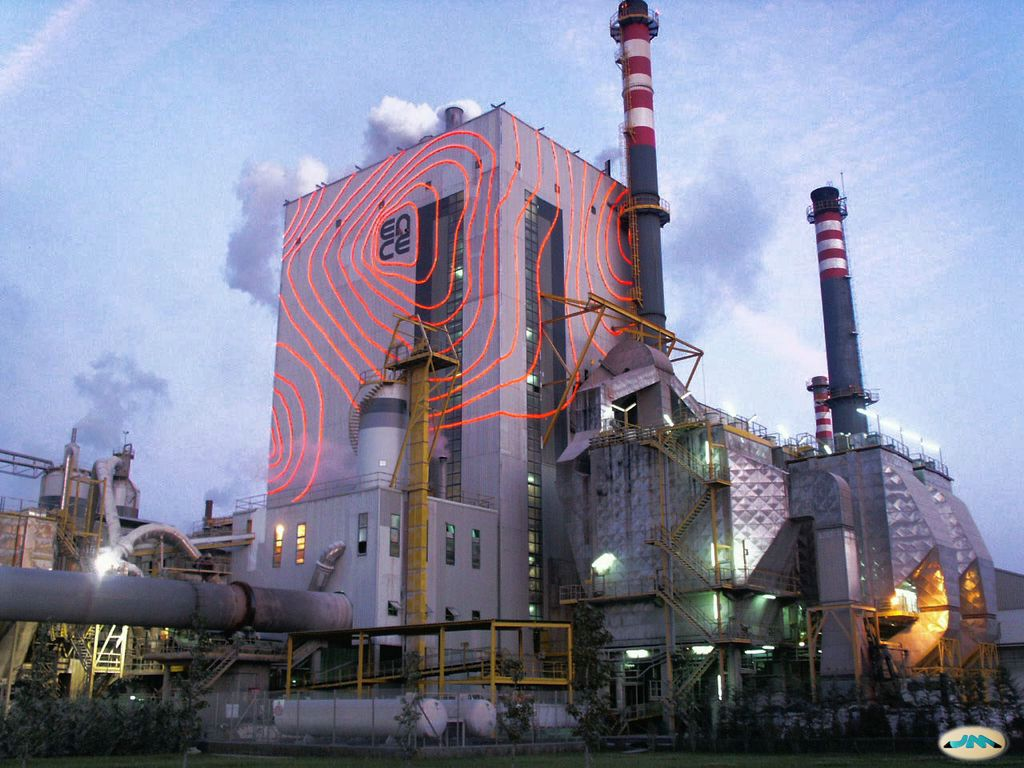
- An Ence power plant in Pontevedra, Spain
- Company type: Sociedad Anónima
- Traded as: BMAD: ENCE
- ISIN: ES0130625512
- Industry: Services, pulp and energy, paper and automation
- Founded: 1957
- Headquarters: Madrid, Spain
- Key people: Ignacio de Colmenares, 10th Count of Polentinos (chairman and CEO)
- Revenue: ▲€831.982 million (2018)
- Operating income: ▲€209.566 million (2018)
- Net income: ▲€129.130 million (2018)
- Total assets: ▲€1.724 billion (2018)
- Number of employees: ▲1,048 (2018)
- Website: www.ence.es

Ence Energía y Celulosa, S.A. simply known as Ence (Spanish pronunciation: [ˈenθe]), is a Spanish multinational company that develops and supplies technologies, automation systems and services for the pulp, paper and energy industries.

The production of paper pulp (pulp from cellulose) at its factories in Pontevedra and Navia makes it the European leader in the manufacture of eucalyptus cellulose. Ence is also the leading Spanish company in the production of renewable energy with biomass agroforestry. It generates energy from its plants in Huelva, Mérida, Ciudad Real, Jaén and Lucena. In addition, until November 2020 it also produced solar thermal energy through its 50 megawatt Termollano plant, located in the town of Puertollano, which was subsequently sold. Ence is also the main private forest manager in Spain.

Between 1950 and its listing on the Madrid Stock Exchange in 1990, it was a publicly owned company linked to the former Instituto Nacional de Industria (INI). It was formerly called the "Compañía Nacional de Celulosa". It changed its name to Grupo Ence after its initial public offering in 1990. Firstly, 49% was privatized, and in 2001 the remaining 51%. It was part of IBEX 35 twice: between January 1995 and January 1997, and between December 2018 and September 2020.

The headquarters of the company are located in Madrid. Altogether, Ence's pulp production in 2019 was 1,200,000 tons of pulp, of which most of it was exported to countries in Northern Europe. The company also generated 1,908 Gigawatt hours of electricity, resulting from the combustion of biomass, not fossil fuels.

== See also ==
- Paper industry
