= Logista =

Spanish company

Compañía de Distribución Integral Logista Holdings, S.A.
- Company type: Sociedad Anónima (Subsidiary); BMAD: LOG
- Industry: Distribution of products and services, Wholesale
- Founded: 1999
- Headquarters: Leganés, Spain
- Number of locations: >400 warehouses
- Area served: Southern Europe
- Key people: Luis Alfonso Egido Gálvez (CEO)
- Revenue: € 9.47 billion (2015)
- Number of employees: >6,000 (2015)
- Parent: Imperial Brands (50.2%)
- Subsidiaries: Logista España; Logista France; Logista Italia; Logista Portugal; Logista Polska; Integra2; Logesta; Logistadis; Logista Libros; Logista Pharma; Logista Publicaciones; MidSid; Nacex; SAF; Supergroup; Terzia
- Website: www.logista.com

Compañía de Distribución Integral Logista Holdings, S.A., or Grupo Logista is a Spanish company, through its subsidiaries, operates as a distributor of products and services to proximity retailers in Southern Europe. The company distribution includes different product categories such as tobacco, convenience, pharmaceutical, books and periodicals, as well as e-transactions among others. Logista also provides long distance and full load transport services, temperature-controlled transportation services, industrial parcel and parcel and express courier services.

The group serves approximately 300,000 delivery points in Spain, France, Italy, Portugal and Poland, as well as approximately 45,000 point of sale terminals. It supplies clients in various sectors comprising tobacco, publishing, books, e-transactions, health, HORECA, wholesale distribution, and public sectors.

== History ==
Logista's origins go back to Tabacalera's (then Altadis) distribution division, from which it spun off in 1999.

In 2008 Imperial Tobacco Group (now Imperial Brands) acquired Grupo Logista, maintaining independent management of the company.

In 2014 the Compañía de Distribución Integral Logista Holdings, S.A.U (Grupo Logista), parent company of the Compañía de Distribución Integral Logista S.A.U Operating Company (former Group's parent company) was created. Logista began trading on Spanish stock exchanges on July 14, 2014, at a price of €13 per share and is part of the IBEX Medium Cap®.

== Companies of the Group ==
The company operates in Europe through numerous group entities, such as Logista, Integra2, Logesta, Logistadis, MidSid, Nacex, Supergroup and Terzia among others.

== Infrastructure ==
Logista European infrastructure network comprises some 400 warehouses, including 42 central/regional warehouses and 363 service points, surpassing 1 million m^{2} of warehousing.
