= Nouveau marché =

The Nouveau marché
- Type: Equity market
- Location: Paris, France
- Founded: 1996
- Owner: Paris Bourse now Euronext Paris

The Nouveau marché (New Market) was a French equity market that was a division of the Paris Bourse, now called Euronext Paris.

== History ==
The Nouveau marché was founded in 1996 to facilitate access to the financial market by new start-ups with high growth potential but insufficient financing. Only newly formed companies were allowed access to the Nouveau marché, which was envisioned as a French equivalent to NASDAQ in the United States.

Created simultaneously with the Nouveau marché was a German counterpart, Neuer Market, and a British counterpart, the Alternative Investment Market.

To be allowed on the Nouveau marché, companies needed a minimum of 1.5 million euros in capital, among other requirements.

Most of the companies listed on the Nouveau marché companies were in the technology sector.

A November 2000 article in the Wall Street Journal stated that the Nouveau marché was “headed into hibernation.” During the first half of the year, there had been 40 initial public offerings, but during the rest of the year only eight IPOs had been added to the market. According to “market watchers,” wrote Mathilde Richter, “Nouveau Marche IPOs are going to become as rare as black truffles.” The problem, she explained, was a “glutted” IPO market and investors who had “tired of unprofitable Internet companies coming to market and disappointing at earnings season.” Richter quoted Francois Dubrule of the Paris-based venture-capital fund Angel Invest as saying that the market was “saturated.” In short, the “rosy days” of the Nouveau marché were apparently over.

On February 21, 2005, Euronext Paris created a single regulated market, Eurolist, to replace the Premier Marché, Second Marché, and Nouveau Marché.

== See also ==
- Paris Bourse
- Euronext Paris
