= Bolsas y Mercados Españoles =

Spanish stock exchange company

Bolsas y Mercados Españoles, Sociedad Holding de Mercados y Sistemas Financieros, S.A.
- Company type: Subsidiary
- Industry: Finance
- Founded: 1831; 195 years ago
- Headquarters: Madrid, Spain
- Key people: Juan Ramón Flames Omarrementaría (CEO)
- Services: Equity trading platforms, derivatives and fixed income markets, clearing, market data and technology
- Revenue: 311,966,000 euro (2024)
- Number of employees: ▲1033 (2024)
- Parent: SIX Group
- Website: www.bolsasymercados.es

Bolsas y Mercados Españoles (Spanish pronunciation: [ˈbolsas i meɾˈkaðos espaˈɲoles]; BME or BME Group) is the Spanish company that deals with the organizational aspects of the Spanish stock exchanges and financial markets. It is owned by SIX Group.

== Overview ==
BME owns the stocks exchanges of Madrid, Barcelona, Valencia and Bilbao as well as Latibex, an international market for Latin American securities, and the company Openfinance, a provider of technology in the wealth management industry. In addition, BME holds a participation in the Cámara de Riesgo Central de Contraparte of Colombia and the Mexican Stock Exchange.

BME also owns and operates BME Clearing, a central counterparty clearing house, and Iberclear, a central securities depository. Iberclear was formed in 2003 by merger of the Bank of Spain's book-entry system (known as CADE, for Central de Anotaciones de Deuda Pública) ant the stock exchange's Securities Clearing and Settlement Service (SCLV, for Sistema de Compensación y Liquidación de Valores).

BME has been a listed company since 14 July 2006 and an IBEX 35 constituent since July 2007 until December 2015. As of 2019, it was among the smallest of Europe's exchanges with a market capitalisation of 2.1 billion euros ($2.32 billion), less than half of Euronext's 5.2 billion euros.

In 2020, SIX Group, owner of the Swiss Stock Exchange, finalised the purchase of BME.

== See also ==
- BME Scaleup
- BME Growth
- Bolsa de Madrid
- List of stock exchanges
