= Comisión Nacional de los Mercados y la Competencia =

Spanish independent competition regulator

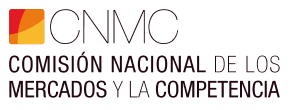

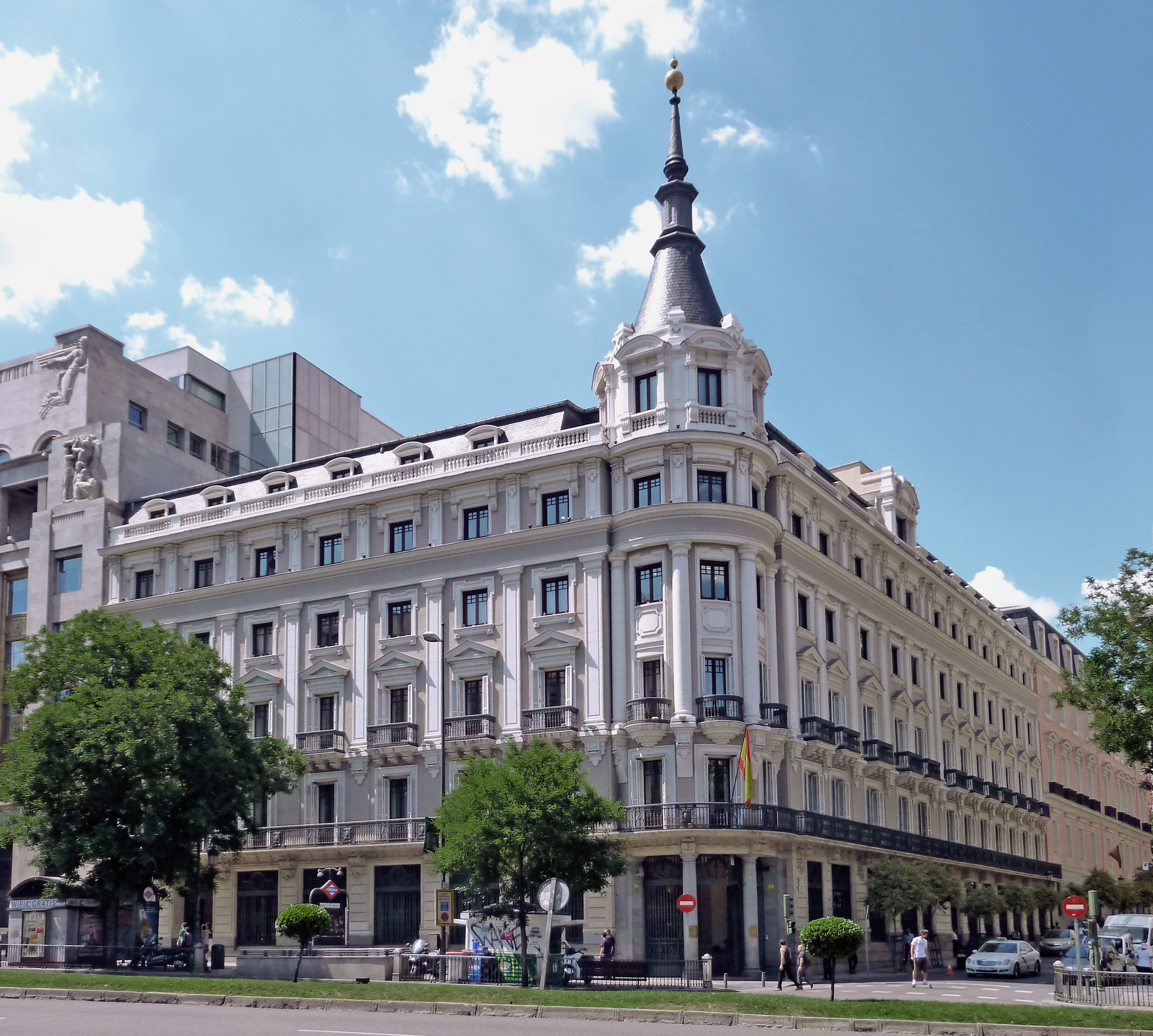
- CNMC Headquarters

Non-ministerial government department overview
- Formed: 2007
- Jurisdiction: Spain
- Annual budget: €3.7 billion, 2023
- Website: cnmc.es

The Comisión Nacional de los Mercados y la Competencia (English: National Commission on Markets and Competition), abbreviated as CNMC, is a Spanish independent competition regulator responsible for enforcing competition law. It was established by virtue of the Spanish Competition Act (Ley de Defensa de la Competencia or LDC, the competition defence act, of 3 July 2007). It was preceded by the Tribunal de Defensa de la Competencia (Competition Defense Court) until 1 September 2007. Since 2020 its president is Cani Fernández.

== Structure ==
President

- Luis Berenguer Fuster (until September 2011)
- Joaquín García Bernaldo de Quirós (2011- 2020)

Members of the Council

- Pilar Sánchez Núñez
- Julio Costas Comesaña
- Jesús González López
- Inmaculada Gutiérrez Carrizo
- Luis Díez Martín

Directors for Investigations

- Carlos Pascual (until September 2008)
- Clara Guzmán Zapater (2008-)

== Notable cases ==
In 2021, CNMC fined eight companies including Siemens, Nokia and ACS Group a combined 127.3 million euros ($148 million) for allegedly rigging public contracts valued at 4.1 billion euros for rail-signalling systems between 2002 and 2017.

In 2022, CNMC fined six leading construction firms – Dragados (part of ACS Group), Fomento de Construcciones y Contratas, Ferrovial, Acciona, Obrascón Huarte Lain, and Sacyr – a total of 204 million euros ($208 million) for colluding between 1992 and 2017 in submitting bids for public projects, such as roads and airports. Their collusion was considered socially damaging as they affected thousands of construction bids published by public authorities in Spain, leading to fewer and lower quality bids and putting competing companies at a disadvantage.

In response to the 2021–2022 global energy crisis, CNMC lowered the financial burden on around 300 smaller Spanish electricity traders and direct electricity consumers when depositing collateral payments in an attempt to help them stay afloat.

== See also ==
- Autorité de la concurrence (France)
- Bundeskartellamt (Germany)
- Competition and Markets Authority (United Kingdom)
- List of competition regulators
- List of telecommunications regulatory bodies
