= Evialis =

French animal feed company

Evialis (formerly Guyomarc'h NA) is a French industrial company specializing in animal feed.

== History ==
In 2000, Guyomarc'h NA took control of the animal health laboratory Franvet, and of UAR, a family-owned company specializing in equine nutrition, based in Essonne and held by the Huard family.

In 2001, Guyomarc'h NA changed its name and became Evialis. The same year, the company announced the acquisition of Agribrands' business in France.

In 2003, BNP Paribas appointed Alain Meulnart (former head of Générale Sucrière) as CEO of Evialis, replacing Alain Decrop.

In 2010, Evialis and the animal nutrition and health division of the In Vivo group merged.

In 2013, the Evialis group and the cooperatives Unicor and Qualisol merged their livestock feed manufacturing activities into a new entity called Solevial.
