= Pulev =

Pulev (Bulgarian: Пулев) is a Bulgarian male surname, its feminine counterpart is Puleva. Notable people with the surname include:

- Kubrat Pulev (born 1981), Bulgarian boxer
- Tervel Pulev (born 1983), Bulgarian boxer, brother of Kubrat
