= Bolsa de Madrid =

Stock exchange in Madrid, Spain

Coordinates: 40°25′01″N 3°41′31″W

Madrid Stock Exchange
- Bolsa de Madrid (Spanish)

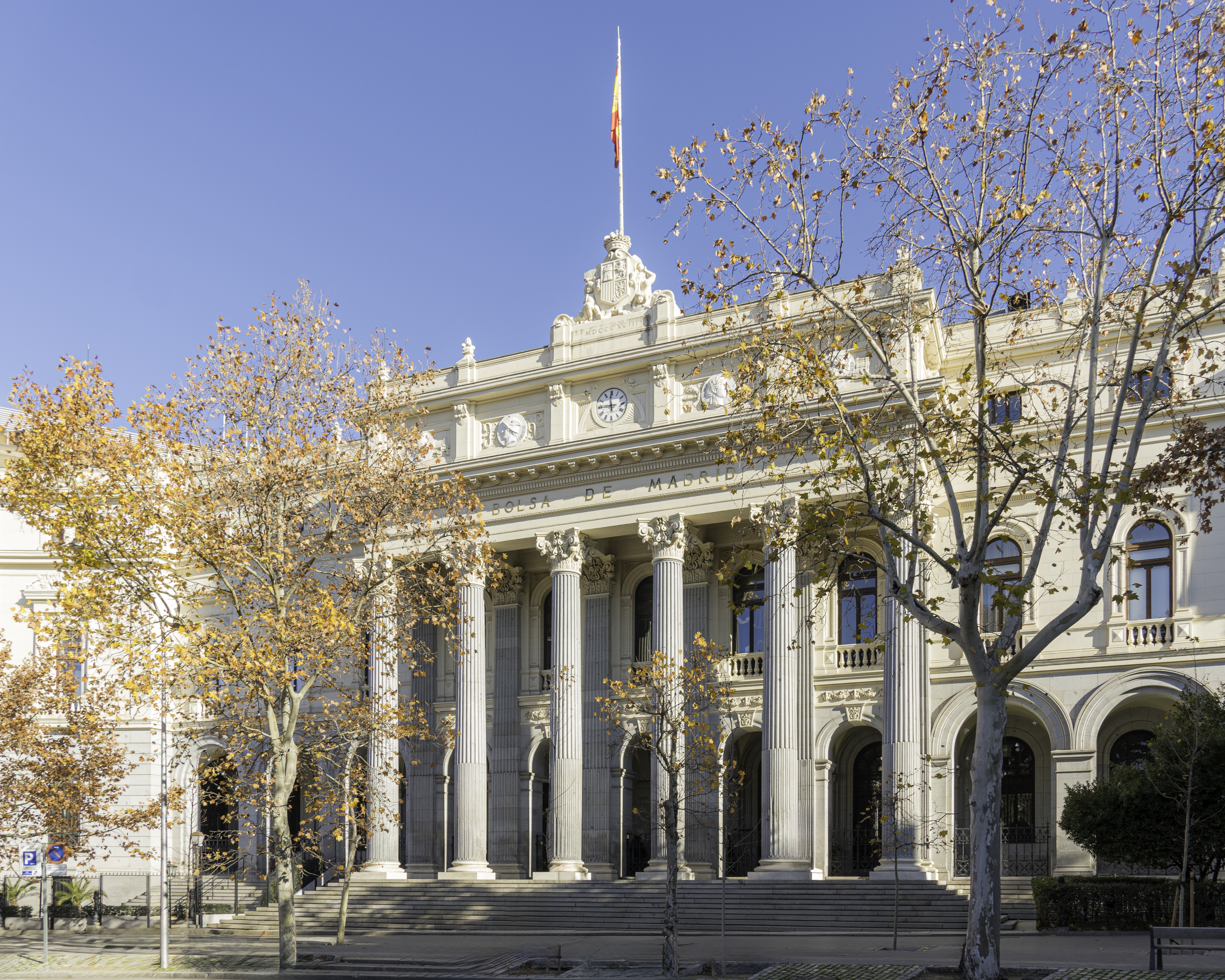
- Type: Stock exchange
- Location: Madrid, Spain
- Founded: 1831; 195 years ago
- Owner: Bolsas y Mercados Españoles
- Key people: David Jiménez-Blanco (Chairman)
- Currency: Euro
- Indices: IBEX 35; Latibex; IGBM
- Website: bolsamadrid.es

Bolsa de Madrid (Spanish pronunciation: [bolsa ðe ˈmaðɾið]; Madrid Stock Exchange) (Market Identifier Code: XMAD) is the largest and most international of Spain's four regional stock exchanges, the others being in Barcelona, Valencia, and Bilbao. It trade shares and convertible bonds and fixed income securities, including both government and private-sector debt. Bolsa de Madrid is owned by Bolsas y Mercados Españoles.

== Structure and operations ==
The reorganisation of Spain's financial market under the national umbrella of the Spanish Stock Market includes the bolsas, the derivatives markets, and fixed-income markets. Trading is linked through the electronic Spanish Stock Market Interconnection System (SIBE), which handles more than 90% of transactions; all fixed-income assets are traded through SIBE.

The Madrid Stock Exchange General Index (IGBM) is the exchange's principal index and represents the construction, financial services, communications, consumer, capital/intermediate goods, energy, and market services sectors. The IBEX 35 Index is a capitalization-weighted index comprising the 35 most liquid Spanish stocks traded in the continuous market, and is Bolsa de Madrid's benchmark. Bolsa de Madrid also offers the FTSE-Latibex Index, a European market for Latin American stocks. The Ibex New Market Index, for emerging companies, was offered from 2000 to 2007.

Settlement is T + 3. Trading on SIBE is conducted from 9 a.m. to 5:30 p.m.; open outcry from 10a.m. to 11:30 a.m., both Monday through Friday

== History ==
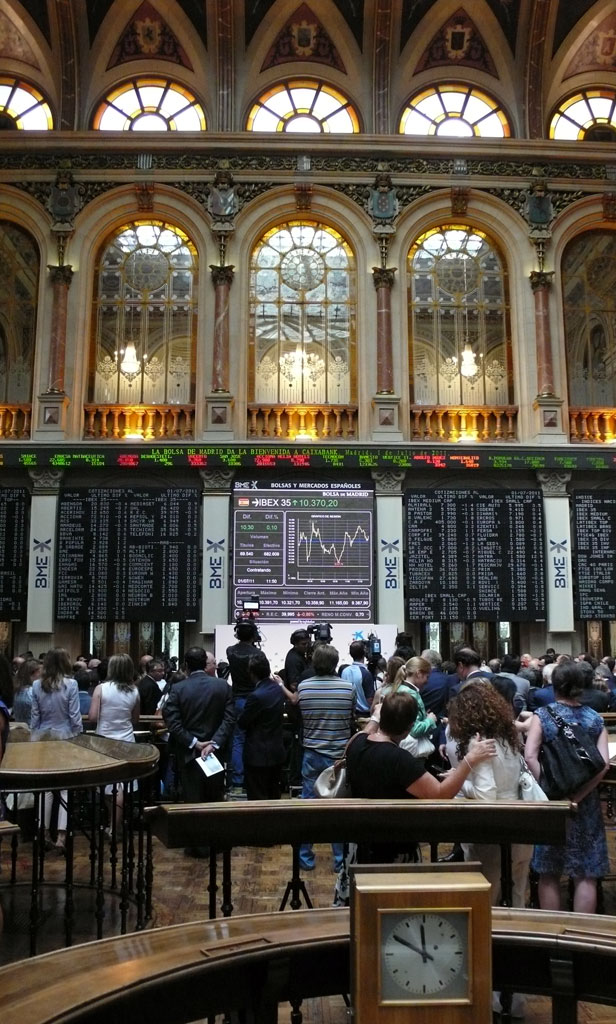
Interior of Madrid Stock Exchange

The Bolsa de Madrid was officially founded in 1831.

As required by Spanish law, it is managed and operated by the Sociedad Rectora de la Bolsa de Valores de Madrid S.A., a corporation organized under the laws of Spain. The membership of the Madrid Stock Exchange consists of 41 major financial institutions and 12 established securities dealers. At 31 December 2001, approximately 1,477 domestic and foreign companies had their equity securities listed on the Madrid Stock Exchange. The total market capitalization of the equity securities listed on the Madrid Stock Exchange in May, 2007 was €1,276.26 billion.

=== Building ===
The Bolsa continues to occupy its traditional home, a nineteenth-century building, the Palace of la Bolsa de Madrid. Despite the setting, the method of trading has changed. In 1993, the Bolsa de Madrid switched to all-electronic trading for fixed-income securities. There is also a base at Las Rozas.

== See also ==
- Madrid Stock Exchange General Index
