= National Hydrocarbons Institute =

Former Spanish state-owned company

- Native name: Instituto Nacional de Hidrocarburos
- Type: Public-law entity
- Industry: Oil and gas
- Founded: December 28, 1980
- Defunct: June 16, 1995
- Successor: Repsol
- Headquarters: Madrid, Spain
- Area served: Nationwide
- Key people: Claudio Boada, Chairman; Óscar Fanjul, Chairman
- Parent: Ministry of Industry and Energy

The National Hydrocarbons Institute (1980–1995, Spanish: Instituto Nacional de Hidrocarburos, INH) was a Spanish state-owned oil and gas company established through Law 45/1981, to manage the business-related activities of the petroleum industry in the country. However, privatization of the energy sector began in the late 1980s and INH was abolished in 1995.

== Related Spanish oil companies ==
- Compañía Arrendataria del Monopolio del Petróleo, S.A. (Campsa)
- Compañía Logística de Hidrocaburos, S.A (CLH), now Exolum
- Compañía Española de Petróleos, Sociedad Anónima (Cepsa), now Moeve
- Refinería de Petróleos de Escombreras S.A (REPESA)., now Repsol
  - Petróleos del Norte S.A. (Petronor)

== See also ==
- Ministry of Industry (Spain)
- Instituto Nacional de Industria
- SEPI
