= INH =

INH or inh may refer to:

- Ingush language, ISO 639 code
- Inhambane Airport, Mozambique, IATA code INH
- Isonicotinic acid hydrazide or isoniazid, an antibiotic for treatment of tuberculosis

== Historic uses ==
- Dutch East Indies, former FIFA country code INH
- Instituto Nacional de Hidrocarburos (INH, National Hydrocarbons Institute, 1980–1995), Spanish state-owned petroleum management company
