= Óscar Fanjul =

Spanish economist (born 1949)

Óscar Fanjul Martín

Personal details
- Born: 1949 (age 76–77) Santiago, Chile

Óscar Fanjul Martín (born 1949 in Santiago) is a Spanish economist.

== Biography ==
Fanjul was born in Santiago, Chile, in 1949. He started his professional career at the Instituto Nacional de Industria in 1972, and has also worked at the Confederación Española Cajas de Ahorros. He served during 1983 and 1984 as technical secretary general and undersecretary of the Ministry of Industry and Energy. He was the founder chairman and CEO of Repsol, S.A., from its creation in 1986 until 1996, and is currently honorary chairman of the company.

Fanjul is currently the vice chairman of Omega Capital, a private investment firm in Spain, as well as an international advisor to Goldman Sachs. He is also a director of Acerinox, Lafarge (vice chairman), Deoleo (chairman), and Marsh & McLennan Companies. He is a former director of Unilever, the London Stock Exchange and Areva. Fanjul is a trustee of the es:Fundación Amigos del Museo del Prado.

Fanjul holds a PhD in economics and is a professor at the Universidad Autónoma de Madrid. He is also a visiting professor at Harvard University and the Massachusetts Institute of Technology. He is a member of the Trilateral Commission and has been a member of the Competitiveness Advisory Group to the president of the European Commission. He is also member of IESE's international advisory board (IAB).

He subsequently held various positions of responsibility in companies such as Deoleo and Unilever. He is currently CEO of Omega Capital. He joined the Board of Directors of Ferrovial in July 2015.
