= Rafael de La-Hoz Castanys =

Spanish architect (born 1955)

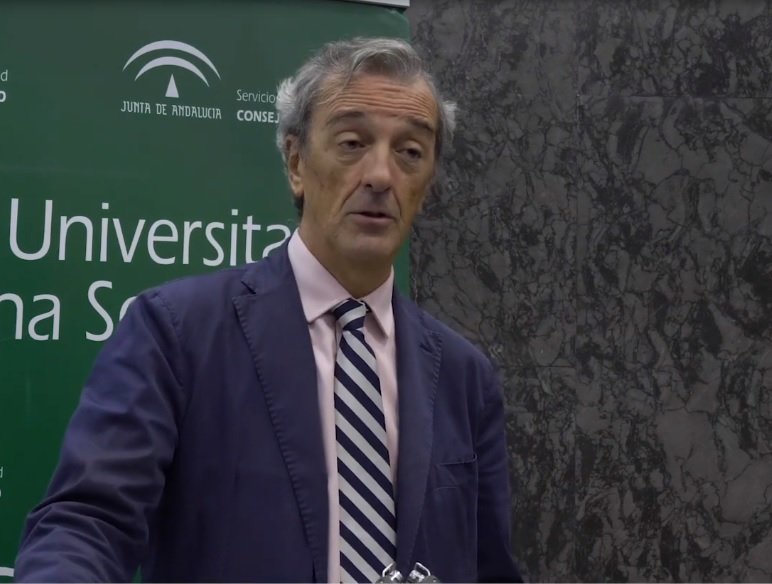
- Born: 1955; Córdoba
- Alma mater: Higher Technical School of Architecture of Madrid
- Awards: American Architecture Awards (Endesa Building, 2004)

Rafael de La-Hoz Castanys (born 1955) is a Spanish architect.

Son and grandson of architects (his father was Rafael de la Hoz Arderius), he was born in 1955 in Córdoba, where he was raised until he was 17 years old. He earned a degree in architecture from the Higher Technical School of Architecture of Madrid (ETSAM). In 2000, he became the director of the architecture firm founded by his grandfather back in 1920.

He is known as the author of many projects of corporative headquarters in Spain, including Repsol, Garrigues, BMW, Ferrovial, Uría y Menéndez, Endesa, Telefónica.

He is a visiting scholar at the Universidad Camilo José Cela and the Catalonia's International University.

== Projects ==
- Repsol Campus (Arganzuela, Madrid, Spain)
- Distrito Telefónica (Las Tablas, Madrid, Spain)
- Endesa's headquarters (Campo de las Naciones, Madrid, Spain)
- Torres de Hércules (Los Barrios, Spain)
- Hospital Universitario Rey Juan Carlos (Móstoles, Spain)
- Gran Vía 48 (Madrid, Spain)
- Junta de Distrito de Retiro (Madrid, Spain)
- Headquarters of the Higher Council of Chambers of Commerce (Madrid, Spain)
- Auditorio Rafael del Pino (Madrid, Spain)
- Mohammed VI Tower (Morocco)
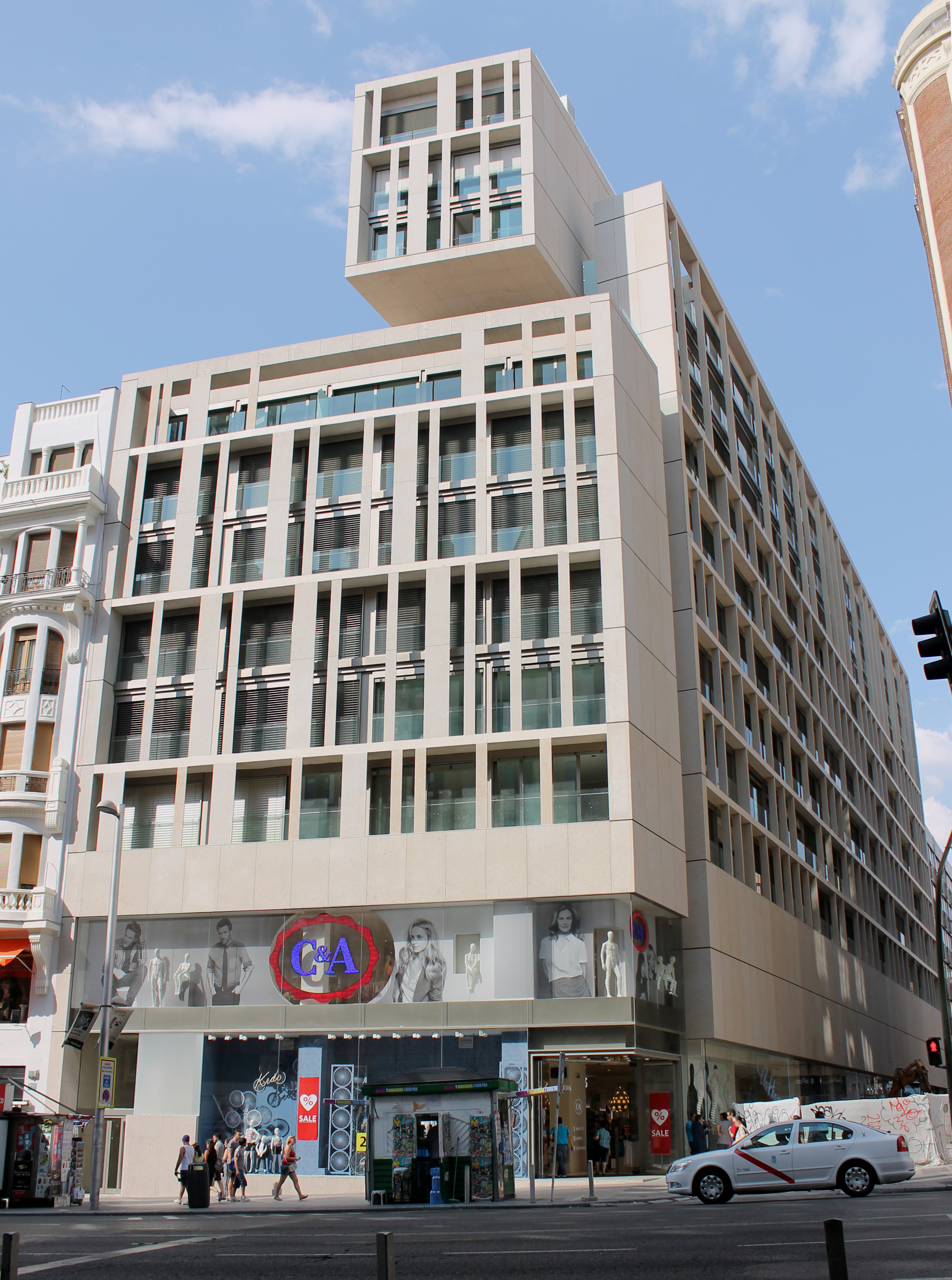
Gran Vía 48

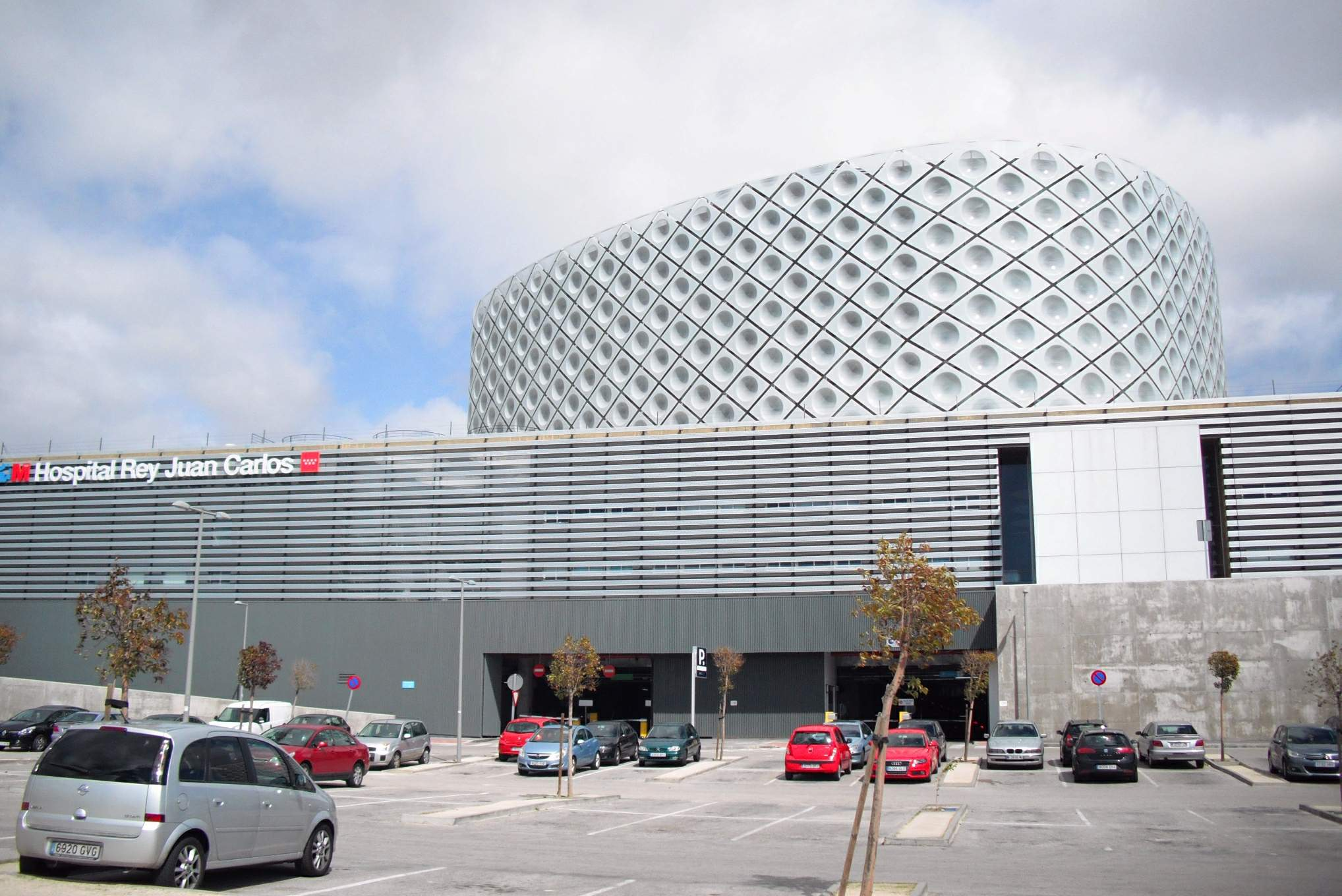
Hospital Universitario Rey Juan Carlos

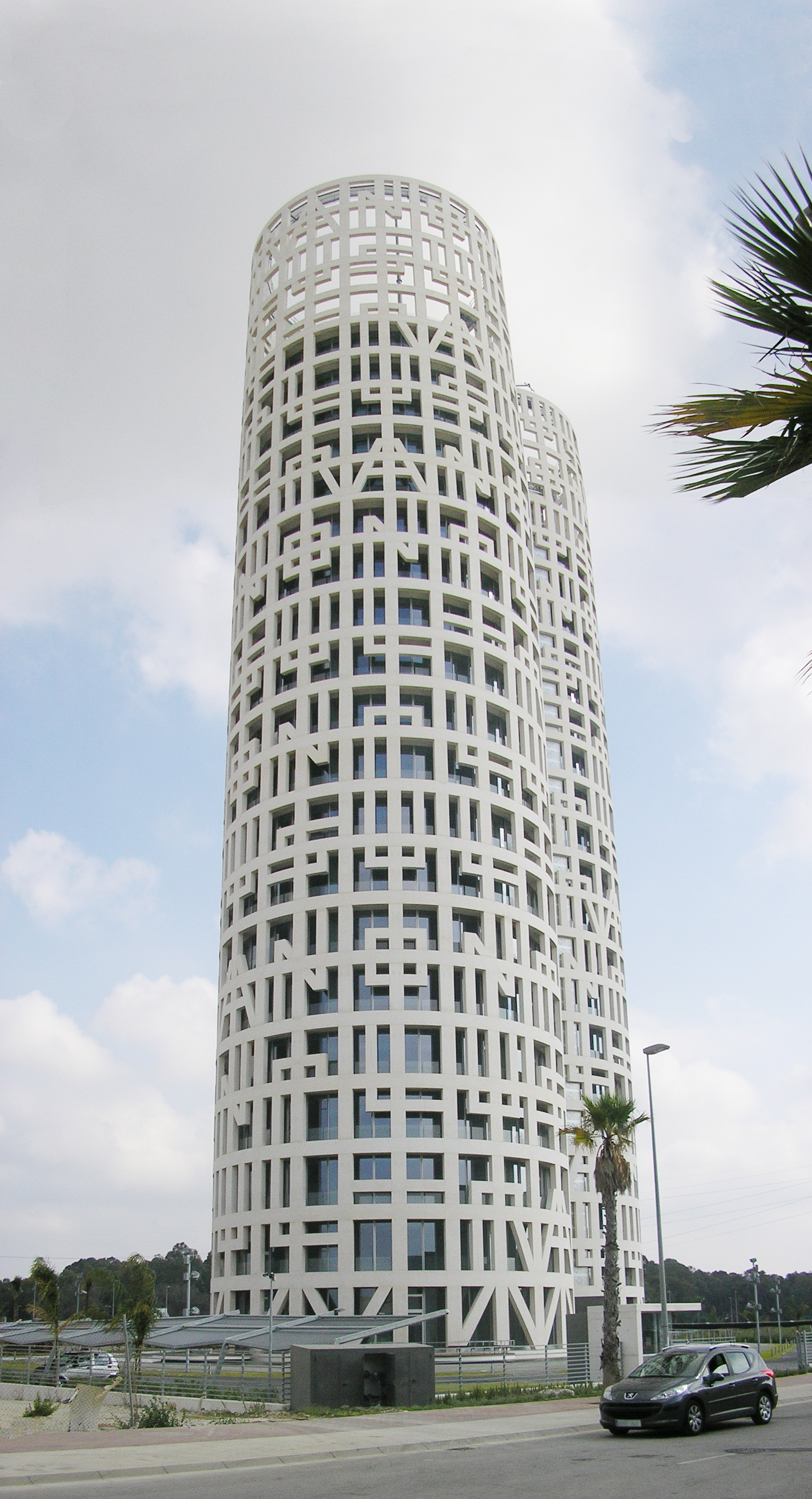
Torres de Hércules

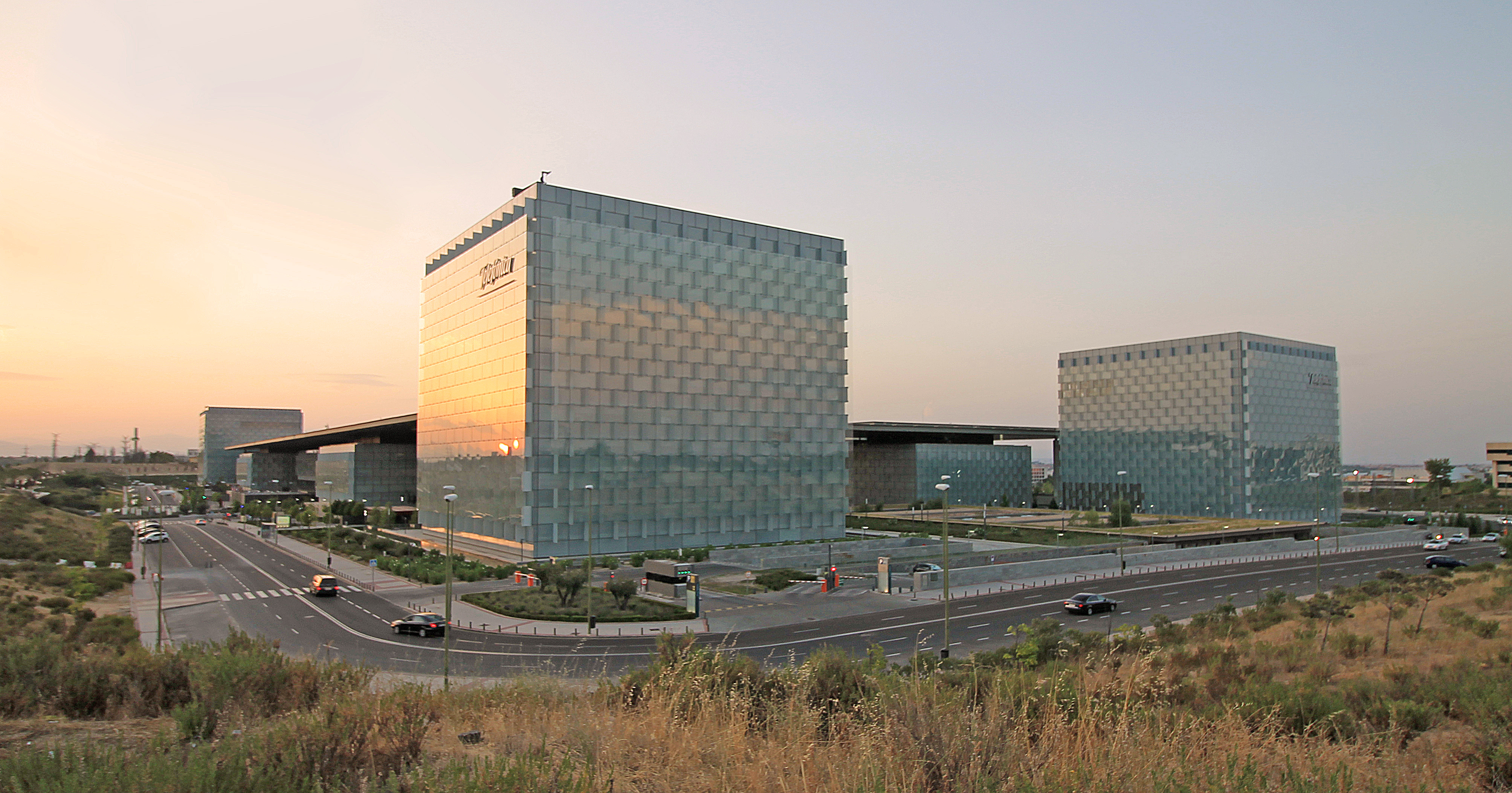
Distrito Telefónica

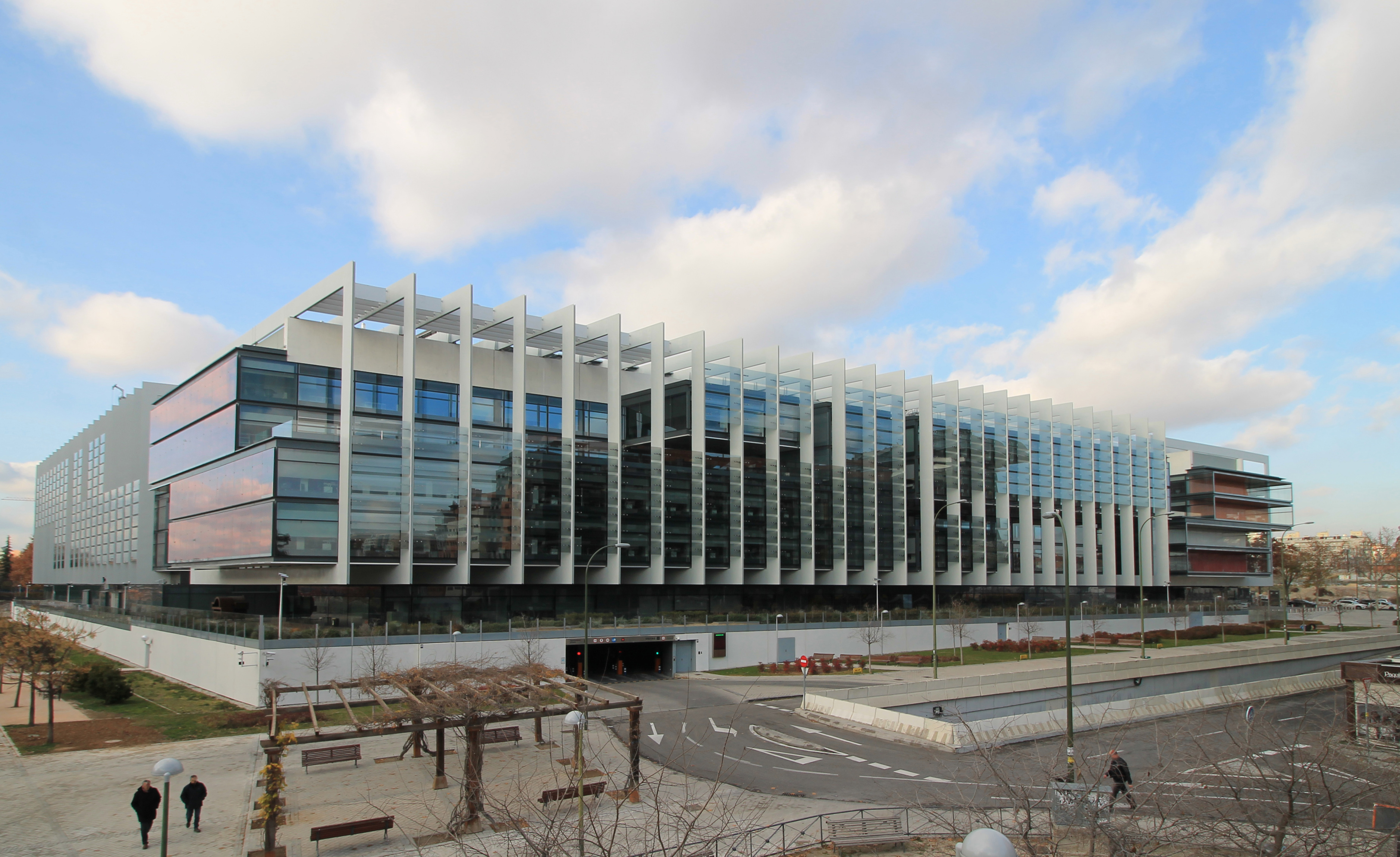
Repsol Campus
