= Instituto Nacional de Industria =

Spanish state-owned financing and industrial holding company

Logo of INI

Instituto Nacional de Industria (INI, National Institute of Industry) was a Spanish state-owned financing and industrial holding company established in Francoist Spain for the development of industry and social control. It was succeeded by the Sociedad Estatal de Participaciones Industriales (SEPI) in 1995.

== History ==
The INI was established on 25 September 1941 with a starting capital of fifty million pesetas. It aimed to promote the development of Spanish industry and the self-sufficiency of the Spanish economy. It aimed to overturn the effects of the devastation caused by the Spanish Civil War by carrying out in Spain functions similar to those of the Istituto per la Ricostruzione Industriale (IRI) in Italy.

Despite its inefficiencies, INI was instrumental in moving the mostly underdeveloped primary-sector-focused closed Spain of the 1940s to the booming Spain of the 1960s and early 1970s of the so-called Spanish miracle. To achieve its goal, INI either financed on its own or directed private funds to the creation of the country's fundamental industries under the spirit of the national interest and autarky. Although its first acts ended in failure (e.g., Adaro), INI soon turned itself into the biggest industrial conglomerate of Spain.

INI included a broad range of companies, from heavy and basic industries to "soft" services, most of them with E.N., standing for Empresa Nacional (National Corporation), in their names. Among them were: Ensidesa (Empresa Nacional Siderúrgica S.A.)–Aceralia (steel), Enasa (Empresa Nacional de Autocamiones S.A.)–Pegaso (trucks), SEAT (Sociedad Española de Automóviles de Turismo; cars), INH (Instituto Nacional de Hidrocarburos)–Repsol (Refinería de Petróleos de Escombreras Oil; oil and gas), ENCE (Empresa Nacional de Celulosas de España) (cellulose, biofuels), ENDASA (Empresa Nacional de Aluminio S.A.; aluminium), Endesa (Empresa Nacional de Electricidad S.A.; power), ENFERSA (Empresa Nacional de Fertilizantes S.A.; fertilizers), E.N. Calvo Sotelo (petrochemicals), E.N. Bazán–ASTANO (Astilleros y Talleres del Noroeste)–Navantia (naval shipyards), Astilleros Españoles–AESA (civilian shipyards), E.N. Santa Bárbara (weapons), E.N. Elcano (merchant shipping line), ATESA (Autotransporte Turístico Español S.A.; operator), ENTURSA (Empresa Nacional de Turismo S.A.; tourism) and others.

INI also assisted mergers and integration, including of private enterprises, like the airlines Iberia (Iberia Líneas Aéreas de España S.A.) and Aviaco (Aviación y Comercio), and the aircraft manufacturer CASA (Construcciones Aeronáuticas S.A.). It absorbed failed companies in order to service debt, among other purposes. In the mid-to late 1970s, HUNOSA (Hulleras del Norte S.A.), a large Asturian coal mining conglomerate, and Compañía Transatlántica Española (CTE) were among the non-functional companies that were integrated into the Instituto Nacional de Industria.

However, there were other Spanish state owned companies such as Campsa (Compañía Arrendataria del Monopolio de Petróleos S.A.; filling stations), RENFE (Red Nacional de los Ferrocarriles Españoles; railways), RTVE (public broadcaster), Tabacalera (tobacco), or Telefónica (Compañía Telefónica Nacional de España; telecommunications) that were never under INI's control.

In the 1980s, when the Spanish economy was fully opened to international trade and joined the European Economic Community, INI lost its raison d'être. Most of its companies were privatized in the 1980s and early 1990s. In this process, ENSIDESA was taken over by Arcelor, SEAT by Volkswagen Group, ENASA by Iveco, Calvo Sotelo by Repsol, and so on. Others, including ENDESA and Iberia, have kept their independence.

In 1992 INI was entitled to create a new holding company (Sociedad Anónima) over which it would pass all shares owned in every company's capital it had still participated. The new company named TENEO, which was founded on July 4 of the same year, merged into Sociedad Estatal de Participaciones Industriales (SEPI) in 1996 and the latter has practically disposed the totality of its owned shares with the exception of HUNOSA and a few other industries. In 1995 the INI was abolished.

== Presidents ==
The chairmen of the INI were as follows:

- Juan Antonio Suanzes (1941–1963)
- José Sirvent (1963–1969)
- Julio Calleja (1969–1970)
- Claudio Boada (1970–1974)
- Francisco Fernández Ordóñez (1974)
- Juan Carlos Guerra Zunzunegui (1974–1975)
- José Miguel Antoñanzas (1975–1977)
- Francisco Giménez Torres (1977–1978)
- José Miguel de la Rica (1978–1981)
- Carlos Bustelo (1981–1982)
- Enrique Moya (1982–1984)
- Luis Carlos Croissier (1984–1986)
- Claudio Aranzadi (1986–1988)
- Jordi Mercader (1988–1990)
- Javier Salas (1990–1995)

== Bibliography ==
- Laruelo Rueda, E. (2005) "Fondos históricos del INI", Centro de Documentación, Arhivo General del SEPI.
- Martín Aceña, P. et Comín, F. (1991) "INI: 50 Años de Industrialización en España". Espasa-Calpe.
