= Nicolás de la Quadra =

Spanish painter (1663–1728)

Nicolás Antonio de la Quadra (San Julián de Musquiz, 1663 - Bilbao, 1728) was a Spanish painter associated with the Madrid school of Baroque painting. There is a life-size portrait (1695) by him in the Carmelite Convent at Madrid.
