= Distrito Telefónica =

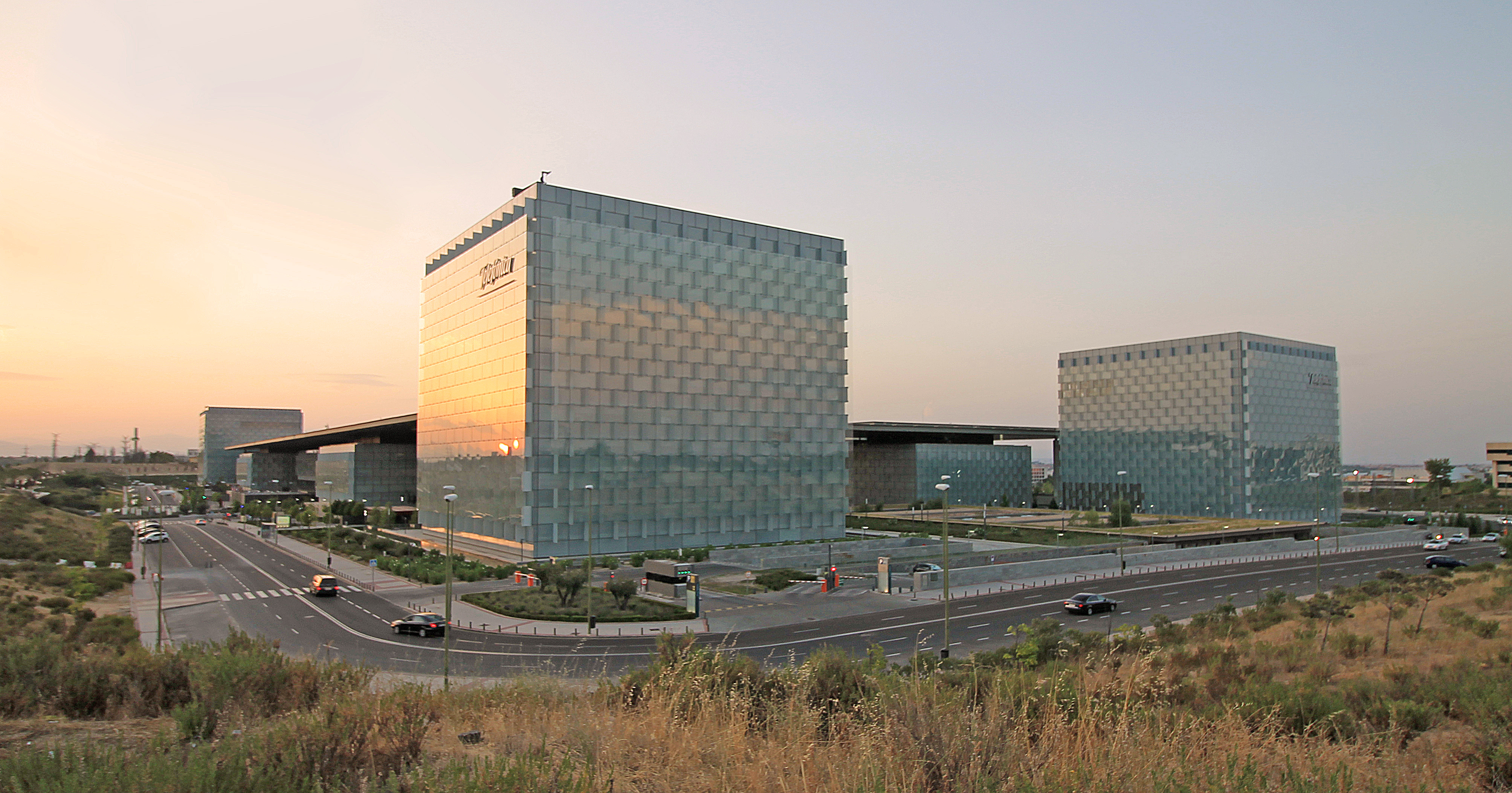
- Facade of Distrito Telefónica.

General information
- Type: Offices
- Location: Madrid, Spain
- Coordinates: 40°30′53″N 3°39′48″W
- Construction started: 2004
- Completed: 2008
- Cost: € 500 million
- Owner: Telefónica

Technical details
- Grounds: 140,000 m^{2} (1,500,000 sq ft)

Design and construction
- Architect: Rafael de La-Hoz

Distrito Telefónica is the headquarters of the Spanish telecom company Telefónica, S.A. in Las Tablas, a neighborhood in the Fuencarral-El Pardo district of Madrid, Spain, accessible from the A-1 "Autovía del Norte" and the M-40 ring road. The complex was known as Distrito C or Distrito de las Comunicaciones ("Communications District") until 2011.

== Design ==
The project was designed by Rafael de La-Hoz. It was built in 36 months on 370,000 square metres in Las Tablas, a growing area between Madrid and Alcobendas. This project has been acknowledged several times, due to the management of its Madrid Metro station (Ronda de la Comunicación on Line 10) and the different roads.

The buildings cover 140,000 square meters and they were, at the time, the largest project in Europe in terms of glass, even more so than the ones of Ciudad Financiera del Banco Santander (Financial City of Banco Santander) and Madrid-Barajas Airport. This district consists of twelve office buildings: four ten-storey buildings at each end and eight four-storey buildings in between. This complex also includes a shopping centre, which is open to the public and there are several other buildings for additional services. The purpose of Distrito Telefónica is to gather in one place all the company’s resources to ensure significant savings in the structure of its management.

The investment was over 500 million euros and has been mostly financed with the sale or rental of several properties owned by Telefónica in Madrid. Distrito Telefónica hosts 14,000 people, including the Group’s staff and visitors.

=== Energy savings ===
The design of Telefónica’s complex entails large savings in air conditioning and heating (15% in the winter and 34% in the summer), and it will decrease CO_{2} emissions by 5,000 tons a year. The choice of glass façades means a saving of 42% in lighting costs.

=== Prizes and awards ===
- "Premio a la Obra Internacional" at the XI Bienal Internacional de Arquitectura Argentina BA07
- Premio Aedip 2009
