= Hospital Universitario Rey Juan Carlos =

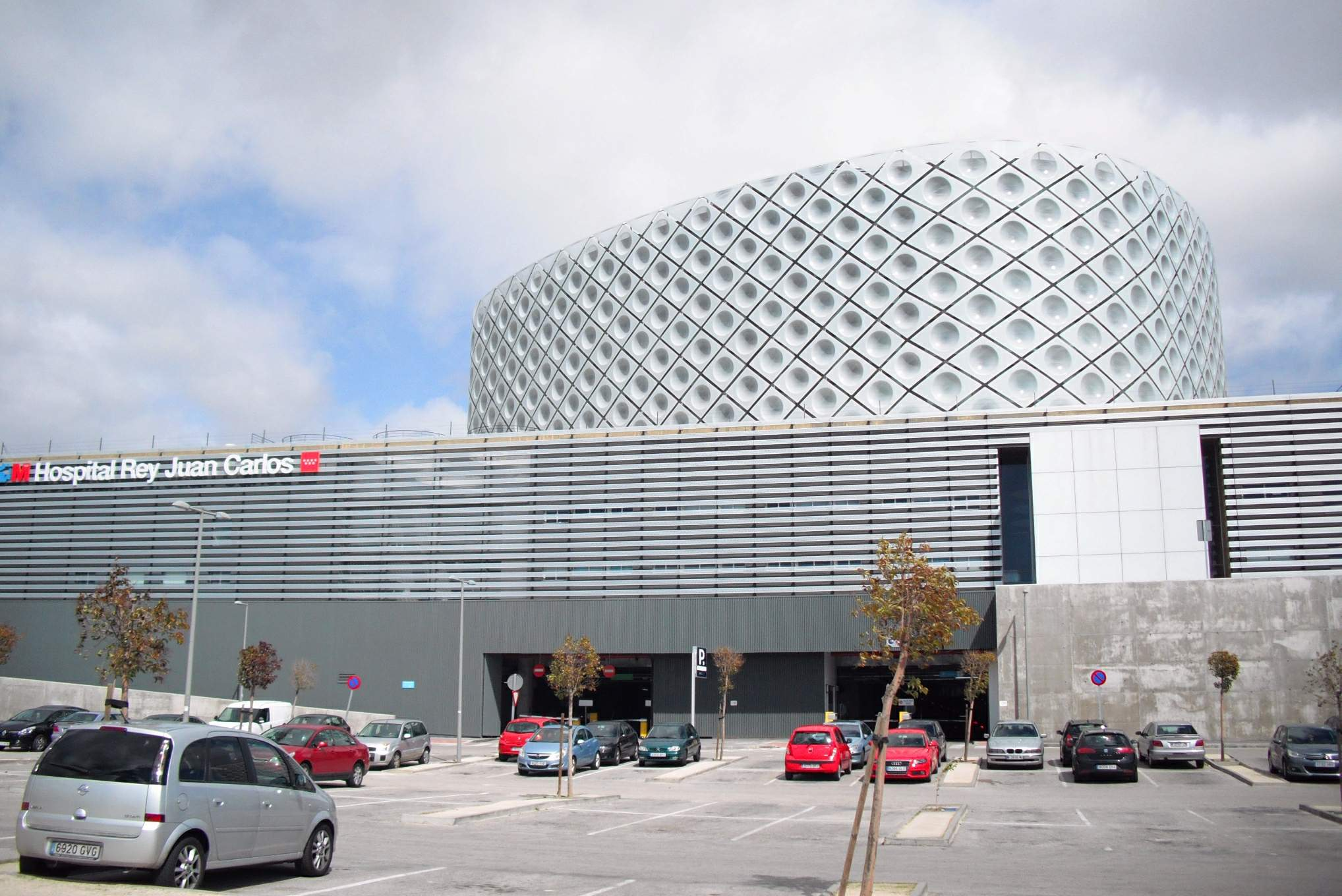

Geography
- Location: Calle Gladiolo s/n, 28933, Móstoles, Community of Madrid, Spain
- Coordinates: 40.33881°N 3.87131°W

Organisation
- Network: Servicio Madrileño de Salud

History
- Opened: 21 March 2012

The Hospital Universitario Rey Juan Carlos is a general hospital in Móstoles, Spain, part of the Servicio Madrileño de Salud (SERMAS) network.

Inaugurated on 21 March 2012, it is the second hospital in the municipality of Móstoles, after the Hospital Universitario de Móstoles. The management was allocated to Capio, a private company; this was a cause of protests at the time of the opening.

The hospital building was designed by Rafael de La-Hoz Castanys.
