= Muskiz =

- Municipality
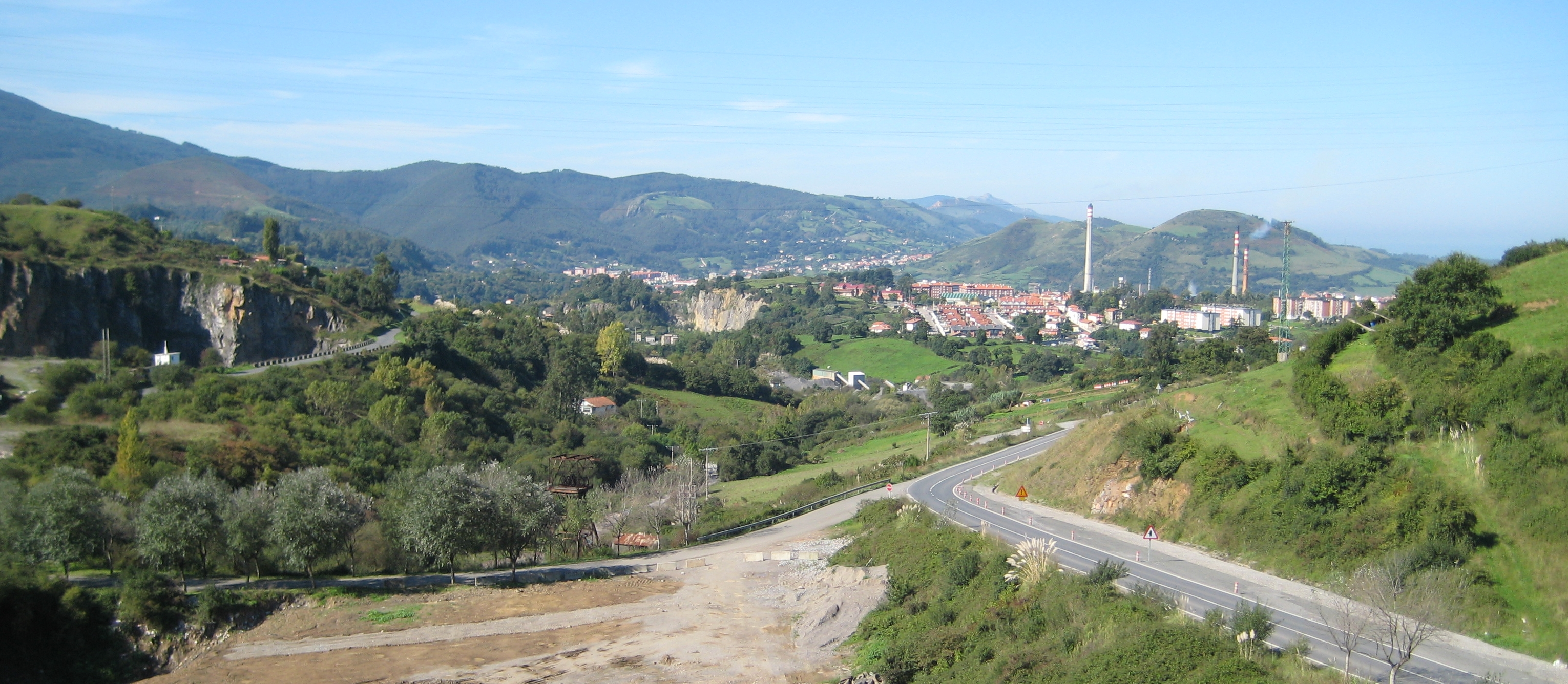
- View from Gallarta

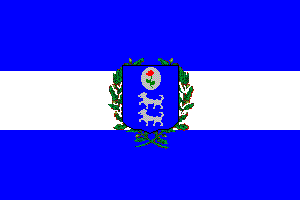
- Flag Coat of arms

- Location of Muskiz within the Basque Country Location of Muskiz within Spain
- Coordinates: 43°19′24″N 3°7′18″W
- Country: Spain
- Autonomous community: Basque Country
- Province: Biscay
- Comarca: Greater Bilbao

Government
  - Alcalde: Borja Liaño (EAJ-PNV)

Area
  - Total: 21.5 km^{2} (8.3 sq mi)
- Elevation: 10 m (33 ft)

Population (2025-01-01)
  - Total: 7,465
  - Density: 347/km^{2} (899/sq mi)
- Demonym: muskiztarra
- Time zone: UTC+1 (CET)
- Postal code: 48550
- Official language(s): Basque, Spanish
- Website: Official website

Muskiz is a town and municipality located in the province of Biscay, in the autonomous community of the Basque Country, northern Spain.

== Neighborhoods ==
Muskiz is administratively divided into six neighborhoods or wards:

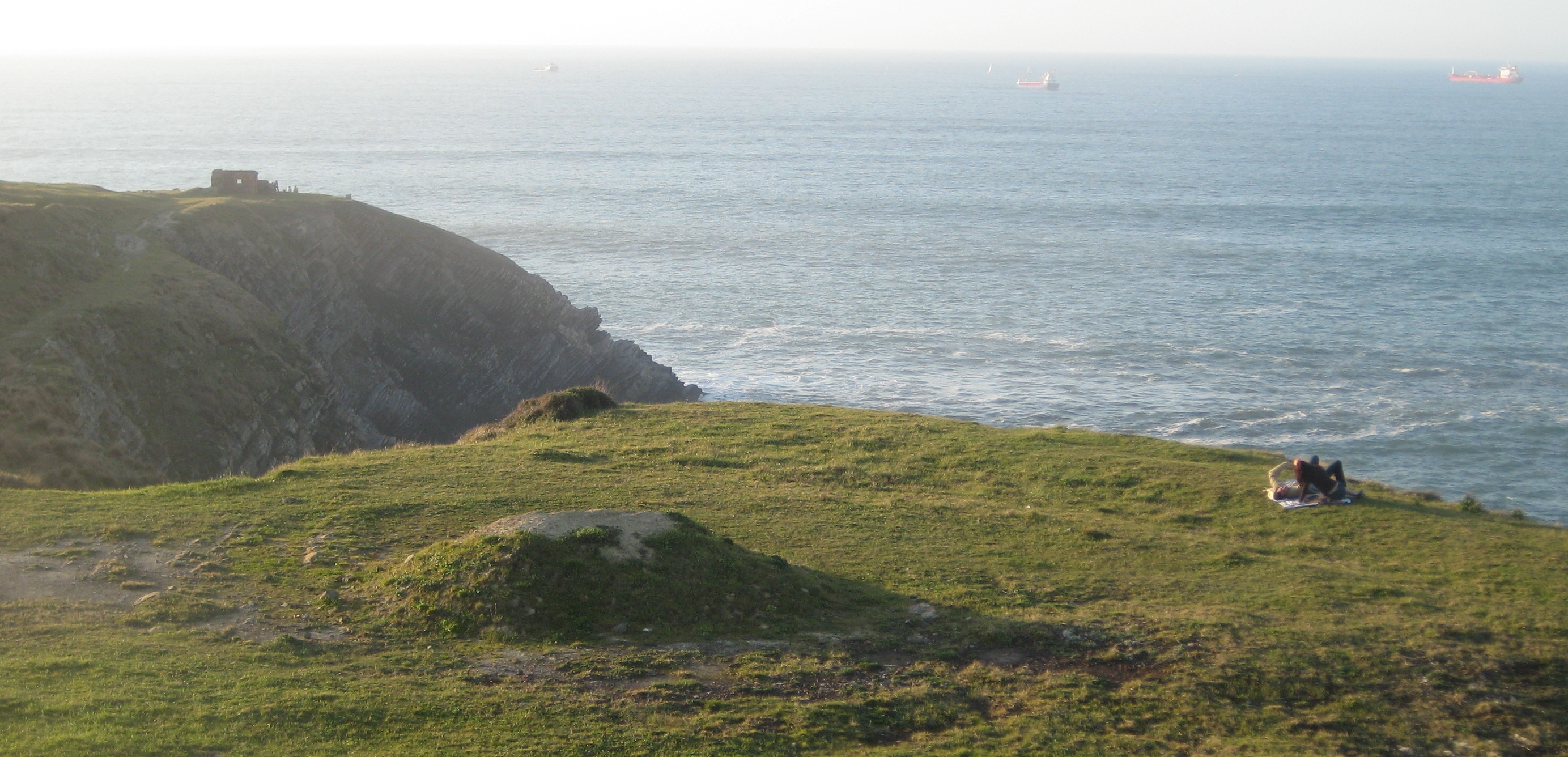
Cobarón

Official name	Basque name
Cobarón	Kobaron
(La) Rigada	Larrainaga
Pobeña	Pobeña
San Juan	San Juan Muskiz
San Julián	San Julian
Santelices	Santelices

== Demography ==
Population of Muskiz
1897	1900	1910	1920	1930	1940	1950	1960	1970	1981	1991	2001	2006
2,468	2,663	4,069	4,239	4,345	4,060	4,077	4,733	6,011	6,054	6,358	6,558	6,839

== Economy ==
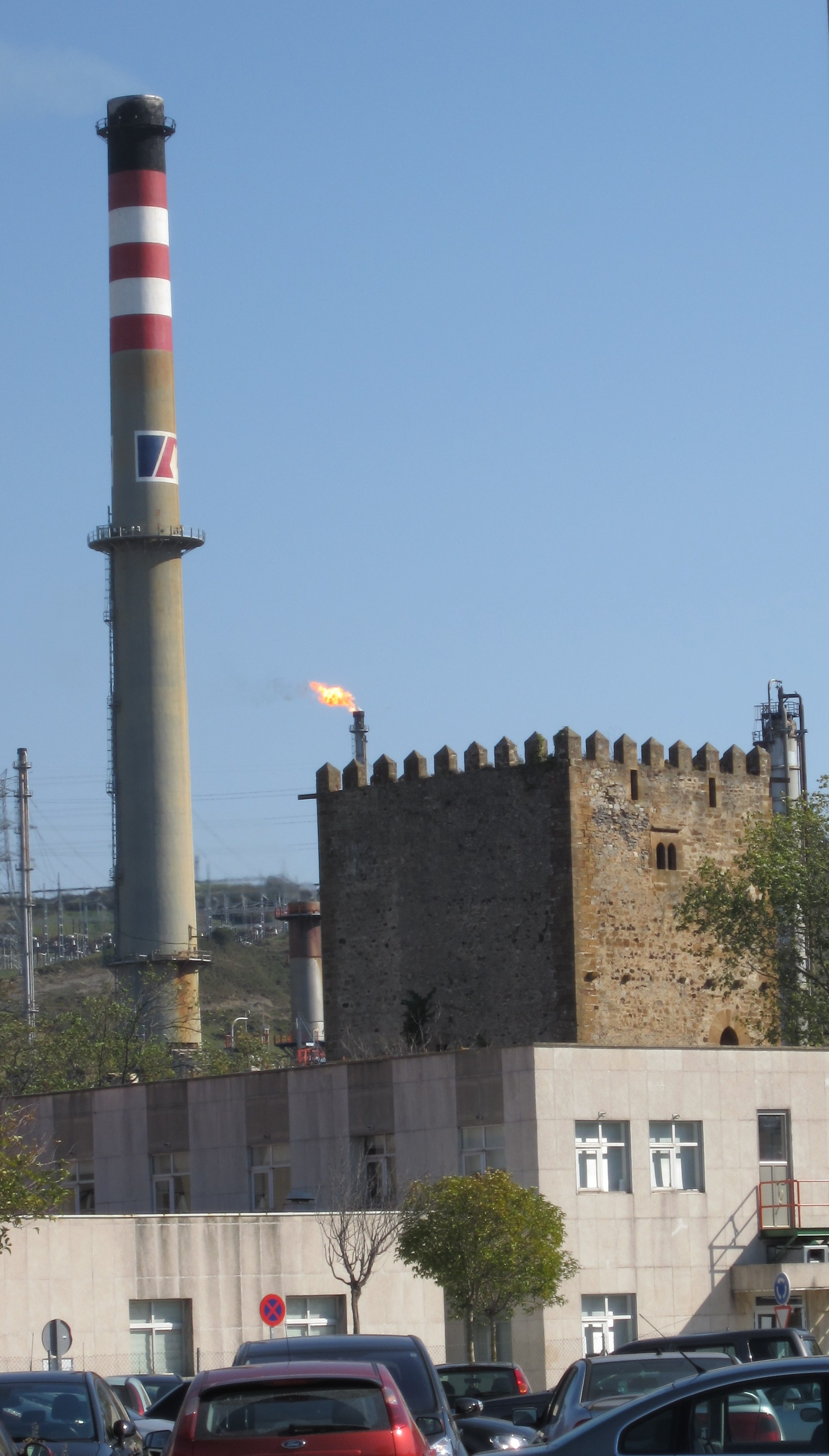
Castle of Muñatones and refinery of Petronor.

In the 1970s the petrochemical company Petronor built a refinery with a 222 metres tall chimney called La Catalítica.

== Notable people ==
- Nicolás de la Quadra, painter
- Jose Ramon Campos, painter
