= Antonio Brufau Niubó =

Spanish businessman (born 1948)

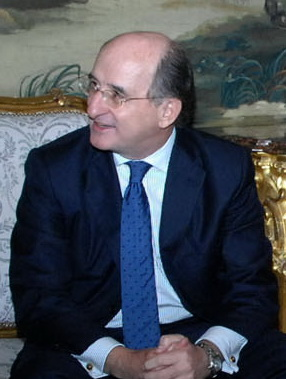
- Born: Antonio Brufau Niubó; 12 March 1948 (age 78); Mollerussa, Spain
- Education: University of Barcelona (BA); University of Navarra (MA)
- Occupations: CEO and Chairman of Repsol

Antonio Brufau Niubó (born 12 March 1948) is the CEO and Chairman of the multinational oil and gas company Repsol, a role he has been in since 2004.

== Career ==
After education, Brufau worked in Arthur Andersen where he became a partner and a director of auditing. In 1988, he joined La Caixa, as deputy general manager and head industrial entity. Within this capacity, along with then President Josep Vilarasau and Isidre Fainé, he assisted in the amalgamation of the Pension Fund of Catalonia and the Balearic Islands and Box de Ahorros y Monte de Piedad Barcelona. In 1994, on behalf of La Caixa, he became president of Port Aventura.

In July 1997, he was appointed the president of the natural gas division at Repsol, a post he held until 2004. From 1996 to 2004, Brufau was a member of the Board of Directors of Repsol.

In July 2002, he was appointed president of Circulo de Economía de Barcelona, a position that he held until July 2005.

In 2004, he was appointed CEO of Repsol YPF. Since his appointment at Repsol, the company has revamped its organizational structure and set the priorities for growth in upstream growth, downstream growth and liquefied natural gas.

In addition to his roles at Repsol, Brufau is the vice chairman of Gas Natural Fenosa.

In April 2021 Spanish High Court placed Brufau and Isidre Fainé, former chairman of Caixabank, under formal investigation. The court is investigating whether Repsol and Caixabank hired a security firm belonging to former police chief José Manuel Villarejo, to spy on a business competitor.

== Awards ==
Brufau was awarded the 2010 Entrepreneur of the Year award by the Federation of Spanish Chambers of Commerce in Europe (FEDECOM) in recognition of his stewardship of Repsol's increasing activity outside its country of origin.

== Education and personal details ==
Brufau has a degree in Economics from the University of Barcelona and an MA in Economics from IESE Business School - Universidad de Navarra.

He was the only Spanish member in the Executive Committee of the International Chamber of Commerce until December 2005.
