= Torres de Hercules =

Skyscraper in Spain

Torres de Hércules
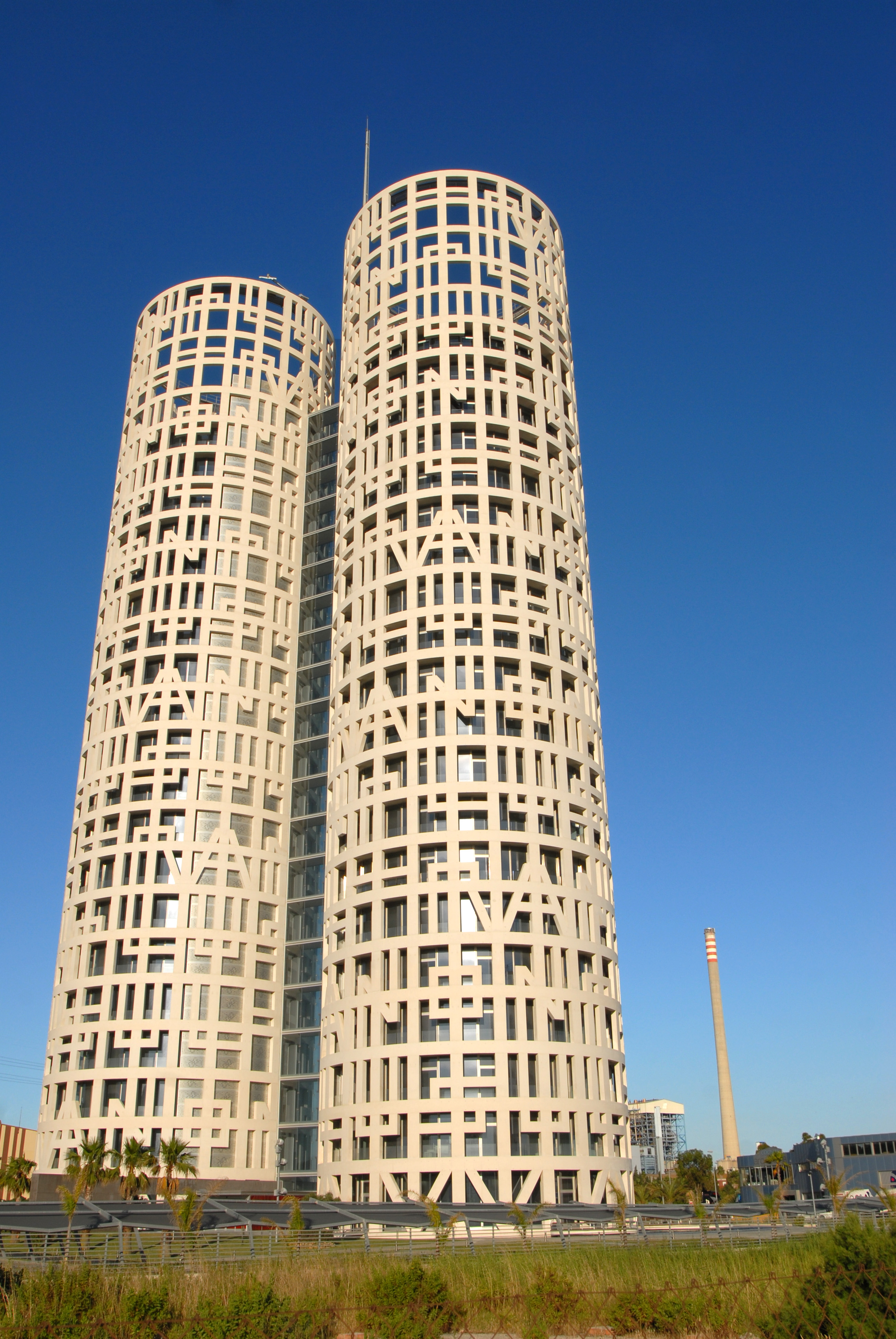
- Torres de Hércules business center
- Interactive map of the Torres de Hércules area

General information
- Type: Office
- Location: Polígono Industrial Las Marismas; Los Barrios, Spain
- Coordinates: 36°10′41″N 5°25′42″W
- Construction started: 2006
- Completed: 2009

Height
- Roof: 100.6 m (330 ft)

Technical details
- Floor count: 20
- Lifts/elevators: 6

Design and construction
- Architect: Rafael de La-Hoz Castanys
- Developer: Constructora Valcruz

The Torres de Hércules (English: Towers of Hercules) are office buildings in Polígono Industrial Las Marismas, Los Barrios in Province of Cádiz. The building is 100.6 m (330 ft) tall and was completed in October 2009. The telecommunications antenna on top is 26 m (85 ft) tall. Each of the towers is 20 m (66 ft) in diameter. These towers were the tallest in Andalusia until Cajasol Tower was completed in Seville in 2015.

== Description ==
The towers are inspired by the Pillars of Hercules which were the two mountains on either side of the sea which signified that no one could go beyond the Straits of Gibraltar as the Atlantic Ocean started and this was uncharted. The two 20 story towers are linked together by glass hallways on each floor.
