= Petronor =

Petroleum company based in Spain

Petróleos del Norte, S.A.
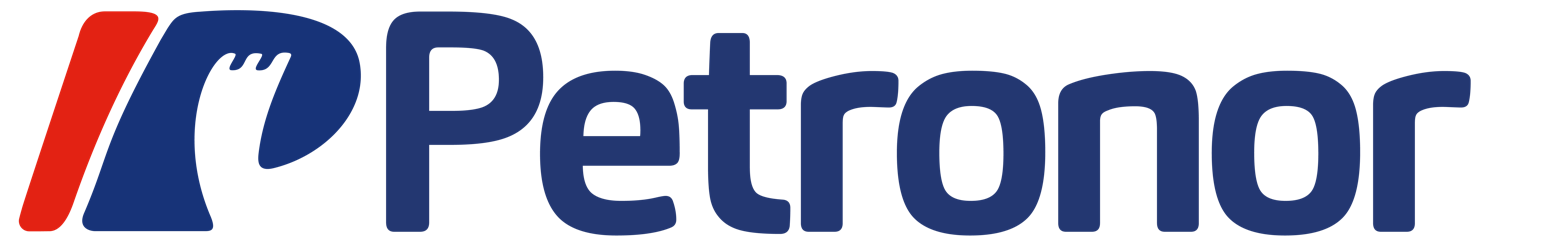
- Type: Sociedad Anónima
- Industry: Petroleum
- Founded: 30 November 1968
- Headquarters: Muskiz, Spain
- Number of locations: Bilbao, Basque Country
- Area served: Nationwide
- Key people: Emiliano López Atxurra (Chairman)
- Services: Filling stations
- Revenue: ▼€ 4.6 billion (2016)
- Net income: ▲€ 222.4 million (2016)
- Owner: Repsol (85.98%); Kutxabank (14.02%)
- Number of employees: 875
- Parent: Repsol S.A.
- Website: www.petronor.eus

Petróleos del Norte S.A. (Petronor) is a Spanish oil and gas company based in Muskiz, Basque Country. The company was established on 30 November 1968. From 1976 to 1981, its executive manager was Nemesio Fernández-Cuesta.

It is owned by Repsol (85.98%), and Kutxabank (14.02%).

== History ==
Petronor was founded on November 30, 1968, with the participation of Basque bourgeoisie figures such as Javier Ybarra, Fernando Ybarra, Pedro Careaga or Alfonso de Churruca -the latter being the president of CAMPSA. The company was born with the aim of building an oil refinery in the north of Spain, after having received authorization to do so from the Franco regime. At the beginning of the 1970s, the shareholders of Petronor included Gulf Oil, Campsa, Río Gulf-Explosivos Río Tinto and several financial institutions in Biscay.

== Sponsorship ==
Between 2008 and 2015, Petronor was the main kit sponsor of Spanish football club Athletic Club.
