= Exolum =

Multinational petroleum logistics company

Exolum Corporation, S.A.

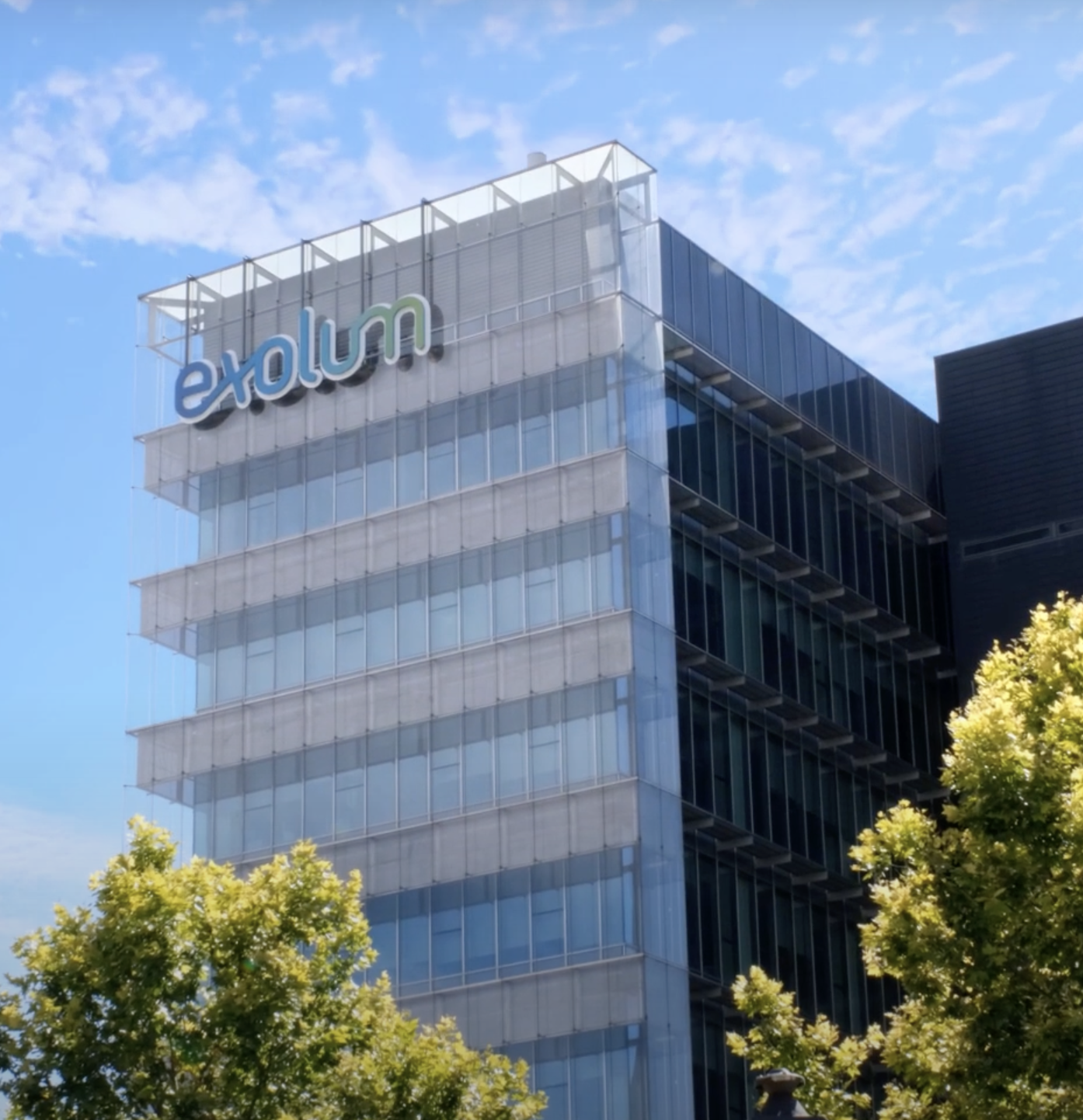
- Exolum Headquarters in Madrid
- Trade name: Exolum
- Industry: Petroleum logistics industry
- Founded: 1993
- Headquarters: Madrid, Spain
- Key people: Alfredo Barrios (Chairman); Javier Goñi (CEO)
- Services: Storage and transportation of oil products
- Website: exolum.com

The Exolum Group is a Spanish multinational company offering services for the transportation and storage of oil products. The Exolum Group is made up of Exolum Corporation, S.A., Exolum Aviación, S.A., Terminales Químicos, S.A. (Terquimsa), CLH Pipeline System Ltd (CLH-PS) in the United Kingdom, CLH Aviation Ireland in Ireland, CLH Panamá and CLH Aviación Ecuador. The company was formed from what used to be CAMPSA (Compañía Arrendataria del Monopolio de Petróleos, founded in 1927). CLH (Compañía Logística de Hidrocarburos) is the result of the 1993 spin-off of the commercial assets of the former CAMPSA, which was carried out as the culmination of the process of deregulating the oil sector following the passing of new European Community laws that ended the oil monopoly. The Exolum Group's main activity consists of transporting oil products – essentially gasoline, diesel, fuel oils, and aviation fuels – from oil refineries to the storage facilities that the company has in Spain, The Netherlands, and The UK where its customers' tank trucks load these products and deliver them to the final consumers.

The International Energy Agency has given recognition to the flexibility and capacity this integrated storage and transportation system has for responding to unforeseen events. The company also provides services related to consultancy and advice for international companies in the oil or logistics sectors, gaining its first experiences in countries such as Panama, Ecuador, and Peru. Another service that Exolum is fostering is strategic storage for European Union countries.

Exolum Aviation (formerly CLH Aviación), created in 1997, is a wholly owned subsidiary of Exolum, and operates at most of the Spanish airports and some locations in Europe such as Ireland. They offer services for the storage, distribution, and into-plane supply of aviation fuels and lubricants. Exolum Aviation also provides advice and technical assistance for the installation and maintenance of distribution networks for different types of aviation fuel.

The company has received recognition from external bodies, including the rating from SAM (Sustainable Asset Management) for sustainability in its sector, the European Seal of Excellence 500+, various quality certificates from AENOR, and the Family-Responsible Company (EFR) seal of approval.

== Share structure ==
Royal Decree-Law 6/2000 prohibits any Exolum shareholder from holding more than 25% of the total number of company shares.(Stock market listing data)

The shareholdings are distributed as follows:

Shareholder	Percentage
CVC	24.84%
OMERS	24.61%
Macquarie Group	19.87%
Crédit Agricole	9.93%
APG	9.93%
Investment Management Corporation of Ontario	9.93%
Others	0.89%

== Infrastructure ==
=== Storage ===
Exolum has 40 storage facilities, with a capacity of more than 8 million cubic meters, for all types of oil products. They are distributed across Spain, the Balearic Islands and in many countries across Europe and the UK.

=== Pipelines ===
The company has a network of more than 4,000 kilometres (2,500 mi) of pipelines that connect eight Spanish refineries with their storage facilities. The Exolum Group logistics system is the most extensive civil pipeline network in Western Europe.

=== Merchant fleet ===
The Exolum Group has two tankers in its fleet, the Tinerfe and the Castillo de Trujillo, that are used for transporting fuel to the Balearic Islands and to areas in the Peninsula that are not reached by the pipeline network.

Name	Capacity (m³)	Gross registered tons
Tinerfe	18.611	11.259
Castillo de Trujillo	37.637	21.656

=== Airport facilities ===
CLH Aviación has 28 airport facilities that are located in the major Spanish airports in the Iberian Peninsula and the Balearic Islands, where it provides aviation fuel supply services to aircraft.

At Madrid/Barajas, Barcelona, Palma, Malaga and Alicante, the company has hydrant networks laid beneath the airport apron, which enable aircraft to be refuelled without the need to use tanker vehicles. It also has a fleet of 113 refuellers and 48 hydrant dispenser vehicles that are specially designed for supplying aircraft with fuel.

== International expansion ==
=== Exolum Pipeline System ===
Exolum Pipeline System Ltd is an oil product logistics company, wholly owned by Exolum, that carries out its activities in the United Kingdom. Exolum operates one of the main fuel pipeline and storage networks in the UK, which was formerly owned by the UK government. Its infrastructure consists of a pipeline network of 2,000 kilometers, which represents 50% of the British pipeline network, and 13 storage facilities.

The Exolum Pipeline System supplies 35% of the demand for aviation fuel in the United Kingdom. Heathrow, Gatwick, Stansted and Manchester are among the main airports it supplies, in addition to ten other regional airports that are supplied by road tanker.

=== CLH Aviation Ireland ===
CLH Aviation Ireland is wholly owned by CLH Aviación and manages the fuel storage terminal at Dublin Airport, where it provides logistics services for the receipt, storage and dispatch of Jet A1. The company manages the aviation fuel infrastructure at Dublin Airport under an open-access (non-discriminatory) system for all oil suppliers that operate at this airport and the different into-plane agents. In addition, CLH Aviation Ireland is currently undertaking a major renovation project at the terminal, including the expansion of its plant capacity and the construction of a new hydrant system. The new facility will include three storage tanks of 5,000 cubic meters each, office and service buildings, parking areas, pumping stations, loading systems for into-plane units, in addition to advanced safety systems. The project also involves the construction of a hydrant system at the airport boarding piers to facilitate into-plane operations, which will be connected to the storage terminal, thus allowing for improved into-plane operations.

=== OLC ===
CLH has a 40% shareholding in a joint venture entered into with the Omani company ORPIC (owner of the 60% share) under the name of Orpic Logistics Company (OLC), which is responsible for the construction and management of a storage facility near Muscat, the capital of Oman, and a network of multiproduct pipelines linking the new storage facility with two existing refineries in the country and the international airport in Muscat. In 2022, OQ Group repurchased Exolum's stake in OLC.
