= Campsa =

Spanish state-owned petroleum products company

Compañía Arrendataria del Monopolio del Petróleo, S.A.
- Type: Sociedad Anónima
- Industry: Petroleum
- Founded: Madrid, Spain (June 28, 1927)
- Defunct: 1992
- Headquarters: Madrid, Spain
- Key people: José Luis Díaz Fernández, CEO

Compañía Arrendataria del Monopolio del Petróleo, S.A. (Campsa) was the state-owned petroleum products company of Spain. Created in the 1920s during General Primo de Rivera's dictatorship, it was dissolved in 1992 owing to the demands of the European Union. Its assets were distributed to the largest private petroleum companies in the Spanish market at the time, which were mainly Repsol, Cepsa and BP. The rights to the Campsa brand were given to Repsol.

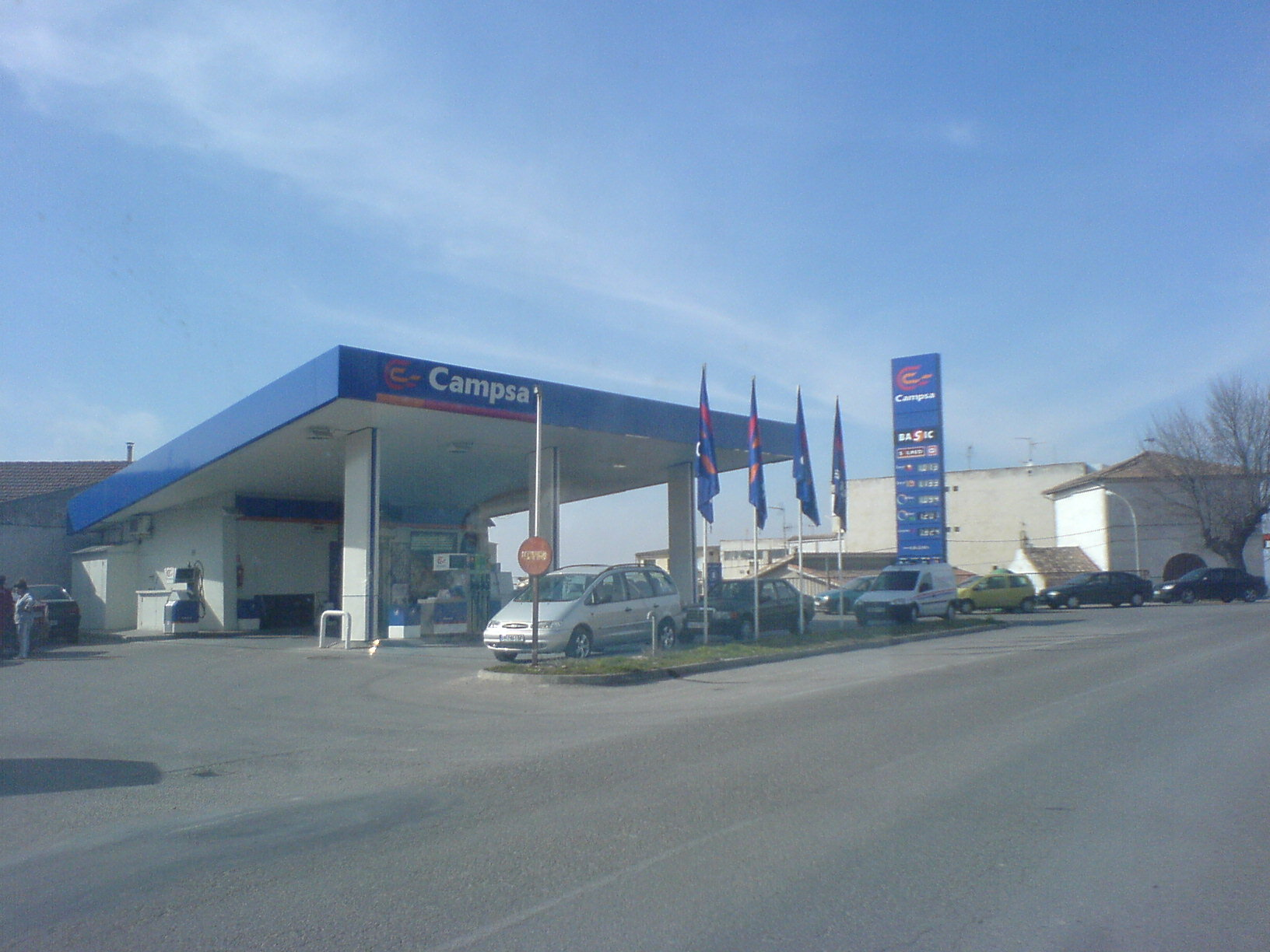
Campsa service station in Valladolid

The remaining assets of the company, primarily focused on logistics and pipeline services but also its historical archives, were incorporated under the name Compañía Logística de Hidrocaburos, S.A. (CLH). Following a 2008 agreement between CLH and the National Energy Commission the latter took over the archives.

During the period of the Second Republic, CAMPSA's activity was focused on the commercialization of oil and its derivatives, for which it built 16 storage areas and another 34 smaller storage points. However, it practically did not develop exploration activities for oilfields on Spanish soil, nor did it acquire oilfields abroad.

== History ==
The Compañía arrendataria del monopolio del petróleo (C.A.M.P.S.A.) was created on 24 June 1927 by a consortium of Spanish banks: Banco Urquijo, Banco Hispano-Americano, Banco Español de Crédito, Banco Herrero, Banco de Vizcaya, Banco de Bilbao, Banco de Cataluña, Banco Hispano Colonial and Banca Marsans.
