= Repsol =

Spanish multinational energy and petrochemical company

Repsol S.A.
- Logo used since 2025

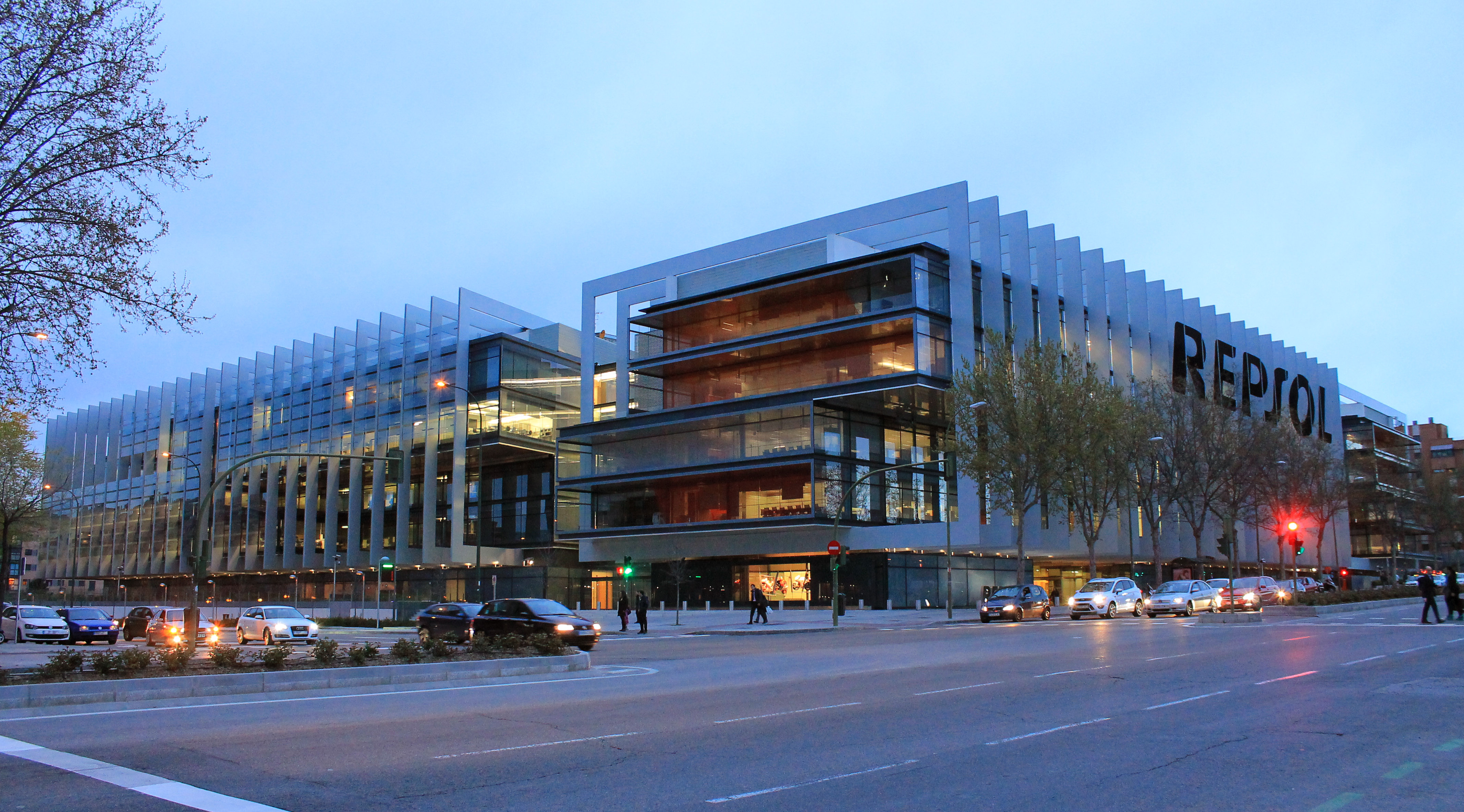
- Headquarters in Madrid, Spain, April 2014
- Type: Sociedad Anónima
- Traded as: BMAD: REP; IBEX 35
- ISIN: ES0173516115
- Industry: Petroleum
- Predecessor: Instituto Nacional de Hidrocarburos
- Founded: 1986; 40 years ago
- Founder: Miguel Primo de Rivera y Orbaneja (as CAMPSA in 1927)
- Headquarters: Repsol Campus, Madrid and Muskiz (Basque Country), Spain
- Area served: Worldwide
- Key people: Antonio Brufau Niubó (Chairman); Josu Jon Imaz San Miguel (CEO)
- Products: Oil and gas exploration and production, natural gas and LNG trading and transportation, oil refining, petrochemistry
- Services: Fuel stations
- Revenue: ▲€78.724 billion (2022)
- Operating income: ▲€10.648 billion (2022)
- Net income: ▲€4.251 billion (2022)
- Total assets: ▲€59.964 billion (2022)
- Total equity: ▲€24.611 billion (2022)
- Number of employees: 23,810 (2022)
- Subsidiaries: Repsol Petróleo, Repsol Butano, Repsol Química, Repsol Exploración, Petronor
- Website: repsol.com

Repsol S.A. (Note: Originally an initialism for Refinería de Petróleos de Escombreras adding the word Sol (Sun)) (Spanish pronunciation: [reβˈsol]) is a Spanish multinational energy and petrochemical company based in Madrid. It is engaged in worldwide upstream and downstream activities. In the 2022 Forbes Global 2000, Repsol was ranked as the 320th-largest public company in the world. As of 2022, it has 24,000 employees worldwide.

It is vertically integrated and operates in all areas of the oil and gas industry, including exploration and production, refining, distribution and marketing, petrochemicals, power generation and trading. Repsol's business strategy includes hydraulic fracturing (fracking) operations on the Alaska North Slope, a method used to extract hydrocarbons from shale formations.

As of 2021 Repsol had a renewable energy division.

== History ==
=== CAMPSA and REPESA ===
In 1927, CAMPSA (Compañía Arrendataria del Monopolio de Petróleos S.A.), headed by Miguel Primo de Rivera y Orbaneja, was created with the objective of administering concessions related to the state monopoly on petroleum products. Originally, the company was structured so that the state would have a minority stake. The creation of CAMPSA intensified the development of the Spanish refining industry.

In 1941, the Spanish government under Francisco Franco created the INI (National Industry Institute) in order to finance and promote Spanish industries. The INI supported CAMPSA in its exploration of Tudanca, Cantabria, a significant moment in hydrocarbon exploration on the Iberian Peninsula. In 1947, a 20-year contract between the Spanish state and CAMPSA ended, decentralizing services while granting the state specific rights to intervene in the company's affairs, except for distribution and commercialization, which remained exclusive to CAMPSA.

In 1948, REPESA (Refinería de Petróleos de Escombreras S.A.) was incorporated for the installation of a refinery in the Valley of Escombreras (Cartagena).

REPESA reflected the growing industrial consolidation of the refining sector through the production and marketing of petrol, oils, and lubricants under its own brands. REPSOL was introduced as REPESA's leading petroleum brand from the outset. From the beginning, REPSOL was REPESA's principal petroleum brand and product brand.

=== International expansion ===
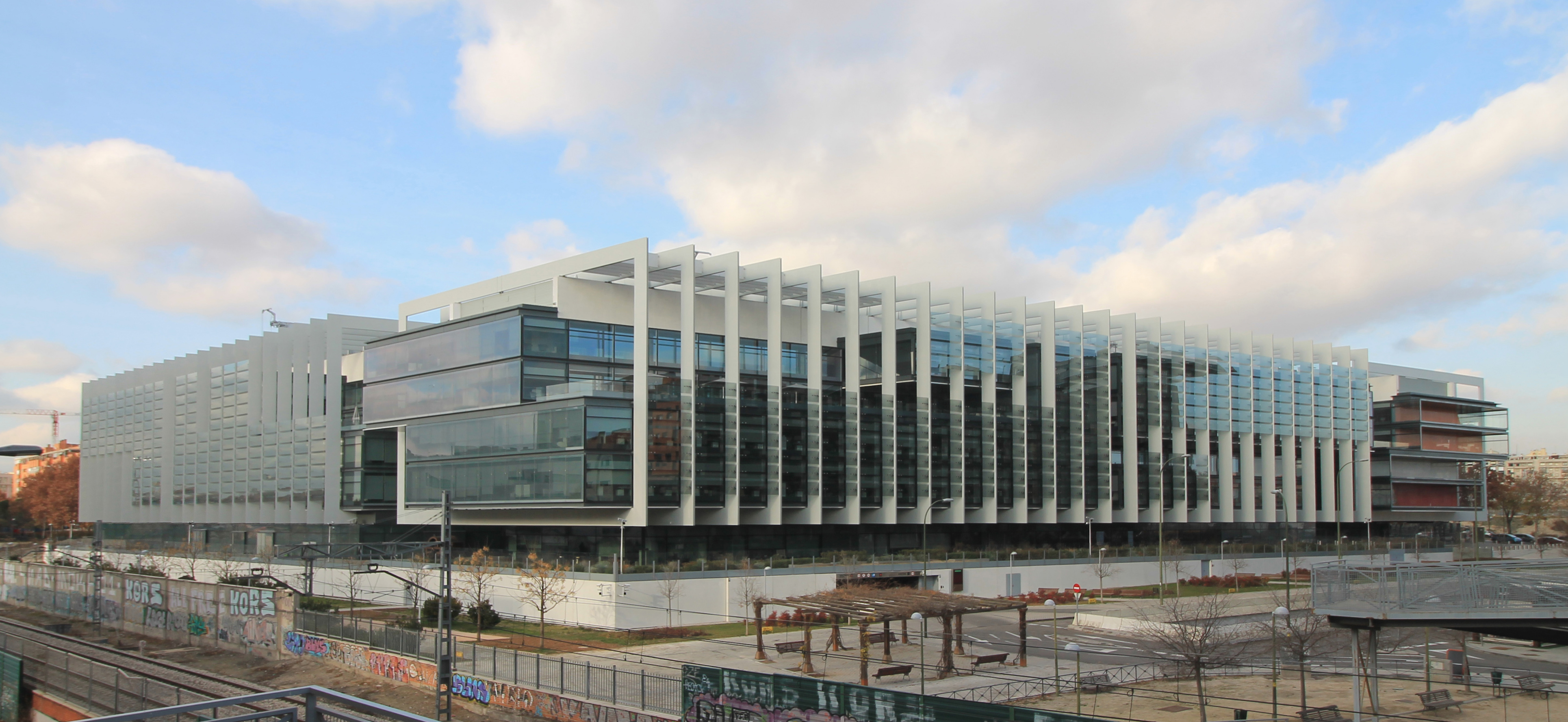
Repsol Campus in Madrid, company's headquarters built in 2013.

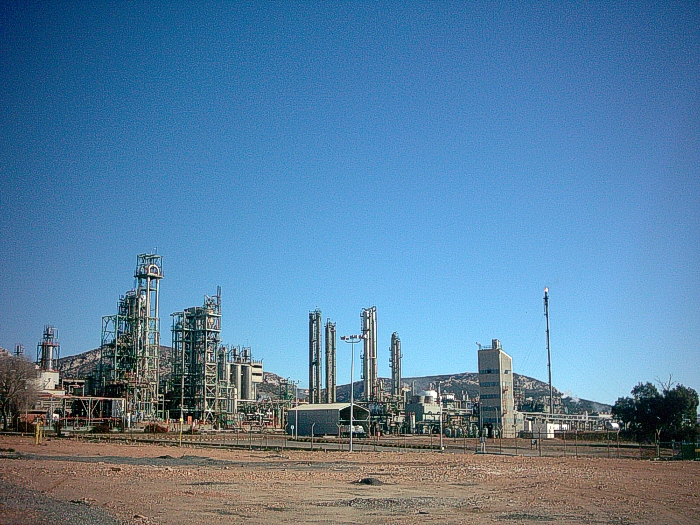
Repsol oil refinery in Puertollano.

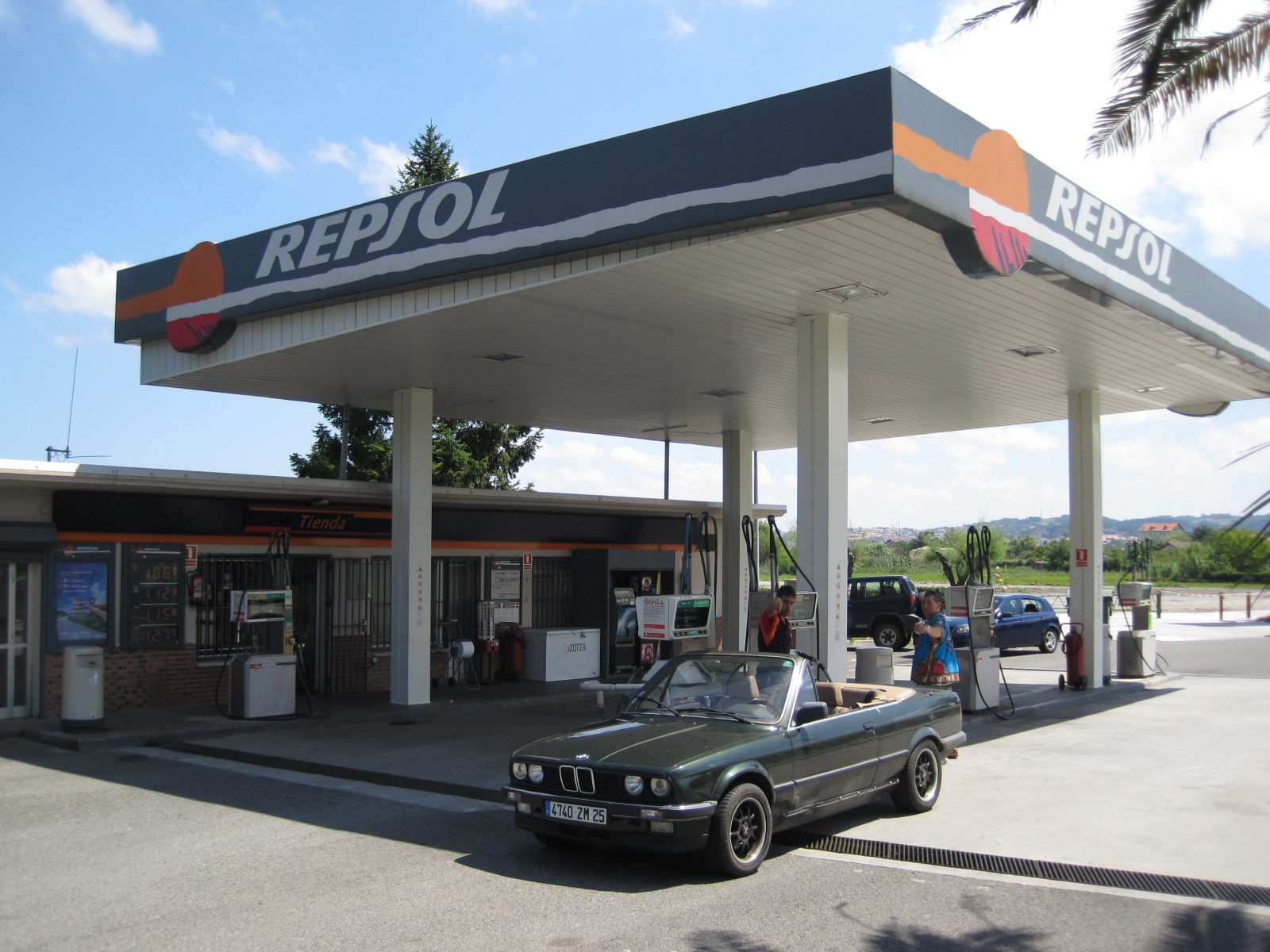
A Repsol service station.

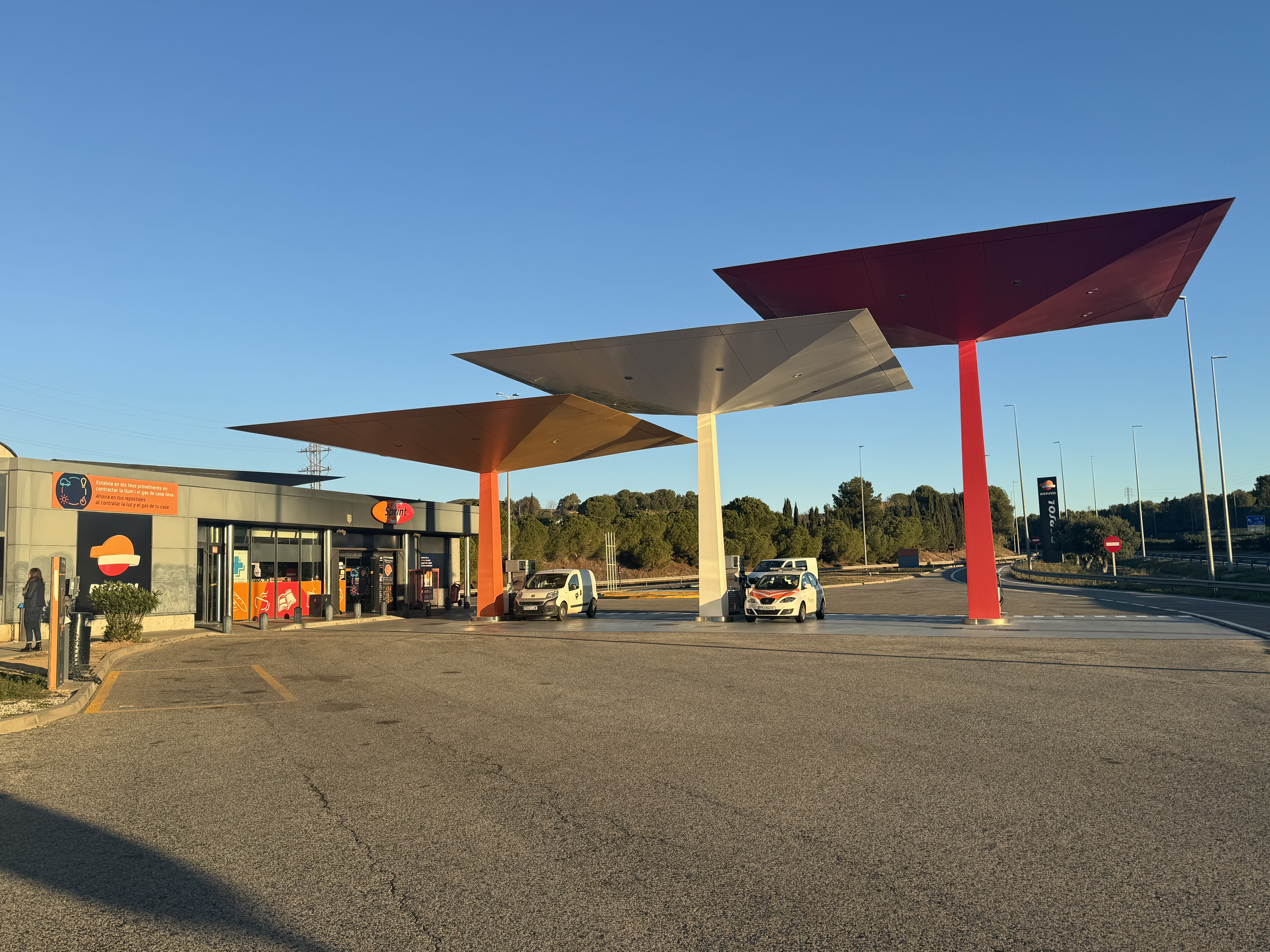
A Repsol in Cubelles, Barcelona, Spain.

In 1999, Repsol bought 97.81% of the Argentine oil and gas company YPF S.A., which at the time was the largest oil-and-gas company in Ibero America. The acquisition better positioned Repsol as a multinational company. Repsol's acquisition of YPF also increased its capital to 288 million shares worldwide. Repsol's presence in Latin America was one of the keys to corporate growth. It was the first full year after the acquisition of YPF and the consolidation of Gas Natural SDG by global integration. The company's business structure was more balanced and international. Then in December 2001, Repsol completed an asset exchange agreement with Petrobras, making it the second largest consolidated oil company in Brazil. The same year Repsol announced new discoveries in Libya, Indonesia, Spain, Venezuela, Argentina, and Bolivia, prompting the development and marketing of its electricity business through Gas Natural SDG. In 2003, Repsol tripled its reserves and production of hydrocarbons in Trinidad and Tobago. North American expansion in 2008 saw Repsol open a massive regasification plant on the east coast of Canada with enough capacity to supply up to 20% of the gas demand for New York and New England. In 2008, Repsol began an intensive exploration campaign and invested in exploring in new areas, with results that enabled the company to change its profile. Using cutting-edge technology, the company made over 30 hydrocarbon discoveries, many of which were considered to be among the largest in the world. In 2009, Petroleum Economist magazine called it the "Best energy company of the year".

==== Canary Islands ====
Following years of opposition from environmentalist groups, Spain finally gave permission in August 2014, for the company and its partners to explore prospects off the Canary Islands. In January 2015, after two months of exploration about 50 kilometers off the coasts of Fuerteventura and Lanzarote, the company said in a statement it only found small deposits that were not worth drilling thus scrapping the project.

==== Alaska ====
In 2013, Repsol and Armstrong Energy, a privately held oil and gas exploration and production company in New Mexico, discovered the Pikka field 83km west of Deadhorse, Alaska and about 10km away from Nuiqsut on the Alaska North Slope by drilling a discovery well into the Nanushuk Formation, a well they called Qugruk 3. In May 2024 Repsol and Santos Limited subsidiary Oil Search were looking to sell 20-25% of their non-operating interest in the Pikka unit, to raise funds, one month after they had asked the Alaska Oil and Gas Conservation Commission for a permit to hydraulic fracking.

=== Talisman acquisition, 2014 ===
In December 2014, Repsol announced that it would buy Canadian oil company Talisman Energy in a transaction worth about $15.1 billion Cdn ($13 billion US).

== Company name and origins ==
Logo of Repsol used from 2012 to 2025.

In 1971, the Repsol logo first appeared, as REPESA (Refinería de Petróleos de Escombreras S.A.) brand product, in the Motorcycling World Championship of that year.

Its name derives from the founding company REPESA for its visibility and easy pronunciation in different languages. In 1991, the Instituto Nacional de Hidrocarburos (INH), before the imminent demise of the state oil monopoly, set the goal to create a company of mixed public-private capital, which exploited state oil assets. When looking for a name a survey at street level was performed and the only two words that people recognized and associated with the world of oil were CAMPSA (badge of the former monopoly) and REPSOL; obviously, this last one was chosen to name the new company.

"A short, round, sonorous and catchy name was searched. As many terms of the language sink their roots in Latin, here the first letters of a small company of lubricants (Repesa) were used, and the term is completed with the star that identifies Spain in the cultures of the north. Repsol is one of the few names of companies that do not obey an acronym or joins that obsession of putting together letters of horrific names. And that was the first hit".

== Business areas ==
=== Upstream ===
Exploration and production of oil and natural gas are in charge of Repsol Exploration SA and its many subsidiaries. It is present in several countries, such as Spain, United States, Canada, Brazil, Bolivia, Colombia, Peru, Venezuela, Trinidad and Tobago, Norway, United Kingdom, Algeria, Libya, Indonesia and others.

The oil and gas exploration and production activity is Repsol's main growth driver. Repsol has become a world leader in exploration, with over 40 finds since 2008. To guarantee this activity in the long term, in 2013, Repsol incorporated 65 exploration blocks, mainly in the United States (44 blocks) and Norway (6 blocks), into its mining holdings.

Production was doubled as a result of the acquisition of Talisman Energy in 2015. As of January 2022, Repsol produces an average of 572,000 barrels of oil per day, and it has proven reserves of 1.9 billion barrels.

=== Industrial ===
==== Refining ====
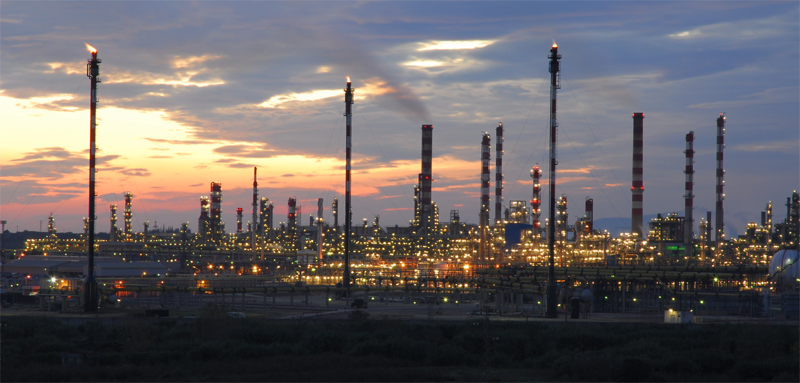
Repsol oil refinery in Tarragona.

Industrial activity involves the supply and trading of crude and products, oil refining, petroleum product marketing, distribution and marketing of Liquefied Petroleum Gas (LPG), production and marketing of chemicals and the development of new energies.

The Repsol Group owns and operates five refineries in Spain (Cartagena, A Coruña, Bilbao, Puertollano and Tarragona), and one in Peru. The combined refining capacity exceeds one million barrels per day.

In addition to products derived from oil and gas, Repsol also produces aviation biofuel from waste and biomass.

The brands Repsol, CAMPSA, and Petronor market their products through an extensive network of over 6,900 outlets, of which over 6,500 are service stations, distributed in Europe and Latin America. Repsol is one of the leading retail distributions of LPG, bottled and bulk, worldwide and is the first in Spain and Latin America.

==== Chemicals ====
The Chemicals division produces and markets a wide variety of products in over 90 countries, and it is one of the leaders of the market on the Iberian Peninsula. Its activities range from basic petrochemicals to derivatives.

Production is concentrated at three petrochemical complexes located in Spain (Puertollano and Tarragona) and Portugal (Sines), where there is a high level of integration between basic and derivatives, as well as with refining activities in the case of the Spanish facilities. Repsol also has a number of subsidiary and affiliate companies through which the company produces polyolefin compounds, chemical specialties, and synthetic rubber at special plants.

==== Trading ====
The main function of Trading is to optimize the supply and deliver to market of the Group's positions in international markets for crude oil and petroleum products (integrated supply chain). Its activity consists of:

- the supply of crude oil and products for Refining systems and other Group needs,
- the delivery to market of crude oil and associated products from its own production,
- the maritime transport of crude oil and derivative products associated with these activities,
- the management of crude oil and product hedges in the financial derivative markets.

==== Wholesale and gas trading ====
The company's activity in this area focuses on optimizing the margin from the marketing and sale of regasified LNG and natural gas. The optimization of the gas and LNG portfolio has been carried out through swap operations with third parties, along with logistic optimizations and trading in the gas system.

=== Commercial and renewables ===
==== Mobility ====
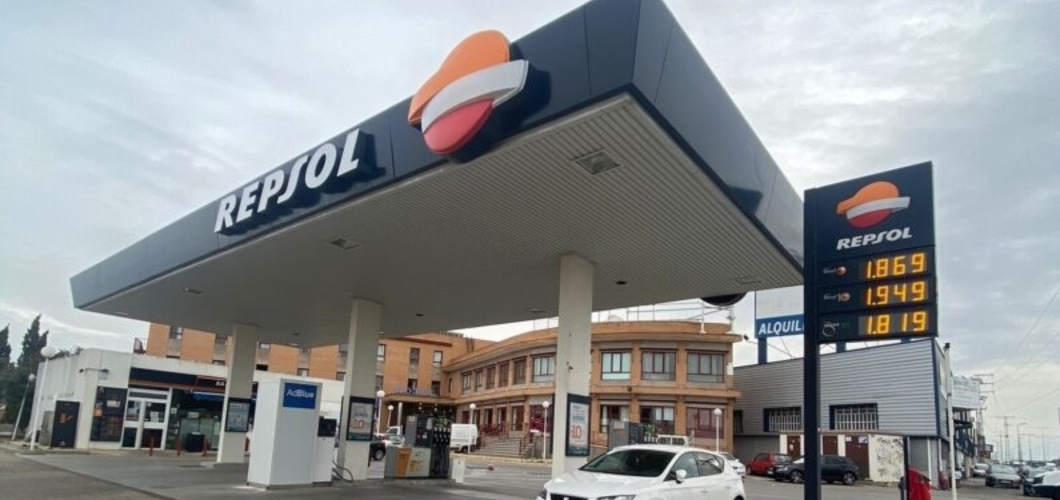
Repsol service station in Spain.

The company markets and sells oil and related products both through service stations and via direct sales channels.

On December 31, 2021, Repsol had 4,689 service stations in Spain, Portugal, Mexico, and Peru.

==== Lubricants, Aviation, Asphalts and Specialized Products ====
Production and sale of lubricants, bases for lubricants, bitumen, jet fuel, extender oils, sulfur, paraffins, and propellant gases.

==== LPG ====
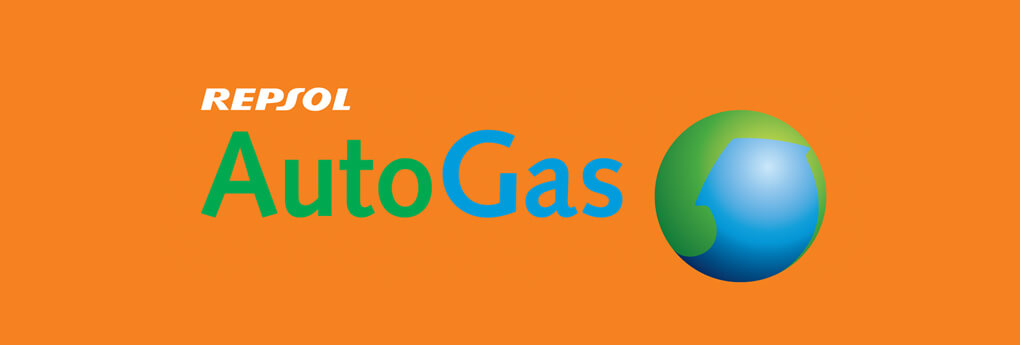
Logo of Repsol AutoGas.

In Spain and Portugal, Repsol distributes bottled Liquefied Petroleum Gas (LPG), bulk LPG, and AutoGas. In Peru, it supplies AutoGas.

==== Retail Electricity and Gas ====
Repsol provides electricity and gas in the retail sector (residential and businesses) with a base of more than 1.3 million customers throughout all of Spain.

In 2021, Repsol received the highest assurance rating, the A label, for the second consecutive year, recognizing its environmentally friendly sourcing of electricity, according to the Comisión Nacional de los Mercados y la Competencia. Repsol is the only major retail marketer in Spain, in terms of customers supplied, that guarantees 100% renewable electricity.

==== Renewables and low-carbon generation ====
Repsol is a major player in the generation of electricity in Spain. As of 31 December 2021, the total installed capacity in operation of low-carbon and renewables reaches 3,738 MW. This includes 693 MW in hydroelectric and pumping plants, 1,625 MW in combined cycle plants, 600 MW in cogeneration plants, 430 MW in wind and 390 MW in solar photovoltaic.

== Brief chronology ==
- 1948 incorporation REPESA (Refinería de Petróleos de Escombreras S.A.) created for the installation of a refinery in the Valley of Escombreras, Cartagena (Spain).
- 1981 Creation of INH: Public organization created to integrate the various companies operating in the oil and gas in which the Spanish state had a controlling interest or was the sole owner.
- 1986 Creation of the Repsol group: Its sole shareholder is the INH. Repsol brings together the companies in which the Spanish state had a controlling interest in the areas of exploration and production (old Hispanoil), refining (formerly ENPETROL), chemical and liquefied natural gas (LNG), Butane (former Butano S.A.), CAMPSA and Petronor. Repsol Chemical (Alcudia), initially a subsidiary of Repsol Petroleum, which will then be a subsidiary.
- 1989 The State (INH) began the privatization of Repsol. IPO of 26% of Repsol Capital. Repsol shares, S.A. upgraded trading on exchanges in Spain and New York.
- 1991 Natural Gas Company is created.
- 1997 The State completes the privatization of Repsol.
- On April 16, 2012, the President of Argentina, Cristina Fernandez de Kirchner announced the introduction in the Congress of a bill to "safeguard the sovereignty of Argentina hydrocarbons". This project has as main purpose the expropriation of 51% of the shares of YPF.
- On March 28, 2014, Repsol's Annual General Meeting ratified the "Convenio de Solución Amigable y Avenimiento de Expropiación" which recognises the Repsol's right to receive $5 billion as compensation for the expropriation of the 51% shareholding in YPF and YPF GAS, together with payment guarantees.
- On May 15, 2018, Repsol announced it would no longer seek growth for oil and gas.
- American energy investment company EIG acquires a 25% stake of Repsol's upstream business for US$4.8 billion.

== Expropriation of YPF ==
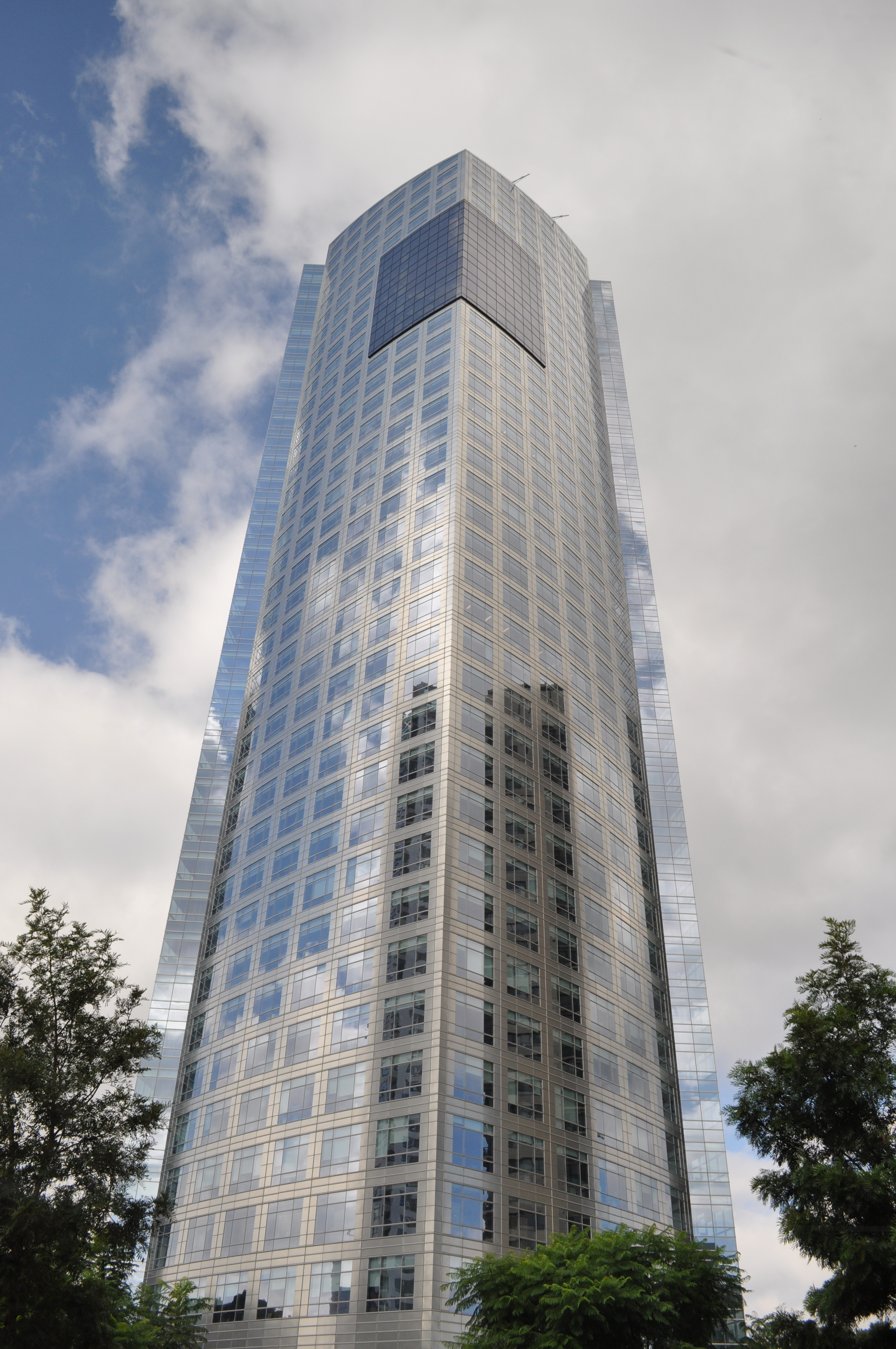
The YPF Tower in Buenos Aires.

In May 2012, the Argentine president Cristina Fernández de Kirchner, proposed the expropriation of 51% of Repsol's shares in YPF. The Republic of Argentina's Yacimientos Petrolíferos Fiscales Act that was passed that summer made officially possible the expropriation of Repsol's shares. Repsol went to various international bodies to pursue legal action directly after losing its shares of YPF. The expropriation was an attempt by the Argentine government to nationalize its oil and gas production. Results however show that the move to nationalize actually hurt oil production in Argentina. Compared to the oil production in 2011, YPF's oil production in 2012 fell by 8%, according to data from Argentina's Department of Energy.

Repsol had the backing of the EU and the US, and both powers condemned Argentina's move as expropriation. President Fernández claimed that the state would seize 51% of YPF. In June 2013, Repsol rejected a $5 billion proposal from Argentina to compensate for the 2012 expropriation. The proposal also would have given Repsol drilling rights to 6.4% of the massive Vaca Muerta shale-gas field. The board of Repsol unanimously rejected this offer, as it would have caused them to drop a $10.5 billion lawsuit that was in progress against the Argentine government. Repsol at the time owned 6.4% of YPF. On 25 February 2014, the Repsol board announced it had accepted a settlement offer from the Argentine government of an issue of Argentine bonds valued at $5 billion. The deal concluded after three months of negotiations in Buenos Aires was subject to shareholder approval. The agreement ended two years of legal wrangling and the potential for a long drawn-out legal battle. Repsol Chairman Antonio Brufau described the "friendly" settlement as "extremely positive".

== Environmental record ==
In 2011, Repsol built the world's first service station certified by BREEAM, "the leading international method for evaluating and certifying building sustainability". The construction of the station was completed under green architecture parameters, utilizing multiple recycled materials. The publication Newsweek selected Repsol as the most environmentally respectful energy company of 2012. However, recent reports of Repsol drilling in the indigenous lands of the Peruvian Amazon display a disregard for the environment. According to an Environmental Impact Assessment, Repsol's exploration of the rainforest will involve drilling at least 21 wells. Although Repsol denies it, 20 of the 21 wells fall within the land of indigenous people, who are very vulnerable to any sort of contact with foreigners.

In 2016, Repsol ranked as being among the 12th best of 92 oil, gas, and mining companies on indigenous rights in the Arctic. In 2021, Repsol was ranked no. 9 in the Arctic Environmental Responsibility Index (AERI) that covers 120 oil, gas, and mining companies involved in resource extraction north of the Arctic Circle.

Repsol's La Pampilla refinery in Peru was involved in an estimated 6,000-barrel spill off the coast of Lima, on 15 January 2022. Over 18,000 square kilometres of coastline have been affected, including the Ancón Reserved Zone, home to hundreds of endemic marine species. The Peruvian Foreign Ministry described the spill as 'the worst ecological disaster to occur in Lima'. The Peruvian Minister for the Environment has estimated that the penalties imposed on Repsol could go as high as US$33.4 million, aside from the reparations to the local population. Before the Government inspected the spill, Repsol falsely stated that the spill involved only "seven gallons". A Repsol spokeswoman stated to the Peruvian press that Repsol wasn't responsible for the spill: "we didn't cause the ecological disaster, we were unloading crude oil since the previous day. We called the Peruvian Navy, we asked them to confirm the alert on the coasts of Peru". The spokeswoman explained the mistake in informing the Government of the actual amount of spill stating that, since it happened during the night of the 15th, Repsol was unable to correctly estimate how much crude was spilled, and had to wait until the following morning to accurately analyse the situation. She also declined to say who would be responsible for the spill. The spill comes as the latest development in the botched response to the 2022 Hunga Tonga–Hunga Ha'apai eruption and tsunami in Peru, where, due to the absence of any formal warnings by the Peruvian Navy's Hydrography and Navigation Directorate, two people died. Repsol has claimed that the Navy's refusal to inform the public of the incoming waves and tsunami allowed them to continue with the unloading of crude oil, which lead to the spill.

On August 23, 2022, a judge in Peru admitted a lawsuit by Peru's Consumer Protection Agency, Indecopi, against Repsol, i.e. the case will be dealt with in court. The case would consist of a civil lawsuit seeking $3bn for environmental damage and $1.5bn for damages to locals, like fishermen.

== Sponsorship ==
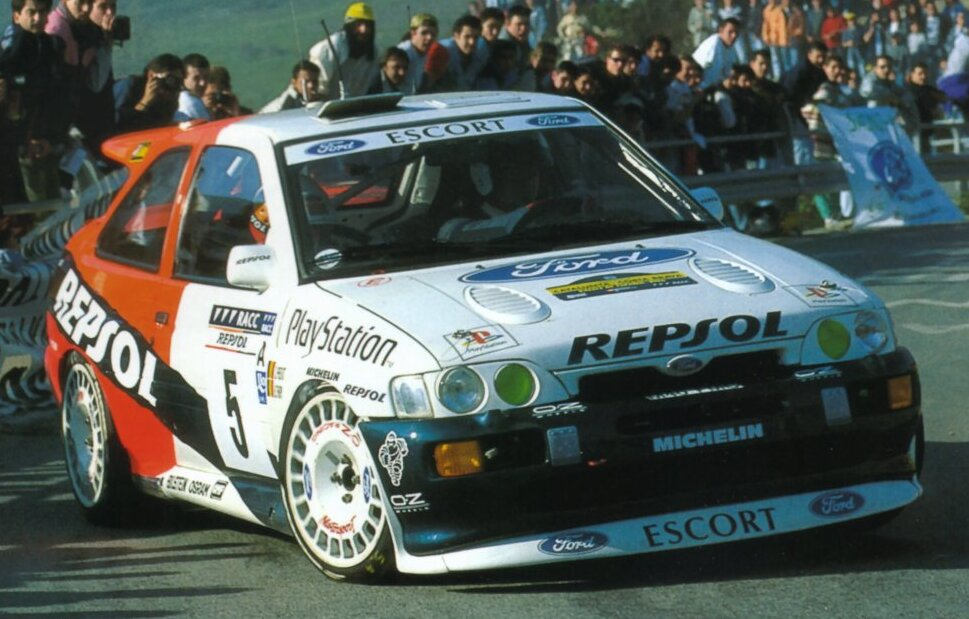
Ford Escort at the 1996 World Rally Championship

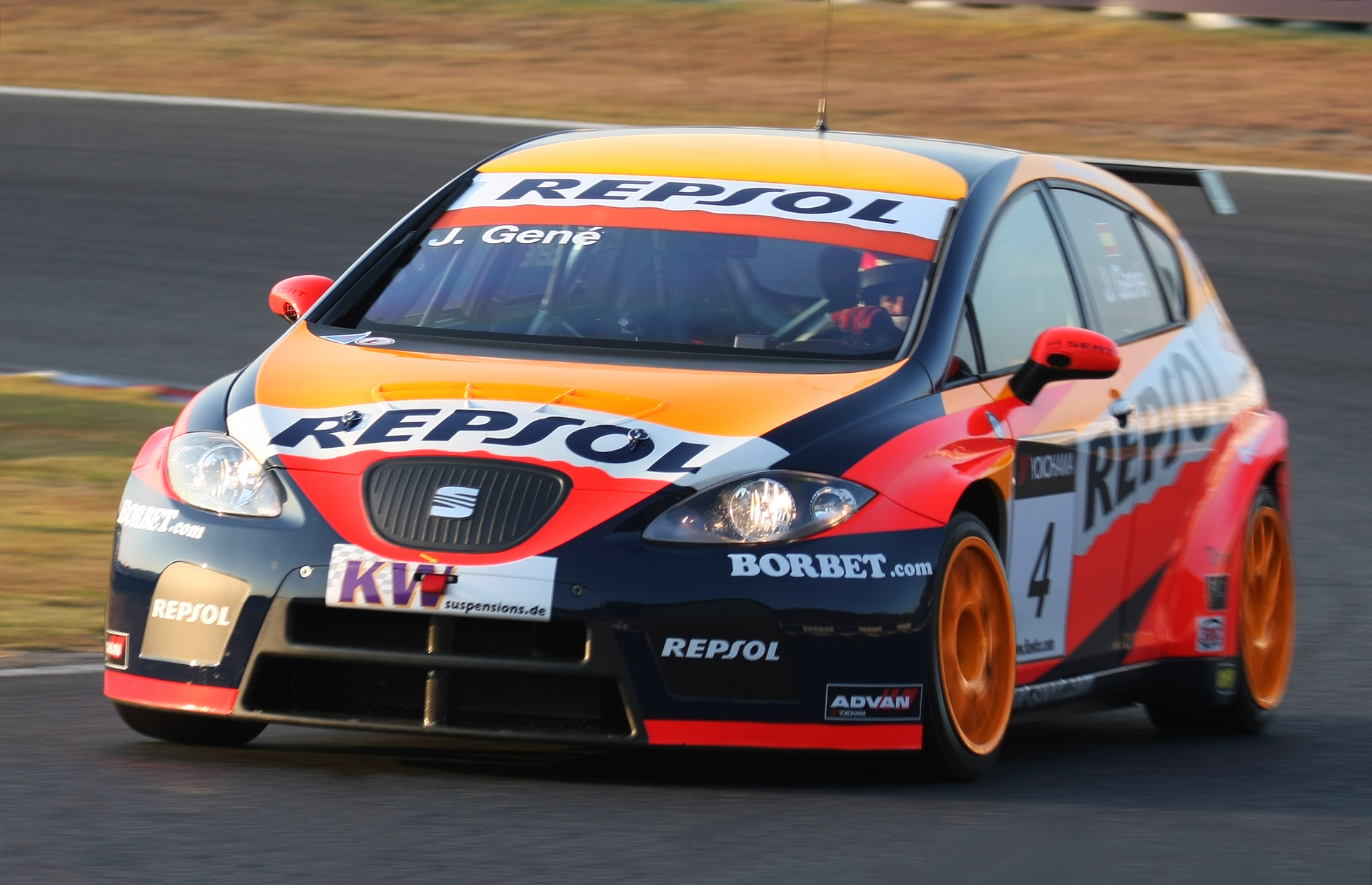
Seat León at the 2009 World Touring Car Championship

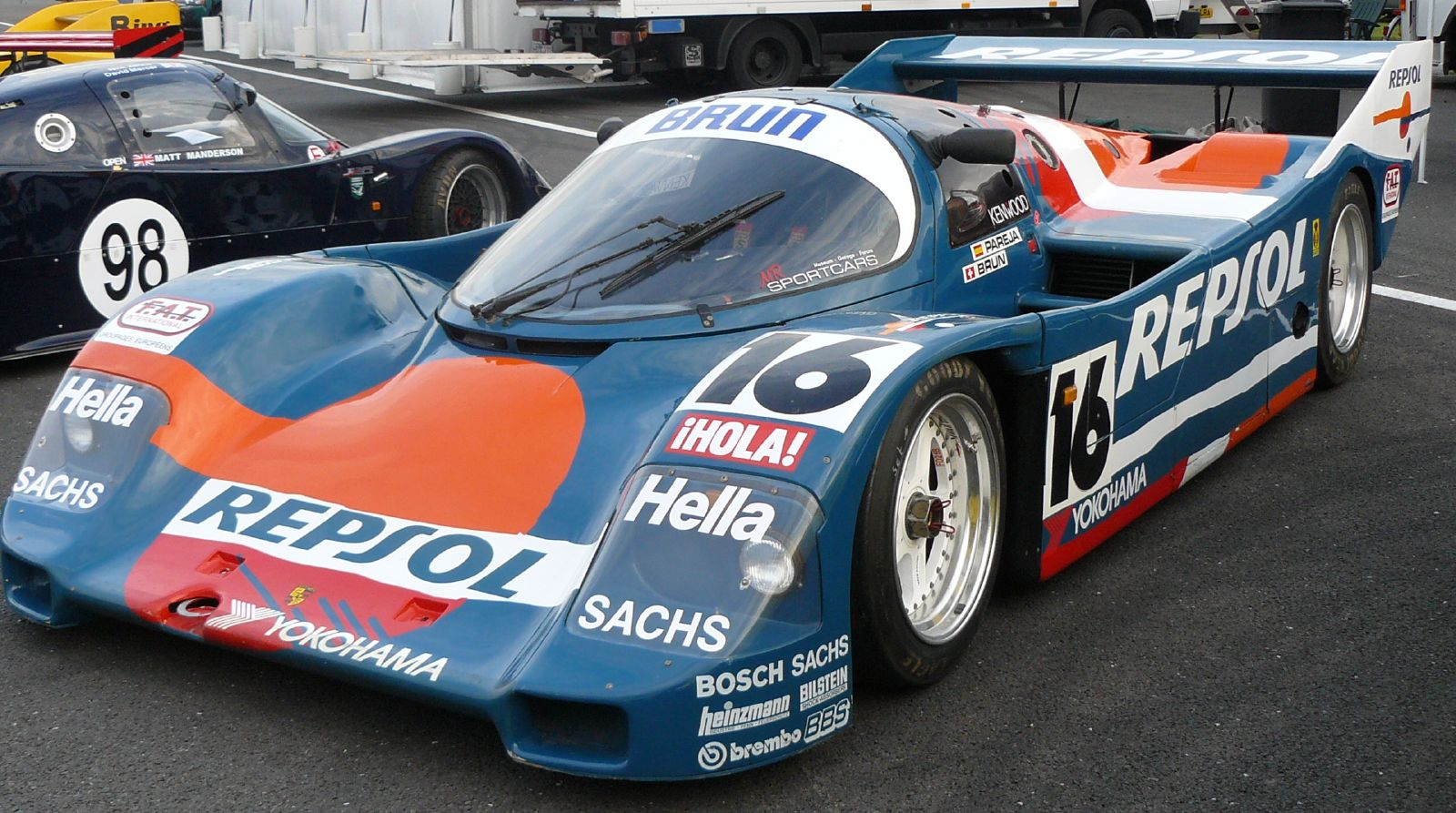
Porsche 962C of the 1990 24 Hours of Le Mans

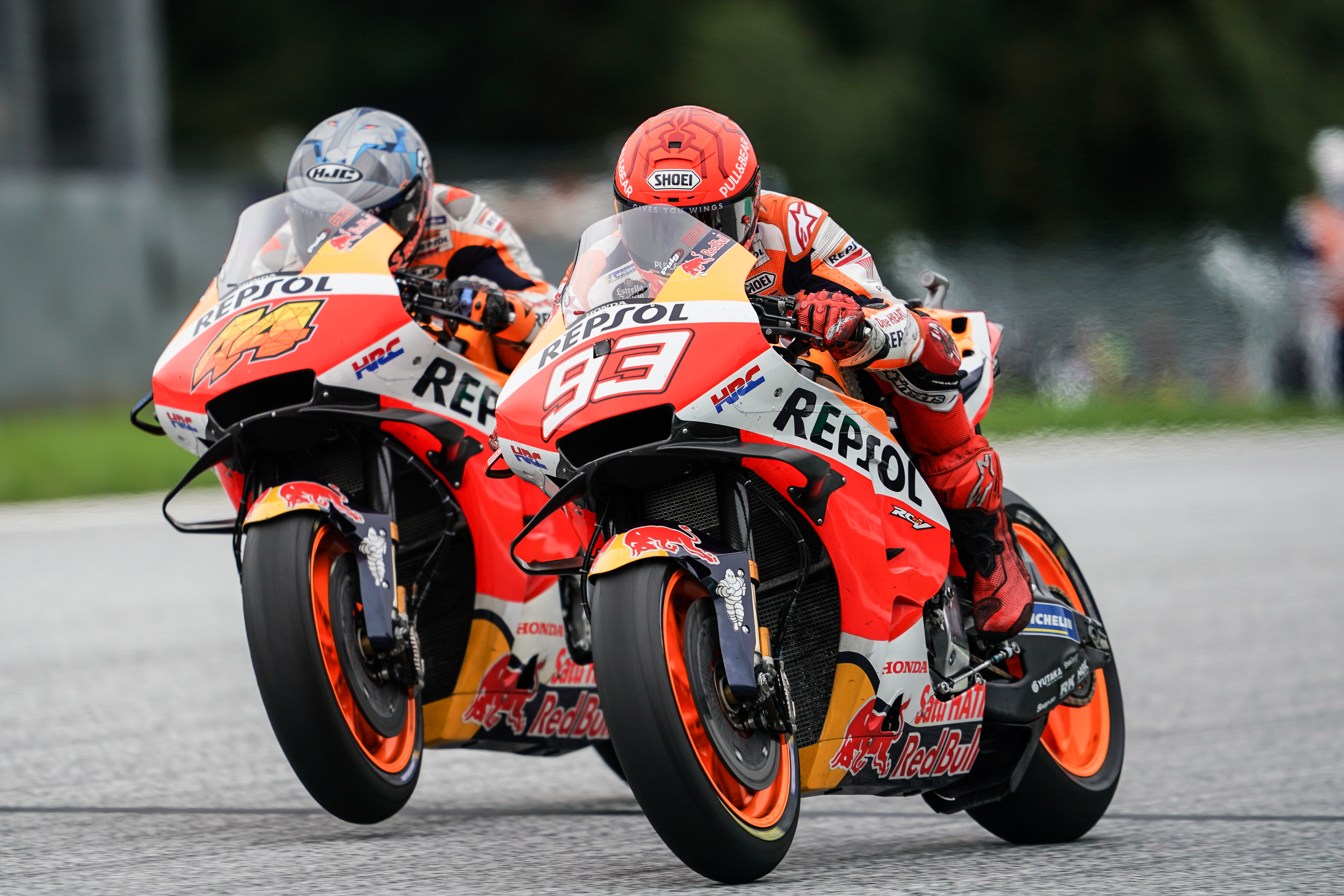
Repsol Honda team at the 2021 Styrian Grand Prix.

Repsol has been a longtime sponsor of motorsport. Spanish rally driver Carlos Sainz Sr. was a brand ambassador from 1989 to 1997, claiming two World Rally Championship titles. Repsol also had a long history of supporting the Spanish automaker SEAT in the World Rally Championship, World Touring Car Championship and others, as well as being the main sponsor for the SEAT León Supercopa racing series.

The company partnered with Honda Racing Corporation to compete in MotoGP under Repsol Honda Team from 1995 to 2024, winning 15 riders titles with Mick Doohan, Àlex Crivillé, Valentino Rossi, Nicky Hayden, Casey Stoner, and Marc Márquez. This sponsorship ended in 2025, after an unfruitful year for Repsol Honda following Marc Márquez's switch to the Ducati Corse team. Previously, it supported two-time world rally champion Carlos Sainz until 1997, Formula One teams Jordan Grand Prix in 1998, Arrows Grand Prix in 1999–2000 and Scuderia Toro Rosso from 2018, and the Mitsubishi Ralliart factory program at the Dakar Rally until 2009.

Repsol is also a main sponsor of local motorcycle racing championships in Indonesia. Repsol Motoprix is a motorcycle racing championship in Indonesia. The event is part of the broader Repsol Honda Team's presence in Indonesian motorcycle racing, highlighting their involvement in the sport at various levels, from MotoGP to local competitions like Motoprix. The MotoPrix championship has four classes: MP1 (Expert), MP2 (Novice), MP3 (Rookie), and MP4 (Beginner), each with specific engine specifications.

== See also ==
- Repsol Honda
