= Banca March =

Spanish investment bank and financial services company

Banca March, S.A.

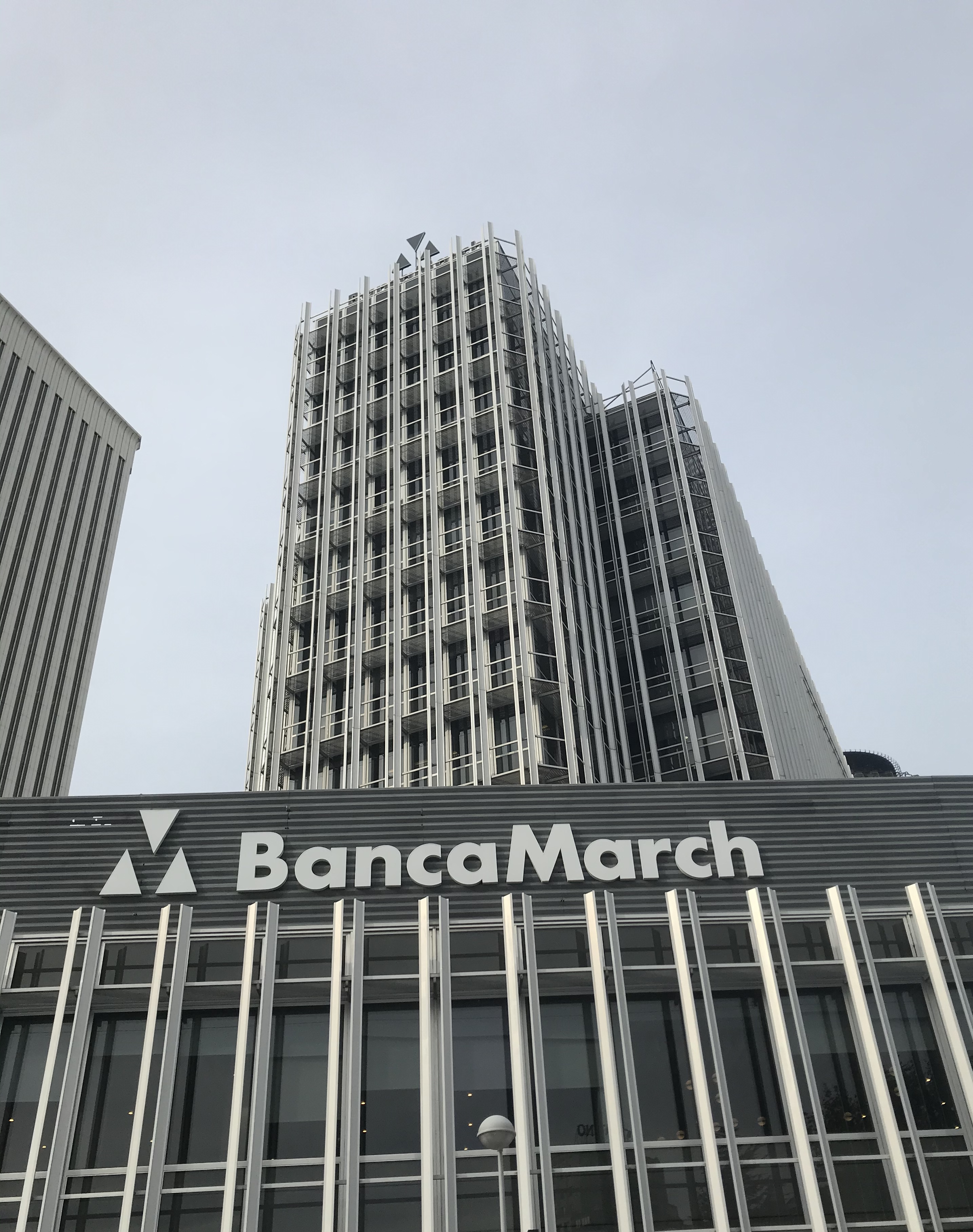
- Headquarters in Madrid, Spain
- Type: Family-owned
- Industry: Banking financial services
- Founded: 1926
- Headquarters: Av. d'Alexandre Rosselló, 8; 07002 Palma
- Area served: Spain, mainly the Balearic and Canary islands
- Key people: Juan March y de la Lastra (Chairman); José Luis Acea Rodríguez (CEO)
- Products: Private banking Retail banking Investment banking Investment management Private equity
- Revenue: ▼€236.232 million (2019)
- Net income: ▼€125.06 million (2019)
- Total assets: ▲€16.436 billion (2019)
- Number of employees: ▲1,889 (2019)
- Parent: Corporación Financiera Alba
- Website: bancamarch.es

Banca March, S.A., (/mɑːk/) is a Spanish investment bank and financial services company headquartered in Palma and Madrid.

The bank was founded in 1926 by Juan March. In the beginning, its sphere of influence was limited to Mallorca but it eventually grew to be the leading independent bank in the Balearic Islands. In 1974 it initiated an expansion onto the Spanish peninsula and in 1989 it began serious operations in the Canary Islands.

Since the beginning of the 21st century, March has continued to expand its operations in the Balearic and Canary Islands, has begun operations in the tourist destinations of Andalusia and is in the process of expanding its offices in Madrid, Barcelona, and London. The March family is a well known banking dynasty in Spain, sometimes mentioned alongside Europe's biggest banking families, the Rothschild and von Oppenheim dynasties.

The bank is remarked upon for its solvency. In 2010, March was deemed "the safest bank in Europe" by the 2010 European Union bank stress test.

== History ==
Banca March was founded in Palma, Mallorca in 1926 by Juan March Ordinas.

At first, the bank's area of influence was limited to Mallorca, progressively expanding throughout the 20th century and becoming an independent bank in all of the Balearic Islands. The main objective was to finance a part of the business activities of its founder.

In 1974 it began its expansion in the Iberian Peninsula and in 1989 a significant implantation began in the Canary Islands. In recent years, at the beginning of the 21st century, the growth of the network in the Balearic and Canary Islands has been complemented with the expansion in the areas of Andalusia and Levante, in addition to strengthening and modernizing the Madrid, Barcelona and London offices.

During the 80's, the Marches were the largest shareholders of Banco Hispanoamericano, with 5% of the equity, and they controlled a similar stake in Banco Popular Español. The government of the Spanish Socialist Workers Party (PSOE) attempted a merger of both banks with the Marches as the architects of the operation. Luis Valls-Taberner, chairman of Popular, refused outright and aborted the merger.

The Marches later negotiated with banker Claudio Boada his exit from Hispano and the purchase of Banco Urquijo, an operation that was closed in 1988 for a price of 56 billion pesetas (€336.57 million at the time). Subsequently, the Belgian financial group KBC bought Banco Urquijo from the March family for €350 million. The operation was closed in two phases: first in 1998 it took over 70% of the stake and in 2004, it bought the rest.

== Financial information ==
=== Business model ===
At present, Banca March is allegedly pursuing a deeper strategic business model mainly focused on private banking (high and ultra high-net-worth individuals), large-cap stocks and family offices.

The March Group maintains a structure that responds to the development of two main activities:

- 'Banking activity' :

Through Banca March and its related companies: March Gestión de Fondos, March Gestión de Pensiones, March Vida de Seguros y Reaseguros, March JLT Correduría de Seguros, Consulnor, 360 Corporate and Inversis.

- 'Investment activity' :

Through Corporación Financiera Alba, of which Banca March is the main shareholder. It participates in publicly listed companies such as Acerinox, Prosegur, CIE Automotive, Indra, Ebro Foods and Antevenio.

Corporación Financiera Alba is also a reference shareholder of Deyá Capital, with which it participates in unlisted companies.

The Banca March logo used until 2014

=== Key figures ===
The net income result attributed to Banca March, S.A. at 31 December 2019 was €125.06 million, 18.8% higher than the same period of the previous year.

Client banking resources increased by 5.5% and disintermediation by 32.3%, bringing the assets managed in SICAV to €2.071 billion, including Consulnor, thus making Banca March the third Spanish entity in the management of these institutions by volume. At the end of March 2014, March Gestión, Banca March's investment fund manager, had assets of €4.382 billion, which represents a growth of 58% compared to the same quarter of the previous year.

Banca March delinquency stood at 1.82% in December 2019, reaching the coverage of non-performing risks at 54.87%.

The Group's solvency ratio was 16.15% in December 2013, being 100% tier 1 capital.

During 2013, Banca March acquired 100% of Inversis Banco, thus becoming the sole shareholder.

== Corporación Financiera Alba ==
Apart from its banking activity, Banca March has a publicly listed subsidiary, Corporación Financiera Alba, co-chaired by Juan March y Delgado and his brother Carlos. Alba's shares include:

- Acerinox (19.35%)
- BME (12.06%)
- CIE Automotive (10.15%)
- Indra (10.52%)
- Ebro Foods (14%)
- Euskaltel (11%)
- Naturgy (5.36%)
- Viscofan (13.03%)
- Parques Reunidos (24.98%)
- Securitas Direct (6.14%)

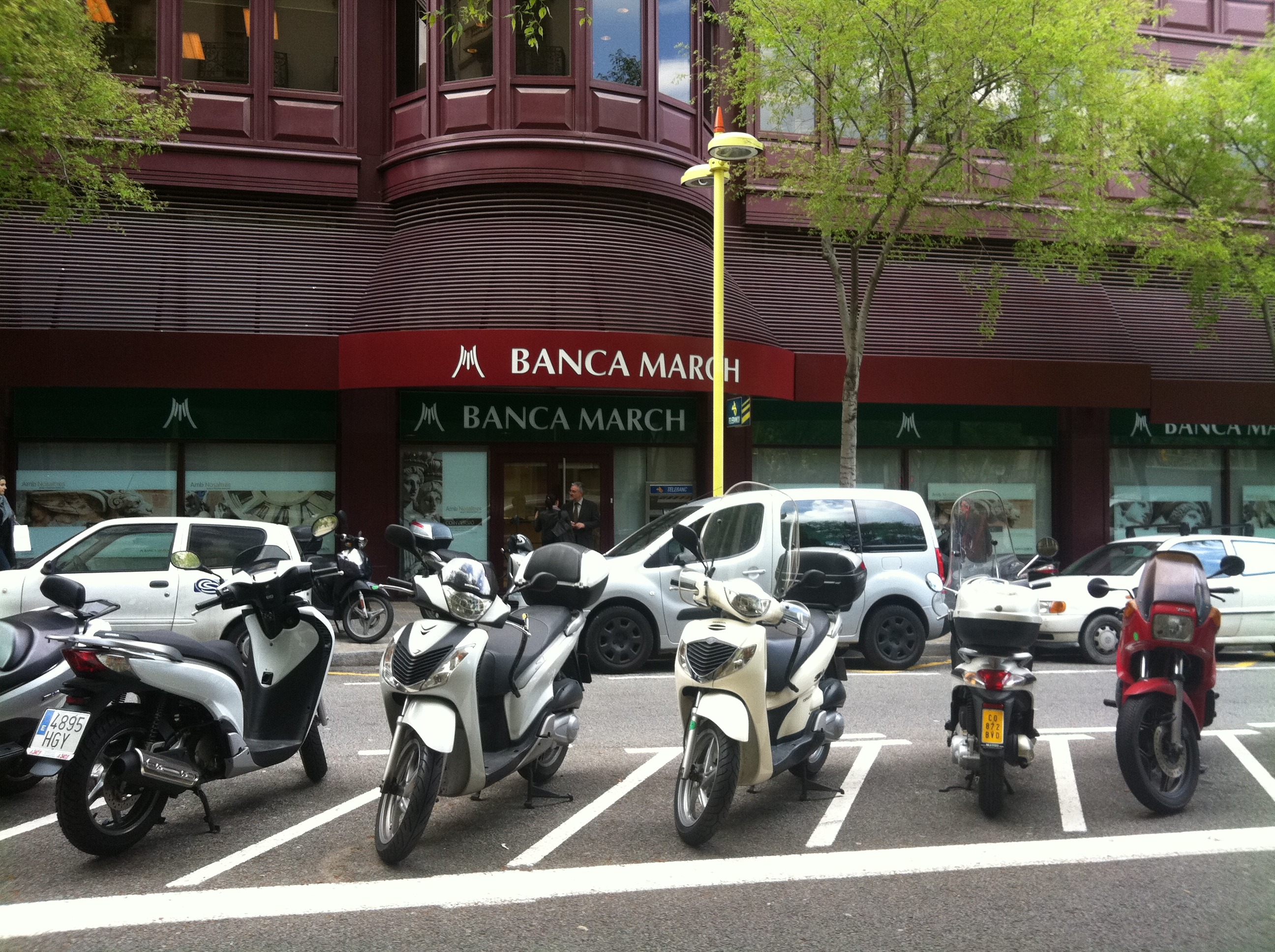
A former branch of Banca March in Barcelona, Spain

== Shareholders ==
The control of Banca March, S.A. is exercised by the four children of Juan March y Servera: Juan (33.3%), Carlos (33.3%), Gloria (16.6%) and Leonor March y Delgado (16.6%), who jointly control 100% of its share capital, without any of them doing so individually. Banca March, S.A. and its shareholders jointly control 66.7% of Corporación Financiera Alba.

== 2010 EU banking stress test exercise ==
In July 2010 Banca March came on top of the European Union banking stress test exercise in terms of Tier 1 capital ratio. According to the Financial Times:

While most scrutiny on Friday focused on the seven banks, of the 91 tested, that fell short of the 6 per cent tier one capital ratio pass mark, the exercise also shines the spotlight on the banks with the strongest capital positions.

Banca March, with a stressed tier one capital ratio of 19 per cent, is an anomaly in the Spanish financial system. Neither caja nor stock market-listed lender, March is an 84-year-old family-owned bank and equity investment group based on Mallorca.

A small branch network serves mainly wealthy clients, business families and companies looking for one-stop retail and corporate banking, asset management and financial products such as insurance and pensions. Non-performing loans account for 3.5 per cent of total assets, compared with a system average of 5.5 per cent.

As other Spanish lenders grapple with offloading multi-billion euro property portfolios acquired via foreclosures, debt-for-equity and debt-for-equity swaps, March is sitting on just €97m ($125m) of real estate. Its only exposure to sovereign debt is €105m of Spanish bonds.

== See also ==
- List of investors in Bernard L. Madoff Securities
- Sabadell Solbank
- List of banks in the euro area
- List of banks in Spain
