= María Eugenia Girón =

Spanish businesswoman

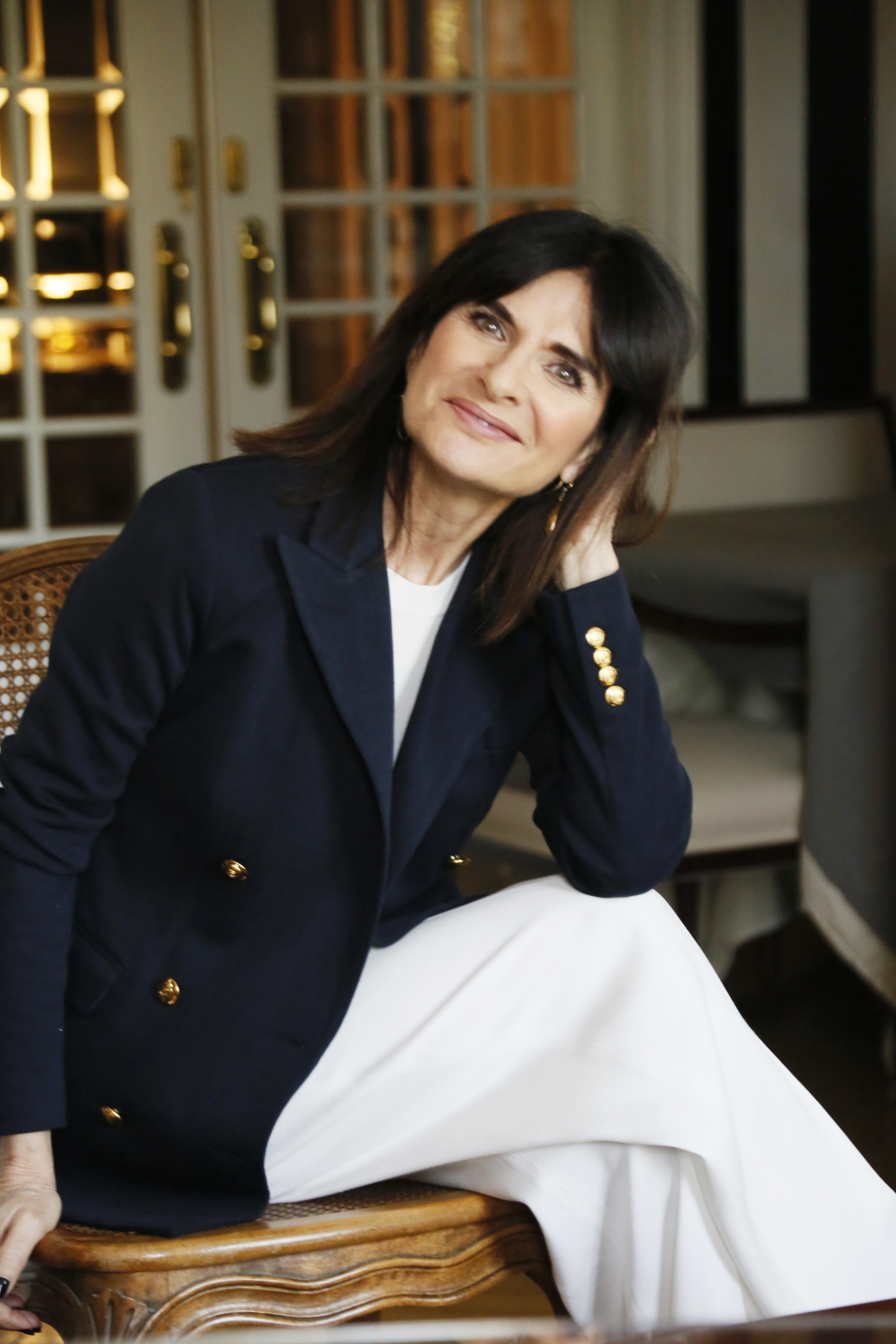
- Born: Madrid
- Partner: Jaime Estalella Carvajal
- Parents: Juan B. Girón Alegre (father); Maria Pilar Dávila Zurita (mother)
- Website: https://mariaeugeniagiron.com/

Maria Eugenia Girón is a Spanish businesswoman born in Madrid who was the chief executive officer of Carrera y Carrera jewellers from 1999 to 2006. During her career she worked for Loewe, was a consultant to the Guggenheim Museum, as well as a senior financial analyst for the First National Bank of Chicago. Recently, she is board member of several companies.

== Biography and education ==
Maria Eugenia Girón holds a Master of Business Administration at Harvard Graduate School of Business Administration Boston, MA as well as a degree in industrial engineering at the Technical School of Industrial Engineering– ICAI. Universidad Pontificia de Comillas in Madrid, Spain.

== Publications and academic contributions ==
María Eugenia Girón has published several books focused on the luxury industry, entrepreneurship, and leadership with titles like Secretos de lujo (2008): A book that explores the keys behind the creation and growth of luxury brands, Sustainable Luxury and Social Entrepreneurship: Stories from the Pioneers (2014) that explores the intersection between sustainable luxury and social entrepreneurship. Also she wrote Talento femenino y sociedad civil (2022) as co-author.

She has also written numerous academic and outreach articles, as well as collaborated on several international platforms and media.

== Professional career and achievements ==
She served as the CEO of Carrera y Carrera, a Spanish fine jewelry firm, and held executive roles at Loewe International. In addition Girón recently works as board member of companies such as CIE Automotive, Corporación Financiera Alba, Birks Group, Institute of Directors and Administrators (IC-A). and Delaviuda Company. She works as European Innovation Council jury member at European Commission.

Girón is vice-chair of Oceana, an international organization dedicated to ocean conservation. She was president of Fundación Diversidad and co-founded the Spanish chapter of Women Corporate Directors (WCD), an organization that promotes the participation of women on corporate boards.

== Awards and recognition ==
Throughout her career, María Eugenia Girón has received several awards, including the Javier Benjumea Award in 2024, recognizing her career in business and governance. In 2004, she was named Best Women Executive in Spain, and in 2022 she was honorarily included in the Top 100 Women Leaders in Spain list. She was also rewarded as 500 most influential Spanish Women.
