= Corporación Financiera Alba =

Spanish investment holding company

Logo of the company

Corporación Financiera Alba is a Spanish investment holding company founded in 1986 and listed on the Continuous Market of the Spanish stock exchanges.

The company is part of the March Group, one of Spain's leading private family-owned business and financial groups, which also includes Banca March and the Juan March Foundation.

As of March 31, 2021, Corporación Financiera Alba's net asset value amounted to 4609 million euros.

== History ==
Corporación Financiera Alba has its origins in Cementos Alba, a Spanish cement company controlled by the March Group, which began manufacturing cement in the 1950s. In 1986, Hornos Ibéricos, also a cement company whose majority shareholder was the Holderbank group (now Holcim Ltd), acquired its cement plants and concrete subsidiaries.

As a result of the sale of these industrial assets, Cementos Alba changed its name to Corporación Financiera Alba and used the proceeds from the divestment to become a financial holding company with a diversified portfolio of holdings in industrial and service companies.

Some of Corporación Financiera Alba's most representative investments, excluding the current ones, have been:

- Airtel, later Vodafone
- Banco Urquijo
- Carrefour
- Cerveza San Miguel
- Ginés Navarro, later ACS
- Uralita Group
- Pryca hypermarkets
- Media Planning Group, later Havas
- Simago
- PRISA TV

== Investment areas ==
In accordance with its bylaws, Corporación Financiera Alba's investments are not restricted by geographic area, sector or type of financial asset. At present, its investments can be grouped into three categories:

Area of investment	% on Alba's assets (a 31/12/2019)
Holdings in listed companies	70,7%
Growth capital (non-listed companies)	21,2%
Real estate assets	8,1%

== Holdings in listed companies ==
The companies in Corporación Financiera Alba are Spanish companies that derive a substantial part of their revenues from their international activities. Its shareholdings are always minority stakes but are significant enough to give it access to the management bodies of the companies in which it invests.

Listed companies in which Corporación Financiera Alba is a shareholder:

Society	Participation
Global Dominion Access, S.A.	5%
CIE Automotive, S.A.	12,73%
Viscofan, S.A.	13%
Ebro Foods, S.A.	14%
Acerinox, S.A.	19,4%
Naturgy Energy Group, S.A.	5,4%
Technoprobe	5,3%
Befesa	5,1%

== Development capital (unlisted companies) ==
Corporación Financiera Alba managed -until January 2022- several investments through the private equity company Deyá Capital (62.5% owned by Alba), which has now been dissolved.

The holding company's investment portfolio includes:

Society	Participation
in-Store Media	18,9%
Monbake	3,7%
Satlink	28,1%
Telepizza	3,3%
Alvic	7,76%
Nuadi	37,4%
Preving	24,8%
Verisure (direct investment)	6,25%
Atlantic Aviation	12%
ERM Worldwide Group Limited	14%
Parques Reunidos Servicios Centrales, S.A.	24,98%

== Real estate assets ==
Corporación Financiera Alba's real estate investments consist primarily of office buildings located in prime areas in the center and outskirts of Madrid and Barcelona, with a total surface area of more than 80,000 m².

The Company focuses on operating its own properties on a rental basis.

== Significant shareholders ==
Shareholder	% Participation
Banca March	15.022%
Juan March Delgado	18.726%
Gloria March Delgado	3.700%
Catalina March Juan	4.270%
Juan March de la Lastra (counselor)	7.084%
Carlos March Delgado (counselor)	19.25%
Juan March Juan (counselor)	4.454%

Source: CNMV (January 2020)

== Board of directors ==
Position	Name of Director
Chairman	Carlos March Delgado
Vice President	Juan March de la Lastra
Chief Executive Officer	Santos Martínez-Conde Gutiérrez-Barquín
Coordinating Director	José Domingo de Ampuero y Osma
Board Member	Ramón Carné Casas
Board Member	María Eugenia Girón Dávila
Board Member	María Luisa Guibert Ucín
Board Member	Ana María Plaza Arregui
Board Member	Claudia Pickholz
Board Member	Antón Pradera Jáuregui
Secretary-Counselor	José Ramón del Caño Palop
