= Uralita Group =

Former Spanish business group producing building materials

Grupo Uralita (Uralita Group)
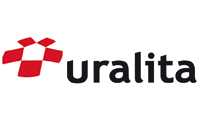
- Company type: Public
- Traded as: BMAD: URA
- Industry: General Building Materials
- Founded: 1907
- Headquarters: Madrid, Spain
- Products: Building Insulation, Drywall, Gypsum, Roofing, Piping
- Revenue: €1,094.9 million (2007)
- Number of employees: 4,059 (2007-12-31)
- Website: www.uralita.com

Uralita is a Spanish construction materials multinational enterprise, founded in 1907 as Roviralta y Cía. Uralita produces insulation, gypsum, roofing and piping systems.

It became associated in Spain to its fiber cement products, to the point that uralita is a common name for (asbestos) fiber cement in Spain of any brand.

In 1982 he acquired the Bruguer paint brand. Four years later, the AkzoNobel company — then called Akzo Nobel Coatings — acquired the entire paint division of Uralita, called Industrias Procolor, thus passing Bruguer into the hands of the Dutch company.

In 2008, Uralita's sales reached, 1007 million euros, out of which more than 55% was made outside Spain. Uralita has its corporate offices in Madrid. On December 31, 2008, it possessed a personnel of 4006 employees and 41 factories in operation in Europe, and two under construction.

In July 2010, Spanish courts ordered Uralita to pay €3.9 million compensation to people who had lived near its Barcelona factory. The newspaper El País reported that this is the first time that a company has been ordered to compensate residents (as opposed to employees) for asbestos exposure.

In 2015, it changed its name to COEMAC (Corporación Empresarial de Materiales de Construcción, "Business corporation of building materials").

In June 2020 the company enters bankruptcy. The board of directors of COEMAC S.A. informs of the appointment and acceptance of the position of Insolvency Administrator by Barrilero y Zubizarreta Insolvency, A.I.E. and the authorization granted by the latter to delay the legal obligation to prepare the annual accounts for the 2019 financial year until the month following the presentation of the inventory and list of creditors.

== See also ==
- Juan March – Spanish businessman
