= Sainghin-en-Mélantois =

- Commune
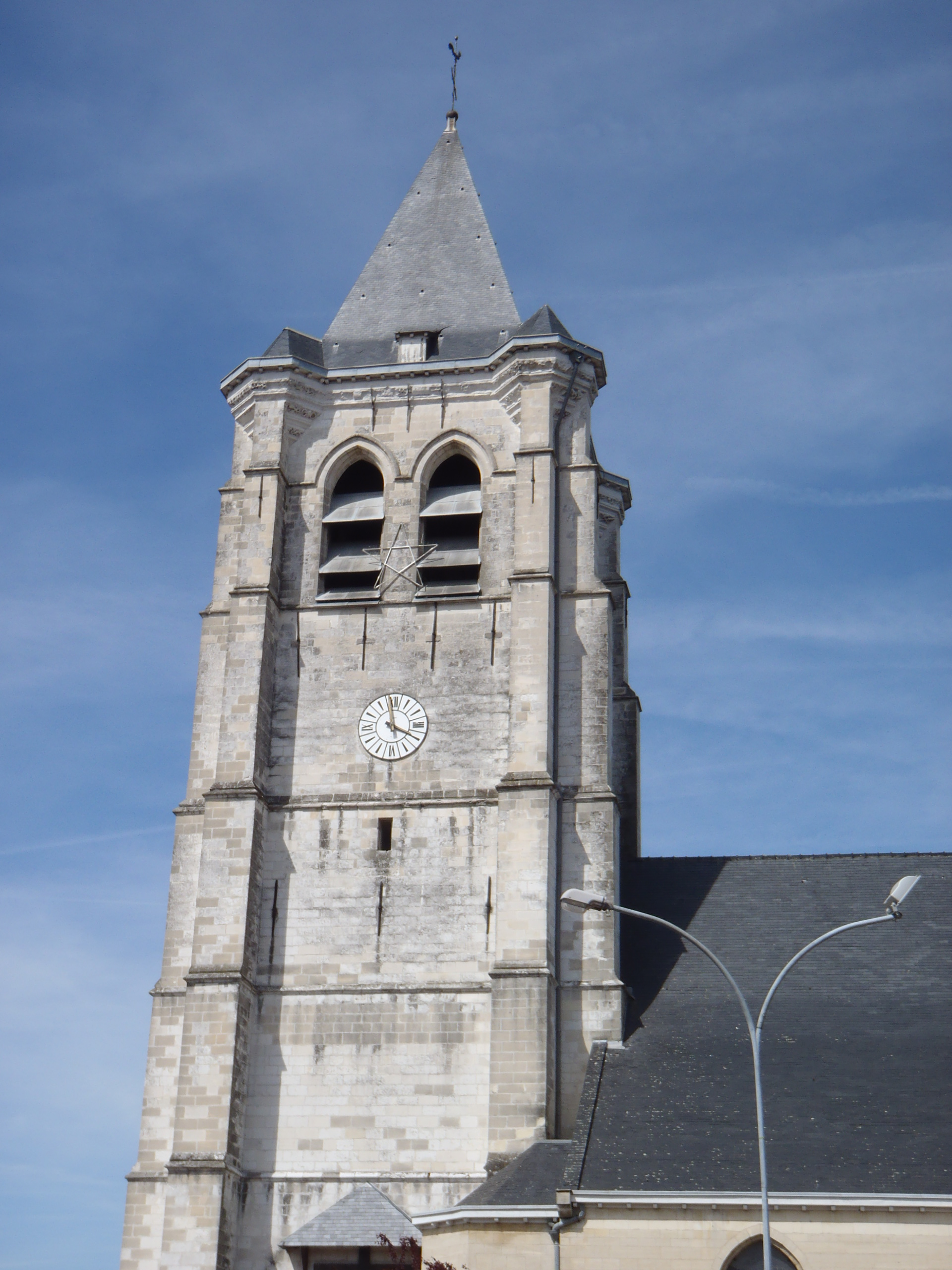
- The church in Sainghin-en-Mélantois

- Coat of arms
- Location of Sainghin-en-Mélantois
- Location within France Location within Hauts-de-France
- Coordinates: 50°35′16″N 3°10′06″E
- Country: France
- Region: Hauts-de-France
- Department: Nord
- Arrondissement: Lille
- Canton: Templeuve-en-Pévèle
- Intercommunality: Métropole Européenne de Lille

Government
  - Mayor (2020–2026): Jacques Ducrocq
- Area^{1}: 10.48 km^{2} (4.05 sq mi)
- Elevation: 35 m (115 ft)
- Highest elevation: 52 m (171 ft)
- Lowest elevation: 25 m (82 ft)
- Population (2023): 2,840
  - Density: 271/km^{2} (702/sq mi)
- Time zone: UTC+01:00 (CET)
  - Summer (DST): UTC+02:00 (CEST)
- INSEE/Postal code: 59523 /59262
- ^{1} French Land Register data, which excludes lakes, ponds, glaciers > 1 km^{2} (0.386 sq mi or 247 acres) and river estuaries.

Sainghin-en-Mélantois (French pronunciation: [sɛ̃ɡɛ̃ ɑ̃ melɑ̃twa], lit. 'Sainghin in Mélantois'; Dutch: Singem) is a commune in the Nord department in northern France. It is part of the Métropole Européenne de Lille.

== Population ==
Historical population
Year	Pop.	±% p.a.
1968	1,724	—
1975	1,901	+1.41%
1982	2,396	+3.36%
1990	2,562	+0.84%
1999	2,544	−0.08%
2007	2,305	−1.23%
2012	2,524	+1.83%
2017	2,760	+1.80%
2023	2,840	+0.48%
Source: INSEE

== Heraldry ==
Arms of Sainghin-en-Mélantois	The arms of Sainghin-en-Mélantois are blazoned : Or, a canton gules. (Anstaing and Sainghin-en-Mélantois use the same arms.)

== Economy ==
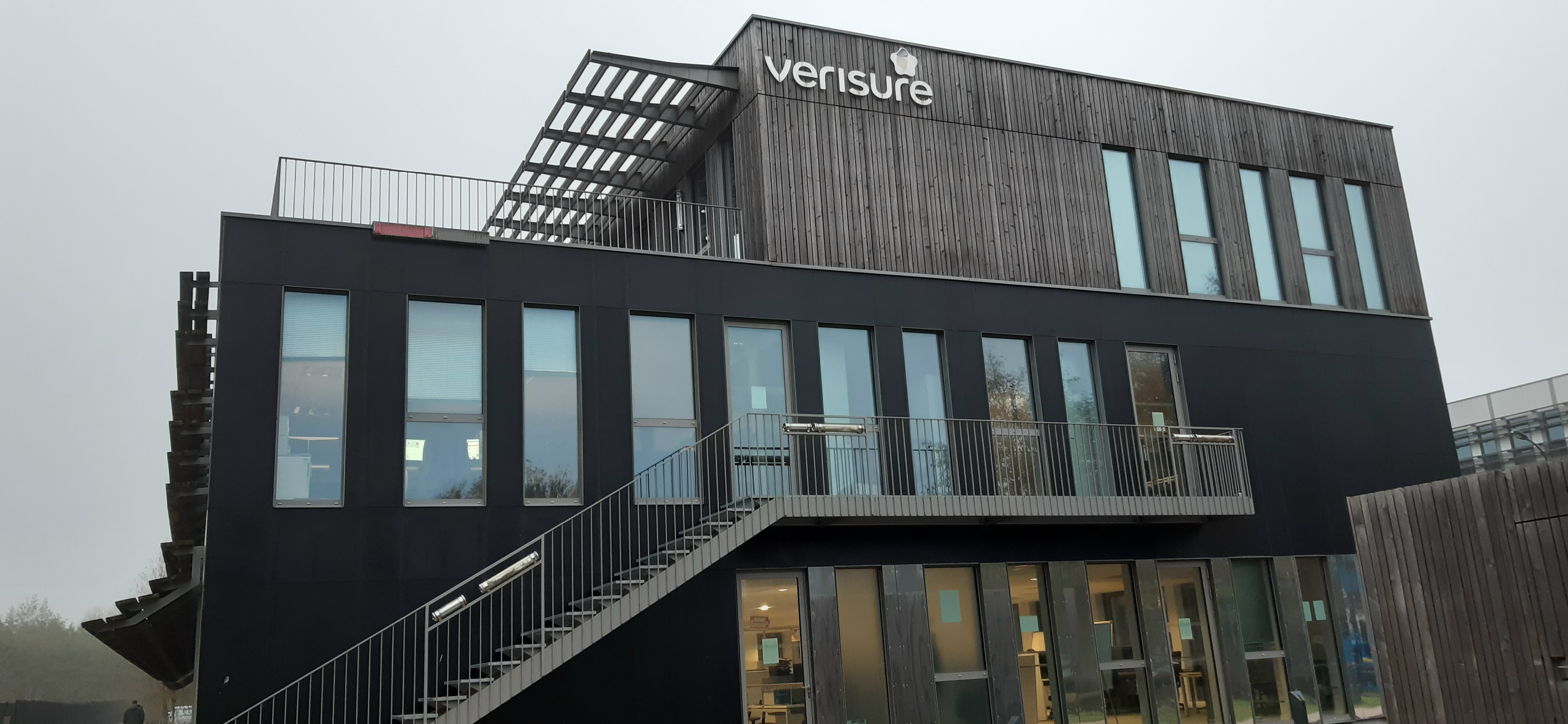
Verisure building at Sainghin in 2020.

Part of the Lesquin Regional Transport Center is located in the municipality, as is the Haute-Borne business park. The company Verisure opened a building there in 2014, employing about 300 people. A camping camp, the Grand Sart, operates in the commune.

== See also ==
- Communes of the Nord department
