= VDM Metals =

German manufacturer

VDM Metals Holding
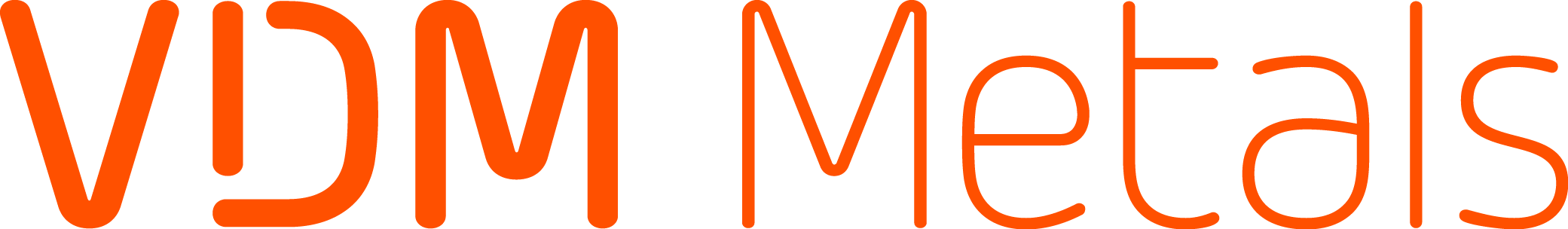
- Formerly: ThyssenKrupp VDM, Outokumpu VDM
- Industry: Stainless steel
- Predecessor: Aktiengesellschaft für Metallindustrie vormals Gustav Richter
- Founded: 1930
- Key people: Niclas Müller (CEO)
- Number of employees: 2,000
- Parent: Acerinox
- Website: www.vdm-metals.com

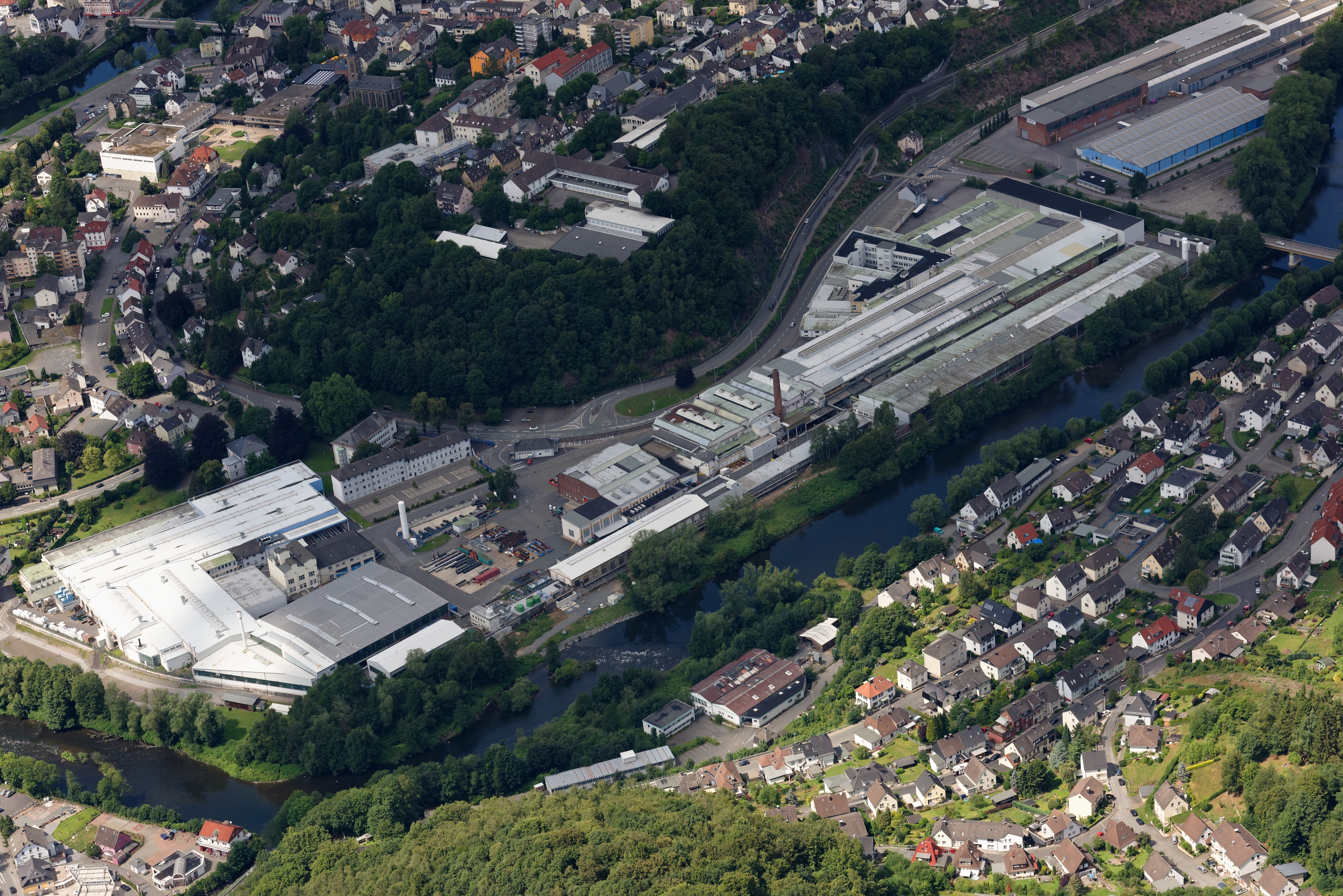
Headquarters in Werdohl, Germany

VDM Metals Group (formerly Vereinigte Deutsche Metallwerke) based in Werdohl, Germany, is a manufacturer of corrosion-resistant, heat-resistant and high-temperature nickel alloys, cobalt and zirconium alloys as well as high-alloyed special stainless steels. These materials are used in the chemical process industry, the oil and gas industry, aerospace, automotive and electronics / electrical engineering. VDM Metals operates production sites in Germany (Altena, Siegen, Unna and Werdohl) and the United States (Florham Park, NJ, and Reno, NV). The company employs about 2,000 people worldwide.

== History ==
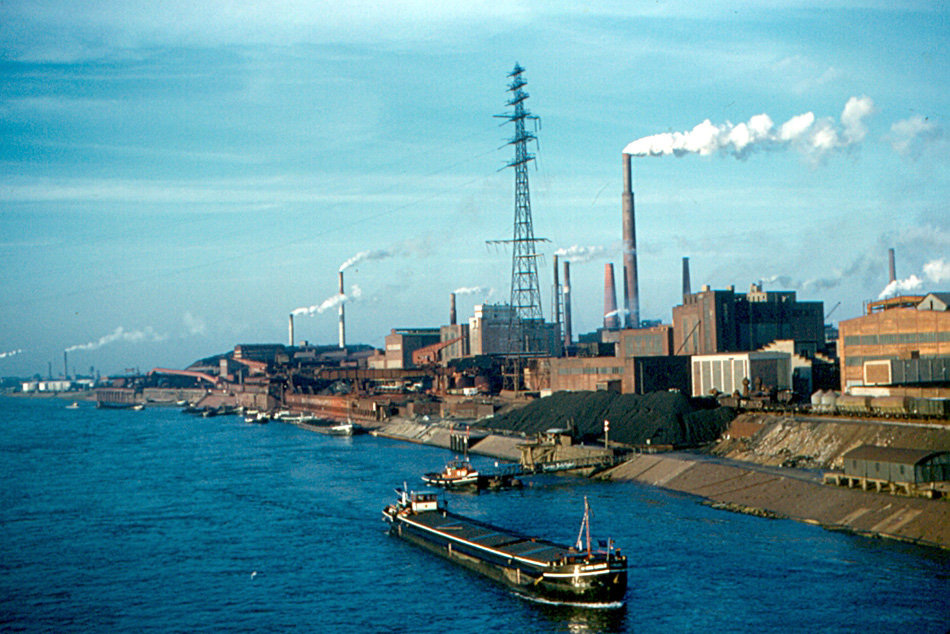
Vereinigte Deutsche Metallwerke, former plant in Duisburg, Germany, near the Rhine River (picture taken in the 1960s)

The original Vereinigte Deutsche Metallwerke AG (VDM) was founded in 1930 by the takeover of Heddernheimer Kupferwerk and Süddeutsche Kabelwerk AG in Frankfurt by Berg-Heckmann-Selve AG in Altena. The merger took place on the initiative of Metallgesellschaft, which was the main shareholder of Heddernheimer Kupferwerke since 1893 and also took over the majority of the new corporate group. The global economic crisis had forced a consolidation of previously competing companies.

The new company had a share capital of 30 million Reichsmark and had branches and manufacturing facilities in Heddernheim, Gustavsburg, Mannheim, Nuremberg, Cologne and in Altena, Werdohl and Duisburg. The group's companies remained independent under their previous name (e. g. Heddernheimer Kupferwerk GmbH), but the production program was redistributed by material group to the individual plants. In March 1934, VDM moved its headquarters to Frankfurt am Main. The incipient rearmament of the Wehrmacht skyrocketed the demand for light metal products. By 1939, the number of employees at VDM rose to 21,000, mainly due to the production of variable pitch propellers for aircraft of the Luftwaffe.

=== After 1945 ===
Because of the great importance of the VDM for the war economy, almost all buildings and factories were heavily destroyed in the air raids on Frankfurt am Main during the Second World War. At the end of the war, the production collapsed completely, all works were shut down at the direction of the Allies and partly dismantled. It was not until 1946, under the leadership of Wilhelm Kirmser, that the gradual reconstruction and transition to civilian production began.

In the early 1950s, VDM became the world's largest manufacturer and distributor of raw, semi-finished and finished non-ferrous metals and alloys. The upswing reached its peak in the financial year 1960/61. Thereafter, the company continuously lost market share.

=== The crisis years after 1966 ===
Already for 1966/67 no dividend could be paid to shareholders. A major cause of the difficulties was the fragmented corporate structure of six separate companies, which did not allow a consistent strategy and investment.

In 1969, the plant in Cologne was shut down and the remaining works were combined into seven business units:

- Copper and copper alloys
- Conducting materials
- Prefabricated parts
- Nickel and special materials
- Light metal
- Plastics processing
- Packaging solutions

Despite the restructuring and some acquisitions in the 1970s, sales continued to decline. The company reacted with rationalization measures, a reorientation of the production strategy, the sale of individual company shares and the closure of unprofitable production units and plants. This reduced the number of employees from 14,200 (1970) to 6,700 in 1979. After a dramatic deterioration of the results in the financial year 1980/81, the parent plant in Frankfurt-Heddernheim was closed after 129 years on 31 March 1982.

At this point in time, only the plants of the business area nickel (Altena, Unna and Werdohl) were still productive. In the following years, VDM gradually separated from all remaining production facilities and changed its name to MG Vermögensverwaltung AG in 1988.

=== Post-1988 history ===
In 1988 the German steelmaker Krupp took over one third, one year later 100 percent of the shares in the VDM Nickel Technologie AG. This division was formed from the merger of the Werdohl and Altena plants into the business area nickel in 1974. In the following years Krupp VDM - as the company was called - initially took over Precision Rolled Products (PRP) with production sites in New Jersey and Nevada and, on 1 October 2009, the activities of the sister company ThyssenKrupp Titanium. From then on, VDM became part of the ThyssenKrupp stainless steel division and operated under the name ThyssenKrupp VDM until 2012.

Outokumpu interlude

Following the sale of the stainless steel division of ThyssenKrupp to Outokumpu in December 2012, VDM temporarily traded under the name Outokumpu VDM. At the end of November 2013 it was announced that VDM would be re-integrated into the ThyssenKrupp Group. Since 1 March 2014, VDM had once again been part of the ThyssenKrupp Group and has since been trading under the independent name of VDM Metals.

Goldberg years

In April 2015, ThyssenKrupp announced the sale of the VDM Group to the financial investor Lindsay Goldberg. On 1 August 2015, the sale was completed.

Acerinox ownership

In November 2019, the Spanish stainless steel producer Acerinox announced the signing of a share-purchase-agreement to acquire VDM Metals. After approval through the competent antitrust authorities the deal was closed in March 2020.

== Inventions and material developments ==
=== Alloy C-264 ===
Alloy C-264 is a superalloy developed by VDM Metals and launched in 2018. In addition to the alloying element nickel, the alloy contains 25 percent chromium, 20 percent cobalt, about 5.5 percent molybdenum. 1.1 percent aluminum, and 1.7 percent titanium. Various tests have shown that the material in the solution-annealed and hardened condition achieves higher hardness values and lower creep rates than, for example, Alloy C-263 (material number 2.4650, UNS N07263). The application temperature is up to 900 °C (1,650 °F).

=== Alloy 699 XA ===
In June 2018, a nickel base alloy with 29 percent chromium and 2 percent aluminum was introduced, which is characterized in particular by its metal dusting resistance. The material has the material number 2.4842 or UNS N06699.
