= Juan March =

Spanish businessman

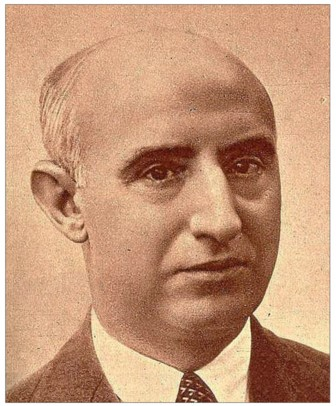
- Juan March Ordinas (circa 1931), photo published by Estampa magazine.
- Born: Juan March Ordinas; 4 October 1880; Santa Margalida, Spain
- Died: 10 March 1962 (aged 81); Madrid, Spain
- Spouse: Leonor Servera
- Children: Juan March y Servera; Bartolomé March y Servera

Juan Alberto March Ordinas [xwam maɾk] (4 October 1880 – 10 March 1962) was a Spanish business magnate, arms and tobacco smuggler, banker and philanthropist.

Closely associated with the Nationalist side during and after the Spanish Civil War, March was the wealthiest man in Spain and the sixth richest in the world. Throughout his life, he accumulated labels such as "the Rockefeller of Spain" or "the last pirate of the Mediterranean". At his death in 1961, Time called him "the Iberian Croesus".

During the Mediterranean Theatre of World War I, March was involved in an international affair after he gave supplies to a fleet of submarines of the Austro-Hungarian navy on his island of Cabrera. This action cost him with the expropriation of the island by the Government of Spain acting on behalf of Winston Churchill, at the time First Lord of the Admiralty. In 1916, he founded Trasmediterránea, an important shipping company that strengthened March's maritime outreach. He gained political protection from Miguel Primo de Rivera and established Banca March to finance part of his business ventures, including Franco's coup d'état and most of the Nationalist effort. For a short period of the Second Republic, he was jailed due to financial irregularities and illegal activities, including tobacco and arms trafficking. He managed to escape prison by bribing a Civil Guard and fleeing to Gibraltar.

In 1955, he set up his eponymous foundation of philanthropy and sciences, similar to the Rockefeller or Carnegie foundations. Around the same time, an elderly March uttered his famous "I am so rich, that I do not even know how rich I am". He died in March 1961 from sustained injuries caused by a road accident in Madrid.

The March family under his patriarchy had a strong influence in the financial, social and cultural aspects of European affairs in the 20th century, and it played an almost equally important role as the Rothschild family. Today, the Marches are among the richest in Spain, reported to be worth over US$5 billion.

== Biography ==
Juan March Ordinas was born on 4 October 1880 in Santa Margalida, on the island of Mallorca. Born into a humble family of peasants in Mallorca, he was expelled from school at an early age and began helping his father with his pig farming business while smuggling tobacco from Spanish Morocco. During World War I, he supplied goods to both sides by evading the Allied blockade of the Central Powers and the German U-boats. His power and influence increased under different Spanish governments during the reign of King Alfonso XIII. In 1926, he created the Banca March in Mallorca.

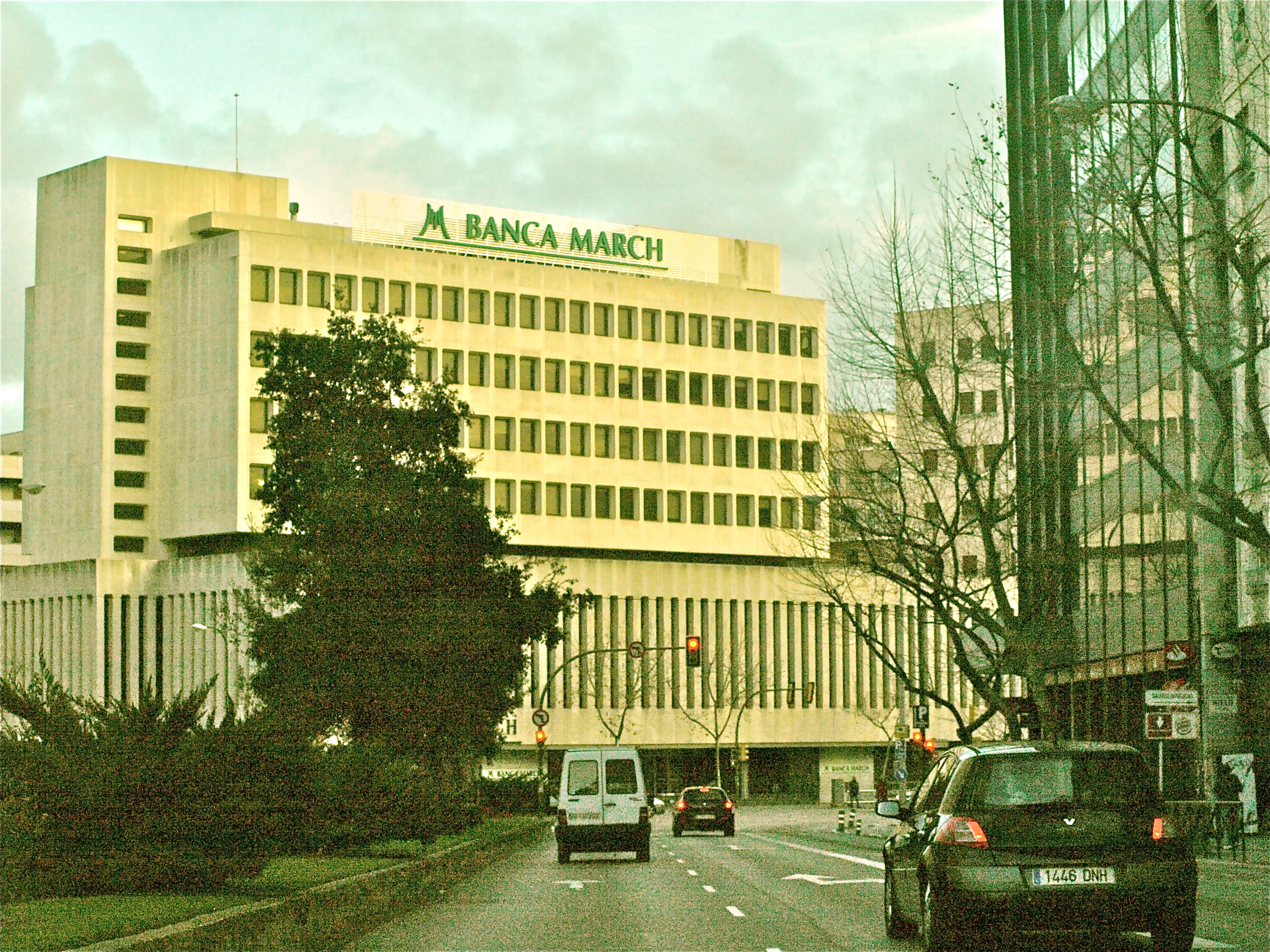
Offices of Banca March in Mallorca, Spain

When the monarchy was replaced by the Second Spanish Republic in 1931, March lost his influence, and he was convicted and imprisoned for his illegal dealings. He escaped from prison, and fled to Gibraltar where his influence with the British government protected him against extradition.

March was an important backer of the 1936 military rebellion against the Republic that led to the Spanish Civil War. He arranged Francisco Franco's flight from the Canary Islands to Spanish Morocco, brought the colonial troops there into the rebellion and personally financed the Italian airlift of those troops to southern Spain.

With the Nationalist victory in 1939, March regained more than his former influence and was greatly favoured in Francoist Spain. During World War II, the Allies employed him to keep Spain from joining the Axis. According to recently declassified documents, in 1941 the British government gave him US$10,000,000 to influence the top Spanish generals.

In 1944, March became a supporter of the claim of Don Juan de Borbón, who had now supported the Allies, to the Spanish throne. He also owned newspapers (La Libertad) and funded political parties. After World War II, he was the seventh-richest man in the world. In 1955, he established the Juan March Foundation to support the arts, music, and social sciences.

March amassed one of the greatest 20th century art collections. At a young age, he started buying books and manuscripts. Later, he collected 18th century French furniture, and Baroque, Impressionist, Modern, and contemporary art, including works of Murillo, Goya, Velázquez, Picasso, Monet, Van Gogh, Miró, Kandinsky, Brâncuși, Léger, Dalí, Fontana, Rothko, Klein, Francis Bacon, and many others. The March family collection is one of the most important in the world, and is reported to be worth over 1 billion USD.

== Family ==
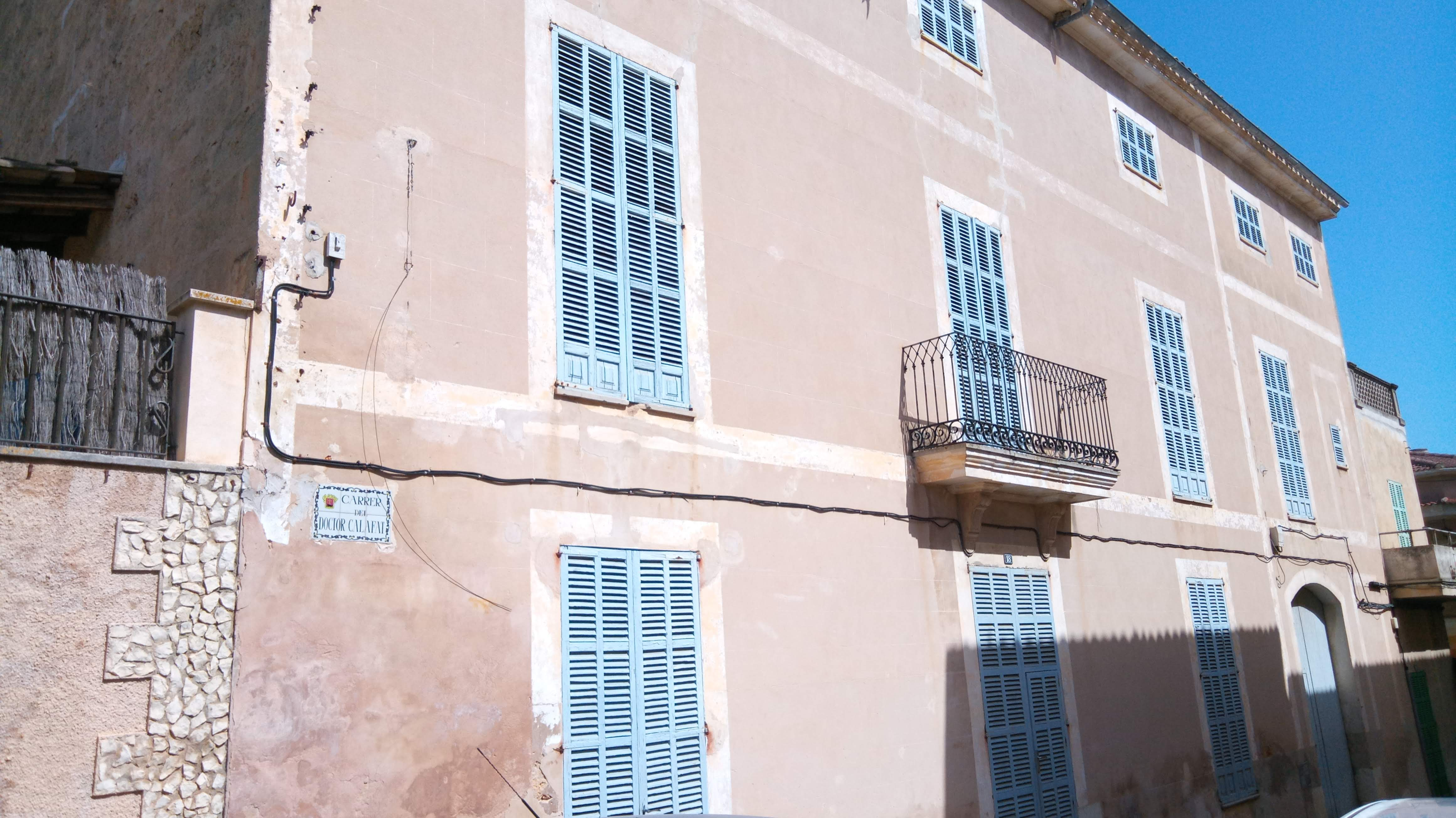
March's home in Santa Margalida, gifted to him after marrying Leonor Servera in 1916

Juan March married Leonor Servera (1887–1957). They had two children: Juan March Servera (Palma de Mallorca, 1906 – Madrid, 1973) and Bartolome March (Palma de Mallorca, 1917 – Paris, 1998).

The March family still is one of the richest families in Spain (after Amancio Ortega). They live between Madrid, Mallorca and Gstaad. The Casa March, an imposing villa overlooking Cala Ratjada, Mallorca and surrounded by an expansive sculpture garden, was built by Juan March in 1915; the gardens are open to guided tours.

== Barcelona Traction ==
March was widely known for involvement in lucrative illegal activities, bribery, political influence and bending the law whenever he saw a benefit. That was exemplified in his 1948 takeover of the Barcelona Traction, Light, and Power Company (BTLP) for a small fraction of its real worth.

BTLP was a utility company which provided power and streetcar services in Barcelona; originally incorporated in Canada, it was mostly owned by Belgian investors. BTLP had come through the Spanish Civil War largely undamaged, and was quite profitable. Its assets were about £10,000,000 (about $500 million in 2010). However, for the convenience of some of its foreign investors, BTLP had issued some bonds denominated in pounds, and the interest on the bonds was payable in pounds. The Spanish government had imposed currency restrictions. BTLP was unable to exchange its Spanish pesetas for pounds and so could not pay the interest.

That was not viewed with any great alarm by the bondholders since BTLP had plenty of pesetas and would pay the interest arrears whenever the currency restrictions were relaxed.

However, March sensed an opportunity. Agents secretly acting for him quietly bought up the bonds (about £500,000). Then, in February 1948, they appeared in a Spanish court, asserted that BTLP was in default on the bonds and demanded immediate relief. The judge agreed and awarded ownership of all of BTLP's assets to them (in fact to March). BTLP's foreign investors appealed but got no relief from Spanish courts. The Belgian government appealed to the International Court of Justice but to no avail, the final resolution coming in 1970, eight years after March's death.

There is an example of March's worldwide notoriety in John D. MacDonald's 1962 novel, The Girl, the Gold Watch & Everything. At one point, one of the chief villains of the story complains of the difficulties of operating in the United States, where the police are honest and the press interferes. He remarks:

It was always better elsewhere, particularly in Spain, where Juan March would help with the arrangements.

== Legacy ==
March is commemorated in the scientific name of a species of Spanish lizard, Algiroides marchi, which is a synonym of Algyroides hidalgoi. The Fundación Juan March is one of the most important foundations dedicated to the development of cultural and scientific enhancement in Spain.

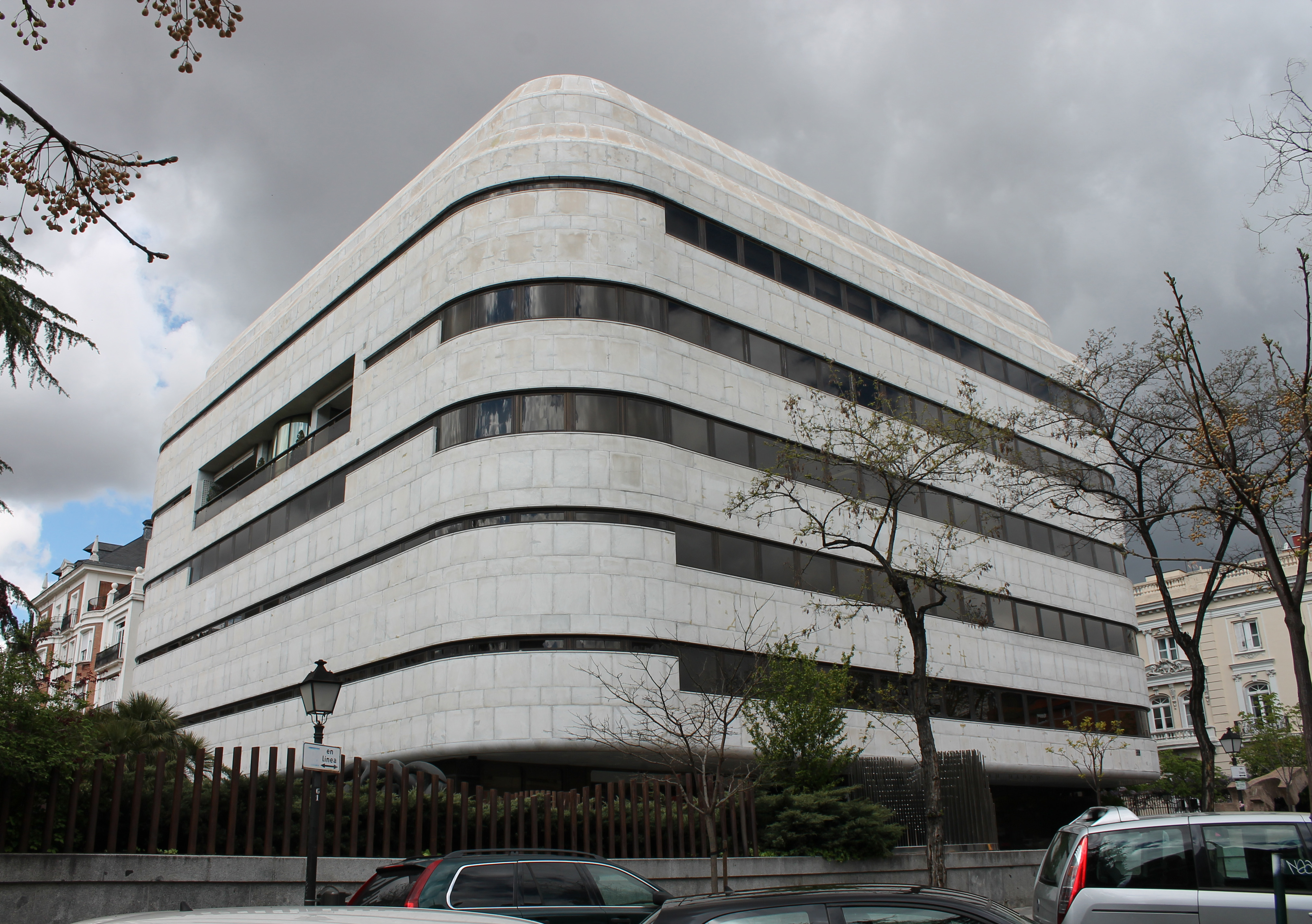
Building of the Juan March Foundation, Madrid

== Sources ==
- Garriga, Ramon (1976). Juan March y su tiempo [Juan March and His Time]. Barcelona: Editorial Planeta. (in Spanish).
