= Acerinox =

Stainless steel manufacturing group based in Spain

Acerinox, S.A.

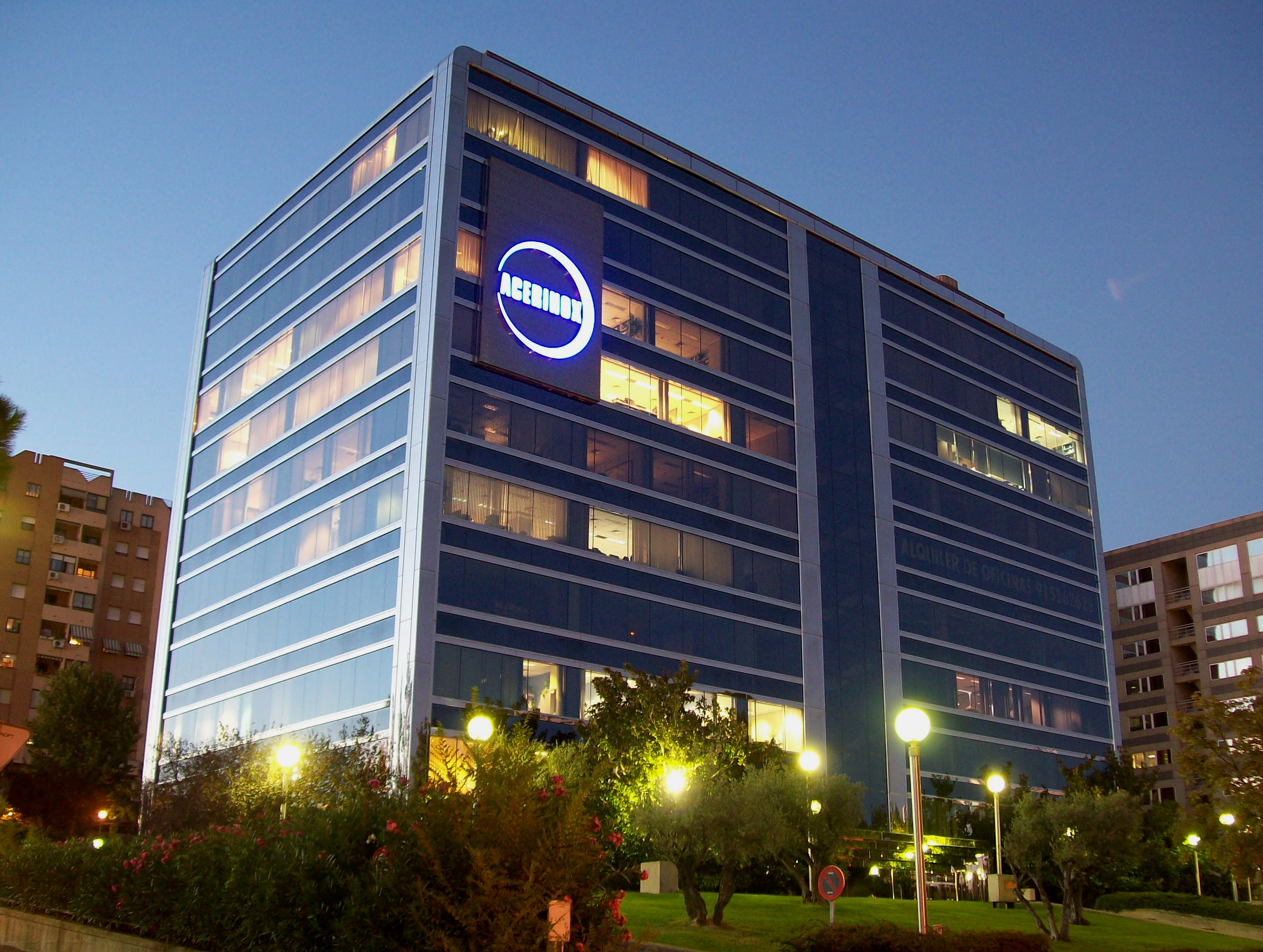
- Headquarters in Madrid, Spain
- Type: Sociedad Anónima
- Traded as: BMAD: ACX; IBEX 35 component
- ISIN: ES0132105018
- Industry: Steel
- Founded: 1970; 56 years ago
- Headquarters: Madrid, Spain
- Key people: Carlos Ortega Arias-Paz (Chairman); Bernardo Velázquez (CEO)
- Products: Stainless steel
- Revenue: ▼€5.413 billion (2024)
- Operating income: ▼€348 million (2024)
- Net income: ▼€224 million (2024)
- Total assets: ▲€6.469 billion (2024)
- Total equity: ▲€2.575 billion (2024)
- Owner: Corporación Financiera Alba (19.2%); Daniel Bravo Andreu (5.2%); South African Industrial Development Corporation (3.5%)
- Number of employees: ▼7,390 (2024)
- Subsidiaries: VDM Metals; Haynes International
- Website: www.acerinox.com

Acerinox, S.A. (Spanish pronunciation: [aθeɾiˈnoks]), headquartered in Madrid, is a manufacturer of steel and related products. In 2022, it was the 4th largest producer of stainless steel worldwide. It has operations in Europe, Asia, the U.S., and South Africa. It has fifteen factories including five in its stainless steel division. The company has been focused on increasing production in the U.S.

== History ==
The company was founded in 1970. It was financed in part by Nisshin Steel. In 2009, Nisshin increased its ownership in the company from 11.3% to 15.0%.

In March 2020, it acquired VDM Metals for €532 million. In November 2024, it acquired Haynes International for $798 million. It also sold its subsidiary Bahru Stainless for $95 million.

Acerinox is the only company whose executives have received the Stainless Steel Executive of the Year award twice: Victoriano Muñoz Cava in 2007 and Bernardo Velázquez in 2021.

== Accidents ==
In 1998, the Acerinox factory in Los Barrios, Cadiz melted a capsule of cesium-137 that was in a consignment of scrap metal. The radioactive substance was released into the atmosphere and spread over Europe — nuclear authorities in France, Germany, Italy, and Switzerland detected up to 2,400 microbecquerels of ionising radiation in the air, 1,000 times higher than the norm. Two other factories in Huelva and Badajoz also became contaminated by waste transported to them from Acerinox. During the clean-up, 7,000 metric tons of radioactive waste were dumped in Mendaña Marshes in Huelva. The estimated costs of the accident were 20 million US dollars for lost production in the factory, $3 million for clean-up, and $3 million for waste storage.

== See also ==
- List of steel producers
