= Verisure =

Security company based in Malmö, Sweden

Verisure P.L.C.
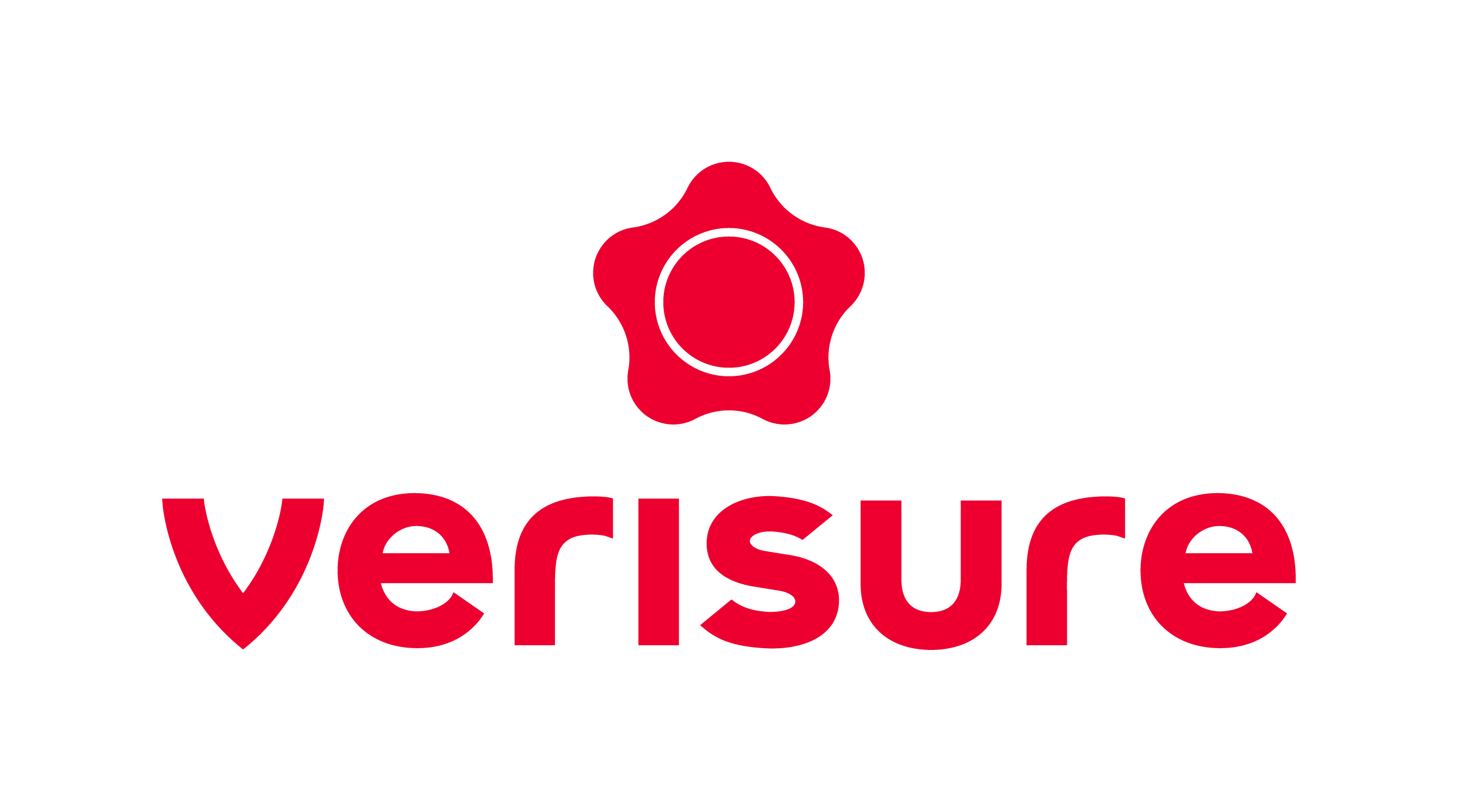
- Type: Public
- Traded as: Nasdaq Stockholm: VSURE
- ISIN: SE0001789306
- Industry: Security
- Founded: 1988; 38 years ago
- Founder: Dick Seger
- Headquarters: Versoix (canton of Geneva), Switzerland
- Area served: Europe and South America
- Products: Alarm services for business customers and consumers
- Number of employees: 30,547 (2025)
- Parent: Verisure PLC
- Website: verisure.com

Verisure P.L.C. (formerly known as Securitas Direct) is a security company based in Versoix, close to Geneva in Switzerland and active in 17 countries in Europe and South America and provides security services to 5.7 million families and businesses. Hellman & Friedman is currently the main shareholder in the group but announced plans to take the company public in October 2025.

The name Securitas Direct is used in two of the group's most prominent markets, Spain and Portugal, but may eventually change to the Verisure name. The Swedish unit addressing the business segment holds the name Securitas Direct and will not change to Verisure.

== History ==
Verisure was founded in 1988 in Sweden by Dick Seger, under the name Securitas Direct and within Securitas AB, which was founded in 1934. Then it turned into an independent company and during the 1990s the expanded into Europe and Latin America.

In 1993, the company established remote monitoring and response services manned by human operators. By 1996, it introduced a service tailored for small businesses, with exceptions for high-risk businesses like jewelry stores and banks. The company was acquired by the Securitas group, a global leader in security services, in 1997. Starting in 1999, GSM transmission technology was implemented, followed a year later by the development of an internal mobile application for the sales team.

Becoming Verisure in 2009, the new name of Securitas Direct's consumer branch, this corporate name has changed to Verisure in 2011.

It was listed at Nasdaq OMX Stockholm in 2006, when it was distributed to the shareholders of Securitas AB. In 2008, the company was bought by ESML Intressenter AB and delisted.

In 2011, EQT sold the company to Bain Capital and Hellman & Friedman for €2.3bn.

In a judgement from April 2015 the district court of Amsterdam, The Netherlands, ruled that the direct canvassing (doorstep selling directly to consumers), with alarm systems and associated multiyear PAC subscriptions, one of the primary commercial practices of Verisure (Securitas Direct), is unlawful towards consumers.

In the 2020s, the group is expanding, driven by a favorable market.

In September 2025, the group announced plans to go public and list on the Nasdaq Stockholm. The company said it was targeting a valuation of €12.9–13.9 billion, which would be the largest IPO in Europe since 2022. The company completed the offering the following month, raising €3.2bn at a €13.7bn valuation.

== Countries ==
The group operates in Belgium, Denmark, Finland, France, Germany, Italy, Netherlands, Norway, Portugal, Spain, Sweden, UK, Ireland, Argentina, Brazil, Chile and Peru. Recently open operations in Mexico after buying ADT alarm business company

=== Argentina ===
In 2022 the Argentinian subsidiary starts to market the anti-burglary fog. The company wants to invest 200 million dollars in the next decade to develop the business in the subsidiary.

=== Belgium ===
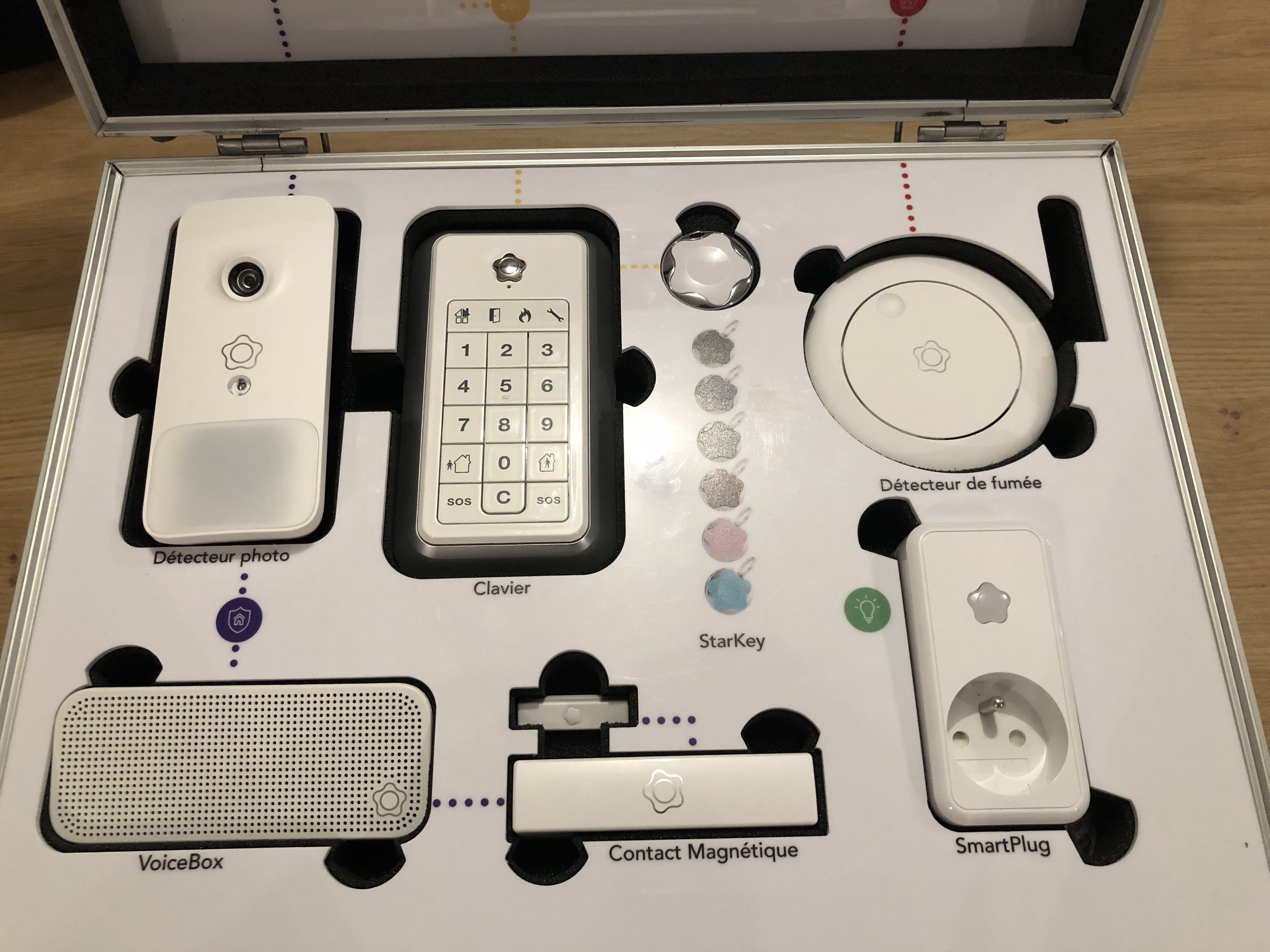
Material sold in Belgium at the end of the 2010s.

The creation of the Belgian subsidiary is the result of the takeover of Belgacom S.A. by Securitas Direct in 2001.

=== Brazil ===
The company has been expanding in Brazil since 2011. In 2020 it has 100,000 customers and 700 employees and has become the most present company in this sector in the country.

=== France ===
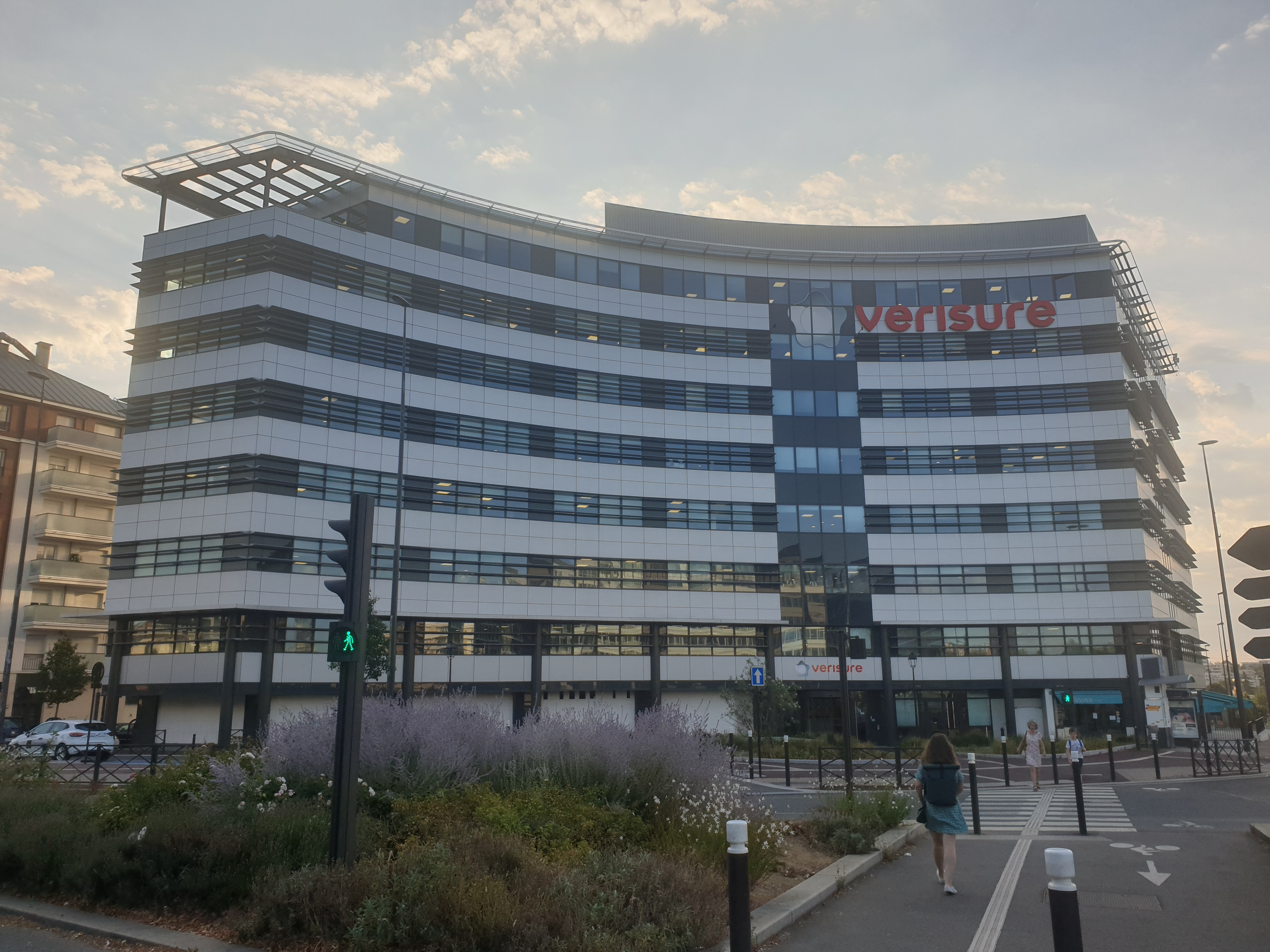
French Verisure headquarters at Antony in Paris metropolitan area.

The French subsidiary have 640,000 customers by 2022, making it the second largest in the group after the Spanish subsidiary.

Its head office is located in Antony, the company also has offices in Sainghin-en-Mélantois and Angers.

==== Brand name ====
The French subsidiary has had many names, from SDF Sécurité at its creation to SDF significant Sécurité de France. The possible confusion with the SDF acronym, meaning homeless people in French, led to a name change to Domen, then Domen Sécurité, Securitas Domen, then Securitas Direct and finally Verisure.

Securitas Direct should not be confused with the Securitas AB group, which is specialized in private security services for large companies and industries. The two companies were no longer linked after the IPO of Securitas Direct in 2006.

Before fully using the name Verisure, the French subsidiary temporarily used the name "Verisure by Securitas Direct" in 2011. Verisure is thus gradually becoming the official name of the company in the countries where it operates, with the transition being finalized in April 2020.

==== History in France ====
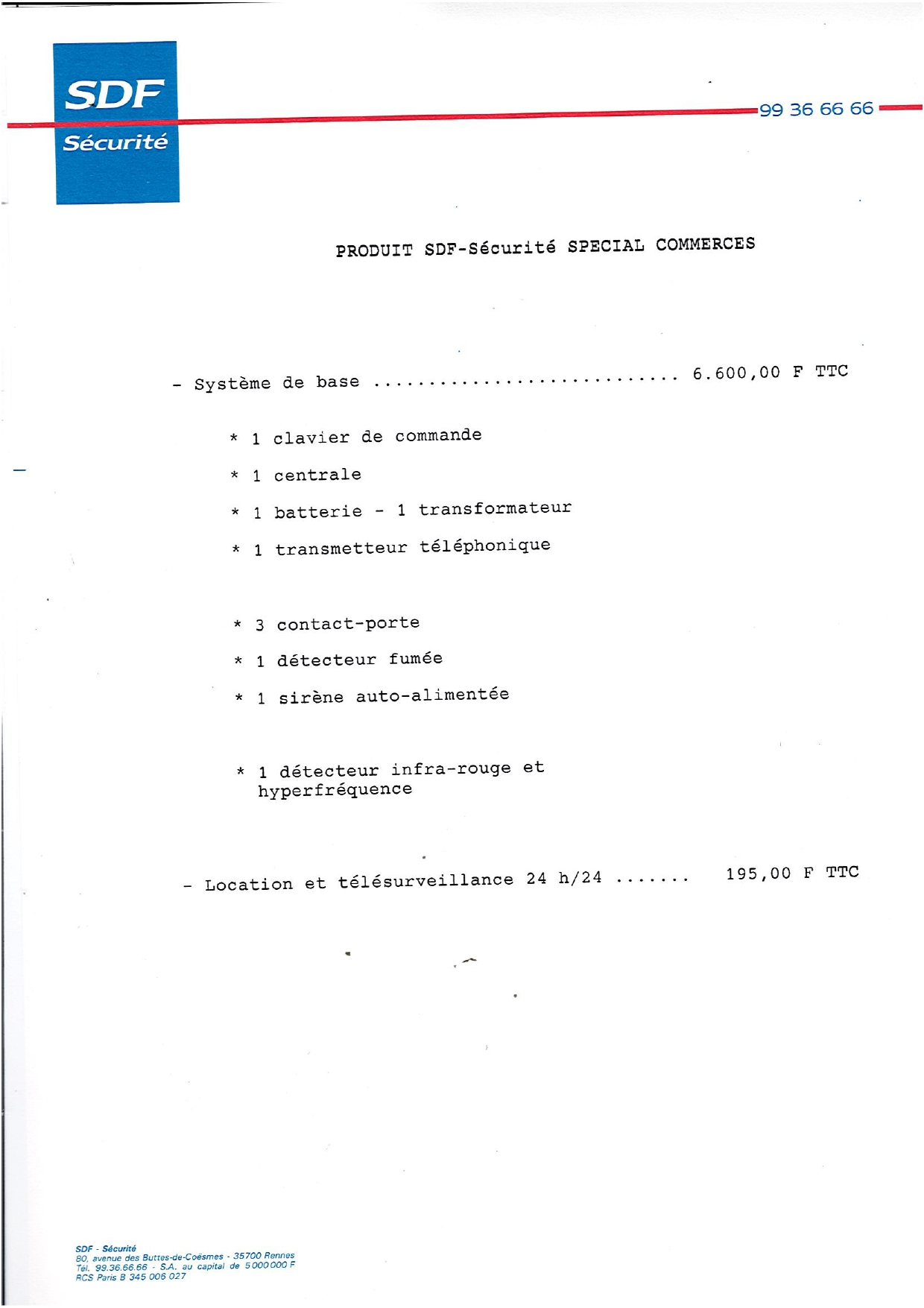
SDF Sécurité quotation for a business, in the late 80's or early 90's

- 1988: the company was created in May with marketing in June by the structure HD 2000, HD being the initials of "Habiter Demain", meaning living tomorrow in French, within the EDF-GDF group and at the initiative of the Caisse des dépôts et consignations. The Caisse des Dépôts et Consignations holds 52% of the shares and EDF holds 28%. The city chosen was Rennes, where HD 2000 was located, the director was Christian Arsac, and the company's initial name was SDF - Sécurité.
- 1997: joining the Securitas AB group, the company is then called Securitas Direct.
- 1998: use of Secom alarms allowing wireless communication.
- 2006: Securitas Direct is listed on the Stockholm Stock Exchange and becomes an independent company.
- 2013: Stéphane Plaza becomes the brand ambassador via the M6 Group.
- 2015: use of the Sigfox network for a link with alarms via an anti-jamming low frequency network. The company acquires its competitor Mediaveil recovering the patent of the opacifying fog.
- 2022: launch of a new system including 4G and an Arlo camera using artificial intelligence. One of the objectives is to solve certain problems encountered.

==== Partnership ====
A partnership was set up with Somfy, via the Tahoma box, in April 2016. Home automation functionalities can then be included in the offer, this partnership then ceased, as Somfy created its own remote surveillance. A partnership with Covéa was launched in 2017: it allows customers of both Verisure and MMA, MAAF or GMF to not pay a deductible in case of burglary. In 2022 the partnership was renewed.

==== Strikes ====
Several strikes have been reported in the press within the company: in 2015, 2016 and 2022.

In March 2015, a hundred employees were mobilized at the Châtenay site. The CGT is concerned about the relocation to the site in the North. The local CFDT denounces the lowest salaries in the sector with barely more than €1,500 and bonuses on objectives "unattainable, unless you work impossible hours!". The management indicates to review the remuneration which encourages the strikers to stop their movement, it also had to commit to pay the three days of strikes, not to start the mandatory annual negotiations with less than 2% increase in the wage bill and not to relocate. In December 2015, some of the remote surveillance operators went on strike in Sainghin-en-Mélantois. The employees denounced low wages in view of the working conditions: "We work seven days a week, including holidays, but we are not entitled to bonuses like the technicians." They also mention a constant pressure: "We are understaffed which leaves us no second of respite".

In March 2016 some of the staff, mainly agents in charge of remote monitoring, went on strike. The strikers denounced the low wages as well as the pressure from management to obtain more productivity. The mandatory annual negotiations demands were not met, with employees and management blaming each other. The employees concerned were partially successful in 2018 with the gradual introduction of a thirteenth month for non-managers and an attendance bonus.

In March 2022, a spontaneous strike was launched without the initiative of the trade unions, with demands for higher wages and better conditions. The movement was stopped 12 days later without the strikers having been able to win their case.

=== Germany ===
Verisure opened its German headquarters in Ratingen near Düsseldorf in November 2018. This is also the location of the emergency call and service control center (NSL) for German customers, which was certified in 2020 by VdS Schadenverhütung GmbH. The company has branches in Hesse, Rhineland-Palatinate, Berlin, Baden-Württemberg and, most recently, in Hamburg in 2021.

=== Italy ===
The Italian subsidiary started in Rome in 2013 in the Esposizione Universale Roma district. The subsidiary in turn launches the opacifying fog. During the summer of 2019, the national consumers' union denounces the brand's advertisements. Its president, Massimiliano Dona, points out that prices including VAT are not clearly indicated and that the subscription price is not always mentioned. The company responded by saying that in some cases VAT does not always apply and that a free estimate is offered before the actual purchase.

A partnership is set up with the Mambo community via the TikTok application.

=== Spain ===
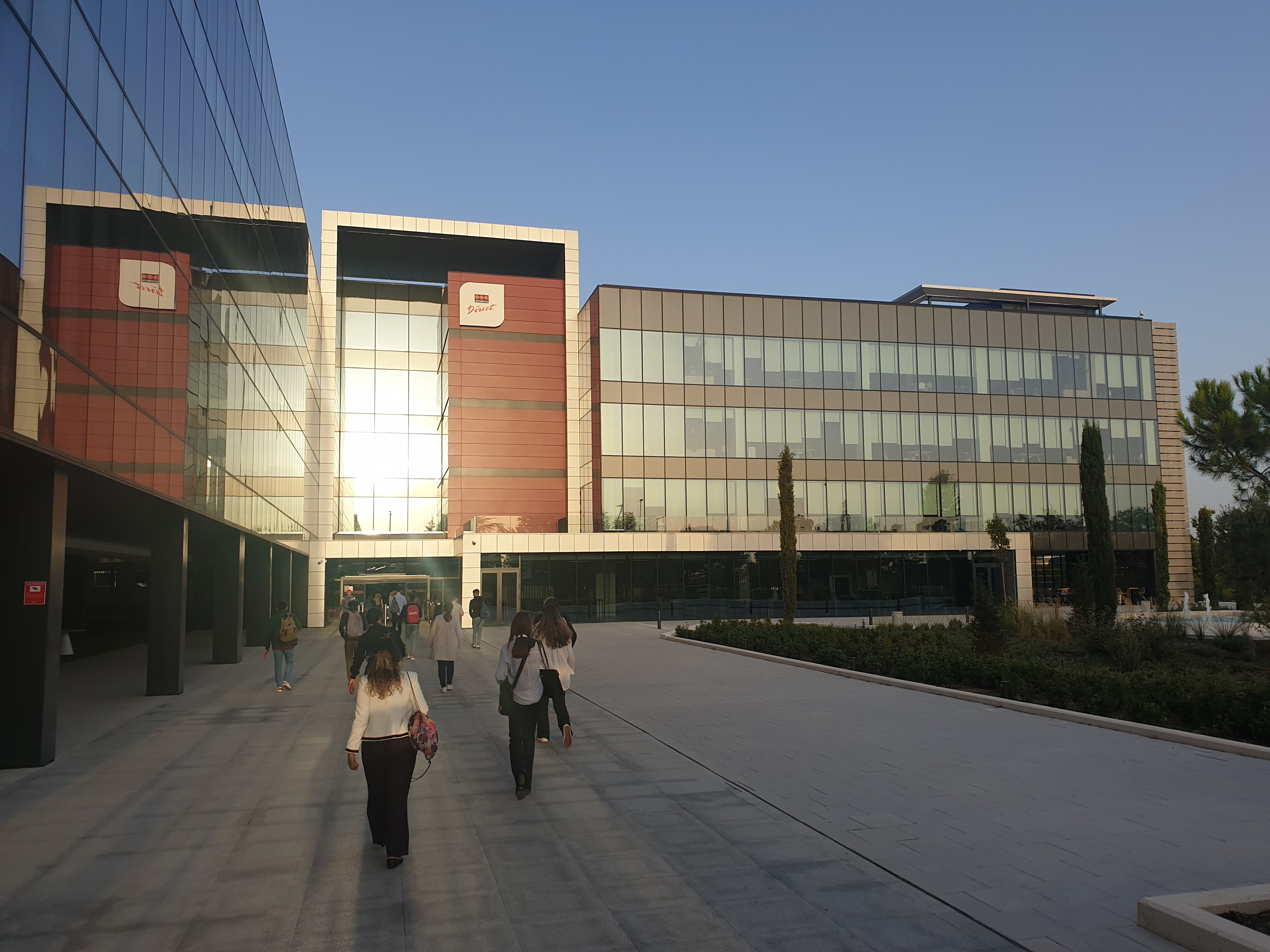
Verisure building at Pozuelo de Alarcón.

The Spanish subsidiary was created in 1989. About 2,500 salespeople worked for the company in 2018, this large number makes it tricky to control, in 2013 a salesperson, who was later punished, encouraged account managers to fake the existence of flights in order to get more customers. In 2019 it had 1.2 million clients and is the most developed of the group. In March 2020 Corporación Financiera Alba made a change in its portfolio, including an investment in Verisure of 7.5% or 557 million euros.

==== Critics ====
The Spanish subsidiary has been denounced by Facua and sanctioned for bad practices in its advertising, using fear of the elderly as a commercial strategy, for hiding unfair clauses in its contracts and for the lack of efficiency of its alarm systems.

Two fictitious articles were published on the satirical website El Mundo Today about Verisure: one stating that Netflix had launched a horror film based on the company's advertisements and the other about the fact that the company was burglarizing people who had not yet subscribed to its offer.

=== United Kingdom ===
The company launched in the United Kingdom in 2014, registering the subsidiary Verisure Services (UK) Limited at Companies House.

Verisure have a UK based Alarm Receiving Center, certificated to the European Standard EN50518:2019 by the Security Systems and Alarms Inspection Board (SSAIB) for receiving alarm signals.

In 2018, it was the first subsidiary of the group to market the opacifying fog system, ZeroVision. £5 million were invested to develop it. During 2021–2022, the company is moving to North Tyneside to the Quorum Business Park.

A partnership is set up with EE with two offers for EE customers: one for houses and another for apartments. The cost is charged in addition to the mobile subscription.

In 2022 Verisure UK passed 100,000 customers, making it the fastest growing alarm company in the UK.

In 2025, they were recognised as a Top Employer by the Top Employers Institute.

== Controversies ==
=== Price fixing in Norway ===
On Monday 17 June 2019 the Norwegian Competition Authority informs Verisure and Sector Alarm that they are liable for 784 million and 424 million of Norwegian krone respectively. The Authority finds that the companies cooperated not to sell residential alarms to each other's customers between 2011 and 2017 and shared Norwegian customers. This is the second largest fine ever imposed by the Norwegian Competition Authority, at only four million less than the landmark fine Telenor received in 2018 for violating competition rules. The amounts of these fines may not exceed 10% of the turnover of the companies concerned Glenn Øivind Støldal, Verisure Norway's head of press relations, says he is disappointed by the analysis made and that Verisure does not wish to comment on whether the company will pay. The director of the Competition Authority, Lars Sørgard, says that with a preliminary assessment the case is of great importance but that it is still too early to say whether customers should be compensated.

Also in spring 2019, electricity importer and mobile entrepreneur Nadir Nalbant strongly opposed the collaboration between Sector Alarm and Verisure. He set up the alarm company Homely in 2019 with prices 5 times lower than those charged by its competitors, which he describes as artificially high. He denounces the practices of Sector Alarm and Verisure, arguing that they have almost the same packages, the same prices and almost share the market between them, Nalbant told DN at the opening in March. He himself has been an alarm customer for nearly 20 years, and says he has never been contacted during that time by the competitor's salespeople. In his view, the amount of the fee speaks volumes about the price level in the market.

On 21 June 2019, Sector Alarm agreed to pay the Norwegian Competition Authority's NOK 425 million while stating that it had not collaborated with Verisure. Glenn Øivind Støldal commented that he did not know what could have motivated Sector Alarm to make such a decision. He still states that he believes that there was no illegal cooperation between the companies.

In July 2019, Øystein Foros, Professor of Economics at the Norwegian School of Economics, states that the agreement between the two companies is clearly a step towards reducing competition. He says that when Verisure and its business partners give incentives not to take each other's customers, it prevents competition in the alarm market. In November of the same year the deadline expired and Verisure refused to pay the fine. Lars Sørgard stated that market sharing is a very serious form of competitive crime, and the fees that have now been announced confirm this.

On 25 November 2020, the Competition Authority confirmed its decision by fining Verisure NOK 766 million and Sector Alarm NOK 467.3 million. The difference in the amounts is explained by the difference in sales between the two companies.

=== Misleading advertising and certifications in The Netherlands ===
Verisure Netherlands extensively advertises its security services on TV and the internet in the Netherlands. However, the Advertising Code Foundation (Stichting Reclame Code) has repeatedly notified them that their advertising methods could be perceived as misleading. For instance, implying a 40% discount is exclusive to a limited period, creating a sense of urgency, while a similar promotion often begins shortly after the discount ends, which is misleading. Verisure Netherlands falls short of the security standards set by insurance companies in the country, lacking a strong BORG certificate. Some of their employees acknowledge this fact, after an installation failed. Despite this, Verisure attempts to present a different image in their responses to customers which had a bad experience with the company. They highlight their Alarm Receiving Centre's (ARC) certification, but it doesn't meet the requirements of insurers for the security alarm installation itself in the Netherlands which ensures a correct working security alarm.

People also claim to experience door-to-door salespeople of Verisure after it was announced by their local government that they needed to build or create an Asylum Seeker Center. Verisure salespeople assert that their 'security is at stake.' This occurred in both Ter Apel, Gerkesklooster and Kaatsheuvel. The mayor of Gerkesklooster Oebele Brouwer made negative remarks about this and considered them 'troublemakers.'

=== Privacy scandal in Sweden ===
In 2022, a newspaper in Sweden published anonymous allegations that Verisure employees in Sweden were inappropriately accessing and sharing sensitive images and videos from security cameras. An internal investigation as well as the IMY (the Swedish Authority for Privacy Protection) did not find evidence to support the allegations.
