= Viscofan =

Spanish manufacturer of casings for meat products

- Company type: Sociedad Anónima
- Traded as: BMAD: VIS
- ISIN: ES0184262212
- Industry: Meat casing manufacturer
- Founded: 1975
- Headquarters: Cáseda, Spain
- Key people: José Domingo de Ampuero y Osma (Chairman); José Antonio Canales (CEO)
- Revenue: ▲€849.697 million (2019)
- Operating income: ▲€130.283 million (2019)
- Total assets: ▲€1.085 billion (2019)
- Total equity: ▲€784.366 million (2019)
- Number of employees: ▼4,628 (2019)
- Website: www.viscofan.com

Viscofan is a Spanish company that manufactures casings for meat products, with operations in multiple countries. It produces four types of artificial casings: cellulose, collagen, fibrous, and plastic. The company has been listed on the Madrid Stock Exchange General Index since December 1986 and was previously part of the IBEX 35 index.

== History ==
Viscofan was founded in 1975, which is also when it began producing and selling its products.

In 1988, Viscofan acquired the food group IAN (Industrias Alimentarias de Navarra), aiming to improve its presence in the Spanish market.

Viscofan continued its international expansion by acquiring the German company Naturin GmbH & Co. in 1990 and opening new commercial offices overseas. Additional acquisitions included Gamex in the Czech Republic (1995), Trificel in São Paulo, Brazil (1995), Koteksprodukt AD in Serbia (2005), and the assets of Sweden's AB Tripasin (2005). In 2006, Viscofan broadened its footprint in the Americas by acquiring the U.S. and Mexican assets of Teepak.

In 2008, Viscofan expanded its cogeneration plant in Spain. That same year, the company launched Viscofan Bioengineering, a business unit that merges bioscience and engineering to develop collagen-based products intended for tissue repair. The Bioengineering unit is located in Weinheim (Germany), where Viscofan also maintains a production site for collagen casings and an additional cleanroom facility for manufacturing medical-grade collagen materials.

In 2009, Viscofan established Viscofan Technology (Suzhou) Co. Ltd. in China. The following year, it opened a converting plant in the country. In 2012, the company created Viscofan Uruguay S.A., followed by the opening of a collagen extrusion plant in China in 2013 and another extrusion facility in Uruguay in 2014.

In 2015, Viscofan sold the IAN Group to focus on its casings business. That same year, it acquired Nanopack Technology & Packaging to expand its plastic product line and opened a new plastics plant in Mexico. In 2016, the company acquired Vector USA and Vector Europe.

== Production lines ==
Viscofan produces four types of artificial casing:

- Cellulose casings: This variety uses natural cellulose as its raw material. It is mainly used to produce traditionally cooked sausages. In most cases, the casings act as cooking molds and are generally peeled off by the manufacturer before sale to end consumers.
- Collagen casings: These casings use collagen as their raw material, a protein that is extracted from cattle and pig hides. This is an alternative to natural casings for the production of fresh and processed sausages. These casings are strong enough for quick stuffing, hanging and oven cooking. Viscofan holds around a third of the global market share of this variety.
- Fibrous casings: These are made with a mix of cellulose and Manila hemp, a plant-based paper that gives the casing high strength and a uniform caliber. It is mainly used for large-diameter and sliced meats such as mortadella or pepperoni. Viscofan is among the 3 top producers in the world of this technology.
- Plastic casings: This kind of casing uses different plastic polymers as its raw material, which are mainly used for cooked products such as ham, mortadella and cheese. Viscofan also has plastic products for packaging, such as shrink bags for fresh or frozen meats, and plastic films to separate sliced foods.

== International presence ==
Viscofan exports a large part of its products to other markets and is currently present in over 100 countries. It has production centers in 13 countries and maintains commercial offices in 15 countries.

== Bibliography ==
- Guillén, Mauro F.; García-Cana, Esteban (2010). Guillén, Mauro F.; García-Cana, Esteban (2010). The New Multinationals: Spanish Firms in a Global Context (in Spanish). Cambridge: Cambridge University Press. ISBN 9780521516143.
- VV.AA. (2012). Expansión (ed.). Las 40 empresas que crecen en tiempos de crisis (in Spanish). Bubok Publishing. ISBN 978-84-686-3028-1.
- Martínez Bernal, Pablo; Freischütz, Christian (2026). Los outsiders ibéricos. Ocho equipos directivos y el secreto de su éxito (in Spanish). Madrid: Marcial Pons. ISBN 9791399097016.
