= CIE Automotive =

Automotive industrial group

CIE AUTOMOTIVE S.A.
- Company type: Sociedad Anónima
- Traded as: BMAD: CIE; IBEX Medium Cap
- ISIN: ES0105630315
- Industry: Automotive
- Founded: 1996; 30 years ago as Corporacion Industrial Egana
- Founder: Javier Egana
- Headquarters: Bilbao, Spain
- Products: Components for Engine, Chassis and Steering, Transmission, Interior and Exterior Trim, Roof system
- Revenue: ▲€3.461 billion (2019)
- Operating income: ▲€594.359 million (2019)
- Net income: ▲€287.475 million (2019)
- Total assets: ▲€5.066 billion (2019)
- Number of employees: ▼23,000 (2019)
- Website: http://www.cieautomotive.com

CIE Automotive is a Spanish industrial group specialised in supplying components and subassemblies for the automotive industry. It is listed on the Madrid and Bilbao stock markets, and it has presence in 4 continents and 15 countries.

CIE Automotive focuses its activity on seven technologies — Aluminium, Forging, Stamping and Tube Welding, Machining, Plastic, Casting and Roof Systems.

== History ==
The origins of Corporación Industrial Egaña (CIE) date back to 1996, when INSSEC was created. It was an investment group whose most well-known figures included businessmen Juan Abelló and Abel Matutes, who would become Spain's Foreign Minister. The INSSEC project aimed to create a large Spanish business group in the automotive auxiliary sector, a traditionally highly fragmented sector. To launch the project, INSSEC reached an agreement in 1996 with Basque businessman Javier Egaña, owner of Egaña, SA, a small and medium-sized company with 100 employees based in Zaldívar, Biscay. Since 1961, it had been engaged in metal stamping for the manufacture of components for brake boosters (covers, chambers, and membranes), brake drum plates, and filters for the automotive sector, as well as the tools for their manufacture.

As a result of this agreement, Corporación Industrial Egaña was born, in which INSSEC was the majority shareholder, while the Egaña family held a minority but significant stake. Egaña was the first piece of INSSEC's industrial project. In the following years, Corporación Industrial Egaña grew at a dizzying pace and within five years had become a multinational group with more than 2,000 employees, 11 manufacturing plants, and a presence in five countries.

In 2018, Nugar Puebla (Mexico) was founded, a company that has automatic welding and assembly lines with robots. That same year Autometal Minas (Brazil) was acquired, which was founded as Zanini Industria de Autopeças, Ltda. Іn 1997 and is dedicated to the injection, chrome plating and painting of plastic parts for the automotive sector. Its products include emblems, wheel covers, front grilles, access systems for the fuel tank, spoilers and body moldings.

In December 2025, it was announced that CIE would acquire Aludec Group for €200 million, subject to customary closing conditions. The acquisition involved a decorative automotive components supplier operating ten manufacturing facilities across Europe and the Americas and employing approximately 1,300 people, and led to the creation of a new aesthetic components division within CIE Automotive.

== Shareholders ==
As of June 2020:

ACEK DESARROLLO Y GESTIÓN INDUSTRIAL, S.L.	14.909%
ANTONIO MARÍA PRADERA JÁUREGUI	10.000%
CORPORACIÓN FINANCIERA ALBA, S.A.	12.090%
ELIDOZA PROMOCIÓN DE EMPRESAS, S.L	10.345%
MAHINDRA & MAHINDRA, LTD	7.435%
ADDVALIA CAPITAL, S.A.	5.000%
ALANTRA ASSET MANAGEMENT, SGIIC, S.A. (Concerted share)	3.376%
TREASURY STOCK	3.128%
